= 2021 Bulgarian general election =

- Presidential election
- 14 November 2021 (first round); 21 November 2021 (second round)
- Turnout: 40.47% (first round) ▼15.81pp 34.85% (second round) ▼15.59pp
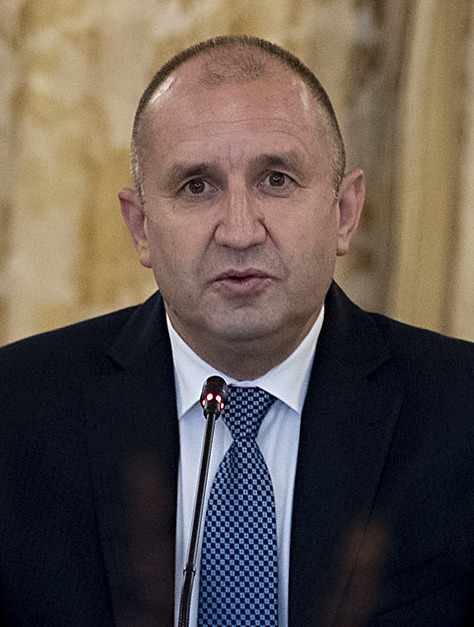

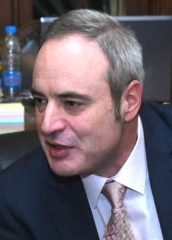
Nominee	Rumen Radev	Anastas Gerdzhikov
Party	Independent	Independent
Alliance	BSPzB; PP; ITN; IBG-NI	GERB–SDS
Running mate	Iliana Iotova	Nevyana Miteva
Popular vote	1,539,650	733,791
Percentage	66.72%	31.80%
President before election
Rumen Radev
Independent
Elected President
Rumen Radev
Independent
- Parliamentary election
- 14 November 2021
- All 240 seats in the 47th National Assembly; 121 seats needed for a majority
- Turnout: 40.04% (▼1.59pp)
Party	Leader	Vote %	Seats	+/–
PP	K. Petkov & A. Vasilev	25.67	67	New
GERB–SDS	Boyko Borisov	22.74	59	−4
DPS	Mustafa Karadayi	13.00	34	+5
BSPzB	Korneliya Ninova	10.21	26	−10
ITN	Slavi Trifonov	9.52	25	−40
DB	A. Atanasov & H. Ivanov	6.37	16	−18
Revival	Kostadin Kostadinov	4.86	13	+13
This lists parties that won seats. See the complete results below.

Prime Minister before	Prime Minister after
Stefan Yanev (caretaker); Independent (Second Yanev Government)	Kiril Petkov; PP (Petkov Government)

General elections were held in Bulgaria on 14 November 2021 to elect both the president and the National Assembly. They were the country's third parliamentary elections in 2021, with no party able to form a government after the elections in April and July. A second round of the presidential elections were held on 21 November 2021 as no candidate was able to receive a majority of the vote in the first round.

We Continue the Change won the most seats, although it was not a majority. Shortly after the election, they announced that coalition talks were going to be held. Incumbent president Rumen Radev gathered 66.72% of the vote, defeating university professor Anastas Gerdzhikov in a runoff.

Nationwide turnout in the parliamentary and first presidential round fell to 40%, Bulgaria's lowest participation rate in 30 years for both presidential and legislative elections. Nationwide turnout in the second presidential round experienced another drop, featuring only 35% of registered voters.

The leaders of PP, BSP, ITN and DB announced on 10 December that they had agreed to form a coalition that would end a months-long political crisis. President Radev shortly after announced that he had given the mandate to form a government to Petkov. On 12 December, Kiril Petkov presented the composition of the incoming government, and it was approved on 13 December by the National Assembly.

== Background ==
The previous parliamentary election which was held in July 2021, resulted in a narrow victory for the newly established There Is Such A People (ITN) over the ruling GERB party; however, ITN won only 65 out of 240 seats in the National Assembly of Bulgaria. Following the elections, ITN opted to try and form a minority government and started talks with potential partners (DB, IBG-NI, and BSP) in order to secure their support. Nevertheless, these attempts proved unsuccessful, and ITN announced on 10 August that they were withdrawing their proposed cabinet, making a third election more likely. Slavi Trifonov, the leader of ITN, said in a video statement that this meant new elections. The mandate to form a cabinet went to GERB.

GERB, the party of the previous prime minister Boyko Borisov, said earlier that it would not try to form a government. The BSP said that if the scenario repeats itself, it would suggest that the incumbent caretaker cabinet becomes permanent. IBG-NI also expressed confidence that it could come up with a solution if handed the mandate to form a government. Trifonov subsequently announced that he would not support any other parties proposing a cabinet. Parliament announced on 2 September that Bulgaria would hold the first round of the presidential election on 14 November, with a snap election likely to take place in the same month.

On 6 September 2021, BSP handed back the last mandate of forming a government, meaning the parliament would be dissolved and a third parliamentary election would officially take place in 2021. President Rumen Radev declared on 11 September that there would be two-in-one elections on 14 November for the first time in Bulgarian history, where voters would be able to vote on the president and the parliament. This decision was taken "to save treasury costs and voters' time".

== Electoral system ==
The 240 members of the National Assembly were elected by open list proportional representation from 31 multi-member constituencies ranging in size from 4 to 16 seats. The electoral threshold is 4% for parties, with seats allocated according to the largest remainder method.

The President of Bulgaria is elected using the two-round system, with voters also given a none of the above option.

== Parties and coalitions ==
=== Parliamentary parties ===
Party	Main ideology	Leader(s)	Current seats
ITN	Populism	Slavi Trifonov	65
GERB–SDS	Conservatism	Boyko Borisov	63
BSPzB	Social democracy	Korneliya Ninova	36
DB	Liberalism	Hristo Ivanov	34
DPS	Turkish minority interests	Mustafa Karadayi	29
IBG-NI	Populism	Maya Manolova	13

=== Parties admitted to the elections ===
When only some of the leaders of a coalition are its official representatives, their names are in bold. All lines with a light grey background indicate support for a party or coalition that has been agreed upon outside of the official CEC electoral registration.

Name			№	Main ideology	Leader(s)	July 2021 result	
Name			№	Main ideology	Leader(s)	Votes (%)	Seats
**RVO**	**VО**	Revival of the Fatherland	2	Left-wing nationalism	**Nikolay Malinov**	0.37% (LSChSR)	0 / 240
**RVO**	**NS**	New Force	2	Bulgarian nationalism	Atanas Sirakov	0.37% (LSChSR)	0 / 240
**RVO**	**NDLO**	National Movement for a Left Unification	2	Socialism	Boyan Durankev; Marian Dimitrov; Timur Glozhenski	0.37% (LSChSR)	0 / 240
**RVO**	**LA**	Left Alternative	2	Socialism	**Ivan Atanasov**	0.37% (LSChSR)	0 / 240
**Patriotic Front**	**NFSB**	National Front for the Salvation of Bulgaria	4	Bulgarian nationalism	**Valeri Simeonov**	3.10% (BP)	0 / 240
**Patriotic Front**	**BDSR**	Bulgarian Democratic Union "Radicals"	4	Conservatism	Tsvetan Manchev	3.10% (BP)	0 / 240
**Patriotic Front**	**BNDS**	Entire Bulgaria	4	Agrarianism	Georgi Valchev	3.10% (BP)	0 / 240
**Revival**		Revival	5	Ultranationalism	Kostadin Kostadinov	2.97%	0 / 240
**NOD**	**KOD**	Conservative Union of the Right	7	Conservatism	**Petar Moskov**	0.28%	0 / 240
**NOD**	**BZNS**	Bulgarian Agrarian National Union	7	Agrarianism	Nikolay Nenchev	0.28%	0 / 240
**NOD**	**BDF**	Bulgarian Democratic Forum	7	Bulgarian nationalism	Zhaklin Toleva	0.28%	0 / 240
**NOD**	**RzB**	Republicans for Bulgaria	7	Conservatism	Tsvetan Tsvetanov	0.31%	0 / 240
**BSDD**		Bulgarian Union for Direct Democracy	8	Direct democracy	Georgi Nedelchev	–	0 / 240
**BSDE**		Bulgarian Social Democratic Party – EuroLeft	10	Social democracy	Aleksandar Tomov	–	0 / 240
**Ataka**		Attack	11	Bulgarian nationalism	Volen Siderov	0.45%	0 / 240
**ONB**		Society for a New Bulgaria	13	Bulgarian nationalism	Kalin Krulev	–	0 / 240
**GN**		People's Voice	14	Populism	Svetoslav Vitkov	0.17%	0 / 240
**DPS**		Movement for Rights and Freedoms	17	Turkish minority interests	Mustafa Karadayi	10.57%	29 / 240
**Pravoto**		Rights, Reforms, Alternative, Opportunities, Responsibility, Tolerance and Unity	20	Populism	Maria Koleva	–	0 / 240
**VMRO–BND**		VMRO – Bulgarian National Movement	21	National conservatism	Krasimir Karakachanov	3.10% (BP)	0 / 240
**BNO**		Bulgarian National Unification	22	Bulgarian nationalism	**Georgi Georgiev-Goti**	–	0 / 240
**Volya**		Volya Movement	23	Right-wing populism	**Veselin Mareshki**	3.10% (BP)	0 / 240
**ITN**		There Is Such a People	24	Populism	Slavi Trifonov	23.78%	65 / 240
**We Continue** **the Change**	**PP**	We Continue the Change	25	Anti-corruption	**Kiril Petkov**	New	0 / 240
**We Continue** **the Change**	**Volt**	Volt Bulgaria	25	European federalism	Nastimir Ananiev	–	0 / 240
**We Continue** **the Change**	**SEC**	Middle European Class	25	Pro-Europeanism	Georgi Manev		0 / 240
**We Continue** **the Change**	**PDS**	Political Movement "Social Democrats"	25	Social democracy	Elena Noneva		0 / 240
**MIR**		Morality, Initiative and Patriotism	26	Conservatism	Simeon Slavchev	0.12%	0 / 240
**BOG**		Prosperity-Unity-Construction	27	Nationalism	Ivan Gaberov	–	0 / 240
**BNS–ND**		Bulgarian National Union – New Democracy	28	Anti-immigration	**Boris Ivanov**; Bogdan Yotsov	0.17%	0 / 240
**PD**		Direct Democracy	29	Direct democracy	Petar Klisarov	0.11%	0 / 240
**Democratic**; **Bulgaria**	**DB**	Yes, Bulgaria!	30	Liberalism	**Hristo Ivanov**	9.31%	27 / 240
**Democratic**; **Bulgaria**	**DSB**	Democrats for a Strong Bulgaria	30	Conservative liberalism	**Atanas Atanasov**	9.31%	27 / 240
**Democratic**; **Bulgaria**	**ZD**	Green Movement	30	Green politics	Borislav Sandov; Vladislav Panev	9.31%	27 / 240
**Democratic**; **Bulgaria**	**DEN**	Dignity of a United People	30	Liberalism	Naiden Zelenogorski	9.31%	27 / 240
**Stand Up.BG!** **We are coming!**	**D21**	Movement 21	31	Social democracy	Tatyana Doncheva	4.95%	13 / 240
**Stand Up.BG!** **We are coming!**	**DBG**	Bulgaria for Citizens Movement	31	Liberal conservatism	Dimitar Delchev	4.95%	13 / 240
**Stand Up.BG!** **We are coming!**	**ENP**	United People's Party	31	Liberalism	Valentina Vasileva-Filadelfevs	4.95%	13 / 240
**Stand Up.BG!** **We are coming!**	**ZNS**	Agrarian People's Union	31	Agrarianism	Rumen Yonchev	4.95%	13 / 240
**Stand Up.BG!** **We are coming!**	**IS.BG**	Stand Up.BG	31	Anti-corruption	**Maya Manolova**	4.95%	13 / 240
**Stand Up.BG!** **We are coming!**	**OT**	Poisonous Trio and Citizens	31	Direct democracy	Nikolay Hadjigenov	4.95%	13 / 240
**GERB – SDS**	**GERB**	GERB	32	Conservatism	**Boyko Borisov**	23.21%	63 / 240
**GERB – SDS**	**SDS**	Union of Democratic Forces	32	Conservatism	Rumen Hristov	23.21%	63 / 240
**GERB – SDS**	**DG**	George's Day Movement	32	Conservatism	Dragomir Stefanov	23.21%	63 / 240
**BSP for** **Bulgaria**	**BSP**	Bulgarian Socialist Party	33	Social democracy	**Korneliya Ninova**	14.78%	43 / 240
**BSP for** **Bulgaria**	**NZ**	New Dawn	33	Left-wing nationalism	Mincho Minchev	14.78%	43 / 240
**BSP for** **Bulgaria**	**CPB**	Communist Party of Bulgaria	33	Communism	Aleksandar Paunov	14.78%	43 / 240
**BSP for** **Bulgaria**	–	Ecoglasnost	33	Green politics	Emil Georgiev	14.78%	43 / 240
**BSP for** **Bulgaria**	**Trakiya**	Trakiya Political Club	33	Bulgarian nationalism	Stefan Nachev	14.78%	43 / 240
**BSP for** **Bulgaria**	**ABV**	Alternative for Bulgarian Revival	33	Social democracy	Rumen Petkov	14.78%	43 / 240
**BSP for** **Bulgaria**	**BL**	Bulgarian Left	33	Democratic socialism	Boyan Kirov	14.78%	43 / 240
**BSP for** **Bulgaria**	**BP**	Bulgarian Spring	33	Social democracy	Velizar Enchev	14.78%	43 / 240
**BSP for** **Bulgaria**	**DSH**	Movement for Social Humanism	33	Progressivism	Alexander Radoslavov	14.78%	43 / 240
**BSP for** **Bulgaria**	**DNK**	Movement of Independent Candidates	33	Left-wing populism	Boyko Mladenov; Boyko Nikiforov; Mincho Kuminev; Ognyan Boyukliev	14.78%	43 / 240
**BSP for** **Bulgaria**	**NS**	People's Force	33	Left-wing nationalism	Georgi Dimov	14.78%	43 / 240
**BSP for** **Bulgaria**	**ND**	Normal State	33	–	Georgi Kadiev	14.78%	43 / 240
**BSP for** **Bulgaria**	**OKZNI**	All-People's Committee for the Protection of National Interests	33	–	–	14.78%	43 / 240
**BSP for** **Bulgaria**	**SENKO**	Council of the European Scientific and Cultural Community	33	–	–	14.78%	43 / 240
**BSP for** **Bulgaria**	**SO**	Union for the Fatherland	33	–	Vasil Tochkov	14.78%	43 / 240
**BSP for** **Bulgaria**	**FPB**	Federation of Consumers in Bulgaria	33	Consumer interests	Emil Georgiev	14.78%	43 / 240
**BSP for** **Bulgaria**	**ND ZSCD**	For Social and Civic Development	33	–	Mladen Ivanov	14.78%	43 / 240
**BSP for** **Bulgaria**	**NSZ**	National Syndicate "Protection"	33	–	Krasimir Mitov	14.78%	43 / 240
**BSP for** **Bulgaria**	**OBT**	United Bloc of Labour	33	Social democracy	Ekaterina Atanasova	14.78%	43 / 240
**BPL**		Bulgarian Progressive Line	34	Democratic socialism	Krassimir Yankov	0.37% (LSChSR)	0 / 240
**Greens**		Green Party	35	Green politics	Vladimir Nikolov	0.12%	0 / 240
**Brigada**		Brigade	36	–	Arben Khavalyov	0.08%	0 / 240

== Presidential candidates ==
=== Candidates admitted to the elections ===
Name	Running mate	Parties or coalitions supporting the campaign	№	Sources
Yolo Denev; Politician and writer	Mario Filev	–	1	
Nikolay Malinov; Chairman of the party Russophiles for the Revival of the Fatherland	Svetlana Koseva	Russophiles for the Revival of the Fatherland	2	
Rosen Milenov; Former national security officer	Ivan Ivanov	–	3	
Valeri Simeonov; Chairman of the party National Front for the Salvation of Bulgaria	Tsvetan Mancev	NFSB, BNDS "Whole Bulgaria", Bulgarian Democratic Union "Radicals"	4	
Kostadin Kostadinov; Chairman of the party Revival	Elena Guncheva	Revival	5	
Rumen Radev; Incumbent President of Bulgaria	Iliana Iotova	ITN, BSPzB, PP, IBG-NI	6	
Goran Blagoev; Politician and journalist	Ivelina Georgieva	Conservative Association of the Right and Republicans for Bulgaria	7	
Blagoy Petrevski; Politician	Sevina Hadjiyska	Bulgarian Union for Direct Democracy	8	
Marina Malcheva; Politician	Savina Lukanova	–	9	
Aleksander Tomov; Chairman of the Bulgarian Social Democratic Party	Lachezar Avramov.	Bulgarian Social Democratic Party–Bulgarian Euro-Left	10	
Volen Siderov; Chairman of the party Attack	Magdalena Tasheva	Attack	11	
Boyan Rasate; Chairman of the party Bulgarian National Union – New Democracy	Elena Vatashka	BNU-ND	12	
Zhelyo Zhelev; Politician	Kalin Krulev	Society for a New Bulgaria	13	
Anastas Gerdzhikov; Rector of Sofia University	Nevyana Miteva	GERB–SDS	14	
Svetoslav Vitkov; Chairman of the party People's Voice	Veselin Belokonski	People's Voice	15	
Luna Yordanova; Singer and television personality	Iglena Ilieva	–	16	
Mustafa Karadaya; Chairman of the Movement for Rights and Freedoms	Iskra Mihaylova	DPS	17	
Tsveta Kirilova; Journalist and television presenter	Georgi Tutanov	–	18	
Lozan Panov; Chairman of the Supreme Court of Cassation of Bulgaria	Maria Kasimova	Justice for All Initiative and DB	19	
Maria Koleva; Director and writer	Gancho Popov	Law Party	20	
Milen Mihov; Vice chairman of the party VMRO – Bulgarian National Movement	Mariya Tsvetkova.	VMRO	21	
Georgi Georgiev; Politician	Stoyan Tsvetkov	BNO	22	
Veselin Mareshki; Chairman of the party Volya Movement	Polina Tsankova	Volya Movement	23	

== Campaign ==
The campaign started after the election was officially announced for 14 November. The pandemic remained a large issue, especially with the rise of the Delta variant in the country. The anti-corruption parties (ITN, DB, and IBG-NI) were all looking to hold their ground, while the established parties (GERB, DPS, and BSP) wanted to capitalise on public frustrations with the inability to form a government. The elections were widely hoped to bring an end to the political stalemate that had lasted since the April 2021 elections, after which no government could be formed. This time, there was more pressure on the anti-establishment parties to start negotiating a coalition government after the elections.

After the president announced the new caretaker cabinet, the economy and finance ministers who were replaced in the reshuffle, Kiril Petkov and Assen Vassilev, announced that they would compete in the November election as part of a new coalition named We Continue the Change, with the aim of becoming a new anti-corruption force that could form an effective government.

The global energy crisis was a large issue in the campaign, with natural gas prices soaring to record highs. Campaigning parties offered varying solutions to address this, with some supporting more reliance on Russia for energy, while others proposed domestic nuclear power in the longer term. The campaign was also influenced by the high levels of inflation in the country, which hit record levels at 4.8% in September, causing public dissatisfaction.

Another important issue was COVID-19 vaccinations. Due to a low vaccine take-up and high rises in the number of cases, the caretaker government implemented a "green pass", also known as the vaccine passport. The green pass required citizens to provide proof of their vaccination status in several locations such as hospitals, schools and restaurants. The measure was met with widespread protests.

On 6 October, the instructions of the Minister of Health and the Chief State Health Inspector for voting were approved, and did not differ from those for the elections on 11 July. Deputy Chairman of the Central Election Commission, Rositsa Mateva, said "there is no requirement for a green certificate for voting in the parliamentary and presidential elections on 14 November."

Bulgaria's Central Election Commission accepted the registration of 23 candidates for the presidential elections, announced after the deadline for applications on 12 October. This was the largest number of candidates in a presidential election in Bulgaria since the country began direct democratic elections for its head of state; previously, the highest number was 21, which occurred in 1992 and 2016.

The Organization for Security and Co-operation in Europe (OSCE) announced in a statement that it would send an observation team to the general elections, following an invitation from the authorities of Bulgaria. It noted that the Office for Democratic Institutions and Human Rights (ODIHR) had previously observed 12 elections in the country, most recently the 11 July 2021 early parliamentary elections.

== Opinion polls ==
=== Presidential election ===
==== First round ====
The opinion poll results below were recalculated from the original data and exclude polls that chose "I will not vote" or "I am uncertain" options.

Polling firm	Fieldwork date	Sample	Turnout range (Note: Minimum and maximum values.)	Certain undecided turnout													
Polling firm	Fieldwork date	Sample	Turnout range	Certain undecided turnout											Others	None of the above	Lead
Polling firm	Fieldwork date	Sample	Turnout range	Certain undecided turnout	Radev Ind. (Note: Supported by BSP for Bulgaria, ITN, PP, Stand Up.BG, Volt Bulgaria, ABV, Movement 21, SSD, OBT and PDS)	Gerdzhikov Ind. (Note: Supported by GERB, SDS, BZNS and DG)	Karadayi DPS	Panov Ind. (Note: Supported by Democratic Bulgaria)	Kostadinov Revival	Simeonov PF	Siderov Attack	Mihov VMRO	Mareshki Volya	Yordanova Ind.	Others	None of the above	Lead
2021 election	14 November 2021	—	—	—	49.4%	22.8%	11.5%	3.7%	3.9%	0.3%	0.6%	0.5%	0.4%	0.8%	4.4%	2.3%	26.6%
Alpha Research	Exit-Poll	—	—	—	50.1%	23.8%	9.6%	3.5%	4.1%	0.4%	0.8%	0.5%	0.5%	0.8%	2.2%	2.0%	26.3%
Gallup	Exit-Poll	—	—	—	50.0%	24.0%	9.1%	3.5%	4.1%	—	0.6%	0.6%	0.4%	0.9%	4.5%	2.4%	26.0%
Alpha Research	7−9 Nov 2021	1017	[47%-73%]	—	46.4%	28.3%	8.8%	6.9%	3.2%	—	—	—	—	—	6.4%	—	18.1%
Exacta	6−9 Nov 2021	1025	[47%-48%]	[8%-9%]	48.0%	27.9%	9.0%	6.8%	2.4%	—	—	2.3%	—	—	3.2%	0.4%	20.1%
Barometar	4−9 Nov 2021	839	[50.5%–63.4%]	—	44.6%	27.3%	11.4%	6.4%	2.1%	—	—	3.1%	—	—	5.2%	—	17.3%
Gallup	1−9 Nov 2021	1006	~48%	—	48.6%	25.3%	9.1%	5.2%	3.0%	—	—	1.5%	—	1.1%	4.1%	2.1%	23.3%
Centre for Analysis and Marketing	4−8 Nov 2021	1016	[66.9%-80.9%]	14.6%	48.2%	22.8%	9.1%	7.3%	2.0%	—	—	—	—	1.1%	9.5%	—	25.4%
Mediana	4–8 Nov 2021	957	—	—	48.3%	25.6%	10.3%	8.1%	3.2%	—	—	—	—	1.4%	3.1%	—	22.7%
Trend	1–7 Nov 2021	1013	43%	—	46.8%	24.4%	9.9%	6.4%	3.1%	—	—	1.6%	—	1.0%	6.8%	—	22.4%
Market Links	2−7 Nov 2021	1112	[58%–90%]	2.8%	46.7%	25.6%	10.3%	7.7%	2.6%	—	—	—	—	1.3%	0.9%	4.9%	21.1%
Exacta	29 Oct−5 Nov 2021	1025	[66%-67%]	[8%-9%]	48.0%	27.1%	7.5%	7.0%	2.2%	—	0.7%	1.5%	—	—	4.1%	1.9%	20.9%
Sova Harris	27 Oct−2 Nov 2021	1000	[52.4%–85.8%]	—	56.2%	23.5%	7.1%	6.8%	—	—	—	—	—	—	6.4%	—	32.7%
Gallup	23−31 Oct 2021	1081	[57.1%–77.1%]	—	47.6%	25.1%	8.5%	5.7%	3.3%	—	—	1.4%	—	1.1%	4.8%	2.5%	22.5%
Estat	23−31 Oct 2021	993	[54.7%-84.5%]	—	49.7%	27.3%	5.4%	8.3%	3.2%	0.4%	1.0%	1.4%	0.5%	0.8%	2%	—	22.4%
Centre for Analysis and Marketing	22−26 Oct 2021	815	[70.6%-83.1%]	17.4%	47.5%	21.8%	8.6%	6.2%	1.7%	—	—	—	—	0.8%	4.6%	0.5%	26.7%
Barometar	13−18 Oct 2021	858	[54%-65.5%]	—	44.8%	27.3%	11.2%	6.8%	1.9%	—	—	3.0%	—	—	4.9%	—	17.5%
Gallup	10−17 Oct 2021	1009	56.4%	—	51.2%	22.5%	7.9%	6.2%	3.1%	—	—	1.6%	1.1%	—	3.7%	2.7%	28.7%
Sova Harris	5−12 Oct 2021	1010	[55.2%–87.1%]	—	60.4%	24.8%	6.1%	5.3%	—	—	—	—	—	—	3.4%	—	35.6%
Centre for Analysis and Marketing	6−10 Oct 2021	812	<50%	—	49.5%	22.3%	9.1%	7.5%	1.7%	—	—	0.7%	—	1%	4.9%	—	27.3%
Alpha Research	4−10 Oct 2021	1123	52.7%	11.3%	42.6%	28.1%	8.7%	8.2%	3.9%	1.8%	1.6%	—	—	—	3.9%	—	14.5%
2016 election	6 November 2016	—	56.3%	—	25.4%	22.0%	6.6%	—	—	—	—	—	11.2%	—	57.8%	5.6%	3.4%

==== Second round ====
Polling firm	Fieldwork date	Sample			
Polling firm	Fieldwork date	Sample			Lead
Polling firm	Fieldwork date	Sample	Radev Ind.	Gerdzhikov Ind.	Lead
2021 election	21 November 2021	—	66.7%	31.8%	34.9%
Alpha Research	Exit-Poll	—	63.9%	33.1%	30.8%
Gallup	Exit-Poll	—	65.8%	31.4%	34.4%
First round	14 Nov 2021	—	49.4%	22.8%	26.6%
Mediana	4–8 Nov 2021	957	65.5%	35.5%	30%
Exacta	29 Oct−5 Nov 2021	1025	63.5%	36.5%	27%
Sova Harris	27 Oct−2 Nov 2021	1000	67%	33%	34%
Estat	23–31 Oct 2021	490	62.2%	37.8%	24.4%
Sova Harris	5–12 Oct 2021	1,010	70.6%	29.4%	41.2%
2016 election	13 November 2016	—	59.4%	36.2%	23.2%

=== Legislative election ===
Graphical representation of recalculated data

Local regression of polls conducted, excluding "none of the above"

The opinion poll results below were recalculated from the original data and exclude polls that chose "I will not vote" or "I am uncertain" options.

Polling firm	Fieldwork date	Sample	Turnout range (Note: Minimum and maximum values.)	Certain undecided turnout	ITN	GERB–SDS	BSP	DB	DPS	IBG-NI	VMRO	Revival	PP	Others	None of the above	Lead
2021 election	14 November 2021	—	—	—	9.5%	22.7%	10.2%	6.4%	13.0%	2.3%	1.1%	4.9%	25.7%	4.2%	1.4%	2.8%
Gallup	Exit-Poll	—	—	—	9.3%	23.1%	10.4%	6.4%	11.4%	3.0%	1.1%	5.0%	26.3%	3.6%		3.2%
Alpha Research	Exit-Poll	—	—	—	9.6%	23.2%	10.9%	6.5%	10.7%	2.6%	1.1%	4.8%	26.3%	1.8%		3.1%
Alpha Research	7−9 Nov 2021	1017	[47%-73%]	—	9.9%	24.1%	16%	10.2%	9.8%	3.6%	—	3.8%	16.5%	6.1%	—	7.6%
Barometar	4−9 Nov 2021	839	[43.3%–61.7%]	—	13.4%	26.4%	15.8%	8.1%	11.4%	2.9%	3.7%	1.5%	11.2%	5.5%	—	10.6%
Gallup	1−9 Nov 2021	1006	~48%	—	11.4%	23.5%	15.2%	9.6%	11.3%	3.4%	2.1%	3.5%	15.5%	4.5%	—	8%
Centre for Analysis and Marketing	4−8 Nov 2021	1016	[66.9%-86.1%]	13.5%	12.2%	23.5%	14.6%	11%	10.3%	4.2%	—	—	16.2%	8%	—	7.3%
Mediana	4–8 Nov 2021	957	–	—	12.2%	25.4%	15.6%	9.7%	10.6%	4.2%	–	3.1%	17.3%	1.9%	—	8.1%
Trend	1–7 Nov 2021	1013	45%	—	12.8%	22.9%	15.1%	9.1%	10.3%	3.3%	2.2%	3.6%	14.8%	5.9%	—	7.8%
Market Links	2−7 Nov 2021	1112	[58%–90%]	4.5%	9.7%	23%	12.1%	10.5%	11.2%	4.1%	1.2%	3%	16.3%	1.2%	8.9%	6.7%
Exacta	29 Oct−5 Nov 2021	1025	[65%-66%]	[8%-9%]	12.5%	23.8%	15%	9.2%	9.5%	3.5%	2.5%	3%	15.5%	3.7%	1.8%	8.3%
Sova Harris	27 Oct−2 Nov 2021	1000	[52.4%–85.8%]	—	13.4%	23.8%	16.7%	9.1%	9.7%	4.1%	2.1%	2.5%	15.6%	1.9%	1.1%	7.1%
Sociology Web Researcher	1 Oct−1 Nov 2021	43,987	48%	—	19.3%	22.1%	16.6%	8.5%	10.3%	2.9%	2.1%	3.3%	10.1%	4.8%	—	2.8%
Gallup	23−31 Oct 2021	1081	[58.2%–78.2%]	~15.6% odds: (PP +2.2%; DB +1.2%; ITN +0.5%; IBG +0.4%; DPS -0.4%; BSP -2.1%; G SDS -2.2%; other +6.8%)	11.3%	24.2%	15.7%	9.8%	11.1%	3.1%	2.3%	3.3%	13.7%	5.5%	—	6.1%- 8.5%
Estat	23−31 Oct 2021	993	[58%-84.2%]	—	15.2%	24.1%	18.1%	7.4%	9.2%	3.3%	2.3%	3.3%	14.3%	2.8%	—	6%
Centre for Analysis and Marketing	22−26 Oct 2021	815	[69.1%-82.1%]	16.4%	12.3%	22.3%	15.1%	11.8%	10.3%	3.2%	1.2%	2.5%	15.8%	3%	0.3%	6.5%
Barometar	13−18 Oct 2021	858	[42.2%–61.5%]	—	14.3%	26.2%	14.9%	8.8%	11.6%	2.9%	3.7%	1.5%	10.5%	5.5%	—	11.3%
Gallup	10−17 Oct 2021	1009	[54.2%–74.2%]	—	12.2%	22.5%	15.1%	11.2%	10.8%	3.7%	2.3%	2.9%	13.4%	5.9%	—	7.4%
Exacta	6−12 Oct 2021	1025	49%	12%	15.2%	23.5%	15%	10.2%	9.4%	2.6%	2.5%	1.9%	15.5%	4.2%	—	8%
Sova Harris	5−12 Oct 2021	1010	[55.2%–87.1%]	—	14.4%	24.2%	19.1%	9%	8.7%	4.2%	1.8%	1.9%	14.6%	0.4%	1.7%	5.1%
Centre for Analysis and Marketing	6−10 Oct 2021	812	—	—	11.7%	24.2%	15.8%	10.3%	11%	3.2%	0.7%	1.7%	12.8%	3.7%	0.7%	8.4%
Alpha Research	4−10 Oct 2021	1123	47.6%	10.6%	10.4%	23.1%	16.8%	10.9%	9.3%	3.2%	2.1%	2.9%	15.9%	5.4%	—	6.3%
Sociology Web Researcher	1 Sep−1 Oct 2021	86,376	56%	4.7%	22.9%	24.3%	14.1%	6.9%	7.1%	2.8%	1.8%	3.2%	7.8%	4.4%	—	1.4%
Gallup	21−26 Sep 2021	2000	[50.6%–73.2%]	—	12.3%	21.4%	13.4%	12.1%	11.4%	4.1%	2.2%	3.3%	15.2%	4.6%	—	6.2%
Market Links	14−20 Sep 2021	1076	[57%–90%]	5.4%	14.9%	25%	16%	13.1%	10.8%	3.6%	—	3.5%	11.9%	1.1%	—	9%
Barometar	12−16 Sep 2021	810	[35.4%–55.9%]	—	15.1%	25.6%	13.2%	9.2%	11.9%	3.2%	3.8%	3%	—	15%	—	10.5%
Trend	8–15 Sep 2021	1012	53%	—	17.5%	24.4%	16.6%	8.5%	9.3%	3.8%	2.2%	2.9%	9.1%	5.7%	—	6.9%
Alpha Research	8−15 Sep 2021	1017	51.7%	4.6%	18.6%	23.2%	18.1%	14.5%	10.5%	4.5%	—	3.8%	—	6.8%	—	4.6%
Gallup	2−10 Sep 2021	1007	[47.1%–70.9%]	—	15.5%	22.5%	16.1%	15.8%	11.9%	4.8%	2.4%	3.1%	—	7.9%	—	6.4%
Market Links	13−22 Aug 2021	1055	[52%–90%]	4.5%	17.2%	23.7%	17.2%	18.1%	12%	4.9%	—	4.7%	—	2.2%	—	5.6%
Trend	23–30 Jul 2021	1006	—	—	21.6%	22.4%	14.5%	14.1%	10.2%	4.4%	1.9%	2.9%	—	8%	—	0.8%
Market Links	21–28 Jul 2021	1059	[48%–88%]	4.1%	22.6%	19.8%	17.9%	17.2%	9.6%	5.4%	2.1% (Note: Result of Bulgarian Patriots)	3.7%	—	1.4%	—	2.8%
July 2021 election	11 July 2021	–	40.4%	—	23.8%	23.2%	13.2%	12.5%	10.6%	5%	3.1%	3%	—	4.4%	1.3%	0.6%

== Results ==
Polling stations opened at 08:00 and closed at 20:00. Kiril Petkov and Assen Vassilev were viewed as the winners of the legislative elections. Their party (We Continue the Change) received more than 25% of the vote. GERB remained second with more than 22%. DPS finished third place with over 13%, overtaking BSP, who finished fourth with around 10%. There Is Such a People, the winner of the previous election, was seen as the election loser, dropping to fifth with less than 10% of the vote. Democratic Bulgaria also dropped significantly in support, losing over 50% of their voters from the previous election and receiving only around 6% of the vote. Lastly, Revival managed to enter the parliament with around 5% of the votes, running on a campaign of Bulgarian nationalism and opposition to vaccine mandates. Stand Up BG! We're coming! lost all their seats in the parliament, receiving only 2%, whilst VMRO did not succeed in entering parliament.

We Continue the Change won the most votes in 14 districts of the country, including all three in the capital, Sofia. They also won in major cities such as Burgas, Varna and Plovdiv. GERB—SDS won in 12 districts, including Sofia-Oblast, Gabrovo, and Blagoevgrad. DPS was first in five districts in Kardzhali and Razgrad, as well as in Targovishte, Silistra, and Shumen. The results of the overseas vote differed from those in the country, as DPS received the most votes abroad with over 38% support. In second place abroad was We Continue the Change with over 22 percent. There Is Such a People, which was helped by the votes abroad, finished third, and GERB—SDS came fourth.

Incumbent president Radev received around 49% of the vote and was forced into a runoff against university professor Gerdzhikov on 21 November. Shortly after the second round of the presidential elections, President Radev was projected to win another term with nearly two-thirds of the vote, according to exit polls published by Alpha Research and Gallup International. Voter turnout stood at a record-low 33.7% and 3.0% of people who went to the polls did not support either of the two candidates, according to Alpha Research polling agency.

=== President ===
Candidate	Running mate	Party	First round		Second round	
Candidate	Running mate	Party	Votes	%	Votes	%
Rumen Radev	Iliana Iotova	Independent (BSP for Bulgaria, We Continue the Change, There Is Such a People, Stand Up.BG! We are coming!)	1,322,385	49.42	1,539,650	66.72
Anastas Gerdzhikov	Nevyana Miteva	Independent (GERB–SDS)	610,862	22.83	733,791	31.80
Mustafa Karadayi	Iskra Mihaylova	Movement for Rights and Freedoms	309,681	11.57		
Kostadin Kostadinov	Elena Guncheva	Revival	104,832	3.92		
Lozan Panov	Maria Kasimova	Independent (Democratic Bulgaria)	98,488	3.68		
Luna Yordanova	Iglena Ilieva	Independent	21,733	0.81		
Volen Siderov	Magdalena Tasheva	Attack	14,792	0.55		
Svetoslav Vitkov	Veselin Belokonski	People's Voice	13,972	0.52		
Milen Mihov	Mariya Tsvetkova	VMRO – Bulgarian National Movement	13,376	0.50		
Rosen Milenov	Ivan Ivanov	Independent	12,644	0.47		
Goran Blagoev	Ivelina Georgieva	Republicans for Bulgaria	12,323	0.46		
Veselin Mareshki	Polina Tsankova	Volya Movement	10,536	0.39		
Valeri Simeonov	Tsvetan Manchev	Patriotic Front	8,568	0.32		
Nikolay Malinov	Svetlana Koseva	Russophiles for the Revival of the Fatherland	8,213	0.31		
Tsveta Kirilova	Georgi Tutanov	Independent	7,706	0.29		
Aleksandar Tomov	Lachezar Avramov	Bulgarian Social Democracy – EuroLeft	7,235	0.27		
Boyan Rasate	Elena Vatashka	Bulgarian National Union – New Democracy	6,798	0.25		
Marina Malcheva	Savina Lukanova	Independent	6,315	0.24		
Zhelyo Zhelev	Kalin Krulev	Society for a New Bulgaria	6,154	0.23		
Blagoy Petrevski	Sevina Hadjiyska	Bulgarian Union for Direct Democracy	5,518	0.21		
Yolo Denev	Mario Filev	Independent	5,394	0.20		
Maria Koleva	Gancho Popov	Pravoto	4,666	0.17		
Georgi Georgiev-Goti	Stoyan Tsvetkov	Bulgarian National Unification	2,958	0.11		
None of the above			60,786	2.27	34,169	1.48
Total			2,675,935	100.00	2,307,610	100.00
Valid votes			2,675,935	99.65	2,307,610	99.83
Invalid/blank votes			9,487	0.35	3,909	0.17
Total votes			2,685,422	100.00	2,311,519	100.00
Registered voters/turnout			6,667,895	40.27	6,672,935	34.64
Source: Electoral Commission of Bulgaria (first round), Electoral Commission of Bulgaria (second round)

=== National Assembly ===
Party	Votes	%	Seats	+/–
We Continue the Change	673,170	25.32	67	New
GERB–SDS	596,456	22.44	59	–4
Movement for Rights and Freedoms	341,000	12.83	34	+5
BSP for Bulgaria	267,817	10.07	26	–10
There Is Such a People	249,743	9.39	25	–40
Democratic Bulgaria	166,968	6.28	16	–18
Revival	127,568	4.80	13	+13
Stand Up.BG! We are coming!	60,055	2.26	0	–13
VMRO – Bulgarian National Movement	28,322	1.07	0	0
Bulgarian Social Democratic Party–EuroLeft	13,710	0.52	0	0
Attack	12,153	0.46	0	0
Society for a New Bulgaria	11,627	0.44	0	New
People's Voice	11,546	0.43	0	0
National Union of the Right	11,239	0.42	0	0
Patriotic Front	8,584	0.32	0	0
Volya Movement	7,067	0.27	0	0
Russophiles for the Revival of the Fatherland	6,803	0.26	0	0
Pravoto	6,712	0.25	0	New
Bulgarian Union for Direct Democracy	5,894	0.22	0	New
Morality, Initiative and Patriotism	3,939	0.15	0	0
Green Party	2,968	0.11	0	0
Bulgarian National Unification	2,468	0.09	0	0
Prosperity-Unification-Building	1,723	0.06	0	New
Bulgarian Progressive Line	1,498	0.06	0	0
Direct Democracy	1,341	0.05	0	0
Brigade	1,151	0.04	0	0
Bulgarian National Union – New Democracy	1,099	0.04	0	0
Independents	182	0.01	0	0
None of the above	35,745	1.34	–	–
Total	2,658,548	100.00	240	0
Valid votes	2,658,548	99.58		
Invalid/blank votes	11,315	0.42		
Total votes	2,669,863	100.00		
Registered voters/turnout	6,667,895	40.04		
Source: Electoral Commission of Bulgaria

=== Voter Demographics ===
Gallup exit polling suggested the following demographic breakdown. The parties which got below 4% of the vote are included in 'Others':

Voter Demographics
Social group	% PP	% GERB–SDS	% DPS	% BSP	% ITN	% DB	% Revival	% Others	% Lead
Exit Poll Result	25	24	10	14	8	7	4	8	1
Final Result	25	22	13	10	9	6	5	9	3
Gender
Men	23	24	10	13	8	7	5	10	1
Women	26	23	9	14	7	7	4	10	3
Age
18–30	28	16	11	5	13	12	5	10	12
30-60	26	25	9	9	9	8	5	9	1
60+	21	24	10	29	3	4	3	6	5
Highest Level of Education
Lower Education	6	13	42	20	4	2	4	9	22
Secondary Education	21	25	10	16	9	5	4	10	4
Higher Education	32	24	3	11	8	10	4	8	8
Ethnic Group
Bulgarian	28	25	1	15	9	8	5	9	3
Turkish	5	10	73	3	1	1	2	5	63
Roma	6	13	38	16	4	1	4	18	22
Location
Towns and Villages	13	22	31	14	5	3	4	8	9
Smaller Cities	21	26	9	19	9	4	5	7	5
Larger Cities	32	22	2	13	9	7	5	10	10
Sofia	32	24	1	10	6	14	4	9	8

Voter Demographics
Social group	% Radev	% Gerdzhikov	% Karadayi	% Panov	% Kostadinov	% Yordanova	% Others	% Lead
Exit Poll Result	50	25	10	4	4	1	6	25
Final Result	49	23	12	4	4	1	7	26
Gender
Men	48	25	11	4	4	2	6	23
Women	50	25	8	4	4	1	8	25
Age
18–30	46	17	11	7	5	3	11	29
30-60	47	27	8	5	5	1	7	20
60+	57	25	9	1	3	0	5	32
Highest Level of Education
Lower Education	34	12	40	1	3	2	8	6
Secondary Education	49	24	10	3	4	1	9	25
Higher Education	53	27	3	8	4	1	4	26
Ethnic Group
Bulgarian	54	27	1	5	5	1	7	27
Turkish	9	14	69	1	1	1	5	53
Roma	32	11	34	1	4	5	13	2
Location
Towns and Villages	40	20	31	1	3	1	4	9
Smaller Cities	53	25	8	2	4	1	7	28
Larger Cities	54	26	2	4	5	1	8	10
Sofia	46	30	1	10	5	1	7	16
By Political Party
PP	80	9	0	4	1	1	5	71
GERB	10	83	1	1	1	1	3	73
DPS	3	6	90	0	0	1	1	84
BSP	93	1	0	0	2	0	4	91
ITN	78	9	0	3	2	1	7	69
DB	38	14	0	36	2	1	9	2
Revival	21	5	0	1	66	0	7	45
IBGNI	86	0	0	5	0	1	8	81
IMRO	25	26	1	4	7	3	34	1
Others/None	35	13	2	3	4	3	41	22

=== By constituency ===
Constituency	PP	GERB–SDS	DPS	BSPzB	ITN	DB	Revival	Others
Blagoevgrad	19.9%	26.9%	16.7%	9.8%	10.5%	4.4%	2.9%	8.9%
Burgas	26.2%	23.1%	14.3%	9.5%	9.0%	4.8%	5.2%	7.9%
Varna	29.1%	26.6%	4.6%	8.9%	10.7%	5.8%	6.7%	7.6%
Veliko Tarnovo	25.3%	21.2%	8.7%	15.4%	10.9%	4.8%	5.5%	8.2%
Vidin	20.6%	28.0%	6.3%	15.0%	11.7%	5.7%	3.4%	9.3%
Vratsa	22.7%	27.4%	8.6%	12.0%	11.0%	3.7%	3.9%	10.7%
Gabrovo	27.4%	29.9%	4.5%	10.4%	9.6%	3.9%	6.0%	8.3%
Dobrich	25.5%	20.2%	10.8%	14.5%	10.1%	4.2%	5.2%	9.5%
Kardzhali	7.0%	10.5%	68.1%	4.4%	3.9%	1.6%	1.1%	3.4%
Kyustendil	24.7%	31.7%	1.5%	13.4%	10.5%	3.4%	4.4%	10.4%
Lovech	22.4%	27.8%	8.1%	14.1%	10.6%	3.9%	4.6%	8.5%
Montana	23.0%	20.7%	18.5%	12.5%	10.5%	3.0%	3.7%	8.1%
Pazardzhik	21.4%	26.5%	13.1%	13.1%	9.9%	3.7%	4.1%	8.2%
Pernik	24.3%	32.9%	1.6%	12.2%	10.5%	4.4%	4.6%	9.5%
Pleven	23.7%	21.6%	6.0%	16.2%	14.9%	3.5%	4.2%	9.9%
Plovdiv-city	33.2%	25.4%	1.6%	9.3%	9.9%	7.4%	6.4%	6.8%
Plovdiv-province	22.6%	26.7%	8.0%	14.9%	10.3%	3.5%	5.0%	9.0%
Razgrad	10.7%	17.6%	44.4%	6.6%	5.7%	7.2%	2.3%	5.5%
Ruse	29.5%	21.3%	8.1%	11.1%	11.9%	4.2%	5.6%	8.3%
Silistra	17.2%	24.2%	28.2%	8.9%	7.8%	2.4%	2.8%	8.5%
Sliven	25.8%	26.7%	5.7%	12.0%	10.2%	4.1%	4.9%	10.6%
Smolyan	19.9%	24.8%	21.2%	12.4%	9.1%	3.7%	2.4%	6.5%
Sofia-city 23	36.6%	21.5%	0.5%	8.6%	5.9%	15.6%	4.6%	6.7%
Sofia-city 24	33.4%	24.0%	0.5%	8.4%	6.9%	14.6%	5.1%	7.1%
Sofia-city 25	32.1%	26.1%	0.6%	9.4%	8.3%	9.7%	5.8%	8.0%
Sofia-province	23.4%	28.7%	5.7%	13.3%	10.4%	4.3%	4.2%	10.0%
Stara Zagora	27.5%	23.0%	6.7%	12.7%	11.4%	4.2%	6.2%	8.3%
Targovishte	14.2%	16.9%	37.8%	10.9%	7.7%	2.8%	2.9%	6.8%
Haskovo	25.9%	22.5%	16.8%	10.3%	9.3%	3.6%	4.5%	7.1%
Shumen	20.0%	22.8%	24.7%	9.9%	8.7%	2.7%	3.8%	7.4%
Yambol	25.7%	24.0%	1.6%	19.8%	9.9%	4.1%	5.8%	9.1%
Bulgarian nationals abroad	22.4%	7.3%	39.2%	2.3%	11.0%	7.9%	6.2%	3.7%

== Aftermath ==
Following the DB coalition's poor results in the elections, Hristo Ivanov and the entire party leadership of Yes, Bulgaria! announced their resignations on 15 November. Korneliya Ninova, the leader of BSP, also resigned after her party's "catastrophic" result, winning only 26 seats and falling to fourth place. However, both were reaffirmed as party leaders by early February 2022.

Following the PP victory, Petkov told reporters after initial results were released that "Bulgaria is taking a new path. If we can stop [corruption] and redistribute money for the well-being of the taxpayers, then we should be able to come to an agreement with several parties." Petkov said he was willing to work with all parties that would join the fight against corruption in Bulgaria. He announced he was seeking to become prime minister and said he wanted to pursue "transparent" coalition negotiations with DB and There Is Such a People. DPS and GERB rejected coalition talks with PP. Analysts such as Boryana Dimitrova and Parvan Simeonov predicted that PP, ITN, DB, and BSP would form a coalition.

Shortly after exit polls projected that President Radev had won another term with nearly two-thirds of the vote, he commented in a statement that "an unprecedented political month of two types of elections ended, which clearly showed the will of the people to change and to break with corruption, robbery and lawlessness, to remove the mafia from power." PP co-leaders Kiril Petkov and Assen Vassilev congratulated Radev on his re-election victory: "We are ready to work with this president," Petkov said at a briefing after the end of election day. Vassilev commented that: "Next week we are beginning work on developing a clear and precise plan on how to make Bulgaria a much better place to live in the coming 4 years".

A series of talks on 18 policy areas were held between 23 November and 27 November, between the representatives of PP, BSP, ITN, and DB.

The leaders of four Bulgarian parties on 10 December said they had agreed to form a coalition that would end a months-long political crisis, making it the first regular government since April. The agreement followed lengthy talks between PP, DB, ITN and BSP. Kiril Petkov announced, "we are moving towards proposing a stable government, which we hope will continue for the next four years." Shortly later, President Radev announced that he had given the mandate to form a government to Petkov. On 12 December, Petkov presented the composition of the incoming government, and it was approved by the National Assembly on 13 December 2021.

== See also ==
- Corruption in Bulgaria
