= 2017 Bulgarian parliamentary election =

- 26 March 2017
- All 240 seats in the 44th National Assembly; 121 seats needed for a majority
- Turnout: 53.85% (▲2.8pp)
Party	Leader	Vote %	Seats	+/–
GERB	Boyko Borisov	32.65	95	+11
BSPzB	Korneliya Ninova	27.19	80	+41
OP	Krasimir Karakachanov	9.07	27	−3
DPS	Mustafa Karadayi	8.99	26	−12
Volya	Veselin Mareshki	4.15	12	New
This lists parties that won seats. See the complete results below.

Prime Minister before	Prime Minister after
Ognyan Gerdzhikov; NDSV (Gerdzhikov Government)	Boyko Borisov; GERB (Third Borisov Government)

Parliamentary elections were held in Bulgaria on 26 March 2017. They had originally been scheduled for 2018 at the end of the four-year term of the National Assembly. However, following the resignation of Prime Minister Boyko Borisov and the failure of Bulgarian parties to form a government, early elections were called. Borisov resigned following the defeat of Tsetska Tsacheva, the candidate of his GERB party, in the November 2016 presidential elections. The official election campaign began on 24 February. GERB won a plurality, with 95 of the 240 seats. Borisov was elected prime minister again after negotiating a governing coalition.

== Background ==
During the 2016 presidential election campaign, Borisov promised to resign if his party's candidate, Chairperson of the National Assembly Tsetska Tsacheva, lost the election. On 6 November 2016 Tsacheva finished second in the first round to BSP-backed Major General Rumen Radev, receiving only 22% of the popular vote compared to Radev's 25.4%. Following the result, Borisov reiterated his promise to resign if his party's candidate lost the runoff election a week later. On November 13, 2016, she finished a distant second with only 36.2% of the popular vote compared to Radev's 59.4%. Borisov, staying true to his campaign promise, subsequently resigned on 14 November. Two days later, the National Assembly voted 218–0 to accept it.

== Electoral system ==
The 240 members of the National Assembly are elected by closed list proportional representation from 31 multi-member constituencies ranging in size from 4 to 16 seats. The electoral threshold is 4%. Bulgarians abroad were able to vote in 371 voting sections in 70 foreign countries and territories. Some territories were excluded from this provision due to either security concerns (e.g. Afghanistan, Iraq, Libya and Syria) or that very few resident Bulgarian nationals resident in the country had submitted requests to be enabled to vote (e.g. Ethiopia, Indonesia, Mongolia, North Korea and Pakistan).

== Participating parties ==
The deadline for political parties to register for the election was 8 February 2017. Despite holding 15 seats in the Assembly, Reload Bulgaria chose not to compete in the election after being initially refused a name change, among other reasons. The list of registered parties is below.

Party or coalition		Leader	Ideology	European affiliation
GERB		Boyko Borisov	Conservatism, pro-Europeanism, populism	European People's Party
BSP for Bulgaria	Bulgarian Socialist Party	Korneliya Ninova	Socialism, Social democracy	Party of European Socialists
BSP for Bulgaria	Agrarian Union "Aleksandar Stamboliyski"	Spas Panchev	Agrarianism	
BSP for Bulgaria	Communist Party of Bulgaria	Aleksandar Paunov	Marxism–Leninism	
BSP for Bulgaria	New Dawn	Mincho Minchev	Left-wing nationalism	
BSP for Bulgaria	Ecoglasnost		Green politics, Environmentalism	
BSP for Bulgaria	Trakia			
DPS		Mustafa Karadaya	Liberal democracy, Bulgarian Turk's minority rights and interests	Alliance of Liberals and Democrats for Europe
United Patriots	National Front for the Salvation of Bulgaria	Valeri Simeonov	Bulgarian ultranationalism, national conservatism, Euroscepticism	Movement for a Europe of Liberties and Democracy
United Patriots	Attack	Volen Siderov	Bulgarian nationalism, Euroscepticism	Identity, Tradition, Sovereignty
United Patriots	IMRO – Bulgarian National Movement	Krasimir Karakachanov	Bulgarian ultranationalism, national conservatism	European Conservatives and Reformists
United Patriots	Average European Class	Georgi Manev	Economic liberalism, Pro-Europeanism, populism	
United Patriots	Union of the Patriotic Forces "Defense"	Nikolay Zahariev	Bulgarian nationalism	
Reformist Bloc	Bulgarian Agrarian National Union	Nikolay Nenchev	Agrarianism	
Reformist Bloc	Bulgarian New Democracy	Borislav Velikov	Liberalism	
Reformist Bloc	Bulgaria for Citizens Movement	Meglena Kuneva	Centrism	
Reformist Bloc	Union of Democratic Forces	Bozhidar Lukarski	Christian democracy, pro-Europeanism, conservatism	European People's Party
Reformist Bloc	People's Voice	Svetoslav Vitkov	Populism	
Reformist Bloc	Bulgarian Democratic Forum	Zhaklin Toleva	Nationalism	
Volya		Veselin Mareshki	Populism, Russophilia, Liberal democracy	
ABV – Movement 21	Alternative for Bulgarian Revival	Konstantin Prodanov	Social democracy, Russophilia	
ABV – Movement 21	Movement 21	Tatyana Doncheva	Social democracy	
Movement "Yes, Bulgaria"	Yes, Bulgaria!	Hristo Ivanov	Anti-Corruption	
Movement "Yes, Bulgaria"	The Greens	Zaritsa Georgieva, Vladislav Panev	Green politics, Environmentalism	European Green Party
Movement "Yes, Bulgaria"	DEOS	Viktor Lilov	Liberalism	
Coalition of dissatisfied	Bulgarian Social Democracy – EuroLeft	Dimitar Mitev	Social democracy	
Coalition of dissatisfied	Christian Social Union	Dimitar Mitev	Christian democracy	
Party of the Greens		Vladimir Nikolov	Green politics, Environmentalism	European Green Party
WHO – Bulgarian Left and Green Party	Bulgarian Left	Hristofor Dochev, Margarita Mileva, Ivan Genov	Democratic socialism	Party of the European Left
WHO – Bulgarian Left and Green Party	WHO – Competence, Responsibility and Truth			
WHO – Bulgarian Left and Green Party	Green Party of Bulgaria		Green politics, Environmentalism	European Green Party
New Republic	Democrats for a Strong Bulgaria	Radan Kanev	National liberalism, pro-Europeanism	European People's Party
New Republic	Union for Plovdiv			
New Republic	Bulgarian democratic community	Gospodin Tonev		
Bulgarian democratic center		Krasimira Kovachka, Stefan Kenov	Conservatism	
Movement for Radical Change "Bulgarian Spring"		Velizar Enchev	Left-wing nationalism	
Bulgarian National Unification		Georgi Georgiev	Bulgarian nationalism	
Revival		Kostadin Kostadinov	Bulgarian nationalism	
National Republican Party		Mladen Mladenov		
Movement for an Equal Public Model		Iliya Iliev	Rights and interests of Gypsies	
Movement Forward Bulgaria		Zornitsa Todorova		
Association DOST	Democrats for Responsibility, Solidarity and Tolerance (DOST)	Lyutvi Mestan	Turkish minority rights and interests, Good relations with Turkey	
Association DOST	People's Party "Freedom and Dignity"	Orhan Ismailov	Liberalism	
Association DOST	National Movement for Rights and Freedoms	Guner Tahir	Turkish minority rights and interests	

== Opinion polls ==
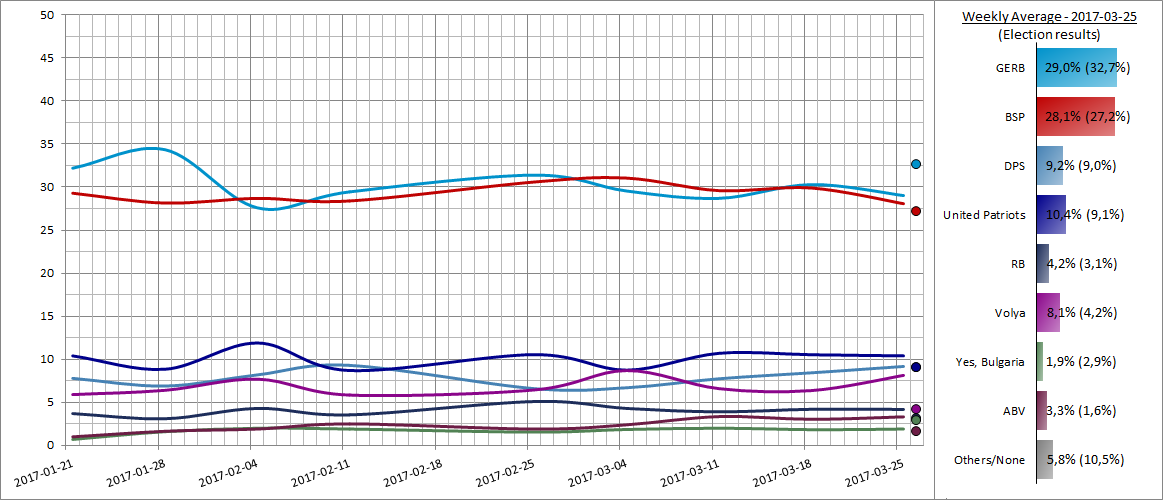

Percentages do not account for undecided voters. 'Date' column signifies the last date of the survey in question, not the date of publication.

Source	Date	Sample size	Margin of error	GERB	BSP	DPS	OP	RB	Volya	Yes!	ABV	Others / None	Lead
Trend	17 January 2017	1,002	± 3.1%	32.2%	29.3%	7.8%	10.4%	3.7%	5.9%	0.7%	1.0%	9.0%	2.9%
Alpha Research	22 January 2017	1,024	± 3.0%	32.6%	28.8%	7.8%	10.7%	3.8%	4.4%	2.3%	1.4%	8.2%	3.8%
Estat	22 January 2017	1,000	± 3.1%	36.1%	27.5%	6.0%	7.0%	2.4%	8.4%	0.9%	1.9%	9.8%	8.6%
Gallup	30 January 2017	816	± 3.5%	27.6%	28.7%	8.2%	11.9%	4.3%	7.7%	2.0%	1.9%	7.7%	1.1%
CAM	7 February 2017	1,012	± 3.1%	29.2%	28.1%	9.6%	7.5%	3.7%	5.2%	1.5%	0.9%	14.3%	1.1%
Trend	9 February 2017	1,002	± 3.1%	29.7%	28.7%	9.0%	9.9%	3.4%	6.5%	2.3%	2.0%	8.5%	1.0%
Sova Haris	20 February 2017	1,003	± 3.0%	31.3%	31.6%	6.4%	10.3%	6.3%	7.2%	0.5%	3.0%	3.4%	0.3%
Alpha Research	23 February 2017	1,024	± 3.0%	31.5%	29.6%	6.8%	10.8%	3.9%	5.7%	2.6%	2.9%	6.2%	1.9%
AFIS	27 February 2017	1,200	± 3.0%	28.2%	30.5%	6.7%	8.5%	4.5%	5.1%	1.3%	3.3%	12.0%	2.3%
Estat	28 February 2017	1,000	± 3.1%	29.5%	30.2%	6.4%	8.6%	3.9%	11.8%	2.3%	1.5%	5.8%	0.7%
Gallup	5 March 2017	1,003	± 3.1%	28.3%	30.2%	8.2%	11.9%	4.3%	7.4%	2.3%	2.6%	4.8%	1.9%
Institute of Modern Politics	6 March 2017	827	± 3.1%	29.1%	29.0%	7.3%	9.5%	3.5%	5.8%	1.7%	4.1%	10.0%	0.1%
Gallup	15 March 2017	1,012	± 3.0%	29.9%	30.3%	8.1%	11.5%	4.4%	6.5%	2.3%	2.4%	3.6%	0.4%
Estat	15 March 2017	1,000	± 3.1%	29.7%	27.2%	8.3%	8.6%	6.1%	10.5%	1.3%	2.6%	5.7%	2.5%
AFIS	16 March 2017	1,010	± 3.0%	31.2%	31.5%	8.5%	9.9%	4.4%	5.3%	1.1%	4.1%	4.1%	0.3%
Trend	16 March 2017	1,004	± 3.1%	29.8%	27.9%	8.7%	10.2%	3.8%	7.3%	2.1%	2.6%	7.6%	1.9%
CAM	16 March 2017	1,012	± 3.1%	29.6%	29.0%	10.8%	10.0%	3.5%	6.2%	1.9%	1.5%	7.5%	0.6%
Mediana	20 March 2017	1,010	± 3.0%	26.6%	27.7%	11.1%	10.2%	5.1%	9.6%	1.1%	4.0%	4.6%	1.1%
Institute of Modern Politics	20 March 2017	805	± 3.1%	28.5%	29.0%	9.1%	10.1%	4.0%	9.6%	2.0%	4.5%	3.2%	0.5%
Gallup	21 March 2017	1,012	± 3.0%	27.1%	26.5%	9.7%	12.3%	3.8%	8.2%	2.4%	2.6%	7.4%	0.6%
Alpha Research	22 March 2017	1,033	± 3.0%	31.7%	29.1%	8.4%	8.9%	4.0%	6.8%	2.5%	2.9%	5.7%	2.6%
Exacta	22 March 2017	1,000	± 3.0%	31.2%	28.1%	7.6%	10.5%	4.0%	6.5%	1.5%	2.6%	8.0%	3.1%

Combined result of the Patriotic Front and Attack.

== Results ==
Results of the election, showing vote strength by electoral district

Five parties crossed the 4% threshold required to gain seats. GERB maintained their position as the largest party.

Party	Votes	%	+/–	Seats	+/–
GERB	1,147,292	32.65	–0.0	95	+11
BSP for Bulgaria	955,490	27.19	+11.8	80	+41
United Patriots	318,513	9.07	+4.3	27	–3
Movement for Rights and Freedoms	315,976	8.99	–5.9	26	–12
Volya	145,637	4.15	New	12	New
Reformist Bloc	107,407	3.06	–5.8	0	–23
Yes, Bulgaria!	101,177	2.88	New	0	New
Association DOST	100,479	2.86	New	0	New
New Republic	86,984	2.48	New	0	New
Alternative for Bulgarian Revival–Movement 21	54,412	1.55	–2.6	0	–11
Revival	37,896	1.08	New	0	New
Party of the Greens	10,159	0.29	–0.3	0	0
Bulgarian Spring	9,232	0.26	New	0	New
Forward Bulgaria Movement	6,644	0.19	New	0	New
Coalition of the Dissatisfied	5,945	0.17	New	0	New
Movement for an Equal Public Model	4,989	0.14	New	0	New
Bulgarian National Unification	3,921	0.11	New	0	New
Bulgarian Democratic Center	3,130	0.09	New	0	New
WHO–BL–ZP	2,916	0.08		0	0
National Republican Party	2,325	0.07	New	0	New
Independents	5,116	0.15	–0.0	0	0
None of the above	87,850	2.50	–	–	–
Total	3,513,490	100.00	–	240	0
Valid votes	3,513,490	95.41			
Invalid/blank votes	169,009	4.59			
Total votes	3,682,499	100.00			
Registered voters/turnout	6,838,235	53.85			
Source: CIK

=== Voter demographics ===
Gallup exit polling suggested the following demographic breakdown.

Voter demographics
Social group	% GERB	% BSP	% OP	% DPS	% Volya	% RB	% Yes!	% DOST	% Others	% Lead
Exit poll result	33	28	10	9	4	3	3	3	7	5
Final result	32.7	27.2	9.1	9.0	4.2	3.1	2.9	2.8	8	5.5
Gender
Men	31	25	10	9	5	4	3	3	9	6
Women	33	30	8	8	4	3	4	2	8	3
Age
18–30	32	14	7	11	5	5	8	4	13	18
30-60	34	23	10	9	6	5	4	2	7	11
60+	26	44	9	6	3	1	1	2	8	18
Highest level of education
Lower education	21	28	6	26	2	2	0	9	6	2
Secondary education	34	26	10	8	5	4	2	2	9	8
Higher education	32	28	8	3	4	6	7	0	11	4
Ethnic group
Bulgarian	34	30	11	1	5	4	5	1	9	4
Turkish	14	8	0	53	2	0	1	19	3	34
Roma	28	21	2	23	1	7	0	9	9	5
Location
Towns and villages	28	26	8	21	3	2	0	10	10	2
Smaller cities	29	32	11	8	5	4	2	4	5	3
Larger cities	35	27	9	3	6	5	4	0	11	8
Sofia	33	23	7	1	3	8	12	0	13	10
Vote in the second round of the 2016 presidential election
Rumen Radev - 53,4%	9	48	11	10	4	3	2	2	11	37
Tsetska Tsacheva - 30,5%	75	2	4	3	4	4	2	2	4	71
No one/didn't vote - 16,1%	25	5	13	11	8	7	10	5	16	12

== Aftermath and government formation ==
Boyko Borisov appeared set to resume his tenure as prime minister, possibly with a coalition with the United Patriots, and ultimately formed the Third Borisov Government with the United Patriots.
