= Patriotic Front (Bulgaria, 2021) =

Patriotic Front Патриотичен фронт
- Abbreviation: PF
- Leader: Valeri Simeonov
- Founded: 29 September 2021
- Preceded by: Bulgarian Patriots
- Ideology: National conservatism; Social conservatism; Right-wing populism; Euroscepticism
- Political position: Right-wing to far-right
- Member parties: NFSB; BDSR; Entire Bulgaria
- Colours: Blue

The Patriotic Front (Bulgarian: Патриотичен фронт; PF) is a Bulgarian nationalist coalition participating in the November 2021 Bulgarian parliamentary election. The coalition includes NFSB, Entire Bulgaria and BDSR. At the same time, the coalition does not include VMRO and Volya, which was in several coalitions before this one: Patriotic Front (2014), United Patriots, and Bulgarian Patriots.

== Electoral history ==
=== Parliamentary ===
Bulgarian Parliament
Election	Votes	%	Rank	Seats	+/–	Government
Nov 2021	8,602	0.32%	15th	0 / 240	0	Extra-parliamentary

=== Presidential ===
Election	Candidate	First round		Second round		Result
Election	Candidate	Votes	%	Votes	%	Result
2021	Valeri Simeonov	8,568	0.32%			Lost

== See also ==
- Patriotic Front (2014-2017)
- United Patriots (2016-2021)
- Bulgarian Patriots (May–August 2021)
