= Bulgarian Patriots =

Bulgarian Patriots Българските патриоти
- Abbreviation: BP
- Leader: Krasimir Karakachanov; Veselin Mareshki; Valeri Simeonov
- Founded: 20 May 2021
- Dissolved: August 2021
- Preceded by: United Patriots; Patriotic Coalition Volya–NFSB
- Succeeded by: Patriotic Front (2021)
- Ideology: National conservatism; Social conservatism; Right-wing populism; Euroscepticism
- Political position: Right-wing to far-right
- Member parties: VMRO; Volya; NFSB; SPSZ; SBDR
- Colors: Blue
- National Assembly: 0 / 240

The Bulgarian Patriots (Bulgarian: Българските патриоти, romanized: Bŭlgarskite patrioti) was a nationalist electoral alliance formed by VMRO, Volya, and the National Front for the Salvation of Bulgaria.

The leaders of the three parties will not be MP candidates, as proposed by VRMO leader Krasimir Karakachanov, due to previous infighting that brought down earlier "patriotic" coalitions.

== Electoral history ==
Bulgarian Parliament
Election	Votes	%	Rank	Seats	+/–	Government
July 2021	85,795	3.10	8th	0 / 240		Extra-parliamentary
