= Tashev =

Tashev (Bulgarian: Ташев; feminine: Tasheva) is a Bulgarian surname. Notable people with the surname include:

- Galin Tashev (born 1997), Bulgarian footballer
- Magdalena Tasheva (born 1953), Bulgarian journalist and politician
