= Volya Movement =

Bulgarian political party

Volya Movement Движение Воля
- Leader: Veselin Mareshki
- Founded: 15 July 2007 (Liberal Alliance); 4 November 2012 (Today); 28 November 2016 (Volya)
- Split from: Order, Law and Justice
- Preceded by: National Movement for Freedom and Democracy
- Headquarters: Varna, Bulgaria
- Ideology: Bulgarian nationalism Right-wing populism Anti-corruption; Anti-establishment; Euroscepticism
- Political position: Right-wing
- National affiliation: Bulgarian Patriots
- European affiliation: Identity and Democracy Party (2018–2022)
- Colours: Teal and white Light blue (former)
- National Assembly: 0 / 240
- European Parliament: 0 / 17

Website
- Official website

Volya Movement (Bulgarian: Движение Воля, romanized: Dvizhenie Volya, lit. 'Will Movement') is a right-wing populist political party in Bulgaria. Before 2016, it was known variously as Today and Liberal Alliance. The party was established by Bulgarian businessman Veselin Mareshki, ostensibly on principles of anti-corruption and anti-elitism.

== History ==
Volya was originally founded by Veselin Mareshki on July 15, 2007, under the name Liberal Alliance. Following a brief stint as the Dnes party, the name was changed on November 28, 2016, to Volya.

In the 2017 Bulgarian parliamentary elections, Volya won 12 seats in the National Assembly. After negotiations, Volya agreed to support a coalition government between GERB and United Patriots.

In 2018, Volya joined the Movement for a Europe of Nations and Freedom, now referred to as the Identity and Democracy Party. The European political party organizes nationalist parties across Europe and includes the French National Rally, Italian League, and Freedom Party of Austria.

Volya took part in the 2019 European Parliament election in Bulgaria as a member of the Volya-The Bulgarian Patriots coalition. The coalition also included the Agrarian Union "Aleksandar Stamboliyski", the People's Party for Freedom and Dignity, and the United Social Democrats. Mareshki topped the coalition list and stated he would decide whether to keep his seat if elected. The coalition hoped to gain two seats but failed to gain any, finishing in 6th place.

Ahead of the second 2021 Bulgarian parliamentary election, Volya formed an electoral alliance with the National Front for the Salvation of Bulgaria. and the IMRO – Bulgarian National Movement.

== Political views ==
The Volya party advocates populist and reform policies, promoting patriotism, strict immigration controls, friendlier relations with Moscow, and the need to "sweep away the garbage" of a corrupt political establishment. Volya advocates for Bulgarian withdrawal from NATO, which it views as being economically draining on the Bulgarian people whilst providing no benefits to national security. Despite Veselin Mareshki's calls for a "strong united Europe," the party has been described as generally Eurosceptic.

== Election results ==
=== Statistics ===
Bulgarian National Assembly
Election	# of Seats Won	# of Total Votes	% of Popular Vote	Rank	Status
2009	0 / 240	-	-	-	Did not contest
2013	0 / 240	8,873	0.25%	19th	Extra-parliamentary
2014	0 / 240	-	-	-	Did not contest
2017	12 / 240	145,637	4.15%	5th	Supply and support
April 2021	0 / 240	75,921	2.33%	10th (Note: Results of the alliance Patriotic Coalition Volya–NFSB.)	Extra-parliamentary
July 2021	0 / 240	85,795	3.10%	7th (Note: Results of the Bulgarian Patriots alliance.)	Extra-parliamentary
November 2021	0 / 240	7,081	0.27%	16th	Extra-parliamentary

European Parliament
Election	# of Seats Won	# of Total Votes	% of Popular Vote	Rank
2019	0 / 17	70,830	3.62%	6th
