= Kostadin Kostadinov =

Bulgarian politician (born 1979)

- Костадин Костадинов
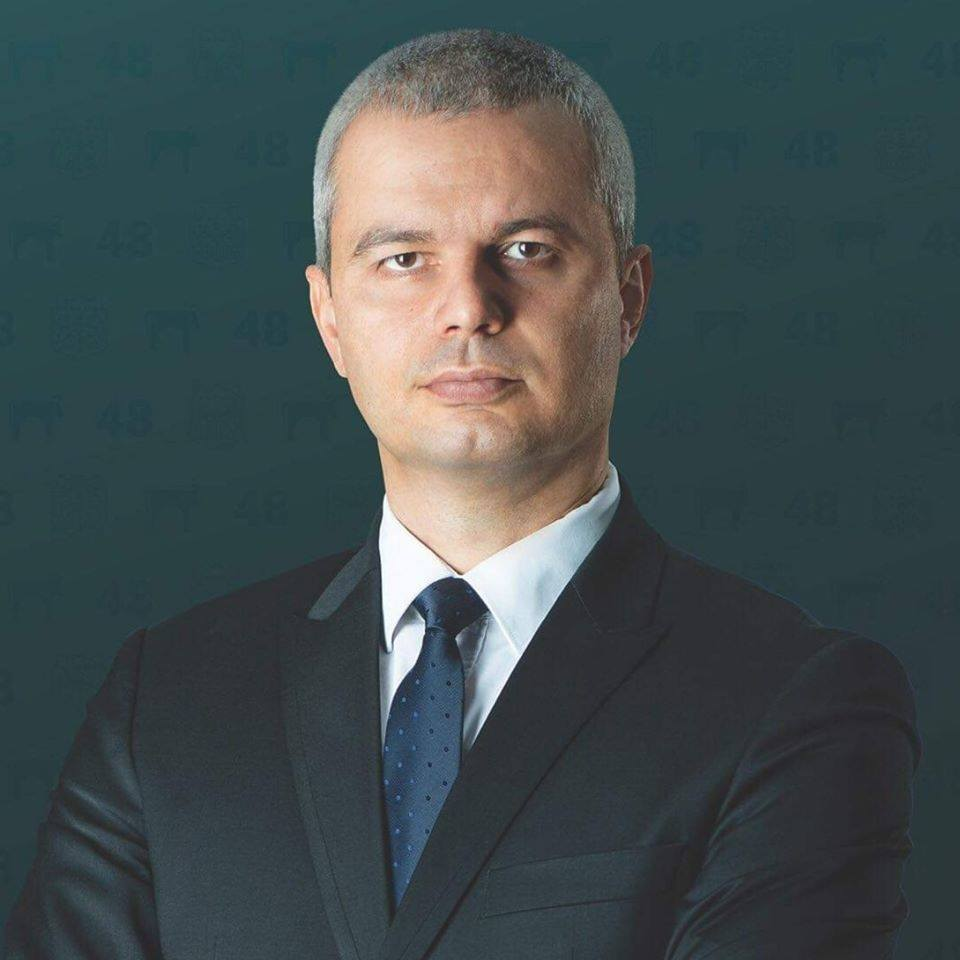
- Kostadinov in 2019

Member of the National Assembly
- Incumbent
- Assumed office 3 December 2021
- Constituency: 3rd MMC - Varna

Leader of Revival
- Incumbent
- Assumed office 2 August 2014
- Preceded by: Party established

Member of the Varna City Council
- In office 4 November 2011 – 25 November 2021

Personal details
- Born: Kostadin Todorov Kostadinov; 1 April 1979 (age 47) Asparuhovo, PR Bulgaria
- Party: Revival (2014–present)
- Other political affiliations: VMRO (2002–2012)
- Spouse: Velina (m. 2003; div. 2018)
- Children: 2
- Profession: Politician, author, historian

Kostadin Todorov Kostadinov (Bulgarian: Костадин Тодоров Костадинов; born 1 April 1979) is a Bulgarian far-right politician who is the chairman of the ultranationalist and pro-Russian Revival political party. Kostadinov is known for his right-wing populism and anti-EU stances, as well as for his anti-immigration views. His party operates according to the already established anti-European, anti-Western and pro-Russian models worldwide. Kostadin Kostadinov is known for his pro-Russian statements and frequent calls for agression, including the creation of a new people's court.A frequent pattern of his political behaviour is the instillation of hatred towards certain minorities and the opposition.

== Early life and career ==
Kostadinov was born on 1 April 1979 in Asparuhovo during the period of the People's Republic of Bulgaria. He completed his master's degree in Balkan studies in 2002 and his master's in Law in 2011 at Veliko Tarnovo University. In 2017, Kostadinov completed his Ph.D. in Ethnography and Folklore in the Ethnographic Museum of the Bulgarian Academy of Sciences. In 2004, he filmed a documentary on Bulgarians in Albania, and in 2005 published the film We are One Nation, which was directed to the Bulgarians in Aegean Macedonia. He is also the author of the film Forgotten Land, which is devoted to the Bulgarians in North Dobrudja and was filmed in 2009.

In 2016, disappointed by what he perceived as falsifications and forgeries of Bulgarian history in contemporary Bulgarian textbooks, he wrote a history textbook (Bulgarian: Учебник по Родинознание) aimed at children from grades 1st through 4th. In 2017, he released his next book, 'Guide to the Ancient Bulgarian Lands' in which over 100 revered places of Bulgarian history are named and detailed. In 2018, Kostadinov divorced his wife Velina. They have two children; Todor and Denitsa. They had been married since 2003.

== Political career ==
=== VMRO ===
In 1997, Kostadinov became a member of VMRO – Bulgarian National Movement (Bulgarian: ВМРО) and its coordinator for Northeast Bulgaria (2002–2009). He was regional coordinator for the provinces of Varna, Shumen, and Dobrich from 2002 to 2009, and from 2007 through 2012 was a member of the National Executive Committee of the party. In 2013, he left VMRO because of the re-election of its leader, Krasimir Karakachanov, and in the same year ran as a member of the National Front for the Salvation of Bulgaria (NFSB).

=== Revival party ===
In 2014, Kostadinov founded the Revival party in Bulgaria. He participated in the founding of the far-right Revival in Bulgaria in June 2014. The constituent assembly took place in Pliska. On 3 November 2019, Kostadinov and Revival went on a run-off vote for the mayor position in Varna (the third largest city in Bulgaria) and accumulated 14.3% in the first round of voting and 35.99% in the runoffs.

Revival gathered 2.45% support at the April 2021 Bulgarian parliamentary election, remaining below the 4.0% needed for entry into the parliament. In the July 2021 Bulgarian parliamentary election it gathered 2.97%. In the November 2021 Bulgarian general election, Revival gathered 4.86% and entered the parliament gaining 13 seats. In the October 2022 Bulgarian parliamentary election, Revival was fourth with 9.83% and 27 seats. In the April 2023 Bulgarian parliamentary election, it placed third with 13.58% and 37 seats. In the June 2024 Bulgarian parliamentary election, it fell back to fourth with 13.3% and 38 seats. In the October 2024 Bulgarian parliamentary election, it was rose back to third with 12.9% and 33 seats. In the 2026 Bulgarian parliamentary election, it fell to fifth with 4.1% and 13 seats as other far-right and right-wing populist failed to cross the electoral threshold.

=== Controversy ===
During his career, Kostadinov often expressed anti-Roma views, describing Roma people as "parasites" and "non-human vermin that has no place in Bulgaria". In the summer of 2020, the Court in Sofia launched a procedure for the removal of "Revival" as a political party, on the grounds that it had been fraudulently established through gathering falsified signatures. In May 2021, the Supreme Court of Cassation of Bulgaria ruled in favor of Kostadinov's party, establishing that there had been no irregularities. In September 2020, Kostadinov was detained by the police during the 2020–2021 Bulgarian protests opposing chief prosecutor Ivan Geshev and Boyko Borisov's administration.

His party was noted for its opposition to many of the control measures during the COVID-19 pandemic in Bulgaria, the promotion of COVID-19 misinformation, and strong reservations regarding the COVID-19 vaccines. In March 2022, it was revealed that Kostadinov had received a 10-year ban from entering Ukraine, which has been attributed to the staunchly pro-Russian orientation of his party in the context of the Russian invasion of Ukraine. His pro-Russian stance and activities had gained him the nickname "Kopeikin", referring to his alleged ties and alleged financial support from the Russian government. In January 2025, Kostadinov expressed support for U.S. President Donald Trump's territorial claims on Canada and the Panama Canal.

In February 2026, Bulgaria's Supreme Administrative Court issued a final ruling upholding a 2023 decision by the Commission for Protection Against Discrimination, which had been affirmed by lower courts, including the Varna Administrative Court in 2025, finding that Kostadinov had engaged in harassment and discriminatory speech against Member of Parliament Daniel Lorer of Jewish origin and from We Continue the Change – Democratic Bulgaria (PP–DB) on grounds of religion, ethnicity, and origin. The ruling concerned a series of Facebook posts by Kostadinov from 2022–2023 that referred to Lorer as a "foreigner", "national traitor", "foreign agent", "anti-human", likened him to a reptile, and suggested he wished for Bulgarians and the Bulgarian state to disappear. The court ordered Kostadinov to remove six specific posts, filter offensive comments, and cited provisions of Bulgarian anti-discrimination law and the European Convention on Human Rights.
