= Third Borisov Government =

Government of Bulgaria (2017–2021)

- 96th Cabinet of Bulgaria

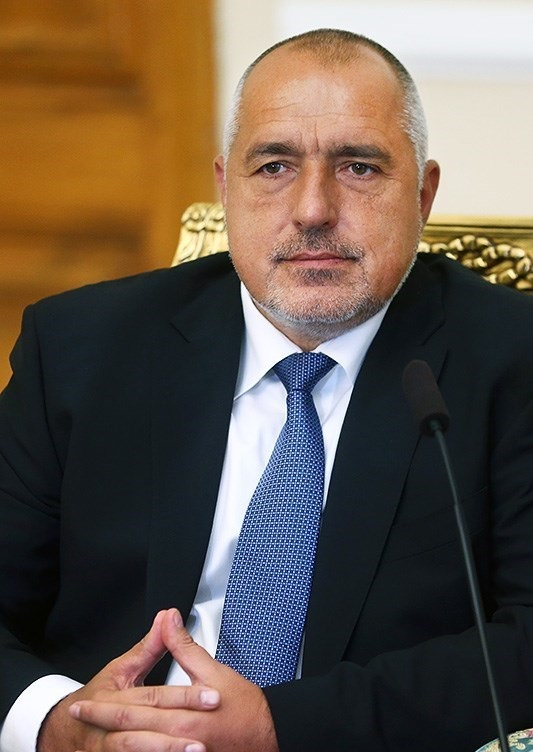
- Date formed: 4 May 2017
- Date dissolved: 12 May 2021

People and organisations
- Head of state: Rumen Radev
- Head of government: Boyko Borisov
- Member parties: GERB, United Patriots
- Status in legislature: Majority (coalition)

History
- Election: 2017
- Legislature term: 44th National Assembly
- Incoming formation: Government formation
- Predecessor: Gerdzhikov Government
- Successor: Yanev Government

The ninety-sixth Cabinet of Bulgaria took office on May 4, 2017. It was a coalition government that was chaired by Boyko Borisov. The government was formed after the Borisov's party, GERB, won the 2017 parliamentary election. However, GERB won only 95 out of 240 seats in the National Assembly and therefore needed to form a coalition in order to govern.

On 16 April 2021, the 45th National Assembly voted for his resignation with 156 votes in favor, 75 against and 9 abstentions. The government resigned and continued to serve until a new cabinet was appointed.

On 12 May 2021, the Government was dissolved.

== Formation ==
The third Borisov government consisted of ministers from the ruling GERB party and the two leaders of the junior coalition partner United Patriots.

== Cabinet ==
The third Bulgarian Council of Ministers of Bulgaria chaired by Boyko Metodiev Borisov has been voted in by 235 members of the Bulgarian Parliament (of them 134 in favor and 101 against, out of a total of 240 MPs) and sworn into term on May 4, 2017. The government was formed by the GERB Party and the parliamentary coalition of the United Patriots, with the initial support of the newcomer Volya Party of businessman Veselin Mareshki (although one of its MPs voted against). The composition of the Government was as follows:

Ministry	Incumbent	Party affiliation	Note
Prime Minister's Office	Boyko Borisov	GERB	Third term as a Prime Minister.
Deputy Prime Minister	Tomislav Donchev	GERB	Deputy Prime Minister of the Second Borisov Government.
Deputy Prime Minister in charge of economy and demographical policies	Mariyana Nikolova	nominated by the United Patriots, unaffiliated	Head of the Political Cabinet of the Deputy Prime Minister in charge of economy and demographical policies.
Deputy Prime Minister in charge of public order and national security and Minister of Defence	Krasimir Karakachanov	United Patriots (VMRO)	Leader of VMRO, member of the United Patriots coalition.
Deputy Prime Minister in charge of the judiciary reform and Minister of Foreign Affairs	Ekaterina Zakharieva	nominated by GERB, unaffiliated	Presidential advisor to President Plevneliev, Deputy Prime Minister and Minister of Regional Development in the governments of Marin Raykov and Georgi Bliznashki.
Minister of Finance	Vladislav Goranov	GERB	Minister of Finance in the Second Borisov Government. Deputy Finance Minister in First Borisov Government under Finance Minister Simeon Djankov.
Minister of Justice	Danail Kirilov	GERB	
Minister of Interior Affairs	Mladen Marinov	nominated by GERB, unaffiliated	Previously Secretary General of the Ministry of Interior.
Minister of Health	Kiril Ananiev	nominated by GERB, unaffiliated	Previously Minister of Finance in the office of Ognyan Gerdzhikov.
Minister of Education and Science	Krasimir Valchev	nominated by GERB, unaffiliated	Previously Secretary-General of the Ministry of Education and Science in the Second Borisov Government under Meglena Kuneva.
Minister of Transport, Information Technologies and Communications	Rosen Zhelyazkov	nominated by GERB, unaffiliated	Previously Chief Secretary of the Council of Ministers (2009–2013).
Minister of Energy	Temenuzhka Petkova	nominated by GERB, unaffiliated	Minister of Energy in the Second Borisov Government.
Minister of Tourism	Nikolina Angelkova	GERB	Minister of Tourism in the Second Borisov Government.
Minister of Youth and Sports	Krasen Kralev	GERB	Minister of Youth and Sports in the Second Borisov Government.
Minister in charge of the Bulgarian Presidency of the Council of the European Union in 2018	Lilyana Pavlova	GERB	Minister of Regional Development and Public Works in the Second Borisov Government.
Minister of Regional Development and Public Works	Petya Avramova	nominated by GERB, unaffiliated	Previously MP in the 44th National Assembly.
Minister of Economy	Emil Karanikolov	nominated by the United Patriots	Previously Director of the State's Agency of Privatisation. Closely associated with Delyan Peevski, a media mogul.
Minister of Labor and Social Policies	Denitsa Sacheva	nominated by the GERB	
Minister of Environment and Water Resources	Neno Dimov	nominated by the United Patriots	Previously Deputy Minister of Environment and Water Resources in the Kostov Government and member of parliament from the DSB Party.
Minister of Agriculture, Food and Forestry	Desislava Taneva	GERB	Minister of Agriculture and Food in the Second Borisov Government.
Minister of Culture	Boil Banov	nominated by the United Patriots	Previously Director of the Haskovo Theater.

== See also ==
- First Borisov Government
- Second Borisov Government
- History of Bulgaria since 1989
