= Conservative Bulgaria =

Nationalist political party in Bulgaria

Conservative Bulgaria Консервативна България
- Abbreviation: NFSB (Bulgarian, until 2023)
- Leader: Boris Yachev
- Founder: Valeri Simeonov
- Founded: 17 May 2011
- Split from: Attack
- Headquarters: Burgas
- Newspaper: Desant
- Youth wing: NFSB Youth
- TV station: SKAT
- Membership (2016): ~15,000
- Ideology: Bulgarian nationalism; National conservatism; Euroscepticism
- Political position: Right-wing
- Religion: Bulgarian Orthodox Church
- National affiliation: Blue Bulgaria (2024–) Former coalitions: Patriotic Front (2014); United Patriots (2017); Patriots for Valeri Simeonov (2019); Patriotic Coalition Volya–NFSB (2021); Bulgarian Patriots (2021); Patriotic Front (2021)
- European Parliament group: Europe of Freedom and Democracy (2013–2014)
- Colours: Bulgarian national colours: White Green Red
- National Assembly: 0 / 240
- European Parliament: 0 / 17

Website
- nfsb.bg

Conservative Bulgaria (Bulgarian: Консервативна България), previously known as National Front for the Salvation of Bulgaria (Bulgarian: Национален фронт за спасение на България, romanized: Natsionalen front za spasenie na Bŭlgariya, NFSB), is a national conservative political party in Bulgaria.

== History ==
Logo of the National Front for the Salvation of Bulgaria

The party was established on 17 May 2011 in sports hall Boycho Branzov in Burgas as the National Salvation Front for Bulgaria. Its founding was attended by over 820 people from across the country, mainly from the cities of Varna, Shumen, Asenovgrad, Pazardzhik, Plovdiv, Vratsa, Svilengrad, Lovech, Chirpan, Stara Zagora, Vidin, and Dobrich. The party was described as ultra-nationalist by foreign observers.

The party elected three leaders - Valeri Simeonov, Valentin Kasabov and Dancho Hadzhiev. The Secretary of the party is Maria Petrova. The National Political Council includes 19 people, such as independent councilors from Burgas and hosts from SKAT TV (i.e. Velizar Enchev and Valentin Fartunov).

Among the party's founders is former regional president of the Union of Democratic Forces in the city Vladimir Pavlov.

The party was a member of the Europe of Freedom and Democracy (EFD) group during the 7th European Parliament.

On 3 August 2014, a coalition agreement was signed between NFSB and VMRO called Patriotic Front for the 2014 parliamentary elections. It states its purpose to be for "a revival of the Bulgarian economy, a fight against monopolies, achieving modern education and healthcare and a fair and uncorrupt judiciary." The members of the alliance are: PROUD, National Ideal for Unity, European Middle Class, Association Patriot, Undivided Bulgaria, National Movement BG Patriot, Union of the Patriotic Forces "Defense", National Association of Alternate Soldiery "For the Honor of epaulette", National Movement for the Salvation of the Fatherland, and National Democratic Party.

Ahead of the July 2021 Bulgarian parliamentary election, Volya Movement formed an electoral alliance with the National Front for the Salvation of Bulgaria and the VMRO.

On 1 February 2023, the party officially renamed itself as "Conservative Bulgaria" and elected a new Chairman, Boris Yachev.

== Leadership ==
- Leader - Boris Yachev
- Vice-leader - Venera Simeonova
- Vice-leader - Dancho Hadzhiev
- Vice-leader - Hristian Mitev

== Election results ==
=== Presidential ===
The party nominated Stefan Solakov as their presidential candidate in 2011 and Galina Vasileva as his running mate.

They finished 5th, receiving 84,205 votes (2.50% of ballots cast).

In the 2021 Bulgarian general election, the party nominated its leader, Valeri Simeonov, as the Presidential candidate from the Patriotic Front coalition.

| Election | Candidate | First round | | Second round | | Result |
| Election | Candidate | Votes | % | Votes | % | Result |
|---|---|---|---|---|---|---|
| 2011 | Stefan Solakov | 84,250 | 2.50% | | | Lost ✗ |
| 2016 | Krasimir Karakachanov (OP) | 573,016 | 14.97% | | | Lost ✗ |
| 2021 | Valeri Simeonov (PF) | 8,568 | 0.32% | | | Lost ✗ |

=== National Assembly ===
In the parliamentary elections on May 12, the "National Front for the Salvation of Bulgaria" won 3.7% of the votes, but fell below the 4% threshold needed for representation. Nonetheless the party polled more votes than the UDF, DSB and OLJ, all of whom were represented in the last (41st) National Assembly.

| Election | Leader | Votes | % | Seats | +/– | Government |
|---|---|---|---|---|---|---|
| 2013 | Valeri Simeonov | 131,169 | 3.70 (#5) | 0 / 240 | New | Extra-parliamentary |
| 2014 (Note: Run as part of the Patriotic Front coalition.) | Valeri Simeonov | 239,101 | 7.28 (#5) | 19 / 240 | ▲19 | Opposition |
| 2017 (Note: Run as part of the United Patriots coalition.) | Valeri Simeonov | 318,513 | 9.07 (#3) | 9 / 240 | ▼10 | Coalition |
| Apr 2021 (Note: Run as part of the Patriotic Coalition Volya–NFSB coalition.) | Valeri Simeonov | 75,926 | 2.34 (#10) | 0 / 240 | ▼9 | Extra-parliamentary |
| Jul 2021 (Note: Run as part of the Bulgarian Patriots coalition.) | Valeri Simeonov | 85,795 | 3.10 (#7) | 0 / 240 | 0 | Extra-parliamentary |
| Nov 2021 (Note: Run as part of the Patriotic Front coalition.) | Valeri Simeonov | 8,584 | 0.32 (#15) | 0 / 240 | 0 | Extra-parliamentary |
| 2022 | Valeri Simeonov | 3,520 | 0.14 (#24) | 0 / 240 | 0 | Extra-parliamentary |
| 2023 | Did not contest | | | 0 / 240 | 0 | Extra-parliamentary |
| Jun 2024 (Note: Run as part of the Blue Bulgaria coalition.) | Boris Yachev | 33,613 | 1.52 (#9) | 0 / 240 | 0 | Extra-parliamentary |
| Oct 2024 | Boris Yachev | 26,054 | 1.03 (#10) | 0 / 240 | 0 | Extra-parliamentary |

=== European Parliament ===
| Election | List leader | Votes | % | Seats | +/– | EP Group |
|---|---|---|---|---|---|---|
| 2014 | Valeri Simeonov | 68,376 | 3.05 (#7) | 0 / 17 | New | – |
| 2019 (Note: Run as part of the Patriots for Valeri Simeonov coalition.) | Valeri Simeonov | 22,421 | 1.15 (#9) | 0 / 17 | 0 | – |
| 2024 (Note: Run as part of the Blue Bulgaria coalition.) | Tsveta Kirilova | 24,917 | 1.24 (#10) | 0 / 17 | 0 | – |

=== Local ===
In the local elections in Burgas in 2011, party chairman Valeri Simeonov finished in second place, with 11.25% of the votes.
