= Krasen Kralev =

Bulgarian businessman and politician

Krassen Kralev
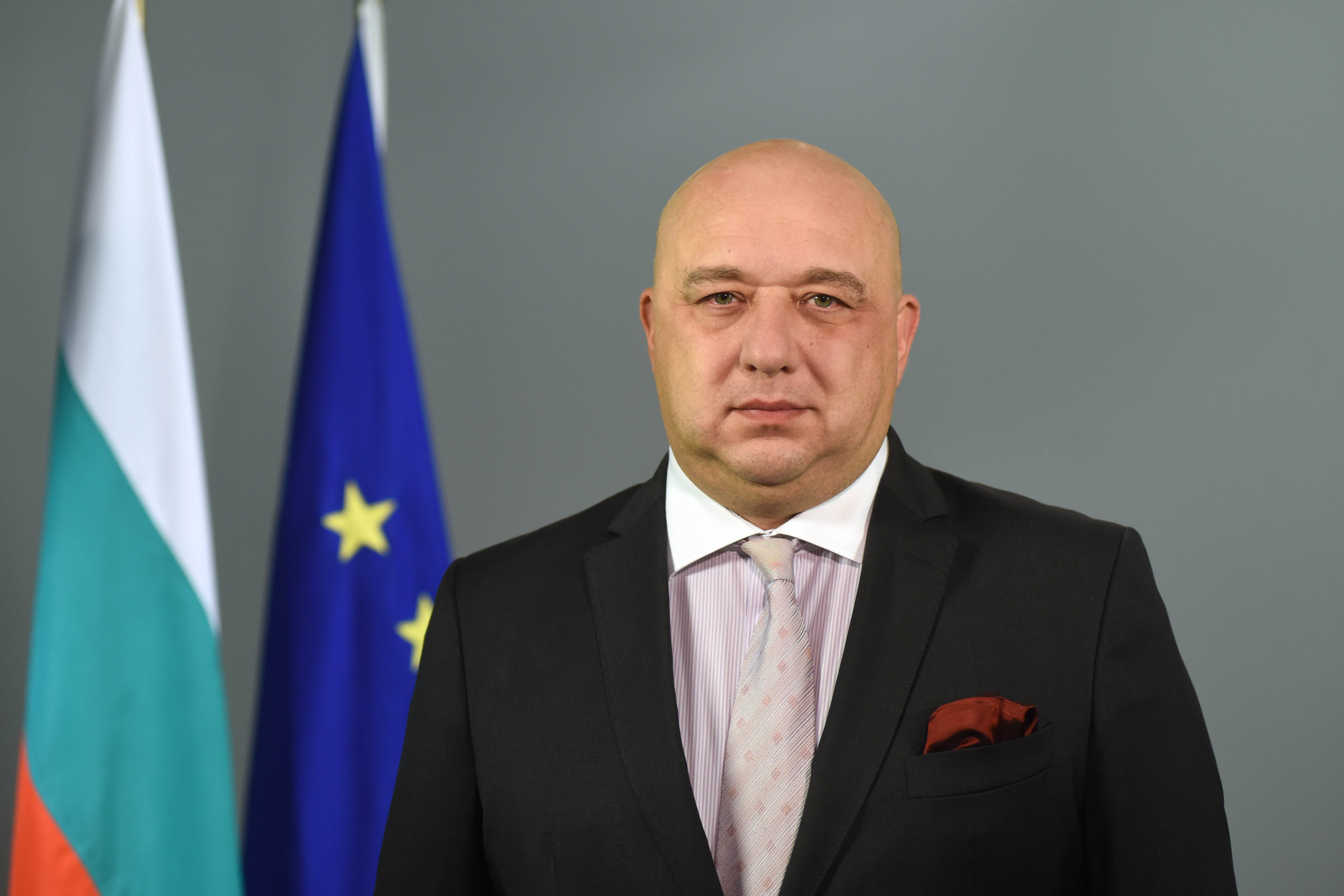

Personal details
- Born: 2 January 1967 (age 59) Varna, Bulgaria
- Profession: Politician, businessman

Krassen Kirilov Kralev (Bulgarian: Красен Кирилов Кралев), born 2 January 1967 in Varna, is a Bulgarian businessman and politician, who was the Minister of Youth and Sports of Bulgaria as part of the Second Borisov Government and Third Borisov Government.

== Biography ==
Born in Varna, Kralev earned a degree from the Medical University in the city, subsequently making specializations in global marketing in the Association of the National as well as management of political campaigns at the University of South Carolina (1990) and Association of the National Advertisers of USA (1997). He is an expert in the field of public communications.

In his youth, he was a long-distance runner. In 1986, Kralev was the holder of the Bulgarian youth national record for 20 000 m. He participated in the 1986 and 1987 Balkaniads, earning third place as part of the national cross country team.

Kralev founded MAG Communications and has served as the Chairman of the company's board of directors since 1992 until September 2014. He is co-founder of the Bulgarian Association for Free and Fair Elections (Bulgarian: Българско сдружение за честни избори) and was formerly a consultant at the National Democratic Institute of the United States.

He has also been involved in various professional capacities with the Cherno More football club, serving as its chairman on two occasions (1998–2001, 2003–2007).

Since 2010, Kralev has been the head of the indoor football commission of the Bulgarian Football Union.

Kralev is among the founding members of the "New Age" (Bulgarian: "Новото Време") political party and was its deputy leader until 2012. He participated in the 2009 Bulgarian parliamentary election as part of a coalition with the Lider (Bulgarian: "Лидер") party.

He owns the "Alternative Media Group" EOOD and "Web Media Group" AD Internet companies.

On 7 November 2014, Kralev assumed his duties as Minister of Youth and Sports of Bulgaria, succeeding Evgenia Radanova. He retained his position when the Third Borisov Government was formed on 4 May 2017.

In January 2017, Krassen Kralev presented his first solo painting exhibition. The profit has been donated to the "Bulgarian Sports" Foundation.

In November 2017, Krassen Kralev was elected as a member of the Board of the World Anti-Doping Agency (WADA), representing the European Union.

On 23 August 2020, Kralev tested positive for COVID-19. He recovered in September 2020 after spending time in the intensive care unit of "St. Marina" hospital in Varna.
