= Patriotic Front (Bulgaria, 2014) =

Patriotic Front Патриотичен фронт
- Leader: Krasimir Karakachanov; Valeri Simeonov
- Founded: 3 August 2014
- Dissolved: 27 January 2017
- Succeeded by: United Patriots
- Headquarters: Sofia, Bulgaria
- Ideology: Right-wing nationalism; National conservatism; Right-wing populism
- Political position: Right-wing
- European Parliament group: European Conservatives and Reformists
- Colours: White, Green, Red (Bulgarian national colours)
- National Assembly: 0 / 240
- European Parliament: 1 / 17

Patriotic Front (Bulgarian: Патриотичен фронт) was a nationalist electoral alliance in Bulgaria between political parties VMRO and NFSB.

== History ==
VMRO ran as part of an electoral alliance led by the political party Bulgaria Without Censorship (BWC) during the 2014 European parliamentary election, where both allied parties won a seat in the European Parliament. The signing of the coalition agreement between VMRO and NFSB marked the end of the BWC-VMRO coalition. The coalition agreement forming Patriotic Front was signed on 3 August 2014 and stated its goals to be "a revival of the Bulgarian economy, a fight against monopolies, achieving modern education and healthcare and a fair and uncorrupt judiciary."

The members of the alliance included PROUD, National Ideal for Unity, Middle European Class, Association Patriot, Undivided Bulgaria, National Movement BG Patriot, Union of the Patriotic Forces "Defense", Revival of the Fatherland, National Association of Alternate Soldiery "For the Honor of epaulette", National Movement for the Salvation of the Fatherland and National Democratic Party.

In 2016, the Patriotic Front successfully lobbied for a ban on the Burqa.

== Elections ==
The coalition's electoral debut took place in the 2014 parliamentary election.

=== Statistics ===
Bulgarian National Assembly
Election	# of seats won	# of total votes	% of popular vote	rank
2014	19 / 240	239,101	7.29%	5th
2017	0 / 240			

== See also ==
- Attack (political party)
- National Front (France)
- United Patriots Nationalist electoral alliance (2016-Since)
