= People's Voice (Bulgaria) =

People's Voice Глас народен
- Leader: Svetoslav Vitkov
- Founded: 2013
- Headquarters: Gorski Patnik 1, Sofia, Bulgaria
- Ideology: Populism; Conservatism
- Colours: Dark blue, Dark red
- National Assembly: 0 / 240
- European Parliament: 0 / 17
- Municipalities: 3 / 265

Website
- glasnaroden.bg/

People's Voice (Bulgarian: Глас народен) is a political party in Bulgaria, founded by Svetoslav Vitkov in 2013.

== History ==
The party was established in 2013 by popular Bulgarian punk and ska musician Svetoslav Vitkov just prior to the parliamentary election and achieved relative success by winning 1,34% of the total vote. This result placed it as the 13th largest party in the country, with just a few weeks of campaigning and little to no financial support.

The party became the first one to open its list for the European Parliament election in 2014 to all people willing to participate. Following a series of events, including public debates on European policies, a lie-detector test, and Facebook voting, the party announced its 17 candidates, with most of them having never been involved in politics before. The top two candidates were well-known - Bulgarian Academy of Sciences member and activist Hristo Lafchiev, and political scientist and renowned football fan Aleksandar Alekov. The party soon became known for its provocative, fun and socially open rhetoric, including penalty shoot-outs with other politicians and scandalous video clips.

At the European Parliament elections in May 2014, People's Voice placed 9th with 1,002% of the vote. In the parliamentary elections held in October 2014, the party 37,335 votes, enough to earn it 10th place with 1.14% of the vote.

People's Voice attempted to enter the 2016 presidential election, initially opting for a coalition with The Greens. Their candidate for president was Svetoslav Vitkov, while his running-mate was Ivan Velkov, a Deputy Chairman of the municipal councilor in Sofia. However, on October 5, 2016 their registration in the elections was denied due to an insufficient number of signatures gathered prior to the final deadline for doing so.

At the 2017 parliamentary election, People's Voice entered a coalition with the Reformist Bloc, with Vitkov announced as the top candidate for the 25th electoral district, one of three that comprise the capital Sofia.

The party announced that it would be contesting the 2023 parliamentary election, despite their disappointment with previous election results, justifying it by saying that a "true change" as was hoped for in the 90s is needed.

== Election results ==
=== National Assembly ===
Election	Leader	Votes	%	Seats	+/–	Position after the election
2013	Svetoslav Vitkov	47,419	1.34 (#13)	0 / 240	New	Extra-parliamentary
2014	Svetoslav Vitkov	37,335	1.14 (#10)	0 / 240	0	Extra-parliamentary
2017 (Note: Run as part of Reformist Bloc.)	Svetoslav Vitkov	107,407	3.14 (#6)	0 / 240	0	Extra-parliamentary
Apr 2021	Svetoslav Vitkov	8,330	0.26 (#17)	0 / 240	0	Extra-parliamentary
Jul 2021	Svetoslav Vitkov	4,741	0.17 (#14)	0 / 240	0	Extra-parliamentary
Nov 2021	Svetoslav Vitkov	11,548	0.43 (#13)	0 / 240	0	Extra-parliamentary
2022	Svetoslav Vitkov	6,197	0.24 (#15)	0 / 240	0	Extra-parliamentary
2023	Svetoslav Vitkov	5,560	0.21 (#15)	0 / 240	0	Extra-parliamentary
Jun 2024	Svetoslav Vitkov	6,560	0.30 (#16)	0 / 240	0	Extra-parliamentary
Oct 2024	Svetoslav Vitkov	7,298	0.29 (#14)	0 / 240	0	Extra-parliamentary
2026	Svetoslav Vitkov	4,666	0.14 (#19)	0 / 240	0	Extra-parliamentary

=== European Parliament ===
Election	List leader	Votes	%	Seats	+/–	EP Group
2014	Hristo Lafchiev	22,440	1.00 (#9)	0 / 17	New	–
2019	Veneta Magistrelli	6,136	0.31 (#16)	0 / 17	0	–
2024	Svetoslav Vitkov	6,136	0.31 (#16)	0 / 17	0	–
