= Velizar Enchev =

Bulgarian politician and journalist

Velizar Penkov Enchev
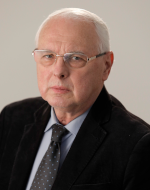

Personal details
- Born: 7 January 1953 (age 73) Galabovo, Stara Zagora Province, People's Republic of Bulgaria
- Party: Bulgarian Communist Party (before 1989); Union of Democratic Forces (1990-1997); Independent (1997-2005); National Front for the Salvation of Bulgaria (2011-2014); Patriotic Front (2014); Attack (2005-2011); Movement for Radical Change Bulgarian Spring (2015-present)
- Profession: Journalist, Politician

Velizar Penkov Enchev (Bulgarian: Велизар Пенков Енчев) (born 7 January 1953) is a Bulgarian politician and journalist, who is a former member of the NFSB party. He has been a member of the National Parliament.

== Biography ==
Born in Galabovo, but graduating from a high school in the capital of Bulgaria, Enchev studied journalism at Sofia University and worked as a correspondent for the Bulgarian National Television in Yugoslavia between 1987 and 1993. He also holds a doctorate in international law and international relations.

Enchev formerly served as ambassador of Bulgaria to Croatia in the period from 1997 to 2002. He has also taught university courses on Balkan issues at the South-West University.
