= July 2021 Bulgarian parliamentary election =

- 11 July 2021
- All 240 seats in the 46th National Assembly; 121 seats needed for a majority
- Turnout: 41.63% (▼7.47pp)
Party	Leader	Vote %	Seats	+/–
ITN	Slavi Trifonov	24.08	65	+14
GERB–SDS	Boyko Borisov	23.51	63	−12
BSPzB	Korneliya Ninova	13.39	36	−7
DB	A. Atanasov & H. Ivanov	12.64	34	+7
DPS	Mustafa Karadayi	10.71	29	−1
ISMV	Maya Manolova	5.01	13	−1
This lists parties that won seats. See the complete results below.

Prime Minister before	Prime Minister after
Stefan Yanev (caretaker); Independent (First Yanev Government)	Stefan Yanev (caretaker); Independent (Second Yanev Government)

Snap parliamentary elections were held in Bulgaria on 11 July 2021 after no party was able or willing to form a government following the April 2021 elections. The populist party There Is Such a People (ITN), led by musician and television host Slavi Trifonov, narrowly won the most seats over a coalition of the conservative GERB and Union of Democratic Forces parties. Four other parties (the leftist BSP for Bulgaria, the liberal alliance Democratic Bulgaria, the centrist Turkish minority party Movement for Rights and Freedoms, and the anti-corruption Stand Up! Mafia, Get Out!) won seats in the 240-member Parliament as well.

ITN's success was propelled primarily by young voters. The Organization for Security and Co-operation in Europe (OSCE) assessed the election as being "competitive" and with "fundamental freedoms being generally respected." On 6 September, BSP handed back the last mandate of forming a government, meaning the parliament would be dissolved and a third parliamentary election would officially take place in 2021. President Radev declared on 11 September that there would be '2-in-1' elections on November 14 for the first time in Bulgarian history, where voters will be able to vote for the president and the parliament. This decision was taken 'to save treasury costs and voters time'.

== Background ==
The previous election in April saw the ruling GERB party win 75 seats, with 51 seats for There Is Such A People (ITN), 43 for BSP for Bulgaria, 30 for the Movement for Rights and Freedoms, 27 for Democratic Bulgaria and 14 seats for Stand Up! Mafia, Get Out!. After Boyko Borisov of GERB and Slavi Trifonov of There Is Such A People (ITN) were unable to form governments, the BSP stated that they would refuse the mandate to form the government, as the three anti-corruption parties (ITN, Democratic Bulgaria and ISMV) were unwilling to work with them.

== Electoral system ==
The 240 members of the National Assembly are elected by open list proportional representation from 31 multi-member constituencies ranging in size from 4 to 16 seats. The electoral threshold is 4% for parties, with seats allocated according to the largest remainder method.

== Parties and coalitions ==
=== Parliamentary parties ===
Party	Main ideology	Leader	Current seats
GERB–SDS	Conservatism	Boyko Borisov	75
ITN	Populism	Slavi Trifonov	51
BSPzB	Democratic socialism	Korneliya Ninova	43
DPS	Turkish minority interests	Mustafa Karadayi	30
DB	Liberal conservatism	Hristo Ivanov	27
ISMV	Social liberalism	Maya Manolova	14

=== Other parties ===
In May 2021, VMRO – Bulgarian National Movement formed an alliance with fellow neo-nationalists Volya Movement and National Front for the Salvation of Bulgaria in an alliance called Bulgarian Patriots.

Party	Main ideology	Leader	Current seats
Bulgarian National Union – New Democracy	Ultranationalism	Boris Ivanov; Bogdan Yotsov	No seats
Bulgarian Patriots	National conservatism	Yulian Angelov	No seats
Revival	Bulgarian nationalism	Kostadin Kostadinov	No seats
Bulgarian Summer	Direct democracy	Boril Sokolov	No seats
RzB	Conservatism	Tsvetan Tsvetanov	No seats
Left Union	Socialism	Nikolay Malinov	No seats

== Opinion polls ==
Local regression of polls conducted, excluding "none of the above"

The opinion poll results below were recalculated from the original data and excludes pollees that chose 'I will not vote' or 'I am uncertain'.

Polling firm	Fieldwork date	Sample size	GERB–SDS	ITN	BSPzB	DPS	DB	ISMV	BP			Revival	BL	RzB	Left Union	Others / None	Lead
Polling firm	Fieldwork date	Sample size	GERB–SDS	ITN	BSPzB	DPS	DB	ISMV	VMRO	Volya	NFSB	Revival	BL	RzB	Left Union	Others / None	Lead
July 2021 election	11 July 2021	–	23.2%	23.8%	13.2%	10.6%	12.5%	4.9%	3.1%			3.0%	1.8%	0.3%	0.4%	3.2%	0.6%
Alpha Research / BNT	Exit polls (20:00)	—N/a	23.5%	22.3%	14.1%	11.7%	14.1%	5.5%	3.2%			2.3%	1.3%	–	0.3%	1.7%	1.2%
Gallup / BNT	Exit polls (20:00)	—N/a	22.1%	21.5%	15.1%	11.8%	13.7%	4.9%	3.3%			3.2%	2.2%	–	0.3%	1.8%	0.6%
Alpha Research	4–7 July 2021	1013	21.5%	21.8%	16.4%	11.1%	12%	5.4%	3.8%			3.2%	1.2%	–	0.5%	3.1%	0.3%
Trend	3-7 July 2021	1002	20.5%	21.3%	15.9%	11.3%	12.4%	5.1%	3.9%			3.1%	1.6%	–	0.8%	4.1%	0.8%
Gallup	30 Jun–7 July 2021	1010	20.3%	21.3%	15.9%	11.5%	12.2%	6.1%	4%			3.1%	2.5%	–	1%	2.1%	1%
Sova Harris	2–6 July 2021	1000	22.6%	22.1%	16%	10.9%	10.6%	5.3%	4.5%			–	–	–	–	8%	0.5%
Exacta	1–5 July 2021	1005	21.4%	20.8%	15.8%	11.2%	12.8%	4.8%	4%			2.8%	1.8%	–	–	4.6%	0.6%
Mediana	26 June–2 July 2021	920	22.5%	21.7%	20.6%	11.1%	10%	5.1%	4.8%			2.2%	–	–	–	2%	0.8%
Nasoca	23–30 Jun 2021	1025	21.4%	20.5%	15.8%	10.5%	11.3%	5.3%	4.4%			2.3%	2.1%	–	–	6.4%	0.9%
Specter	24–27 Jun 2021	703	21.4%	19.7%	14.5%	10.5%	12.2%	5.0%	5.2%			2.4%	0.9%	0.5%	1.3%	6.4%	1.7%
Market links	18–25 Jun 2021	626	21.8%	20.8%	18.7%	10.5%	13.8%	6%	3.2%			2.7%	1.4%	–	–	1.1%	1%
Barometer	18–23 June 2021	860	22.5%	18.2%	17.1%	11.6%	9.1%	4.3%	6.4%			1.4%	–	1.2%	1.9%	6.2%	4.3%
Trend	11–18 Jun 2021	1,003	21.7%	20.2%	16.1%	10.9%	11.2%	5.0%	3.9%			2.3%	1.9%	–	1.1%	5.7%	1.5%
Sova Harris	10–15 Jun 2021	1,000	22.4%	21.7%	18.7%	11.4%	11.1%	5.4%	4.9%			–	–	–	–	4.4%	0.7%
Mediana	10–15 Jun 2021	1,008	21.4%	24.0%	21.3%	11.2%	7.2%	6.9%	5.1%			1.5%	–	–	–	1.4%	2.6%
Gallup	3–11 Jun 2021	1,012	21.0%	21.2%	15.9%	11.9%	12.1%	5.8%	3.5%			2.7%	2.4%	–	–	3.5%	0.2%
Specter	5–10 Jun 2021	731	21.0%	19.4%	14.1%	10.3%	11.5%	4.8%	4.8%			2.8%	0.9%	0.9%	1.5%	8.0%	1.6%
Alpha Research	30 May–7 Jun 2021	1,007	20.3%	18.2%	14.4%	9.9%	11.9%	5.3%	3.4%			2.8%	1.1%	–	1.8%	10.9%	2.1%
Barometer	1–6 Jun 2021	840	24.1%	17.1%	16.9%	11.3%	8.9%	4.1%	6.1%			1.5%	–	1.3%	1.1%	7.6%	7.0%
Market Links	19–27 May 2021	676	23.7%	19.8%	19.3%	10.6%	13.3%	4.8%	4.6%			2%	–	–	–	2%	3.9%
CAM (Note: Includes voter-only data.)	14–21 May 2021	–	23.8%	20.9%	18.0%	10.5%	11.4%	4.4%	3.7%			1.9%	–	–	–	5.5%	2.9%
Gallup	7–14 May 2021	812	22.8%	20.1%	16.1%	11.2%	11.6%	5.6%	3.1%	1.4%	–	2.6%	2.8%	–	–	6.9%	2.7%
Market Links (Note: Includes voters and non-voters.) (Note: The sum of all percentages is above or below 100.)	16–23 Apr 2021	1,053	23.2%	22.3%	18.1%	10.3%	13.1%	6.5%	3.3%	–	–	1.9%	–	–	–	1.4%	0.9%
Gallup	12–14 Apr 2021	831	27.2%	23.2%	13.8%	10.4%	12.0%	4.3%	–	–	–	–	–	–	–	–	4.0%
April 2021 election	4 Apr 2021	–	25.8%	17.4%	14.8%	10.4%	9.3%	4.6%	3.6%	2.3%		2.4%	2.9%	1.3%	0.5%	4.7%	8.4%

Graphical representation of recalculated data:

== Campaign ==
During the buildup to the April election, Borisov sought to increase his party's share of the rural vote, making campaign stops at small villages in the Rhodope Mountains. The April election showed a clear divide between rural and urban areas of the country; towns favored established parties, while Sofia and other cities went predominantly for new opposition parties, including ITN. Reporters predicted these trends would influence the July election as well.

== Results ==
There Is Such a People received the most votes, finishing around 15,000 votes ahead of GERB–SDS. It was the first time that GERB or a GERB-led coalition had not won the most votes or seats since the party's establishment in 2006. Four other parties (BSP for Bulgaria, Democratic Bulgaria, Movement for Rights and Freedom, and Stand Up! Mafia, Get Out!) also won seats. There Is Such a People performed well among young voters, with 37.4% of Generation Z supporting the party and 30.9% of voters aged 30–39. GERB–SDS received high support from voters aged 40–69, and BSP for Bulgaria received high support from voters older than 70.

International observers from the Organization for Security and Co-operation in Europe said freedoms were respected in the election.

Party	Votes	%	Seats	+/–
There Is Such a People	657,829	23.78	65	+14
GERB–SDS	642,165	23.21	63	–12
BSP for Bulgaria	365,695	13.22	36	–7
Democratic Bulgaria	345,331	12.48	34	+7
Movement for Rights and Freedoms	292,514	10.57	29	–1
Stand Up! Mafia, Get Out!	136,885	4.95	13	–1
Bulgarian Patriots	85,795	3.10	0	0
Revival	82,147	2.97	0	0
Bulgarian Summer	49,833	1.80	0	New
Attack	12,585	0.45	0	0
Left Union for a Clean and Holy Republic	10,309	0.37	0	New
Republicans for Bulgaria	8,546	0.31	0	0
National Union of the Right	7,872	0.28	0	New
People's Voice	4,741	0.17	0	0
Bulgarian National Union – New Democracy	4,690	0.17	0	0
Freedom	4,304	0.16	0	New
Bulgaria of Labor and Reason	3,948	0.14	0	New
Together for Change	3,445	0.12	0	0
Morality, Initiative and Patriotism	3,427	0.12	0	New
Party of the Greens	3,257	0.12	0	0
Direct Democracy	3,143	0.11	0	0
Brigade	2,187	0.08	0	New
Rise	862	0.03	0	New
Independents	142	0.01	0	0
None of the above	35,201	1.27	–	–
Total	2,766,853	100.00	240	0
Valid votes	2,766,853	99.66		
Invalid/blank votes	9,342	0.34		
Total votes	2,776,195	100.00		
Registered voters/turnout	6,668,540	41.63		
Source: CIK, IFES

=== Voter demographics ===
Gallup exit polling suggested the following demographic breakdown. The parties which received below 4% of the vote are included in 'Others':

Voter demographics
Social group	% ITN	% GERB–SDS	% BSP	% DB	% DPS	% ISMV	% BP	% Revival	% Others	% Lead
Exit Poll Result	22.3	22.2	15	12	10	5	3	3	8	0.1
Final Result	24	23	13	12	11	5	3	3	6	1
Gender
Men	22	21	14	12	12	4	3	3	9	1
Women	21	22	16	14	9	5	3	3	7	1
Age
18–30	33	13	6	18	10	4	3	3	10	15
30-60	23	22	11	15	10	5	3	4	7	1
60+	10	25	31	7	11	4	3	2	7	5
Highest Level of Education
Lower Education	16	10	18	1	45	3	2	1	4	27
Secondary Education	23	24	17	8	11	4	3	3	7	1
Higher Education	22	21	14	21	3	6	3	4	6	1
Ethnic Group
Bulgarian	23	23	17	15	2	5	3	4	8	0
Turkic	4	13	6	1	71	1	0	0	4	58
Roma	19	20	15	2	28	3	3	0	10	8
Location
Towns and Villages	15	22	16	5	29	1	2	2	8	7
Smaller Cities	24	22	21	8	9	4	3	4	5	2
Larger Cities	25	21	14	14	2	6	4	4	10	4
Sofia	16	21	10	32	1	6	3	3	8	11

== Aftermath ==
The Organization for Security and Co-operation in Europe issued a statement that "Bulgaria's early parliamentary elections were competitive and fundamental freedoms were generally respected. The campaign environment was dominated by mutual accusations of corruption between the former ruling party and the provisional government, as well as by efforts by law-enforcement to curb vote-buying."

The elections resulted in a narrow victory for the newly established There Is Such A People (ITN) party over the ruling GERB party. However, ITN won only 65 out of 240 seats in the National Assembly. Following the elections, ITN opted to try and form a minority government and started talks with potential partners (DB, IBG-NI & BSP) in order to secure their support. Nevertheless, these attempts proved unsuccessful and as a result ITN announced on 10 August that they were withdrawing their proposed cabinet, making a third election more likely. The leader of ITN, Slavi Trifonov, said in a video statement “This means new elections". The mandate to form a cabinet went to GERB. GERB, the party of the previous prime minister, Boyko Borisov, said earlier "it would not try to form a government". The BSP said that if the scenario repeats itself, it would suggest that the current caretaker cabinet becomes permanent. IBG-NI also expressed confidence that it could come up with a solution if handed the mandate to form a government. Trifonov subsequently announced that he would not support any other parties proposing a cabinet. Parliament announced on 2 September that Bulgaria would hold the first round of the presidential election on November 14, with a snap parliamentary election likely to take place in the same month. On 6 September, the BSP handed back the last mandate of forming a government, meaning the parliament would be dissolved and a third parliamentary election would officially take place in 2021. President Rumen Radev declared on 11 September that there would be 2-in-1 elections on November 14 for the first time in Bulgarian history, where voters would be able to vote on the president and the parliament. This decision was taken "to save treasury costs and voters time".
