= Lozan Panov =

Bulgarian judge

Lozan Yordanov Panov (Bulgarian: Лозан Панов) is a Bulgarian judge and the chairman of the Supreme Court. He ran unsuccessfully for president in the 2021 Bulgarian Presidential Election, with his election bid supported by Democratic Bulgaria.

== Early life and education ==
He was born on March 28, 1971, in Sofia. In 1995 he graduated in law from Sofia University.

== Legal career ==
In the mid 1990s, Panov was a trainee judge in the Sofia District Court. After this, he became Chief Legal Advisor in the Insurance Supervision of the Ministry of Finance for 2 years. Then, in 1998 he became a junior judge in Sofia, being promoted to a full judge in 1999. He held various positions as a judge until 2007, since which he has been the Chairman of the Administrative Court in Sofia, to which he was elected by a decision of the Supreme Judicial Council on December 20, 2006. On January 29, 2015, he was elected Chairman of the Supreme Court of Cassation. He was appointed to this position by decree on February 3, 2015, by President Rosen Plevneliev.

== Political career ==
Panov announced his candidacy for the 2021 Presidential Election through a campaign group Justice for All initiative on 2 October. He was soon endorsed by the electoral coalition Democratic Bulgaria, a centre-right anti-corruption party. He is running as an independent and his running mate is Maria Kasimova-Moase, who is a journalist and civil activist. His platform is centred around continuing the fight against corruption in Bulgaria and reforming the judicial system.
