= Movement for an Equal Public Model =

Movement for an Equal Public Model Движение за равноправен обществен модел
- Leader: Iliya Iliev
- Founded: 15 December 2002
- Ideology: Liberalism; Romani minority interests

The Movement for an Equal Public Model (Bulgarian: Движение за равноправен обществен модел, romanized: Dvizhenie za ravnopraven obshtestven model) is a political party in Bulgaria representing Romani minority interests, founded on 15 December 2002 and registered as a party on 14 March 2003. It was part of the United Democratic Forces when it ran in its first legislative elections on 25 June 2005. The electoral alliance won 8.4% of the popular vote and 20 out of 240 seats.

In the 2007 Bulgarian local elections, the party participated with its candidates in 71 municipalities. They received a total of 9,686 votes and had six municipal councilors elected.
