= National Ideal for Unity =

National Ideal for Unity Национален Идеал за Единство
- Leader: Petko Atanasov
- Founded: 2010
- Dissolved: 2014
- Split from: IMRO – BNM
- Merged into: National Front for the Salvation of Bulgaria
- Headquarters: Plovdiv, Bulgaria
- Newspaper: Patriot
- Ideology: Bulgarian nationalism Right-wing populism
- Political position: Right-wing
- International affiliation: None
- Colours: Red, Black
- National Assembly: 0 / 240
- European Parliament: 0 / 17

Party flag

Website
- vmro-nie.bg

The National Ideal for Unity or NIU (Natsionalen Ideal za Edinstvo) (Bulgarian: Национален идеал за единство), was a nationalist political party in Bulgaria. Until 2012 the party's name was IMRO – National Ideal for Unity (IMRO–NIU).

== History ==
The party was founded in 2010 when a group of members of IMRO – Bulgarian National Movement led by Plovdiv mayor Slavcho Atanasov separated from the party. This happened shortly after the extraordinary congress of the IMRO – BNM on 18 October 2009, when Atanasov wasn't elected as leader of the party in place of Karakachanov.

The structure of the management of "IMRO - National Ideal for Unity" is the National Executive Committee composed of 21 people, the National political Council, National Control Commission, district committees, local organizations.

In the Presidential elections in 2011 "IMRO - National Ideal for Unity" did not nominate their own candidate and did not publicly support any other candidate. At the same time held local elections in Plovdiv, Slavcho Atanasov lost a runoff election for mayor. The party was involved in various coalitions whose candidates won in Karlovo, Kresna, Kyustendil, Montana, Topolovgrad, Haskovo Municipality.

In September 2012 the party changed its name to only National Ideal for Unity. In early 2014 the structures of the party merged into National Front for the Salvation of Bulgaria and nominated their candidates for European parliament elections in 2014.
