= Maria Koleva =

Writer and film-maker (1940–2025)

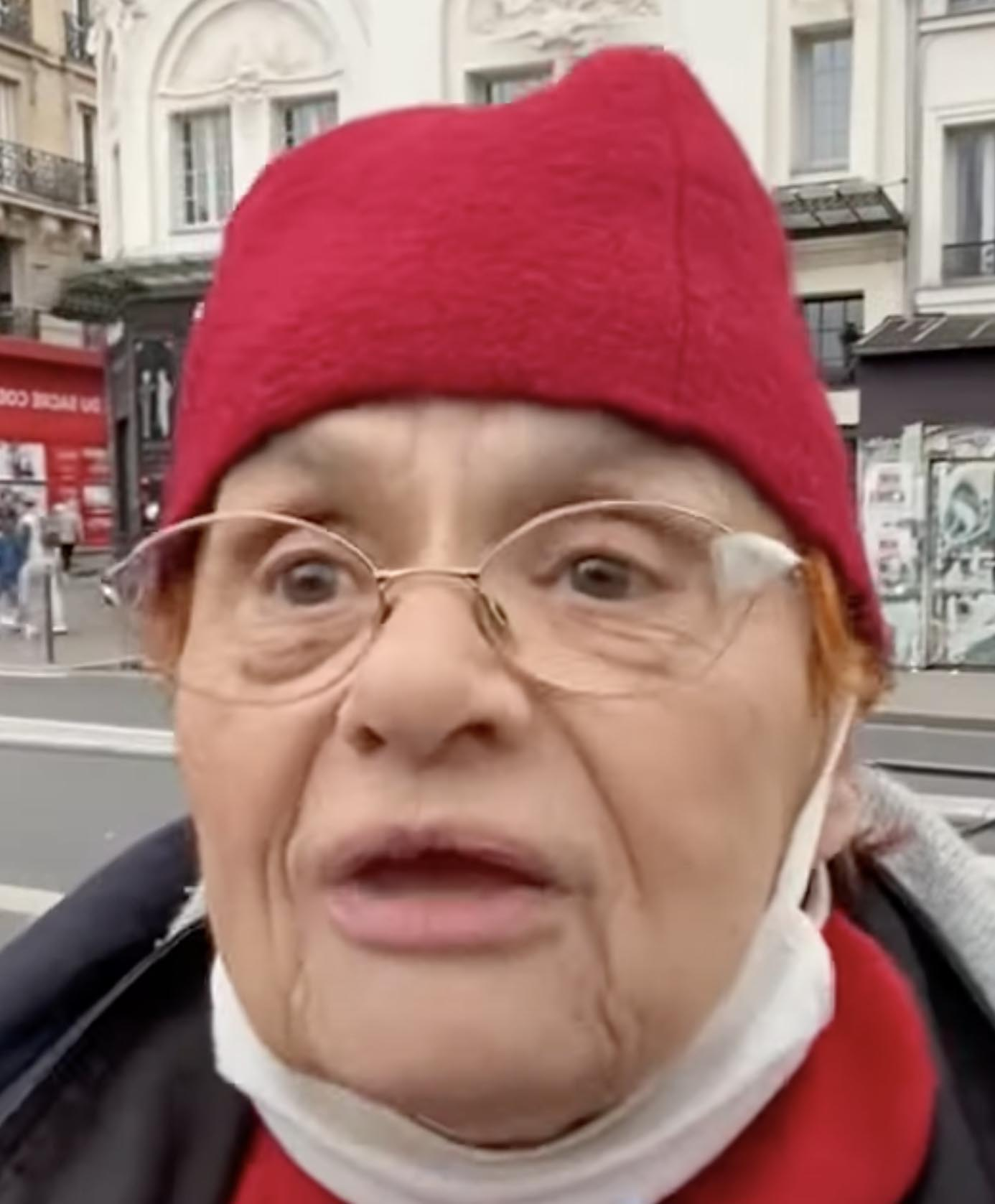
- Born: Maria Koleva; 2 October 1940; Sofia, Kingdom of Bulgaria
- Died: 9 May 2025 (aged 84); Paris, France
- Occupations: Writer, director, producer, cinematrographer
- Years active: 1973–2025

Maria Koleva (Bulgarian: Мария Колева; 2 October 1940 – 9 May 2025) was a Bulgarian writer and independent film-maker who lived and worked in France. Koleva was also known as a producer, film-editor and cinematographer.

== Life and career ==
Maria Koleva was born in Sofia, in the then Kingdom of Bulgaria, and studied chemical engineering in the United States and Germany before emigrating to France in 1971. There she studied cinema in Vincennes and began work as a film-maker. Her 1982 four-hour film-book L'état de bonheur... permanent won the Grand Prize at the Belfort Festival and is recognized as representative of the political-shown-through-the-personal film-making style of the period. Her 1974 film La fête aujourd'hui, la fête demain featured the English rock band The Who performing in Paris in 1972. She also made five films on Antoine Vitez featuring the French director conducting workshop sessions.

In 1989, Koleva conducted a 45-day hunger strike to bring attention to the fact that independent film-makers were unable to obtain distribution on French TV. After 1990, Koleva worked more in video and digital format than in film.

Koleva died on 9 May 2025, at the age of 84.

== Films ==
Selected films include:

- Le fétichisme dans "le Capital" de Karl Marx et le capital (2011)
- Marxisme et philosophie du langage (2011)
- Heidegger face à Lukacs, quelle ontologie? (2011)
- Jean-Paul Lambert sur l'abolition du profit monétaire et de la monnaie (2010)
- Michel, objecteur de croissance, cherche du travail et fait l'éloge de la démotivation à Notre-Dame-des-Landes (2009)
- Toute la vérité sur la guerre d'Espagne, soirée Retirada avec 3 générations de républicains (2009)
- Saga électorale dans le XI e arrondissement de Paris au marché de la Bastille, pour les élections municipales (2008)
- La Batailleuse, ferme pédagogique pour petits et grands (2008)
- Christian Sunt présente doctement le mouvement politique des objecteurs de croissance (2008)
- Pour une autre approche cinématographique (2007)
- Les Bogomiles ou les aimés de Dieu, comme disaient les gens – les cathares, 3 parts (2007)
- L'Internationale des fonctionnaires, 2 parts (2006)
- Écrivains, artistes, soyez les kamikazes de la culture (video documentary short) (2002)
- Le cinéma 'Le Denfert' donne carte blanche à Raphaël Bassan (video documentary short) (2002)
- Isabelle et les 27 voleurs (1993)
- John, le dernier ouvrier sur terre, l'an 2024 (1991)
- Paroles tues ou Aimer en étrangère à Paris (1991)
- Lettre à l'ami suisse No 7 (1986)
- Le voiture (1983)
- Fragments pour un discours thèâtral: Vitez, le conservatoire (1983)
- L'état de bonheur... permanent (documentary) (1982)
- Le barbouillé ou la mort gaie (1978)
- Cinq leçons de thèâtre d'Antoine Vitez (1978)
- Antoine Vitez s'amuse avec Claudel et Brecht (1976)
- La fête aujourd'hui, la fête demain (political documentary) (1974)
- L'Enfant aux yeux morts (short) (1974)
- Chères amies on cosmetics ("le commerce de la beauté")
