= National Movement for the Salvation of the Fatherland =

National Movement for the Salvation of the Fatherland Национално движение за спасение на Отечеството
- Leader: Todor Rashev
- Founded: 18 June 2003
- Headquarters: Sofia
- Ideology: Nationalism
- National affiliation: Patriotic Front
- National Assembly: 0 / 240
- European Parliament: 0 / 17

The National Movement for the Salvation of the Fatherland (Nacionalno Dviženie za Spasenie na Otecestvoto) is a nationalist political party in Bulgaria.

== History ==
It was officially registered on 18 June 2003, chaired by Elijah Kirov. In the parliamentary elections in 2005 the party was part of the list of National Union Attack, which received 8.14% of the vote and won 21 seats. On 7 June 2009 the new party president Todor Rashev submitted an application to participate in the parliamentary elections, which was supported by the signatures of 17,130 voters. In the parliamentary elections held in 2009 the party received 0.04% of the vote and failed to win a seat.
