= Magdalena Tasheva =

Bulgarian journalist and politician (1953–2025)

- Магдалена Ташева

Personal details
- Born: 1 March 1953 Gorna Oryahovitsa, Bulgaria
- Died: 19 October 2025 (aged 72)
- Profession: Politician, journalist

Magdalena Lambova Tasheva (Bulgarian: Магдалена Ламбова Ташева; 1 March 1953 – 19 October 2025) was a Bulgarian journalist and politician who was a member of the Attack political party. She was presenter and host of the "В окото на бурята" ("In the eye of the storm") segment on Alpha TV.

== Life and career ==
Tasheva graduated from Sofia University with a degree in nuclear physics.

She spoke English, French and Russian in addition to her native Bulgarian.

Tasheva died after a short illness on 19 October 2025, at the age of 72.
