= United Patriots =

Bulgarian political alliance

United Patriots Обединени Патриоти
- Abbreviation: OP
- Spokesperson: Krasimir Karakachanov; Valeri Simeonov
- Founded: 28 July 2016
- Dissolved: 5 February 2021
- Preceded by: Patriotic Front
- Succeeded by: Patriotic Coalition Volya–NFSB; Bulgarian Patriots
- Headquarters: Sofia
- Ideology: Bulgarian nationalism National conservatism Social conservatism Right-wing populism Protectionism; Soft Euroscepticism; Anti-communism
- Political position: Right-wing to far-right
- Religion: Bulgarian Orthodox Church
- European Parliament group: European Conservatives and Reformists
- Member parties: VMRO; NFSB; Attack (until 25 July 2019)
- Colours: White, Green, Red (Bulgarian national colours)

Website
- obedinenipatrioti.com

The United Patriots (OP; Bulgarian: Обединени Патриоти; ОП, romanized: Obedineni Patrioti; OP) was a nationalist electoral alliance in Bulgaria formed by three political parties: VMRO, Attack (until 25 July 2019), and the National Front for the Salvation of Bulgaria (NFSB).

The coalition between the three parties was created by the agreement put forward a joint candidacy for the 2016 presidential election. The coalition's candidates for president and vice president were the then Deputy Chairmen of the National Assembly Krasimir Karakachanov (for President) and Yavor Notev (for Vice President).

On July 25, 2019, Volen Siderov, Desislav Chukolov and Pavel Shopov were expelled from the parliamentary group.

The coalition was part of the Third Borisov Government. All parties in the coalition were defeated in the 2021 Bulgarian parliamentary election and failed to gain any seats in the National Assembly.

== Electoral history ==
Karakachanov for President
Election	# of total votes (1st round)	% of popular vote (1st round)	rank (1st round)	# of total votes (2nd round)	% of popular vote (2nd round)	rank (2nd round)
2016	573,016	14.97	3rd	-	-	-

Bulgarian Parliament
Election	# of seats won	# of total votes	% of popular vote	rank	Government
2017	27 / 240	318,513	9.07	3rd	GERB-OP

== See also ==
- Patriotic Front (Bulgaria) Nationalist electoral alliance (2016–2017)
