= Union of Patriotic Forces and Militaries of the Reserve Defense =

Union of Patriotic Forces "Defense" Съюз на патриотичните сили "Защита"
- Leader: Peter Beron
- Founded: 1998
- Headquarters: Sofia, Bulgaria
- Ideology: Nationalism
- Political position: Right-wing
- National affiliation: Bulgarian Patriots

Website
- zashtita.info

The Union of Patriotic Forces and Militaries of the Reserve Zashtita (Sajuz na Patrioticnite Sili i Voinite ot Zapaca Zaštita, abbreviated as SPSZ) is a nationalist political party in Bulgaria founded in December 1998. Since 2021, SPSZ was part of Bulgarian Patriots nationalist electoral alliance.
