= Veselin Mareshki =

Bulgarian businessman and politician

Veselin Naydenov Mareshki

Personal details
- Born: 26 March 1967 (age 59) Varna, Bulgaria
- Party: Volya (2016–present); Independent (2007–2016); Order, Law and Justice (2005–2007)
- Profession: Politician, businessman

Veselin Naydenov Mareshki (Bulgarian: Веселин Найденов Марешки; born 26 March 1967) is a Bulgarian businessman and politician. He is the founder and leader of political party Volya.

== Background and education ==
Veselin Mareshki was born on 26 March 1967, in Varna. He completed his education at the School of Mathematics "Dr. Petar Beron". His university engineering education began by studying in the Russian capital Moscow, where he studied for three years, after which he returned to Bulgaria to graduate from the Technical University – Varna.

== Pharmaceutical business ==
Veselin Mareshki tied his first links in the pharmaceutical industry in the USSR. Between 1991 and 1992 he managed to enter the then extremely underdeveloped drug market in Bulgaria.

By mid-2012 he was the owner of pharmacies in most major cities in Bulgaria. He has stakes in 46 companies with diverse activities. owns 2 companies for pharmaceuticals and cosmetics – "Liafarm" and " Pharma Holding Varna ". Personally and through "Varna Pharma Holding" owns 100% of Medical Center "Mladost". Through his sister Mareshki owns 98% in the third pharmaceutical company – "UNICOMS pharma" operated by Dilber Vaysalova. The company "Pharma Holding Varna" has over 70 pharmacies in Varna. Through her businessman owns "Digital" dealing with construction and design. He owns the "Yunisoft Solutions" Ltd. and "Thrace-TD". Claims that his fortune is estimated at about 500 million leva.

By "Pharma Holding Varna" in February 2010 Veselin Mareshki acquire BTC building in the seaside capital along with two buildings totaling 16 million leva.

== Oil business ==
In 2015, he enters the business stations, under the pretext of building a gas station to supply its own fleet. The company, in which Mareshki developed its first gas station in Varna, is "Treydnet Varna" Ltd, registered at the end of 2010. The station is forcing major stations to cut fuel prices by nearly 0.20 lev.

== Political career ==
In 2005, he founded National Movement for Freedom and Democracy (NDSD). In 2007 Mareshki became councilor and then deputy chairman of the Municipal Council in Varna elected on the ticket of CSV. Soon after the election but left the party. In 2007 creates a political party Liberal Alliance. In 2012 makes a coalition with Law and Order Security (RZS) – RZS with Mareshki.

In November 2012, he nominated for constitutional judge Prof.. Dr. Valentina Popova a statement of him.

In 2011, Veselin Mareshki ran as an independent candidate for mayor of Varna. Be supported by VMRO-NIE, PD "Social Democrats", BSDP and Party Bulgarian Social Democracy – Euro-Left. On the first round of elections was second, receiving 18.58% of the vote goes to runoff with the candidate of GERB Kiril Yordanov the second round received 40.50% support (47,565 votes).

In 2016, he ran as an independent in the presidential election, finishing 4th with 11.17% of the popular vote.

In 2017, his political party Volya ran in the parliamentary election, finishing 5th with 4.15% of the popular vote.

In September 2020, he was sentenced to four years in jail for extortion and blackmail by the Bulgarian Court of Appeals of Varna. In response to the Court's ruling, Mareshki claimed he was innocent and seeks to challenge the court decision in the Supreme Court of Bulgaria.

== Political views ==
Veselin Mareshki's political views have elements of populism, as he "preaches patriotism, strict immigration controls, friendlier relations with Moscow and, above all, the need to "sweep away the garbage" of a corrupt political establishment."
