= Valeri Simeonov =

Bulgarian politician

- Валери Симеонов
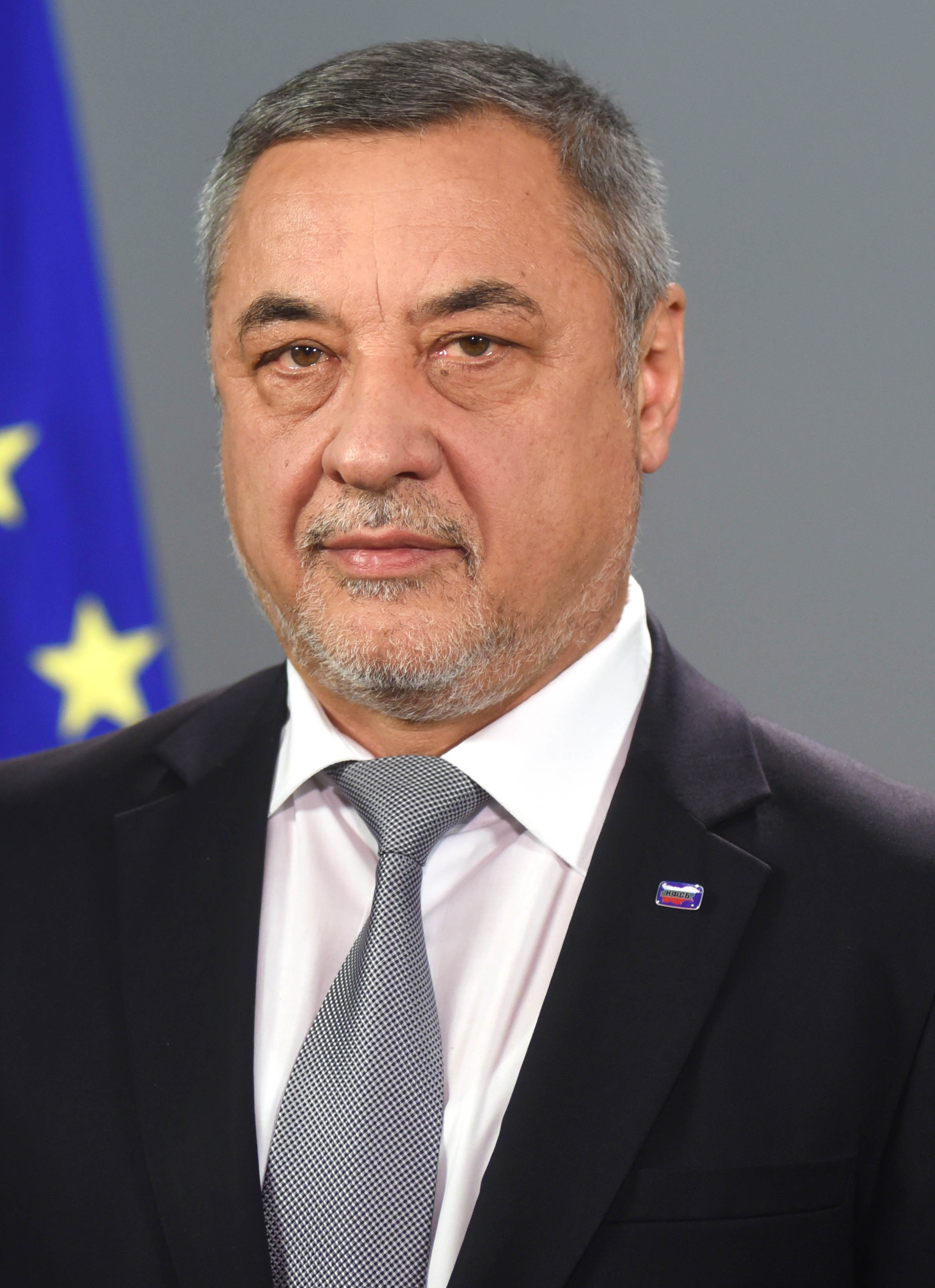

Deputy Prime Minister of Bulgaria
- In office 4 May 2017 – 16 November 2018
- Prime Minister: Boyko Borisov
- Preceded by: Stefan Yanev
- Succeeded by: Mariyana Nikolova

Personal details
- Born: 14 March 1955 (age 71) Dolni Chiflik, Bulgaria
- Party: NFSB (since 2011)
- Other political affiliations: United Patriots (2016–2021); Patriotic Front (2014–2017); Attack (2005–2009); Union of Democratic Forces (before 2000)
- Children: 2
- Parent: Simeon Balevski (father)
- Education: Technical University
- Occupation: Politician; Engineer

Valeri Simeonov Simeonov (Bulgarian: Валери Симеонов Симеонов; born 14 March 1955) is a Bulgarian politician who is one of the leaders and founding members of the National Front for the Salvation of Bulgaria.

== Biography ==
Born in Dolni Chiflik, Simeonov has a degree in electrical engineering from TU-Sofia.

In the 1990s he founded the SKAT cable network in the city of Burgas. As was customary for Bulgarian cable networks at the time, the SKAT company soon started its own TV channels. The cable TV network is currently one of the main competitors in Southwestern Bulgaria.

He was associated with the Attack party through his SKAT TV, but left the party and withdrew his support from Volen Siderov in November 2009.

In 2017 he was appointed head of the Bulgarian Council on Ethnic Minority Integration, which deals with the local Turkish and Romani minorities. He once referred to Roma as “feral humanoids.”

Simeonov served as the Deputy Prime Minister of Bulgaria in charge of economy and demographic policies as part of the Borisov cabinet until his resignation on 16 November 2018 following a public outcry and protests that resulted from a controversial statement he had made on 19 October 2018 regarding the mothers of children with disabilities.
