= Krasimir Karakachanov =

Bulgarian politician (born 1965)

- Красимир Каракачанов
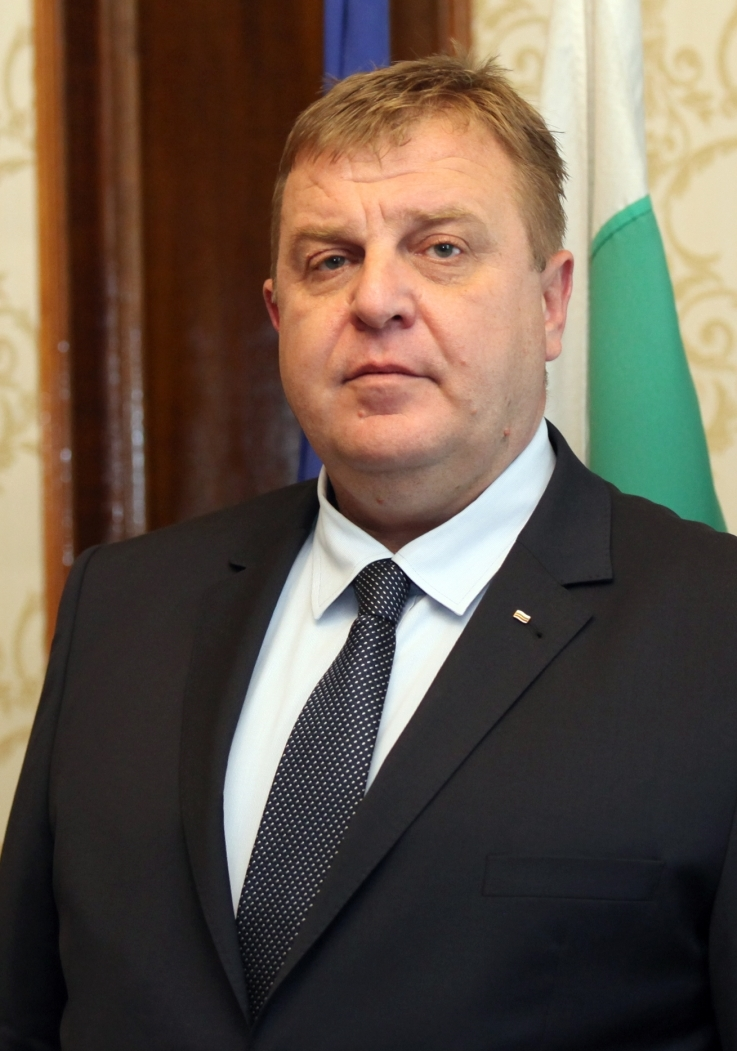
- Karakachanov in 2017

Deputy Prime Minister for national security
- In office 4 May 2017 – 12 May 2021
- Prime Minister: Boyko Borisov
- Preceded by: Stefan Yanev

Minister of Defence
- In office 4 May 2017 – 12 May 2021
- Prime Minister: Boyko Borisov
- Preceded by: Stefan Yanev
- Succeeded by: Georgi Panayotov

Personal details
- Born: 29 March 1965 (age 61) Ruse, Bulgaria
- Party: VMRO – Bulgarian National Movement
- Other political affiliations: Patriotic Front (2014–2017); United Patriots (2016–2021)
- Education: Sofia University "St. Kliment Ohridski", South-West University "Neofit Rilski"
- Profession: Historian, politician

Krasimir Donchev Karakachanov (Bulgarian: Красимир Дончев Каракачанов [krɐsiˈmir kɐˈrakɐt͡ʃanof]; born 29 March 1965) is a Bulgarian politician. He is the leader of the far-right political party VMRO-BND.

== Biography ==
Krasimir Karakachanov was born on 29 March 1965 in Ruse, Bulgaria. He graduated in history from Sofia University. As a historian, Karakachanov has published material about the Internal Macedonian Revolutionary Organisation (IMRO). During the communist period, Karakachanov provided information on Macedonian issues for State Security.

After the creation of VMRO-SMD at the end of 1990, he was elected as its secretary. From 1995 to 1997, he was its co-president, and then president. Karakachanov was a deputy in the 38th National Assembly from the coalition Union of Democratic Forces (UDS) after VMRO joined it. The coalition won a majority in parliament in April 1997. In 1999, he transformed VMRO into a political party and changed its name to VMRO‐BND. In 2001, the Sofia youth organisation of the party criticised Karakachanov during the party congress, arguing that the party had lost its direction and accused Karakachanov of using the party for personal gain. As a result, the youth organisation was disbanded. Under his leadership, the party became right-wing populist in the 2000s. In 2005, he became a deputy in the 40th National Assembly.

He centralised the party, with him and his followers deciding on the electoral lists for national and European Parliament elections. Karakachanov was a candidate in the 2011 Bulgarian presidential election, winning 1% of all votes, cast in 10th place. Karakachanov took part in the 2014 European Parliament election as part of a coalition bloc with the Bulgaria without Censorship political party. In late July 2014, Karakachanov's VMRO-BND left the coalition to form a Patriotic Front electoral alliance together with Valeri Simeonov's National Front for the Salvation of Bulgaria. In the same year, Karakachanov received a PhD in law from South-West University "Neofit Rilski" with a dissertation about IMRO. In the 2016 Bulgarian presidential election, he won 15% of the vote and was ranked third, on the basis of a platform promoting anti-immigration and rule of law. From 4 May 2017 to 21 May 2021, he was a deputy prime minister for national security and minister of defence in the government of Boyko Borisov. On 17 February 2024, Karakachanov was re-elected as the party's president by an extraordinary congress, overcoming an attempt by Angel Dzhambazki to take the leadership.

== Views ==
Karakachanov used "unsocialized Gypsies" to describe Romani people in Bulgaria, a term which critics said resembled Nazi terminology of "asocial Gypsies". During the 2020–2021 Bulgarian protests against the incumbent right-wing government, Karakachanov associated the protesters with LGBT rights activists, and said: "We cannot let a few Sorosoid NGOs and small parties, that are not even in the parliament, get in power and destroy the country. In the name of what? To introduce gay marriage and to create a gender republic." After the-then prime minister Boyko Borisov proposed the draft of a new constitution to appease the public, Karakachanov wrote: "I am certain that VMRO will defend its position on strengthening family values and marriage as a union between a man and a woman, as well as placing the family at the core of all normative documents related to the rights of children. The institution of marriage should be guaranteed and the protection against the introduction of a third, fifth, or a 30th gender should be explicit." About a proposed reintroduction of compulsory military service for man, Karakachanov wrote: "This is one of the ways we will get our children away from the dangerous influence of gender ideology." In response, the Sofia Pride Organisational Committee, Bilitis, Deystvie, and the GLAS Foundation called for condemnation of his statements.

Political offices
Preceded by Stefan Yanev	Minister of Defence of Bulgaria; 4 May 2017 – 12 May 2021	Succeeded by Georgi Panayotov
