= List of members of the European Parliament for Bulgaria (2007–2009) =

This is a list of the 18 members of the European Parliament for Bulgaria in the 2004 to 2009 session, replacing the members who were appointed by the Bulgarian Parliament.

== List ==
Name	National party	EP Group
Mariela Baeva	Movement for Rights and Freedoms	ALDE
Slavcho Binev	Attack	ITS
Desislav Chukolov	Attack	ITS
Filiz Husmenova	Movement for Rights and Freedoms	ALDE
Rumiana Jeleva	GERB	EPP–ED
Metin Kazak	Movement for Rights and Freedoms	ALDE
Evgeni Kirilov	Socialist Party	PES
Marusya Lyubcheva	Socialist Party	PES
Nickolay Mladenov	GERB	EPP–ED
Vladko Panayotov	Movement for Rights and Freedoms	ALDE
Atanas Paparizov	Socialist Party	PES
Biliana Raeva	National Movement Simeon II	ALDE
Petya Stavreva	United Agrarians (Note: Elected on the GERB list.)	EPP–ED
Dimitar Stoyanov	Attack	ITS
Vladimir Uruchev	GERB	EPP–ED
Kristian Vigenin	Socialist Party	PES
Iliana Yotova	Socialist Party	PES
Dushana Zdravkova	GERB	EPP–ED
