= List of members of the European Parliament for Bulgaria (2009–2014) =

This is a list of the 17 members of the European Parliament for Bulgaria in the 2009 to 2014 session. One person from Democrats for a Strong Bulgaria entered the Parliament in December 2011.

== List ==
| Name | National party | EP Group |
|---|---|---|
| Slavcho Binev | Attack | NI |
| Preslav Borissov | Citizens for European Development of Bulgaria | EPP |
| Mariya Gabriel | Citizens for European Development of Bulgaria | EPP |
| Filiz Husmenova | Movement for Rights and Freedoms | ALDE |
| Stanimir Ilchev | National Movement for Stability and Progress (National Movement Simeon II) | ALDE |
| Andrey Kovatchev | Citizens for European Development of Bulgaria | EPP |
| Ivaylo Kalfin | Coalition for Bulgaria (Socialist Party) | S&D |
| Metin Kazak | Movement for Rights and Freedoms | ALDE |
| Evgeni Kirilov | Coalition for Bulgaria (Socialist Party) | S&D |
| Svetoslav Malinov | Blue Coalition (Democrats for a Strong Bulgaria) | EPP |
| Nadezhda Mihailova | Blue Coalition (Union of Democratic Forces) | EPP |
| Vladko Panayotov | Movement for Rights and Freedoms | ALDE |
| Monika Panayotova | Citizens for European Development of Bulgaria | EPP |
| Antonia Parvanova | National Movement for Stability and Progress (National Movement Simeon II) | ALDE |
| Dimitar Stoyanov | Attack | NI |
| Vladimir Urutchev | Citizens for European Development of Bulgaria | EPP |
| Marusya Lyubcheva | Coalition for Bulgaria (Socialist Party) | S&D |
| Iliana Yotova | Coalition for Bulgaria (Socialist Party) | S&D |
