= List of female members of the European Parliament for Bulgaria =

This is a list of women who are or have been members of the European Parliament for Bulgaria.

== List ==
| Image | Name | National party | EP group | Elected | Year left | Ref. |
|---|---|---|---|---|---|---|
| | Mariela Baeva | Movement for Rights and Freedoms | ALDE | 2007 | 2009 | |
| | Filiz Hyusmenova | Movement for Rights and Freedoms | ALDE | 2007 | 2019 | |
| | Rumiana Jeleva | Citizens for European Development of Bulgaria | EPP | 2007 | 2009 | |
| | Marusya Ivanova Lyubcheva | Socialist Party | S&D | 2007 | 2014 | |
| | Bilyana Raeva | National Movement Simeon II | ALDE | 2007 | 2009 | |
| | Petya Stavreva | Citizens for European Development of Bulgaria | EPP | 2007 | 2009 | |
| | Iliana Iotova | Socialist Party | S&D | 2007 | 2017 | |
| | Dushana Zdravkova | Citizens for European Development of Bulgaria | EPP | 2007 | 2009 | |
| | Mariya Gabriel | Citizens for European Development of Bulgaria | EPP | 2009 | 2017 | |
| | Nadezhda Neynsky | Union of Democratic Forces | EPP | 2009 | 2014 | |
| | Monika Panayotova | Citizens for European Development of Bulgaria | EPP | 2012 | 2014 | |
| | Antonia Parvanova | National Movement Simeon II | ALDE | 2007 | 2014 | |
| | Eva Maydell | Citizens for European Development of Bulgaria | EPP | 2014 | Incumbent | |
| | Iskra Mihaylova | Movement for Rights and Freedoms | RE | 2014 | 2024 | |
| | Elena Yoncheva | Socialist Party (until 2024) Movement for Rights and Freedoms (from 2024) | S&D (until 2024) RE (2024) NI (from 2024) | 2019 | Incumbent | |
| | Tsvetelina Penkova | Socialist Party | S&D | 2019 | Incumbent | |
| | Atidzhe Alieva-Veli | Movement for Rights and Freedoms | RE | 2019 | 2024 | |
| | Rada Laykova | Revival | ESN | 2024 | Incumbent | |
