= 2007 European Parliament election in Bulgaria =

- 20 May 2007
- All 18 Bulgarian seats in the European Parliament
- Turnout: 29.22%
Party	Leader	Vote %	Seats
GERB	Dushana Zdravkova	21.68	5
KzB	Kristian Vigenin	21.41	5
DPS	Filiz Husmenova	20.26	4
Ataka	Dimitar Stoyanov	14.20	3
NDSV	Bilyana Raeva	6.27	1
This lists parties that won seats. See the complete results below.

European Parliament elections were held in Bulgaria on 20 May 2007. It was the country's first European election, having joined the Union on 1 January of that year. The country still had 18 MEPs, no change from before the election. Until Bulgaria could hold these elections, the country was represented by MEPs appointed by the National Assembly.

The top two parties – GERB and Bulgarian Socialist Party (BSP) – won 5 seats each, followed by the Movement for Rights and Freedoms (DPS) with four, Ataka with three, and National Movement Simeon II (NDSV) with one. Voter turnout was 28.6%.

It was considered likely that the result of the election would cause a major political crisis in Bulgaria, due to the expected weak results of the National Movement.

Controversially, the eligible voters were limited to citizens of Bulgaria and the EU with their permanent and current address within the Union and a minimum of 60 days of the last three months before the elections spent within its borders. Because of this requirement, 232,800 people were rendered ineligible to vote, 185,000 of whom were Turkish Bulgarians resident in Turkey.

== Contesting parties ==
The following parties contested the elections:

- Coalition of the Bulgarian Agrarian People's Union
- Communist Party of Bulgaria
- Coalition of Bulgarian Social Democrats (Party of Bulgarian Social Democrats, Political Movement "Social Democrats")
- GERB
- Civil Union for New Bulgaria
- Democrats for a Strong Bulgaria
- European Socialists Platform (Bulgarian Socialist Party, Movement for Social Humanism)
- Green Party of Bulgaria
- Movement for Rights and Freedoms
- National Movement Simeon II
- Attack
- Order, Law and Justice
- Union of the Democratic Forces
- Union of Free Democrats
- two independents

The People's First Movement had registered to contest the election, but were refused by the Central Electoral Commission.

The five Bulgarian nurses sentenced to death and the Bulgarian doctor who received a lighter sentence in the HIV trial in Libya were slated to stand as the six leading candidates on the list of the populist Order, Law and Justice Party – to put pressure on Libya to release the nurses and to postpone their execution because of the immunity they would have as MEPs. They were refused by the Central Electoral Commission, however, as they did not meet the residency requirements.

== Pre-election situation ==
18 MEPs were appointed by Bulgaria to serve as observers in the Parliament before the country joined on 1 January 2007. Those observers then functioned as Bulgaria's appointed delegation to the European Parliament until elections were held on 20 May 2007. The breakdown of parties and their European Parliament political groups for the period 1 January 2007 to 20 May 2007 was as follows:

Party	Group	Seats
Bulgarian Socialist Party	PES	6
National Movement Simeon II	ALDE	4
Movement for Rights and Freedoms	ALDE	3
Union of Democratic Forces	EPP-ED	2
Democrats for a Strong Bulgaria	EPP-ED	1
Bulgarian People's Union	EPP-ED	1
Attack	ITS	1

== Results ==
The official results were announced by the Central Electoral Commission on 21 May. According to the official data, the winner of the elections was GERB, followed by a small margin by the Bulgarian Socialist Party and the Movement for Rights and Freedoms, with the distance between the third and the first being less than 1.5%. The voter turnout was 28.6%.

Party	Votes	%	Seats
GERB	420,001	21.68	5
Coalition for Bulgaria	414,786	21.41	5
Movement for Rights and Freedoms	392,650	20.26	4
Attack	275,237	14.20	3
National Movement Simeon II	121,398	6.27	1
Union of Democratic Forces	91,871	4.74	0
Democrats for a Strong Bulgaria	84,350	4.35	0
Coalition of Bulgarian Social Democrats (PBSD–PDS)	37,645	1.94	0
Agrarian People's Union	29,752	1.54	0
Communist Party	18,988	0.98	0
Union of Free Democrats	14,392	0.74	0
Green Party	9,976	0.51	0
Civil Union for New Bulgaria	9,398	0.49	0
Order, Law and Justice	9,147	0.47	0
Mariya Stoyanova Serkedzhieva (Independent)	5,323	0.27	0
Nikola Petkov Ivanov (Independent)	2,782	0.14	0
Total	1,937,696	100.00	18
Valid votes	1,937,696	99.09	
Invalid/blank votes	17,750	0.91	
Total votes	1,955,446	100.00	
Registered voters/turnout	6,691,080	29.22	
Source: Izbori2007

=== Elected MEPs ===
According to the election results, the following 18 candidates were elected as Bulgarian Members of the European Parliament:

- GERB (5)
  - Dushana Zdravkova
  - Vladimir Uruchev
  - Nickolay Mladenov
  - Petya Stavreva
  - Rumiana Jeleva
- Bulgarian Socialist Party (5)
  - Kristian Vigenin
  - Iliana Iotova
  - Atanas Paparizov
  - Marusya Lyubcheva
  - Evgeni Kirilov
- Movement for Rights and Freedoms (4)
  - Filiz Husmenova
  - Mariela Baeva
  - Metin Kazak
  - Vladko Panayotov
- Attack (3)
  - Dimitar Stoyanov
  - Slavcho Binev
  - Desislav Chukolov
- National Movement Simeon II (1)
  - Bilyana Raeva

== See also ==
- Elections in Bulgaria
- Elections in the European Union
- 2007 European Parliament election
- 2007 European Parliament election in Romania
- Bulgaria (European Parliament constituency)
