= List of members of the European Parliament for Bulgaria (2014–2019) =

This is the list of the 17 members of the European Parliament for Bulgaria in the 2014 to 2019 session. The members were elected in the 2014 European Parliament election in Bulgaria.

== List ==
Name	National party	EP Group	Preference votes
Tomislav Donchev (until November 6, 2014); Andrey Novakov (since 24 November 2014)	Citizens for European Development of Bulgaria (GERB)	EPP	108 340; 2 881
Andrey Kovatchev	Citizens for European Development of Bulgaria (GERB)	EPP	7 625
Maria Gabriel (until July 6, 2017); Asim Ademov (since 14 September 2017)	Citizens for European Development of Bulgaria (GERB)	EPP	9 874; 3 570
Vladimir Urutchev	Citizens for European Development of Bulgaria (GERB)	EPP	3 608
Eva Maydell	Citizens for European Development of Bulgaria (GERB)	EPP	2 796
Emil Radev	Citizens for European Development of Bulgaria (GERB)	EPP	3 275
Momchil Nekov	Bulgarian Socialist Party (BSP)	S&D	34 124
Sergei Stanishev	Bulgarian Socialist Party (BSP)	S&D	28 039
Iliana Yotova (until January 16, 2017); Petar Kurumbashev (since January 17, 2017)	Bulgarian Socialist Party (BSP)	S&D	12 452; 8 892
Georgi Pirinski	Bulgarian Socialist Party (BSP)	S&D	12 692
Filiz Husmenova	Movement for Rights and Freedoms (DPS)	ALDE	11 753
Nedzhmi Ali	Movement for Rights and Freedoms (DPS)	ALDE	3 203
Ilhan Kyuchyuk	Movement for Rights and Freedoms (DPS)	ALDE	2 873
Iskra Mihaylova	Movement for Rights and Freedoms (DPS)	ALDE	2 613
Nikolay Barekov	Bulgaria Without Censorship (BBT)	ERC	26 141
Angel Dzhambazki	IMRO – Bulgarian National Movement (IMRO-BND)	ERC	20 469
Svetoslav Malinov	Reformist Bloc - Democrats for a Strong Bulgaria (DSB)	EPP	39 173

Source: "Резултати от избори за Европейски парламент 25.05.2014 г. за страната". results.cik.bg. Central Election Commission.
