= 2009 European Parliament election in Bulgaria =

European Parliament election

- 7 June 2009

18 seats to the European Parliament
- Turnout: ▲37.5%
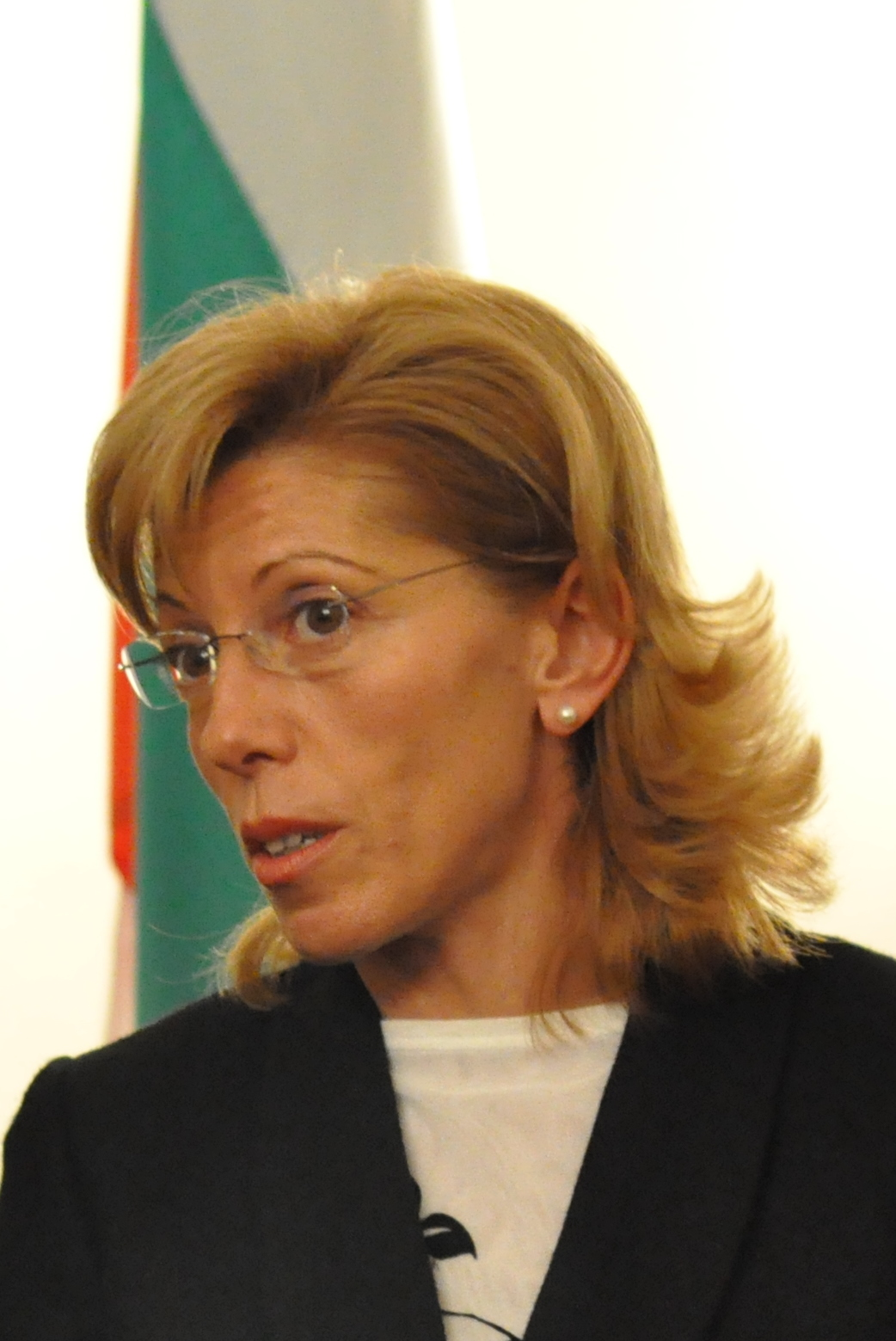

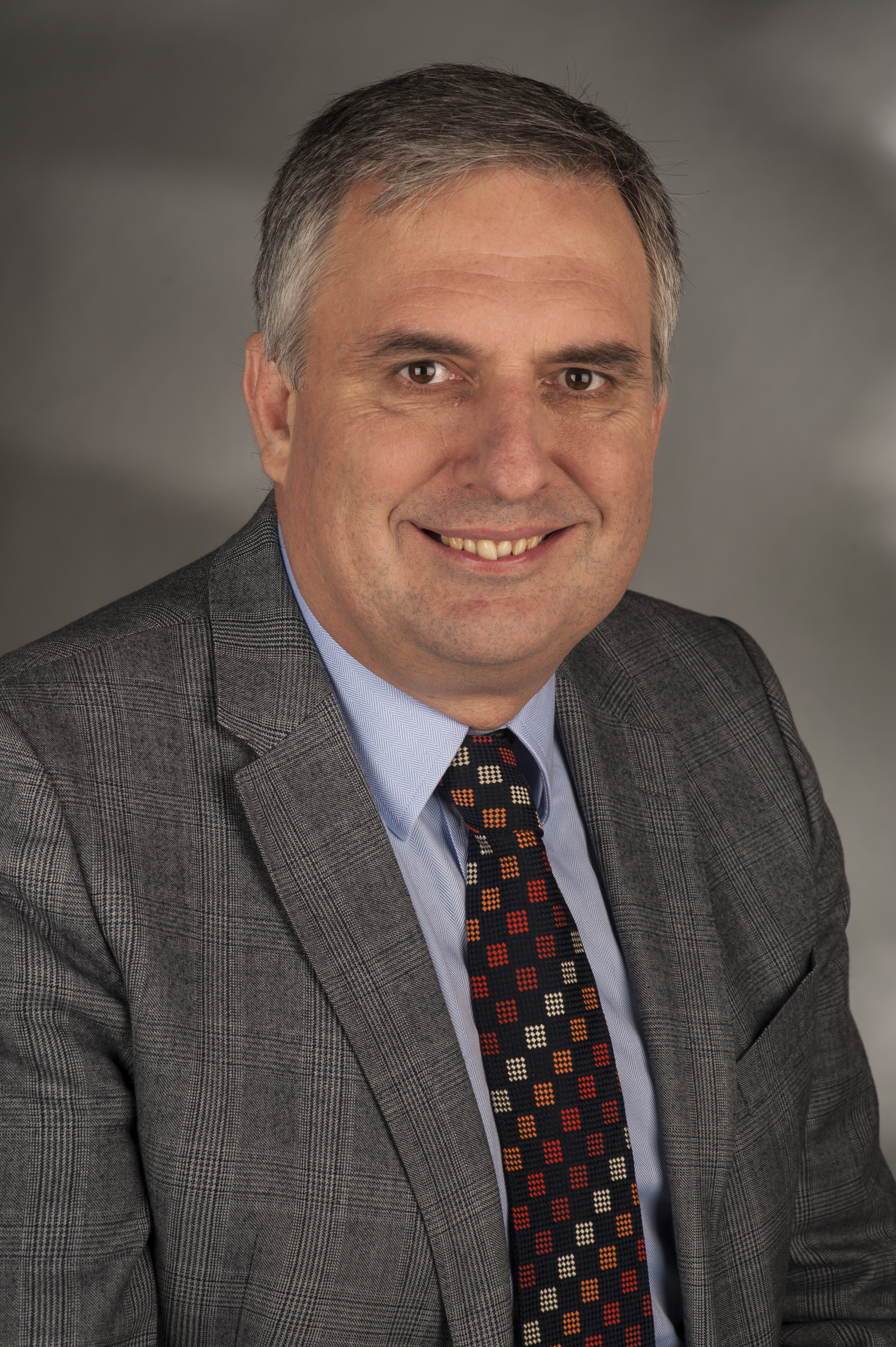

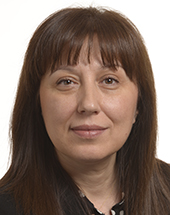

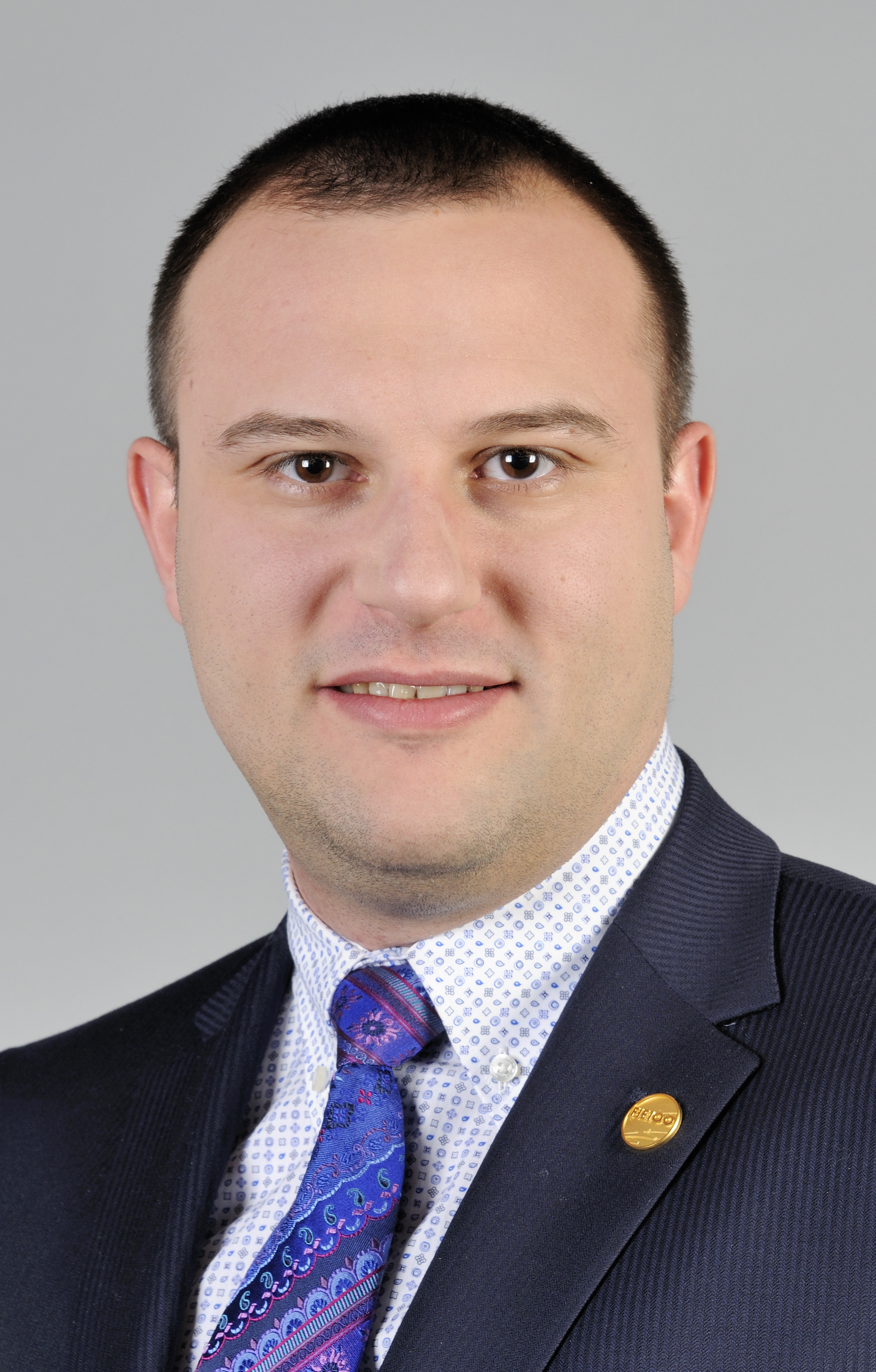

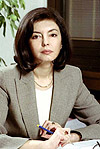

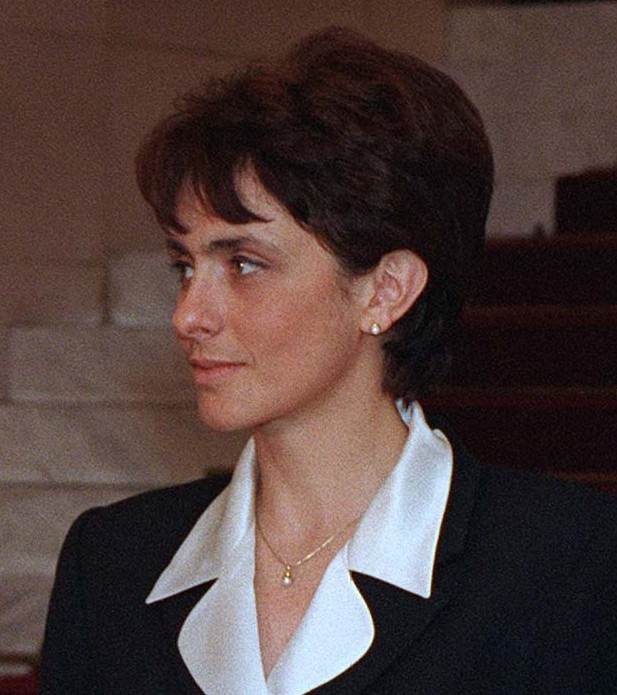
	First party	Second party	Third party
Leader	Rumiana Jeleva	Ivaylo Kalfin	Filiz Hyusmenova
Party	GERB	BSP	DPS
Alliance	EPP	S&D	ALDE
Last election	5 seats, 21.68%	5 seats, 21.41%	4 seats, 20.26%
Seats won	5	4	3
Seat change	Steady	▼1	▼1
Popular vote	627,693	476,618	364,197
Percentage	24.36%	18.50%	14.14%
Swing	▲2.68	▼2.91	▼6.12
	Fourth party	Fifth party	Sixth party
Leader	Dimitar Stoyanov	Meglena Kuneva	Nadezhda Mihaylova
Party	Ataka	NDSV	Blue Coalition
Alliance	NI	ALDE	EPP
Last election	3 seats, 14.20%	1 seat, 6,27%	0 seats, 9,09% (Note: This is the combined result of the SDS and the DSB which hadn’t yet unified prior to the previous election, therefore failing to win a seat.)
Seats won	2	2	2
Seat change	▼1	▲1	▲2
Popular vote	308,052	205,146	204,817
Percentage	11.96%	7.96%	7.95%
Swing	▼2.24	▲1.69	▼1.14

The election of the delegation from Bulgaria to the European Parliament was held on Sunday, 7 June 2009. As a result of the Treaty of Nice – that became active in November 2004 – the number of Bulgarian delegates in the European Parliament decreased from 18 (in 2007) to 17 delegates. When the Treaty of Lisbon was ratified, the number of Bulgarian Delegates increased to 18 again, giving a second seat to the Blue Coalition.

== Background ==
This election is the first one, in which Bulgaria elects MEP for the full five-year term. Most political analysts viewed these elections as a rehearsal to the 2009 Bulgarian parliamentary election.

== Opinion polls ==
Source	Date	GERB	BSP	DPS	Attack	Blue Coalition	Others
Alpha Research	March	19.2%	14.1%	6.0%	6.8%	4.9%	–
Alpha Research	April	24%	18%	15%	8%	7%	–
NCIOM	19 May	32.4%	26.8%	12.1%	11%	6.2%	6.8%
Skala	28 May	31.99%	20.89%	13.61%	9.70%	10.21%	13.1%
MBMD	31 May	30.00%	25.00%	19.00%	8.10%	6.07%	7.1%
Skala	1 June	30.30%	21.42%	15.03%	9.77%	8.94%	14.54%
Skala	2 June	31.15%	20.87%	15.18%	9.46%	8.80%	14.54%
Barometar Info	3 June	26.07%	17.54%	15.00%	8.53%	9.24%	18.95%
Skala	4 June	29.50%	20.95%	16.55%	10.30%	8.22%	14.48%

== Results ==
Party	Votes	%	Seats	+/–
GERB	627,693	24.36	5	0
Coalition for Bulgaria	476,618	18.50	4	–1
Movement for Rights and Freedoms	364,197	14.14	3	–1
Attack	308,052	11.96	2	–1
National Movement for Stability and Progress	205,146	7.96	2	+1
Blue Coalition	204,817	7.95	1	+1 (Note: 2 seats, following the Treaty of Lisbon)
Liberal Initiative for Democratic European Development	146,984	5.70	0	New
Order, Law and Justice	120,280	4.67	0	0
Forwards (IMRO-BND–ZNS–Gergyovden–ENP)	57,931	2.25	0	New
The Greens	18,444	0.72	0	New
Bulgarian Social Democracy	14,132	0.55	0	New
Union of Patriotic Forces "Defence"	11,904	0.46	0	New
Bulgarian New Democracy	11,679	0.45	0	New
Independents	8,565	0.33	0	0
Total	2,576,442	100.00	17	–1
Valid votes	2,576,442	99.03		
Invalid/blank votes	25,245	0.97		
Total votes	2,601,687	100.00		
Registered voters/turnout	6,684,770	38.92		
Source: CIK

== Elected MEPs ==
The following 18 MEP were elected:

5 MEPs from GERB that joined the European People's Party group:

1. Rumiana Jeleva
2. Vladimir Urutchev
3. Iliana Ivanova
4. Emil Stoyanov
5. Maria Nedeltcheva

4 MEPs from the Coalition for Bulgaria that joined the Progressive Alliance of Socialists and Democrats:

1. Ivaylo Kalfin
2. Iliana Yotova
3. Kristian Vigenin
4. Evgeni Kirilov

3 MEPs from Movement for Rights and Freedoms that joined the Alliance of Liberals and Democrats for Europe group:

1. Filiz Husmenova
2. Vladko Panayotov
3. Metin Kazak

2 MEPs from Attack that sat as Non-inscrits:

1. Dimitar Stoyanov
2. Slavcho Binev

2 MEPs from National Movement for Stability and Progress that joined the Alliance of Liberals and Democrats for Europe group:

1. Meglena Kuneva
2. Antonia Parvanova

1 MEP from Union of Democratic Forces that joined the European People's Party group:

1. Nadezhda Mihaylova

1 MEP from Democrats for a Strong Bulgaria that joined the European People's Party group:

1. Svetoslav Malinov

It was speculated that if similar results were obtained on the latter elections, that the formation of government would be extremely difficult. This did not turn out to be the case.

== See also ==
- 2007 European Parliament election in Bulgaria
- 2014 European Parliament election in Bulgaria
- 2009 European Parliament election
- European Parliament elections, Bulgaria
