= Alfa TV =

Alfa TV may refer to:

- Alfa TV (Cypriot TV channel)
- Alfa TV (Bulgarian TV channel)
- Alfa TV (North Macedonia)
- Alfa TVP, a Polish television channel
