= Ilhan Kyuchyuk =

Bulgarian politician (born 1985)

- Илхан Кючюк
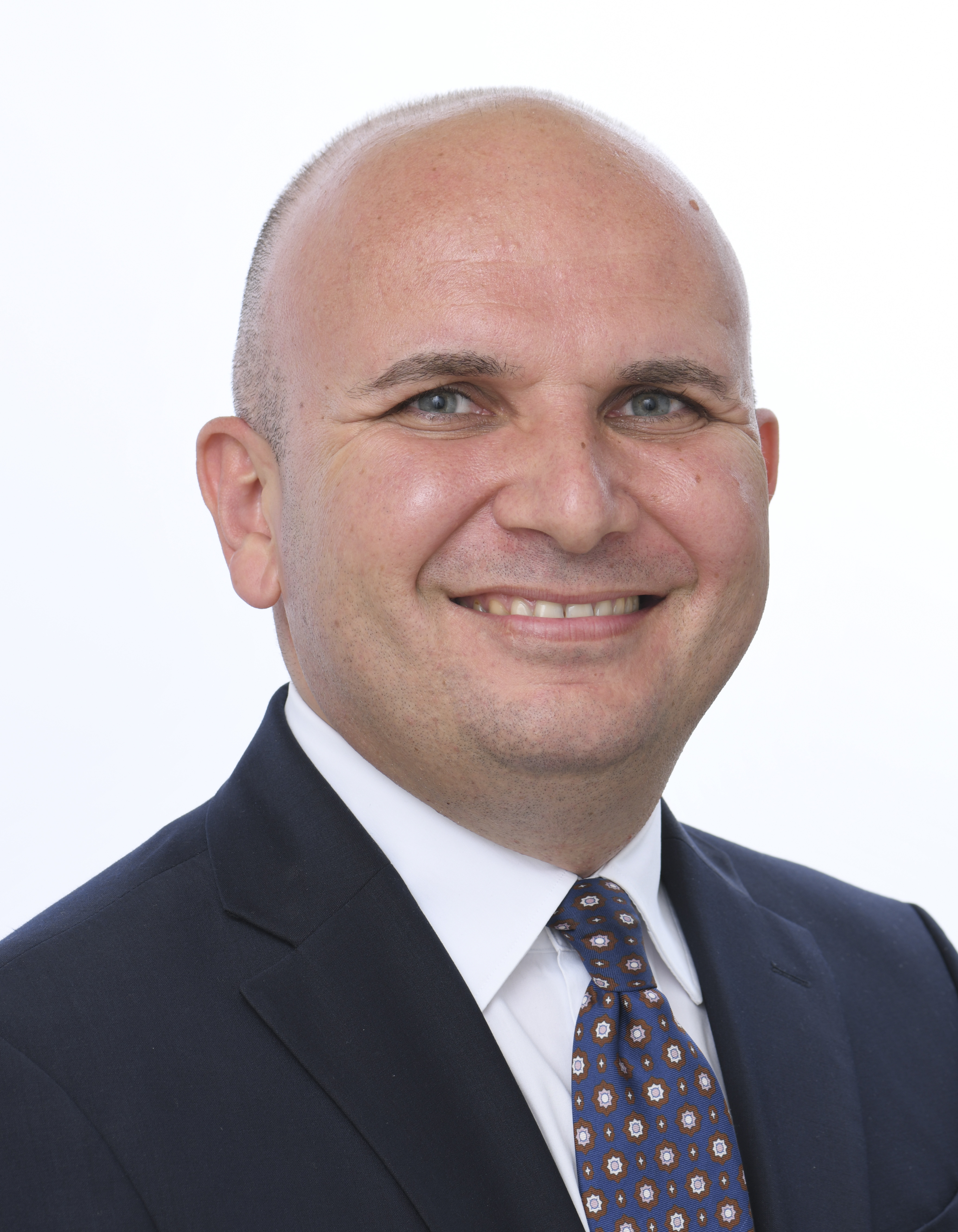
- Kyuchuk in 2020

Chair of the Legal Affairs Committee
- Incumbent
- Assumed office 23 July 2024
- Preceded by: Adrián Vázquez Lázara

President of the Alliance of Liberals and Democrats for Europe Party
- In office 11 June 2021 – 6 October 2024 Serving with Timmy Dooley
- Preceded by: Hans van Baalen

Member of the European Parliament for Bulgaria
- Incumbent
- Assumed office 1 July 2014
- Preceded by: Metin Kazak

Personal details
- Born: Ilhan Ahmet Kyuchyuk; 16 September 1985 (age 41) Sevlievo, PR Bulgaria
- Party: Bulgaria: DPS (European Union) EU: Renew
- Children: 1
- Education: Veliko Tarnovo University
- Occupation: Politician

Ilhan Ahmet Kyuchyuk (Bulgarian: Илхан Ахмет Кючюк, Turkish: İlhan Küçük; born 16 September 1985) is a Bulgarian politician who is currently a Member of the European Parliament. A member of the DPS party, he is also serving as Co-President of the ALDE party. In the European Parliament, Kyuchyuk currently chairs the Legal Affairs Committee. In July 2024, Ilhan Kyuchyuk was elected Chair of the Legal Affairs Committee of the European Parliament.

== Biography, education and early years ==
Kyuchyuk was born on 16 September 1985 in Sevlievo, Bulgaria. His mother is a nurse and his father works as an electrician. Kyuchyuk completed his secondary education in Sevlievo. He holds a bachelor's degree in political science and management from the ‘St. Cyril and St. Methodius’ University of Veliko Turnovo (2004-2008) and a master's degree in law from the same university (2005-2010). During the years, he has had the opportunity to participate in various trainings and specializations such as public policies academy (Prague, Czech Republic), International Academy for Leadership (Gummersbach, Germany), US State Department program on European economic, social and political issues, Rossotrudnichestvo program on Foreign Affairs (Moscow, Russia). In 2012, he graduated from the Bulgarian School of Politics ‘Dimitar Panitza’ and participated in the World Forum for Democracy in Strasbourg, France. In 2014 Mr. Kyuchyuk specialized in École nationale d'administration in France (ENA).

== Personal life ==
Kyuchyuk is married and has one child.

== Professional and political career ==
Kyuchyuk has been a member of the Youth MRF since 2005, and over the years was involved in various activities within the organization. From 2009 to 2012 he served as member of the Central Operational Council of the Youth MRF with a portfolio of Internal Policy, Media Policy and PR. At the VIth National Conference, held in November 2012, he was elected chairman of the Youth MRF, and in April 2016, during the VIIth National Conference, was re-elected chairman of the organization. Kyuchyuk was chairman of the Youth MRF in the period 2012-2020. In 2010 he became a Member of the Executive Council of the National Youth Forum Bulgaria, and in 2011 he was elected its Deputy Chairman. In 2014, Kyuchyuk was elected Member of the European Parliament in the parliamentary group of the Alliance of Liberals and Democrats for Europe (ALDE). In the elections held on 26 May 2019, he was elected for a new five-year term as a Member of the European Parliament from the Movement for Rights and Freedoms list. He is a member of the Committee on Foreign Affairs (AFET), a Substitute Member of the Committee on Transport and Tourism (TRAN), and the Committee on Legal Affairs (JURI). Ilhan Kyuchyuk is the first vice chair of the Delegation to the EU-Turkey Joint Parliamentary Committee and Substitute Member of the Delegation for relations with the Arab Peninsula.

From November 2014 until November 2017, he was a Member of the Liberal International Human Rights Committee. In December 2017, Kyuchyuk was elected vice president of the ALDE party, and in October 2019 he was re-elected with the highest score among all candidates. On 11 June 2021, Kyuchyuk was elected co-president of the ALDE Party. He was appointed a member of the EP delegation to the Conference on the Future of Europe, responsible for the "EU in the World" priority topic.

Kyuchyuk is the Permanent Rapporteur on the European Parliament reports on North Macedonia, Uzbekistan, Andorra, Monaco and San Marino.

In 2021, Kyuchyuk was sanctioned by China for his criticism of human rights abuses against Uyghurs in Xinjiang. The sanctions were lifted by China in April 2025 following negotiations with European Parliament President Roberta Metsola.

== Awards and distinctions ==
In October 2017, Kyuchyuk was awarded the honorary sign of the municipality of Sevlievo for his active public activity among young people in the municipality. In March 2018 he received the ‘MEP of the Year’ award in the ‘Culture and Media’ category. In July 2019, MEP Ilhan Kyuchyuk was awarded the Order of Honour of the National Assembly of the Republic of Azerbaijan (Milli Mejlis), and in November 2019 he was awarded the Order of Honour of the Ministry of Foreign Affairs of the Republic of Azerbaijan (Centenary Medal). Kyuchyuk received the awards for his active work in the promotion and development of bilateral relations between the Republic of Azerbaijan and the Republic of Bulgaria. In January 2020 he was awarded by the Council of Moroccans around the world for the promotion of Moroccan culture in Bulgaria and the promotion of bilateral relations between the European Union and the Kingdom of Morocco.

In September 2022, Ilhan Kyuchyuk was awarded the honorary title "Doctor Honoris Causa" by the American University in Europe-FON. The honorary title was awarded for his special contribution to the development of scientific and educational cooperation, as well as for the convergence and promotion of European values and culture in higher education.

In November 2022, Ilhan Kyuchyuk was awarded with the Flame of Freedom Award in Bucharest, Romania.

In January 2023, Ilhan Kyuchyuk receives the award "Progressive leader of the year" from Darik Radio. The award is presented to a person whom the media team considers to be an opinion leader in Bulgarian society.

In April 2023, Ilhan Kyuchyuk was awarded the honorary title "Doctor Honoris Causa" by The University of Telecommunications and Post (UTP). The honorary title is awarded for his special contribution to the development of educational cooperation and the affirmation of European values in higher education.

In November 2023, Ilhan Kyuchyuk was awarded the honorary title „Doctor Honoris Causa“ by the University of World Economy and Diplomacy in Tashkent, Uzbekistan.

In December 2023, Ilhan Kyuchyuk received the Human Rights Award for his tireless work in defence of the human rights and dignity particularly the rights of Uyghurs in Xinjiang.

In April 2024, Kyuchyuk was awarded the international Giovanni Malagodi prize in the Italian Senate. The award was established by the Luigi Einaudi Foundation in the name of former president of the Senate Giovanni Malagodi, and was awarded to the Bulgarian MEP for his dedication in spreading the principles of freedom and responsibility in continuation of Giovanni Malagodi's doctrine.

== See also ==
- Bulgarian Turks
