= Bulgarian Christian Coalition =

The Bulgarian Christian Coalition (Българска християнска коалиция, Balgarska Hristiyanska Koalitsiya) was a Christian democratic political party in Bulgaria. The party was founded by Krasimir Momchev (who had until then worked with the Union of Democratic Forces), Pastor Dian Karaivanov, television maker Blagovest Belev and others.

In the 1997 parliamentary elections, the Bulgarian Christian Coalition ended as the eighth party in size with 0.66% of the votes.

The Bulgarian Christian Coalition is a member of the European Christian Political Party (ECPP). The last time the party was active was during the 2009 Bulgarian parliamentary election.
