= People for Real, Open and United Democracy =

People for Real, Open and United Democracy Гражданско обединение за реална демокрация
- Abbreviation: PROUD
- Leader: Slavi Binev
- Founded: 22 April 2012
- Dissolved: 12 August 2013
- Split from: Attack
- Merged into: National Front for the Salvation of Bulgaria
- Headquarters: Sofia, Bulgaria
- Ideology: National conservatism Euroscepticism
- Political position: Right-wing
- European affiliation: Europe of Freedom and Democracy (2009–2014)

Website
- gord.bg

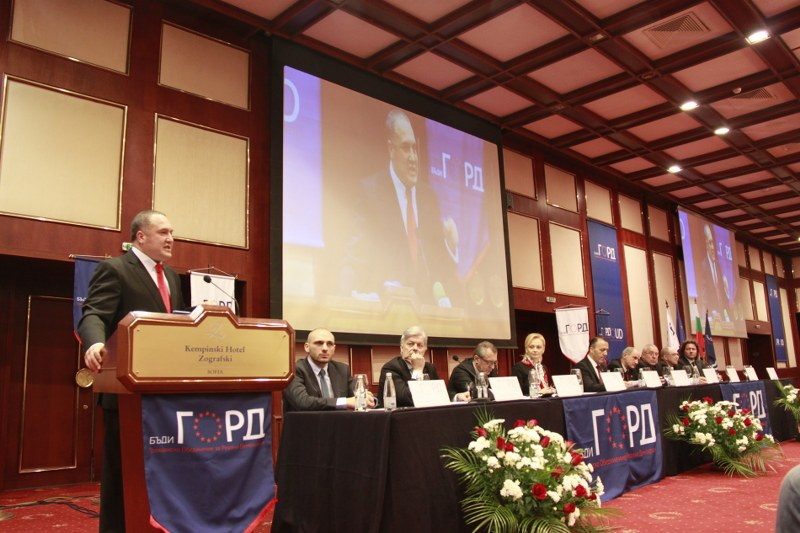

People for Real, Open and United Democracy (PROUD) was a political party in Bulgaria. It was formed by Slavcho Binev MEP on 22 April 2012, after Binev left the nationalist party Attack, for whom he had been elected to the European Parliament in 2007. In 2013 Binev's PROUD formed a pre-election coalition with 3 other political formations.
