= Emil Stoyanov =

Bulgarian politician, publisher and television executive

Emil Stoyanov MEP

Member of the European Parliament for Bulgaria
- In office 14 July 2009 – 15 November 2012

Personal details
- Born: 12 July 1959 (age 66) Plovdiv
- Party: GERB

Emil Stoyanov (Bulgarian: Емил Стоянов) (born 12 July 1959 in Plovdiv) is a Bulgarian politician, publisher and television executive. He served as a Member of the European Parliament (MEP) for the GERB party from his election in 2009 until his resignation in 2012. Prior to his election, he was appointed deputy director general of Bulgarian National Television in 1998. He also founded the Pygmalion publishing house, which specialises in German language fiction. He was awarded on honorary Order of Merit of the Federal Republic of Germany in 2005 for his work with Pygmalion. In 2017 Emil Stoyanov created a new media project - DEBATI.BG

Stoyanov is the younger brother of former Bulgarian President Petar Stoyanov.
