= Alfa TV (Bulgarian TV channel) =

Bulgarian television channel

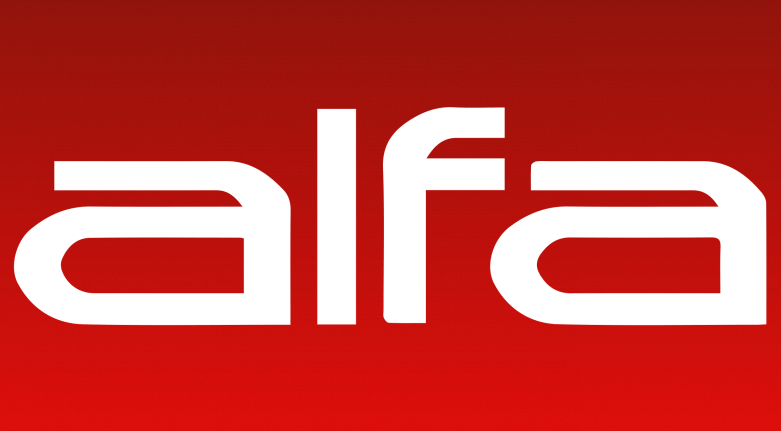
- Type: Public
- Country: Bulgaria
- Headquarters: Sofia, Bulgaria

Programming
- Language: Bulgarian
- Picture format: 16:9 (576i SD)

Ownership
- Owner: Alfa Foundation 2018

History
- Launched: 14 October 2011
- Closed: 1 November 2024

Links
- Website: alfatv.online

Alfa TV was a Bulgarian television channel owned and operated by the political party Ataka. The channel aired primarily social and political programs that reflect the views of the party in a direct manner. The channel has been described as pro-Russian.

== History ==
The channel began broadcasting with a two-month delay after several refusals for registration by the Council for Electronic Media. The television was owned by the Bulgarian political party Attack in the period 2009-2018, which announced the launch of its own television after the withdrawal of support from SKAT TV, which broadcasts the party's programs. In 2012, Volen Siderov's discussion studio - Ataka, which was broadcast by SKAT until 2009, returned to the broadcast. In 2019, ownership was transferred to the Alfa Foundation. On 3 November 2022, the channel briefly went off the air due to unpaid bills, and resumed broadcasting a week later.

On 3 June 2024, the channel's signal was stopped after the team had announced a departure due to unpaid salaries. In August 2024, the channel was restored, but was only broadcast on the web, the Vivacom network, and a number of cable operators. After several attempts to fully restore broadcasting, the channel would be closed for a final time, and was allegedly being put on sale, but the channel would officially end on 1 November 2024.
