= Mustafa Karadayi =

Bulgarian politician

MP Mustafa Karadayi
- Мустафа Карадайъ
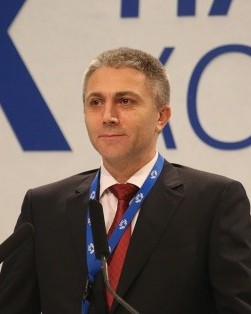
- Karadayi in 2017

Leader of the Movement for Rights and Freedoms
- In office 24 April 2016 – 7 November 2023
- Preceded by: Lyutvi Mestan
- Succeeded by: Delyan Peevski; Dzhevdet Chakarov

Member of the National Assembly
- Incumbent
- Assumed office 21 May 2013
- Constituency: 22nd MMC – Smolyan (2013-2017); 9th MMC – Kardzhali (2017-2021); 30th MMC – Shumen (2021-present)

Personal details
- Born: Mustafa Sali Karadayı; 8 May 1970 (age 56) Borino, PR Bulgaria
- Party: DPS (since 1991)
- Children: 2
- Education: University of National and World Economy
- Occupation: Politician

Mustafa Sali Karadayi (Bulgarian: Мустафа Сали Карадайъ, Turkish: Mustafa Sali Karadayı) is a Turkish Bulgarian politician who has been a Member of the National Assembly of Bulgaria since 2013. Throughout his tenure, he also served as the leader of his party, the Movement for Rights and Freedoms (DPS), from 2016 to 2023.

== Personal life ==
Mustafa Karadayi is married and has two children.

He graduated from the University of National and World Economy in Sofia, Bulgaria.

== Academic career ==
From 1996 to 2001 he was a professor of Informatics at New Bulgarian University.

== Political career ==
He is the founder of the Academic Society of MFR in Sofia and a member of the MRF since May 1991. He founded the youth wing of MRF and chaired it from 1998 to 2003. From 2002 to 2010 he was deputy executive director of the Agency for Post-Privatization Control.

Secretary of the Central Election Commission.

Since 2010, Karadayi was the organizational secretary of the Central Operative Bureau (COB) MRF.

Karadayi was elected to the Bulgarian parliament in 2013.

Since 24 December 2015 he was one of three co-chairs of the interim MRF to IX National Conference of the party after Lyutvi Mestan was expelled.

Karadayi announced that he no longer wanted to be the chairman of the party and officially announced his resignation on 7 November 2023.

=== Chairman of the Movement for Rights and Freedoms ===
On 24 April 2016 he was unanimously elected chairman of the MRF by the IX National Conference of the party.

Karadayi announced his resignation as the chairman on 7 November 2023.
