= Blagovest Belev =

Bulgarian politician

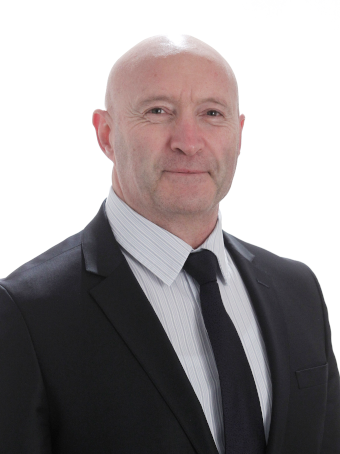

Member of the National Assembly of Bulgaria

Personal details
- Born: 9 October 1963 (age 61); Plovdiv, Bulgaria
- Political party: We Continue the Change
- Occupation: Politician

Blagovest Chanev Belev (Bulgarian: Благовест Чанев Бєлєв; 9 October 1963) is a Bulgarian politician from We Continue the Change. People's representative in the XLVII National Assembly.

== Biography ==
Blagovest Belev was born on 9 October 1963 in Plovdiv, People's Republic of Bulgaria. He graduated from Nikola Vaptsarov Naval Academy with a degree in Shipbuilding. In 2006, he obtained the degree of long range captain. Since 1991 he has been a lecturer at the Maritime School.

In the parliamentary elections of November 2021 as a candidate for MP he was 5th on the list of We Continue the Change for the

3rd MMC – Varna, from where he was elected.
