= Dimitar Stoyanov (politician) =

Bulgarian politician (born 1983)

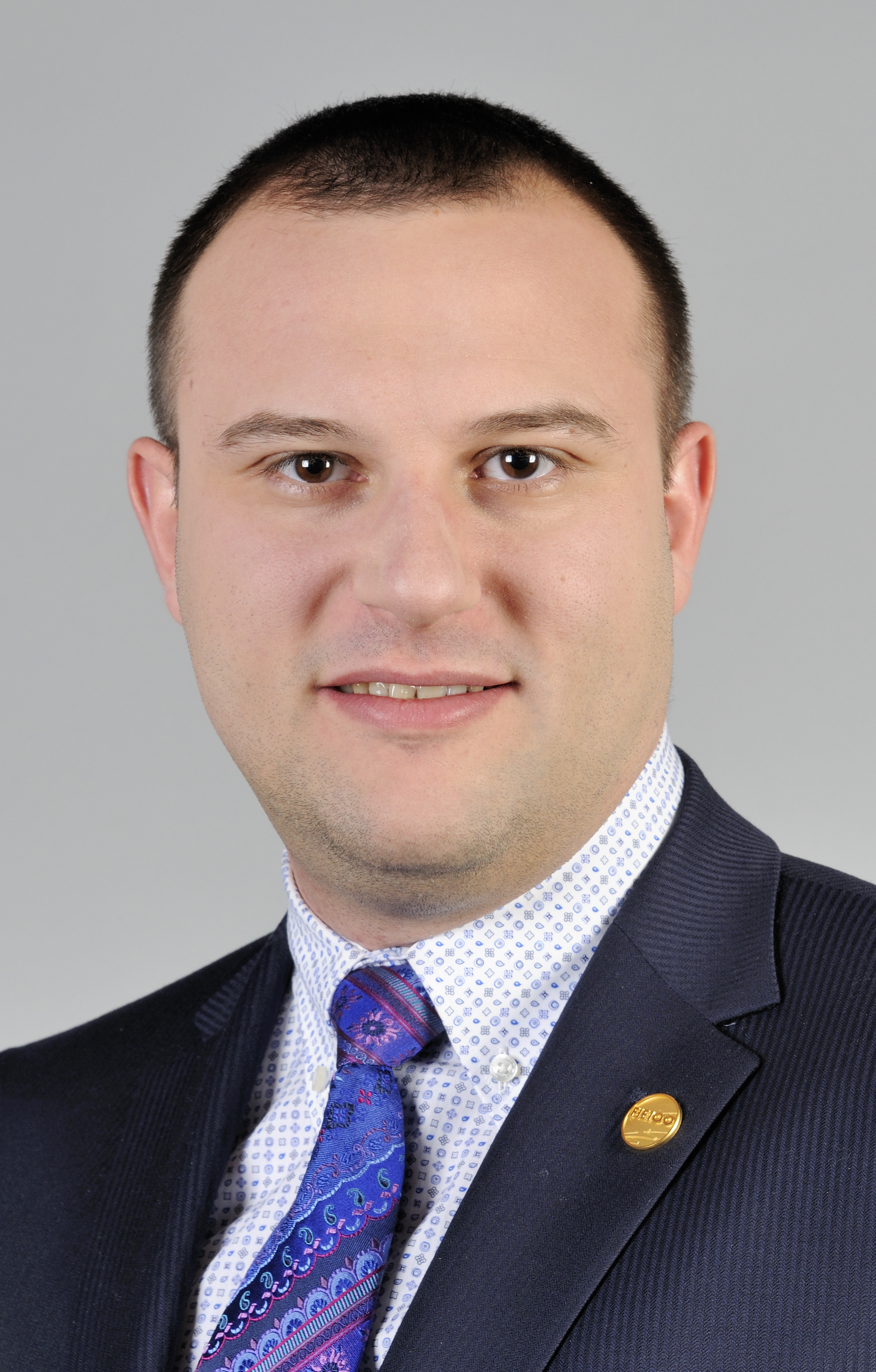
Stoyanov

Dimitar Kinov Stoyanov (Bulgarian: Димитър Кинов Стоянов; born 17 May 1983 in Sofia) is a Bulgarian and EU politician.

While still a student of law at Sofia University, Dimitar Stoyanov joined the Attack party headed by Volen Siderov. Stoyanov was elected in 2005 as the youngest member of the National Assembly of Bulgaria on the list of the Ataka coalition with several minor nationalist parties. In August 2005 Stoyanov became an Observer to the European Parliament (EP), and, in January 2007, a temporary Member of the EP from the Ataka quota. Stoyanov was elected a member of the European Parliament from Bulgaria in the May 2007 Bulgarian election and re-elected in the June 2009 election. He was a member of the Identity, Tradition, Sovereignty (ITS) political group until the group ceased to exist on November 14, 2007. He is a former non-attached MEP.

ITS MEP Ashley Mote criticized Stoyanov over comments he made saying he opposed the "Jewish establishment".

Stoyanov raised controversy in the European Parliament when he attacked Roma activist Livia Jaroka MEP with an e-mail to his colleagues, claiming that "In my country there are tens of thousands of Gypsy girls who are much more beautiful than this honourable one... You can even buy yourself a loving wife aged 12 or 13 ... The best of them are very expensive – up to €5,000 each. Wow!"
