= SKAT (television) =

Television SKAT
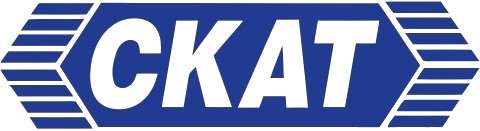
- Country: Bulgaria
- Headquarters: Burgas

Programming
- Language: Bulgarian
- Picture format: 16:9 576i

Ownership
- Owner: Valeri Simeonov
- Sister channels: Skat +

History
- Launched: 24 January 1994

Links
- Website: www.skat.bg

Skat Television (Bulgarian: Национална телевизия Скат) is a Bulgarian national cable television company. The company was founded in 1992 in Burgas and is headquartered there. Skat is also the name for one of the channels which Skat television operates from the Bulgarian capital city Sofia.

== History ==
Skat as a cable TV company operates mostly in the Burgas Province and has created cable networks in many populated places near the Black Sea coast. The company, like the other cable TV operators in Burgas, provides analogue television, digital television, Internet access with modem, optics, PON, LAN and RLAN, and telephone services. Today the company owns the largest optical-coaxial cable network on the territory of the Burgas and Targovishte regions. Skat's headquarters are located in Burgas, and a regional TV channel called "Skat +" is broadcast from there to many places in the province. The main Skat channel was also broadcast from Burgas, until the early 2000s (decade), when it was relocated to Sofia.

== Controversies ==
In 2005 Skat television became a center of controversy caused by the company's hosting of programs and shows supporting Bulgarian nationalist political party Attack. Attack openly associates with such organizations as the National Front in France. Complaints from the Bulgarian Helsinki Committee and the political party Euroroma, stating that various Skat TV shows were focused on racial intolerance and racism, caused the Council for Electronic Media (CEM) to announce investigations into the programs broadcast on the Skat cable television channel in July – August 2005. In November 2009 Skat withdrew its support for Attack. On 17 May 2011 Skat created its own nationalist party called National Front for the Salvation of Bulgaria.

In 2012, Jehovah's Witnesses filed a complaint with the Commission for Protection against Discrimination stating that SKAT TV had systematically slandered the Witnesses and incited violence and hatred against them. The Commission unanimously decided in favour of the Witnesses in January 2016.
