= Desislav Chukolov =

Bulgarian politician (1974–2022)

Desislav Slavov Chukolov (Bulgarian: Десислав Славов Чуколов; 22 December 1974 – March 2022) was a Bulgarian politician who was one of the leading figures of the Attack Party.

He was born in Ruse, Bulgaria.

Chukolov was elected member of the European Parliament from Bulgaria on 20 May 2007. He was a member of the Identity, Tradition, Sovereignty (ITS) political group until the group ceased to exist on 14 November 2007. He sat as a non-attached MEP. In addition to his native Bulgarian, Chukolov also spoke English, German and Russian. He was Eastern Orthodox.

He died in March 2022, at the age of 47 after a serious illness.
