= Slavcho Binev =

Bulgarian politician (1965–2026)

- Славчо Бинев
- Binev in 2010

Member of the European Parliament for Bulgaria
- In office 2007–2014

Member of the Bulgarian Parliament for Haskovo Province
- In office 2014–2017

Personal details
- Born: 10 December 1965 Sofia, PR Bulgaria
- Died: 24 October 2026 (aged 60) Sofia, Bulgaria
- Cause of death: Assassination by gunshot
- Party: Attack (until 2012); People for Real, Open and United Democracy (2012–2013); National Front for the Salvation of Bulgaria (2013–2017); Movement for Rights and Freedoms (from 2017)
- Spouse: Maria
- Children: 5, including Elena
- Occupation: Politician, taekwondo athlete

Slavcho Penchev Binev (Bulgarian: Славчо Пенчев Бинев; 10 December 1965 – 24 October 2026), sometimes Slavi Binev (Bulgarian: Слави Бинев), was a Bulgarian politician and taekwondo champion. He served as a Member of the European Parliament (MEP) from 2007 to 2014, from the Attack party. Binev was controversial in Bulgaria for alleged links to crime, and for his blessing as an archon by a bishop of the Bulgarian Orthodox Church.

== Before politics ==
Slavcho Binev was born on 10 December 1965, in Sofia, Bulgaria. Binev became a European taekwondo champion in 1992. After retiring from the sport, he later became president of the Bulgarian Olympic Taekwondo Federation and a vice-president of the European Taekwondo Union, holding the former position until his death in 2026.

In the early 1990s, he managed several entertainment venues in Sofia through his MIG Group. A confidential 2005 report from the US Embassy in Sofia on organized crime, published by WikiLeaks, contained allegations that the group was involved in prostitution, drugs and stolen-car trafficking. From the start of the 1990s until 2006, Slavi Binev was one of the main shareholders in R – System Holding AD. At that time the American newspaper The Washington Times published an editorial article, entitled “New kids on the Eastern Block”, dedicated to Slavi Binev and his achievements in the business sphere.

== Political career ==
Binev was elected a Member of the European Parliament for the nationalist Attack party on 20 May 2007, immediately after Bulgaria joined the European Union. Along with Attack's two other MEPs, he sat with the Identity, Tradition, Sovereignty (ITS) group; this group collapsed in November 2007, leaving Attack as non-inscrits members. He was Attack's candidate for Mayor of Sofia in 2007. At the 2009 European election, Attack lost one MEP, but Binev retained his seat as the second of two elected for the party. Binev and Attack remained as non-inscrits members.

On 22 April 2012, he founded his own party: People for Real, Open and United Democracy. Binev joined the EFD group in the European Parliament in 2012.

In February 2009, Binev co-initiated a written declaration in the European Parliament calling for the reopening of Units 1–4 of Bulgaria's Kozloduy nuclear power station, due to an energy crisis triggered by the interruption of Russian gas supplies.

In March 2013, Binev attended the UK Independence Party's spring conference in the Devonshire city of Exeter, United Kingdom. Addressing delegates, Binev joked that UKIP Deputy leader Paul Nuttall did not have to wear a bullet proof vest on his visit to Sofia and thanked him for his visit on behalf of the EFD. Binev also spoke of the dangers of socialism and dictatorship, whilst explaining the extent of corruption that exists in Bulgaria and emphasising the importance of democracy.

Binev's PROUD was dissolved in August 2013, merging into the NFSB. He joined the Patriotic Front in 2014 and he took part in the 2014 Bulgarian Parliamentary elections, earning a seat from the Haskovo region.

In late November 2014, Binev was appointed chairman of the Commission for Culture and Media (Bulgarian: Комисия по култура и медии), which led to serious criticism and protests from actors, theatre performers, TV and radio journalists as well as other intellectuals, mainly due to what was regarded by them as his lack of familiarity with and interest in cultural issues and cultural politics. On 8 December 2014, Binev resigned from his position because of the societal discontent.

In September 2017, Binev was nominated by Attack to be a candidate in the mayoral elections for Sofia; he was ultimately not elected.

In what was regarded by many as a surprising move due to his previous membership in parties subscribing to Bulgarian nationalism, in 2017 he switched to the MRF.

== Personal life ==
Binev was blessed as an archon at Basilica of Saint Mary Major in Rome on 3 January 2007, by bishop Metropolitan Galaktion of Stara Zagora. This sparked tensions between Bulgaria and the Holy See. The title had previously been unused in the country but was bestowed recently on controversial businessmen who make "donations which do not contravene Christian morals and good manners". Later, on 24 January, the Bulgarian Orthodox Church's Holy Synod declared the conferral invalid, stating that Metropolitan Galaktion had acted without authorisation from the Synod, and that the title was not an official ecclesiastical distinction that could be awarded in the Church's name.

He was married to Maria, with whom he had five children: Martina, Miroslava, Kaloyan, Elena (a member of the Bulgarian national team in rhythmic gymnastics) and Viktoria. Binev was conversant in French, English, Russian, and Italian in addition to his native Bulgarian.

=== Death ===
On 24 October 2026, Binev was shot and killed at his home in Sofia, at the age of 60. According to the acting chief secretary of the Interior Ministry, Lyubomir Nikolov, three people who frequently visited his home had been at the address. A witness then reported hearing gunfire and three people fleeing in a car. Police subsequently arrested the three suspects on the Trakia motorway near the Trajan's Gate tunnel, in the direction of Plovdiv.
