= Vladimir Urutchev =

Bulgarian politician

Vladimir Urutchev MEP
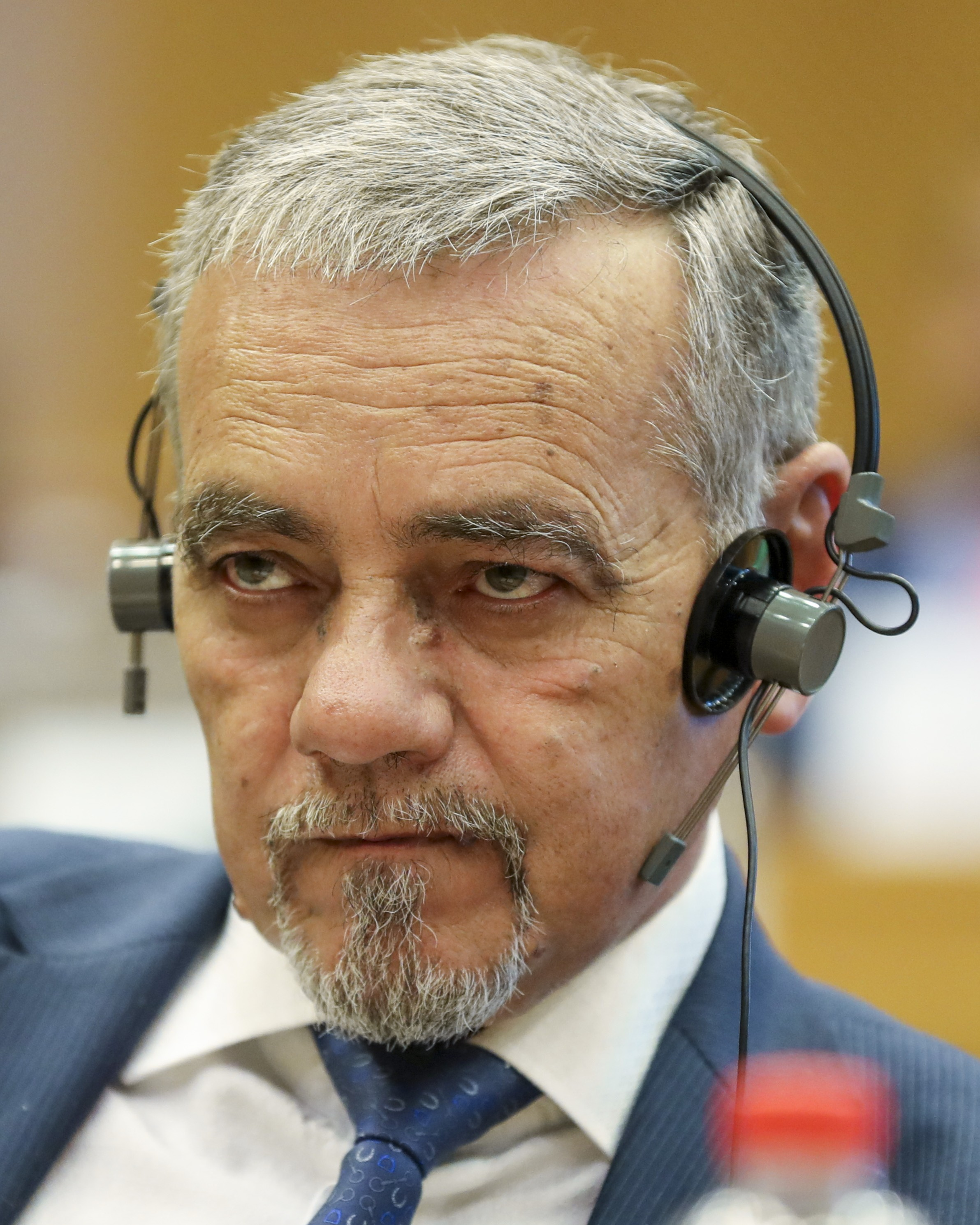
- Urutchev in 2018
- Incumbent
- Assumed office 6 June 2007

Personal details
- Born: 1 October 1954 (age 71) Smolyan Province
- Party: GERB

Vladimir Andreev Urutchev (Bulgarian: Владимир Андреев Уручев) (born 1 October 1954 in Smolyan Province) is a Bulgarian politician who serves as a Member of the European Parliament (MEP) for the GERB. Following Bulgaria's accession to the European Union in 2007, he was elected as one of the first group of Bulgarian members of the European Parliament. He was subsequently re-elected in 2009. Before becoming an MEP, Urutchev had worked as a nuclear engineer at the Kozloduy Nuclear Power Plant.

In 2019, Urutchev was the recipient of the Energy Award at The Parliament Magazine's annual MEP Awards.
