= United Agrarians =

Bulgarian political party

The United Agrarians (Bulgarian: Обединени земеделци) are a political party in Bulgaria. The conservative agrarian party was established in 2008 after a split within the Agrarian People's Union. It is currently led by Anastasia Dimitrova-Moser.
