= Identity, Tradition, Sovereignty =

Former far-right political group of the European Parliament

- European Parliament group
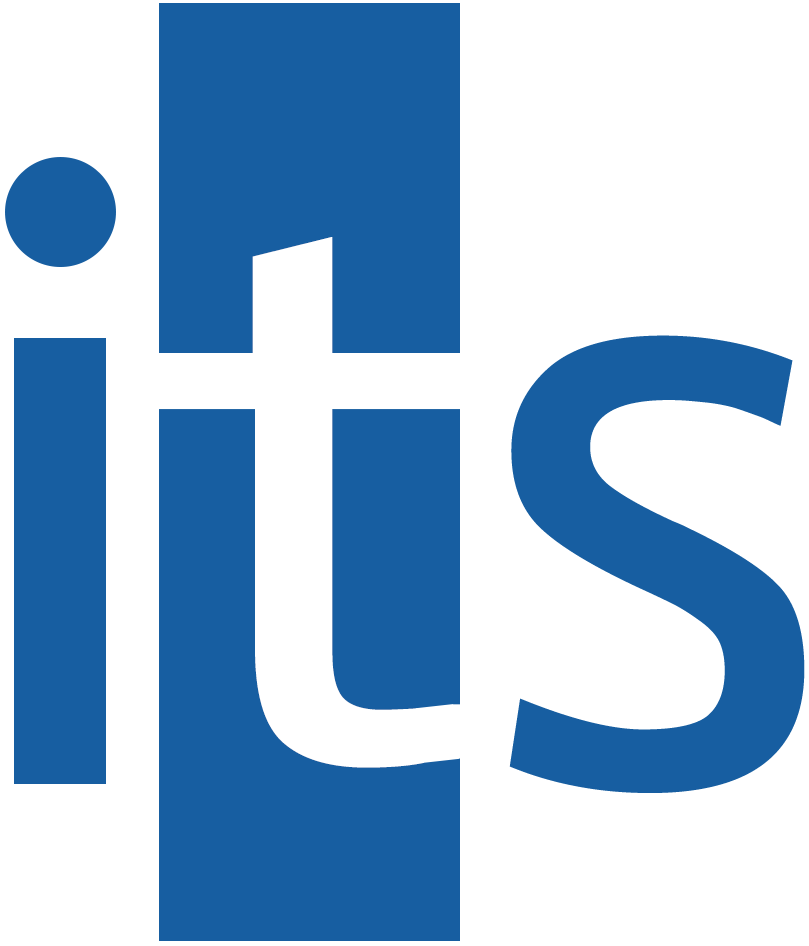
- Name: Identity, Tradition, Sovereignty
- English abbr.: ITS
- French abbr.: ITS
- Formal name: Identity, Tradition and Sovereignty Group
- Ideology: Nationalism; Ultraconservatism; Sovereigntism; Euroscepticism; Anti-immigration
- Political position: Far-right
- European parties: Euronat
- From: 15 January 2007
- To: 14 November 2007
- Chaired by: Bruno Gollnisch
- Website: its-pe.eu (archived URL)

Identity, Tradition, Sovereignty (French: Identité, tradition, souveraineté, abbr. ITS, stylised its) was a far-right political group that operated in the European Parliament between January and November 2007. It was composed of 23 MEPs and only existed during the European Parliament's 6th term. While a common political charter for the ITS was signed on 9 January 2007, the ITS was recognised as a political group on 15 January by parliamentary president Josep Borrell.

Ideologically, ITS was nationalist, ultraconservative, Eurosceptic, and strongly opposed to immigration. The largest party within ITS was the far-right extremist National Front of Jean-Marie Le Pen, while its members were also parties like the Greater Romania Party (PRM), Vlaams Belang and Bulgarian Attack. Following remarks made by Alessandra Mussolini, the MEP of Social Alternative, that Romanian ITS members found insulting, the PRM withdrew from the group, thus disqualifying it as an official group. Hence, it formally ceased to exist on 14 November 2007.

== History ==
To form a political group in the European Parliament, there needed to be 20 MEPs from six different states (subsequently increased to 25 MEPs from seven states, for the 2009 session). The accession of Bulgaria and Romania brought into the European Parliament a number of new far-right MEPs, providing sufficient numbers to create a far-right group. Incentives for creating a group are approximately €1 million in public funds and guaranteed seats on the committees of the European Parliament. There were concerns in other parties about public funds and influence going towards a group with such an ideology. Despite attempts to block the group's formation, it was formed on 15 January 2007. However, other MEPs successfully blocked ITS from gaining positions on Parliamentary committees, including two vice-presidencies, despite normally being entitled to them.

The largest component was the French National Front and its chairman in the Parliament, Bruno Gollnisch, was chair of the ITS group. The National Front had previous allied with other far-right groups, beginning in the 1980s. Following the Bulgarian European Parliament elections, the group gained two more Ataka MEPs, Slavcho Binev and Desislav Chukolov.

The PRM announced on 8 November 2007 that it would withdraw its five members from the group on 12 November 2007 over comments made by Alessandra Mussolini over the expulsion of Romanian criminals from Italy in early November 2007, thus dooming the parliamentary group to falter less than a year after its creation. Andreas Mölzer stated in an interview with Die Presse that the group was searching for other MEPs who might join their group to save it. Other MEPs had already welcomed the prospect of the group's demise, with Alyn Smith MEP stating that it "warms the heart" to watch them arguing among themselves. During the previous months, the group had failed to act as a coherent political faction.

It was announced that the group had been dissolved on 14 November 2007 after four of the five PRM members left the group.

== Policies ==
The group's founding charter has been described as "broadly anti-immigration, anti-EU constitution and anti-Turkish EU membership," while participants emphasised that the group would function relatively loosely. Alessandra Mussolini described it as "more a technical than a political group [...] We are mainly getting together out of necessity. Survival is only possible in a political group."

The Romanian PRM leader stated that he favoured a strong association and eventual EU membership for Turkey provided it settles the dispute regarding Cyprus and that the common ground for the new group is based exactly on the values the group's name suggests.

== Members ==
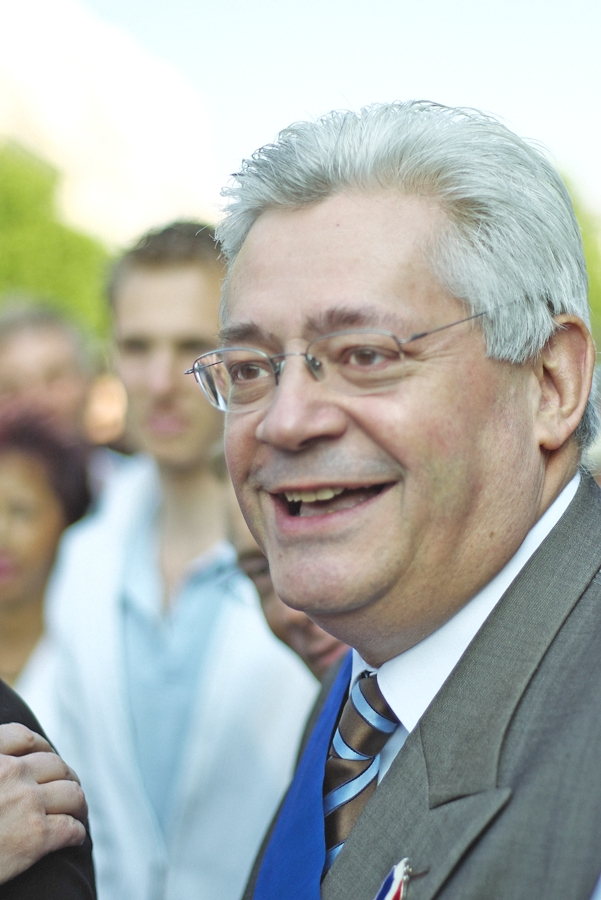
Bruno Gollnisch, chair of the ITS group

The membership of ITS while it existed between January and November 2007:

Country	Name		Ideology	MEPs
France	National Front	FN	National conservatism Right-wing populism	7 / 732
Romania	Greater Romania Party	PRM	Romanian nationalism Romanian irredentism	5 / 732
Romania	Mircea Coșea (Ind.)			1 / 732
Belgium	Vlaams Belang	VB	Flemish nationalism Right-wing populism	3 / 732
Bulgaria	Attack		Ultranationalism; Right-wing populism	3 / 732
Italy	Social Alternative	AS	Neo-fascism; Euroscepticism	1 / 732
Italy	Tricolour Flame	FT	Neo-fascism; Euroscepticism	1 / 732
Austria	Freedom Party of Austria	FPO	National conservatism Right-wing populism	1 / 732
United Kingdom	Ashley Mote (Ind.)			1 / 732

== See also ==
- Euronat (1997-2009)
- Identity and Democracy
- Europe of Nations and Freedom (2015–2019)
- Group of the European Right (1984–89)
- Technical Group of the European Right (1989–94)
- Pan-European identity
