= Petya Stavreva =

Bulgarian journalist and politician (1977–2024)

- Петя Ставрева

Member of the National Assembly of Bulgaria
- In office 16 November 2023 – 6 May 2024
- Constituency: 13th MMC – Pazardzhik

Leader of United Agrarians
- In office 26 March 2011 – 6 May 2024
- Preceded by: Anastasia Dimitrova-Moser
- Succeeded by: Georgi Tashev

Member of the European Parliament
- In office 6 June 2007 – 13 July 2009

Personal details
- Born: 29 April 1977 Plovdiv, Bulgaria
- Died: 6 May 2024 (aged 47) Pazardzhik, Bulgaria
- Party: United Agrarians (2006-2024); BZNS - NS (until 2006)
- Other political affiliations: EPP (2007-2009); PP–DB (2023-2024)
- Education: Sofia University
- Occupation: Journalist

Petya Stavreva (Bulgarian: Петя Ставрева; 29 April 1977 – 6 May 2024) was a Bulgarian journalist and politician. A member of the United Agrarians party, she served in the European Parliament from 2007 to 2009, having been elected on the Agrarian-GERB coalition list. She also served in the National Assembly from 2023 to 2024, elected from the PP–DB coalition, which her party had joined.

Stavreva died in Pazardzhik on 6 May 2024, at the age of 47.
