= Mariela Baeva =

Bulgarian writer, researcher, and philologist

- Мариела Баева
- Born: Mariela Velichkova Baeva; October 22, 1964 (age 62); Sofia, Bulgaria
- Education: Sofia University
- Occupations: Writer; researcher; philologist
- Known for: Member of the European Parliament (2007–2009)

Mariela Velichkova Baeva (Bulgarian: Мариела Баева; born October 22, 1964, in Sofia) is a writer, researcher, philologist, and former BG MEP who was born in Sofia, Bulgaria. She served as a Member of the European Parliament for the 6th term from June 6, 2007 through July 13, 2009. Baeva is a contributor to the OECD's Local Economic and Employment Development (LEED) programme. She is also a member of The Women Writers Committee of PEN International. Baeva speaks English, French and Russian. In 2016 Baeva was placed on The Economist's European Diversity Awards (EDA) as one of the world's top fifty defenders of human rights and social inclusion. Her consultancy firm has run projects in France, the Netherlands, Germany, England, Luxembourg, Greece, Ireland and Canada.

== Early years ==
Baeva was born in the People's Republic of Bulgaria, a socialist republic. In her early twenties she worked for a youth organization of the national government, the Bulgarian Communist Party (BCP). By 1990, the Bulgarian Socialist Party (BSP) had replaced Marxism–Leninism with a centre-left political ideology and replaced the BCP name with BSP. In effect, Baeva lived through the transition from communism to democracy in the 1990s. In 1991 Baeva completed her degree in English philology at Sofia University St. Kliment Ohridski. Her post-graduate studies were in the field of European integration.

== Early career ==
Following her graduation in 1991, she was a lecturer at Mendel University, in Brno, Czech Republic.

== Political career ==
While serving as Member of the European Parliament (MEP) from June 6, 2007 through July 13, 2009, Baeva was a member of the Group of the Alliance of Liberals and Democrats for Europe, a Bulgarian national party, the Turkish Movement for Rights and Freedoms, the Committee on Economic and Monetary Affairs, Baeva supported micro-credit the Delegation for relations with the countries of South Asia. She also served as substitute on the Committee on Foreign Affairs and as delegation for relations with the United States.

== #BringBackOurGirls campaigner ==
In her May 21, 2014 article published in the EU The Parliament Magazine, as part of her advocacy for a global education movement, called for support of the #BringBackOurGirls "international campaign in support of finding the 276 schoolgirls kidnapped from the Christian village of Chibok, Nigeria on April 14, 2014 by the Islamist militant group Boko Haram. By February 2018, 100 of the girls were still missing. The #BringBackOurGirls, which "generated more than 4.5m tweets globally", continued to exert pressure on the Nigerian government during the negotiations to release the remaining girls.

== Awards ==
=== European Diversity Awards (EDA) ===
Baeva was selected for The Economist's 2016 shortlist as Campaigner of the Year for the European Diversity Awards (EDA), a list of the world's top fifty defenders of human rights and social includion. Other nominees of the EDA event held at the Natural History Museum included Barack and Michelle Obama, Bill Gates, Hillary Clinton, Dalai Lama, Malala Yousafzai, British Crown Prince Henry, CNN journalist Christiane Amanpour. Baeva was the only representative from Eastern Europe on the top 50 list. The EDA honors "individuals and organisations" in "business, media, politics and the third sector" who "have made an outstanding contribution to equality, diversity and inclusion across Europe. The EDA described Baeva as "An incisive speaker and writer on global issues, including climate change, Beava recently supported a European initiative for the development of micro-credit to stimulate growth and employment. She champions inclusion and diversity, is pro-gay rights and women’s rights, and has added greatly to the debate in Bulgaria and Eastern Europe on these issues."

== Selected publications and series ==
In 2001, Baeva's fictional short story, "The Letter", was published in an anthology of the Women Writers Committee of International PEN, Notre Voix, Our Voice. The events in "The Letter" take place at the 1957 signing of the Treaty of Rome by Belgium, France, Italy, Luxembourg, the Netherlands and West Germany, one of the most important treaties of the modern day European Union. The letter was written by the fictional journalist Adriana's brother who was killed during the critical WWII 1944 battle in the port town of Anzio, Italy that "turned the German flank and opened the road to Rome" but took the lives of 28,000 Allied soldiers. Her brother had been moved by the story of a little girl British soldiers found alone and crying on the beach - Angelita. She was killed soon after when the Red Cross ambulance she was in, was bombed. She became a symbol of the war even though she may never have really existed. As Adriana, gave the letter to Paul-Henri Spaak, then Belgian Foreign Minister, the first to sign the Treaty, she said, "In memorium. For the 53 million casualties of soldiers and civilians. And for your commitment to an "ever closer union."

Her books include In the Hug of Arms and the novel The Day was born, which was released in English in 2006. In the novel, the lives of an ex-politician, his son and daughter, unfold against a backdrop of socio-political change as Bulgaria transitioned from communism to democracy after 1989.

== The Women Writers Committee of PEN International ==
As a member of The Women Writers Committee of PEN International and a former BG MEP, Baeva helped support the nomination of Malala Yousafzai for the 2013 Sakharov Prize for Freedom of Thought which honors "exceptional individuals who combat intolerance, fanaticism and oppression". Baeva wrote that "We are fighting for the message behind Malala's struggle - saying "no" to any regime that deprives a young person from the value of education."

== European Parliament to Campus Programme ==
Since leaving the EP, Baeva has been holding activities with co-organizers, the European Parliament to Campus Programme and Professor Lubor Lacina, for groups of international students specializing in European Studies at Mendel University's think tank - "Mendel European Center". This has included conferences, seminars for students and round tables for the public.

On November 15, 2015 Baeva spoke on "The Internal Market, its specifics and the "flaws" in EMU design" In September 2016, Baeva was involved in the "refugee solidarity concert series Give a Home, which "took place in cities all over the world" and included Ed Sheeran along with 1,000 artists performing in support for the cause of the refugees.

In 2017, with the "unprecedented global movement of people", the 60 international students focused on "the most disadvantaged groups of people globally: refugees and migrants." Topics and lectures included "EU Migration Insights 2017 in light of the "unprecedented global movement of people" and The role of the EP in the UK’s withdrawal from the EU." They grounded their discussion on two surveys, the London-based Royal Institute of International Affairs (Chatham House) survey which "probe the attitudes in the EU towards the perceived effects of migration, the refugee crisis and how it has been managed since 2015" and "Islam in European societies" and the Vienna-based EU Agency for Fundamental Rights (FRA) survey which focused on "the experiences of Muslim refugees and their children born in EU MSs".

In the 2018 in collaboration with Lacina and Baeva, students from Syria, Ghana, Croatia, Ukraine, and Czech Republic, completed the session with a song entitled "Race to Freedom", a "call for empathy", with lyrics composed by Baeva and music by a British composer. The video created on December 18, 2017 by Mendel University's audiovisual unit dedicated their "mutual project" to International Migrants Day and World Refugee Day.

== Personal life ==
Baeva has two children.
