= Svetoslav Malinov =

Bulgarian politician

- Светослав Малинов
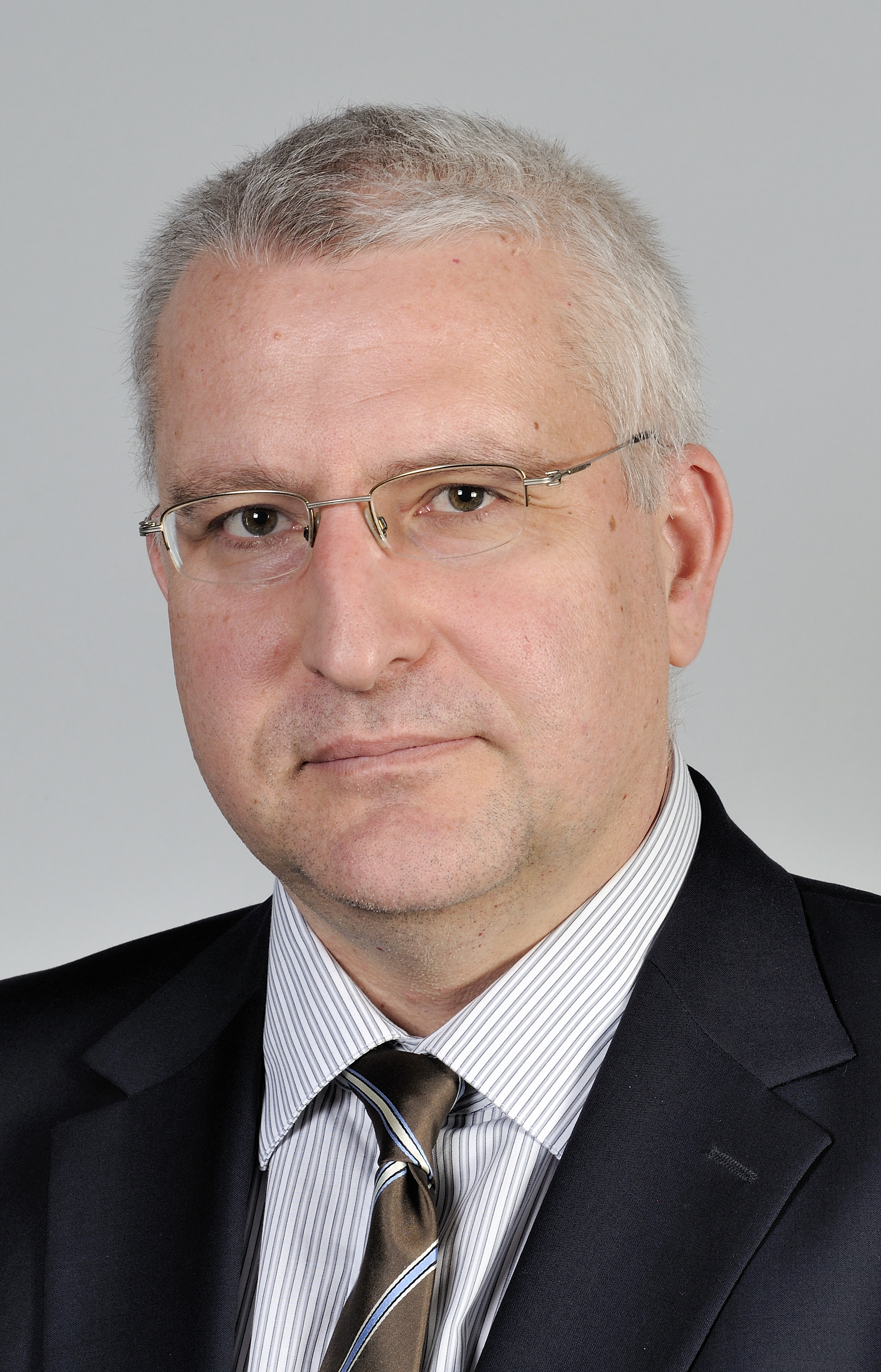
- Official portrait, 2014

Member of the European Parliament for Bulgaria
- In office 1 December 2011 – 1 July 2019
- Preceded by: Position established (Note: Following the Lisbon Treaty, Bulgaria gained an extra seat in the European Parliament, resulting in Malinov assuming office as MEP.)
- Succeeded by: Radan Kanev

Member of the National Assembly
- In office 11 July 2005 – 25 June 2009
- Constituency: 2nd MMC - Burgas

Personal details
- Born: 19 January 1968 (age 58) Dupnitsa, PR Bulgaria
- Party: Bulgaria: DSB (European Union) EU: EPP
- Children: 3
- Education: Sofia University
- Profession: Politician

Svetoslav Hristov Malinov (Bulgarian: Светослав Христов Малинов) (born 19 January 1968 in Dupnitsa) is a Bulgarian politician. He is a member of Democrats for a Strong Bulgaria, part of the European People's Party, and became a Member of the European Parliament (MEP) on 1 December 2011.
