= Bilyana Raeva =

Bulgarian politician

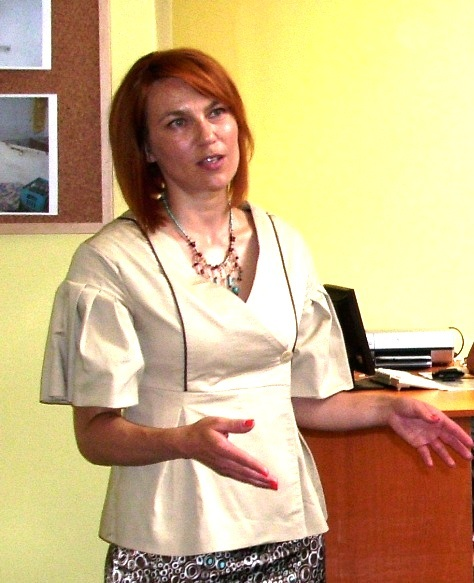
- Raeva in 2008

Member of the European Parliament
- In office 2007–2009

Personal details
- Born: 12 July 1973 (age 52) Varna, Bulgaria
- Party: National Movement for Stability and Progress
- Other political affiliations: Alliance of Liberals and Democrats for Europe group

Bilyana Ilieva Raeva (born 12 July 1973 in Varna) is a Bulgarian politician who was a member of the 6th session of the European Parliament, 2007–2009. She is a member of the National Movement for Stability and Progress within the Alliance of Liberals and Democrats for Europe group.
