= Attack (political party) =

Attack Атака
- Leader: Volen Siderov
- Founded: 17 April 2005
- Headquarters: 1 Vrabcha St., 1000 Sofia
- Newspaper: Ataka Newspaper
- Youth wing: National Youth Organization Attack
- TV station: Alfa TV
- Ideology: Bulgarian nationalism; Ultranationalism; Right-wing populism; Russophilia; Anti-Islam; Anti-Romani; Anti-Turkish
- Political position: Far-right
- Religion: Bulgarian Orthodox Church
- National affiliation: Neutral Bulgaria (2023)
- European Parliament group: Identity, Tradition, Sovereignty (2007)
- Colours: Bulgarian national colours: White Green Red
- Slogan: "Let's take back Bulgaria" (Bulgarian: "Да си върнем България")
- National Assembly: 0 / 240
- European Parliament: 0 / 17

Party flag
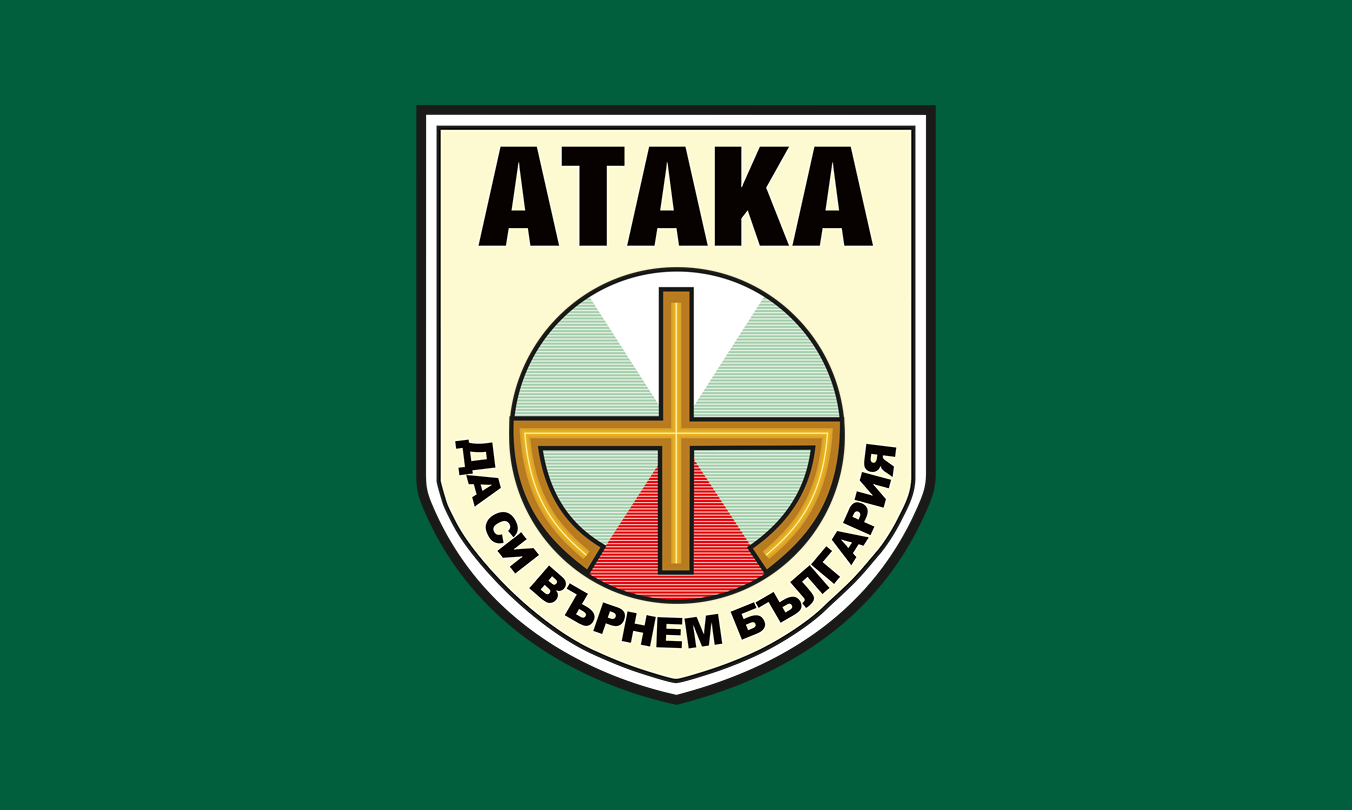

Website
- ataka.bg

Attack (Bulgarian: Атака, romanized: Ataka) is a nationalist political party in Bulgaria, founded in 2005 by Volen Siderov, who was at the time presenter of the homonymous TV show Attack on SKAT TV.

There are different opinions on where to place the party in the political spectrum: according to most scholars it is extreme right, according to others extreme left, or a synthesis of left- and right-wing. The leadership of the party asserts that their party is "neither left nor right, but Bulgarian". The party is considered ultranationalist and anti-Roma, as well as being anti-Muslim and anti-Turkish. The party opposes Bulgarian membership in NATO and requires revision for what it calls the 'double standards' for the membership in the European Union, while members visit international Orthodox and anti-globalization congresses and the party is closely tied with the Bulgarian Orthodox Church. It advocates the re-nationalisation of privatised companies and seeks to prioritize spending on education, healthcare and welfare.

In the Bulgarian parliamentary elections of 2005, 2009, and 2013 Attack was consistently the fourth-strongest party. In the 2014 European Parliament election, the party won no seats. Attack was a member of the former Identity, Tradition, Sovereignty European parliamentary group.

== Ideology ==
The Attack Party is a nationalist party. Its political program consists of two documents, some 20 principles, and a program schedule with 10 articles. They define Bulgaria as a one-nation state and assert the supremacy of the state and the Bulgarian nation above ethnic and religious diversity. The party program contains some radical proposals for changes in the constitution of the Republic of Bulgaria, such as institutionalization of the Bulgarian Orthodox Church and recognition of Orthodoxy as the official religion, as well as participation of the Church in legislative work, all important government decisions and teaching of the Church's doctrine in primary school. The 20 Principles envisage sanctions for defamation of the Bulgarian national sacraments and for slurs against Bulgaria. They require investigation of criminals grown rich and of all transactions involving politicians and foreign debt transactions, confiscation of illegally acquired property and the creation of a fund for free medical care from the confiscated property. Attack has so far called most of the present-day politicians national traitors.

According to the 20 principles, the health, social security, education, spiritual and material prosperity of the Bulgarian nation must be priority number one for the Bulgarian government. A legal minimum wage would be introduced, corresponding to the average European wage, as the Bulgarian living standard is below the average European standard and many Bulgarians live in poverty. Another statement in the 20 Principles is that Bulgarian manufacture is mostly stolen by foreigners, and therefore trade and banks must be in Bulgarian hands, and Bulgarian business, whether public or private, must be assisted by the state both inside and outside its boundaries. Another principle states that incomes and taxes should be tailored to the needs of the Bulgarian population and "not by the IMF and the World Bank". The party demands general revision of the budget in favor of Bulgarian citizens as opposed to the management elite, and reduction of useless administration. Referendums are required on all issues affecting the lives of more than 10 percent of the nation. Another principle demands Bulgaria leave NATO, full neutrality, and no foreign military bases on Bulgarian territory.

The party tends to be on the left of the political spectrum on economic matters, including being protectionist, while being heavily towards the right on matters of ethics, national identity/culture, and religion.

== Activity ==
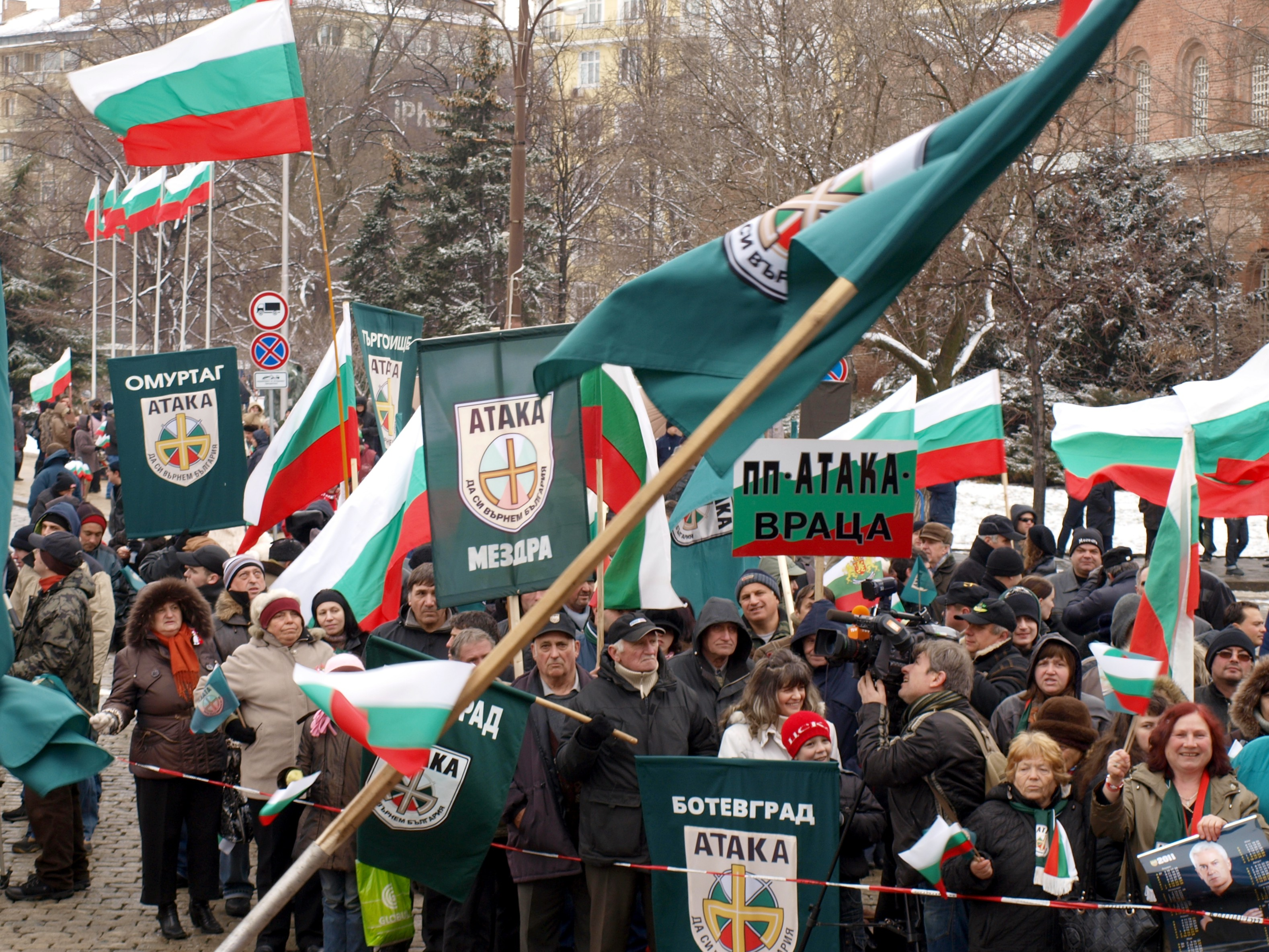
Attack rally on 3 March 2011

Attack's founder, Volen Siderov, had written many manifestos based on a groundwork of nationalism since the 1990s. His five books are dedicated to global conspiracy theories and to exposing what he calls the anti-Bulgarian policies of certain political circles in Bulgaria and abroad. According to Siderov, a small group of freemasons control the world with the help of puppet heads of state and international organizations.

Siderov started an evening show named "Attack" on Skat TV in 2003, from where he became known in the general audience and from where the party's name comes, before officially establishing the party for the parliamentary election in June 2005. Gaining a parliamentary presence for the first time in 2005, the party remained a constant opponent of the government of Sergei Stanishev (2005–2009) and carried out numerous actions against it.

On 3 March 2006, party leader Siderov called for a meeting to be held in Sofia, and around 30,000 people came to hear speeches by him and other members of the party. During this rally, Siderov declared "Bulgaria is not yet free. Bulgaria is still under Turkish rule". Party speakers protested against the ruling government in Bulgaria for forming an alliance with the Movement for Rights and Freedoms and allegedly ignoring ethnic Bulgarian interests. Earlier in 2006, Siderov organized a petition against a decision by the Bulgarian government to set up US military bases in Bulgaria.

In 2006, Siderov was second in the presidential election according to the exit polls. According to Siderov himself, the elections had been rigged. He claimed that the Bulgarian mafia reappointed Parvanov for a second term, and that there had been numerous violations in the voting process, that the Movement for Rights and Freedoms electorate had made numerous documented unpunished violations, including double voting and discriminatory repressive media pressure. This last referred to the lack of any television debate between Parvanov and Siderov. Skat TV – a broadcaster broadly sympathetic to Attack's position – has been dropped from some cable TV providers in Bulgaria. Attack claims this is a pre-election trick by the government, in order to silence one of its main competitors in the election; however, Clive Leviev-Sawyer, a Bulgarian Jewish journalist, cites "consumer complaints and hate speech" as the reasons for the channel being dropped by some providers. After personal conflict between Siderov and the owner of Skat TV, Valeri Simeonov, the owner of Skat TV left Attack and created his own new party – National Front for the Salvation of Bulgaria— and will be a competitor of Siderov for the nationalist electorate in the parliamentary election. Attack has its own television program – alfa TV, but its broadcasting is limited only to some digital suppliers. The party contends that there is a blackout against them by the "anti" Bulgarian media, because the major Bulgarian television programmes, such as bTV, Nova TV and TV7 are corrupted and fraudulent.

On 3 March 2009, Attack organized a rally, attended by about 10,000, to celebrate the liberation of Bulgaria from "500 years of enslavement by the Ottomans". Some political formations in Bulgaria have avoided contact and debate with the party – the party claim this is because "[they have] been scared from being involved in any debates with Attack, as they know they would never win".

At the 2009 parliamentary election, Attack gained 21 seats, but later 11 left the party to become independent deputies, and the party remained at the minimum with 10 deputies. Siderov claims that the cabinet's leader Boyko Borisov bought his 11 deputies. Following the 2009 election, Borisov offered to implement some of Attack's proposals such as the referendum they had proposed against the Turkish-language news on BNT. Attack agreed to support the cabinet of the new party without demanding any ministerial posts, but when later the government declared against fulfilling Attack's proposals, Attack joined the opposition. Siderov has stated that the owner of SKAT TV, Valeri Simeonov, advised him to support the government of Borisov. Attack has accused Borisov's party and previous governments of being pawns of the oligarchy, only implementing directives and orders to the Turkish, American, Israeli and other sides and involving Bulgaria in a war in Syria.

In 2011, Attack and less demonstratively also the Bulgarian Socialist Party accused Borisov's party of buying and falsifying the elections. They have also claimed that Borisov has prepared election fraud in the 2013 parliamentary election. Attack proposed introducing scanners and cameras in the polls, a proposal rejected by Borisov.

In 2012, Attack started a process for consolidation and future electoral cooperation of all nationalist forces on the Bulgarian political landscape, including IMRO – Bulgarian National Movement, the Union of Patriotic Forces etc. On 3 March 2012, the party presented the economic nationalist plan "Siderov – Bulgaria's new way". The plan demands a radical increase of the minimum wage and the breakup of what it calls the 'colonial' neoliberal economic model through immediate termination of gold mining concessions, nationalization of the electricity distribution companies, fight against corruption and programs in support of the small and medium-sized businesses. The plan also advocates removal of the flat tax and development of a progressive tax system. The minimum pension and salary in Bulgaria are below 100 euro and the lowest in the European Union. Attack proposes increasing the minimum pension to 250 euro and the salary to 500. Siderov has accused Borisov's party of hindering the people from living as Europeans even though Borisov's party is named Citizens for European Development of Bulgaria, and of treating the Bulgarian people as worth ten times less than for example Germans.

According to Volen Siderov, the number of brutal murders is increasing, most of them committed by what he calls "Gypsy bandits and marauders". The party has denied being racist or xenophobic. Attack opposes the Movement for Rights and Freedoms, claiming that it is part of political mafia and that their leader, Ahmed Dogan, derides Bulgarian parliamentarism. The peak of the conflict between Attack and the Movement came in 2012, when the majority of the Movement in the town council of the ethnically-mixed city of Kardzhali refused to make General Vasil Delov an honorary citizen and said that the Balkan Wars were ethnic cleansing. Siderov attempted to get parliament to judge Dogan for his "perverse disrespect" in challenging the liberation of Bulgaria. All other parliamentary groups abstained in the following vote, except the Movement for Rights and Freedoms, which voted against. Following this, Attack are attempting to proceed to the constitutional court for elimination of the Movement for Rights and Freedoms, but for this they need signatures of 48 deputies from the parliament. A little later, Siderov proposed to the constitutional court that Kardzhali, named after the Ottoman Turkish soldier Kardzha Ali, be renamed "Delovgrad", after Vasil Delov, liberator of the city from Ottoman Turkish rule, and renaming the highest Musala Peak to "Saint John of Rila Peak", because its name is Muslim from the Ottoman Rule.

Attack supports nuclear power in Bulgaria and as such it opposes the closing of blocks in the Kozloduy Nuclear Power Plant and supports a second nuclear power plant of Belene. Attack supported the Bulgarian Orthodox Church against the 2012 Sofia Pride gay parade and protested in the previous ones, organizing an anti-gay parade with newlyweds at the front.

== International relations ==
Its 3 MEPs participated in the short-lived Identity, Tradition, Sovereignty group (2007), which was a political group in the European Parliament composed of 23 members from European parties variously described as right-wing and nationalist.

Siderov reportedly espouses anti-Masonic conspiracy theories, claiming that Masons control the world through puppet regimes, international organizations, and the press. According to Siderov, these forces seek to commit genocide against Bulgarian people. Attack opposes NATO the membership, claiming that, despite Minister of Foreign Affairs Solomon Pasi's assurances that Bulgaria would be the safest place in Europe, the reduction in strength of the Bulgarian army to 20,000 made the nation defenseless, serving Turkish interests. Siderov compared the accession of Bulgaria to NATO as a new signing of the Treaty of Neuilly-sur-Seine, considered as humiliating treaty for Bulgaria, signed after World War I. Although the party is ambivalent on Bulgaria's European Union membership, it has demanded a revision of some of the previous agreements (e.g. the resolution on shutting down the Kozloduy Nuclear Power Plant near the Danube), it claims that those who signed the EU membership, referring to Meglena Kuneva and others, are national traitors, not because of the EU membership itself, but because of the "anti-Bulgarian" agreements, on which it is signed. Siderov expressed respect to the Russian president Vladimir Putin, by visiting him on foot for his 60th birthday on 7 October 2012. On 8 March 2013 Siderov paid tribute to the deceased president of Venezuela Hugo Chavez at the Bolivarian republic's embassy in Sofia, where he called the deceased president an 'example for the Bulgarian patriots as a statesman'.

Attack claims that the Turkish government has a hidden plan for a "new colonization" of the Balkan region, accusing them of erecting over a thousand mosques in the last 20 years in Bulgaria and with further plans of colonization. Bulgaria is currently the country with the most mosques in Europe per capita. Attack asked from the Turkish Prime Minister, Recep Tayyip Erdoğan $10 billion for the massacres and displacement of Thracian Bulgarians in 1913 and once, members of the party entered the parliament wearing shirts on which was written "Erdoğan, you owe us $10 billion"; another time with an inscription "ATTACK says: No to Turkey in the EU", Siderov on numerous occasions accused Turkey of genocide. Borisov's government expressed full support for the accession of Turkey to the European Union, while Attack boycotted this and insisted on a national referendum on the matter.

Attack insists on the cancellation of Treaty of Neuilly-sur-Seine and the returning of the Western Outlands to Bulgaria, annexed by Yugoslavia after the First World War, which consists of the regions of Dimitrovgrad and Bosilegrad in Serbia, whose population according to the Serbian national census is predominantly ethnic Bulgarian, and of the region of Strumica in Republic of Macedonia. Siderov said that the treaty is invalid, because it was signed with Yugoslavia in 1919, a vanished state, and does not refer to the present-day Serbia or to the Republic of Macedonia and should be cancelled.

The first statement ever of Volen Siderov from the parliamentary tribune, for a plan for a giant genocide of the Bulgarian nation, coming from abroad:

In this 8-year period gigantic genocide was carried out over the Bulgarian nation. At the insistence of foreign, hostile to Bulgaria factors, of our people is projected to remain 3.5 to 4 million residents. This is Bulgarophobe's plan and this plan is realised in front of us. If someone asks how, I will show him: when the right of the Bulgarians to be masters in their own country became stolen, when they will be left to die in misery and lack of medicines and medical services, by being subjected to terror by Gypsy bands, who everyday [sic?] disrupt, rob, rape and maltreat the Bulgarian nation, after which nobody deliberately seeks out the crimes, committed by them, because this is the directive outside, not to investigate the crimes of these minority groups. The goal is for the Bulgarians to live in fear, to be discouraged, crushed, submissive. Hundreds of thousands of chronically ill are dying right now because mob companies of the previous cabinet make dirty deals with the life and health of the Bulgarians. Because relatives of the previous Minister of Environment are trading with medicaments for cancer and therefore there are not any medicaments, and hundreds of thousands of Bulgarians with cancer face a slow, excruciating agony."

In September 2018, Siderov apologised for his previous anti-Semitic rhetoric during a private meeting with Israeli Likud politician Oren Hazan.

== Election results ==
Following the Bulgarian parliamentary election in 2005, the party entered the 240-seater parliament with 21 seats and 8.1% of the vote (296,848 votes) and became the fourth largest party. At the 2006 Bulgarian presidential election, the leader of the party – Volen Siderov came second behind the incumbent president Parvanov by winning 21.5% of the vote (597,175 votes) and in the subsequent runoff between the two Siderov failed to defeat the president, having received 24.0% of the vote (649,387 votes). At the 2007 European Parliament election, the party won 3 seats and 14.2% of the vote (275,237 votes) out of 18 seats, given for Bulgarian parties.

At the parliamentary election in 2009, it remained with 21 seats and increased to 9.4% of the vote (395,707 votes). Later 11 members from the parliamentary group left and became independents and the deputies of the party decreased to 10. At the 2009 European Parliament election, it decreased to 12.0% of the vote (308,052 votes) and its seats decreased to 2. The two MEPs, which entered with the votes of the party – Dimitar Stoyanov and Slavcho Binev, left the party, the last one even founded his own new party – People for Real, Open and United Democracy (PROUD). At the 2011 presidential election, Siderov was fourth by winning 122,466 votes and 3.6% of the vote, thus not qualifying for the runoff. At the parliamentary election in 2013, the party increased its seats to 23 with 7% of the vote – making it the fourth largest party. However, the 2014 elections saw the party reduced to 11 seats.

For the 2017 election, the party joined the United Patriots electoral alliance with the IMRO – Bulgarian National Movement and the National Front for the Salvation of Bulgaria (NFSB). The alliance placed third and won 27 seats.

In the 2021 parliamentary elections the Ataka party and the two remaining parties from the former alliance contested separately (NFSB together with Volya) the elections and neither of them succeeded to secure a single seat. If not for that the coalition could have managed the electoral threshold, based on their results.

=== National Assembly ===
Election	Leader	Votes	%	Seats	+/–	Status
2005	Volen Siderov	296,848	8.14 (#4)	21 / 240	New	Opposition
2009	Volen Siderov	395,733	9.36 (#4)	21 / 240	0	Support (2009)
2009	Volen Siderov	395,733	9.36 (#4)	21 / 240	0	Opposition (2009–2013)
2013	Volen Siderov	258,481	7.30 (#4)	23 / 240	▲2	Opposition
2014	Volen Siderov	148,262	4.52 (#7)	11 / 240	▼12	Opposition
2017 (Note: Run as part of the United Patriots coalition.)	Volen Siderov	318,513	9.07 (#3)	7 / 240	▼4	Coalition (2017–2019)
2017	Volen Siderov	318,513	9.07 (#3)	7 / 240	▼4	Opposition (2019–2021)
Apr 2021	Volen Siderov	15,659	0.48 (#13)	0 / 240	▼7	Extra-parliamentary
Jul 2021	Volen Siderov	12,585	0.45 (#10)	0 / 240	0	Extra-parliamentary
Nov 2021	Volen Siderov	12,153	0.46 (#11)	0 / 240	0	Extra-parliamentary
2022	Volen Siderov	7,593	0.29 (#13)	0 / 240	0	Extra-parliamentary
2023 (Note: Run as part of the Neutral Bulgaria coalition.)	Volen Siderov	10,505	0.40 (#9)	0 / 240	0	Extra-parliamentary
Jun 2024	Did not contest			0 / 240	0	Extra-parliamentary
Oct 2024	Volen Siderov	3,965	0.16 (#17)	0 / 240	0	Extra-parliamentary

=== President of Bulgaria ===
Election	Candidate	First round			Second round		
Election	Candidate	Votes	%	Rank	Votes	%	Result
2006	Volen Siderov	597,175	21.49	2nd	649,387	24.05	Lost
2011	Volen Siderov	122,466	3.64	4th	—N/a		Lost
2016	Krasimir Karakachanov	573,016	14.97	3rd	—N/a		Lost
2021	Volen Siderov	14,790	0.55	7th	—N/a		Lost
2026	Volen Siderov	4,047	0.27	12th	—N/a		Lost

=== European Parliament ===
Election	Party leader	Performance					Rank	EP Group
Election	Party leader	Votes	%	± pp	Seats	+/–	Rank	EP Group
2007	Dimitar Stoyanov	275,237	14.20%	New	3 / 18	New	4th	ITS→NI
2009	Volen Siderov	308,052	11.96%	▼2.24	2 / 17	▼1	4th	NI
2014	Volen Siderov	66,210	2.96%	▼9.00	0 / 17	▼2	▼8th	–
2019	Volen Siderov	20,906	1.04%	▼1.92	0 / 8	0	▼9th	–
