= Metin Kazak =

Bulgarian-Turkish politician

Metin Kazak (Bulgarian: Метин Казак; born 29 July 1972) is a Bulgarian-Turkish politician and former Member of the European Parliament (MEP).

== Biography ==
Kazak is a member of Movement for Rights and Freedoms. He was first elected to the European Parliament in 2007, and re-elected in 2009.

In 1997, he attained a master's degree in international and European law from Université de Bourgogne, Dijon, France.
