= Rumiana Jeleva =

Bulgarian politician

- Румяна Желева
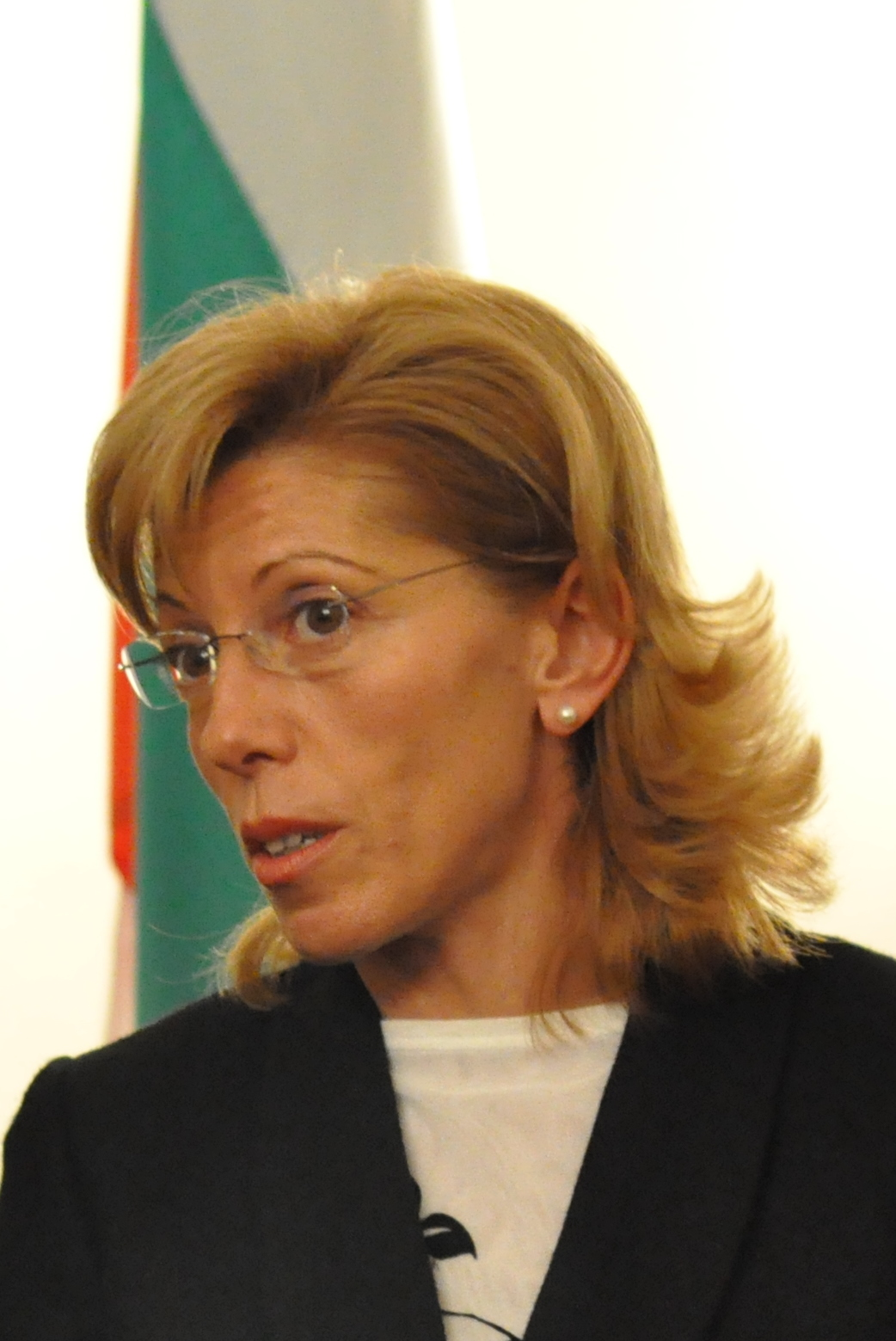
- Jeleva in 2009

Minister of Foreign Affairs
- In office 27 July 2009 – 27 January 2010
- Prime Minister: Boyko Borisov
- Preceded by: Ivailo Kalfin
- Succeeded by: Nickolay Mladenov

Personal details
- Born: 18 April 1969 (age 57) Nova Zagora, Bulgaria
- Party: Citizens for European Development of Bulgaria
- Education: Sofia University; Magdeburg University

Rumiana Ruseva Jeleva (Bulgarian: Румяна Русева Желева; born 18 April 1969) was Bulgaria's minister of foreign affairs (July 2009 – January 2010), the third woman to hold this office after Irina Bokova and Nadezhda Mihailova. Jeleva was a key figure in the "GERB" political party which won the 2009 parliamentary elections. From 2007 to 2009, she served as Member of the European Parliament (MEP) and headed the Bulgarian delegation in the EPP Group. She was nominated by Prime Minister Boyko Borisov as Commissioner in the "Barroso II Commission" and was affiliated with the European People's Party (EPP). However, an article in the German newspaper Die Welt accused her husband of links with the Russian mafia.

Jeleva holds a B.A. in sociology from the University of Sofia (1995) and a PhD in sociology from Otto von Guericke University of Magdeburg (2003).

== Pronunciation ==
The Bulgarian pronunciation of the name Jeleva is [ˈʒɛlɛvɐ], with the [ʒ]-sound of English pleasure (voiced palato-alveolar fricative). According to the current official standards for the Romanization of Bulgarian, her name should be transliterated as "Zheleva". Because of this confusion, some people erroneously pronounce the name with a y-sound, [j].

== Failure in EC hearings and end of political career ==
Jeleva was Bulgaria's nominee for European Commissioner for International Cooperation, Humanitarian Aid and Crisis Response. During her January 2010 confirmation hearing, she repeatedly failed to answer questions regarding allegations over her financial interests. She also failed to demonstrate sufficient competence in the areas she was to oversee. Her defensive and seemingly arrogant attitude and her poor language skills further jeopardized her candidacy. Facing a storm of disapproval at home, on 19 January 2010, Jeleva sent a letter of resignation to Bulgarian Prime Minister Boyko Borisov, stepping down as both commissioner-designate and Minister of Foreign Affairs, and putting an end to her political career. She was replaced as commissioner-designate by Kristalina Georgieva and as Minister of Foreign Affairs by Nickolay Mladenov.

== See also ==
- List of foreign ministers in 2010
- Foreign relations of Bulgaria
- List of Bulgarians

Political offices
Preceded by Ivaylo Kalfin	Minister of Foreign Affairs; 2009–2010	Succeeded by Nickolay Mladenov
