= Evgeni Kirilov =

Bulgarian politician

Evgeni Zahariev Kirilov (Bulgarian: Евгени Захариев Кирилов) (born 26 January 1945 in Lubichevo, Targovishte Oblast) is a Bulgarian politician. He is a member of the Coalition for Bulgaria, part of the Party of European Socialists, and became a Member of the European Parliament (MEP) on 1 January 2007 with the accession of Bulgaria to the European Union. He was a member of the National Assembly of the Republic of Bulgaria, mainly active in the committee on foreign affairs.

On May 20, 2010, the European Parliament in Strasbourg, adopted the resolution on "The need for an EU Strategy for the South Caucasus" on the basis of the report by Evgeni Kirilov. The resolution states in particular, that "the occupied Azerbaijani regions around Nagorno-Karabakh must be cleared as soon as possible".
