= Marusya Ivanova Lyubcheva =

Bulgarian politician

- Маруся Иванова Любчева

Member of the European Parliament
- In office 1 January 2007/7 June 2013 – 13 July 2009/30 June 2014
- Constituency: Bulgaria

Personal details
- Born: 20 July 1949 (age 76) s. Mitrovtsi, People's Republic of Bulgaria
- Party: Bulgarian Socialist Party
- Occupation: Politician

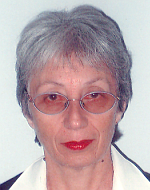
Marusya Ivanova Lyubcheva

Marusya Ivanova Luybcheva (Bulgarian: Маруся Иванова Любчева; born 20 July 1949, in Mitrovtsi, Montana district) is a Bulgarian politician who served as a Member of the European Parliament from 2007 until 2009 and from 2013 until 2014. She is a member of the Coalition for Bulgaria, part of the Party of European Socialists.

== Political career ==
Luybcheva became a member of the European Parliament on 1 January 2007 with the accession of Bulgaria to the European Union. During her time in parliament, she served on the Committee on International Trade (2007–2009), the Committee on Budgetary Control (2007–2009) and the Committee on Foreign Affairs (2013–2014). She was a substitute for the Committee on Budgets and for the Committee on Women's Rights and Gender Equality.

In addition to her committee assignments, Lyubcheva was a member of the parliament's delegations to the EU-Kazakhstan, EU-Kyrgyzstan and EU-Uzbekistan Parliamentary Cooperation Committees, and for relations with Tajikistan, Turkmenistan and Mongolia. She was also a substitute member of the delegation to the EU-Ukraine Parliamentary Cooperation Committee.
