= Vladko Panayotov =

Vladko Panayotov (Bulgarian: Владко Тодоров Панайотов; born 7 May 1950 in Pavlikeni) is a scholar and Bulgarian member of the European Parliament who sits on the committee for the Environment, Public Health and Food Safety. He is also a substitute for the Committee on Industry, Research and Energy. He is a member of the Movement for Rights and Freedoms party of Bulgaria and in the European Union he is part of the Group of the Alliance of Liberals and Democrats for Europe.

== Early life ==
Prof. Vladko Panayotov was educated in Moscow and Sofia, and holds a Ph.D. His areas of study include mineral processing and chemical cybernetics. In 1975, he worked as an Engineer at the Central Institute on Complex Automatics in Sofia. Between 1975 and 1977 he carried out regular military service.

== Inventions ==
Panayotov created an environmentally friendly technology which extracts non-ferrous metals from industrial waste (including copper, nickel and aluminum). This technology avoids the use of cyanides, acids and over non-environmentally friendly materials and reduces the amount of industrial waste produced.

== Publications ==
Panayotov has published over 160 works including 26 inventions, 5 monographs (in Bulgarian and in English) and 4 textbooks.
