= Filiz Hyusmenova =

Bulgarian politician

- Филиз Хюсменова
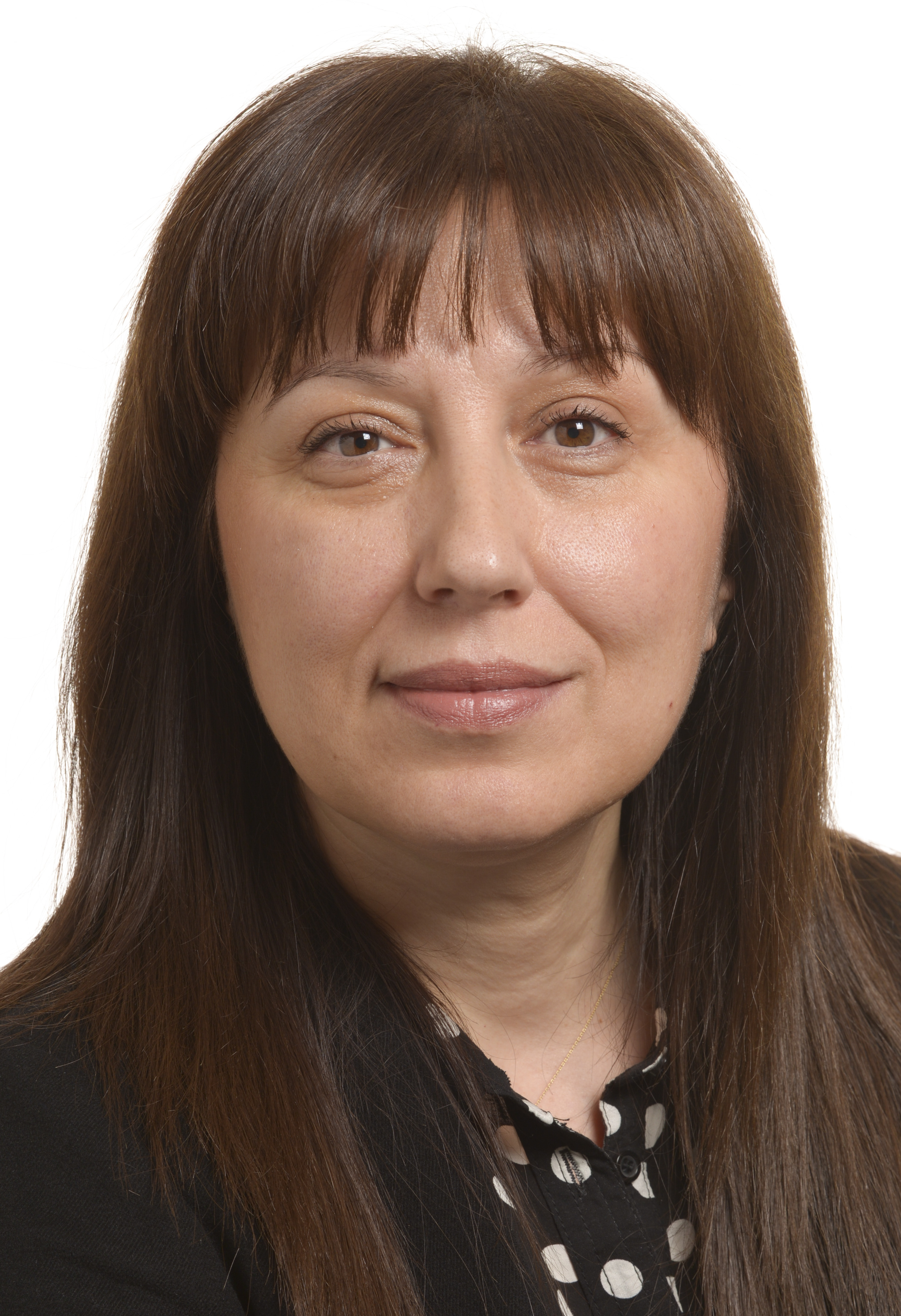

Member of the European Parliament for Bulgaria
- In office 1 January 2007 – 26 May 2019
- Preceded by: Constituency established
- Succeeded by: Mustafa Karadayi

Personal details
- Born: 10 June 1966 (age 60) Silistra, Bulgaria
- Party: Movement for Rights and Freedoms (DPS)
- Education: Veliko Tarnovo University
- Profession: Politician

Filiz Hakaeva Hyusmenova (Bulgarian: Филиз Хакъева Хюсменова; born 10 June 1966 in Silistra, Bulgaria) is a Bulgarian politician of Bulgarian-Turkish descent who served as a Member of the European Parliament (MEP) from 2007 until 2019. She is a member of the Movement for Rights and Freedoms, part of the Alliance of Liberals and Democrats for Europe.

== Political career ==
=== Career in national politics ===
From 2003 until 2005, Hyusmenova served as Minister without portfolio in the government of Prime Minister Simeon Saxe-Coburg-Gotha.

=== Member of the European Parliament, 2007–2019 ===
Hyusmenova became a Member of the European Parliament on 1 January 2007 with the accession of Bulgaria to the European Union. In parliament, she served on the Committee on Regional Development (2007–2014), the Committee on Civil Liberties, Justice and Home Affairs (2014–2019) and the Committee on Women's Rights and Gender Equality (2017–2019).

In addition to her committee assignments, Hyusmenova was part of the parliament's delegations for relations to the Euronest Parliamentary Assembly (2009–2014); to the EU-Armenia, EU-Azerbaijan and EU-Georgia Parliamentary Cooperation Committees (2009–2014); and with Japan (2014–2019).

From 2014 until 2019, Hyusmenova served as a vice-chair of the Alliance of Liberals and Democrats for Europe group under the leadership of chairman Hans van Baalen.
