= Movement for Rights and Freedoms =

Bulgarian political party

Movement for Rights and Freedoms Движение за права и свободи
- Abbreviation: DPS
- Leader: Delyan Peevski
- Founder: Ahmed Dogan
- Founded: 4 January 1990
- Headquarters: 23 Vrabcha Str., Sofia
- Youth wing: Youth Movement for Rights and Freedoms
- Membership (2018): ▼40,000
- Ideology: Liberal conservatism Turkish minority interests
- Political position: Centre to centre-right
- Regional affiliation: Liberal South East European Network (2008–2024)
- European affiliation: European Conservatives and Reformists Party (since 2026) (Note: The party was formerly part of the Alliance of Liberals and Democrats for Europe Party (2005–2024) and Non-Inscrits (2024–2026).)
- European Parliament group: European Conservatives and Reformists Group (since 2026) (Note: The party was formerly part of the Alliance of Liberals and Democrats for Europe group (2007–2019), Renew Europe (2019–2024) and Non-Inscrits (2024–2026))
- International affiliation: Liberal International (2003–2024)
- Colors: Blue
- National Assembly: 21 / 240
- European Parliament: 2 / 17
- Municipalities: 48 / 265

Website
- dps.bg

The Movement for Rights and Freedoms (Bulgarian: Движение за права и свободи Dvizhenie za prava i svobodi, ДПС, DPS; Turkish: Hak ve Özgürlükler Hareketi, HÖH) is a political party in Bulgaria with a support base among ethnic minority communities. While representing the interests of Muslims, especially Turks and to a lesser extent Pomaks (Muslim Bulgarians), the party also receives the largest share of Romani votes. The party was in government in 1992–1994, 2001–2009 and 2013–2014.

== History ==
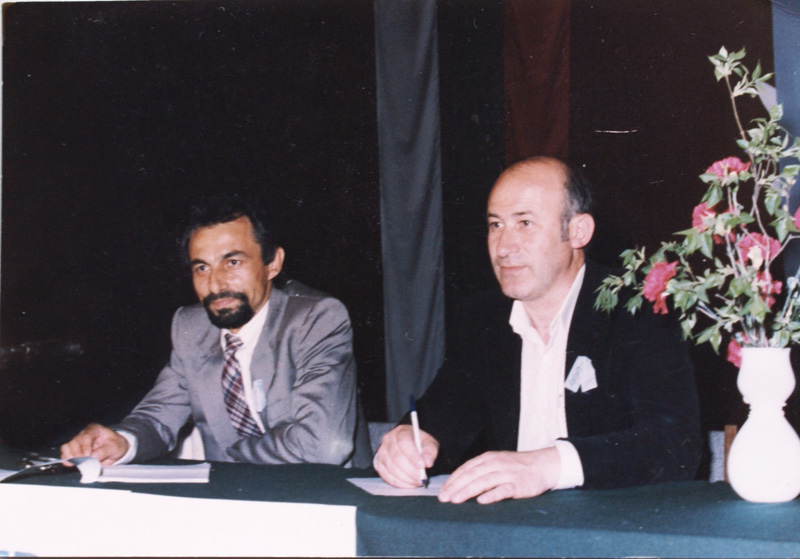
Ahmed Dogan (left) at the foundation conference

The party was founded in 1990, with Ahmed Dogan serving as its leader until 2013. He resigned following an assassination attempt and Lyutfi Mestan was elected to succeed him on 19 January 2013. Mestan was removed from power at the insistence of Dogan after declaring support for Turkey shooting down a Russian military jet in 2015. In response Turkish President Erdoğan blacklisted Dogan and banned him from entering the country. Mestan formed his own party, named DOST.

The party was led by Mustafa Karadayi from 2016 until his retirement following the 2023 local elections. Dogan, who had been chosen to serve as interim party leader, initially proposed Delyan Peevski as his successor, however following internal dissent, he endorsed both Peevski and former Environment minister Dzhevdet Chakarov for co-chairmen of the party, to which they were elected in February 2024.

In July 2024 the party split in two factions, one led by Peevski and another by Chakarov and Dogan, with both forming separate electoral coalitions ahead of the upcoming election, DPS-NN and APS respectively. In September the SAC ruled that DPS was de jure part of DPS-NN and APS changed their name and registration to exclude the party. In late 2024 both factions held conferences where they expelled the leadership of the other from the party. In 2025 the Sofia City Court ruled that Peevski's expulsion from the party and removal from leadership by the Dogan faction had not been legitimate. The case, pending appeal from the SCC, was withdrawn by Chakarov in May 2025, when he left the Dogan faction and parliamentary group and announced his reconciliation with Peevski, following legal pressure. Having been de jure expelled from the DPS, the Dogan faction reorganized APS into a separate party in late 2025.

== International affiliation ==
DPS was a member of the ALDE (since 2001), the Liberal International (since 2003) and Renew Europe. In December 2024 ALDE announced its intention to expel the party, due to the affirmation of Peevski's leadership. In response, the party left the alliance.

In April 2025, DPS joined the European Conservatives, Patriots & Affiliates group on PACE, with their MEPs expected to join a similar group in the European Parliament. In May 2025, representatives of DPS attended the CPAC Hungary 2025 event, hosted by the Hungarian organization Center for Fundamental Rights. The party joined the ECR group in July 2026.

== Election results ==
Starting in 1990 as the first political party of the Turkish minority participating in the parliamentary elections, in the first elections in 1990 after the end of the communist regime, which the Turks of the country had boycotted, the party won 6.0% of the popular vote and 24 out of 400 seats and became the fourth largest party in the parliament. In the parliamentary elections in 1991 it won 7.6% of the vote and remained with 24 seats in а 240-seater parliament. In the elections in 1994 it won 5.4% of the vote and its seats decreased to 15. In the elections in 1997 it won 7.6% of the vote and 19 out of 240 seats. From 2001 to 2009, the party was part of the government, first in a coalition with the National Movement Simeon II (NDSV) party and then with the Bulgarian Socialist Party (BSP). The party had ministers in the Sakskoburggotski Government, Stanishev Government and Oresharski Government (2013-2014).

It won in the elections in 2001 7.5% of the vote and 21 out of 240 seats. Subsequently, for the first time the party joined a coalition government, which was led by the winner of the elections (NDSV). Under the control of the party were two out of the 17 Bulgarian ministries – the Ministry of Agriculture and Forests and the Minister without portfolio, the other 15 remained under the control of senior coalition partner NDSV. At the 2005 elections it increased to 12.8% of vote and 34 out of 240 seats and was kept in power as a part of the coalition led by the Bulgarian Socialist Party (BSP) and National Movement Simeon II (NDSV) party. The ministries under the control of the Movement of Rights and Freedoms increased to three out of 18.

At the 2009 elections it increased to 14.0% of vote and 38 out of 240 seats. Following the election, the government was totally occupied by the decisive winner, the Citizens for European Development of Bulgaria (GERB) party and the Movement for Rights and Freedoms was еxcluded from the government and remained in opposition after having been part of coalition governments for the two consecutive preceding terms between 2001 and 2009. At the 2009 European Parliament elections the party won 14.1% of the vote and three MEPs out of Bulgaria's total representation of 18. Two of the MEPs are ethnic Turks (Filiz Husmenova and Metin Kazak) and one (Vladko Panayotov) is ethnic Bulgarian.

In the Bulgarian parliamentary election in 2013, the Movement for Rights and Freedoms decreased to 11.3% of the vote; it took 36 seats and remained the third biggest party. The DPS won the elections abroad with 41.3% and the most polling stations and voters in a foreign country were in Turkey.

The DPS won four MEPs in the 2014 European Parliament election.

=== National Assembly ===
Percentage of votes for MRF by electoral districts in the 2014 parliamentary elections

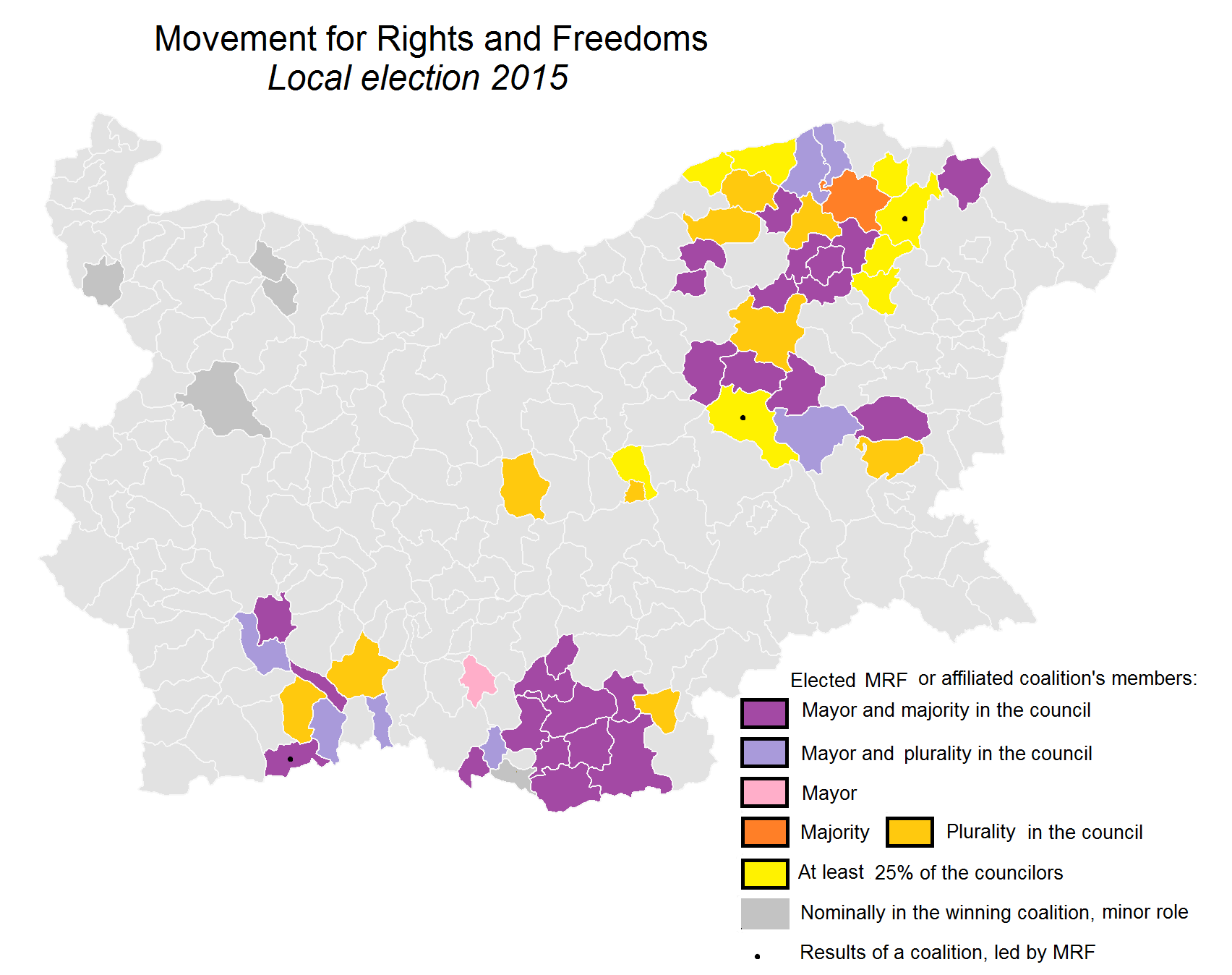
Map showing performance of MRF at the 2015 Bulgarian local elections.

Election	Leader	Votes	%	Seats	+/–	Government
1990	Ahmed Dogan	491,596	8.03 (#3)	23 / 400	▲23	Opposition
1991	Ahmed Dogan	418,168	7.6 (#3)	24 / 240	▲1	Support (1991–1992)
1991	Ahmed Dogan	418,168	7.6 (#3)	24 / 240	▲1	Coalition (1992–1994)
1994	Ahmed Dogan	283,094	5.44 (#4)	15 / 240	▼9	Opposition
1997 (Note: As Union for National Salvation.)	Ahmed Dogan	323,429	7.6 (#3)	19 / 240	▲4	Opposition
2001 (Note: As DPS-Liberal Union-Euroroma.)	Ahmed Dogan	340,395	7.45 (#4)	21 / 240	▲2	Coalition
2005	Ahmed Dogan	467,400	12.81 (#3)	34 / 240	▲13	Coalition
2009	Ahmed Dogan	610,521	14.45 (#3)	38 / 240	▲4	Opposition
2013	Lyutvi Mestan	400,466	11.31 (#3)	36 / 240	▼2	Coalition
2014	Lyutvi Mestan	487,134	14.84 (#3)	38 / 240	▲2	Opposition
2017	Mustafa Karadayi	315,976	8.99 (#4)	26 / 240	▼12	Opposition
Apr 2021	Mustafa Karadayi	336,306	10.51 (#4)	30 / 240	▲4	Snap election
Jul 2021	Mustafa Karadayi	292,514	10.71 (#5)	29 / 240	▼1	Snap election
Nov 2021	Mustafa Karadayi	340,997	12.83 (#3)	34 / 240	▲5	Opposition
2022	Mustafa Karadayi	344,625	13.76 (#3)	36 / 240	▲2	Snap election
2023	Mustafa Karadayi	347,700	13.18 (#4)	36 / 240	0	Support
Jun 2024	Delyan Peevski; Dzhevdet Chakarov	366,310	16.56 (#2)	47 / 240	▲11	Snap election
Oct 2024 (Note: As DPS-NN.)	Delyan Peevski	281,356	11.17 (#4)	29 / 240	▼18	Opposition (Jan–Mar 2025)
Oct 2024	Delyan Peevski	281,356	11.17 (#4)	29 / 240	▼18	Support (from Mar 2025)
2026	Delyan Peevski	230,693	7.01 (#4)	21 / 240	▼8	Opposition

=== Presidential ===
Election	Candidate	First round			Second round		
Election	Candidate	Votes	%	Rank	Votes	%	Result
1992	Zhelyu Zhelev	2,273,541	44.66	1st	2,738,420	52.85	Won
1996	Petar Stoyanov (Note: As part of ODS.)	1,889,825	44.07	1st	2,502,517	59.73	Won
2001	Reneta Indzhova	139,680	4.92	4th	-	-	Lost
2006	Georgi Parvanov	1,780,119	64.05	1st	2,050,488	75.95	Won
2011	-	-	-	-	-	-	Lost
2016	Plamen Oresharski	253,726	6,63	5th	-	-	Lost
2021	Mustafa Karadayi	309,681	11,57	3rd	-	-	Lost

=== European Parliament ===
Election	List leader	Votes	%	Seats	+/–	EP Group
2007	Filiz Husmenova	392,650	20.26 (#3)	4 / 18	New	ALDE
2009	Filiz Husmenova	364,197	14.14 (#3)	3 / 18	▼1	ALDE
2014	Filiz Husmenova	386,725	17.27 (#3)	4 / 17	▲1	ALDE
2019	Mustafa Karadayi	323,510	16.55 (#3)	3 / 17	▼1	RE
2024	Dzhevdet Chakarov	295,092	14.66 (#2)	3 / 17	0	RE

== Controversies ==
=== Ethnic nature ===
On 8 October 1991, ninety-three members of Bulgaria's National Assembly — virtually all of them affiliated with the former Communist Party — asked the constitutional court to declare the DPS unconstitutional citing article 11.4 of the constitution which explicitly bans political parties "formed on ethnic, racial, and religious basis". On 21 April 1992, the court rejected the petition and affirmed the constitutionality of the DPS.

Even though the DPS has been legally a part of Bulgarian political life since then, some Bulgarian nationalists, particularly the far-right National Union Attack, continue to assert that it is anti-constitutional because it consists mainly of ethnic Turks. However, the statute of the DPS states that it "is an independent public and political organization, founded with the purpose of contributing to the unity of all Bulgarian citizens".

Additionally, supporters of DPS argue that banning parties on the basis of their ethnic composition constitutes an instance of ethnic discrimination and is in contravention to European law, the Framework Convention for the Protection of National Minorities in particular to which Bulgaria is a signatory. Furthermore, despite a similar constitutional ban, religious parties, such as the Bulgarian Christian Coalition have competed for parliamentary elections since 1997, and again in 2005, without any political upheaval.

More recently, Antonina Zheliazkova, head of the Centre for Interethnic Relations in Sofia, praised Ahmed Dogan by stating that "He has been working hard to open up the party to all citizens and has encouraged the DPS's supporters to be free to vote for non-ethnic parties".

=== Other Turkish political factions ===
At present there are three other tiny Turkish political factions that oppose the DPS's politics. These groups — which united to form the Balkan Democratic League — are the Movement of the Democratic Wing (DDK), led by Osman Oktay; the Party for Democracy and Justice (PDS), led by Nedim Gencev; and the Union of the Bulgarian Turks (SBT), led by Seyhan Türkkan.

However, these movements, as well as the National Movement for Rights and Freedoms, member of a Social-Democratic coalition ('Rose coalition') failed to secure any elected representative in the parliament. A party founded in 2011 by members who left the party and headed by Korman Ismailov—People's Party Freedom and Dignity, gained 1.5% of the vote in a coalition with National Movement Simeon II (NDSV) and therefore did not cross the 4% threshold to enter the parliament. This party was part of the Reformist Bloc and crossed the threshold and entered the parliament and the government in 2014, but only with one Deputy Minister that was removed. Another political fraction DOST founded by the former leader Mestan, had 17,000 registered members in 2016, which were obtained only for about one year. If so, the members of the Movement of Rights and Freedoms must have dropped in numbers.

=== Alleged manipulation of votes ===
The DPS was severely criticized by the Bulgarian ultra-nationalist party Attack as well as mainstream right-wing political parties such as Democrats for a Strong Bulgaria (DSB) and the Union of Democratic Forces (SDS) and even by DPS coalition partners of the National Movement Simeon II for allegedly manipulating the vote in the June 2005 elections in some places by bringing Bulgarian citizens of Turkish origin living in Turkey to vote in the elections. However, allegations of ethnic Turks coming to vote in Bulgaria at their permanent address and then returning to Turkey to vote with their passports, could not be "verified or confirmed" by international observers, whose assessment on the election was that it was free and fair.

=== Opposing privatization on ethnic grounds ===
In February 2005, the DPS opposed the privatisation of Bulgaria's largest tobacco company, Bulgartabac, which was backed by the government and the European Union, on the grounds that the industry traditionally employs ethnic Turks. The resulting crisis led to the resignation of vice premier Lydia Shouleva.

=== Delyan Peevski ===
Delyan Peevski is "a highly controversial figure in Bulgarian politics, business and media." He has served several terms of office in Bulgaria's Parliament as a DPS MP. He was placed under US sanctions for corruption through the Magnitsky Act mechanism in May 2021. He even served as head of the Bulgarian State Agency for National Security for one day, "but after mass protests broke out in the streets was forced to hand in his resignation." Peevski served as MP from the parliamentary group of the DPS in the 41st, 42nd, 43rd, 44th, 47th and 48th National Assembly of Bulgaria and is currently serving as MP in the 49th National Assembly, where his legislative efforts are focused mainly on the judicial reform, Bulgaria's support for Ukraine and enforcement of the EU sanctions against Russia. On October 16, 2023, he became co-chairperson of the Parliamentary Group of DPS.

== Party chairmen ==
#	President	Birth–Death	Term start	Term end
1	Ahmed Dogan	1954–	4 January 1990	19 January 2013
2	Lyutvi Mestan	1960–	19 January 2013	24 December 2015
–	Interim Chairmanship Council (Chetin Kazak, Mustafa Karadayi, Rushen Riza)		24 December 2015	24 April 2016
3	Mustafa Karadayi	1970–	24 April 2016	7 November 2023
4	Ahmed Dogan	1954–	7 November 2023	24 February 2024
5	Dzhevdet Chakarov	1960–	24 February 2024	22 December 2024
6	Delyan Peevski	1980–	24 February 2024	Incumbent

== See also ==
- Political machine
- List of liberal parties
- Political parties of minorities
- Liberalism and radicalism in Bulgaria
- Turks in Bulgaria
