= List of members of the European Parliament for Bulgaria (2019–2024) =

This is the list of the 17 members of the European Parliament for Bulgaria in the 2019 to 2024 session. The members were elected in the 2019 European Parliament election in Bulgaria.

== List ==
| Name | National party | EP Group | Preference votes |
|---|---|---|---|
| Emil Radev | Citizens for European Development of Bulgaria (GERB) | EPP | 82 536 |
| Andrey Kovatchev | Citizens for European Development of Bulgaria (GERB) | EPP | 9 357 |
| Andrey Novakov | Citizens for European Development of Bulgaria (GERB) | EPP | 9 218 |
| Eva Maydell | Citizens for European Development of Bulgaria (GERB) | EPP | 7 432 |
| Asim Ademov | Citizens for European Development of Bulgaria (GERB) | EPP | 7 220 |
| Alexander Yordanov | Union of Democratic Forces (SDS) | EPP | 13 752 |
| Elena Yoncheva | Bulgarian Socialist Party (BSP) | S&D | 82 009 |
| Sergei Stanishev | Bulgarian Socialist Party (BSP) | S&D | 30 268 |
| Petar Vitanov | Bulgarian Socialist Party (BSP) | S&D | 3 601 |
| Tsvetelina Penkova | Bulgarian Socialist Party (BSP) | S&D | 2 670 |
| Ivo Hristov | Bulgarian Socialist Party (BSP) | S&D | 13 958 |
| Iskra Mihaylova | Movement for Rights and Freedoms (DPS) | ALDE | 12 007 |
| Atidzhe Alieva-Veli | Movement for Rights and Freedoms (DPS) | ALDE | 6 306 |
| Ilhan Kyuchyuk | Movement for Rights and Freedoms (DPS) | ALDE | 4 377 |
| Angel Dzhambazki | IMRO – Bulgarian National Movement (IMRO-BND) | ERC | 49 109 |
| Andrei Slabakov | IMRO – Bulgarian National Movement (IMRO-BND) | ERC | 9 425 |
| Radan Kanev | Democrats for a Strong Bulgaria (DSB) | EPP | 34 735 |

Source: "РЕЗУЛТАТИ ОТ ИЗБОРИ ЗА ЧЛЕНОВЕ НА ЕВРОПЕЙСКИ ПАРЛАМЕНТ | 26 МАЙ 2019". results.cik.bg. Central Election Commission.
