= 2024 European Parliament election in Bulgaria =

- 9 June 2024

All 17 Bulgarian seats in the European Parliament
- Turnout: ▲33.78%
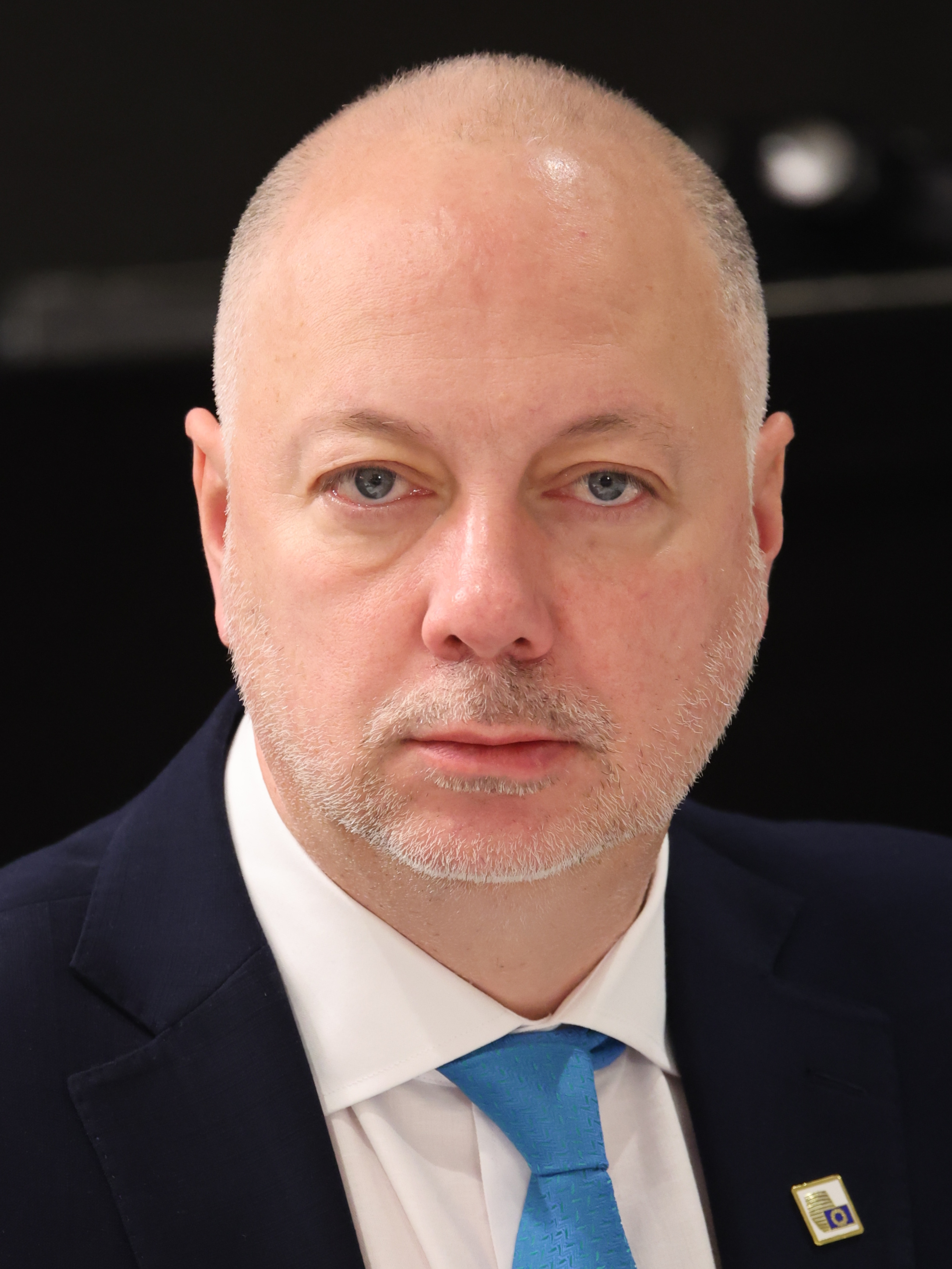

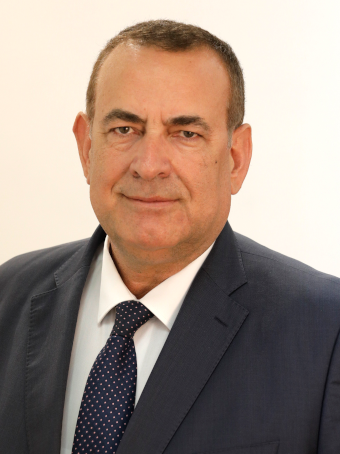

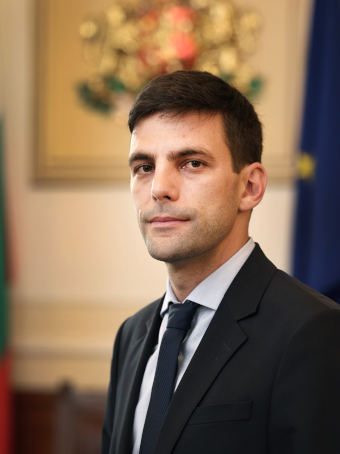

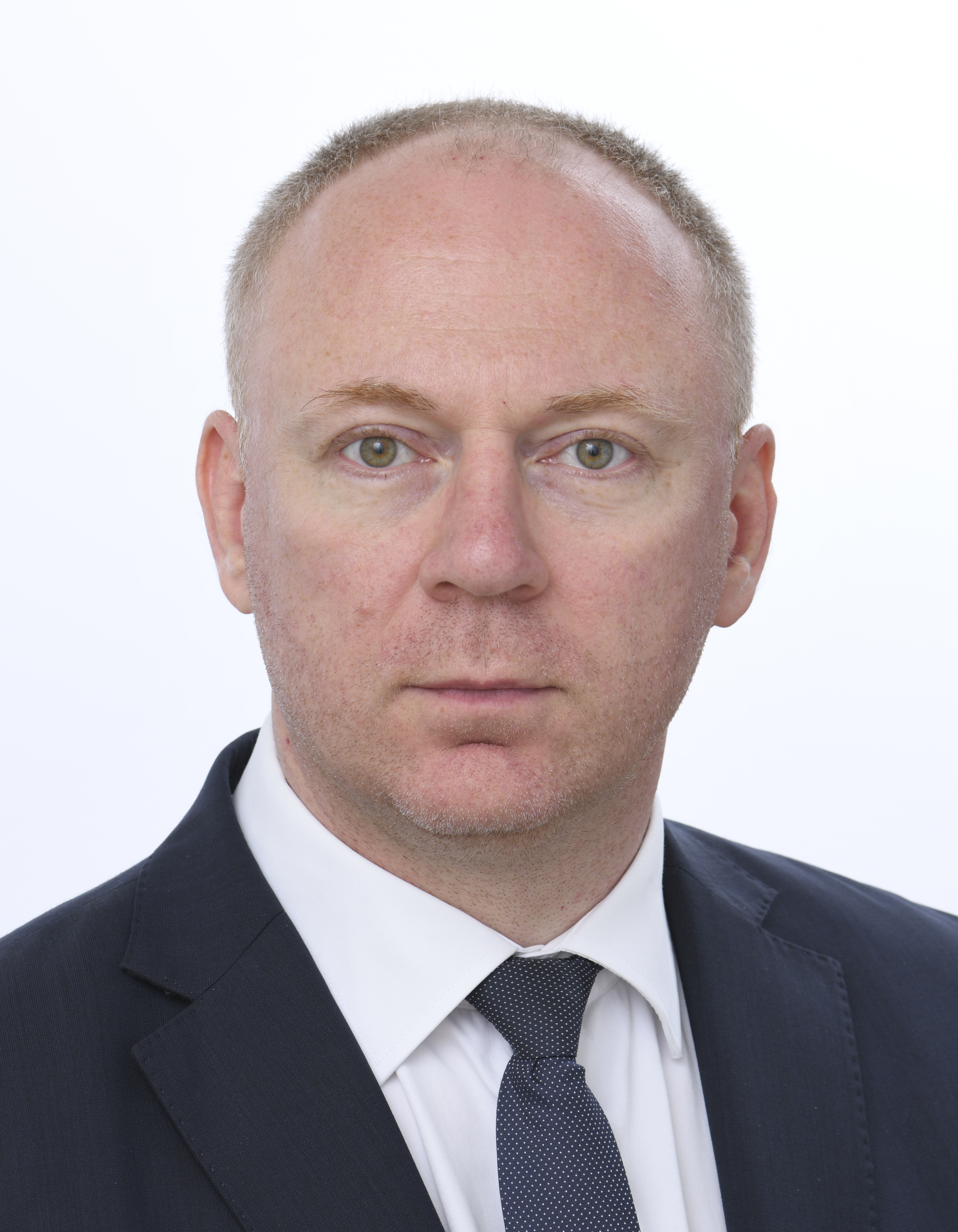

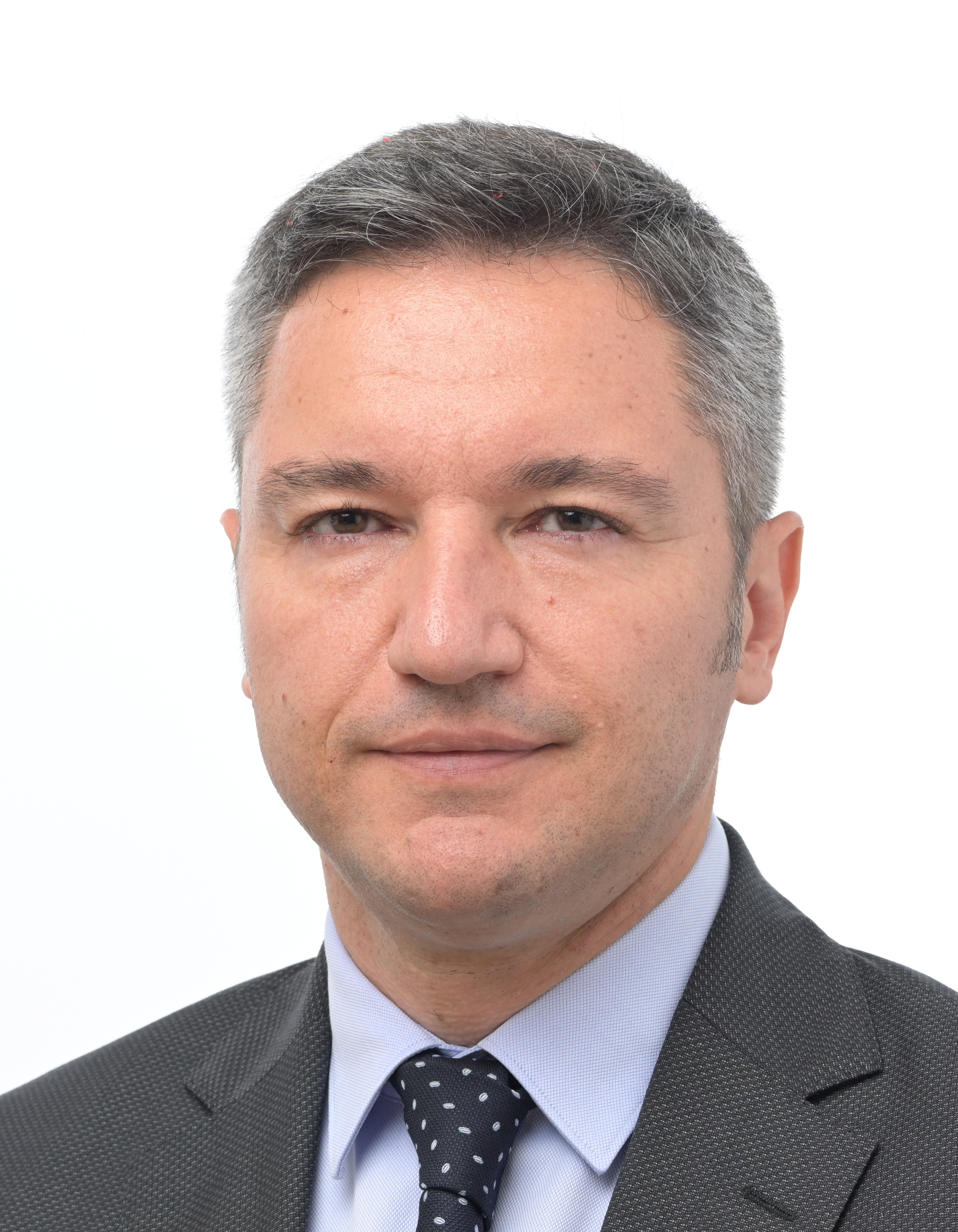

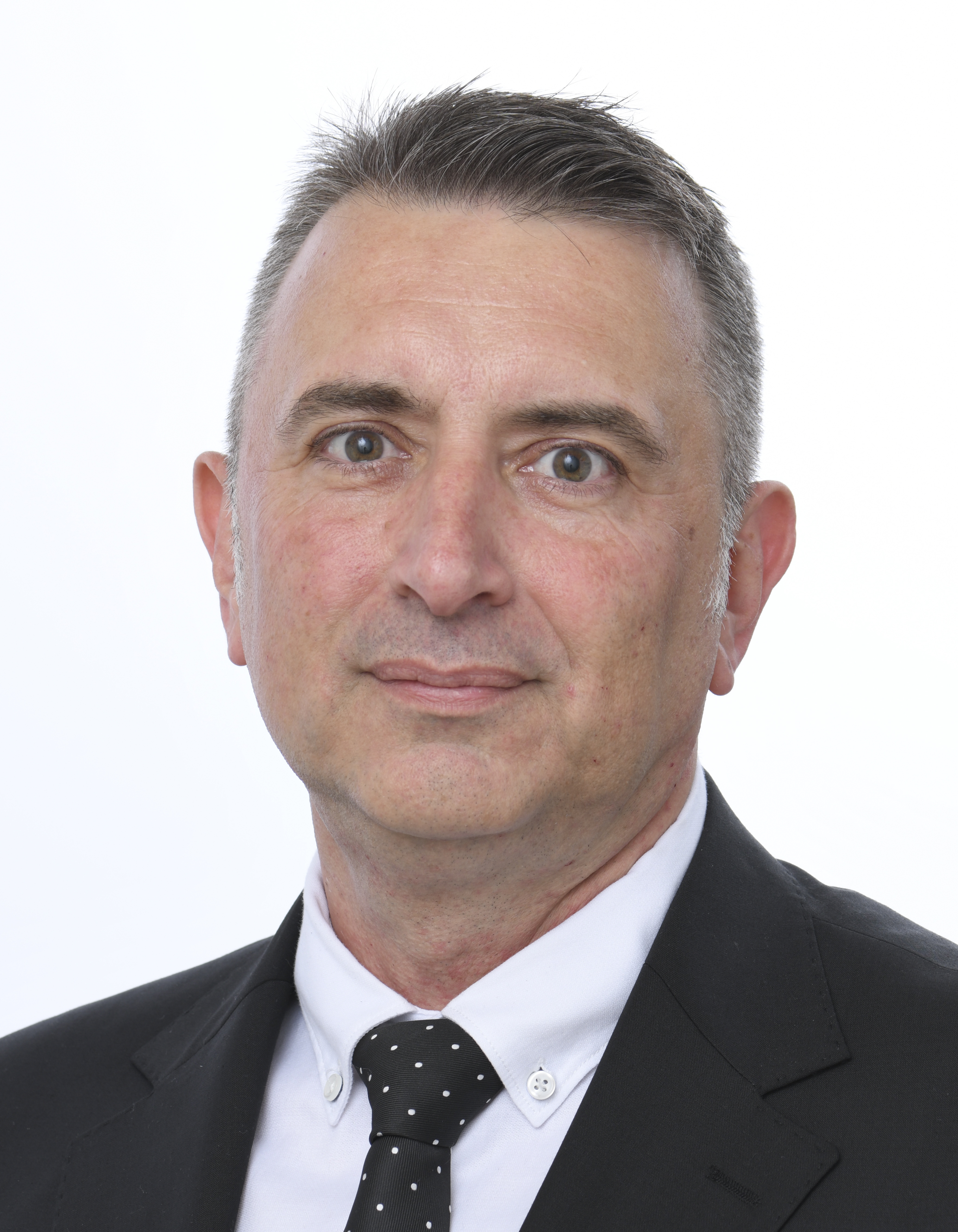
	First party	Second party	Third party
Leader	Rosen Zhelyazkov	Dzhevdet Chakarov	Nikola Minchev
Party	GERB–SDS	DPS	PP–DB
Alliance	EPP	Renew	Renew-EPP (Note: PP–DB is an electoral alliance which includes parties with different European affiliations. PP had expressed interest in joining Renew Europe prior to the election, while DB, which itself is an alliance of two parties, features the DSB party, a member of the EPP. Additionally, DaB!, the other member of DB, had also applied for EPP membership prior to the election. The PP–DB alliance ran united at the election but its elected MEPs were seated in different parliamentary groups.)
Last election	6 seats, 30.40%	3 seats, 16.55%	1 seat, 6.45%
Seats won	5	3	3
Seat change	▼1	Steady	▲2
Popular vote	474,059	295,092	290,865
Percentage	23.55%	14.66%	14.45%
Swing	▼6.85%	▼1.89%	▲8.00%
	Fourth party	Fifth party	Sixth party
Leader	Stanislav Stoyanov	Kristian Vigenin	Ivaylo Vulchev
Party	Revival	BSP	ITN
Alliance	ESN	S&D	ECR (Note: ITN, despite not being a member of the ECR party, had repeatedly reaffirmed its intention to join the ECR Group throughout the election campaign. Its elected MEP Ivaylo Valchev was granted a spot in the group following the election results.)
Last election	0 seats, 1.04%	5 seats, 24.26%	—
Seats won	3	2	1
Seat change	▲3	▼3	New
Popular vote	281,434	141,178	121,572
Percentage	13.98%	7.01%	6.04%
Swing	▲12.94%	▼17.25%	New
- Results by national constituency

The 2024 European Parliament election in Bulgaria was held on 9 June 2024 as part of the 2024 European Parliament election. This was the country’s fifth parliamentary election since its accession to the EU in 2007, and the first to take place after Brexit. Bulgaria also held a separate national parliamentary election that day.

== Electoral system ==
The 17 members are elected through a system of semi-open lists and proportional representation in a single nationwide constituency with seats allocated through largest remainder method. The threshold is the number of valid votes divided by the number of members of the European parliament from Bulgaria, which is roughly 5.9%.

All people who have Bulgarian citizenship and a main residence in Bulgarian, Bulgarian citizens without residence in Bulgaria (Bulgarians abroad) and other Union citizens if their main residence is in Bulgaria are entitled to vote in the European elections in Bulgaria. In addition, those eligible to vote must turn 18 years old by election day at the latest and be registered in the voter register/European voter register of a local Bulgarian administration on the deadline date. Voting is compulsory for Bulgarian citizens but the obligation is not enforced and no penalties are envisaged for those who don't vote.

== Outgoing delegation ==
The table shows the detailed composition of the Bulgarian seats at the European Parliament as of 24 January 2024.

EP Group	Seats	Party	Seats	MEPs
European People's Party	7 / 17	Citizens for European Development of Bulgaria	5	Asim Ademov; Andrey Kovatchev; Eva Maydell; Andrey Novakov; Emil Radev
European People's Party	7 / 17	Union of Democratic Forces	1	Alexander Yordanov
European People's Party	7 / 17	Democrats for a Strong Bulgaria	1	Radan Kanev
Progressive Alliance of Socialists and Democrats	5 / 17	Bulgarian Socialist Party	5	Ivo Hristov; Tsvetelina Penkova; Sergei Stanishev; Petar Vitanov; Elena Yoncheva
Renew Europe	3 / 17	Movement for Rights and Freedoms	3	Atidzhe Alieva-Veli; Ilhan Kyuchyuk; Iskra Mihaylova
European Conservatives and Reformists	2 / 17	VMRO – Bulgarian National Movement	2	Angel Dzhambazki; Andrei Slabakov
Total			17	
Source: European Parliament

=== MEPs not standing for re-election ===
Name	Party	Date announced	Source
Petar Vitanov	PES-affiliated independent politician (ex BSP member)	24 April 2024	
Ivo Hristov	BSP	29 April 2024	
Sergey Stanishev	BSP	30 April 2024	
Aleksandar Yordanov	SDS	7 May 2024	
Atidzhe Alieva-Veli	DPS	7 May 2024	

== Running parties ==
=== Contesting parties and coalitions ===
Below is the official list of parties and coalitions that registered lists for the European Parliamentary elections.

#	Party or coalition		Ideology	Lead Candidate	2019 result	
#	Party or coalition		Ideology	Lead Candidate	Votes (%)	Seats
1	There is Such a People		Right-wing populism	Ivaylo Vulchev	Did not exist	
2	Peoples Voice		Right-wing populism	Svetoslav Vitkov	0.31%	0 / 17
3	Blue Bulgaria	National Movement for Stability and Progress	Liberalism	Tsveta Kirilova	1.09% (Note: Results with New Time Party.)	0 / 17
3	Blue Bulgaria	Conservative Union of the Right	National conservatism Anti-communism	Tsveta Kirilova	DNP	
3	Blue Bulgaria	Bulgarian Democratic Forum	National conservatism Anti-communism	Tsveta Kirilova	DNP	
3	Blue Bulgaria	Movement for Democratic Action-DZ	Liberal conservatism	Tsveta Kirilova	DNP	
3	Blue Bulgaria	Bulgaria for Citizens Movement	Liberalism	Tsveta Kirilova	DNP	
3	Blue Bulgaria	Conservative Bulgaria	National conservatism	Tsveta Kirilova	1.15%	0 / 17
3	Blue Bulgaria	Radical-Democratic Party	Social conservatism Anti-communism	Tsveta Kirilova	Rise	
3	Blue Bulgaria	Bulgarian New Democracy	Liberal conservatism	Tsveta Kirilova	DNP	
3	Blue Bulgaria	Agrarian People's Union	Agrarianism; Conservatism	Tsveta Kirilova	DNP	
4	We Citizens	Bulgarian Spring	Left-wing nationalism	Plamen Paskov	DNP	
4	We Citizens	Bulgarian Workers-Peasant Party	Marxism-Leninism	Plamen Paskov	DNP	
4	We Citizens	Competence, Responsibility and Truth	Populism; Euroscepticism	Plamen Paskov	DNP	
4	We Citizens	Natsiya	Ultranationalism; Hard Euroscepticism	Plamen Paskov	DNP	
5	Independent candidate			Kuzman Iliev	DNP	
6	Bulgarian Voice	Bulgarian Voice	Bulgarian nationalism	Georgi Popov	Did not exist	
6	Bulgarian Voice	Alternative for Bulgaria	National conservatism	Georgi Popov	Did not exist	
7	Coalition of the Rose	Bulgarian Social Democracy-EuroLeft	Social Democracy	Aleksandr Tomov	DNP	
7	Coalition of the Rose	United Block of Labour	Social democracy Labourism	Aleksandr Tomov	DNP	
7	Coalition of the Rose	Patriotism 2000		Aleksandr Tomov	DNP	
8	Center	Svovoda	Bulgarian nationalism	Vasil Bozhkov	DNP	
8	Center	Bulgarian Agrarian Party	Agrarianism	Vasil Bozhkov	DNP	
8	Center	National Movement "Center"	Anti-corruption; Populism	Vasil Bozhkov	Did not exist	
9	Solidary Bulgaria	Bulgarian Left	Democratic socialism	Vanya Grigorova	DNP	
9	Solidary Bulgaria	United Social-Democracy	Social democracy	Vanya Grigorova	DNP	
9	Solidary Bulgaria	Stand Up.BG	Social democracy Left-wing populism	Vanya Grigorova	Did not exist	
9	Solidary Bulgaria	Solidarity Bulgaria	Labourism; Social democracy	Vanya Grigorova	0.48% (Note: Results with of Vanya Grigorova as an independent candidate.)	0 / 17
10	Unification		Centrism; Liberalism	Yani Andreev	Did not exist	
11	Bulgarian National Unification		Bulgarian nationalism National conservatism	Dimitar Bunov	0.12%	0 / 17
12	Revival		Ultra-nationalism; Social conservatism	Stanislav Stoyanov	1.04%	0 / 17
13	Morality, Unity, Honour		Anti-corruption; Social conservatism	Radostin Vasilev	Did not exist	
14	PP–DB	We Continue the Change	Liberalism; Anti-corruption	Nikola Minchev	Did not exist	
14	PP–DB	Volt Bulgaria	European federalism Pro-Europeanism	Nikola Minchev	0.18%	0 / 17
14	PP–DB	Democrats for a Strong Bulgaria	Conservatism; Anti-communism	Nikola Minchev	6.06%	1 / 17
14	PP–DB	Yes, Bulgaria!	Liberalism; Anti-corruption	Nikola Minchev	6.06%	1 / 17
15	People's Party "Truth and Only the Truth"		Anti-vaccination; Conspiracy theory support	Ventsislav Angelov	Did not exist	
16	Bulgarian Rise		National conservatism	Daniela Vezieva	Did not exist	
17	Citizens Block	Bulgarian Democratic Union-Radicals	Bulgarian nationalism	Ivan Geshev	DNP	
17	Citizens Block	Party of Bulgarian Women	Women's issues	Ivan Geshev	DNP	
17	Citizens Block	Citizens Block	Anti-corruption; Social conservatism	Ivan Geshev	Did not exist	
18	Society for a New Bulgaria		Social conservatism	Dimitar Tashev	DNP	
19	The Left!	Alternative for Bulgarian Revival	Social democracy Moderate social conservatism	Valeri Zhablyanov	0.86%	0 / 17
19	The Left!	ex-BSP faction	Social democracy	Valeri Zhablyanov	BSP	
19	The Left!	Movement 21	Social democracy	Valeri Zhablyanov	0.21%	0 / 17
19	The Left!	Agrarian Union "Aleksandar Stamboliyski"	Agrarianism	Valeri Zhablyanov	DNP	
19	The Left!	Green Party of Bulgaria	Green politics	Valeri Zhablyanov	DNP	
19	The Left!	Political Movement "Social Democrats"	Social democracy	Valeri Zhablyanov	DNP	
19	The Left!	National Movement for the Salvation of the Fatherland	Left-wing nationalism	Valeri Zhablyanov	DNP	
20	Party of the Greens		Green politics Left-wing nationalism	Todor Angelov	0.30%	0 / 17
21	We Are Coming		Anti-corruption; Liberalism	Nikolay Hadjigenov	Rise	
22	GERB—SDS	GERB	Social conservatism Pro-Europeanism	Rosen Zhelyazkov	30.13%	6 / 17
22	GERB—SDS	SDS	Christian Democracy; Anti-communism	Rosen Zhelyazkov	30.13%	6 / 17
22	GERB—SDS	George's Day Movement	National conservatism Bulgarian nationalism	Rosen Zhelyazkov	30.13%	6 / 17
23	Bulgarian National Union		Ultranationalism; Neo-nazism	Boyan Rasate	DNP	
24	BSP for Bulgaria	BSP	Social conservatism Social democracy	Kristian Vigenin	23.53%	5 / 17
24	BSP for Bulgaria	Ecoglasnost	Green politics Environmentalism	Kristian Vigenin	23.53%	5 / 17
24	BSP for Bulgaria	Political Club "Trakiya"	Left wing nationalism	Kristian Vigenin	23.53%	5 / 17
25	Velichie		Bulgarian nationalism Anti-corruption	Nikolay Markov	Did not exist	
26	VMRO		National conservatism Bulgarian nationalism	Angel Dzhambazki	7.14%	2 / 17
27	Political Party Direct Democracy		Bulgarian nationalism Direct democracy	Petar Klisarov	0.12%	0 / 17
28	Movement for Rights and Freedoms		Turkish minority interests Liberalism	Dzhevdet Chakarov	16.05%	3 / 17
29	Green Movement		Green liberalism Green politics	Borislav Sandov	Democratic Bulgaria	
30	For a Great Bulgaria		Bulgarian nationalism	Valeri Grigorov	Did not exist	
31	Bulgarian Union for Direct Democracy		Direct democracy	Daniel Bozhilov	DNP	

== Campaign ==
=== PP–DB ===
==== PP ====
On 24 January, after internal discussions, PP announced that their lead candidate for the EP elections would be the former Speaker of the 47th National Assembly and current MP, Nikola Minchev.

On 18 March, the PP Executive Committee approved a shortlist of 15 candidates, including Daniel Lorer, Yavor Bozhankov, Hristo Petrov (known more commonly by his rapper name Itso Hazarta), Nastimir Ananiev, Iskren Mitev, Hristo Daskalov and Denitsa Simeonova, some of which will end up in the common PP–DB list.

Following the Congress, PP confirmed their intention to participate in the upcoming election in a joint list with Democratic Bulgaria and presented a list of nominees for the list, which included the figures previously presented by the Executive Committee as well as MPs Iva Ruycheva and Miroslav Mavrov.

==== Yes, Bulgaria! ====
On 19 February, Yes, Bulgaria!, a member of DB, confirmed that the party would nominate candidates for the European Election list through internal elections.

On the 7 April, "Yes, Bulgaria!" officially set the date for their internal elections between the 16 and 18 of April, with a list of nominees for the position similarly being published. The party also confirmed their intention to participate in the EU elections together with PP.

On the 19 April, the party announced that former Bulgarian Ambassador to the United Nations Stefan Tafrov, an MEP candidate in the previous European elections, had won their internal primary.

==== DSB ====
The DSB, the other member of DB, is the only constituent party within PP–DB which has an MEP within the outgoing European Parliament, that being Radan Kanev.

On 17 January, Kanev confirmed that he would not be interested in becoming the list leader for a joint PP–DB list, although he did confirm his intention to participate in the upcoming EU elections and stated that he had already been nominated as the lead candidate from DSB.

=== Revival ===
Revival announced their list for the European Elections on the 16 of April, with the list being led by current MP Stanislav Stoyanov. Notably, the second position on the list was held by Petar Volgin, a journalist known for his pro-Russian stances.

=== DPS ===
DPS announced their list for the European Elections on the 6 May, being led by the co-leader of the party, Dzhevdet Chakarov, and including incumbent BSP MEP, Elena Yoncheva.

=== BSP ===
The Bulgarian Socialist Party announced their list for the European Parliamentary Elections on the 27th of April, being headed by current MP, former MEP and former Minister of Foreign Affairs Kristian Vigenin. Due to disagreements with party leader Korneliya Ninova, none of the party’s current MEPs, with the exception of Tsvetelina Penkova, ended up in the party’s list.

=== Other parties and independents ===
==== Other parties ====
On the 16 April, VMRO leader, Krasimir Karakachanov, confirmed the party, which currently has two MEPs in the outgoing European Parliament, intended to contest the upcoming European Elections alone. The VMRO list was to be headed by current MEP, Angel Dzhambazki.

Green Movement, a former member of the PP–DB coalition, similarly announced their intention to participate in the twin European-National elections independently.

Solidary Bulgaria, a new electoral alliance between former Sofia mayoral candidate Vanya Grigorova and IS.BG leader Maya Manolova, will contest the European elections.

==== Independent candidates ====
Kuzman Iliev, Bulgarian economist and head of the civic organisation "Bulgaria Can", announced his intention to run as an independent on the 14 April 2024.

== Opinion polling ==
Polling firm	Fieldwork date	Sample	GERB—SDS EPP	BSPzB S&D	DPS Renew	VMRO ECR	PP–DB Renew-EPP (Note: PP–DB is an electoral alliance, including parties with different european affiliations. PP has expressed interest in joining Renew Europe, while MEP Radan Kanev from DSB sits in the EPP Group and DaB! is considering applying for EPP membership.)	Revival NI	ITN ECR (Note: ITN, despite not being an official member yet, has announced its intention to join the ECR Group.)	Blue Bulgaria ECR	Others	NOTA	Lead
Alpha Research	1-4 June 2024	1000	25; 5	7.9; 2	14.1; 3	—	15.9; 3	15.7; 3	5.9; 1	2.9; 0	12.6 (Note: Includes Solidary Bulgaria at 2.3, winning no seats)	—	9.1
CAM	1-4 June 2024	821	26.2; 5	8.1; 2	14.1; 3	—	17.7; 4	14.8; 3	5.3; 0	2.1; 0	—	—	8.5
Sova Haris	29 May-3 June 2024	1000	26.4; 6	8.9; 2	14.4; 3	—	15.4; 3	15.3; 3	5.6; 0	—	14	—	11
Market Links	22 May-2 June 2024	1004	28.8; 6	8.7; 2	12.4; 3	—	20.2; 4	11.4; 2	3.9; 0	2.2; 0	7.4 (Note: Includes, CENTER at 2% and Solidary Bulgaria at 1.7%, all winning no seats)	2.1	8.6
TREND	11–18 May 2024	1003	25.9; 5	8.1; 2	14.6; 3	1.2; 0	16.1; 4	15.1; 3	5.5; 0	1.8; 0	12.4 (Note: Includes, Solidary Bulgaria at 2.1%, Left at 1.2%, BV at 1.2%, all winning no seats)	5.3	9.8
Sova Harris	8–13 May 2024	1000	28.3; 6	10.3; 2	13.3; 3	—	15.8; 3	15; 3	5.2; 0	—	11.5	—	12.5
MarketLinks	29 April–9 May 2024	—	29.4; 6	9.3; 2	13.1; 3	—	20.6; 4	12.3; 2	2.7; 0	1.7; 0	6.4 (Note: Includes, Solidary Bulgaria at 2.5% winning no seats)	4.2	8.8
Alpha Research	28 April–5 May 2024	1000	25.1; 5	8.0; 2	14.4; 3	—	18.5; 4	14.8; 3	4.8; 0	2.4; 0	12.0 (Note: Includes, Solidary Bulgaria at 2.3%, Levitsata! at 1.9%, and Bulgarian Rise at 1.2%, all winning no seats)	—	6.6
Gallup	22 April–2 May 2024	808	26.4; 5	8.2; 2	14.9; 3	1.3; 0	17.5; 4	14.7; 3	4.5; 0	1.4; 0	11.1 (Note: Includes, Solidary Bulgaria at 2.2%, winning no seats)	—	8.9
TREND	12–19 April 2024	1002	27.2; 5	9.4; 2	15.4; 3	—	17.2; 4	15.3; 3	5.1; 0	—	10.1 (Note: Includes BV and Levitsata!, both at 1.8% and winning no seats)	—	10.1
Gallup	28 March-5 April 2024	805	28.7; 5	10.1; 2	15.3; 3	—	18.2; 4	15.1; 3	5.5; 0	—	9.8	—	6.2
IPSOS	N/A	N/A	27.1; 5	8.8; 2	13.0; 2	—	20.9; 4	15.1; 3	6.1; 1	—	8.9 (Note: Includes BV at 2.9% and Levitsata! at 2.2%, both winning no seats)	—	6.2
Alpha Research	1-7 March 2024	1000	27.0; 5	10.6; 2	10.0; 2	—	23.8; 5	15.8; 3	5.9; 0	—	6.9	—	3.2
Market Links	24 February-3 March 2024	1058	26.4; 5	9.7; 2	14.0; 3	—	22.7; 4	13.5; 3	3.8; 0	—	6.1	3.9	3.7
2019 election	26 May 2019	—N/a	30.4; 6	23.5; 5	16.1; 3	7.1; 2	5.9 (Note: Democratic Bulgaria only); 1	1.0; 0	—	—	2.6	4.1	6.9

== Results ==
Party	Votes	%	Seats	+/–
GERB–SDS	474,059	23.55	5	–1
Movement for Rights and Freedoms	295,092	14.66	3	0
We Continue the Change – Democratic Bulgaria	290,865	14.45	3	+2
Revival	281,434	13.98	3	+3
BSP for Bulgaria	141,178	7.01	2	–3
There is Such a People	121,572	6.04	1	New
Velichie	81,955	4.07	–	New
Morality, Unity, Honour	51,076	2.54	–	New
VMRO – Bulgarian National Movement	42,022	2.09	–	–2
Blue Bulgaria	24,917	1.24	–	New
Solidary Bulgaria	24,685	1.23	–	New
Center	20,869	1.04	–	New
Party of the Greens	17,131	0.85	–	0
Independent candidate Kuzman Iliev	11,057	0.55	–	New
The Left!	10,230	0.51	–	New
Bulgarian Rise	9,510	0.47	–	New
Green Movement	8,347	0.41	–	–
People's Voice	6,921	0.34	–	–
Direct Democracy	5,257	0.26	–	–
We Are Coming	4,999	0.25	–	New
We the Citizens	4,937	0.25	–	New
Unification	4,302	0.21	–	New
Bulgarian Voice	2,821	0.14	–	New
Citizens Bloc	2,310	0.11	–	New
Coalition of the Rose	2,294	0.11	–	New
Society for a New Bulgaria	2,073	0.10	–	New
Bulgarian National Union – New Democracy	1,956	0.10	–	New
For a Great Bulgaria	1,770	0.09	–	New
People's Party "Truth and Only the Truth"	1,733	0.09	–	New
Bulgarian National Unification	983	0.05	–	–
Bulgarian Union for Direct Democracy	895	0.04	–	New
None of the above	63,810	3.17	–	–
Total	2,013,060	100.00	17	0
Valid votes	2,013,060	97.05		
Invalid/blank votes	61,238	2.95		
Total votes	2,074,298	100.00		
Registered voters/turnout	6,170,472	33.62		
Source: Central Electoral Commission, European Parliament

=== Parliamentary groups ===
Parliamentary Group	Seats
EPP: • GERB (4); • SDS (1); • DSB (1)	6 / 17
RE: • DPS (3); • PP (2)	5 / 17
ESN: • Revival (3)	3 / 17
S&D: • BSP (2)	2 / 17
ECR: • ITN (1)	1 / 17

== See also ==
- June 2024 Bulgarian parliamentary election
- Bulgaria (European Parliament constituency)
