= List of members of the European Parliament for Bulgaria (2024–2029) =

This is the list of the 17 members of the European Parliament for Bulgaria in the 2024 to 2029 session. The members were elected in the 2024 European Parliament election in Bulgaria.

== List ==
Name	National party	EP Group	Preference votes	Ref.
Andrey Kovatchev	Citizens for European Development of Bulgaria (GERB)	EPP	35,195	
Andrey Novakov	Citizens for European Development of Bulgaria (GERB)	EPP	27,601	
Emil Radev	Citizens for European Development of Bulgaria (GERB)	EPP	18,047	
Eva Maydell (Note: Rosen Zhelyazkov was elected but he did not take over his seat.)	Citizens for European Development of Bulgaria (GERB)	EPP	10,241	
Iliya Lazarov	Union of Democratic Forces (SDS)	EPP	6,345	
Ilhan Kyuchyuk	Movement for Rights and Freedoms (DPS)	RE	8,320	
Elena Yoncheva (Note: Dzhevdet Chakarov was elected but he did not take over his seat.)	Movement for Rights and Freedoms (DPS)	RE	4,075	
Taner Kabilov (Note: Iskra Mihaylova was elected but she did not take over her seat.)	Movement for Rights and Freedoms (DPS)	RE	3,279	
Nikola Minchev	We Continue the Change (PP)	RE	44,760	
Hristo Petrov	We Continue the Change (PP)	RE	25,580	
Petar Volgin	Revival (V)	ESN	71,287	
Stanislav Stoyanov	Revival (V)	ESN	31,346	
Rada Laykova	Revival (V)	ESN	4,902	
Kristian Vigenin	Bulgarian Socialist Party (BSP)	S&D	27,171	
Tsvetelina Penkova	Bulgarian Socialist Party (BSP)	S&D	9,929	
Radan Kanev	Democrats for a Strong Bulgaria (DSB)	EPP	25,580	
Ivaylo Valchev	There is Such a People (ITN)	ECR	41,000	
