= List of members of the European Parliament for Bulgaria, 2024–2029 =

This is the list of the 17 members of the European Parliament for Bulgaria in the 2024 to 2029 session. The members were elected in the 2024 European Parliament election in Bulgaria.

== List ==
Name	National party	EP Group	Preference votes
Andrey Kovatchev	GERB—SDS (GERB)	EPP	35 195
Andrey Novakov	GERB—SDS (GERB)	EPP	27 601
Emil Radev	GERB—SDS (GERB)	EPP	18 047
Eva Maydell	GERB—SDS (GERB)	EPP	10 241
Iliya Lazarov	GERB—SDS (SDS)	EPP	7 220
Radan Kanev	PP-DB (DSB)	EPP	37 057
Nikola Minchev	PP-DB (PP)	Renew Europe	44 760
Hristo Petrov	PP-DB (PP)	Renew Europe	25 580
Ilhan Kyuchyuk	DPS	Renew Europe	8 320
Elena Yoncheva	DPS	Renew Europe	4 075
Taner Kabilov	DPS	Renew Europe	3 279
Petar Volgin	Revival	Non-Inscrits	71 287
Stanislav Stoyanov	Revival	Non-Inscrits	31 346
Rada Laykova	Revival	Non-Inscrits	4 902
Kristian Vigenin	BSP	S&D	27 171
Tsvetelina Penkova	BSP	S&D	9 929
Ivaylo Valchev	ITN	Non-Inscrits	41 000
