= Bulgarian Left =

Democratic socialist party in Bulgaria

Bulgarian Left Българската левица Bǎlgarskata levitsa
- Abbreviation: BL
- Leader: Hristofor Dochev; Ivan Genov; Margarita Mileva
- Founded: 19 February 2009
- Headquarters: Sofia
- Membership (2012): 6,000
- Ideology: Democratic socialism
- Political position: Left-wing
- National affiliation: Bulgarian Left Coalition (2009); Citizens of Protest (Apr 2021); BSP for Bulgaria (Jun–Nov 2021); Solidary Bulgaria (Jun 2024); My Country Bulgaria (Oct 2024)
- European affiliation: Party of the European Left
- Colors: Red
- National Assembly: 0 / 240
- European Parliament: 0 / 17

Website
- levicata.org

The Bulgarian Left (Bulgarian: Българската левица, Bǎlgarskata levitsa, BL) is a democratic socialist political party in Bulgaria. It was created in February 2009 predominantly by members of the Bulgarian Socialist Party (BSP), with its constituent congress taking place on 4 April 2009. Its leaders are Hristofor Dochev, Ivan Genov, and Margarita Mileva.

A full member of the Party of the European Left (PEL) since September 2010, (Note: Approved as a full member by the Executive Board of the PEL in Luxembourg in September 2010. The decision was ratified by the PEL's third congress in December 2010.) it is one of the few parties in the country to hold progressive views in regards to LGBT rights in Bulgaria. Alongside the BSP, the Democrats for a Strong Bulgaria, and the Green Movement, the BL was one of the few parties to have supported the parade organizers' right to hold the pride parade, and the only party, alongside the Greens, to have send statements of support to the parade.

In the 2013 Bulgarian parliamentary election, the BL won 5,924 votes (0.17%) and failed to win any seats. In the 2014 Bulgarian parliamentary election, the party participated in a coalition with the Green Party of Bulgaria; together, they won 7,010 votes (0.21%). This coalition continued during 2017 Bulgarian parliamentary election, in which they won 2,876 votes (0.08%).

In the run up to the 2024 parliamentary and European elections, BL joined Solidary Bulgaria.

== Election results ==
=== National Assembly ===
Election	Votes	%	Seats	+/–	Government
2009 (Note: Run as part of the Bulgarian Left Coalition.)	8,762	0.21 (#11)	0 / 240	New	Extra-parliamentary
2013	5,924	0.17 (#24)	0 / 240	0	Extra-parliamentary
2014 (Note: Run in a joint list with Green Party.)	7,010	0.21 (#20)	0 / 240	0	Extra-parliamentary
2017 (Note: Run in the WHO – Bulgarian Left and Green Party coalition.)	2,916	0.08 (#19)	0 / 240	0	Extra-parliamentary
Apr 2021 (Note: Run as part of the Citizens of Protest coalition.)	2,356	0.07 (#27)	0 / 240	0	Extra-parliamentary
Jul 2021 (Note: Run as part of the BSP for Bulgaria coalition.)	365,695	13.22 (#3)	0 / 240	0	Extra-parliamentary
Nov 2021	267,817	10.07 (#4)	0 / 240	0	Extra-parliamentary
2022	Did not contest		0 / 240	0	Extra-parliamentary
2023	Did not contest		0 / 240	0	Extra-parliamentary
Jun 2024 (Note: Run as part of the Solidary Bulgaria coalition.)	31,472	1.47 (#10)	0 / 240	0	Extra-parliamentary
Oct 2024 (Note: Run as part of the My Country Bulgaria coalition (BL and OSD).)	2,781	0.11 (#18)	0 / 240	0	Extra-parliamentary

=== European Parliament ===
Election	List leader	Votes	%	Seats	+/–	EP Group
2014	Margarita Mileva	11,014	0.49 (#12)	0 / 17	New	–
2019	Did not contest			0 / 17	0	–
2024 (Note: Run as part of the Solidary Bulgaria coalition.)	Vanya Grigorova	24,685	1.23 (#11)	0 / 17	0	–
