= European Parliament Committee on Regional Development =

European Parliament committee

Committee on Regional Development
- REGI
- Type: Standing committee
- Legislature: European Parliament
- Parliamentary term: 10th European Parliament
- Chair: Dragoș Benea; S&D, Romania
- Vice-chairs: Gabriella Gerzsenyi (EPP); Nora Mebarek (S&D); Francesco Ventola (ECR); Ľubica Karvašová (Renew)
- Members: 41
- Political-group composition: EPP: 11 · S&D: 8 · ECR: 4 · Renew: 4 · PfE: 5 · Greens/EFA: 3 · The Left: 3 · ESN: 1 · NI: 2
- Jurisdiction: Regional and cohesion policy, the European Regional Development Fund, the Cohesion Fund, territorial cooperation and the outermost regions
- Corresponding Council body: General Affairs Council
- Website: Official website

The Committee on Regional Development (REGI) is a standing committee of the European Parliament. It is responsible for the European Union's regional and cohesion policy, including the European Regional Development Fund, the Cohesion Fund, territorial cooperation, urban and rural territorial development and the Union's outermost regions.

The committee examines how EU funding is used to reduce economic, social and territorial disparities between regions. It also scrutinises the design and implementation of cohesion-policy programmes and the effect of other Union policies on regional development.

== Responsibilities ==
REGI is responsible for regional-development and cohesion policy as provided for in the Treaties. Its work includes legislation governing the structural funds, the Cohesion Fund, European territorial cooperation and measures addressing the specific needs of regions facing geographical, demographic or economic disadvantages.

Its remit includes:

- the European Regional Development Fund;
- the Cohesion Fund;
- the territorial dimension of the European Social Fund Plus;
- Interreg and other forms of European territorial cooperation;
- economic, social and territorial cohesion;
- urban and rural territorial development;
- regions affected by industrial transition;
- sparsely populated, mountainous, island and border regions;
- the Union's outermost regions;
- cooperation with regional and local authorities;
- the territorial effects of other EU policies; and
- relations with the European Committee of the Regions, interregional organisations and local-government associations.

== Cohesion policy ==
Cohesion policy is the European Union's principal investment policy for reducing disparities between regions and supporting balanced territorial development. It finances infrastructure, business development, innovation, environmental projects, social inclusion and the transition to a climate-neutral and digital economy.

REGI acts as Parliament's lead committee for the regulations governing the European Regional Development Fund, the Cohesion Fund and Interreg. It also examines the common rules applying to cohesion-policy funds and monitors negotiations between the Commission, member states and regional authorities.

== Territorial cooperation and regional challenges ==
The committee deals with cross-border, transnational and interregional cooperation through the Interreg programmes. These programmes support joint projects between regions in different member states and neighbouring countries in fields such as transport, environmental protection, public services, innovation and emergency preparedness.

REGI also examines the effects of population decline, ageing, geographical isolation, industrial transition and unequal access to public services. Particular attention is given to border regions, islands, mountainous areas, sparsely populated territories and the outermost regions.

== Implementation and oversight ==
The committee monitors the implementation of cohesion programmes and may organise hearings, missions and exchanges of views with the European Commission, national governments, regional authorities and beneficiaries. It examines delays, administrative burdens, audit requirements and the effectiveness of EU-funded projects.

REGI also considers how cohesion funding contributes to wider Union priorities, including climate action, energy transition, digitalisation, transport connectivity, social inclusion and recovery from economic or natural disasters.

== Chairs ==
The following table lists the chairs of the committee since 2004.

Name	Political group	Member state	Took office	Left office
Gerardo Galeote	EPP–ED	Spain	2004	2009
Danuta Hübner	EPP	Poland	2009	2014
Iskra Mihaylova	ALDE	Bulgaria	2014	2019
Younous Omarjee	GUE/NGL	France	2019	2024
Dragoș Benea	S&D	Romania	2024	Incumbent

== Members ==
=== 10th Parliament, 2024–2029 ===
The committee currently has 41 full members. Its current composition is shown below, with the chair and vice-chairs indicated in italics.

European People's Party	Progressive Alliance of Socialists and Democrats	European Conservatives and Reformists	Renew Europe
Gabriella Gerzsenyi, Hungary, Vice-Chair; Pascal Arimont, Belgium; Fredis Beleris, Greece; Daniel Buda, Romania; Christian Doleschal, Germany; Krzysztof Hetman, Poland; Isabelle Le Callennec, France; Dan-Ştefan Motreanu, Romania; Elena Nevado del Campo, Spain; Andrey Novakov, Bulgaria; Marta Wcisło, Poland	Dragoș Benea, Romania, Chair; Nora Mebarek, France, Vice-Chair; Andi Cristea, Romania; Klára Dobrev, Hungary; Sérgio Gonçalves, Portugal; Sabrina Repp, Germany; Marcos Ros Sempere, Spain; Raffaele Topo, Italy	Francesco Ventola, Italy, Vice-Chair; Antonella Sberna, Italy; Șerban Dimitrie Sturdza, Romania; Waldemar Tomaszewski, Lithuania	Ľubica Karvašová, Slovakia, Vice-Chair; Raquel García Hermida-van der Walle, Netherlands; Elsi Katainen, Finland; Ciaran Mullooly, Ireland
Patriots for Europe	Greens–European Free Alliance	The Left	Europe of Sovereign Nations
Tamás Deutsch, Hungary; Klara Dostalova, Czechia; Afroditi Latinopoulou, Greece; André Rougé, France; Rody Tolassy, France	Gordan Bosanac, Croatia; Vladimir Prebilič, Slovenia; Mārtiņš Staķis, Latvia	Kathleen Funchion, Ireland; Younous Omarjee, France; Valentina Palmisano, Italy	Irmhild Boßdorf, Germany
Non-Inscrits			
Ruth Firmenich, Germany; Fidias Panayiotou, Cyprus			

==== Substitute members ====
Substitute members of the 10th Parliament (click “show” to expand)

The committee's substitute members are listed below.

European People's Party	Progressive Alliance of Socialists and Democrats	European Conservatives and Reformists	Renew Europe
Maravillas Abadía Jover, Spain; Nikolina Brnjac, Croatia; Andrzej Buła, Poland; Paulo do Nascimento Cabral, Portugal; Jan Farský, Czechia; Esther Herranz García, Spain; Alexandra Mehnert, Germany; Jacek Protas, Poland; Maria Walsh, Ireland; Iuliu Winkler, Romania	Sakis Arnaoutoglou, Greece; Daniel Attard, Malta; Sofie Eriksson, Sweden; Hannes Heide, Austria; Tsvetelina Penkova, Bulgaria; Rosa Serrano Sierra, Spain; Georgia Tramacere, Italy; Marko Vešligaj, Croatia	Waldemar Buda, Poland; Giuseppe Milazzo, Italy; Denis Nesci, Italy; Guillaume Peltier, France	Dan Barna, Romania; Sandro Gozi, France; Joachim Streit, Germany
Patriots for Europe	Greens–European Free Alliance	The Left	Europe of Sovereign Nations
Mireia Borrás Pabón, Spain; Marie-Luce Brasier-Clain, France; France Jamet, France; Julien Leonardelli, France; Aldo Patriciello, Italy	Rasmus Andresen, Germany; Cristina Guarda, Italy; Ana Miranda Paz, Spain	Giuseppe Antoci, Italy; Elena Kountoura, Greece; Mimmo Lucano, Italy	Volker Schnurrbusch, Germany
Non-Inscrits			
Katarína Roth Neveďalová, Slovakia			

== Research support ==
The committee is supported by the European Parliament's Policy Department for Structural and Cohesion Policies. It provides studies, briefings and analyses on cohesion policy, regional disparities, structural funds, territorial cooperation, demographic change, urban development and the specific conditions of individual regions.

Research prepared for the committee is published through Parliament's supporting-analyses database and the European Parliament Think Tank.

== See also ==
- Regional policy of the European Union
- European Regional Development Fund
- Cohesion Fund
- Interreg
- European Structural and Investment Funds
- European Committee of the Regions
- Nomenclature of Territorial Units for Statistics
- Special territories of members of the European Economic Area
- Directorate-General for Regional and Urban Policy
