= Solidary Bulgaria =

Bulgarian electoral coalition

Solidary Bulgaria Солидарна България
- Abbreviation: SB
- Leader: Vanya Grigorova
- Founders: Vanya Grigorova; Maya Manolova
- Founded: 23 April 2024
- Split from: The Left
- Political position: Centre-left to left-wing
- European affiliation: Party of the European Left (BL)
- Colours: Red
- National Assembly: 0 / 240
- European Parliament: 0 / 17

Website
- Solidary Bulgaria

Solidary Bulgaria (Bulgarian: Солидарна България, romanized: Solidarna Bŭlgariya) is a left-wing Bulgarian electoral coalition. The alliance was formed prior to the 2024 election. Its chairperson is Vanya Grigorova.

== History ==
Following Grigorova's strong performance in the 2023 Sofia mayoral election, there was speculation she might have broken away from the BSP and form her own political party to run in the next election.

In April 2024, there were negotiations between several leftist parties to form the electoral coalition in time for the 2024 European and parliamentary elections. Grigorova, alongside 3 leftist parties, officially formed the coalition. The coalition shares its name with a leftist group Grigorova was a founding member of in the early 2010s.

Prior to the October 2024 Bulgarian parliamentary election, Vanya Grigorova announced that Solidary Bulgaria would not participate in the elections, either independently or as part of BSP – United Left. Despite this, ISBg, a member of the coalition in the prior elections, contested the elections as part of BSP - United Left.

== Composition ==
The coalition registered on 23 April 2024, ahead of the 2024 European and parliamentary elections. They were primarily formed between the ex-BSP politician Grigorova and the IS.BG leader Manolova. Two smaller parties, Bulgarian Left and United Social Democracy, were also registered under the coalition. The coalition also includes several independent professional figures.

Party	Leader	Ideology	Position
Stand Up.BG (IS.BG)	Maya Manolova	Social democracy Anti-corruption	Centre-left to left-wing
Bulgarian Left (BL)	Iliya Bozhinov; Petko Todorov; Ivan Genov	Democratic socialism	Left-wing
United Social Democracy (OS)	Yordan Gergov	Social democracy	Centre-left

== Election results ==
=== National Assembly ===
Election	Leader	Votes	%	Seats	+/–	Status
Jun 2024	Vanya Grigorova	31,472	1.47 (#10)	0 / 240	New	Extra-parliamentary

=== European Parliament ===
Election	List leader	Votes	%	Seats	+/–	EP Group
2024	Vanya Grigorova	24,685	1.23 (#11)	0 / 17	New	–
