= Petar Vitanov =

Petar Vitanov may refer to:

- Petar Vitanov (footballer)
- Petar Vitanov (politician)
