= Stanislav Stoyanov =

Stanislav Stoyanov may refer to:

- Stanislav Stoyanov (footballer)
- Stanislav Stoyanov (politician)
