= Iskren Mitev =

Bulgarian politician (born 1989)

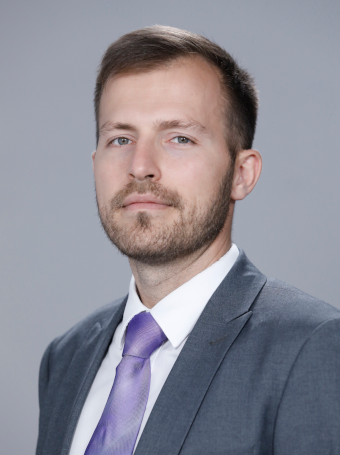
- Mitev in 2022

Member of the National Assembly
- In office 3 December 2021 – 18 June 2024
- Constituency: 25th MMC (2021–2022); 23rd MMC (2022–2023); Sofia Province (2023–2024)

Personal details
- Born: 22 March 1989 (age 37)
- Party: We Continue the Change

Iskren Nikolaev Mitev (Bulgarian: Искрен Николаев Митев; born 22 March 1989) is a Bulgarian businessman and politician of We Continue the Change. From 2021 to 2024, he was a member of the National Assembly. In the 2024 European Parliament election, he was a candidate for member of the European Parliament.
