= Angel Dzhambazki =

Bulgarian politician (born 1979)

- Ангел Джамбазки
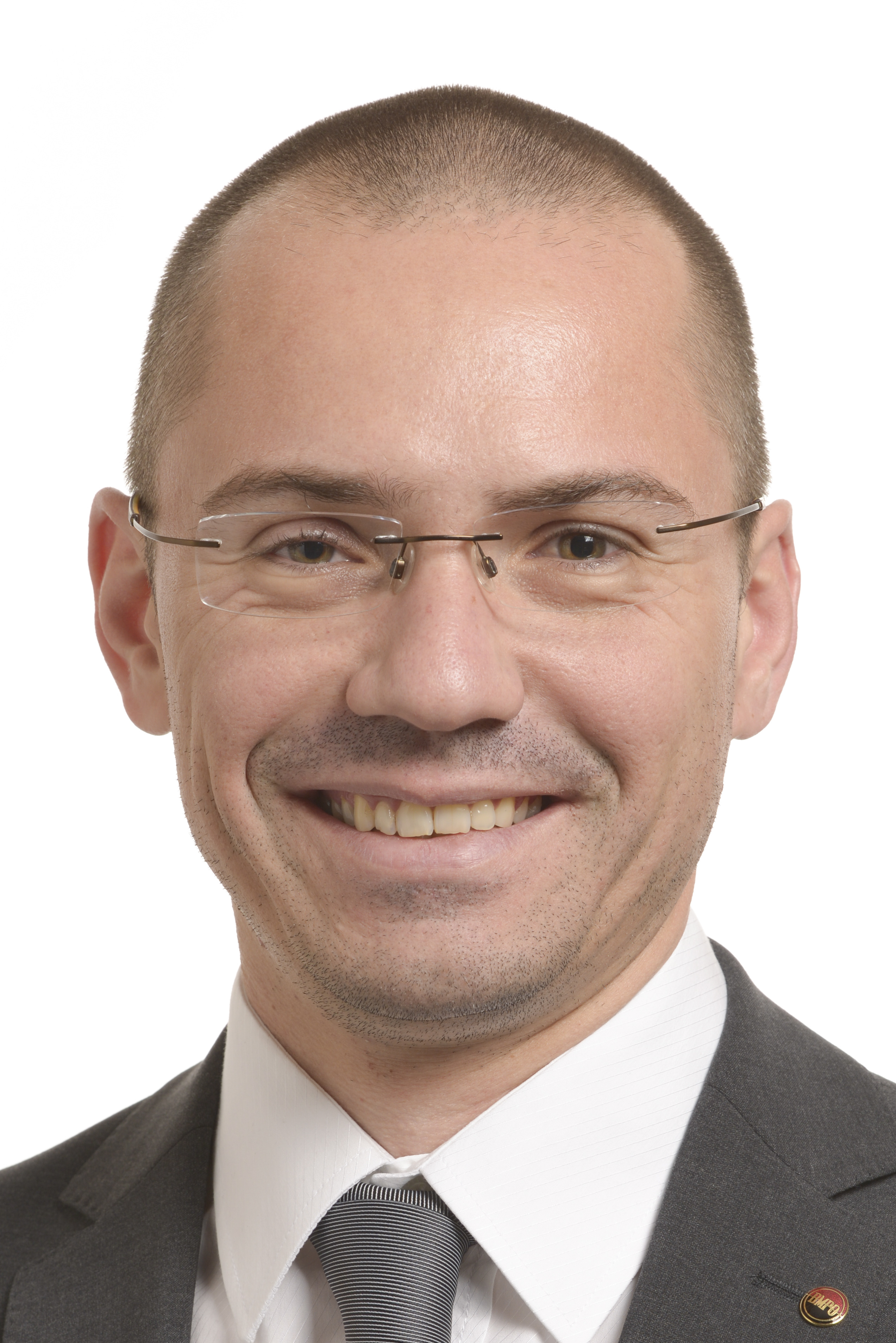

Member of the European Parliament for Bulgaria
- In office 1 July 2014 – 15 July 2024
- Preceded by: Dimitar Stoyanov
- Succeeded by: Ivaylo Valchev

Member of the Sofia City Council
- In office 19 November 2007 – 29 May 2014

Personal details
- Born: Angel Chavdarov Dzhambazki; 21 March 1979 (age 47) Sofia, PR Bulgaria
- Citizenship: Bulgarian
- Party: VMRO-BND (since 1997)
- Other political affiliations: European Conservatives and Reformists
- Children: 1
- Education: Sofia University
- Occupation: Politician
- Website: https://www.djambazki.org

Angel Chavdarov Dzhambazki (Bulgarian: Ангел Чавдаров Джамбазки, born 21 March 1979) is a Bulgarian politician who served as Member of the European Parliament from 2014 to 2024. He is also a member of the far-right party VMRO-BND and served as its co-chairman, having joined the nationalist party's youth organization in 1997 and gradually progressed through its ranks.

== Politics ==
=== Member of the Sofia City Council ===
Dzhambazki was a member of the Sofia city council between 2007 and 2014 after first being elected on the ticket of GERB, though making use of the quota for citizens, and then securing a seat in October 2011 as a candidate of VMRO-BND.

In November 2013, the Bulgarian Helsinki Committee notified Bulgaria's then-Chief Prosecutor Sotir Tsatsarov in relation to comments made by Dzhambazki, other VMRO-BND members and football fans during an anti-immigrant procession in Sofia. Dzhambazki has criticized the non-governmental organization for being what it described as an "instrument for the destruction of the nation". Three years later, Dzhambazki and his party filed a motion before Tsatsarov, which sought to have the activities of the Helsinki Committee banned in Bulgaria, alleging that they had been "pressuring" and "influencing" judges through the use of seminars, which they claim led to the granting of the parole request of Jock Palfreeman. The NGO rejected the allegations, dubbing them a "part of the VMRO's election campaign".

=== Member of the European Parliament ===
In May 2014, Dzhambazki was elected to the European Parliament as a member of the Bulgaria Without Censorship-VMRO-BND electoral coalition. In 2016 and 2017, Dzhambazki was accused of making racist, xenophobic and homophobic comments. He was reelected to the European Parliament on his party's own list in the 2019 European Parliament election.

On 16 February 2022, after defending the governments of Hungary and Poland in a speech at the European Parliament, Dzhambazki insulted his fellow MEP Sandro Gozi (Renew Europe) and apparently made a Nazi salute while leaving the chamber. Dzhambazki's actions were immediately censored by the Vice-President of the European Parliament Giuseppina Picierno, who was presiding over the session.

Roberta Metsola, President of the European Parliament, stated that Dzhambazki could be sanctioned under Rule 10 of the European Parliament's rules of procedure which deals with the conduct of members of the European parliament. Dzhambazki said his hand sign was a goodbye signal to his political career.

==== Candidate for Mayor of Sofia ====
In September 2019, he announced his candidacy for Mayor of Sofia, Bulgaria's capital and largest city, during Bulgaria's 2019 local elections. He focused his campaign on dismantling ghettos inhabited primarily by Bulgaria's Romani minority, as well as banning the annual Sofia Pride gay parade as part of what he described as a 'law and order' campaign. He came under criticism from his former coalition partner Volen Siderov, as he refused to resign his seat on the European Parliament as he stood for election as Mayor of Sofia. He came in fifth with 3.90% of the vote.

=== Political views and statements ===
Since the start of his political career, Dzhambazki has opposed the role of the Movement for Rights and Freedoms in Bulgarian politics, declaring the party as "toxic" and a "criminal organization".

In October 2015, Dzhambazki asserted that "the centre of Sofia is turning into a Little Arabia, while its peripheries are becoming unsafe; there are also too many gypsy autonomous enclaves", in a tone characteristic of his far-right party. In March 2017, Dzhambazki described himself as a Bulgarian nationalist.

In April 2019, Dzhambazki celebrated the cancellation of Bulgaria's "National Strategy for Children (2019-2030)", which he stated was "scandalous" and would "legalize controversial practices in childrearing, debate the role of the family and parents and lead to a conclusion that would lead the country along the perverted lines of countries such as Norway or the Netherlands". He declared that the cancellation of the strategy was a victory for himself and his party, which he opined would continue to "fight to defend tradition, the family and Christian values" and against "multiculturalism and eurobureaocratism".

Dzhambazki condemned a statement to the UN general assembly by Bulgarian Foreign Minister Ekaterina Zaharieva regarding child rights on 27 September 2019, stating that he found it "unacceptable" for the interests of the child to be viewed as "isolated" from its parents or to come into conflict with the parent's interests. He also stated that he found it "unacceptable" for biological parents to have the same status as legal guardians and social services put in care of children.

On 26 November 2019, he condemned the Istanbul Convention against domestic violence, which he stated would not prevent violence against women, but instead "destroy the Christian family and traditional values, consisting of a man, woman and their children", adding that "everything else is a perversion and gender propaganda".

On 27 November 2019, he delivered a speech to the European Parliament, in which he accused the plenary session of being "devoted to LGBT propaganda" and stated that he rejected "homosexual propaganda, as well as actions close to paedophillia". He further accused the EU Parliament of Bolshevism, stating to the assembly that the parliament had acted like "Chinese communist-bolsheviks", which led to him being booed by MEPs. Dzhambazki took a vocally strong stance against the 2019 proposed changes to the EU transport law proposed by French President Emmanuel Macron. Dzhambazki stated that the reform plan had been pushed alongside an "organized campaign against Bulgarian national interests", as the reforms were deemed to hurt Bulgarian transport companies. On 17 December 2019, a statement he published online against the proposed reform package was put under investigation for racism by the European Parliament, after he dubbed transport committee chairwoman Karima Delli a "French woman from Algerian descent" and another one of the bill's authors, Ismail Ertug, as a "German man from Turkish descent". Following condemnation from several MEPs, Dzhambazki stated that he would apologise if the two felt offended, adding that he himself would not be offended if someone were to dub him a "Bulgarian from Macedonian descent".

In April 2020, Dzhambazki stated that the Bulgarian population needed to be protected from the Roma people, which amount to about 5% of the population, while some researchers estimated them as being twice the size.

Dzhambazki has repeatedly stated that "Macedonia is Bulgarian." He has also stated that Macedonians and Bulgarians are one nation. Dzhambazki disputed the 2021 North Macedonia census, in regards to the number of enumerated Bulgarians.

== Personal life ==
Dzhambazki is a graduate of Sofia University, where he specialized in international studies. In addition to his native Bulgarian, Dzhambazki also speaks English, German and Russian. Among his hobbies is mountaineering. He has stated that before entering politics, he sold newspapers and pizza.

On 19 November 2018, Dzhambazki was detained at Sofia Airport after an attempt to bring a Makarov pistol onto a flight. The weapon was legally owned and Dzhambazki stated that he had forgotten to remove it from his luggage prior to boarding. It was kept in storage by airport authorities for a few days, following which it was returned to Dzhambazki.

In a 2019 interview, Dzhambazki announced that he had fathered a daughter, who he named after a protagonist in a song, but did not mention who the child's mother was and stated that he did not wish to discuss his personal life further. On 6 December 2019, he was caught driving under the influence (DUI) of alcohol at night by a Bulgarian police patrol. The breathalyzer test administered to him initially showed a result of a BAC by volume of 1,5 per mille, punishable under Bulgarian law by 1 to 3 years imprisonment, though he was not charged due to his legal immunity as an MEP. А blood test given by Dzhambazki later verified that he had consumed alcohol, but showed a lowered BAC figure to under 1,2 per mille - punishable under Bulgarian law with an administrative penalty. Dzhambazki confessed that he had been drinking and driving that night, stating that he regretted and was embarrassed by what he dubbed his own "absolutely bad judgement, irrational and irresponsible behaviour". He pledged that in the future he would quit either drinking or driving.

On 7 January 2020, MEP and Reload Bulgaria leader Nikolay Barekov accused Dzhambazki of abusing his influence and forensic manipulation in regards to his DUI, submitting the case before Bulgaria's newly-appointed Chief Prosecutor Ivan Geshev. The allegation was that Dzhambazki did not give a blood test to the hospital which he was ordered to visit, but instead to the Military Medical Academy, an institution subordinate to Bulgarian Minister of Defence and fellow VMRO-BND party leader Krasimir Karakachanov.

During the COVID-19 pandemic Dzhambazki has volunteered at the COVID ward in the Military Medical Academy.
