= Aleksandar Yordanov =

Bulgarian politician

Aleksandar Yordanov MEP
- Александър Йорданов

Member of the European Parliament for Bulgaria
- In office 2 July 2019 – 15 July 2024

Personal details
- Born: 13 February 1952 (age 74) Varna

Alexander Yordanov (Bulgarian: Александър Александров Йорданов, Aleksand'r Aleksandrov Jordanov, born 13 February 1952) is a Bulgarian literary critic and politician who was elected as a Member of the European Parliament in 2019.
