= Petar Vitanov (politician) =

Bulgarian politician

Petar Vitanov MEP
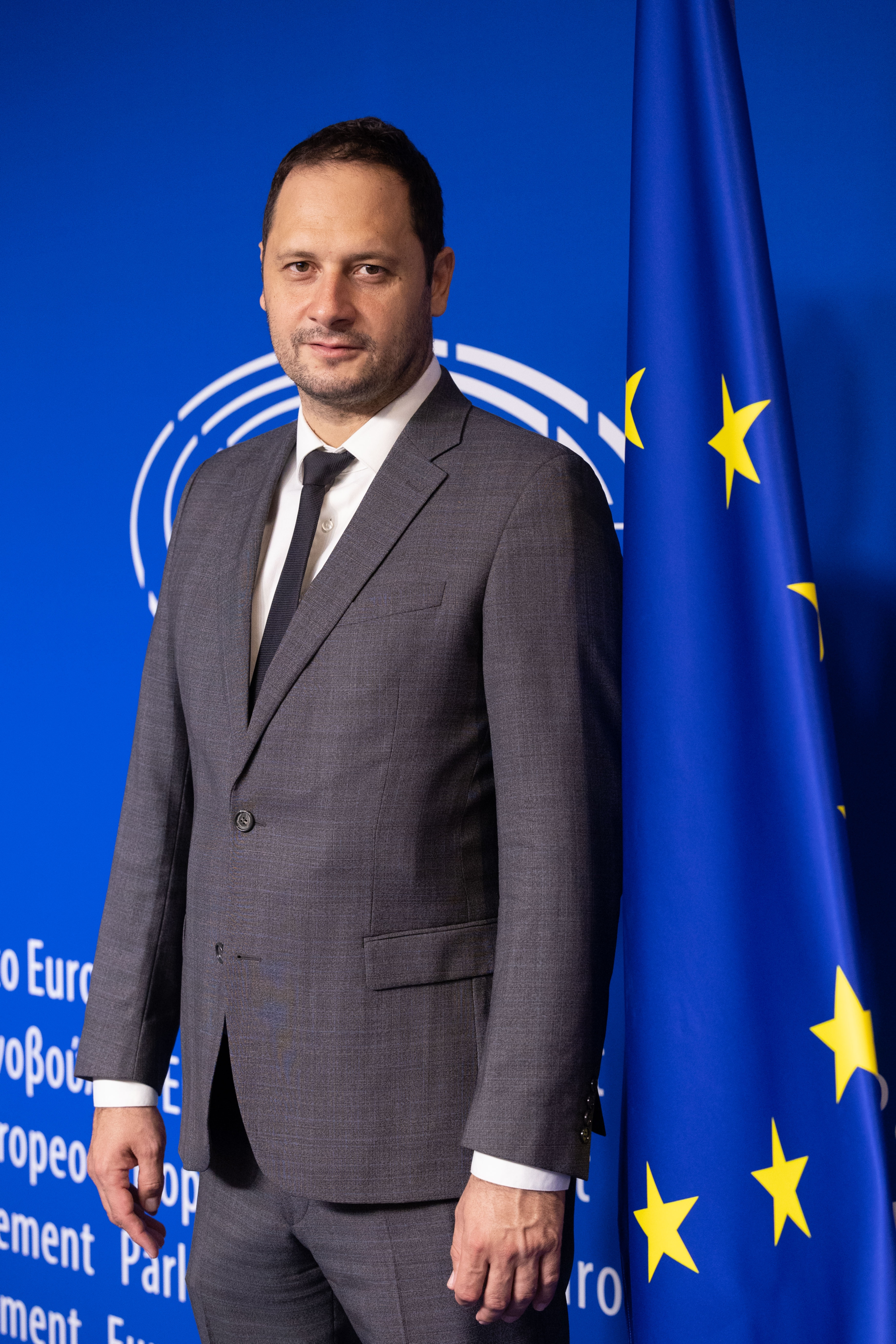

Member of the European Parliament for Bulgaria
- In office 2 July 2019 – 15 July 2024

Member of the National Assembly
- Incumbent
- Assumed office 30 April 2026
- Constituency: Pernik MMC
- In office 26 March 2017 – 2 July 2019
- Constituency: Sofia-25 MMC

Personal details
- Born: 18 April 1982 (age 44) Sliven, PR Bulgaria
- Party: Bulgarian Socialist Party (until 2026); Progressive Bulgaria (since 2026)
- Other political affiliations: Social Democratic Party of Germany; PES
- Education: Sofia University
- Occupation: Politician

Petar Bojkov Vitanov (Bulgarian: Петър Бойков Витанов, Pet'r Bojkov Vitanov, born 18 April 1982) is a Bulgarian politician and former member of the Bulgarian Socialist Party who served as Member of the Ninth European Parliament.

== Political career ==
=== Member of the European Parliament ===
==== Activity as an MEP ====
Upon his election as an MEP, Vitanov was selected as the leader of the BSP delegation in the European Parliament, which was criticised at the 2019 Congress by some members who claimed he was too inexperienced.

After the 2019 Bulgarian local elections Vitanov alerted the European Parliament about potential irregularities within the election process.

During the discussion of a "Just Transition"- the EU mechanism for the phaseout of fossil fuels by 2050- Vitanov made a number of amendments as the primary speaker for the Progressive Alliance of Socialists and Democrats Group in the European Parliament, which were meant to foster social mobility and equality between national producers.

Upon the granting of funds for Bulgaria through the "Next Generation" Plan, Vitanov accused the Third Borisov Government of not having a plan for how to invest the funds, and for not defending Bulgaria's interest in the European Council. Later, during the September protests calling for the resignation of the Borisov government, Vitanov voted in favour of a report compiled by LIBE, which condemned the Bulgarian government's handling of the protests.

In November, 2020, Vitanov criticised the Borisov government's handling of relations with North Macedonia, claiming they had "missed an opportunity" to better relations through the "Treaty for Good-Neighbourly Relations". He further criticised the government's handling of the COVID-pandemic, claiming that the government's poor planning led to Bulgaria having the lowest rate of vaccination in the EU.

In April, 2021, Vitanov accused the acting government of Borisov of approaching the "Plan for Recovery and Sustainability" irresponsibly, excluding measures to do with tourism, as well as lowering emission in transportation.

After the release of a European Commission report highlighting high levels of corruption in Bulgaria, Vitanov described it as "expected" and called for steps to be taken to implement judicial reform.

Vitanov alerted the LIBE commission after the release of videos showcasing alleged acts of police brutality during the summer protests against the Borisov Government.

In October 2021, Vitanov initiated a nonbinding resolution in which a majority of the European Parliament called for a ban on police use of facial recognition technology in public places, and on predictive policing.

During the discussion of the "Green Deal" by the European Parliament, Vitanov submitted amendments meant to insure that European airlines remained competitive, gas prices remained affordable and heating accessible. He further supported a lowering of the tax on Electric Vehicles.

Petar Vitanov voted against a resolution which would have made Russia "a sponsor of terrorism", arguing that it eliminated the possibility of negotiations.

Despite being expelled from the Bulgarian Socialist Party, Vitanov remained a member of the Socialists & Democrats Group in the EU parliament and also remained the head of the Bulgarian socialist delegation within the EU Parliament.

In parliament, Vitanov served on the Committee on the Environment, Public Health and Food Safety and the Committee on Transport and Tourism.

In addition to his committee assignments, he was part of parliament's delegations to the EU-Armenia Parliamentary Partnership Committee, the EU-Azerbaijan Parliamentary Cooperation Committee and the EU-Georgia Parliamentary Association Committee, and to the Euronest Parliamentary Assembly. He is also a member of the European Parliament Intergroup on LGBT Rights.

In April, 2024, he confirmed he would not seek re-election as an MEP in the 2024 European Parliament election.

==== Opposition to Korneliya Ninova within the Bulgarian Socialist Party ====
On 20 July, in an interview to BNT, Vitanov expressed his view that the election results of the Bulgarian Socialist Party in the July 2021 Bulgarian parliamentary election that "no socialist was satisfied with the election results" and called for "a deep analysis of the results" at an upcoming party meeting.

After the meeting of the National Council, Vitanov expressed the view that BSP must do more to work together with the "anti-corruption forces"- especially, Rumen Radev and the First Yanev Government- and undertake "ideological changes" to attract younger voters.

Vitanov- together with 5 other MEPs from Bulgaria- signed a declaration following Ninova's implication that BSP should not support Radev in the second round of the 2021 Bulgarian Presidential elections, calling for a "national voter mobilization" in support of Radev.

Soon after, Vitanov joined 64 other members of the BSP National Council who signed in favour of holding the Extraordinary Congress before Christmas, instead of as scheduled (on January 22).

Vitanov expressed some reservations about BSP's participation in the Petkov Government, stating that it was important that BSP "do not loose their identity" while participating in a "right-liberal government".

Before the January 2022 Congress, Vitanov expressed hope that the Congress would be "the beginning of a new direction for the party" and criticised Ninova for "making BSP the breeding ground for future Vazrazhdane voters due to spreading anti-European, nationalist and anti-vaxx messages". Vitanov called on the party to focus more on combatting income inequality within society and to unify behind "younger figures and new ideas".

Despite the failure of the motion to accept Ninova's resignation, Vitanov claimed that "change within the Bulgarian Socialist Party is inevitable" and called the decision of the Congress "a mistake".

After a visit to Berlin, to meet with members of the Social Democratic Party of Germany, Vitanov lamented that BSP had "fallen out" from the rest of "the socialist progressive family", but that he and others were working to return BSP to its "rightful place".

In June, 2022, Vitanov consistently called on BSP to stop "conflicts" with President Radev. Upon the fall of the Petkov government, he insisted that new elections were the best avenue, and that BSP must "come into them with ideological clarity".

After the 2022 Bulgarian parliamentary election, Vitanov signed a joint statement with Bulgarian MEPs Elena Yoncheva and Sergei Stanishev calling on Kornelia Ninova to resign as chairwoman of the party.

Vitanov further condemned the decision of BSP to vote in favour of the return of paper ballots on 15 November 2022.

During the emergency BSP conference on 10 February, the BSP leadership led by Kornelia Ninova motioned for Petar Vitanov's exclusion from the party- among with 20 other members of the "internal opposition". During the Congress, Vitanov made a statement demanding Ninova's resignation, if it did not take place he believed a "revolution" was inevitable. After the failure of the motion in favour of Ninova's resignation, Vitanov accused the current leadership of manipulating the votes. Afterwards, Vitanov joined a group of around 200 delegates who left the Congress in protest.

As a consequence of the Congress, Vitanov was expelled from BSP, among with 13 others. Vitanov promised to challenge his expulsion in court.

In an interview on 14 February, Vitanov stated that in his view he was expelled due to his criticism of the current parties leadership. In a further interview, Vitanov called the decision to expel him "repressive" and criticised BSP for "causing concern" within the European left with their "anti-European agenda".

On 29 March, Vitanov expressed his bewilderment with the recent actions of the BSP leadership and said that "BSP have hit a historical low".

In April, 2023, he further accused the BSP leadership of trying to "hide behind collective decision making" in order to covertly support a "right wing government".

In January, 2024, Vitanov claimed that the allegation that he had voted for the sending of lethal aid by Ninova was "made up" and posited that if Ninova remained as Chairman of BSP, the party was likely to disappear.

==== 3d of March initiative committee ====
On the 3d of September, 2023, Vitanov became a member of an Initiative Committee meant to organize a referendum to keep the 3d of March as the national holiday, together with other politicians who have been termed as "close to President Radev".

Despite speculation that the Initiative Committee was meant as a precursor for a future political party, Vitanov denied that during the opening meeting of the committee.

On 21 September 2023, the initiative committee officially submitted its intention to begin collecting signatures for the referendum.

On 10 December, Vitanov expressed the view that a party founded by President Radev was "needed", while still denying that any link existed between the Inititiave Committee and the President.

On 27 December, after the passing of the Constitutional Changes, Vitanov announced that the Initiative Committee will not submit the signatures they collected to the National Assembly, claiming that the Initiative Committee had "already accomplished its goal" and that raising the topic again within this time period may have dangerous concequences.

On 1 February, after President Radev hinted that he would indeed form a political party and the "Third of March Movement" was copyrighted, Vitanov claimed that the presidential institution was not involved in "political engineering" but instead a reflection of the peoples wish for new political forces.

=== Return to Bulgarian politics ===
==== Return to BSP ====
Following the resignation of Korneliya Ninova as BSP leader after the June 2024 Bulgarian parliamentary election, Vitanov was restored as a member of BSP and the National Council by the interim leadership.

In media statements following his restoration, he lamented that he did not consider himself a part of the newly formed leadership, and believed that more serious political intra-party reforms were necessary. Further, he opposed the expulsion of Korneliya Ninova believing that such a move created unnecessary divisions within the party.

Following the announcement of the party lists of the left-wing, BSP-led coalition BSP - United Left, Vitanov expressed reservations about them due to the lack of experienced socialist activists and the presence of figures with alleged links to Delyan Peevski. He further stated that he had severe doubts that the newly formed list could achieve a strong election result in the October 2024 Bulgarian parliamentary election.

Vitanov has been critical of the new leadership within the Bulgarian Socialist Party and has opposed the parties participation in the Zhelyazkov Government.

==== Progressive Bulgaria ====
Petar Vitanov campaigned for the Rumen Radev-led electoral coalition, Progressive Bulgaria, prior to the 2026 Bulgarian parliamentary election. He was elected as an MP representing the Pernik MMC.

Vitanov was chosen as the chairman of the Progressive Bulgaria parliamentary group in the National Assembly.

== Political positions ==
=== Views on economic and social issues within Bulgaria ===
Vitanov has opposed petitions to halt the construction of new areas in the Kozloduy Nuclear Power Plant.

Vitanov supported the 2020 anti-Borisov protests, and called for the resignation of the Borisov Government.

Vitanov has encouraged Bulgarians to vaccinate using the COVID-19 vaccine, and expressed support for the idea of a European-travel certificate to standardise travel requirements between different countries for the pandemic-period.

Vitanov supported the exemption made for Bulgaria in the 6th Anti-Russian Sanctions packet, which allowed Bulgaria to import Russian gas until the end of 2024.

Vitanov has consistently expressed his opposition to the Denkov Government seeing it an unprincipled and dangerous for the country.

Vitanov has also opposed the proposed change of the national holiday from the 3d of March (Liberation Day) to 24 May (Day of Enlightenment and the National Language).

=== Opinions on Artificial Intelligence and Green Deal ===
Vitanov, while accepting that artificial intelligence is likely to bring many benefits to society, argues that regulations are necessary to prevent negative impacts of AI (such as invasion of privacy by the state).

Vitanov, while being generally supportive of the Green New Deal and the goal of climate neutrality, has insisted that the phase out of fossil fuels can't take place at the expense of poor people.

=== Foreign policy views ===
In 2019, Vitanov expressed support for opening negotiations for the accession of Albania and the accession of North Macedonia to the European Union. In November, 2020, Vitanov announced his agreement with the position of the Bulgarian Socialist Party that negotiations with North Macedonia should not be started before bilateral issues are resolved. Vitanov has further stated that while "Bulgaria recognises the Macedonian identity and language", it is important to insure all provisions of the "Good Neighbourly Agreement" between the two countries are implemented before negotiations can be opened.

Vitanov has opposed the continuation of the Mechanism for Cooperation and Verification calling it discriminatory against new member-states and ineffective at overcoming rule of law issues.

After the outbreak of the 2022 Russian invasion of Ukraine, Vitanov voted in favour of imposing sanctions on the Russian Federation, however declared that he opposed the sending of lethal aid or the closing down of diplomatic channels with Russia. Vitanov further stated that "an armed solution to the war does not exist" and that sending armed aid constituted "direct involvement" in the conflict. During an interview on 30 April, he underlined that it was "impossible to be neutral in a situation with a victim and aggressor", however also stated that he "did not believe that sending arms contributed to a solution in the best way".

Vitanov has called for greater cooperation between the nations of Greece, Bulgaria and Romania within the EU, even calling for the formation of a "B3" modeled after the so-called "Visegrad Group".

=== Other political views ===
Vitanov has supported the implementation of a 30 km/h speed limit in residential areas, as well as stricter punishments for driving under the influence, to prevent traffick accidents.

Vitanov opposed the equalisation of Communism and Fascism in terms of guilt for the Second World War, which in his view diminishes the crimes of fascism and encourages the rehabilitation of neo-Nazi beliefs.
