= Atidzhe Alieva-Veli =

Bulgarian politician

Atidzhe Alieva-Veli MEP
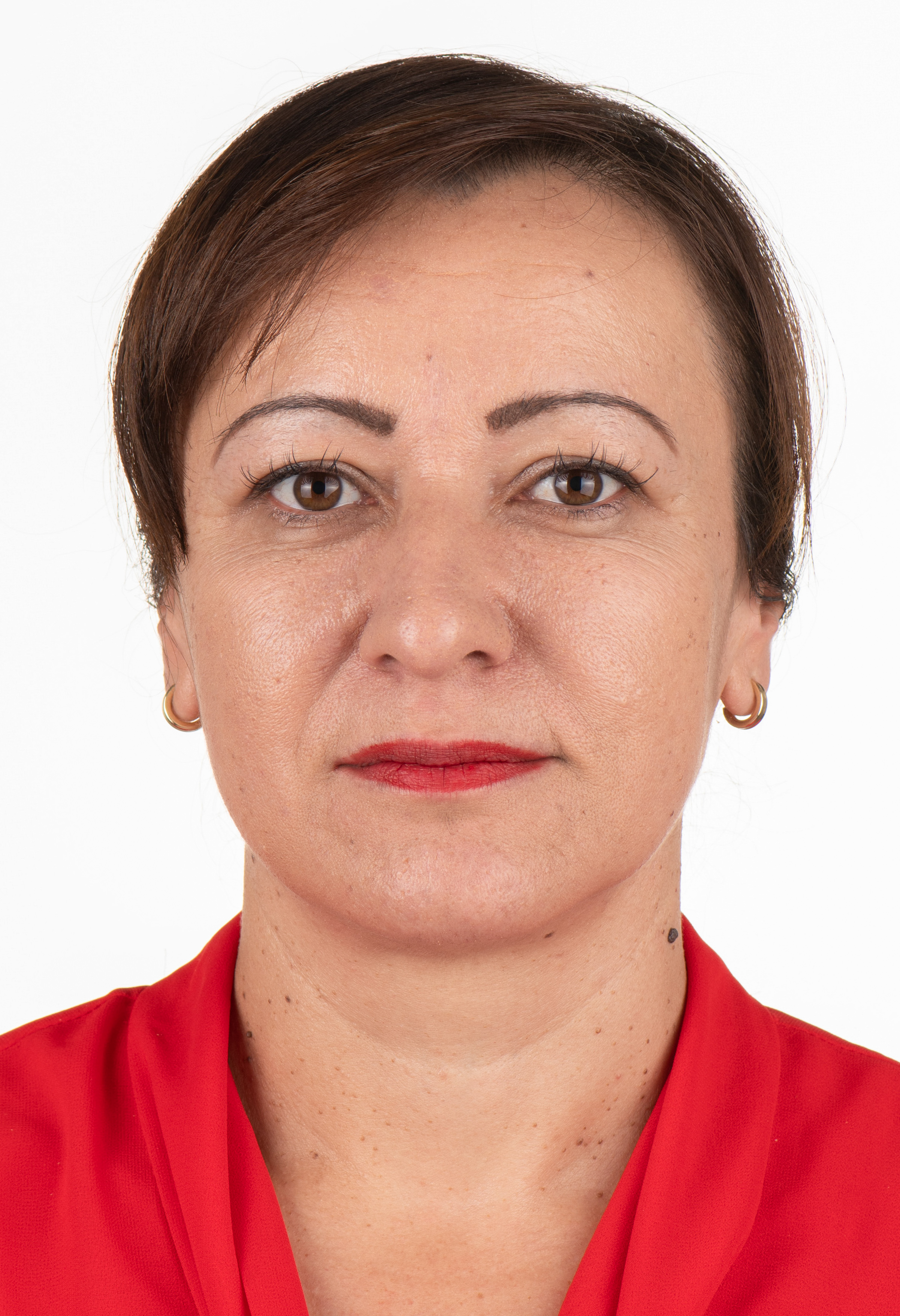

Member of the European Parliament for Bulgaria
- In office 1 July 2019 – 15 July 2024

Personal details
- Born: 18 September 1981 (age 44) Devin, Bulgaria
- Party: Movement for Rights and Freedoms

Atidzhe Alieva-Veli (Bulgarian: Атидже Алиева-Вели) (born 1981) is a Bulgarian politician of the Movement for Rights and Freedoms who has been serving as a Member of the European Parliament since 2019.

== Early life and education ==
Alieva-Veli was born on 18 September in Devin, but grew up in Borino. After finishing school, she studied biotechnology for a bachelor's degree until 2003, followed by a degree in industrial biotechnology at Sofia University until 2005. In early 2014, she completed a second master's degree in Public Administration at the University of National and World Economy in Sofia.

== Professional career ==
Alieva-Veli started her professional career in the Bulgarian branch of Danone. In 2011, she began working for the State Agricultural Fund (SFA), and from 2013 she was one of several deputy directors.

== Political career ==
In parliament, Alieva-Veli has since been serving on the Committee on Agriculture and Rural Development (since 2020) and the Committee on Employment and Social Affairs (2019-2020). In addition to her committee assignments, she is part of the Parliament's delegation to the EU-Kazakhstan, EU-Kyrgyzstan, EU-Uzbekistan and EU-Tajikistan Parliamentary Cooperation Committees and for relations with Turkmenistan and Mongolia.
