= Denitsa Simeonova =

Bulgarian politician

- Деница Симеонова
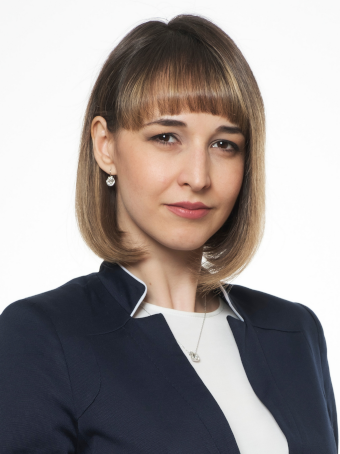
- Official portrait, 2021

Member of the National Assembly
- Incumbent
- Assumed office 3 December 2021
- Constituency: 6th MMC - Vratsa

Personal details
- Born: 4 May 1992 (age 34) Vratsa, Bulgaria
- Party: We Continue the Change
- Education: Technical University of Sofia
- Occupation: politician; engineer

Denitsa Dimitrova Simeonova is a Bulgarian politician, engineer and entrepreneur who is currently a Member of the National Assembly. Having previously served as the Chief of Staff at the Ministry of Finance, she was among the founders of the PP party.
