= Maria Walsh =

Maria Walsh may refer to:

- Maiara Walsh (born 1988), Brazilian American actress and singer
- María Elena Walsh (1930–2011), Argentine known for her songs and books for children
- Maria Walsh (politician) (born 1987), Irish Member of the European Parliament, and winner of the 2014 Rose of Tralee
