= 2024 Bulgarian parliamentary election =

2024 Bulgarian parliamentary election may refer to:

- June 2024 Bulgarian parliamentary election
- October 2024 Bulgarian parliamentary election
