= Iskra Mihaylova =

Bulgarian politician (born 1957)

- Искра Михайлова
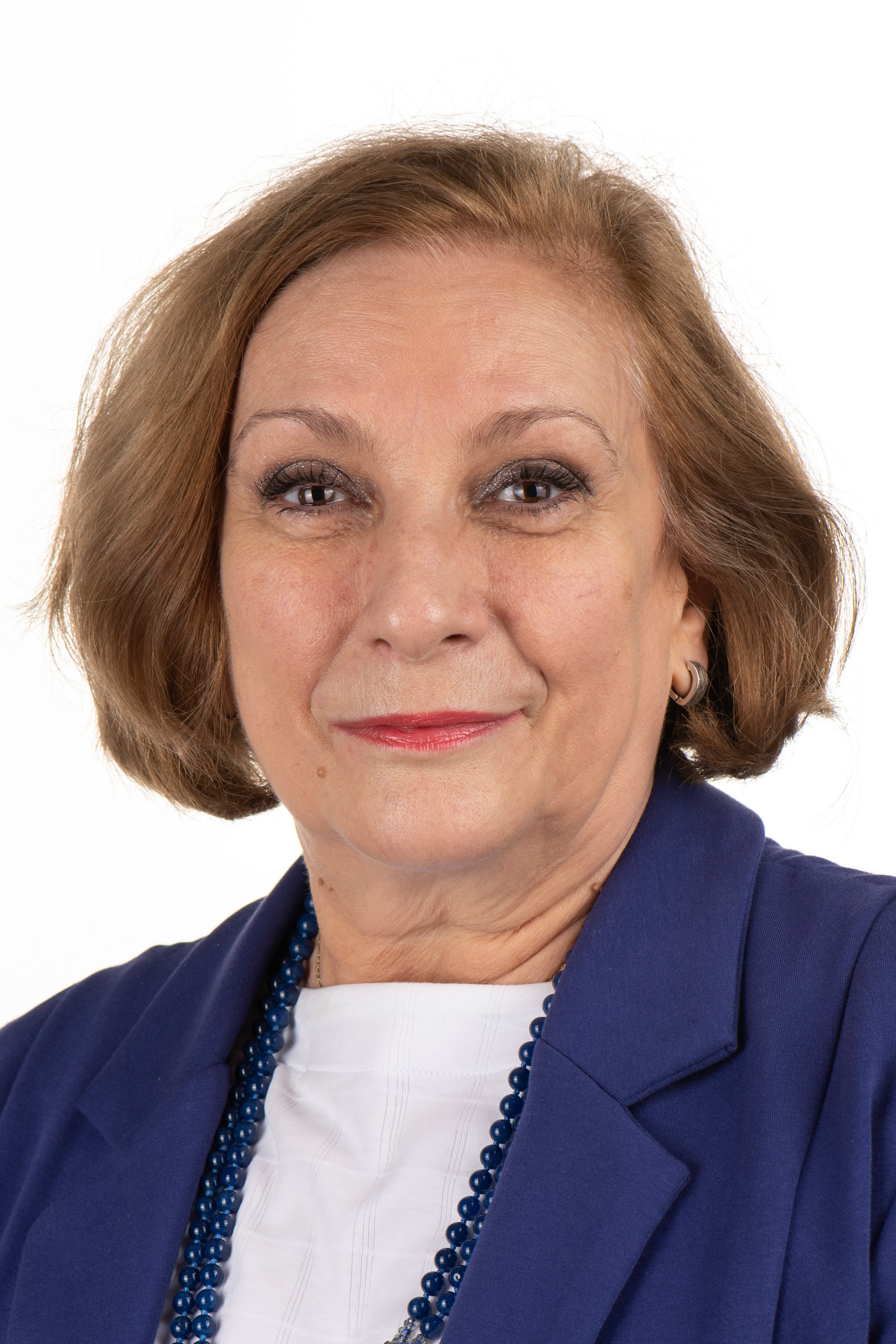

Member of the National Assembly
- Incumbent
- Assumed office 19 June 2024
- Constituency: 13th MMC – Pazardzhik
- In office 14 July 2009 – 29 May 2013
- Constituency: 13th MMC – Pazardzhik

Member of the European Parliament
- In office 1 July 2014 – 19 June 2024
- Constituency: Bulgaria

Chair of the European Parliament Regional Development Committee
- In office 7 July 2014 – 1 July 2019
- Preceded by: Anneli Jäätteenmäki
- Succeeded by: Younous Omarjee

Personal details
- Born: Iskra Dimitrova Mihaylova; 7 September 1957 (age 69) Sofia, Bulgaria
- Party: Movement for Rights and Freedoms (disputed)
- Other political affiliations: DPS - A New Beginning; ALDE (until 2024)
- Education: University of Sofia
- Website: www.iskramihaylova.eu

Iskra Dimitrova Mihaylova-Koparova (Bulgarian: Искра Димитрова Михайлова-Копарова; born 7 September 1957) is a Bulgarian politician and Member of the European Parliament (MEP) from Bulgaria who has been a Member of the European Parliament since July 2014. She is a member of the Movement for Rights and Freedoms, part of the Alliance of Liberals and Democrats for Europe Party.

== Early life and education ==
Mihaylova earned a master's degree in Library Studies and Information Technologies from the Saint-Petersburg State University of Culture and Arts in 1980. She trained as a librarian and bibliographer at the State Library Institute of Bulgaria and then at the Leningrad Institute of Culture.

== Career ==
Mihaylova worked for the SS. Cyril and Methodius National Library from 1980 to 1996. In 1996, Mihaylova was an American Library Association Fellow working at the Colorado State Library.

== Political career ==
In parliament, Mihaylova has been serving as chair of the Committee on Regional Development.

In addition to her committee assignments, Mihaylova is part of the parliament's delegations to the EU-Armenia and EU-Azerbaijan Parliamentary Cooperation Committees and the EU-Georgia Parliamentary Association Committee, to the EU-Former Yugoslav Republic of Macedonia Joint Parliamentary Committee and to the Euronest Parliamentary Assembly. She is also a member of the European Parliament Intergroup on Small and Medium-Sized Enterprises (SMEs).

In June 2019, Mihaylova was elected vice-president of the political group Renew Europe.

== Recognition ==
Mihaylova was the winner of the Regional Development Award at the 2017 MEP Awards.
