= Stanislav Stoyanov (politician) =

Bulgarian politician (born 1981)

- Станислав Стоянов
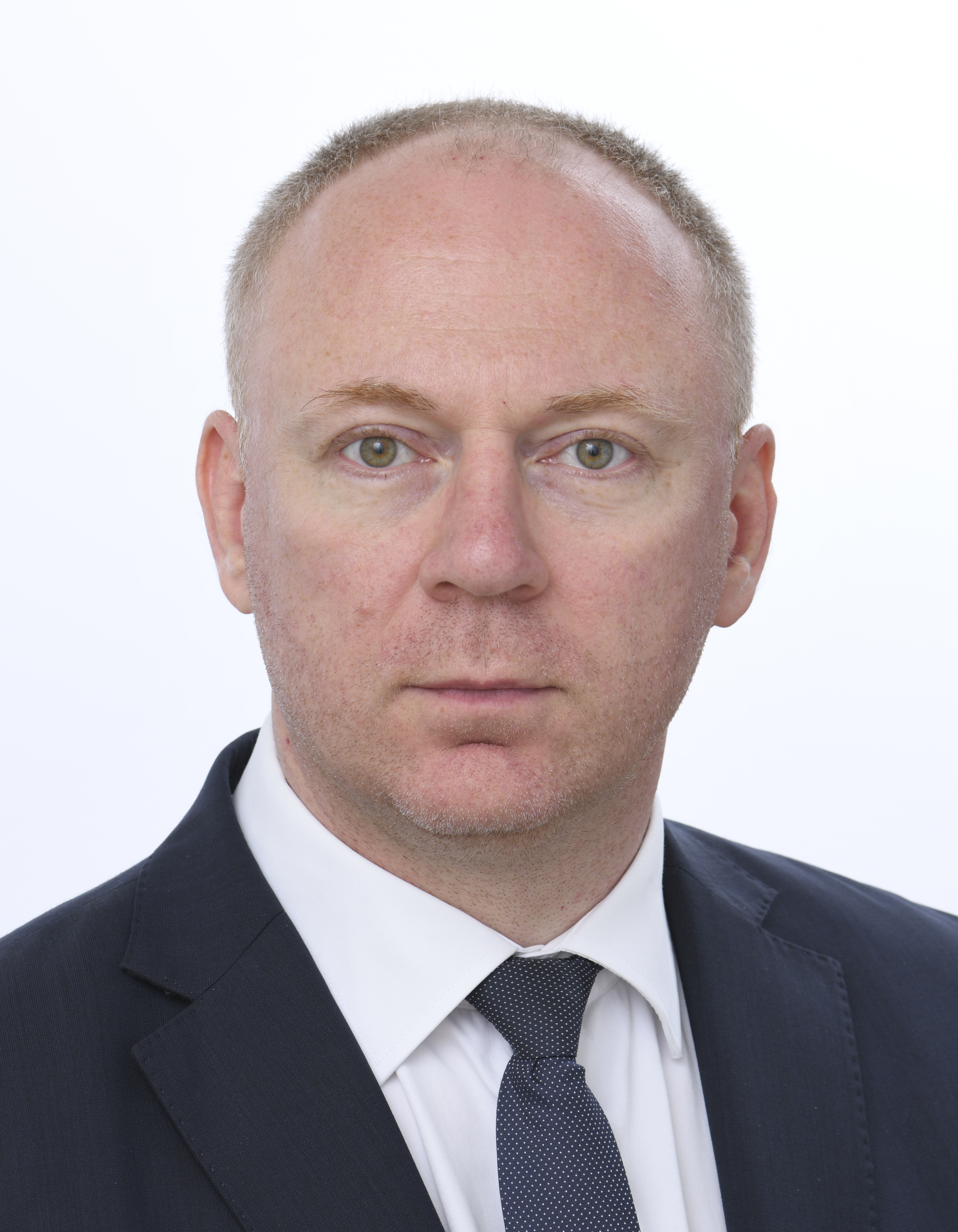
- Official portrait, 2024

Member of the European Parliament for Bulgaria
- Incumbent
- Assumed office 16 July 2024

Chairperson of the Europe of Sovereign Nations party
- Incumbent
- Assumed office 17 January 2025

Member of the National Assembly
- In office 19 October 2022 – 19 June 2024
- Constituency: 4th MMC - Veliko Tarnovo

Personal details
- Born: Stanislav Dobrinov Stoyanov; 5 April 1981 (age 45) Varna, PR Bulgaria
- Party: Revival (since 2014)
- Other political affiliations: Europe of Sovereign Nations
- Education: Veliko Tarnovo University; University of Liège
- Occupation: Politician; business analyst

Stanislav Dobrinov Stoyanov (Bulgarian: Станислав Добринов Стоянов, born 5 April 1981) is a Bulgarian politician who is currently an MEP following the 2024 European Parliament election. A member of the Revival party, he served as Member of the National Assembly from 2022 to 2024. In January 2025, he was elected as chairman of the Europe of Sovereign Nations (party).
