= 2019 European Parliament election in Bulgaria =

- 26 May 2019

All 17 Bulgarian seats in the European Parliament
- Turnout: 32.64% ▼
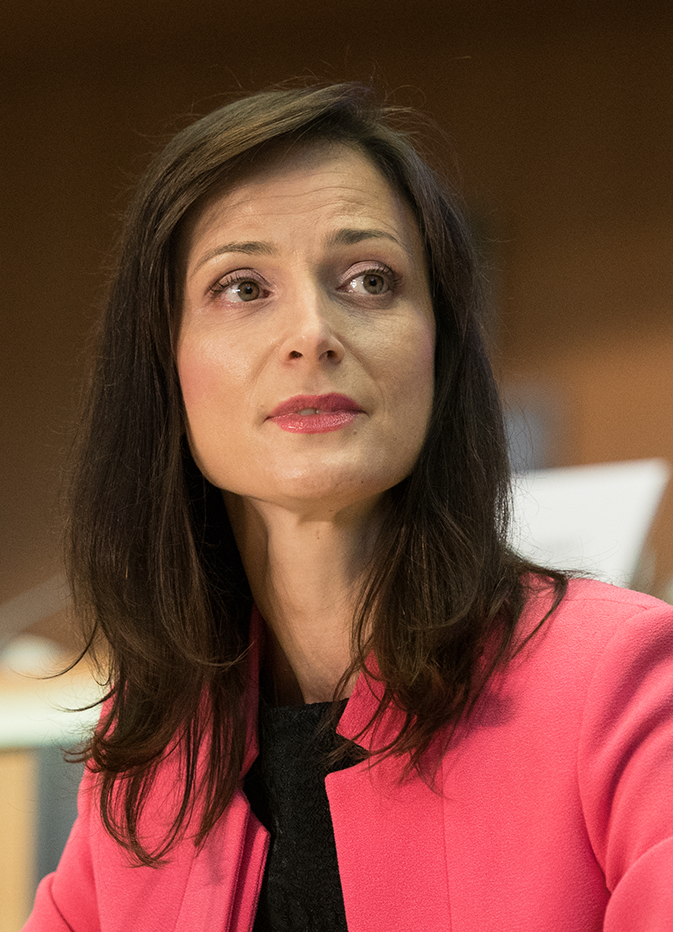

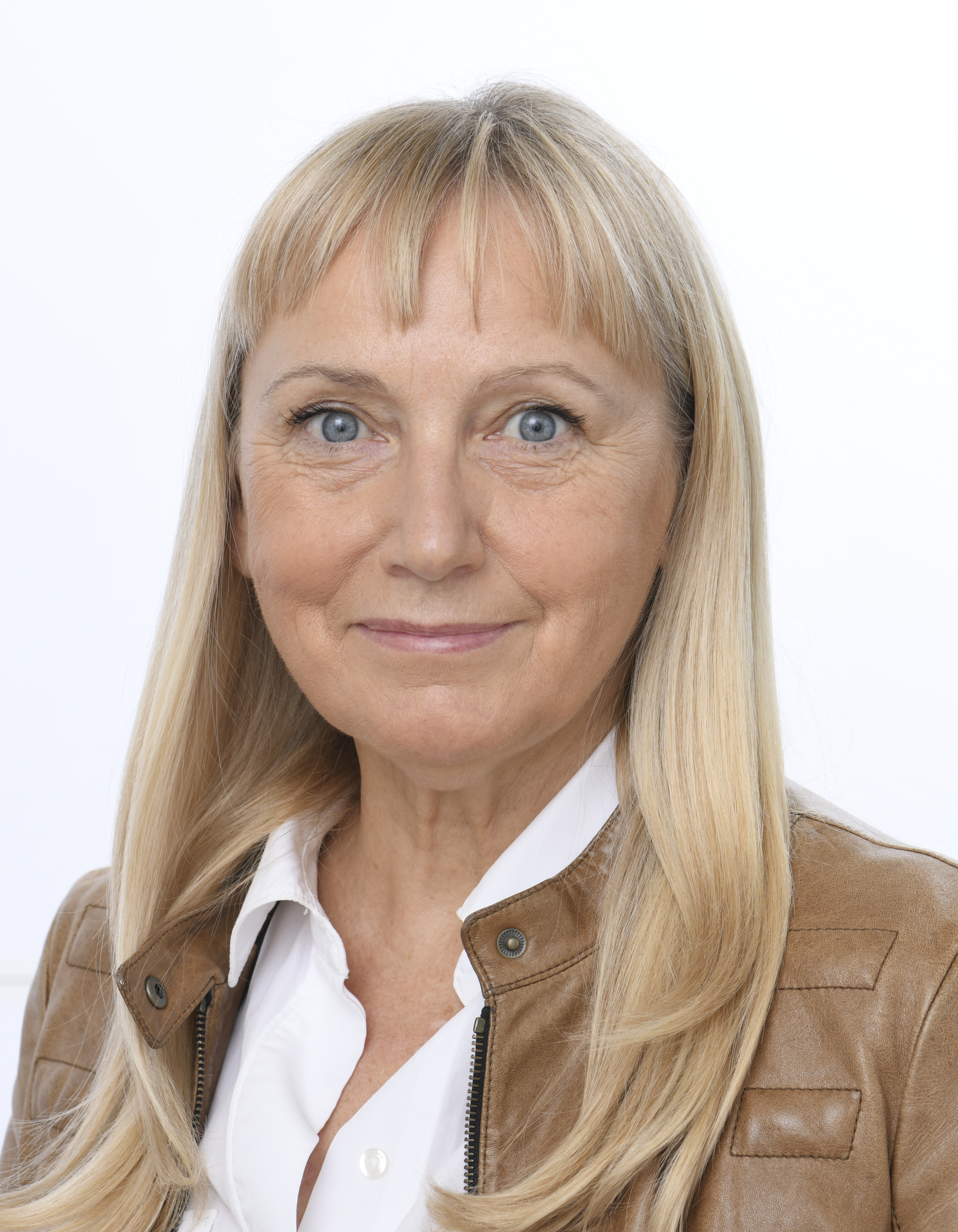

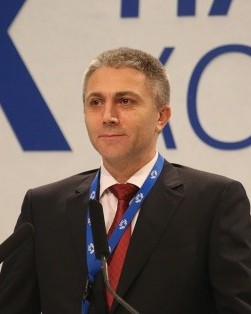

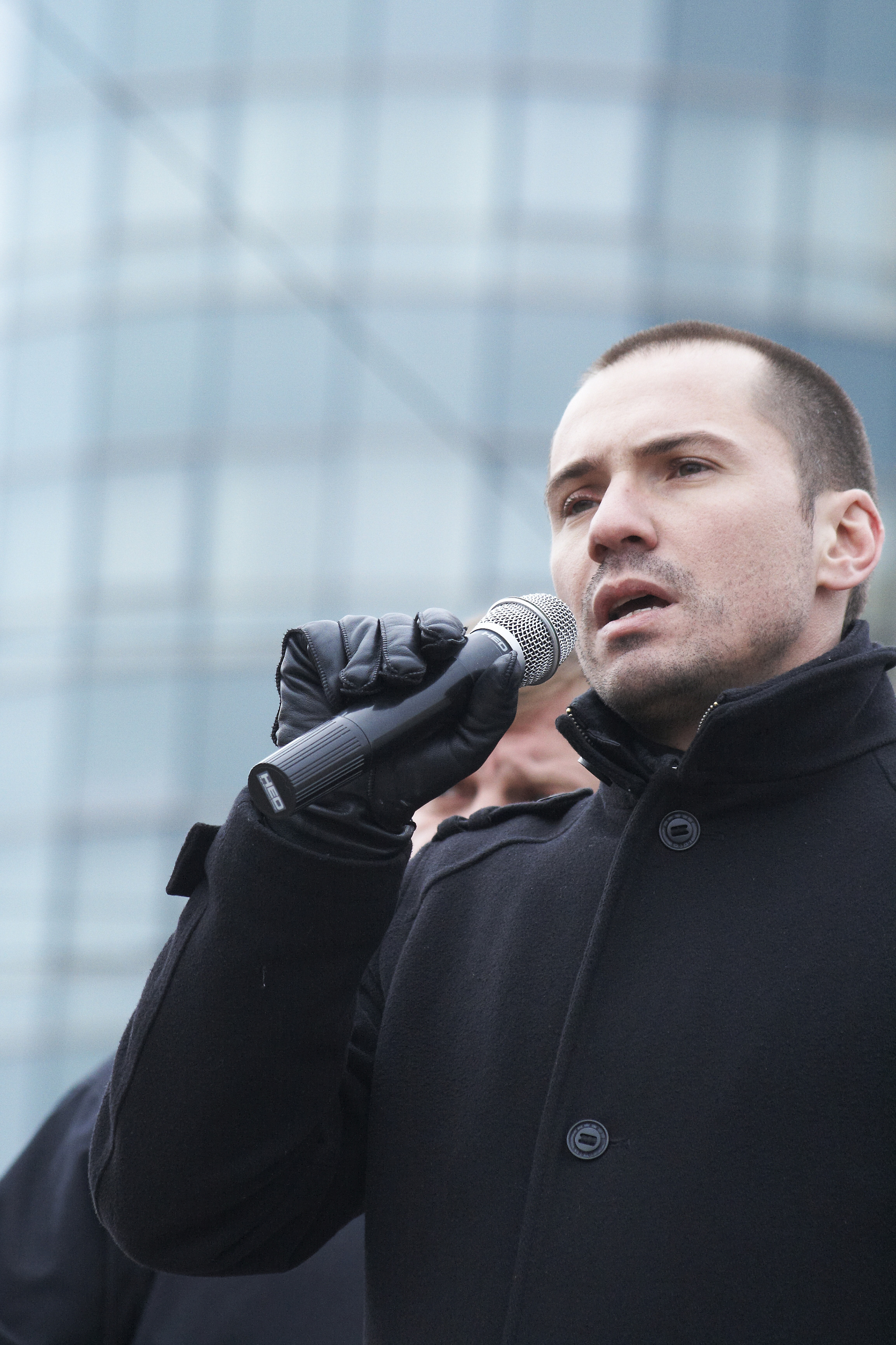

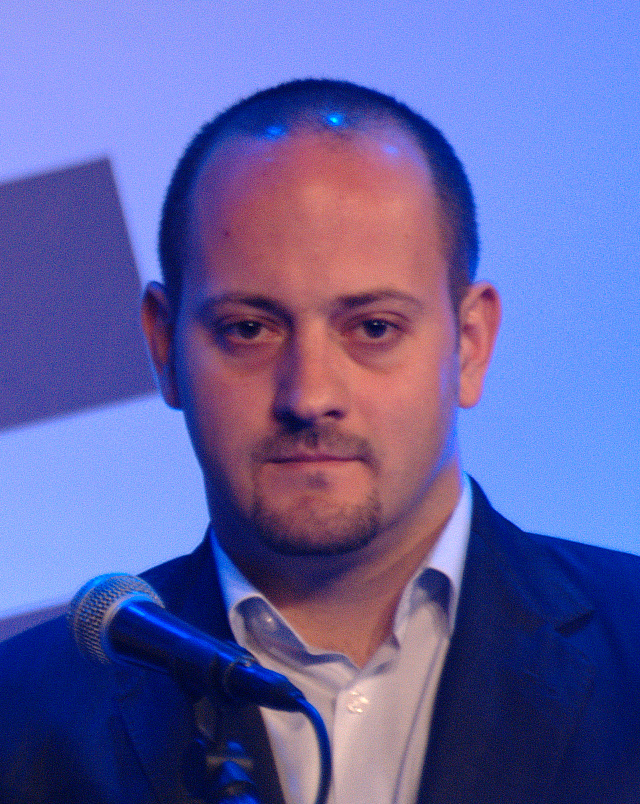

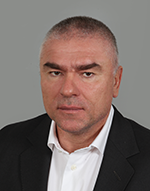
	First party	Second party	Third party
Leader	Mariya Gabriel	Elena Yoncheva	Mustafa Karadayi
Party	GERB—SDS	BSP	DPS
Alliance	EPP	S&D	ALDE
Last election	30.40%	18.93%	17.27%
Seats before	6 seats	4 seats	4 seats
Seats won	6	5	3
Seat change	Steady	▲1	▼1
Popular vote	607,194	474,160	323,510
Percentage	31.07%	24.26%	16.55%
Swing	▲0.67	▲5.33	▼0.72
	Fourth party	Fifth party	Sixth party
Leader	Angel Dzhambazki	Radan Kanev	Veselin Mareshki
Party	VMRO	DB	Volya
Alliance	ECR	EPP	ID
Last election	10.66%	6.45%	—
Seats before	2 seats	1 seats	—
Seats won	2	1	0
Seat change	▲1	Steady	Steady
Popular vote	143,830	118,484	70,830
Percentage	7.36%	6.06%	3.62%
Swing	▼3.30	▼0.39	New

The election of the 5th delegation from Bulgaria to the European Parliament was held on 26 May 2019. All seats were up for election. The country forms a single constituency, with members elected by proportional representation using open lists.

== Outgoing delegation ==
Bulgarian parties in the European Parliament in the eighth legislature (2014–2019)
Group	17	National party	17
EPP	7	GERB	6
EPP	7	Democrats for a Strong Bulgaria (DSB)	1
PES	4	Bulgarian Socialist Party (BSP)	4
ALDE	4	Movement for Rights and Freedoms (DPS)	4
ECR	2	Bulgaria Without Censorship	1
ECR	2	IMRO – BNM (VMRO)	1

== Opinion polls ==
=== Vote share ===
The opinion poll results below were recalculated from the original data and exclude polls that chose "I will not vote" or "I am uncertain" options.

Fieldwork date	Polling firm	Sample size	GERB SDS	BSP	DPS	VMRO	NFSB	Attack	ABV	DB	Volya	Others	NOTA	Lead
25 May 2014	2014 EU Election		30.4 (Note: Results for GERB only; SDS appeared separately in 2014 and 2017 as part of the Reformist Bloc.)	18.9 (Note: As part of Coalition for Bulgaria.)	17.3	10.7 (Note: As part of a coalition between Bulgaria Without Censorship, VMRO and several smaller parties.)	3.1	3.0	4.0	—N/a	—N/a	12.7	–	11.5
26 March 2017	2017 Election		32.7	27.2 (Note: As part of BSP for Bulgaria.)	9.0	9.1			1.6 (Note: As ABV-Movement 21)	5.4 (Note: Combined results for DSB and DaB)	4.2	8.3	2.5	5.5
20–25 Jul 2018	Barometer	846	36.1	29.4	15.3	17.4			–	–	–	1.8	–	6.8
2-7 Nov 2018	AFIS	1010	30.2	32.2	12.0	4.6			–	–	2.3	9.2	9.5	2.0
10-17 Dec 2018	Exacta	1000	35.8	31.7	7.8	5.8			1.5	3.8	1.5	12.2	–	4.1
14-19 Dec 2018	Alpha Research	1027	33.2	30.9	10.6	6.0			–	5.6	3.9	9.8	–	2.3
10-17 Jan 2019	Trend	1008	33.3	31.1	12.6	6.4			–	3.6	2.9	10.1	–	2.2
12-21 Jan 2019	Market Links	1007	37.8	27.1	10.0	8.5			–	6.5	1.3	8.7	–	10.7
14-19 Jan 2019	AFIS	1010	32.9	34.6	11.0	4.7			–	1.4	1.4	6.0	8.0	1.7
17-21 Jan 2019	Sova Harris	985	37.7 (Note: Combined results for GERB and SDS)	32.6	9.4	1.2	1.4	3.0	1.4	3.2	2.9	7.1	–	5.0
26 Jan-1 Feb 2019	Mediana	810	35.0	33.0	4.9	10.6			3.0	2.8	3.2	7.1	–	2.0
5-13 Feb 2019	Trend	1007	33.6	31.2	11.7	6.8			–	4.1	2.7	3.2	6.6	2.4
15-25 Feb 2019	Market Links	1018	37.3	32.8	7.3	4.6			–	7.3	1.5	9.2	–	4.5
19-28 Feb 2019	Exacta	1000	35.1	29.0	10.3	9.6			1.5	3.7	1.5	9.3	–	6.1
22-28 Feb 2019	AFIS	1010	31.1	36.9	12.8	7.2			–	1.6	–	4.2	4.5	5.8
6-11 Mar 2019	Sova Harris	1000	38.2	30.6	11.5	3.0	1.3	3.0	1.3	3.2	3.3	1.3	3.5	7.6
6-13 Mar 2019	Trend	1005	33.6	30.4	12.1	4.4	1.7	2.3	–	4.4	3.2	3.0	4.9	3.2
22-26 Mar 2019	Alpha Research	1011	33.9	33.4	10.6	4.1	2.2	2.1	1.2	5.1	1.9	5.5	–	0.5
4-9 Apr 2019	Mediana	1001	31.5	32.1	9.5	4.4	2.1	3.8	3.1	2.9	4.9	5.8	–	0.6
5-11 Apr 2019	Gallup International	1015	31.0	32.1	11.1	5.0	1.4	1.9	1.5	4.5	3.5	5.8	2.2	1.1
5-12 Apr 2019	Trend	1008	30.5	31.3	12.7	5.5	1.3	2.0	1.3	4.3	3.6	3.1	4.4	0.8
12-22 Apr 2019	Market Links	1049	35.3	35.8	7.0	5.7	–	–	–	5.3	1.9	8.8	–	0.5
16-22 Apr 2019	Sova Harris	995	36.1	35.0	11.4	4.0	–	3.0	1.3	2.1	4.0	3.0	–	1.1
26 Apr 2019	Start of official election campaign													
20-30 Apr 2019	Alpha Research	1015	32.2	32.7	9.3	6.0	1.7	1.2	1.2	4.5	1.7	7.3	2.2	0.5
29 Apr-4 May 2019	Specter	834	32.5	33.2	8.5	4.2	4.0	1.2	2.7	4.2	1.9	4.5	3.1	0.7
2-7 May 2019	Mediana	1008	29.9	31.9	10.7	4.7	3.9	2.6	3.8	3.4	4.9	4.2	–	2.0
7-14 May 2019	Specter	993	33.0	33.4	8.7	4.1	4.1	1.3	3.5	4.1	1.7	3.3	2.7	0.4
8–13 May 2019	Sova Harris	1000	34.4	33.5	13.7	4.4	–	3.8	1.5	2.1	4.7	1.9	–	0.9
10-15 May 2019	AFIS	1604	24.5	25.7	13.2	4.4	1.6	2.6	3.2	2.5	5.5	6.7	8.7	1.2
11–17 May 2019	Trend	1007	31.5	30.4	12.8	5.8	1.3	2.0	2.4	4.2	4.8	2.5	2.3	1.1
11–19 May 2019	Market Links	1024	33.8	31.4	7.9	6.5	2.4	–	1.4	5.4	3.3	7.9	–	2.4
17–21 May 2019	Mediana	1008	31.1	29.8	11.4	5.6	2.6	3.5	3.6	2.6	5.1	4.7		1.3
18–22 May 2019	Exacta	1000	32.4	27.3	13.3	6.5	2.0	2.0	1.8	4.3	4.5	5.9	–	5.1
19–22 May 2019	Alpha Research	1016	31.1	26.6	13.9	6.0	2.0	2.0	3.2	4.2	4.9	6.1	–	4.5
26 May 2019	Election results		30.1	23.5	16.1	7.1	1.1	1.0	0.8	5.9	3.5	7.8	3.0	6.6

== Results ==
Party	Votes	%	Seats	+/–
GERB—SDS	607,194	30.13	6	0
Bulgarian Socialist Party	474,160	23.53	5	+1
Movement for Rights and Freedoms	323,510	16.05	3	–1
IMRO – Bulgarian National Movement	143,830	7.14	2	+1
Democratic Bulgaria	118,484	5.88	1	+1
Volya Movement	70,830	3.51	0	New
Patriots for Valeri Simeonov (NFSB–SEK)	22,421	1.11	0	0
NDSV–New Time	21,315	1.06	0	0
Attack	20,906	1.04	0	0
Revival	20,319	1.01	0	New
Coalition for Bulgaria	16,759	0.83	0	0
Democrats for Responsibility, Solidarity and Tolerance	7,130	0.35	0	New
People's Voice	6,136	0.30	0	0
Party of Greens	6,051	0.30	0	0
Movement 21	4,141	0.21	0	New
Reload Bulgaria	3,907	0.19	0	New
Together Movement	3,731	0.19	0	New
VOLT	3,500	0.17	0	New
Direct Democracy	2,425	0.12	0	New
Bulgarian National Unification	2,370	0.12	0	New
Rise (RDP–ENP–BNF Chicago–SSD–BDS R)	1,855	0.09	0	New
Independents	73,317	3.64	0	0
None of the above	61,029	3.03	–	–
Total	2,015,320	100.00	17	0
Valid votes	2,015,320	96.17		
Invalid/blank votes	80,238	3.83		
Total votes	2,095,558	100.00		
Registered voters/turnout	6,378,694	32.85		
Source: CIK

== See also ==
- Bulgaria (European Parliament constituency)
