= Tsvetelina Penkova =

Bulgarian politician

Tsvetelina Penkova MEP
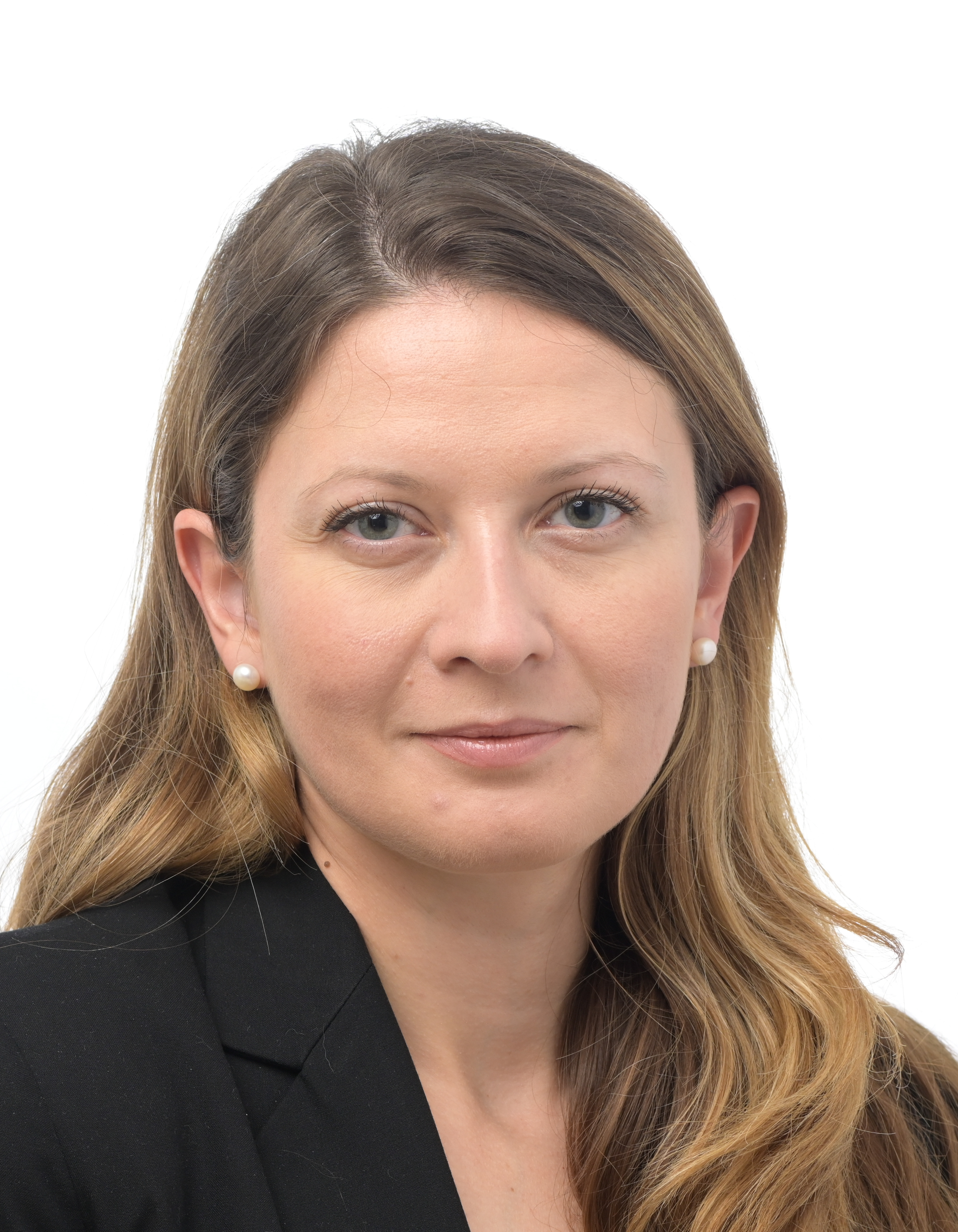

Member of the European Parliament for Bulgaria
- Incumbent
- Assumed office 2 July 2019

Personal details
- Born: 19 February 1988 (age 38) Sofia, Bulgaria
- Party: Bulgarian Socialist Party

Tsvetelina Marinova Penkova (Bulgarian: Цветелина Маринова Пенкова, born 19 February 1988) is a Bulgarian politician who has been serving as a Member of the European Parliament since the 2019 elections.

== Biography ==
Tsvetelina Penkova was born on 19 February 1988 in Sofia, Bulgaria where she grew up and completed her education at the American College. Penkova graduated with a double degree in International Business from the Central European University in Budapest, Hungary and Bocconi University, in Milan. She completed a semester abroad in Montreal, at McGill University. Penkova is also an alumna of the Saïd Business School at the University of Oxford where she obtained a MSc in Financial Economics.

From January 2017 until her election to the European Parliament in 2019, Penkova worked at Hayfin Capital Management in London serving as a Business Development and Investor Relations Associate. Prior to that, she held the position of Capital Markets Analyst at the Royal Bank of Scotland. At the same time, Penkova was a co-founder of Millenium Club Bulgaria, an international think tank for Bulgarians born after 1981 and working for the development of Bulgaria by creating a bridge between the Bulgarians at home and outside of the country.

== Political career ==
In 2019, Penkova transitioned into politics, affiliating herself with the Bulgarian Socialist Party (BSP) where she had been a previous member of. The party subsequently positioned her fourth on their candidate list for that year’s European elections. Following the 2019 European Parliament elections, the BSP witnessed an uptick in their vote share by 5.5%, securing five out of Bulgaria’s 17 mandates. This outcome ensured Penkova’s election to the European Parliament in her inaugural political contest.

=== Member of the European Parliament, 2019 - present ===
In parliament, Tsvetelina Penkova has been serving on the Committee on Industry, Research and Energy and the Committee on Regional Development. She is also Vice-Chair of the Delegation to the EU-UK Parliamentary Partnership Assembly and a member of the Delegation for relations with Japan. Penkova serves as a substitute on the Committee on Budgetary Control, the Committee on the Internal Market and Consumer Protection as well the Delegation for relations with the countries of Southeast Asia and the Association of Southeast Asian Nations (ASEAN).
