= Elena Yoncheva =

Bulgarian journalist

Elena Yoncheva MEP
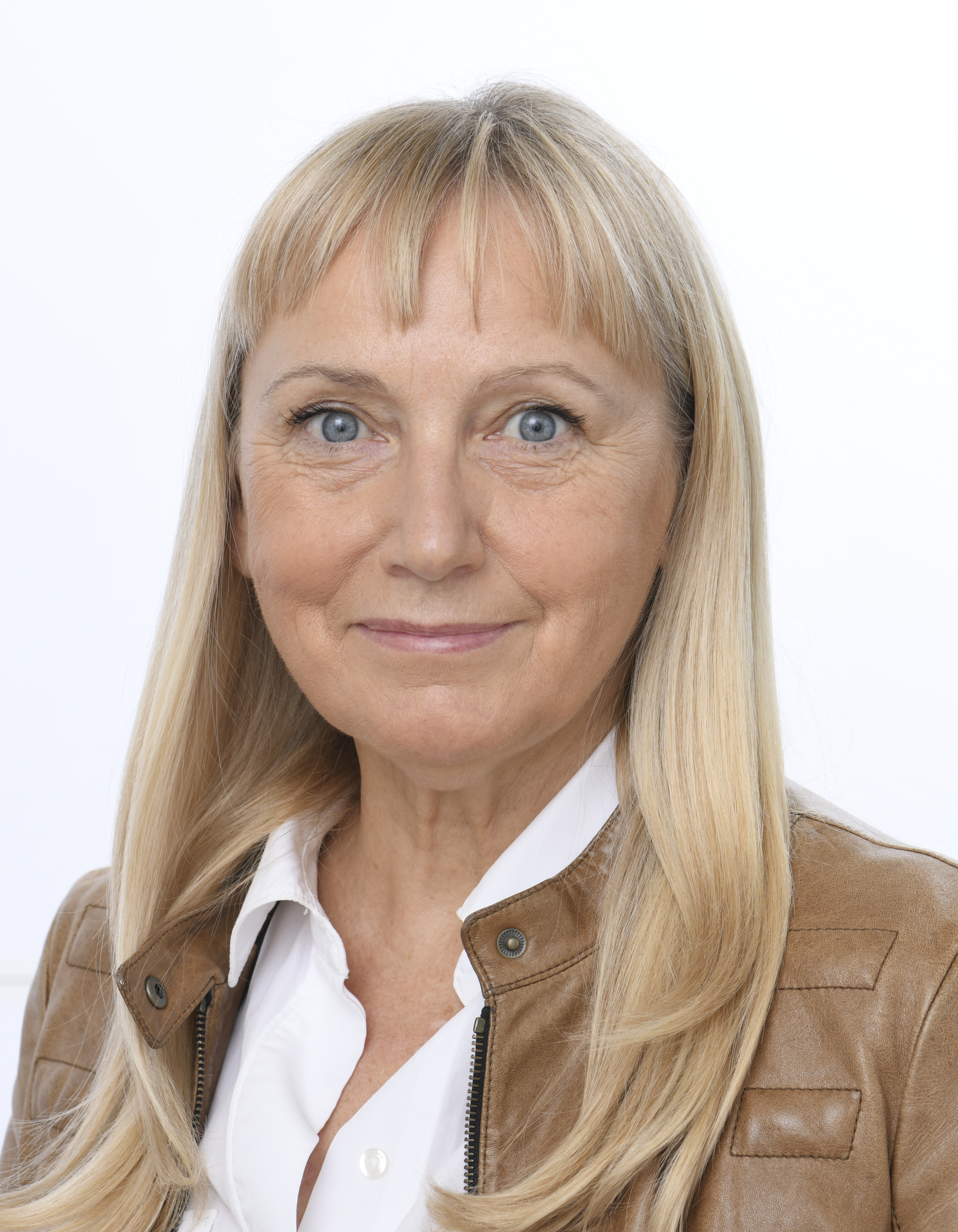
- Official portrait, 2024

Member of the European Parliament for Bulgaria
- Incumbent
- Assumed office 2 July 2019

Member of the National Assembly
- In office 19 April 2017 – 1 July 2019

Personal details
- Born: Elena Nikolova Yoncheva; 27 May 1964 (age 62) Sofia, Bulgaria
- Party: DPS (since 2024)
- Other political affiliations: BSP (2017–2024)
- Domestic partner(s): Sergey Stanishev (1994–2009)
- Education: Moscow State University
- Occupation: Journalist • Politician

Elena Nikolova Yoncheva (Bulgarian: Елена Николова Йончева; born 27 May 1964) is a Bulgarian freelance journalist and politician who has been serving as a Member of the European Parliament since 2019.

A former Bulgarian National Television correspondent, Yoncheva has reported from many conflict areas, and has authored more than 25 TV documentaries on these conflicts.

== Early life ==
Yoncheva was born on 27 May 1964 in Sofia, to a Bulgarian father, Nikola, and a Russian mother, Larisa. She datеd Sergey Stanishev, former Prime Minister of Bulgaria, between 1994 and 2009; they had known each other since their student years in Moscow, Russia.

== Career in journalism ==
Yoncheva has reported from Kosovo, Algeria, Chechnya, Israel, Somalia, Afghanistan, Iraq, Venezuela, Colombia and other hot spots. Yoncheva has also authored a documentary on the Bulgarian Antarctic base, the Roma in Lom and on other topics.

After filming the war in Donbas she was informed that she was not allowed to enter the country anymore. While covering the Iraq War in 2003, she was captured by armed civilians, but was quickly rescued by an Iraqi official and did not suffer serious injuries. In June 2013, she was injured by a tear-gas grenade while reporting from Istanbul, Turkey.

In 2008, she became a participant in bTV's television series Dancing Stars. Since October 2013, she is co-anchor of TV7's show The Original, together with Ivan Garelov.

=== Documentaries ===
- Sarajevo (September 1993)
- Albania Today (November 1993)
- The New Colors of South Africa (May 1994)
- The White Wolves (November 1995) -Covers "foreign mercenaries and volunteers from Russia, Bulgaria, France in the Special Actions Unit of the Serb Army in Bosnia"
- Terror (January 1996) - Covers the First Chechen War
- Welcome to Afghanistan (December 1996)
- Anatomy of Horror (April 1998) - Covers Islamist Fundamentalist terrorism in Algeria
- Border Line (April 1999) - Covers "the development of the Kosovo crisis"
- Shto Sakash? (What do you want?) (July 2001) -Covers "the conflict with NLA - National Liberation Army in Macedonia"
- Join the Team (The Game) (2002)-Six-part mini-series covering the lives of Bulgarian Roma
- The Border - A denouncement the trafficking of migrants through Bulgaria, which is allegedly facilitated by Bulgarian authorities.

== Member of the European Parliament, 2019–present ==
Yoncheva was elected to the European Parliament on the Bulgarian Socialist Party ticket, during the 2019 European Parliament election in Bulgaria. As part of her campaign for a Member of the European Parliament, she shared evidence allegedly proving corruption in the Bulgarian Ministry of Culture.

In parliament, Yoncheva is a member of the Committee on Civil Liberties, Justice and Home Affairs and the Subcommittee on Security and Defence. She is also member of the Democracy, Rule of Law & Fundamental Rights Monitoring Group.

In addition to her committee assignments, Yoncheva is part of the parliament's delegations for relations with Israel and to the Parliamentary Assembly of the Union for the Mediterranean.

Yoncheva was the chair of an inter-institutional negotiation group meant to agree to the details of the EU Migration Pact and pass it through the European Parliament.

She was nominated as a candidate for MEP from the DPS political party in the 2024 European Parliament election.
