= Andrey Novakov =

Bulgarian politician (born 1988)

MEP Andrey Novakov
- Андрей Новаков
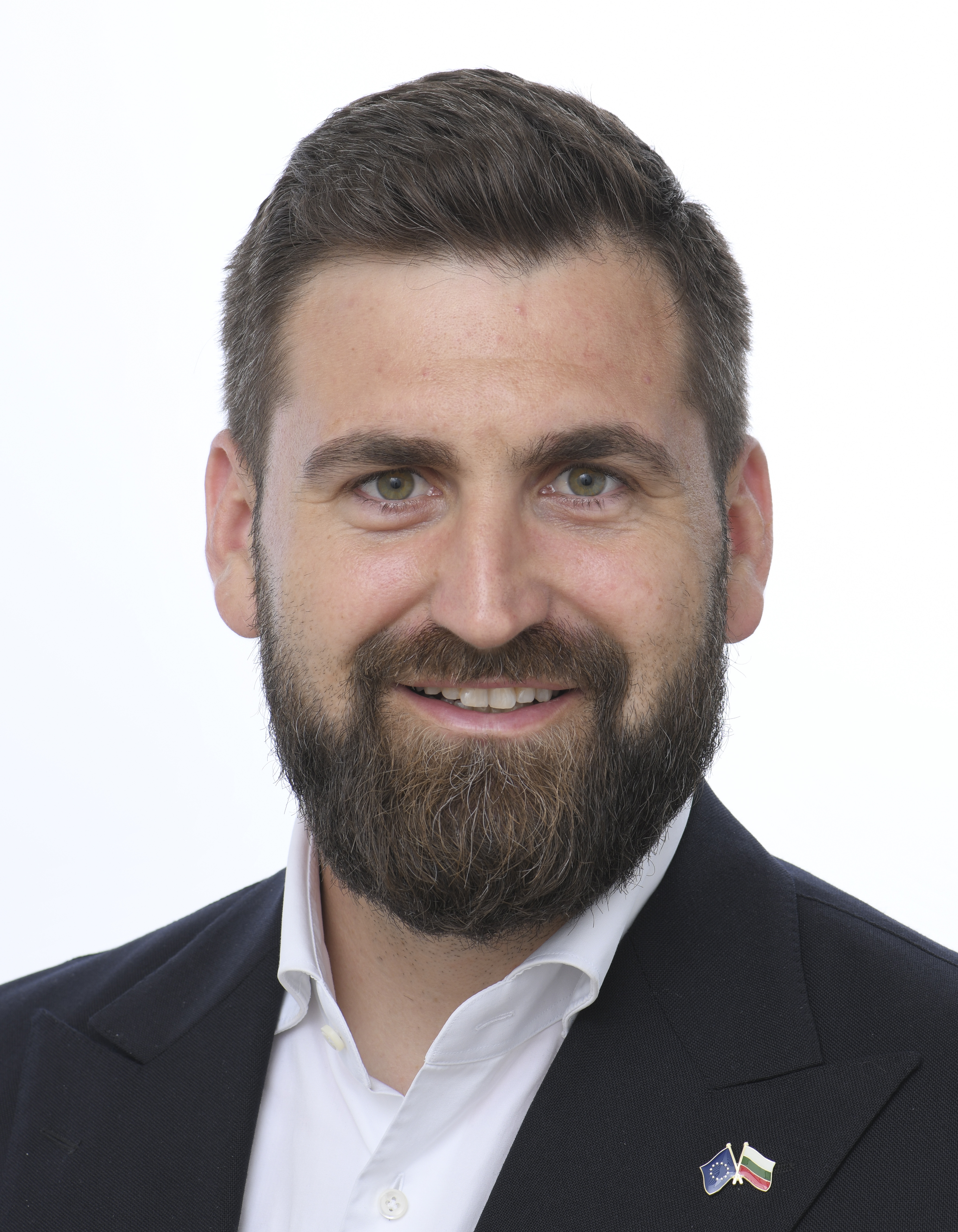
- Novakov in 2024

Member of the European Parliament for Bulgaria
- Incumbent
- Assumed office 24 November 2014
- Preceded by: Tomislav Donchev

Personal details
- Born: Andrey Grishev Novakov; 7 July 1988 (age 38) Pazardzhik, Bulgaria
- Party: Bulgaria: GERB (European Union) EU: EPP
- Spouse: Tatyana Novakova (m. 2017; div. 2023)
- Children: 1
- Education: South-West University
- Profession: Politician
- Website: www.andreynovakov.eu

Andrey Grishev Novakov (Bulgarian: Андрей Гришев Новаков; born 7 July 1988) is a Bulgarian politician who is currently serving as a Member of the European Parliament. A member of the GERB party, which is affiliated with the European People's Party on a European level, he was previously a leader of a youth wing of his party.

His work is concentrated in four priorities: EU funding instruments and simplification of EU funding, European Fund for Strategic Investments, youth employment (Youth Guarantee), EU Budget and Budgetary control. Novakov is the initiator and creator of the programme for youth entrepreneurship ALECO. He replaces Tomislav Donchev, who became vice-prime minister in the second government of GERB in Bulgaria. Novakov is a member of the Committee on Regional Development, substitute member of the Committee on Budgets and Committee on budgetary control. He is a laureate of the Forbes magazine, being ranked 30 under 30 for most successful young people in Politics section.

On 4 June 2015, Novakov was elected co-chairman of the Commission on Sustainable Development in the scope of EUROLAT. On 6 October, the European Parliament approves his report, as a result of which Bulgaria receives financial assistance amounting to €6,377,000 to cope with the consequences of floods and the severe winter in the same year.

Novakov is also an author of the report for the allocation of €380,000 for technical assistance to the largest EU fund in support of people who have lost their job – the European Globalisation Adjustment Fund.

== Early life ==
Born in Pazardzhik, Novakov acquired a master's degree in law and specialized in the field of legal sciences in 2014. Later that November, he also specialised in the United States of America within a program for young leaders from around the world, which included a placement in the US State Department and the Pentagon.

From 2008 to 2011, Novakov was President of the Student Parliament in the Faculty of Law and History of South-West University "Neofit Rilski" where he was re-elected for a second term. Afterwards, Novakov was elected a deputy chairman of the largest student organization in Europe, European Democrat Students. The following year, in 2012, he was the only deputy chairman to be re-elected to his post. As a President of the Student Parliament, Novakov became a member of the GERB political party in Blagoevgrad.

== Political career ==
Novakov is also a member of the European Internet Forum.
