= Radan Kanev =

Bulgarian politician

- Радан Кънев
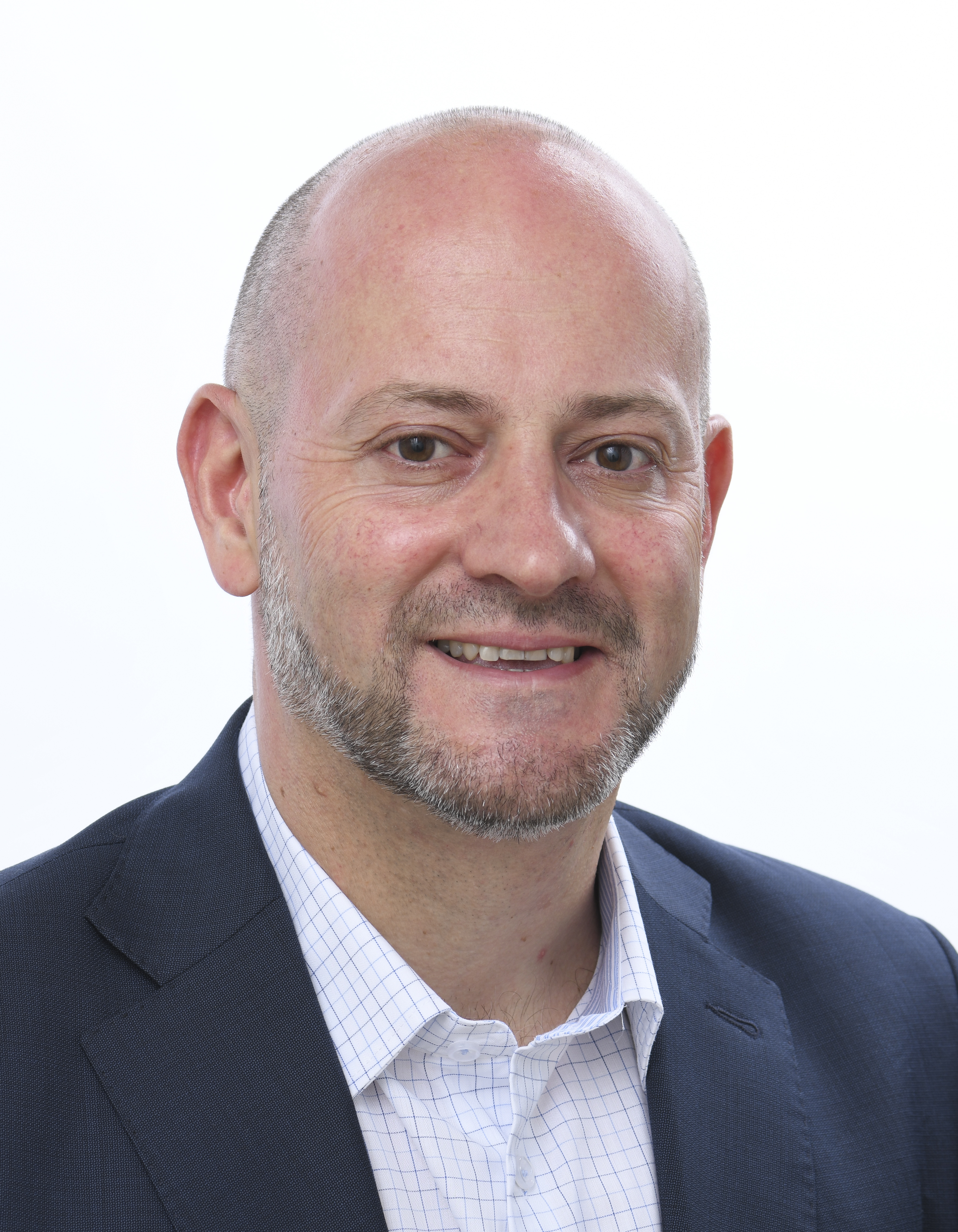
- Official portrait, 2024

Member of the European Parliament for Bulgaria
- Incumbent
- Assumed office 2 July 2019
- Preceded by: Svetoslav Malinov

Member of the National Assembly
- In office 27 October 2014 – 26 January 2017
- Constituency: 3rd MMC - Varna

Leader of the Democrats for Strong Bulgaria
- In office 23 June 2013 – 27 March 2017
- Preceded by: Ivan Kostov
- Succeeded by: Atanas Atanasov

Personal details
- Born: Radan Milenov Kanev; 30 September 1975 (age 51) Sofia, PR Bulgaria
- Party: DSB (since 2004)
- Other political affiliations: European People’s Party
- Children: 1
- Education: Sofia University
- Occupation: Politician; lawyer

Radan Milenov Kanev (Bulgarian: Радан Миленов Кънев, born 30 September 1975) is a Bulgarian politician who is currently a Member of the European Parliament. A member of the DSB party, which he led from 2013 to 2017, he previously served as Member of the National Assembly from 2014 to 2017.

== Biography ==
Kanev was born in Sofia, but his family's roots are from Varna. He graduated from the Lycée Français de Sofia, subsequently completing his legal studies at Sofia University.

In the 1990s, Kanev was chairman of the youth organization of the Bulgarian Red Cross. Kanev is known as a prominent political blogger and his active involvement in politics began in 2004.

He joined DSB in 2007 and became the party's leader on 23 June 2013. Kanev has been labeled as Ivan Kostov's ideological successor. After DSB could not make the 4% bar for entry into Parliament during the 2017 elections, Kanev resigned as a leader of the party.

Radan Kanev supported Boyko Borisov's second government: DSB was an official coalition partner. Subsequently, Kanev built a reputation as a strong critic of Bulgaria's Prime Minister Boyko Borisov. He has underlined that in Bulgaria there are major problems with the justice system and the respect for private property. He blames the issues on the Borisov-Peevski model of governance, which has "dominated Bulgarian politics in the past ten years."

In 2019, Kanev was elected as Member of the European Parliament from the Democratic Bulgaria coalition. He joined the European People's Party. Kanev argues that "governing the European Union without the European People's Party is impossible" and advocates that the European Greens should be part of the governing majority in the current European Parliament.

In 2022, after the fall of Kiril Petkov's government, Kanev called for unity regarding Bulgaria's foreign policy despite political differences.

At the 2024 European Parliament election, Kanev was re-elected to the European Parliament. Despite being placed fifth on the PP-DB coalition list, which only won three seats, Kanev was able to receive more preference votes than candidates placed above him. Subsequently, he was to serve 5 more years as an MEP.

== Personal life ==
Kanev is married and has one child.
