= Bulgaria (European Parliament constituency) =

Constituency of the European Parliament

- European Parliament constituency
- Location among the current constituencies
- Member state: Bulgaria
- Created: 2007
- MEPs: 18 (2007–2009); 17 (2009–2011); 18 (2011–2014); 17 (2014–present)

Bulgaria is a European Parliament constituency for elections in the European Union covering the member state of Bulgaria. It is currently represented by seventeen Members of the European Parliament.

== Elections ==
=== 2007 ===
The 2007 European election was Bulgaria's first election since joining the European Union on 1 January 2007 and was held on 20 May 2007.

The top two parties scored 5 seats each; Citizens for European Development of Bulgaria and Bulgarian Socialist Party, followed by the Movement for Rights and Freedoms with four, Ataka with three, and National Movement Simeon II (NDSV) with one. It was considered likely that the result of the election would cause a major political crisis in Bulgaria, due to the expected weak results of the National Movement.

=== 2009 ===
The 2009 European election was the seventh election to the European Parliament and the second for Bulgaria.

=== 2014 ===
The 2014 European election was the eighth election to the European Parliament and the third for Bulgaria.

=== 2019 ===
The 2019 European election was the ninth election to the European Parliament and the fourth for Bulgaria.

=== 2024 ===
The 2024 European election was the tenth election to the European Parliament and the fifth for Bulgaria.
