= 2026 Bulgarian presidential election =

- 25 October 2026 (first round); 1 November 2026 (second round)
- Turnout: 22.98% (first round) ▼17.49pp 28.67% (second round) ▼6.18pp
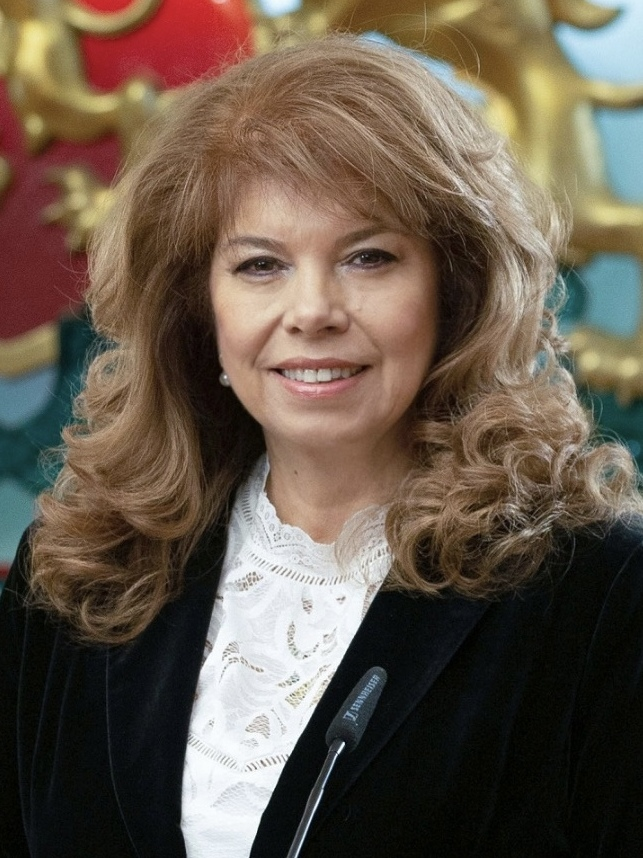

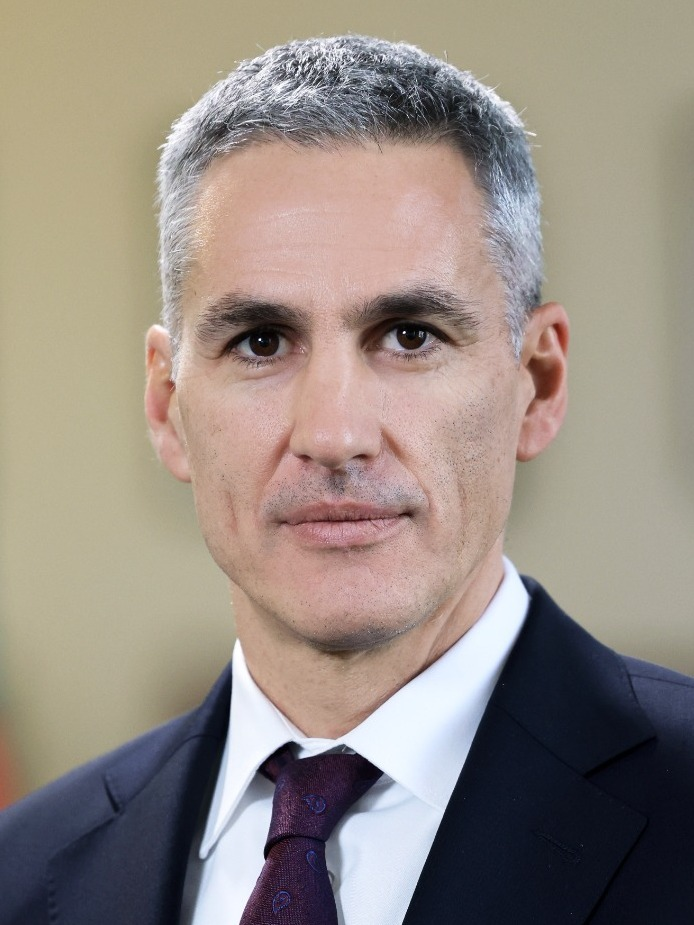
Nominee	Iliana Iotova	Andrey Gurov
Party	Independent (Note: Yotova is a member of the BSP, but her membership is "frozen" while she holds higher office. She is running as an independent and her candidacy is supported by BSP–OL, PB, ISBG, and IMRO-BND.)	Independent (Note: Supported by PP–DB)
Running mate	Kiril Valchev	Georgi Kandev
Popular vote	1,093,852	750,251
Percentage	57.57%	39.48%
President before election
Iliana Iotova
BSP
Elected President
Iliana Iotova
BSP

Presidential elections were held in Bulgaria on 25 October 2026, with a second round held on 1 November 2026 after no candidate received a majority of the vote in the first round. Incumbent president Iliana Iotova was eligible to run for a full 5 year term. In the end, she won the election with 57.6% of the votes against Andrey Gurov's 39.5%. She became the first woman elected president of Bulgaria.

In the first round, Iotova won 35% of the vote, with former Prime Minister Andrey Gurov winning 32%. As no candidate won a majority of the votes, a runoff election was held on 1 November between them. The first round saw the lowest voter turnout in Bulgarian history, which observers attributed to distrust in the government and widespread political apathy. Gyurov conceded to Iotova after polls for the second round closed.

== Electoral system ==
The president of Bulgaria is elected through a two-round system; if no candidate receives a majority of the vote in the first round or a candidate receives a majority of the vote but voter turnout is below 50%, a second round run-off is held between the top two candidates. No candidate has ever won in the first round. Since 2016, a none of the above option is also present on the ballot. In order to stand as a candidate, a person must be a Bulgarian citizen holding no other nationality, be at least 40 years of age by election day and have resided in the country for the previous five years.

== Background ==
Former presidents Georgi Parvanov and Rumen Radev (now Prime Minister) are ineligible to be elected to a third term, as the Bulgarian Constitution prohibits any person from being elected as president more than twice.

The election took place after drone attacks on Bulgarian ships in the Black Sea, whose source is not yet established but is suspected to originate from Russia. Political analysts consider incumbent president Iliana Iotova a more pro-Russian or pro-neutrality candidate, while challenger Andrey Gurov is considered more pro-Ukrainian.

The Party of European Socialists publicly supported Iliana Iotova's candidacy, which drew criticism from the European Democrats over her lack of support for military assistance towards Ukraine.

== Candidates ==
=== Registered candidates ===
Ten parties and 27 initiative committees submitted documents to participate in the elections for President and Vice President of the Republic on October 25, 2026. One party was denied registration, while another withdrew its registration. Three initiative committees were also denied registration. Consequently, a total of 32 participants remained registered: 8 parties and 25 initiative committees. Of these, one party and three initiative committees did not nominate candidate pairs and one initiative committee was canceled by CEC; ultimately, 27 candidate pairs remained registered and participated in the draw to determine their ballot numbers on the unified ballot. A complete list of independent candidates and parties registered to contest in the election is presented below:

Ballot number	Candidate	Experience	Running mate	Party
1	Georgi Dimov		Dimitar Shivikov	Independent
2	Rosen Milenov		Ivan Ivanov	Independent
3	Ivanka Tsvetanova-Petkova		Panayot Kyuchukov	Independent
4	Andrey Gurov	Caretaker Prime Minister (2026)	Georgi Kandev	Independent
5	Yordan Maldzhanski		Valentin Hristov	Independent
6	Kamen Taskov		Galya Ivanova	Independent
7	Nako Stefanov		Nina Lambova	Independent
8	Metodi Bachvarov		Lenin Stanoev	Independent
9	Ivaylo Simeonov	Mayor of Elin Pelin Municipality (2015–present)	Kosyo Stoychev	Independent
10	Maria Koleva		Valeri Velkovski	Pravoto
11	Kostadin Kostadinov	MP (2021–present)	Petar Volgin	Revival
12	Aleksandar Tomov	Deputy Prime Minister (1990–1991)	Aleksandar Garibov	BSDE
13	Boris Anzov		Branimir Michev	Independent
14	Rumyana Chenalova		Georgi Georgiev	Independent
15	Lachezar Avramov		Ivaylo Atanasov	Independent
16	Ivo Lulchev		Stefan Popov	Independent
17	Radostin Vasilev	Minister of Youth and Sport (2021–2022)	Krasimir Manov	MECh
18	Ivan Hristanov	Minister of Agriculture and Foods (2026)	Stoyanka Cherkezova	Independent (Note: Supported by Edinenie)
19	Ivelin Mihaylov	MP (2025)	Yuliana Mateeva	Velichie
20	Velichka Georgieva		Rosen Ivanov	Independent
21	Volen Siderov	MP (2005–2019)	Slavcho Velkov	Independent (Note: Supported by Attack)
22	Nikolay Nenchev	Minister of Defence (2014–2017)	Tsveta Kirilova	BZNS
23	Iskra Nedeva		Stoyan Georgiev	Independent
24	Plamen Paskov		Svetozar Saev	Independent
25	Iliana Iotova	President of Bulgaria (2026–present)	Kiril Valchev	Independent
26	Boyan Rasate		Yordan Manasiev	Independent (Note: Supported by BNS-ND)
27	Ventsislav Angelov		Atanas Stefanov	Truth and Only Truth

=== Declined to be candidates ===
The following notable individuals publicly denied interest in running:

==== GERB–SDS ====
- Boyko Borisov, Prime Minister (2009–2013, 2014–2017, 2017–2021)

==== Former presidents ====
- Rosen Plevneliev, President (2012–2017)
- Petar Stoyanov, President (1997–2002)

==== Others ====
- Daniel Valchev, Deputy Prime Minister and Minister of Education and Science (2005–2009)
- Yolo Denev, Despite his declaration to participate never submitted documents at the Central Electoral Commission.

=== Rejected or withdrawn registrations from Central Electoral Commission ===
- Bulgarian Socialist Party – discontinued registration proceedings
- Glas Naroden (Voice of the People) – rejected registration
- Initiative Committee for Velin Meledzhiev and Iliana Meledzhieva – rejected registration
- Initiative Committee for Dimitar Nikolov and Angel Vasilev – rejected registration
- Initiative Committee for Rumyana Petrova and Maya Petkova – rejected registration
- Initiative Committee for Yavor Genov and Maksim Velkov – canceled registration

=== Registered participants who have not nominated a candidate pair ===
The following participants register with the CEC to take part in the presidential and vice-presidential elections but do not nominate a candidate pair by the deadline of September 22, 2026.

- Movement for Rights and Freedoms
- Initiative Committee for Miroslav Paskalev and Katya Nikolova
- Initiative Committee for Yordanka Koleva and Veselin Radkov
- Initiative Committee for Galen Todorov and Maria Paskova

== Endorsements ==
After the first round of the election, multiple parties expressed positions about the second round.

Endorsements from political parties
Parties	Endorsement	Ref.
Revival	Against Gurov/Kandev	
MECh	Against Iotova/Valchev	
Velichie	Iotova/Valchev	
BZNS	Gurov/Kandev	
GERB–SDS	Gurov/Kandev	

== Opinion polls ==
The opinion poll results were recalculated from the original data by excluding undecided and non-voters.

=== First round ===
Polling firm	Fieldwork date	Sample										
Polling firm	Fieldwork date	Sample								Others	NOTA	Lead
Polling firm	Fieldwork date	Sample	Iotova Ind.		Gurov Ind.	Kostadinov Revival	Hristanov Ind.	Vasilev MECh	Mihaylov Velichie	Others	NOTA	Lead
2026 presidential election	25 Oct 2026	—	34.8		32.0	12.5	2.4	4.6	3.8	5.5 (Note: Georgi Dimov – 1%, Ivaylo Simeonov – 0.9%, Rosen Milenov – 0.6%, Nikolay Nenchev – 0.4%, others – 2.6%)	4.4	2.8
Alpha Research	25 Oct 2026 (exit poll)	n/a	35.3		32.4	12.6	2.2	4.1	3.5	5.0	4.9	2.9
Gallup	25 Oct 2026 (exit poll)	n/a	36.6		31.8	15.7	2.6	3.1	2.7	3.4	1.6	4.8
Market Links	25 Oct 2026 (exit poll)	n/a	32.6		31.5	13.5	2.4	4.3	3.5	6.8	5.4	1.1
Myara	25 Oct 2026 (exit poll)	n/a	35.6		32.5	13.5	1.6	3.9	3.2	5.0	4.7	3.1
Trend	25 Oct 2026 (exit poll)	n/a	36.4		32.1	14.1	1.7	3.5	3.0	5.3	3.8	4.3
Gallup	14 – 22 Oct 2026	1,001	44.2		30.4	12.7	3.5	2.6	1.3	4.9 (Note: Ivaylo Simeonov - 1.9%, Nikolay Nenchev - 1.6%, Others - 1.4%)	0.4	13.8
Alpha Research	18 – 22 Oct 2026	1,000	41.1		28.3	12.8	3.6	3.9	3.4	4.3	2.6	12.8
Trend	14 – 20 Oct 2026	1,002	45.9		27.8	10.9	2.4	3.2	2.2	4.5	3.1	18.1
Myara	8 – 19 Oct 2026	1,009	43.4		28.9	10.2	1.9	2.9	3.1	7.1	2.5	14.5
Market Links	13 – 19 Oct 2026	1,006	47.3		30.6	10.3	2.3	2.8	4.3	2.5	—	16.7
Sova Harris	13 – 17 Oct 2026	1,000	49.2		24.8	9.5	1.9	3.1	2.6	8.9	—	24.4
Gallup	26 Sept – 6 Oct 2026	987	47.8		26.4	11.6	4.4	2.8	1.7	4.9 (Note: Nikolay Nenchev - 2.2%, Ivaylo Simeonov - 1.8%, Others - 0.9%)	0.4	21.4
Myara	26 Sept – 4 Oct 2026	1,000	46.9		25.3	8.8	2.7	2.2	4.2	7.6	2.3	21.6
Trend	26 Sept – 2 Oct 2026	1,003	47.8		24.6	9.7	1.9	4.6	2.4	4.4	4.6	23.2
Alpha Research	24 Sept – 1 Oct 2026	1,000	44.5		26.1	10.5	3.4	2.5	2.2	7.9 (Note: Nikolay Nenchev – 1.8%, Ivaylo Simeonov – 1.6%, Georgi Dimov – 0.9%, Others – 3.6%)	2.9	18.4
Market Links	26 – 29 Sept 2026	1,006	51.6		27.5	8.0	1.1	2.0	4.9	4.6	—	24.1
Sova Harris	23 – 28 Sept 2026	1,000	50.2		23.7	12.7	—	—	—	13.4	—	26.5
Global Metrics (Note: Generic candidates)	23 Jun – 11 Jul 2026	1,503	39.7	4.8	13.3	5.5	4.4	2.2	—	30.0 (Note: GERB – 11.5%, DPS – 3.6%, Others – 14.9%)	—	26.4
2021 general election	14 Nov 2021	—N/a	49.4		3.7	3.9	—	—	—	40.8	2.3	26.6

=== Second round ===
Polling firm	Fieldwork date	Sample			
Polling firm	Fieldwork date	Sample			Lead
Polling firm	Fieldwork date	Sample	Iotova Ind.	Gurov Ind.	Lead
Second round	1 Nov 2026	—	57.6	39.5	18.1
Alpha Research	1 Nov 2026 (exit poll)	n/a	52.5	43.4	9.1
Market Links	1 Nov 2026 (exit poll)	n/a	50.7	44.0	6.7
Myara	1 Nov 2026 (exit poll)	n/a	51.1	44.6	6.5
Trend	1 Nov 2026 (exit poll)	n/a	51.6	43.4	8.2
First round	25 Oct 2026	—	34.8	32.0	2.8
Sova Harris	13 – 17 Oct 2026	1,000	65.8	34.2	31.6
2021 general election	21 Nov 2021	—	66.7	—	34.9

== Results ==
Candidate	Running mate	Party	First round		Second round	
Candidate	Running mate	Party	Votes	%	Votes	%
Iliana Iotova	Kiril Valchev	Independent (BSP – United Left, Progressive Bulgaria, Stand Up.BG, IMRO – Bulgarian National Movement)	528,951	34.76	1,093,852	57.57
Andrey Gurov	Georgi Kandev	Independent (PP–DB)	486,232	31.95	750,251	39.48
Kostadin Kostadinov	Petar Volgin	Revival	190,910	12.55		
Radostin Vasilev	Krasimir Manov	Morality, Unity, Honour	70,127	4.61		
Ivelin Mihaylov	Yuliana Mateeva	Velichie	57,643	3.79		
Ivan Hristanov	Stoyanka Cherkezova	Independent (Edinenie)	36,407	2.39		
Georgi Dimov	Dimitar Shivikov	Independent	14,840	0.98		
Ivaylo Simeonov	Kosyo Stoychev	Independent (New Bulgaria)	14,209	0.93		
Rosen Milenov	Ivan Ivanov	Independent	8,368	0.55		
Nikolay Nenchev	Tsveta Kirilova	Bulgarian Agrarian National Union	5,783	0.38		
Ivanka Tsvetanova-Petkova	Panayot Kyuchukov	Independent	4,527	0.30		
Volen Siderov	Slavcho Velkov	Independent (Attack)	4,047	0.27		
Maria Koleva	Valeri Velkovski	Pravoto	3,818	0.25		
Rumyana Chenalova	Georgi Georgiev	Independent	3,687	0.24		
Ventsislav Angelov	Atanas Stefanov	Truth and Only Truth	2,856	0.19		
Plamen Paskov	Svetozar Saev	Independent (KOY)	2,810	0.18		
Aleksandar Tomov	Aleksandar Garibov	Bulgarian Social Democracy – EuroLeft	2,505	0.16		
Yordan Maldzhanski	Valentin Hristov	Independent	2,505	0.16		
Nako Stefanov	Nina Lambova	Independent	2,460	0.16		
Boyan Rasate	Yordan Manasiev	Independent (BNS–ND)	2,321	0.15		
Kamen Taskov	Galya Ivanova	Independent	1,752	0.12		
Metodi Bachvarov	Lenin Stanoev	Independent	1,563	0.10		
Velichka Georgieva	Rosen Ivanov	Independent	1,397	0.09		
Iskra Nedeva	Stoyan Georgiev	Independent	1,213	0.08		
Lachezar Avramov	Ivaylo Atanasov	Independent	1,165	0.08		
Boris Anzov	Branimir Michev	Independent	1,141	0.07		
Ivo Lulchev	Stefan Popov	Independent	1,120	0.07		
None of the above			67,353	4.43	56,080	2.95
Total			1,521,710	100.00	1,900,183	100.00
Valid votes			1,521,710	99.79	1,900,183	99.86
Invalid/blank votes			3,278	0.21	2,750	0.14
Total votes			1,524,988	100.00	1,902,933	100.00
Registered voters/turnout			6,637,238	22.98	6,637,274	28.67
Source: Electoral Commission of Bulgaria (First round), Electoral Commission of Bulgaria (Second round)

== See also ==
- Elections in Bulgaria
- 2026 Bulgarian parliamentary election
