= Elections in Bulgaria =

Bulgaria elects a head of state—the president—and a legislature on a national level. The president is elected for a five-year term by the people directly. The National Assembly (Narodno Sabranie) has 240 members elected for a four-year term by proportional representation in multi-seat constituencies with a 4% threshold. Bulgaria has a multi-party system in which usually no party receives a required majority and parties have to collaborate to form governments, generally via confidence and supply or coalition agreements.

== Parliamentary elections ==
Parliamentary elections have been held in Bulgaria since 1879. There was a period when partisan politics was banned from 1934 to 1944; in the wake of the Bulgarian coup d'état of 1934 and the sequential personal rule of Tsar Boris III. There was also period of single party system between 1945 and 1989, during the People's Republic of Bulgaria, during which only candidates sanctioned by authorities could run. This, in practice, gave the Bulgarian Communist Party and its collaborators a monopoly on power.

Until 1945 there was no universal suffrage for the women. The table below show the elections since 1990, when the government became a democratic republic.

All elections since 1991 have had 240 members, elected for a four-year term by proportional representation in multi-seat constituencies with a 4% threshold. The two elections that differed from this model was the 1990 Grand National Assembly election, where 400 representatives were elected: half by proportional representation and half by first-past-the-post voting. The other exception was the 2009 election when 209 representatives were elected by proportional representation and 31 through first past the post; seats corresponding to the provinces and the largest cities.

=== Historical turnout ===
Turnout
1986	1990	1991	1994	1997	2001	2005	2009	2013	2014	2017	April 2021	July 2021	Nov 2021	2022	2023	June 2024	October 2024	2026
99.92%	90.78%	83.87%	75.23%	58.87%	66.63%	55.76%	60.64%	52.47%	49.51%	52.57%	49.1%	40.39%	38.64%	39.30%	40.63%	33.4%	38.94%	50.70%

=== Most recent election ===
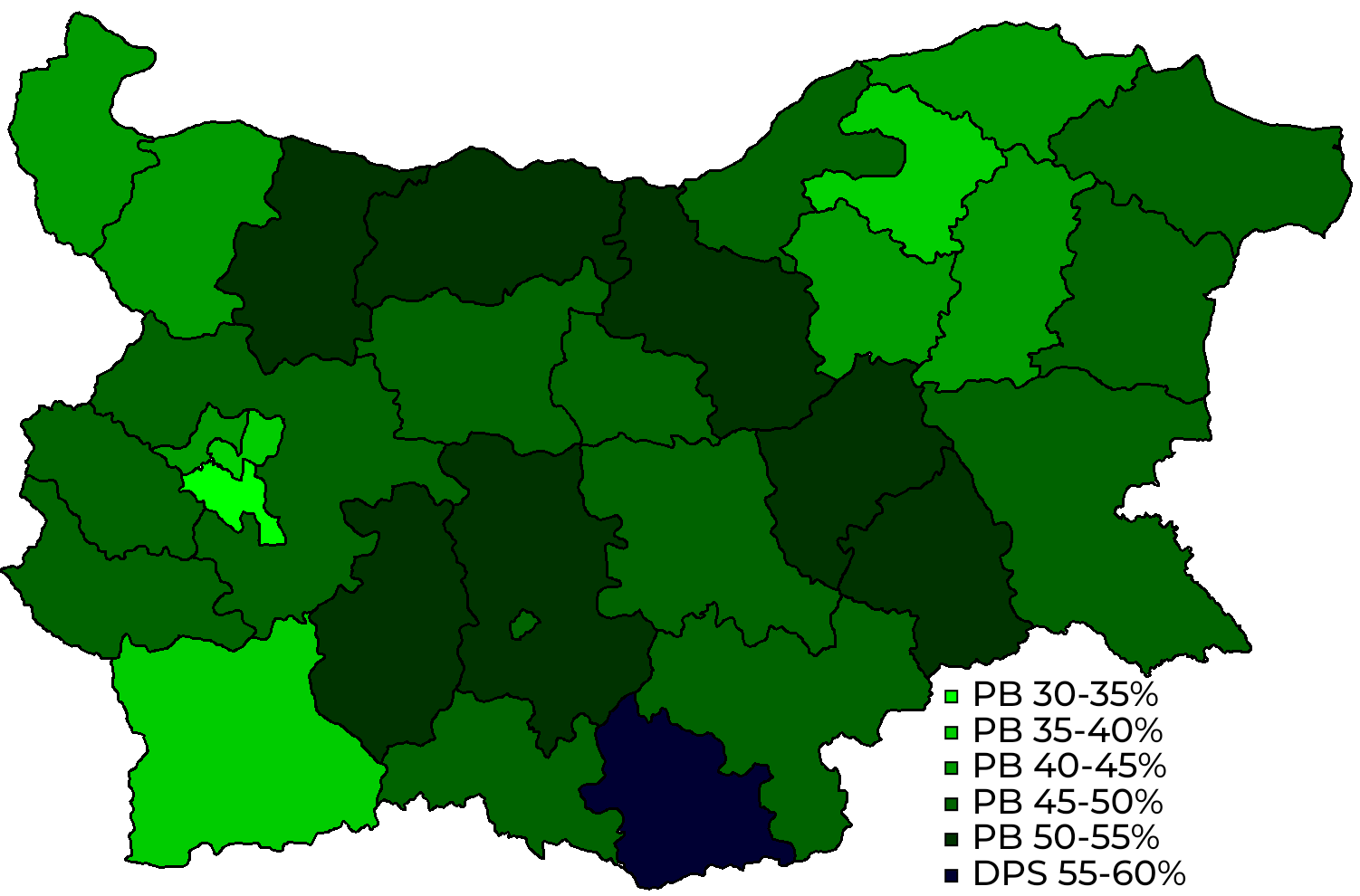
Results of the election showed that PB was the most voted party in all provinces of Bulgaria except Kardzhali .

PB was the largest party with 44.6% of the vote, followed by GERB/SDS with 13.3%, PP–DP with 12.6%, DPS with 7.1%, and Revival with 4.3%. Among other main parties, MECh, Velichie, and BSP–OL respectively obtained 3.2%, 3.1%, and 3.0%, narrowly below the 4% threshold. In terms of seats, PB obtained an absolute majority with 131 seats, followed by GERB/SDS with 39, PP–DP with 37, DPS with 21, and Revival with 12. Although PB obtained a larger than expected win, the final polls were relatively accurate and within (or close to) the margin of error as Market Links, Alpha Research, Myara, Sova Harris, Trend, CAM, and Gallup respectively deviated by an average of 2.79%, 3.14%, 3.24%, 3.64%, 3.71%, 4.01%, and 4.83% from the election results.

Party	Votes	%	Seats	+/–
Progressive Bulgaria	1,444,920	43.91	131	New
GERB–SDS	433,755	13.18	39	−27
We Continue the Change – Democratic Bulgaria	408,846	12.42	37	+1
Movement for Rights and Freedoms	230,693	7.01	21	−8
Revival	137,940	4.19	12	−21
Morality, Unity, Honour	104,506	3.18	0	–11
Velichie	100,572	3.06	0	–10
BSP – United Left	97,753	2.97	0	–19
Siyanie	93,559	2.84	0	New
Alliance for Rights and Freedoms	50,759	1.54	0	–19
There is Such a People	23,861	0.73	0	–17
Anti-Corruption Bloc	18,999	0.58	0	0
Blue Bulgaria	18,640	0.57	0	0
Bulgaria Can	17,263	0.52	0	0
Direct Democracy	10,032	0.30	0	New
Nation	9,804	0.30	0	New
Movement of Non-Partisan Candidates	9,761	0.30	0	New
Nepokorna Bulgaria	6,221	0.19	0	New
People's Voice	4,665	0.14	0	New
People's Party "Truth and Only the Truth"	4,392	0.13	0	0
My Bulgaria	4,358	0.13	0	0
Party of the Greens	3,027	0.09	0	0
Resistance	1,897	0.06	0	New
Third of March	1,840	0.06	0	New
Independents	2,093	0.06	0	New
None of the above	50,733	1.54	–	–
Total	3,290,889	100.00	240	0
Valid votes	3,290,889	97.94		
Invalid/blank votes	69,222	2.06		
Total votes	3,360,111	100.00		
Registered voters/turnout	6,627,747	50.70		
Source: Central Electoral Commission

Vote share
PB	43.91%
GERB–SDS	13.18%
PP–DB	12.42%
DPS	7.01%
Revival	4.19%
MECh	3.18%
Velichie	3.06%
BSP–OL	2.97%
Siyanie	2.84%
APS	1.54%
Others	5.70%

Seat share
PB	54.58%
GERB–SDS	16.25%
PP–DB	15.42%
DPS	8.75%
Revival	5.00%

== Presidential elections ==
Presidential elections have been held since 1992. From 1996 onwards, presidential elections have been held every five years.

=== Most recent election ===
Candidate	Running mate	Party	First round		Second round	
Candidate	Running mate	Party	Votes	%	Votes	%
Iliana Iotova	Kiril Valchev	Independent (BSP – United Left, Progressive Bulgaria, Stand Up.BG, IMRO – Bulgarian National Movement)	528,951	34.76	1,093,852	57.57
Andrey Gurov	Georgi Kandev	Independent (PP–DB)	486,232	31.95	750,251	39.48
Kostadin Kostadinov	Petar Volgin	Revival	190,910	12.55		
Radostin Vasilev	Krasimir Manov	Morality, Unity, Honour	70,127	4.61		
Ivelin Mihaylov	Yuliana Mateeva	Velichie	57,643	3.79		
Ivan Hristanov	Stoyanka Cherkezova	Independent (Edinenie)	36,407	2.39		
Georgi Dimov	Dimitar Shivikov	Independent	14,840	0.98		
Ivaylo Simeonov	Kosyo Stoychev	Independent (New Bulgaria)	14,209	0.93		
Rosen Milenov	Ivan Ivanov	Independent	8,368	0.55		
Nikolay Nenchev	Tsveta Kirilova	Bulgarian Agrarian National Union	5,783	0.38		
Ivanka Tsvetanova-Petkova	Panayot Kyuchukov	Independent	4,527	0.30		
Volen Siderov	Slavcho Velkov	Independent (Attack)	4,047	0.27		
Maria Koleva	Valeri Velkovski	Pravoto	3,818	0.25		
Rumyana Chenalova	Georgi Georgiev	Independent	3,687	0.24		
Ventsislav Angelov	Atanas Stefanov	Truth and Only Truth	2,856	0.19		
Plamen Paskov	Svetozar Saev	Independent (KOY)	2,810	0.18		
Aleksandar Tomov	Aleksandar Garibov	Bulgarian Social Democracy – EuroLeft	2,505	0.16		
Yordan Maldzhanski	Valentin Hristov	Independent	2,505	0.16		
Nako Stefanov	Nina Lambova	Independent	2,460	0.16		
Boyan Rasate	Yordan Manasiev	Independent (BNS–ND)	2,321	0.15		
Kamen Taskov	Galya Ivanova	Independent	1,752	0.12		
Metodi Bachvarov	Lenin Stanoev	Independent	1,563	0.10		
Velichka Georgieva	Rosen Ivanov	Independent	1,397	0.09		
Iskra Nedeva	Stoyan Georgiev	Independent	1,213	0.08		
Lachezar Avramov	Ivaylo Atanasov	Independent	1,165	0.08		
Boris Anzov	Branimir Michev	Independent	1,141	0.07		
Ivo Lulchev	Stefan Popov	Independent	1,120	0.07		
None of the above			67,353	4.43	56,080	2.95
Total			1,521,710	100.00	1,900,183	100.00
Valid votes			1,521,710	99.79	1,900,183	99.86
Invalid/blank votes			3,278	0.21	2,750	0.14
Total votes			1,524,988	100.00	1,902,933	100.00
Registered voters/turnout			6,637,238	22.98	6,637,274	28.67
Source: Electoral Commission of Bulgaria (First round), Electoral Commission of Bulgaria (Second round)

== European Parliament elections ==
Bulgaria has participated in every European Parliament elections since 2007, as its accession to the European Union in that same year. GERB has won every EU election since 2007, as of 2024.

=== European Parliament elections in Bulgaria ===
- 2007 European Parliament election in Bulgaria
- 2009 European Parliament election in Bulgaria
- 2014 European Parliament election in Bulgaria
- 2019 European Parliament election in Bulgaria
- 2024 European Parliament election in Bulgaria

== Referendums ==
Since 1991, referendums are required to have a turnout of at least 60% in order to be considered valid. Any referendum which has a turnout of at least 20% is required to be debated in the National Assembly. Under current Bulgarian law a referendum is mandatory if a petition receives at least five hundred thousand signatures.

Question	For		Against		None of the above		Invalid/ blank	Total votes	Registered voters	Turnout	Outcome	Source
Question	Votes	%	Votes	%	Votes	%	Invalid/ blank	Total votes	Registered voters	Turnout	Outcome	Source
19 November 1922
War criminal prosecutions	647,313	74.33	223,584	25.67	—N/a	—N/a	57,879	928,776	—N/a	—N/a	Approved	
8 September 1946
Adopting a Republic	3,833,183	95.63	175,231	4.37	—N/a	—N/a	124,507	4,132,921	4,509,354	91.65	Approved	
16 May 1971
Approval of new constitution	6,135,218	99.7	15,477	0.3	—N/a	—N/a	5,533	6,156,228	6,174,635	99.7	Approved	
27 January 2013
Nuclear power plant	851,757	61.49	533,526	38.51	—N/a	—N/a	19,903	1,405,186	6,952,183	20.21	Quorum not met	
25 October 2015
Electronic voting	1,883,411	72.79	704,182	27.21	—N/a	—N/a	122,339	2,709,932	6,766,619	40.05	Quorum not met	
6 November 2016
Two-round system for parliamentary elections	2,509,864	73.80	560,024	16.47	330,928	9.73	87,668	3,488,484	6,865,086	50.81	Quorum not met	
Compulsory voting	2,158,929	63.48	905,691	26.63	336,180	9.89	87,668	3,488,468	6,865,086	50.81	Quorum not met	
Political funding	2,516,791	74.02	523,759	15.40	359,778	10.58	87,668	3,487,996	6,865,086	50.81	Quorum not met	

=== Regional referendums ===
Several regional referendums have been held as well.

== Local elections ==
Mayors and municipal councilors are elected across the country every four years. The elections to Bulgaria's municipal councils are conducted via proportional representation with an open list preferential voting system.

=== Most recent elections ===
Overall, GERB won 11 regional towns, PP–DB won four, and the Bulgarian Socialist party won three. Of the largest four cities, PP-DB won in the capital (Sofia) and Varna while GERB won in Plovdiv and Burgas.

== See also ==
- Government of Bulgaria
- Constitution of Bulgaria
