= Gurov Government =

Government of Bulgaria (Feb.-May 2026)

- 106th Cabinet of Bulgaria
- 2026
- Gurov Cabinet
- Date formed: 19 February 2026
- Date dissolved: 8 May 2026

People and organisations
- President: Iliana Iotova
- Prime Minister: Andrey Gurov
- Deputy Prime Minister: Andrey Yankulov; Mariya Nedina
- No. of ministers: 21
- Ministers removed: 2
- Total no. of members: 23
- Status in legislature: Caretaker government

History
- Legislature term: 51st National Assembly
- Predecessor: Zhelyazkov
- Successor: Radev

The Gurov Government was the 106th cabinet of Bulgaria. It was appointed by President Iliana Iotova on 19 February 2026, and sworn in the same day. The Gurov caretaker cabinet was the first to be appointed by President Iliana Iotova, after the resignation of Rumen Radev on 23 January. The Caretaker cabinet was dissolved on May 8 After former President Radev took the oath of office as Prime Minister.

== Cabinet ==
The following was the composition of the Andrey Gurov government.

Portfolio	Minister	Took office	Left office	Party
Prime Minister	Andrey Gurov	19 February 2026	8 May 2026	Independent
Deputy Prime Minister for Fair Elections	Stoil Tsitselkov	19 February 2026	20 February 2026	Independent
Deputy Prime Minister for European Funds	Maria Nedina	19 February 2026	8 May 2026	Independent
Deputy Prime Minister and Minister of Justice	Andrey Yankulov	19 February 2026	8 May 2026	Independent
Minister of the Interior	Emil Dechev	19 February 2026	8 May 2026	Independent
Minister of Defence	Atanas Zapryanov (Note: Re-appointed.)	19 February 2026	8 May 2026	Independent
Minister of Finance	Georgi Klissurski	19 February 2026	8 May 2026	Independent
Minister of Foreign Affairs	Nadezhda Neynsky	19 February 2026	8 May 2026	Independent
Minister of Health	Mikhail Okoliyski	19 February 2026	8 May 2026	Independent
Minister of Education and Science	Sergei Ignatov	19 February 2026	8 May 2026	Independent
Minister of Agriculture and Foods	Ivan Hristanov	19 February 2026	8 May 2026	Unification
Minister of Transport and Communications	Korman Ismailov	19 February 2026	8 May 2026	National Party "Freedom and Dignity"
Minister of Environment and Waters	Julian Popov	19 February 2026	8 May 2026	Independent
Minister of Energy	Traycho Traykov (Note: Participated in the founding of the political party, "Acceleration", although it remained unregistered during his tenure as minister.)	19 February 2026	8 May 2026	Independent
Minister of Tourism	Irena Georgieva	19 February 2026	8 May 2026	Independent
Minister of Economy and Industry	Irina Shtonova	19 February 2026	8 May 2026	Independent
Minister of Regional Development and Public Works	Angelina Boneva	19 February 2026	10 March 2026	Independent
Minister of Regional Development and Public Works	Nikolay Naydenov	10 March 2026	8 May 2026	Independent
Minister of Culture	Nayden Todorov	19 February 2026	8 May 2026	Independent
Minister of Youth and Sports	Dimitar Iliev	19 February 2026	8 May 2026	Independent
Minister of Electronic Governance	Georgi Sharkov	19 February 2026	8 May 2026	Independent
Minister of Innovation and Growth	Irena Mladenova	19 February 2026	8 May 2026	Independent
Minister of Labour and Social Policy	Hassan Ademov	19 February 2026	8 May 2026	APS
