= President of Bulgaria =

Head of state

- Президент на България
- Coat of arms of Bulgaria

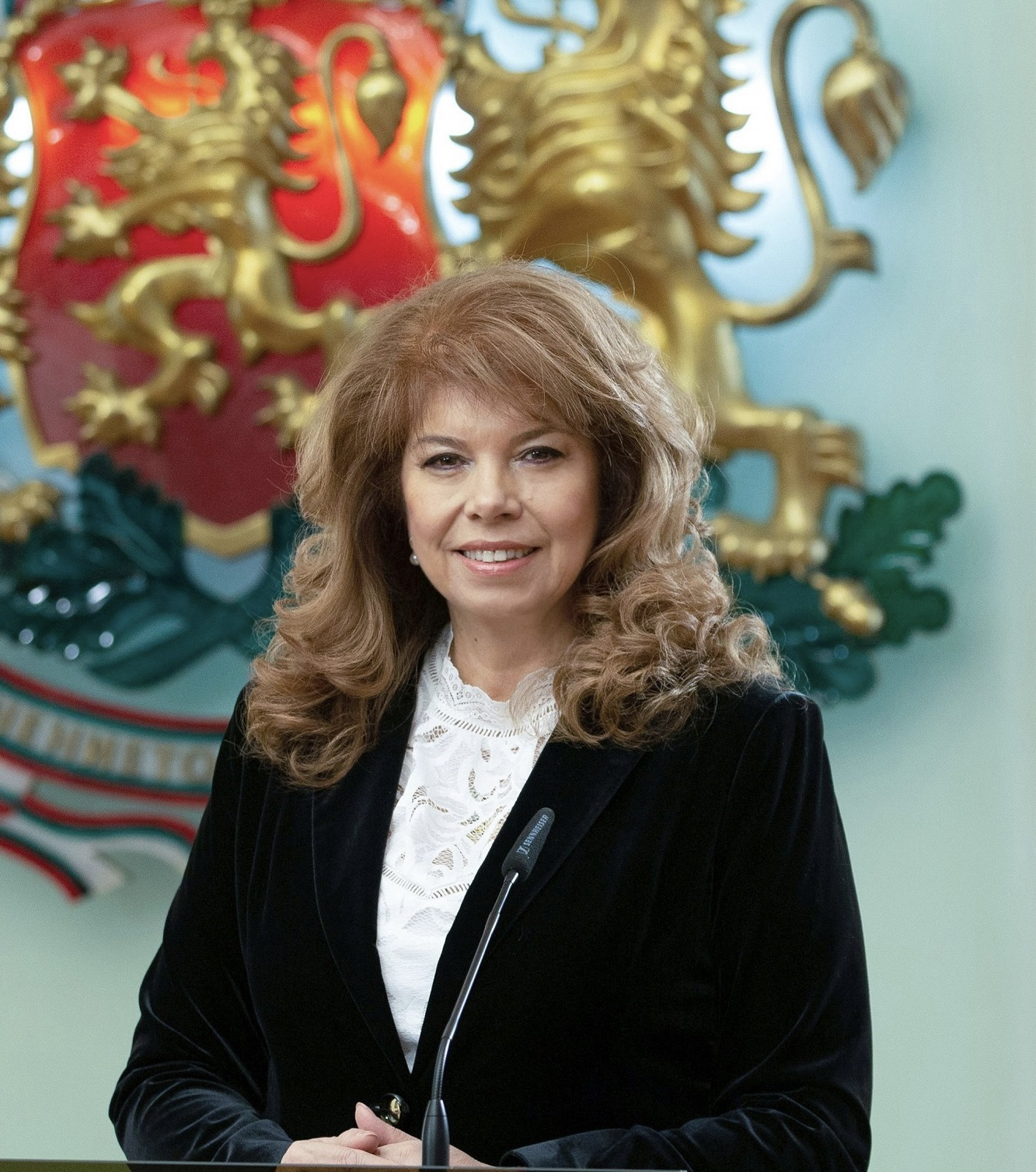
- Incumbent; Iliana Iotova since 23 January 2026
- Style: Her Excellency (diplomatic) Ms. President (informal, more widely used)
- Residence: Sofia (office), Boyana (residential)
- Appointer: Direct elections
- Term length: 5 years; renewable once
- Constituting instrument: Constitution of Bulgaria (1991)
- Precursor: State Council (1971–1990); Chairman (President) (1990–1992)
- Inaugural holder: Zhelyu Zhelev; Modern presidency; Petar Mladenov as inaugural Chairman (President)
- Formation: 3 April 1990; 36 years ago (chairman (president); 22 January 1992; 34 years ago (modern presidency)
- Deputy: Vice President
- Salary: 7 199,38 € per month
- Website: www.president.bg

The president of the Republic of Bulgaria (Bulgarian: Президент на Република България, romanized: Prezident na Republika Balgariya) is the head of state of Bulgaria and the commander-in-chief of the Bulgarian Armed Forces. The official residence of the president is the Boyana Residence in Sofia.

The president's primary function is to serve as the arbitrator of disputes between Bulgaria's different institutions. They are not the head of government or part of the nation's executive power; however, when the National Assembly fails to elect a prime minister, the president appoints an interim government. As of 2026, this happened on 12 occasions: Zhelyu Zhelev in 1994–1995; Petar Stoyanov in 1997; Rosen Plevneliev in 2013 and 2014; Rumen Radev in 2017, 2021, 2022, and 2024; and Iliana Iotova in 2026.

The president is elected for a five-year term and is restricted to two terms, even if they are non-consecutive. After an individual has served two terms as president, that individual would forever be barred from being elected to the presidency again under Bulgaria's Constitution. The president addresses the nation on national television annually on New Year's Eve.

== Election ==
=== Eligibility for election ===
For a Bulgarian citizen to be able to run for the office of President of Bulgaria, they must fulfil the following conditions:

- Must be a Bulgarian citizen by birth
- Must be at least 40 years old
- Must have lived in Bulgaria for the five years prior to the candidacy
- Must fulfil all conditions that would be required for election as a representative to Bulgaria's National Assembly

=== Electoral system ===
The president is elected directly by the Bulgarian people in a two-round election for a five-year term. If a candidate obtains at least 50% of the vote with at least 50% voter turnout, that candidate is elected. If this isn't the case, the top two candidates face off in a runoff election. (Note: Since 2016 a "None of the above" option has been introduced, however these votes are excluded from the final results.)

== Restrictions ==
The president is barred from being a member of the National Assembly, as well as holding any other government, public or private offices for the duration of their term. The president is also constitutionally forbidden from being involved in a leadership position of a political party while in office. The president is however allowed to be a member of a political party.

== Powers and privileges ==
The president of Bulgaria has a number of functions and powers that are regulated in Chapter 4 of the 1991 Constitution of Bulgaria.

=== Presidential powers ===
The following powers belong to the president of Bulgaria:

- The ability to give, restore or revoke Bulgarian citizenship, (Note: Revocation of citizenship can only be done to citizens who acquired their citizenship through the process of naturalization and not to native-born Bulgarians. It can only be applied after the citizen in question has been convicted of a serious crime and even then cannot be performed if the revocation would cause the person to enter into statelessness (i.e. has no other citizenship).) and refugee status.
- Appoint and dismiss senior government officials
- Exercise the right to pardon convicted criminals, as well as forgive 'uncollectible' debts owed to the government
- Rename villages, towns and cities, as well as objects of national importance
- Act as Supreme commander-in-chief of the Bulgarian Armed Forces
- Represent Bulgaria at home and abroad
- Schedule the Bulgarian national and local elections within the intervals designated by law
- Veto any legislative bill coming from the Bulgarian National Assembly by refusing to sign it after its passage in the assembly. (Note: In practice this power is very weak, as after a veto the bill is returned to the assembly for another vote, in which the veto can be overruled by a majority. If the veto is overruled, the President is constitutionally obliged to sign the bill into law.)
- Declares war, martial law or any other state of emergency (This is done with the assistance of the Consultative Council on National Security)
- Grant and award the orders, decorations, and medals of Bulgaria

=== Immunity ===
The president enjoys blanket legal immunity during his or her tenure and is not held responsible for any act performed while on duty, with the exception of treason or violation of the Bulgarian constitution. His or her authority may only be stripped via impeachment and may not be removed by any other institution. The president cannot be detained or imprisoned, and may not be prosecuted.

== List of office holders ==
List of presidents of Bulgaria from 1990 – till date.
No.	Portrait	Name (Birth–Death)	Term	Party	Endorsing parties	Election	Vice President
1		Zhelyu Zhelev (1935–2015)	22 January 1992 – 22 January 1997	SDS	SDS; DPS	1992	Blaga Dimitrova
1		Zhelyu Zhelev (1935–2015)	22 January 1992 – 22 January 1997	SDS	SDS; DPS	1992	Vacant: 6 July 1993 – 22 January 1997
2		Petar Stoyanov (1952–)	22 January 1997 – 22 January 2002	SDS	SDS; BZNS; DP; DPS (as ODS)	1996	Todor Kavaldzhiev
3		Georgi Parvanov (1957–)	22 January 2002 – 22 January 2012	BSP	BSP	2001	Angel Marin
3		Georgi Parvanov (1957–)	22 January 2002 – 22 January 2012	BSP	BSP; DPS; NDSV (as the three-party coalition)	2006	Angel Marin
4		Rosen Plevneliev (1964–)	22 January 2012 – 22 January 2017	GERB	GERB	2011	Margarita Popova
5		Rumen Radev (1963–)	22 January 2017 – 23 January 2026	Independent	BSP	2016	Iliana Iotova
5		Rumen Radev (1963–)	22 January 2017 – 23 January 2026	Independent	BSP; ITN; IBG-NI; PP	2021	Iliana Iotova
6		Iliana Iotova (1964–)	23 January 2026 – Present	BSP	BSP; ITN; IBG-NI; PP	2021	Vacant

== Living former presidents ==
Name	Mandate	Date of birth
Petar Stoyanov	1997 – 2002	25 May 1952 (age 74)
Georgi Parvanov	2002 – 2012	28 June 1957 (age 69)
Rosen Plevneliev	2012 – 2017	14 May 1964 (age 62)
Rumen Radev	2017 – 2026	18 June 1963 (age 63)

The most recent death of a former president was on 30 January 2015, when Zhelyu Zhelev died at age 79.

== Vice president ==
The president is assisted in their duties by the vice president of Bulgaria. The vice president replaces the president in case of absence. Upon the death, resignation or removal from office of the president, the vice president assumes the presidential office until the end of the term. The Constitution permits the president to delegate to the vice president certain powers, notably: to appoint and dismiss certain officials, issue pardons and amnesty, provide citizenship and refugee status. The VP enjoys the same privileges of immunity as the president and can only be dismissed from his office under the same procedure.

== Termination of office ==
According to the constitution, the mandate of the president is completed if and when:

- The presidential term expires
- The president resigns before the Constitutional Court
- The president is permanently unable to perform his/her duties due to serious illness
- The president dies while in office
- The president is impeached

=== Impeachment ===
Impeachment can begin if the president has committed treason or has violated the Constitution of Bulgaria, after at least a quarter of the members of the National Assembly deposit an accusatory act before the assembly. The act must be approved by a 2/3 supermajority of MPs in order to be accepted. If accepted, the case is referred to the Constitutional Court of Bulgaria, which must decide within a one-month time period whether the president is guilty or innocent of the crime they have been accused of by the Assembly. If the constitutional court finds that the president has committed treason or violated the constitution, the president is impeached and is stripped of their authority.

== Bulgarian presidential line of succession ==
1. Vice President of Bulgaria
2. Chairman of the National Assembly of Bulgaria
3. Prime Minister of Bulgaria

== Latest election ==
Candidate	Running mate	Party	First round		Second round	
Candidate	Running mate	Party	Votes	%	Votes	%
Iliana Iotova	Kiril Valchev	Independent (BSP–OL, PB, IS.BG, VMRO)	528,951	34.76	1,093,852	57.57
Andrey Gurov	Georgi Kandev	Independent (PP–DB)	486,232	31.95	750,251	39.48
Kostadin Kostadinov	Petar Volgin	Revival	190,910	12.55		
Radostin Vasilev	Krasimir Manov	Morality, Unity, Honour	70,127	4.61		
Ivelin Mihaylov	Yuliana Mateeva	Velichie	57,643	3.79		
Ivan Hristanov	Stoyanka Cherkezova	Independent (Edinenie)	36,407	2.39		
Georgi Dimov	Dimitar Shivikov	Independent	14,840	0.98		
Ivaylo Simeonov	Kosyo Stoychev	Independent (New Bulgaria)	14,209	0.93		
Rosen Milenov	Ivan Ivanov	Independent	8,368	0.55		
Nikolay Nenchev	Tsveta Kirilova	Bulgarian Agrarian National Union	5,783	0.38		
Ivanka Tsvetanova-Petkova	Panayot Kyuchukov	Independent	4,527	0.30		
Volen Siderov	Slavcho Velkov	Independent (Attack)	4,047	0.27		
Maria Koleva	Valeri Velkovski	Pravoto	3,818	0.25		
Rumyana Chenalova	Georgi Georgiev	Independent	3,687	0.24		
Ventsislav Angelov	Atanas Stefanov	Truth and Only Truth	2,856	0.19		
Plamen Paskov	Svetozar Saev	Independent (KOY)	2,810	0.18		
Aleksandar Tomov	Aleksandar Garibov	Bulgarian Social Democracy – EuroLeft	2,505	0.16		
Yordan Maldzhanski	Valentin Hristov	Independent	2,505	0.16		
Nako Stefanov	Nina Lambova	Independent	2,460	0.16		
Boyan Rasate	Yordan Manasiev	Independent (BNS–ND)	2,321	0.15		
Kamen Taskov	Galya Ivanova	Independent	1,752	0.12		
Metodi Bachvarov	Lenin Stanoev	Independent	1,563	0.10		
Velichka Georgieva	Rosen Ivanov	Independent	1,397	0.09		
Iskra Nedeva	Stoyan Georgiev	Independent	1,213	0.08		
Lachezar Avramov	Ivaylo Atanasov	Independent	1,165	0.08		
Boris Anzov	Branimir Michev	Independent	1,141	0.07		
Ivo Lulchev	Stefan Popov	Independent	1,120	0.07		
None of the above			67,353	4.43	56,080	2.95
Total			1,521,710	100.00	1,900,183	100.00
Valid votes			1,521,710	99.79	1,900,183	99.86
Invalid/blank votes			3,278	0.21	2,750	0.14
Total votes			1,524,988	100.00	1,902,933	100.00
Registered voters/turnout			6,637,238	22.98	6,637,274	28.67
Source: Electoral Commission of Bulgaria (First round), Electoral Commission of Bulgaria (Second round)

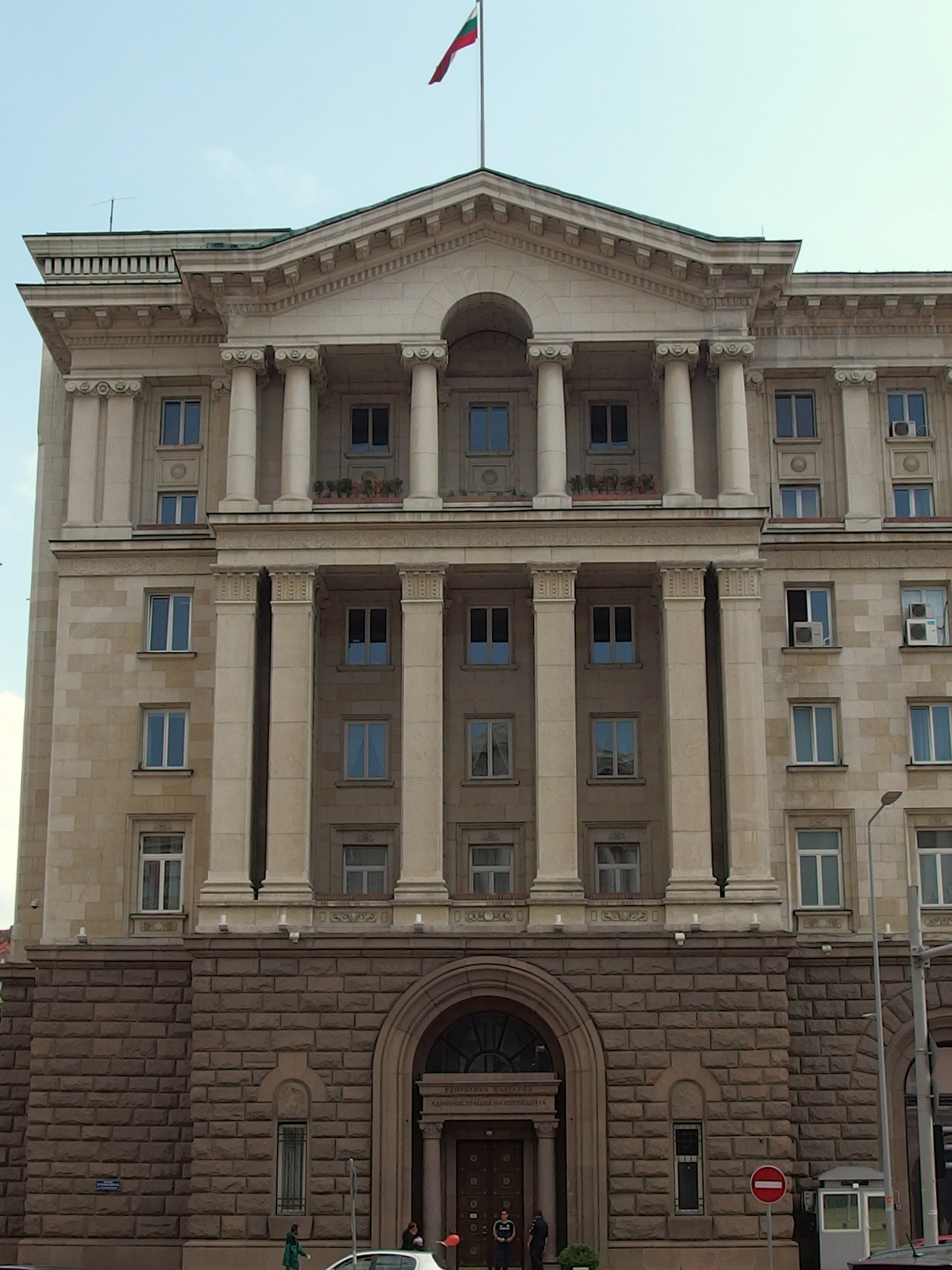
The Bulgarian President's Office

== See also ==
- Corruption in Bulgaria
- Government of Bulgaria
- History of Bulgaria
- List of Bulgarian monarchs
- List of heads of state of Bulgaria
- List of presidents of Bulgaria (1990–present)
- Politics of Bulgaria
- Prime Minister of Bulgaria
  - List of prime ministers of Bulgaria
