= List of international prime ministerial trips made by Andrey Gyurov =

This is a list of international prime ministerial trips made by Andrey Gyurov, who served as the Prime Minister of Bulgaria from 19 February 2026 to 8 May 2026.

== Summary ==
Gyurov has visited 3 countries during his tenure as prime minister. The number of visits per country where Gyurov has traveled are:

- One visit to Belgium, Cyprus and Ukraine

Country	Location(s)	Dates	Details
Belgium	Brussels	19–20 March	Gyurov attended the European Council.
Ukraine	Kyiv	30 March	Met with President Volodymyr Zelenskyy and signed a 10-year bilateral security cooperation agreement with Ukraine.
Cyprus	Nicosia	23–24 April	Gyurov attended an informal meeting of the European Council summit.
