= Aleksandar Tomov =

Aleksandar Tomov may refer to:

- Aleksandar Tomov (wrestler)
- Aleksandar Tomov (politician)
