= Georgi Kandev =

Former secretary general

- Георги Кандев
- Kandev in 2026

Acting Secretary General of the Ministry of Interior
- In office 27 February 2026 – 8 June 2026
- Prime Minister: Andrey Gyurov; Rumen Radev
- Minister: Emil Dechev; Ivan Demerdzhiev

Personal details
- Born: Georgi Dimitrov Kandev; 27 February 1975 (age 51) Gotse Delchev, PR Bulgaria
- Party: Independent
- Education: Academy of the Ministry of Interior; South-West University
- Occupation: Law enforcement officer; political candidate

Georgi Dimitrov Kandev (Bulgarian: Георги Димитров Кандев, born 27 February 1975) is a Bulgarian law enforcement officer who served as acting Secretary General of the Ministry of Interior from February to June in 2026. In advance to the 2026 election, he announced his candidacy for Vice President of Bulgaria on a presidential ticket alongside Andrey Gyurov.
