= Georgi Georgiev (politician) =

Bulgarian politician (born 1986)

- Георги Георгиев
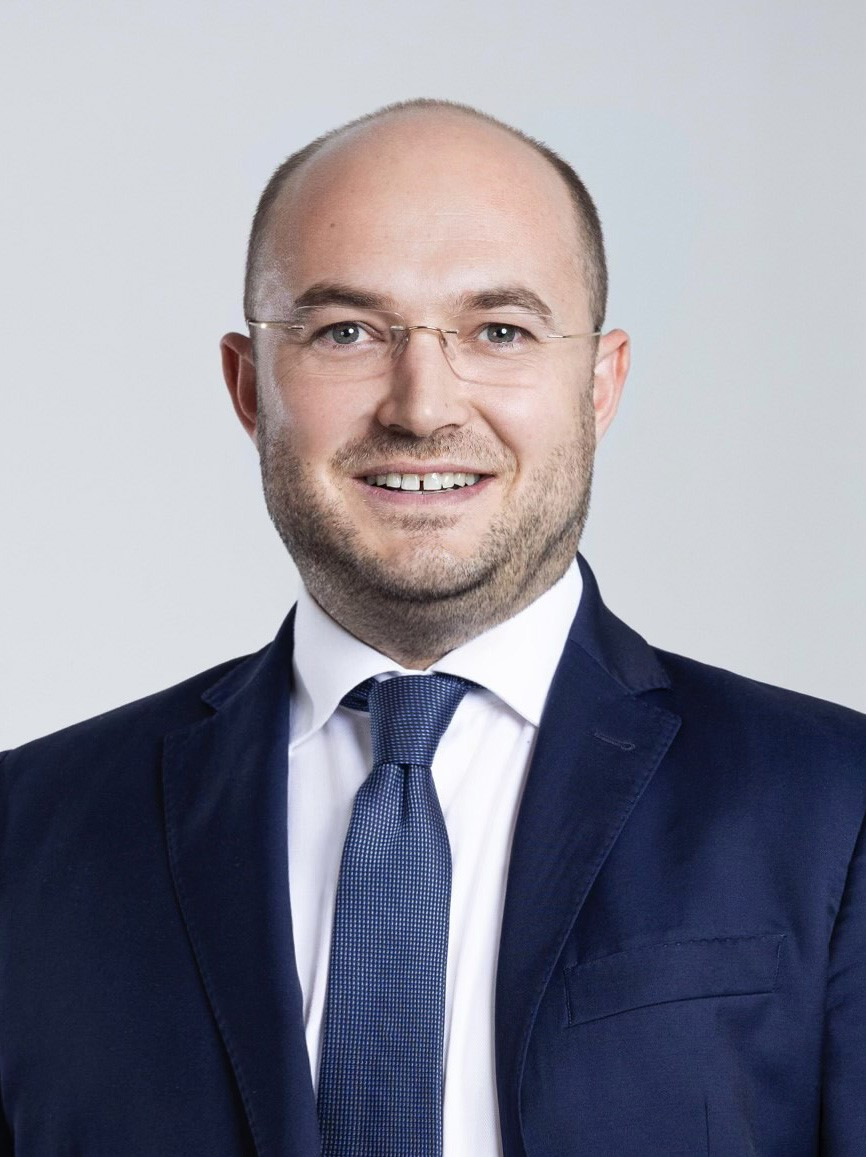
- Official portrait, 2024

Minister of Justice
- In office 16 January 2025 – 19 February 2026
- Prime Minister: Rosen Zhelyazkov
- Preceded by: Mariya Pavlova
- Succeeded by: Andrey Yankulov

Member of the National Assembly
- In office 19 June 2024 – 16 January 2025
- Constituency: 16th MMC - Plovdiv

Speaker of the Sofia City Council
- In office 23 September 2021 – 13 November 2023
- Preceded by: Elen Gerdzhikov
- Succeeded by: Tsvetomir Petrov

Member of the Sofia City Council
- In office 12 November 2019 – 19 June 2024

Personal details
- Born: Georgi Valentinov Georgiev; 26 May 1986 (age 40) Radnevo, PR Bulgaria
- Party: GERB
- Education: Sofia University
- Occupation: Politician; lawyer

Georgi Valentinov Georgiev (Bulgarian: Георги Валентинов Георгиев; born 26 May 1986) is a Bulgarian politician who has served as Minister of Justice since 2025. A member of the GERB party, he previously served as Member of the National Assembly from 2024 to 2025, Speaker of the Sofia City Council from 2021 to 2023 and Member of the Sofia City Council from 2019 to 2024.
