= Andrey Yankulov =

Bulgarian politician (born 1980)

- Андрей Янкулов
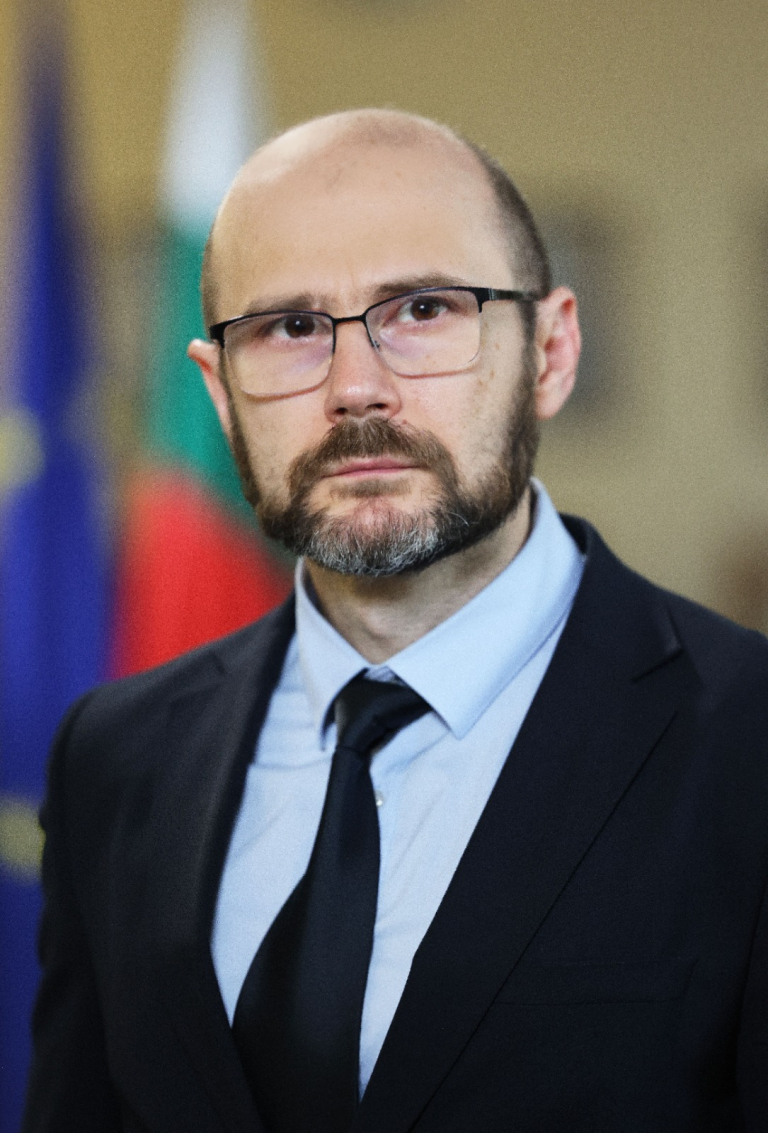
- Official portrait, 2026

Deputy Prime Minister Minister of Justice
- In office 19 February 2026 – 8 May 2026
- Prime Minister: Andrey Gurov
- Preceded by: Georgi Georgiev (as Minister of Justice)
- Succeeded by: Galab Donev (as Deputy Prime Minister)

Personal details
- Born: 1980 (age 45–46)
- Party: Independent

Andrey Yankulov (Bulgarian: Андрей Янкулов; born 1980) is a Bulgarian politician serving as deputy prime minister and as minister of justice in 2026. From August to November 2014, he served as deputy minister of the interior. From 2014 to 2016, he served as deputy minister of justice.
