= Maria Nedina =

Bulgarian politician

- Мария Недина
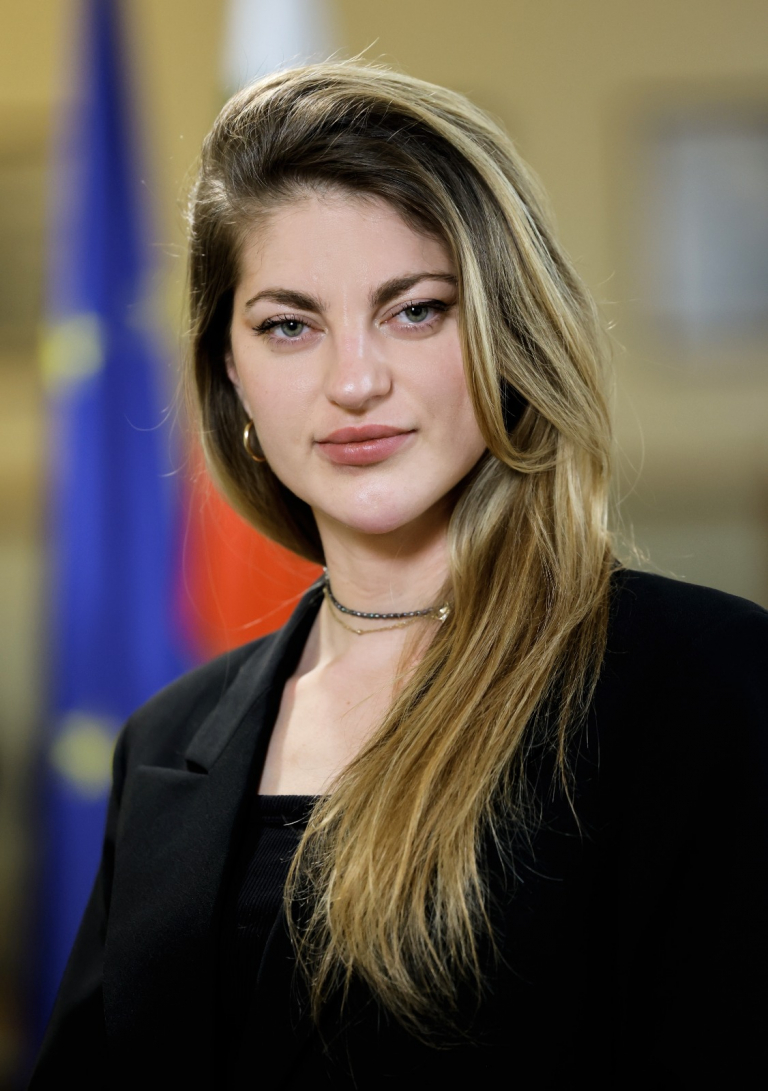
- Official portrait, 2026

Deputy Prime Minister for European Funds
- In office 19 February 2026 – 8 May 2026
- Prime Minister: Andrey Gyurov

Personal details
- Party: Independent

Maria Nedina (Bulgarian: Мария Недина) is a Bulgarian politician who served as deputy prime minister for european funds in 2026. From 2023 to 2024, she served as chief of staff to Julian Popov.
