= Iliana Iotova =

President of Bulgaria since 2026

Her Excellency Iliana Iotova
- Илияна Йотова
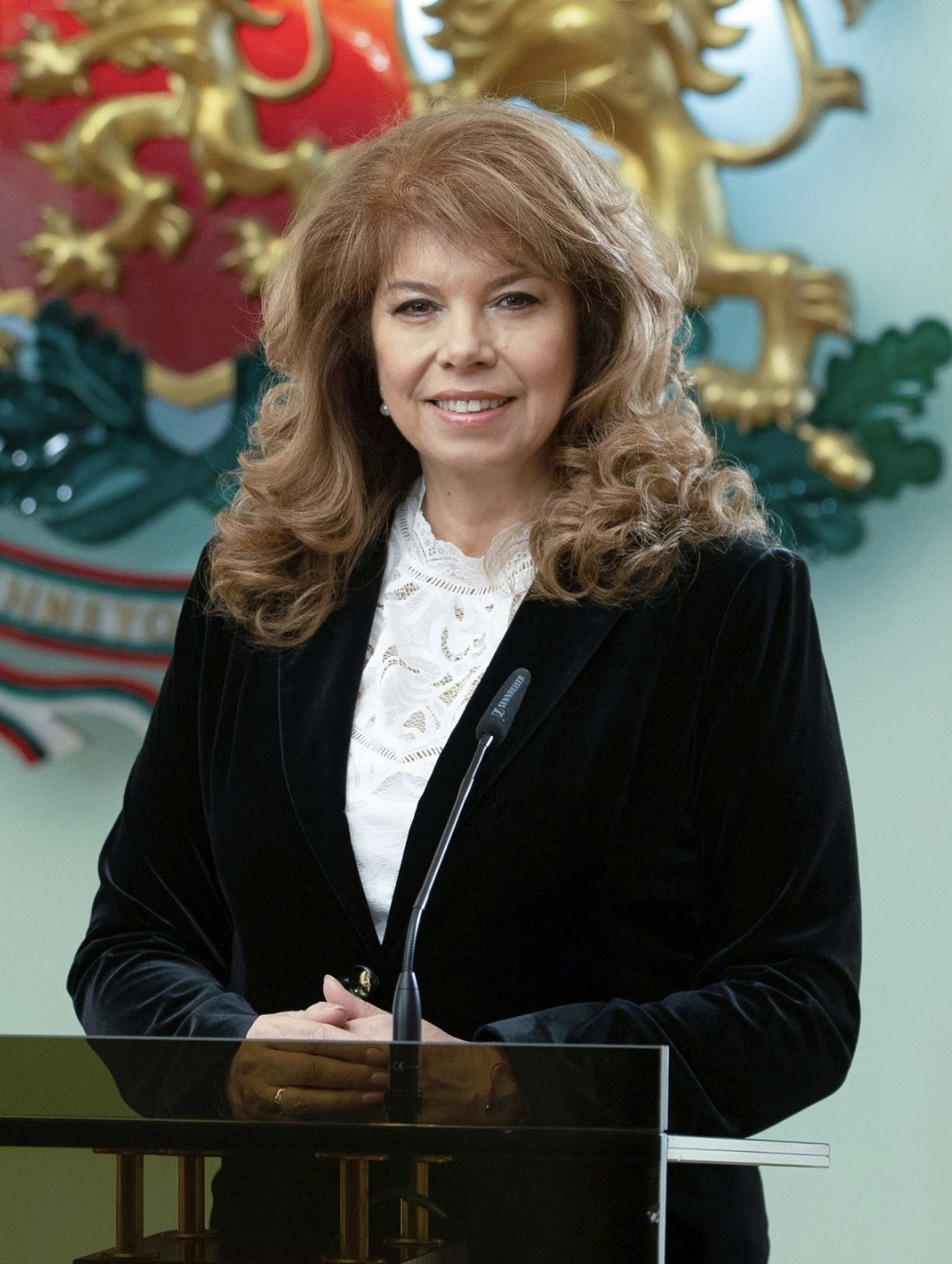
- Official portrait, 2026

President of Bulgaria
- Incumbent
- Assumed office 23 January 2026
- Prime Minister: Rosen Zhelyazkov; Andrey Gurov (caretaker); Rumen Radev
- Vice President: Kiril Valchev (elect)
- Preceded by: Rumen Radev

Vice President of Bulgaria
- In office 22 January 2017 – 23 January 2026
- President: Rumen Radev
- Preceded by: Margarita Popova
- Succeeded by: Kiril Valchev (elect)

Member of the European Parliament for Bulgaria
- In office 6 June 2007 – 16 January 2017
- Preceded by: Constituency established
- Succeeded by: Petar Kurumbashev

Member of the National Assembly
- In office 18 August 2005 – 20 May 2007
- Constituency: 24th MMC – Sofia

Personal details
- Born: Iliana Malinova Todorova; 24 October 1964 (age 62) Sofia, PR Bulgaria
- Party: BSP (since 1997)
- Spouse: Andrey Iotov (m. 1985)
- Children: 1
- Education: Lycée Français de Sofia; Sofia University; École nationale d'administration University of Strasbourg
- Occupation: Politician; journalist

Iliana Malinova Iotova (Note: Bulgarian: Илияна Малинова Йотова, pronounced [iliˈjanɐ mɐ'linovɐ 'jotovɐ]. Sometimes spelled as Iliyana Malinova Yotova as per the country's official romanization.) (née Todorova; born 24 October 1964) is a Bulgarian politician and journalist who has served as president of Bulgaria since 23 January 2026. She is the first woman to hold the office. A member of the Bulgarian Socialist Party (BSP), Iotova previously served as vice president under Rumen Radev from 2017 to 2026, when she became the first Bulgarian vice president to assume the presidency intra-term due to Radev's resignation.

== Early life ==
Iliana Malinova Iotova was born in Sofia, People's Republic of Bulgaria on 24 October 1964. She studied in the Lycée Français de Sofia. She received a degree in Bulgarian and French philology from the University of Sofia and later specialized at the École nationale d'administration (ENA, National School of Administration) in Strasbourg, France, and the Center for European Studies (CEES) of the University of Strasbourg.

In the 1980s, Iotova worked as a nurse at the First Hospital of Sofia St John the Baptist. From 1990 to 1997, she worked at Bulgarian National Television as a reporter, editor, director, presenter of news and current affairs programmes and also became head of the News and Current Affairs Directorate. She then worked as the director of the press service of the Bulgarian Socialist Party in 1997.

== Political career ==
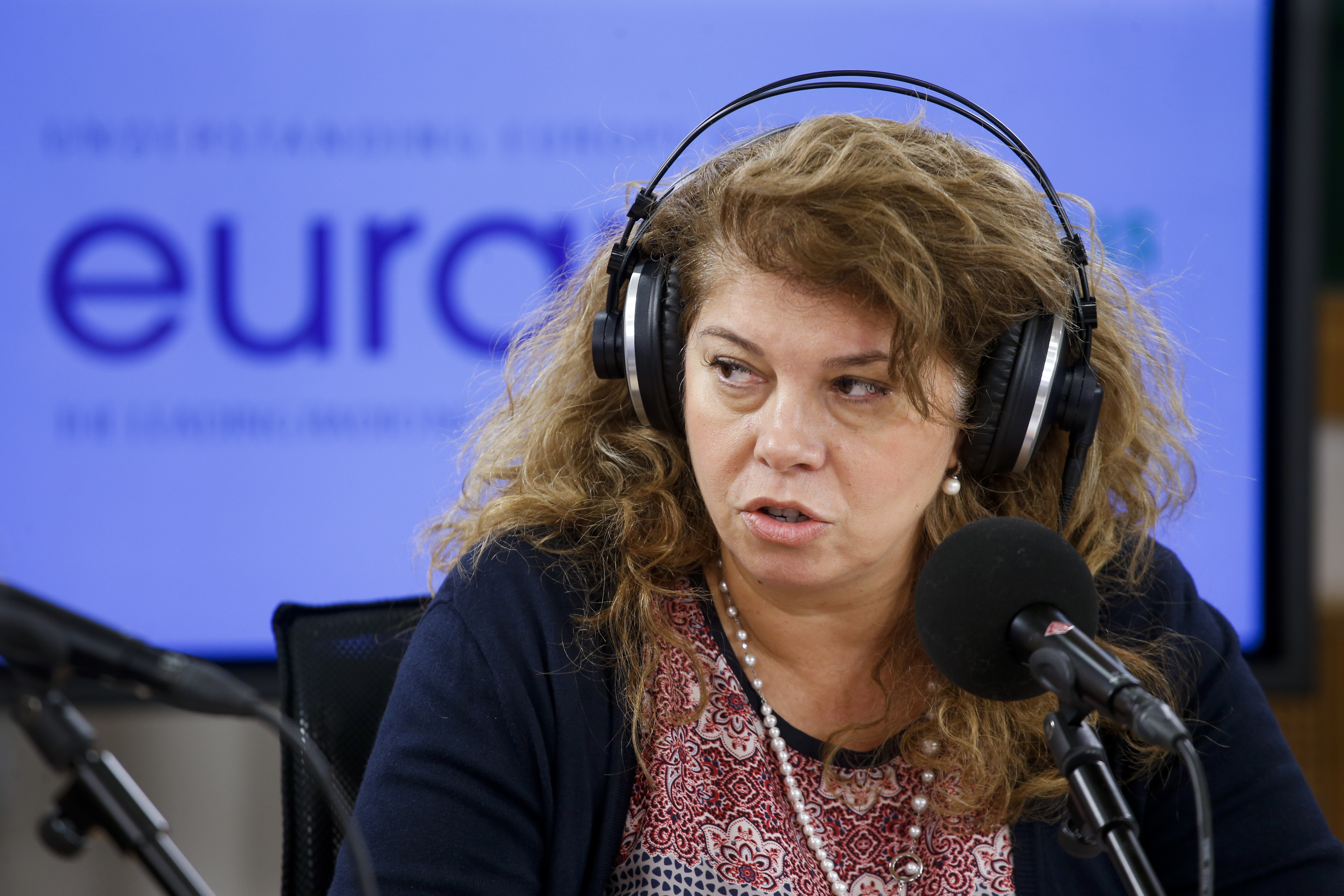
Iotova during a debate on the Schengen area, 19 April 2016

In the 2005 national elections, Iotova was elected to the National Assembly, an office she held until 2007. During her term, she headed the Bulgarian delegation to the Assemblée parlementaire de la Francophonie and member of the delegation to the Parliamentary Assembly of the Council of Europe.

=== Member of the European Parliament (2007–2017) ===
Iotova became a Member of the European Parliament in 2007 and was re-elected in 2014. There she was part of the Progressive Alliance of Socialists and Democrats group.

In parliament, Iotova served on the Committee on the Internal Market and Consumer Protection (2007–09), the Committee on Fisheries (2009–14), and the Committee on Petitions (2009–14). From 2012 until 2013, she was also a member of the Special Committee on Organised Crime, Corruption and Money Laundering. From the 2014 elections, she served as vice-chairwoman of the Committee on Civil Liberties, Justice and Home Affairs, under the leadership of chairman Claude Moraes. In this capacity, she was her parliamentary group's rapporteur on a 2015 report calling for the equitable distribution of 40,000 refugees across the European Union.

In addition to her committee assignments, Iotova served as chairwoman of the parliament's delegation to the EU-Montenegro Stabilisation and Association Parliamentary Committee and as member of the delegation to the Parliamentary Assembly of the Mediterranean. She was also a member of the European Parliament Intergroup on Integrity (Transparency, Anti-Corruption and Organized Crime).

=== Vice President of Bulgaria (2017–2026) ===
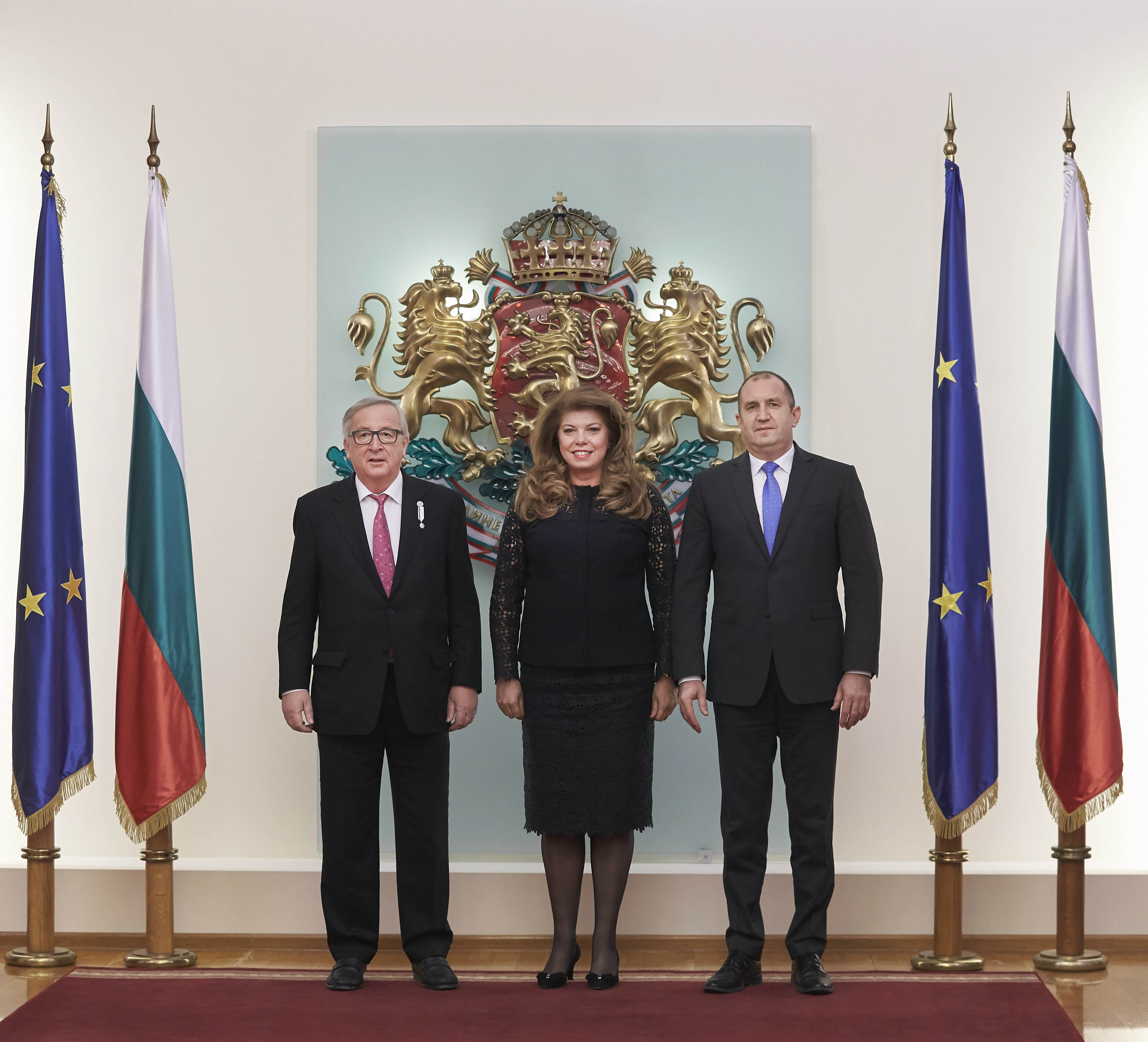
Iotova between President Radev and European Commission President Jean-Claude Juncker in Sofia, 12 January 2018

Ahead of Bulgaria's 2016 presidential elections, Iotova was officially nominated as the Bulgarian Socialist Party's running mate for presidential candidate Rumen Radev. After her election to the Vice Presidency, she resigned her MEP seat. As Vice President, Iotova focused on relations with Bulgarian communities abroad and on promoting Bulgarian education and language. They both were sworn in on 19 January 2017 and began their office on 22 January.

On 1 February 2021, President Radev officially announced that he and Iliana Iotova would run for a second term in the 2021 general election. In the second round, held on 21 November, Rumen Radev defeated Gerdjikov with 66% of the vote, thus securing a second term in office for Iotova as well. She was sworn in on 19 January 2022 and her term officially began on 22 January.

On 21 March 2024, Iotova participated in an educational forum in Lisbon, which she sponsored, and in which she called for the need to create a Bulgarian cultural institution abroad to promote Bulgarian culture and language internationally.

=== President of Bulgaria (2026–present) ===
During an address to the nation on 19 January 2026, the then-president Rumen Radev announced his intention to resign. The following day, Radev submitted his resignation as President to the Constitutional Court. Three days later on 23 January, the Constitutional Court formally accepted Radev's resignation, making Iotova the country's first female president. Shortly after the ruling, Radev left the "Dondukov 2" palace together with Iotova, the new President, and addressed supporters, promising a unified struggle at the upcoming legislative elections. Iotova will complete the remainder of Radev's term until the 2026 Bulgarian presidential election. She is a candidate with running mate Kiril Valchev.

On 11 February, Iotova nominated Andrey Gyurov, the deputy governor of the Bulgarian National Bank, as acting prime minister.

Iotova won a plurality of 35% of the vote against Andrey Gyurov's 32% in the first round on 25 October. She was elected after the second round, held on 1 November, receiving 58% of the vote, compared to Gyurov's 39%, making her Bulgaria’s first elected female president.

== Personal life ==
Aside from her native Bulgarian, she is fluent in French and speaks Russian and English. Iotova married Andrey Iotov, a doctor she met at the First Hospital of Sofia St. John the Baptist in 1985. They have one child.

== Notes ==
Political offices
Preceded by Margarita Popova	Vice President of Bulgaria; 2017–2026	Vacant
Preceded by Rumen Radev	President of Bulgaria; 2026–present	Incumbent
