= Bulgarian Social Democracy – EuroLeft =

Political party in Bulgaria

Bulgarian Social Democracy–Euro-Left Българска Социалдемокрация-Евролевица
- Leader: Aleksandr Tomov
- Founded: 1997
- Split from: Bulgarian Socialist Party
- Ideology: Social democracy Pro-Europeanism
- National affiliation: BSP – United Left
- International affiliation: Socialist International (1999–2011)
- National Assembly: 0 / 240
- European Parliament: 0 / 17

Website
- bgsd.eu

Bulgarian Social Democracy – EuroLeft (Bulgarian: Българска социалдемокрация – Евролевица, romanized: Bŭlgarska sotsialdemokratsiya – Evrolevitsa; BSDE), formerly Bulgarian EuroLeft (Bulgarian: Българска евролевица, romanized: Bŭlgarska evrolevitsa; BEL) is a pro-Western social-democratic political party in Bulgaria. The party was established on 22 February 1997 in Sofia. The party was formed by former members of the Bulgarian Socialist Party.

The BEL was admitted into the Socialist International as an observer affiliate in 1999. The party was in favour of Bulgaria's accession to the European Union.

== History ==
=== Beginnings ===
The party contested the 1997 Bulgarian parliamentary election as the Civil Union for the Republic – Bulgarian Euro-Left, winning 5.5% of the vote and 14 seats in the National Assembly. Two deputies from the Bulgarian Business Bloc joined the BEL in February 1998. The party was part of the opposition in the National Assembly.

In 1998, the coalition voted to convert itself into a party, establishing a National Council to lead it.

In 2000, BEL formed into a new party, BSDE.

This new party competed in the 2001 election, and failed to win any seats alongside minor party allies. and following the election, a split off party from the Bulgarian Social Democratic Party, the Bulgarian United Social Democratic Party led by Valkana Todorova, merged into BSDE.

== Alliances ==
=== Rose Coalition (2005) ===
In the 2005 election, the party took part in the election in the Rose Coalition. The composition of the coalition was as follows.

Party	Leader	Ideology
Bulgarian Social Democracy – EuroLeft (BSDE)	Aleksandr Tomov	Social democracy
National Movement for Rights and Freedoms (NDPS)	Güner Tahir	Minority Rights
United Bloc of Labour (OBT)	Krastyo Petkov	Social democracy

=== Coalition of the Dissatisfied ===
In the 2007 election, the party took part in the election in the Coalition of the Dissatisfied. The composition of the coalition was as follows.

Party	Leader	Ideology
Bulgarian Social Democracy – EuroLeft (BSDE)	Aleksandr Tomov	Social democracy
Christian Social Union (KSS)	Grisha Gospodinov	

=== Together for Change ===
In both the April and July 2021 elections, the party took part in the Together for Change coalition. The composition of the coalition was as follows.

Party	Leader	Ideology
Bulgarian Social Democracy – EuroLeft (BSDE)	Aleksandr Tomov	Social democracy
European Security and Integration (ESI)	Toma Tomov	Roma Minority politics
Patriotism 2000 (R2000)	Julian Ivanov	

=== Rose Coalition (June 2024) ===
In the June 2024 election, the party took part in the election in the Rose Coalition. The coalition included two of the three former members of the 2005 coalition. NDPS last took part in elections with DOST in 2017. The composition of the coalition was as follows.

Party	Leader	Ideology
Bulgarian Social Democracy – EuroLeft (BSDE)	Aleksandr Tomov	Social democracy
United Bloc of Labour (OBT)	Krastyo Petkov	Social democracy Labourism
Patriotism 2000 (R2000)	Julian Ivanov	

=== BSP – United Left ===
In the run up to the October 2024 election, BSDE joined the BSP alliance.

== Election results ==
=== National Assembly ===
Election	Leader	Votes	%	Seats	+/–	Government
1997	Aleksandar Tomov	234,058	5.50 (#4)	14 / 240	New	Opposition
2001	Aleksandar Tomov	44,637	0.98 (#8)	0 / 240	▼14	Extra-parliamentary
2005 (Note: Ran as part of the Rose Coalition (with NDPS and OBT).)	Aleksandar Tomov	47,410	1.13 (#9)	0 / 240	0	Extra parliamentary
2009	Aleksandar Tomov	Did not contest				
2013	Aleksandar Tomov	Did not contest				
2014	Aleksandar Tomov	9,431	0.29 (#16)	0 / 240	0	Extra parliamentary
2017 (Note: Ran as part of the Coalition of the Dissatisfied (with KSS).)	Aleksandar Tomov	5,945	0.17 (#15)	0 / 240	0	Extra parliamentary
Apr 2021 (Note: Ran as part of the Together for Change coalition (with ESI and R2000).)	Aleksandar Tomov	3,485	0.11 (#20)	0 / 240	0	Extra-parliamentary
Jul 2021 (Note: Ran again as Together for Change.)	Aleksandar Tomov	3,445	0.12 (#18)	0 / 240	0	Extra-parliamentary
Nov 2021	Aleksandar Tomov	13,710	0.52 (#10)	0 / 240	0	Extra-parliamentary
2022	Aleksandar Tomov	5,343	0.21 (#17)	0 / 240	0	Extra-parliamentary
2023	Aleksandar Tomov	2,633	0.10 (#17)	0 / 240	0	Extra-parliamentary
Jun 2024 (Note: Ran as part of the Rose Coalition (with OBT and R2000).)	Aleksandar Tomov	2,206	0.10 (#26)	0 / 240	0	Extra-parliamentary
Oct 2024 (Note: Ran in the BSP – United Left alliance.)	Aleksandar Tomov	184,403	7.32 (#5)	0 / 240	0	Extra-parliamentary
2026	Aleksandar Tomov	97,753	2.97 (#8)	0 / 240	0	Extra-parliamentary

=== European Parliament ===
Election	List leader	Votes	%	Seats	+/–	EP Group
2009	Aleksandr Marinov	14,132	0.55 (#11)	0 / 18	New	–
2014	Did not contest			0 / 18	0	–
2019	Did not contest			0 / 18	0	–
2024 (Note: Run as part of the Rose Coalition (with OBT and R2000).)	Aleksandr Tomov	2,294	0.11 (#25)	0 / 18	0	–

=== President ===
Election	Candidate	First round			Second round		
Election	Candidate	Votes	%	Rank	Votes	%	Result
2026	Aleksandr Tomov	2,505	0.16	17th	—N/a		Lost
