= Kiril Valchev =

Vice President-elect of Bulgaria

- Кирил Вълчев
- Valchev in 2022

Vice President-elect of Bulgaria
- Assuming office 22 January 2027
- President: Iliana Iotova
- Succeeding: Iliana Iotova (Note: Office vacant between 23 January 2026 and 22 January 2027)

Personal details
- Born: Kirill Alexandrov Vylchev; 24 May 1973 (age 53) Sofia, Bulgaria
- Education: Sofia University
- Occupation: Lawyer, journalist

Kiril Aleksandrov Valchev (born 24 May 1973) is a Bulgarian lawyer and journalist who is the Vice President-elect of Bulgaria. He previously served as the director general of the state news agency BTA.

In the 2026 Bulgarian presidential election, he was elected Vice President.

== Biography ==
He graduated with a law degree from Sofia University. He completed a radio management course at Deutsche Welle and an internship at the Bulgarian section of the BBC in London. In the first half of the 1990s, he was employed in the foreign news department of BTA and began hosting the current affairs programs Sedmicata (in 1994) and Godinata (in 1996) on Darik Radio. For several years, he worked as an academic at his alma mater in Sofia. In 2005, he became managing partner of a law firm specializing in media and intellectual property law. In the same year, he assumed the positions of board secretary and legal advisor at SBNEM, the association of Bulgarian public media.

In January 2021, the National Assembly elected him Director General of the BTA agency. In December 2025, he was appointed to this position for a second term. In September 2026, President Iliana Iotova nominated Valchev as her candidate for Vice President of Bulgaria in the presidential elections of the same year. In the first round on 25 October 2026, they took first place with 34.76% of the vote, thus advancing to the second round.
