= Aleksandar Tomov (politician) =

Bulgarian politician, economist, and academic

- Александър Томов
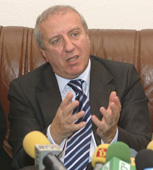

Personal details
- Born: 27 April 1954 (age 72) Sofia, Bulgaria
- Party: Bulgarian Social Democracy – EuroLeft (2003-present)
- Other political affiliations: Bulgarian Euro-Left (1997–2001); Independent (1995–1997/2001–2003); Bulgarian Socialist Party (1990–1995); Bulgarian Communist Party (before 1990)
- Children: 3 (Including Rada and Lidia)
- Profession: Academic, Politician

Aleksandar Trifonov Tomov (Bulgarian: Александър Трифонов Томов) (born 27 April 1954) is a Bulgarian politician, economist, and academic.

== Biography ==
=== Education ===
In the 1970s, Tomov was a student at the UNWE and Leningrad University. He completed his primary, secondary and university education with excellent marks. In 1984, Tomov earned a doctoral degree in the field of economics. Tomov has made specializations in political science and macroeconomics in Sofia and London.

=== Academic career ===
In addition to his political career, Tomov has also worked as a professor and lecturer in the political science department (of which he is one of the founders in 1985) at Sofia University. He has further taught courses at the Karl Marx Institute of Economics in Sofia. Tomov has authored six books. In 1995, Tomov was appointed as the director of the EastWest Institute in New York City for a period of three years.

=== Politics ===
In 1990, Tomov was elected to the 7th Grand National Assembly of Bulgaria as a member of the Bulgarian Socialist Party. He was also a member of the 36th and 38th National Parliaments. Tomov served as Deputy-Prime Minister in the Dimitar Popov government, the first one since the collapse of the communist system in 1989.

In 1993, he established the Citizens' Union for the Republic (Bulgarian: Гражданско обединение за републиката), which was initially not envisioned as a political party. However, it evolved into the Bulgarian Euro-Left in 1997.

Tomov was formerly vice-chairman of the supreme council (Bulgarian: Висш съвет) of the Bulgarian Socialist Party and was among the founders of the Bulgarian Euro-Left in 1997, eventually being elected (and reelected in 2000) as its leader after receiving more votes than his main opponent Elena Poptodorova. The Euro-Left officially became a political party in 1998. He has been critical of the delayed social democratization of the BSP party in the 1990s.

In 1996, Tomov was a candidate to become President of Bulgaria (with Lyudmil Marinchevski as his running mate) and finished in fourth place, earning 3.16% of the votes cast.

Since 2003, Tomov has been the leader of the Bulgarian Social Democracy party. In 2013, his party expressed support for the "Bulgarian Spring" (Bulgarian: Българска пролет) protest movement.

=== Kremikovtzi AD ===
In 2009, Tomov came under legal scrutiny due to allegedly abusing his position during his time as chairman of the managerial board of Kremikovtzi. In early 2011, the Sofia City Court found Tomov guilty of siphoning off money (15 million leva) from Kremikovtzi, imposing a prison sentence. In 2013, the Appellate Court decided that the case needs a review and returned it to the court of first instance, with the trial recommencing in April 2014. In February 2015, the Sofia City Court declared Tomov not culpable.

=== Sport ===
Tomov is also well known for his involvement in various capacities with the CSKA Sofia football club. He was instrumental in bringing Indian businessman Pramod Mittal to Bulgaria in relation to a number of Kremikovtzi deals. Mittal eventually became the owner of the "armymen" in December 2006 before selling the club to Titan Sport EAD in early 2009. Tomov served as the president of CSKA Sofia between 5 December 2006 and 5 June 2008 as well as from July 2008 to 9 April 2009.

In the summer of 2008, Tomov was blamed by some sections of the reds' supporters due to the team not receiving a license for European club competitions. In the summer of 2013, he was credited with playing a vital role in preventing the team's likely bankruptcy. Tomov was the main CSKA Sofia shareholder and de facto owner (with Lira Investment providing the main part of the financing) of the club between the second half of 2013 and April 2015. He has been against the idea of a deliberate declaration of insolvency and the creation of a new unofficial successor company as a solution to the debts accumulated by the club.

=== Personal life ===
Tomov has three children named Rada, Lidia and Alexander.He also has four grandchildren, daniel, robert, Alexia and the Eleni. His wife Kalina is an expert on psychology. Tomov's sister, Tatyana, is an academic at Sofia University whose area of expertise covers the social policies of European countries. One of Tomov's great-grandfathers perished in the April Uprising.

In addition to his native Bulgarian, he is also conversant in English and Russian. In an interview with the press, Tomov identified drawing as one of his hobbies. Since February 2015, Tomov has a profile on Facebook.

== Honours ==
Churchill award (1999) - for his contribution to the development of Bulgaria - United Kingdom relations.
