= Nikolay Nenchev =

Bulgarian politician

- Николай Ненчев
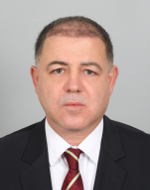

Minister of Defence
- In office 7 November 2014 – 27 January 2017
- Prime Minister: Boyko Borisov
- Preceded by: Velizar Shalamanov
- Succeeded by: Stefan Yanev

Personal details
- Born: 11 August 1966 (age 60) Yambol, PR Bulgaria
- Party: Bulgarian Agrarian National Union

Nikolay Nankov Nenchev (Bulgarian: Николай Нанков Ненчев), is a Bulgarian politician, Chairman of the Bulgarian Agricultural People's Union (BAPU), Minister of Defence of Bulgaria as part of the Second Borisov Government from 2014 to 2017.

== Career ==
He was born on 11 August 1966 in the town of Yambol. He earned a Master of Laws and Political Science degree and specialized international relations at Sofia University “St. Kliment Ohridski”.

Before the democratic changes, he took part in an illegal initiative committee that drafted a declaration to the National Assembly of the People's Republic of Bulgaria with the appeal to restore the Bulgarian Agricultural People's Union “Nikola Petkov” forbidden in 1947. On 11 June 1989, the declaration was taken to Sofia and was broadcast by Radio Free Europe. After 10 November 1989, Nikolay Nenchev was elected Chairman of the Independent Students’ Association. He worked actively towards the restoration of the agricultural societies in the whole country, and took part in the national rallies and meetings which lead to the creation of the Union of the Democratic Forces, a part of which is the Bulgarian Agricultural People's Union “Nikola Petkov”.

In 1992, he became a member of the Executive Board of BAPU, and since 1994, he had been Chairman of the Youth Agricultural Union. By virtue of a decree issued by the President of the Republic of Bulgaria Petar Stoyanov, Nikolay Nenchev was appointed Head of the Cabinet of the Vice President Todor Kavaldjiev. Nikolay Nenchev is a founder and Vice Chairman of the European Integration Association, coordinator of the Program “Cross-border Cooperation and European Integration for Southeast Europe”. The Association was established with the goal to assist the acceptance of the People's Republic of Bulgaria in the European Union. Since 2003, he has been teaching at the New Bulgarian University as a research associate. In 2007, Nikolay Nenchev was a postgraduate researcher at the European Parliament in the Legal Affairs Committee on Constitutional Affairs and in the Foreign Policy Committee. In 2011, he was elected Chairman of the BAPU, and worked as a legal consultant. He was a Member of the 43rd National Assembly.

From 7 November 2014 until 26 January 2017, Nikolay Nenchev was Minister of Defence of the Republic of Bulgaria. In his capacity as Minister of Defence, throughout all sessions and meetings at NATO and the EU, he pursued clear and coherent policy of defending the Bulgarian national Interests and had adopted a categorical and strong pro Euro-Atlantic stance.

Political offices
Preceded by Velizar Shalamanov	Minister of Defence of Bulgaria; 7 November 2014 – 27 January 2017	Succeeded by Stefan Yanev
