= Petar Volgin =

Bulgarian politician (born 1969)

MEP Petar Volgin
- Петър Волгин
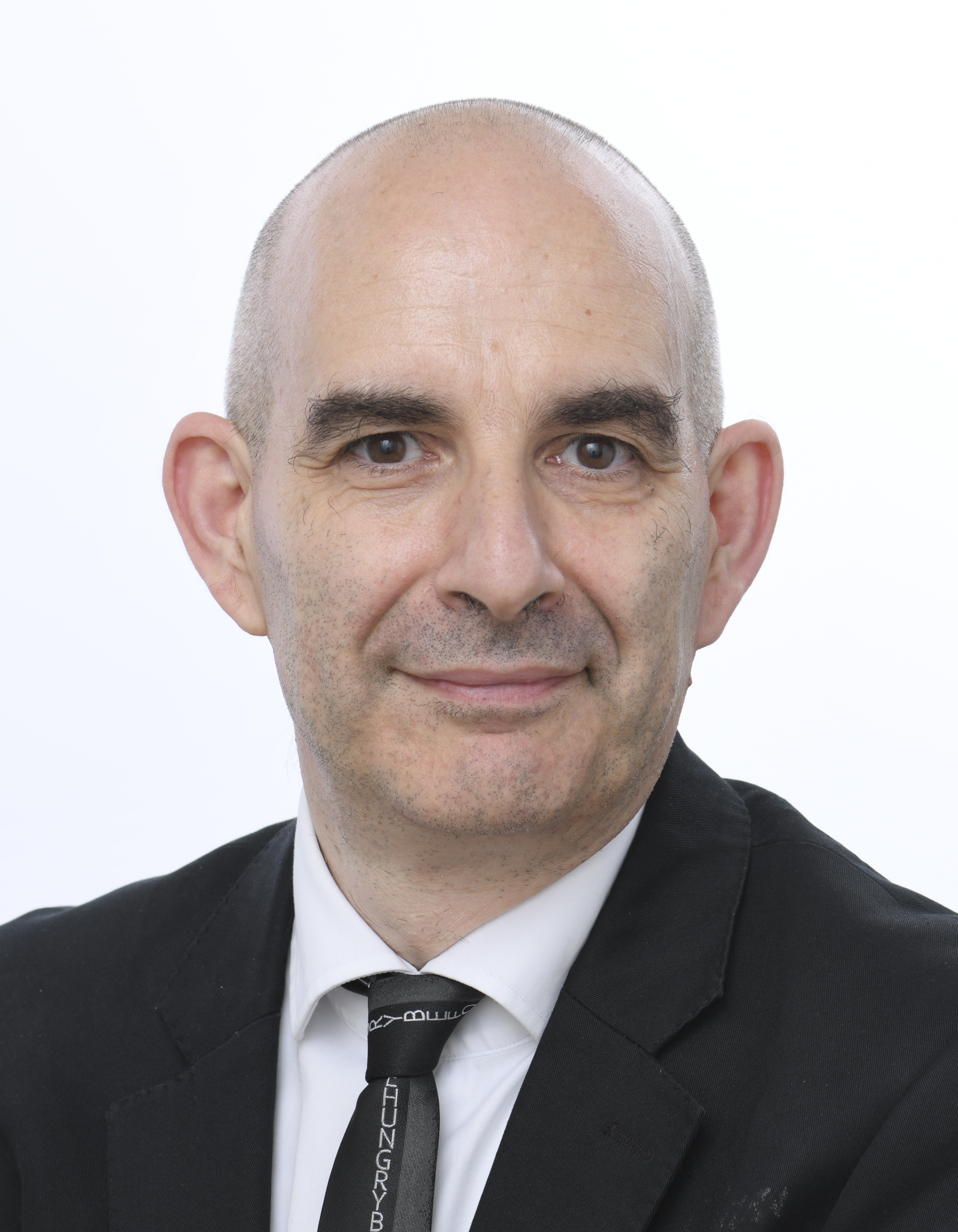
- Volgin in 2024

Member of the European Parliament for Bulgaria
- Incumbent
- Assumed office 16 July 2024
- Preceded by: Petar Vitanov

Personal details
- Born: Petar Petrov Georgiev; 28 September 1969 (age 57) Sofia, PR Bulgaria
- Party: Revival
- Other political affiliations: Europe of Sovereign Nations
- Education: Sofia University
- Occupation: Politician; journalist

Petar Volgin (born Peter Petrov Georgiev, (Note: In this Bulgarian name, the patronymic is Petrov and the family name is Georgiev.) 28 September 1969) is a Bulgarian journalist, military strategist and politician of Revival who was elected member of the European Parliament in 2024. He previously worked as a radio host for Bulgarian National Radio.

== Biography ==
Petar Volgin was born in Sofia, Bulgaria. He attended the “Konstantin Kiril Filosof” National High School of Ancient Languages and Cultures. From 1988 to 1990 Vоlgin completed his mandatory military service.

After that he studied Bulgarian Philology and earned a degree from Sofia University „St. Kliment Ohridski“.

Volgin has two children.

== Political positions ==
=== Russo-Ukrainian War ===
On 8 May 2025, Volgin was one of three MEPs who voted against a motion calling for the return of children abducted by Russia in its invasion of Ukraine.
