= Rumen Radev =

Prime Minister of Bulgaria since 2026

Major General Rumen Radev
- Румен Радев
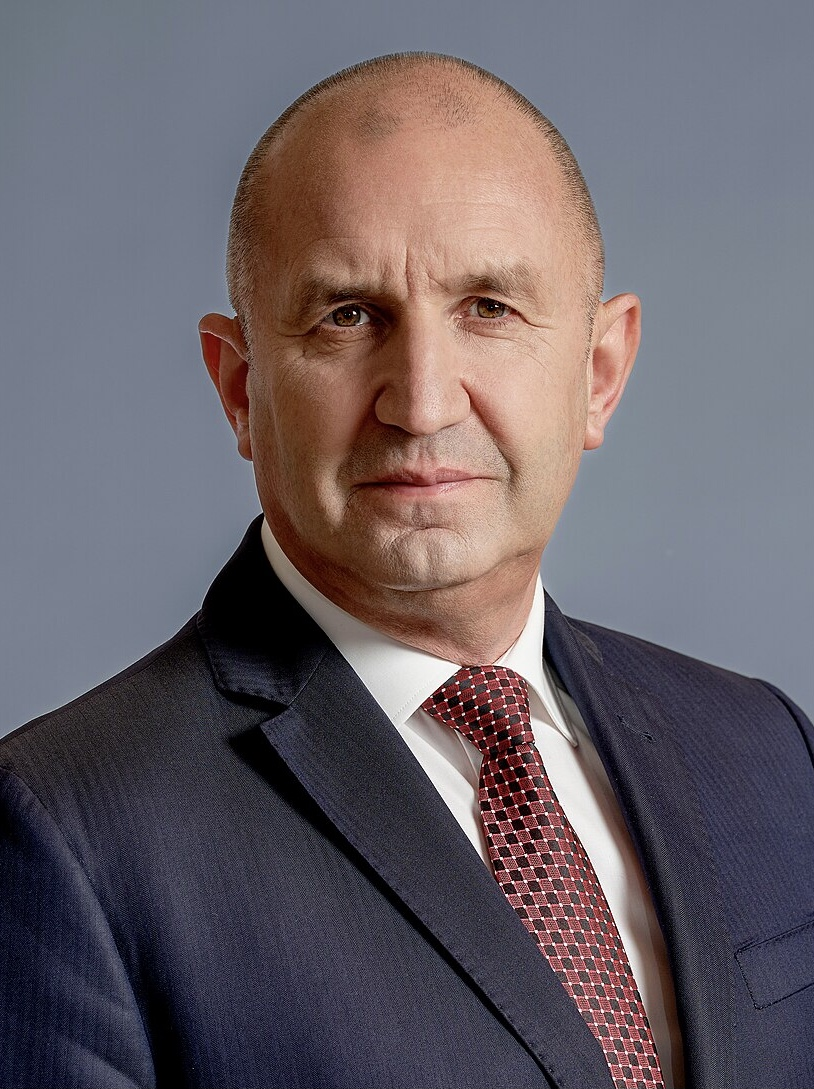
- Official portrait, 2026

Prime Minister of Bulgaria
- Incumbent
- Assumed office 8 May 2026
- President: Iliana Iotova
- Deputy: Galab Donev; Aleksandur Pulev; Atanas Pekanov; Ivo Hristov
- Preceded by: Andrey Gyurov (caretaker)

President of Bulgaria
- In office 22 January 2017 – 23 January 2026
- Prime Minister: See list: Boyko Borisov; Ognyan Gerdzhikov; Boyko Borisov; Stefan Yanev; Kiril Petkov; Galab Donev; Nikolai Denkov; Dimitar Glavchev (caretaker); Rosen Zhelyazkov
- Vice President: Iliana Iotova
- Preceded by: Rosen Plevneliev
- Succeeded by: Iliana Iotova

Leader of Progressive Bulgaria
- Incumbent
- Assumed office 2 March 2026
- Preceded by: Party established

Personal details
- Born: Rumen Georgiev Radev; 18 June 1963 (age 63) Dimitrovgrad, PR Bulgaria
- Party: Progressive Bulgaria (since 2026)
- Other political affiliations: Communist (1985–1990); Independent (1990–2026)
- Spouses: Ginka (m. 1996; div. 2014); Desislava Gencheva (m. 2016)
- Children: 2
- Education: Bulgarian Air Force University; Rakovski Military Academy; Air University

Military service
- Allegiance: PR Bulgaria (until 1990); Bulgaria (from 1990)
- Branch/service: Bulgarian Air Force
- Years of service: 1987–2017
- Rank: Major general

Rumen Georgiev Radev (Note: Bulgarian: Румен Георгиев Радев, pronounced [ˈrumɛn ˈradɛf]. In this Bulgarian name, the patronymic is Georgiev and the family name is Radev.) (born 18 June 1963) is a Bulgarian politician and former Bulgarian Air Force officer who is the prime minister of Bulgaria. He previously served as president of Bulgaria from 2017 until his resignation in 2026.

Born in Dimitrovgrad, Radev served as commander of the Bulgarian Air Force before joining politics, holding the rank of major general. He won the 2016 Bulgarian presidential election as an independent candidate supported by the Bulgarian Socialist Party (BSP), defeating GERB candidate Tsetska Tsacheva in the runoff. The first term of Radev's presidency often saw him in conflict with then prime minister Boyko Borisov of GERB. He secured a second term in the 2021 Bulgarian general election, with 66% of the vote in the runoff.

During his second term, Radev presided over the five-year Bulgarian political crisis. Following his resignation in January 2026, he established the Progressive Bulgaria (PB) party to contest the 2026 Bulgarian parliamentary election. PB went on to receive 44.6% of the vote and an absolute majority of seats, effectively ending the political crisis. This made Radev the first person in Bulgaria's history to serve as both President and Prime Minister.

== Early life and education ==
Radev was born on 18 June 1963 in Dimitrovgrad during the period of the People's Republic of Bulgaria. His family is from Slavyanovo in the Haskovo region. In 1982, he graduated from the Mathematical School in Haskovo with a gold medal. Radev joined the Bulgarian Communist Party (BKP) in the 1980s. He later stated that his primary reason for joining was to fly in a supersonic jet, adding that he was not ashamed of his past. He left the party in 1990, when a newly enacted law forbade members of the country's armed forces from being members of political parties. He had not been a member of any political parties until he founded BPB in 2026. His candidacy in the 2016 election was supported by an independent initiative committee affiliated with the BSP rather than a formal nomination by any party.

Radev graduated from the Georgi Benkovski Bulgarian Air Force University in 1987 as the top graduate. In 1992, he graduated from the Squadron Officer School of the United States Air Force at Maxwell Air Force Base. From 1994 to 1996, he studied at the Rakovski Defence and Staff College, where he was also the top graduate. He holds a Doctor of Military Sciences degree in the field of improvement of tactical training of flight crews and simulation of air combat. In 2003, he graduated from Air War College or Air University at Maxwell AFB with a Master of Strategic Studies with honors.

== Presidency ==
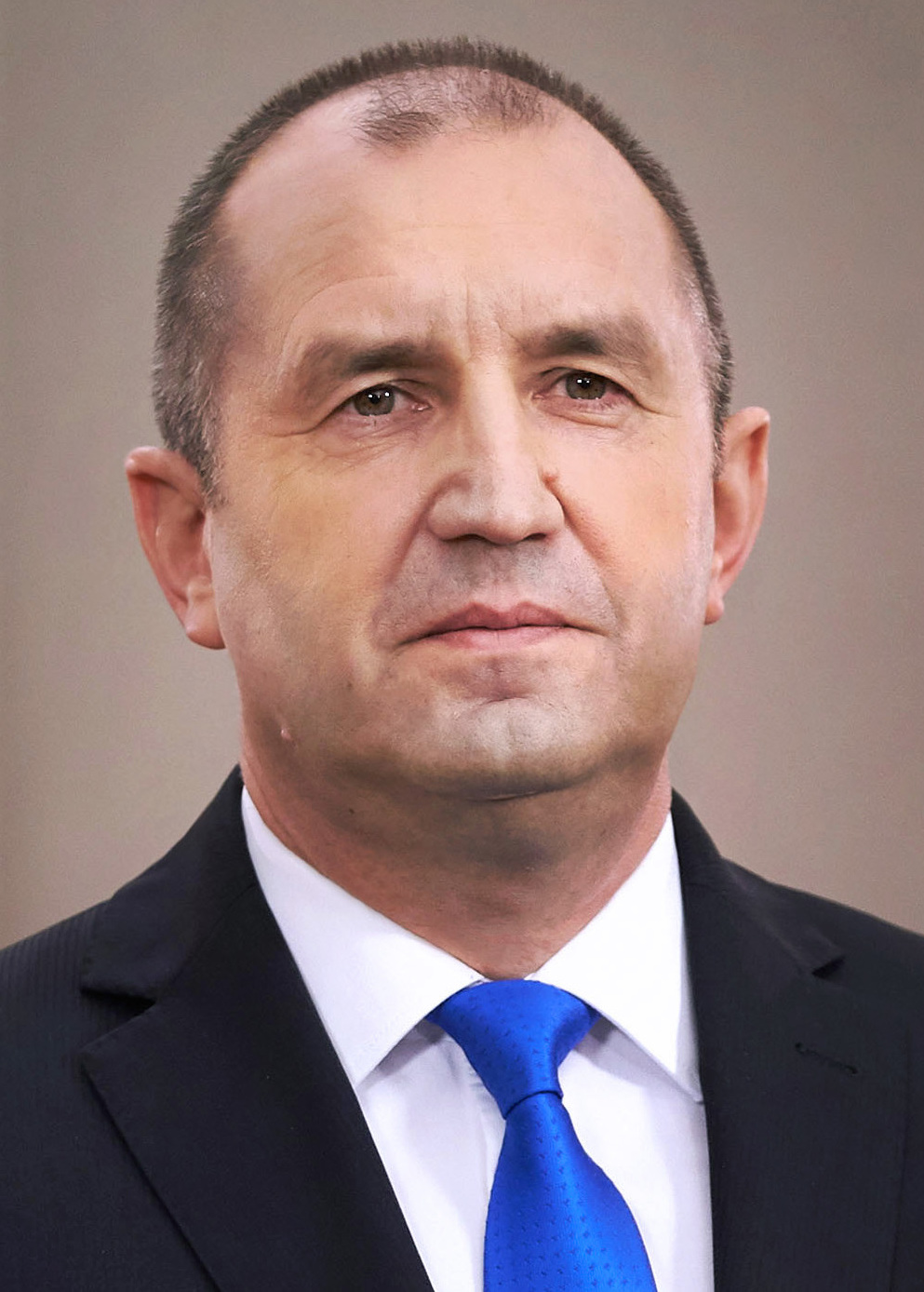
Official presidential portrait, 2018

In August 2016, the BSP and Alternative for Bulgarian Revival (ABR), two opposition parties, officially nominated Radev as a candidate for the 2016 Bulgarian presidential election. In November 2016, the ABR withdrew its presidential nomination of Radev, favouring the election of Ivaylo Kalfin. In the first round of the election on 6 November, Radev came first with 25.44% of the vote. He faced GERB candidate Tsetska Tsacheva in the runoff on 13 November. He defeated her, winning 59.37% of the popular vote.

Since his election into office, Radev frequently criticised Bulgarian prime minister Boyko Borisov, whom Radev viewed as permitting corruption through a "reckless leadership style", as well as attempting to strangle his political opposition. This led Radev to frequently veto legislative proposals submitted by GERB (Borisov's party) to the Bulgarian parliament (the National Assembly), issuing a total of 19 vetoes in the first two and a half years of his presidency. Borisov accused Radev of "sabotaging the government's work", as well as supporting the opposition BSP during campaign periods. In his 2019 New Year's address, Radev stated that he believed that the third Borisov government had failed in addressing corruption, placed the country in economic stagnation with price increases and low wages, undermined the fairness of elections, and retreated from law and justice.

Radev enjoyed positive approval ratings for the vast majority of his presidency. Having been elected with around 60% of the vote in 2016, he managed to keep that figure as his approval rating through to 2018. His approval then rose to 67% by May 2018, before falling to around 56% by autumn 2019; however, even after this fall in his popularity, he was still considered the most popular and approved of Bulgarian politician, as well as one of the only two Bulgarian politicians (the other being Maya Manolova) with a higher percentage of approval than disapproval. By April 2020, Radev's approval ratings stood at about 49%.

On 1 February 2021, Radev officially announced that he and Iliana Iotova would run for a second term. The 2021 Bulgarian presidential election was held on 14 November. Prior to the election, several parties declared support for Radev, including There is Such a People (ITN), We Continue the Change (PP), and BSP for Bulgaria (BSPzB). Radev and Iotova received 1,322,385 votes in the first round, 49.42% of the vote. This led to a second round run-off with the GERB-supported candidate Anastas Gerdzhikov, who got 22.83% of the vote in the first round. Radev won in the run-off, with 66.7% of the vote, starting his second term as president. Radev began his second term with an approval rating of 58.5%, according to a Gallup poll. Subsequently, Radev declined in popularity in opinion polls, reaching its lowest point of 33% in an Alpha Research poll in June 2023. Radev's approval recovered throughout 2024 and 2025, averaging around 40% before his resignation in January 2026.

== Prime Minister ==
On 18 February 2026, President Iliana Iotova appointed a caretaker government led by Prime Minister Andrey Gyurov and set a parliamentary election to be held on 19 April 2026. Gyurov's government asked the EU to help fight off election interference from Russia through social media and propaganda websites. Radev responded by saying this was a plan to force an election annulment if his party were to win, as had happened in the 2024 Romanian presidential election.

In March 2026, Radev founded Progressive Bulgaria (PB), a populist and centre-left party and electoral coalition, promising significant changes and anti-corruption measures. Radev described his political project as a "powerful political alternative" to return Bulgarians' trust in their state, with "clear rules for everyone". Radev had supported the anti-corruption protests, and also promised to end the "oligarchic governance model". At campaign rallies, he vowed to "remove the corrupt, oligarchic model of governance from political power." In the 2026 Bulgarian parliamentary election, PB obtained a landslide victory, with 43.9% of the vote and an absolute majority of seats, which would put an end to the five-year political crisis.

Rumen Radev was officially sworn in as Prime Minister on 8 May 2026, after receiving the first governing mandate on 7 May.

== Political positions ==
=== Domestic policies ===
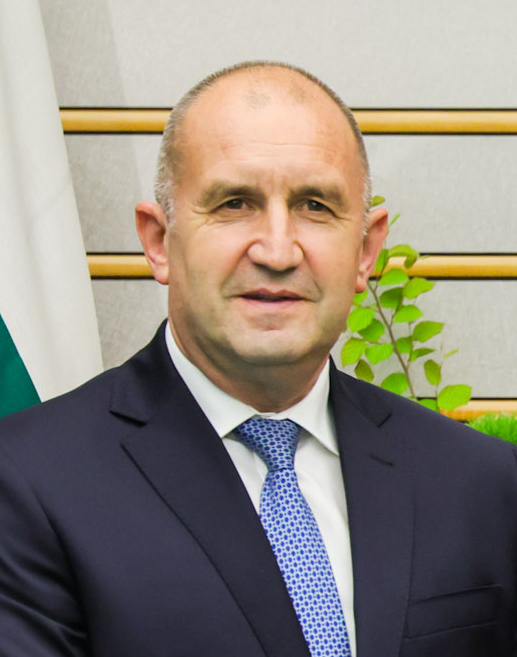
Radev in 2025

Radev has been described as centre-left, populist, and a moderate nationalist. Frankfurter Allgemeine Zeitung said that "almost nothing is known about his intentions, especially in the area of financial and fiscal policy." Bulgarian political expert Dimitar Bechev told Politico that the biggest question is "what a future coalition will look like" and that Radev has to make a choice on the rule of law, deciding whether to align with anti-corruption reformists or to defend vested interests. Radev ran in the 2026 parliamentary election on an anti-corruption platform. The New York Times said analysts noted that Radev would have to clarify some of his positions as he would be making executive decisions for the first time.

=== Foreign policies ===
Al Jazeera English reported that Radev's stance on foreign policy had drawn attention in Europe, leading to a "pro-Russian" label as he objected to a defence pact concluded between Bulgaria and Ukraine in March and had called for the resumption of Russian imports to Europe despite EU sanctions on Russian oil. It added that some had branded Radev a Eurosceptic because he criticised aspects of EU policy, including reliance on renewable energy and Bulgaria's adoption of the euro, saying in a campaign rally: "The coalition-makers introduced the euro in Bulgaria without asking you. And now, when you pay your bills, always remember which politicians promised you that you would be in the 'club of the rich'." The New York Times also reported that Radev's positioning on Russia had been a balancing act to draw support from voters on all sides, and that he would have to clarify some of his positions once in power. The BBC framed Radev as a "pragmatic, somewhat pro-Russian leader, who has criticised EU sanctions, and called for constructive dialogue with the Kremlin." The Guardian described Radev as being favorable towards Russia, adding that EU diplomats had said they did not expect Radev to seek to take over Orbán's role as the EU's chief disrupter.

Ruslan Stefanov, an analyst at the Centre for the Study of Diplomacy, described Radev as a politician of "considerable strategic ambivalence toward Russia" who has "tried to cater to extreme Eurosceptic, and typically also pro-Russian, voter groups." Emilia Zankina of Temple University Rome agreed, saying: "There is a great concern that he may try to steer the country away from its pro-European line." An article published by Novinite argued against a binary interpretation, claiming that Radev, like Bulgaria itself, exists in the gray zone between the East and the West, comparing him to Péter Magyar rather than Orbán. Maria Simeonova of the Sofia bureau of the ECFR analysed Radev's Eurosceptic comments as being primarily towards Bulgarians, stating: "His criticism, particularly regarding financial and military support for Ukraine or sanctions against Russia, will be aimed primarily at the domestic audience." Renew Europe politicians, such as Valérie Hayer and Nikola Minchev, branded the elections as a risk of another trojan horse in the EU.

The Atlantic Council warned that a Radev-led government could "replace Hungary as Putin's proxy inside the EU and NATO", to the detriment of Ukraine, although it assessed that the influence would be "nowhere near that of Viktor Orbán, at least initially." Politico included Radev as one of five "possible successors to Orbán as a key destabilizer in the EU", alongside Robert Fico of Slovakia and Czechia's Andrej Babiš, further adding his pro-Russian stances had drawn a strong rebuke from Ukrainian President Volodymyr Zelenskyy in 2023. Reuters reported that Radev's campaign drew comparisons with Orbán when he talked about improving ties with Moscow and resuming the free flow of Russian oil and gas into Europe. Raidió Teilifís Éireann commented that Radev could find common ground with Fico and Babis on euroscepticism, adding there is a risk he becomes the next EU disruptor after Orbán if he pushes to restore Russian oil imports to Bulgaria. The European Council on Foreign Relations published an analysis arguing that Radev would be closer to Fico than Orbán and that he is ready to criticise the European Commission, especially on the European Green Deal and EU enlargement; however, it predicted that Radev would generally not try to block major EU decisions, such as on Ukraine, in fear of losing EU funds. Other analyses of Radev have compared his actions to Fico rather than Orbán, with MEP Radan Kanev saying that Radev more resembles Fico in "speaking one thing, [and] doing a different one."

== Personal life ==
Radev has two children from his first marriage to Ginka Radeva, which ended in a divorce in 2014: a daughter Darina, born in 2001 and a son Georgi, born in 2003. He later married Desislava Gencheva, who was previously married to the BSP MP Georgi Svilenski. Apart from Bulgarian, Radev is also fluent in Russian, German, and English. Radev's father died on 3 April 2020.

Radev is a member of the Bulgarian Orthodox Church. He stated his support for the efforts of the Bulgarian church to introduce religious education in Bulgarian schools and declared that "the support of the Bulgarian Orthodox Church and the spiritual well-being of the faithful remains the first priority for the State".

== Military career ==
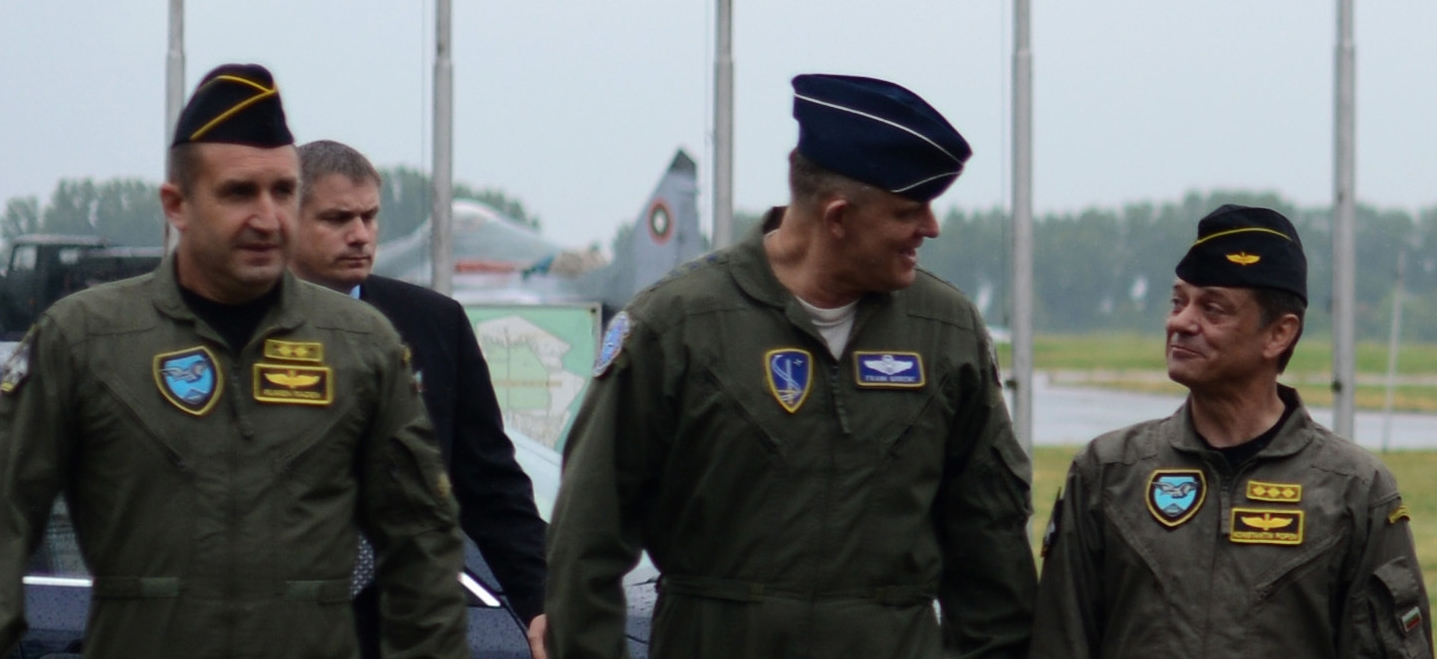
Radev with U.S. Air Force General Frank Gorenc in Bulgaria

- 1987 – 1989: Junior pilot in the 15th Fighter Aviation Regiment – Ravnets
- 1989 – 1992: Unit deputy commander at the 15th Fighter Aviation Regiment – Ravnets
- 1992 – 1997: Unit commander at the 15th Fighter Aviation Regiment – Ravnets
- 1997 – 1999: MiG-29 squadron commander at the Fifth Fighter Airbase – Ravnets
- 1999 – 2000: Deputy commander for flight preparation at the Fifth Fighter Airbase – Ravnets
- 2000: Deputy commander for flight training at the Third Fighter Airbase – Graf Ignatievo
- 2000 – Study of the Air defence of the Republic of Bulgaria – NATO, Brussels
- 2000 – 2002: Chief of Staff of the Third Fighter Airbase – Graf Ignatievo
- 2002 – 2004: Chief of Staff of the Third Fighter Airbase – Graf Ignatievo
- 2004 – 2009: Commander of the Third Fighter Airbase – Graf Ignatievo
- 2009 – 2014: Bulgarian Air Force deputy commander
- 2014 – 2017: Bulgarian Air Force commander

=== Flight information ===
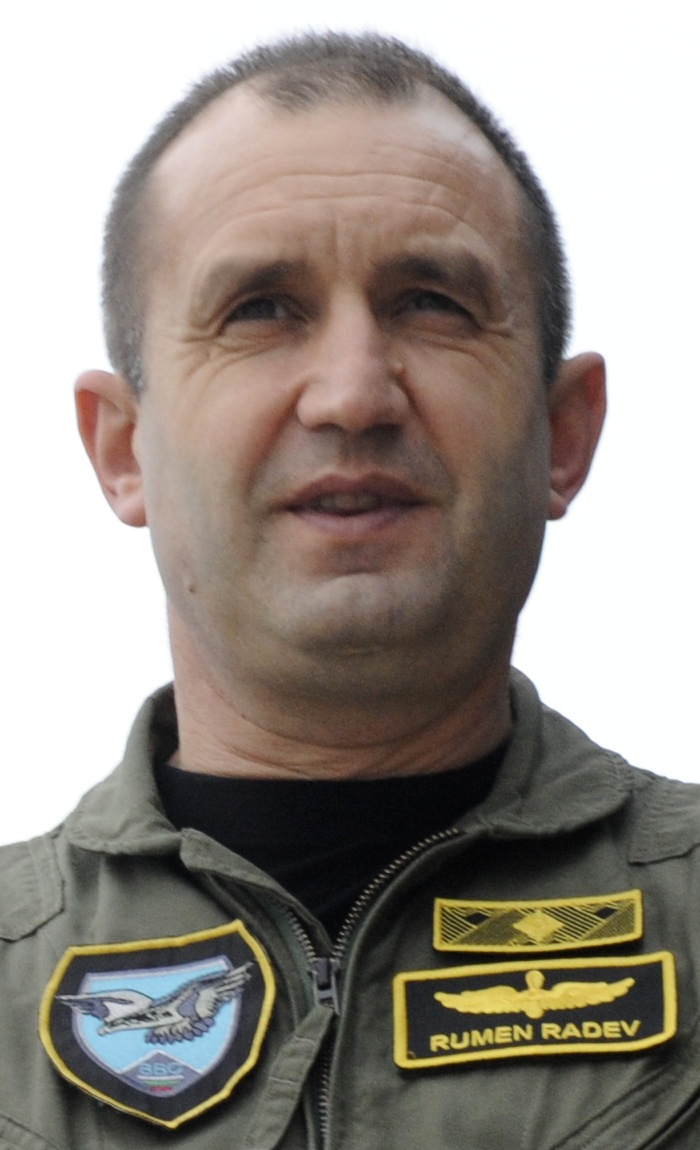
Radev in 2012

- Pilot 1st class.
- Flight experience of L-29, L-39 trainers and MiG-15UTI, MiG-17, MiG-21, MiG-29 fighter jets.
- Familiarization flights of the F-15, F-16, F/A-18 Hornet, Eurofighter Typhoon, SAAB Gripen, Dassault Rafale.
- Flown over 1,400 hours.
- In 2014, he organized aviation show "This We Are!" and personally performed the "Bell" and "Pugachev's Cobra" manoeuvres on a MiG-29.

=== Military ranks ===
- 1987: Lieutenant
- 1989: Senior lieutenant
- 1994: Captain
- 1997: Major
- 1999: Lieutenant colonel
- 2002: Colonel
- 2007: Brigadier general
- 2014: Major general
- 2017: General (Commander-in-Chief)

=== Awards ===
Radev was awarded numerous medals and prizes, including the sign "For loyal service under the flags" – III degree, and Honorary sign of the Ministry of Defence "Saint George" – II degree.

== Honours ==
=== National honours ===
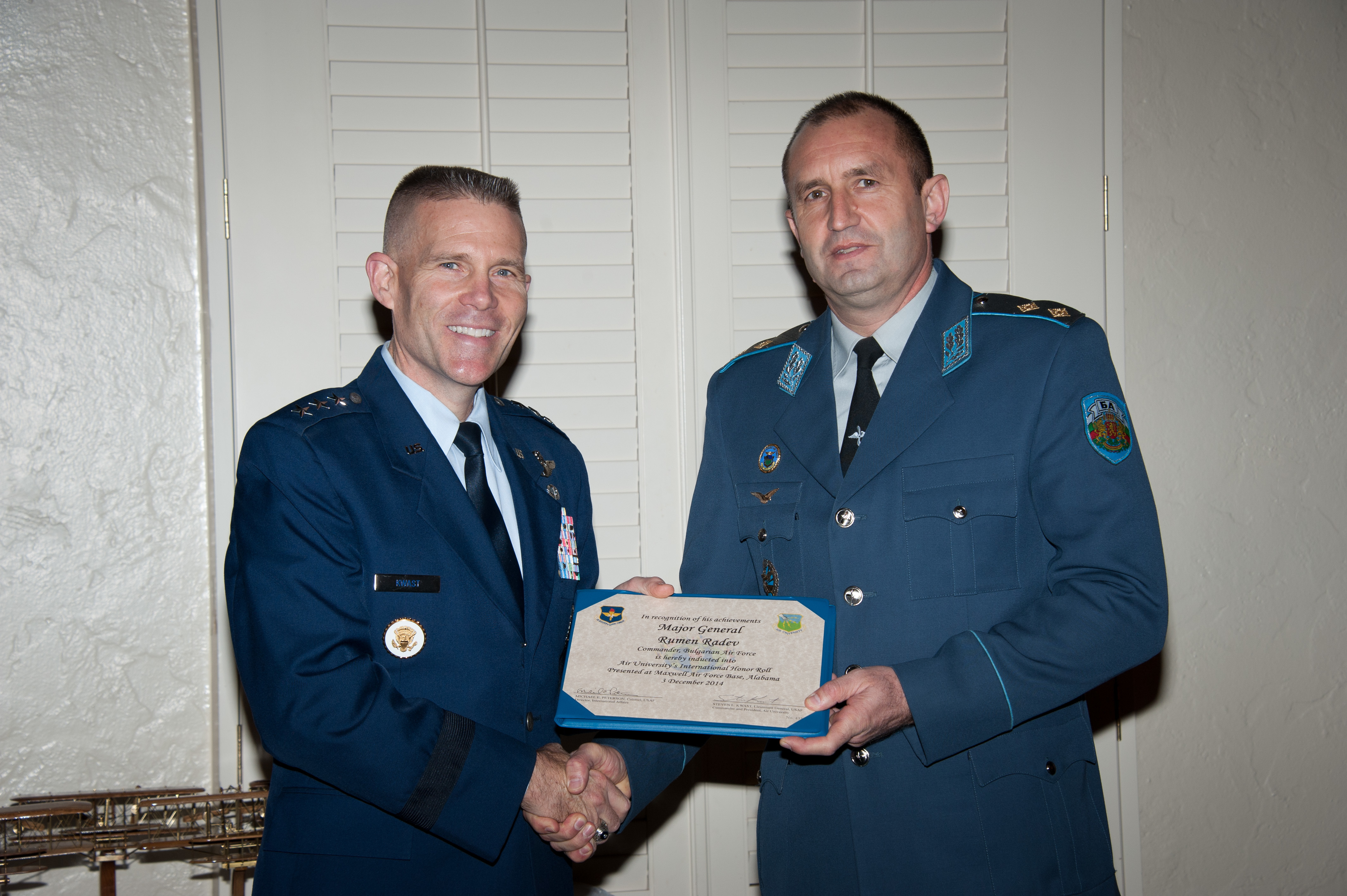
Induction of Radev into the International Honor Roll, 3 December 2014

- Grand Master of the Order of the Balkan Mountains
- Grand Master of the Order of Saints Cyril and Methodius
- Grand Master of the Order of Civil Merit
- Grand Master of the Order of Military Merit
- Grand Master of the Order of the Madara Horseman

=== Foreign honours ===
- Greece:
  - Grand Cross of the Order of the Redeemer (2017)
- Italy:
  - Knight Grand Cross with Collar of the Order of Merit of the Italian Republic (10 April 2024)
- Malta
  - Companions of Honour of the National Order of Merit (5 February 2018)
- Portugal:
  - Grand Cross of the Order of Aviz (30 January 2019)
  - Grand Collar of the Order of Prince Henry (12 April 2022)
- Sovereign Military Order of Malta:
  - Collar of the Order pro Merito Melitensi (13 December 2019)

== Notes ==
Political offices
| Preceded by Rosen Plevneliev | President of Bulgaria; 2017–2026 | Succeeded by Iliana Iotova |
| Preceded by Andrey Gyurov | Prime Minister of Bulgaria; 2026–present | Incumbent |
