= Prime Minister of Bulgaria =

Head of government

Prime Minister of the Republic of Bulgaria
- Министър-председател на Република България
- Coat of arms of Bulgaria

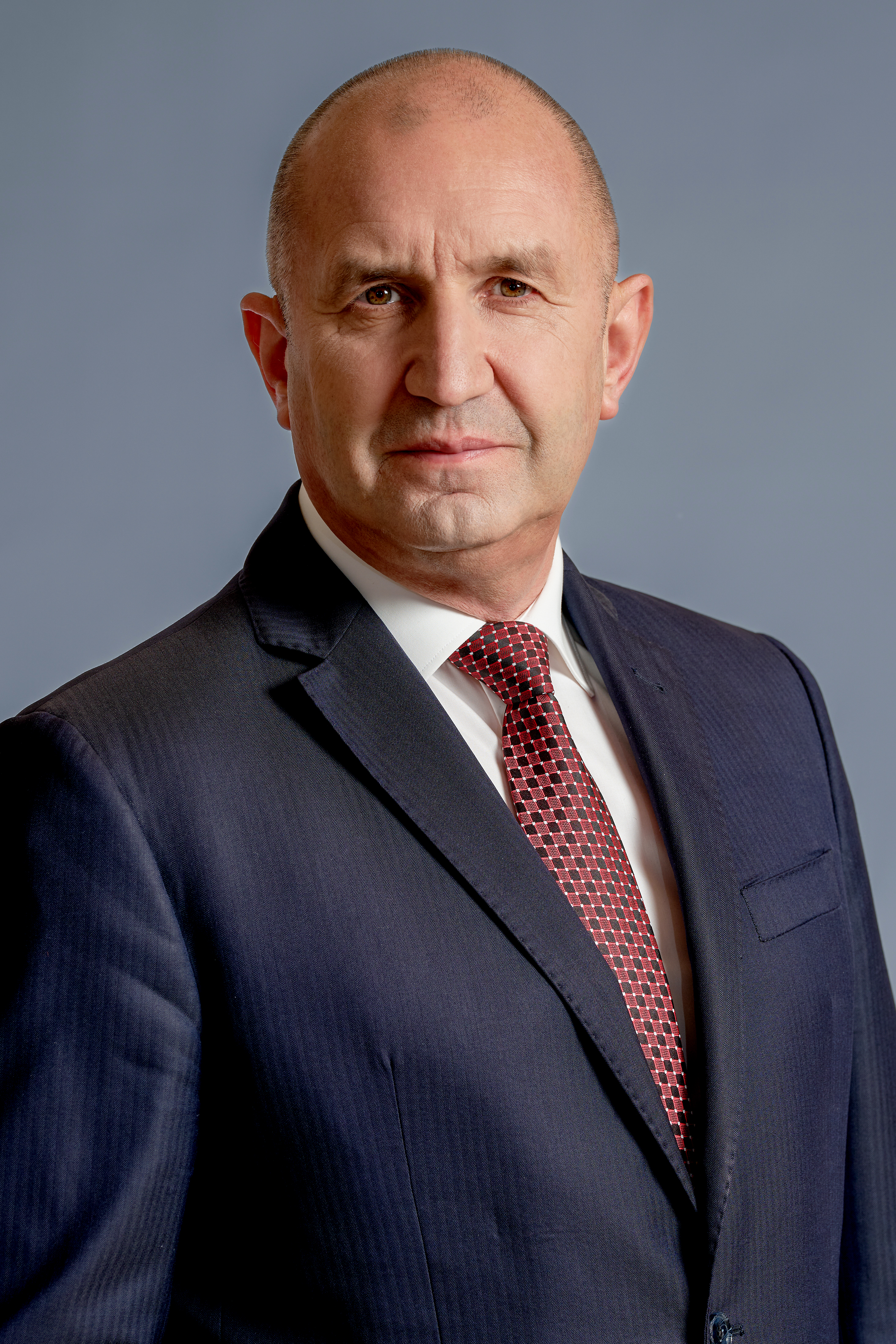
- Incumbent; Rumen Radev since 8 May 2026
- Member of: European Council
- Seat: The Largo, Sofia, Bulgaria
- Appointer: National Assembly of Bulgaria
- Term length: 4 years, renewable
- Formation: 16 April 1879
- First holder: Todor Burmov
- Unofficial names: Premier of Bulgaria
- Deputy: Deputy Prime Minister of Bulgaria
- Salary: €6,238 per month
- Website: government.bg

The prime minister of Bulgaria (Bulgarian: Министър-председател на България) is the head of government of Bulgaria. They are oftentimes the leader of a political coalition in the Bulgarian parliament, known as the National Assembly, and the leader of the cabinet. At times, the prime minister has been appointed by the president of Bulgaria in order to lead a caretaker government. As of May 2026, Rumen Radev is serving as prime minister, following the victory of Progressive Bulgaria in the 2026 election.

== Selection ==
Following a general election, after commencement of the term of the newly-elected National Assembly the president appoints the representative of the party a plurality of seats in the assembly (i.e. the largest party). Factions of the National Assembly are entitled to nominate candidates for prime minister within a period of seven days.

== See also ==
- Government of Bulgaria
- History of Bulgaria
- List of Bulgarian monarchs
- List of heads of government of Bulgaria
- List of heads of state of Bulgaria
- List of presidents of Bulgaria (1990–present)
- Politics of Bulgaria
- President of Bulgaria
