= Andrey Gurov =

Bulgarian politician (born 1975)

- Андрей Гюров
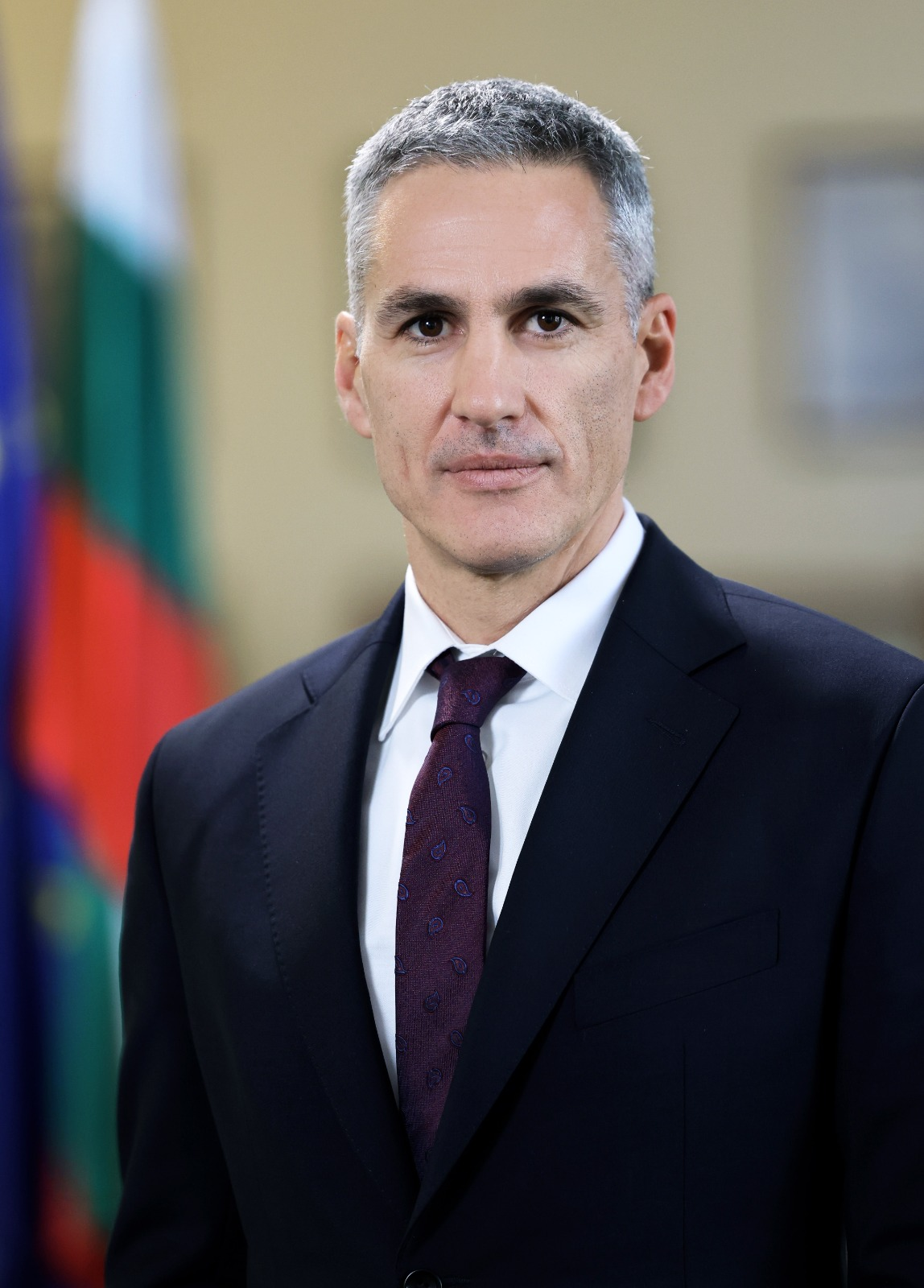
- Official portrait, 2026

Prime Minister of Bulgaria
- Caretaker; 19 February 2026 – 8 May 2026
- President: Iliana Iotova
- Deputy: Andrey Yankulov; Maria Nedina
- Preceded by: Rosen Zhelyazkov
- Succeeded by: Rumen Radev

Deputy Governor of the Bulgarian National Bank
- In office 28 July 2023 – 19 February 2026
- Governor: Dimitar Radev

Member of the National Assembly
- In office 3 December 2021 – 26 July 2023
- Constituency: 1st MMC – Blagoevgrad

Personal details
- Born: Andrey Atanasov Gurov; 31 December 1975 (age 50) Gotse Delchev, PR Bulgaria
- Party: Independent (since 2023)
- Other political affiliations: DaB (2017–2021); PP (2021–2023)
- Children: 2
- Education: Truman State University (BSc); University of Vienna (MSc, PhD)
- Occupation: Politician; economist

Andrey Atanasov Gurov (also Gyurov) (Bulgarian: Андрей Атанасов Гюров, born 31 December 1975) is a Bulgarian economist, professor, and politician. On 19 February 2026, he was appointed caretaker prime minister of the Republic of Bulgaria and served until 8 May. Currently a political independent, he previously served as Deputy Governor of the Bulgarian National Bank from 2023 to 2026 and Member of the National Assembly from 2021 to 2023.

== Biography ==
Gurov has been serving as a deputy governor of the Bulgarian National Bank since 2023. From 2021 to 2023, he was a member of the National Assembly. Prior to becoming Prime Minister, Gyurov worked as a Business Professor in the American University in Bulgaria. On 11 February 2026, President Iliana Iotova nominated Gyurov as caretaker prime minister pending the 2026 Bulgarian parliamentary election. He was formally appointed the following week.

Before assuming office, he served as a Member of Parliament in the 47th, 48th, and 49th National Assemblies, chairman of the parliamentary group of We Continue the Change, and deputy governor of the Bulgarian National Bank. In his political work, he emphasises transparency in governance, the modernisation of the economy, and improving the effectiveness of state institutions.

Gyurov ran for president in the 2026 Bulgarian presidential election. In the first round on 25 October, he finished second with 32% against the incumbent, Iliana Iotova who won a plurality of 35%. He conceded following the second round held on 1 November after receiving 39% to Iotova's 58%.
