= Mayor of Veliko Tarnovo =

- Кмет на Велико Търново
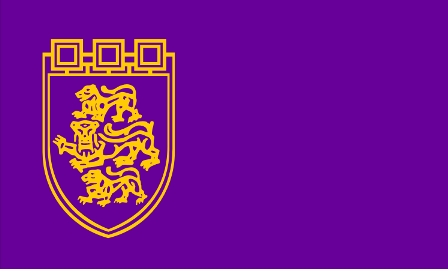
- Flag of Veliko Tarnovo

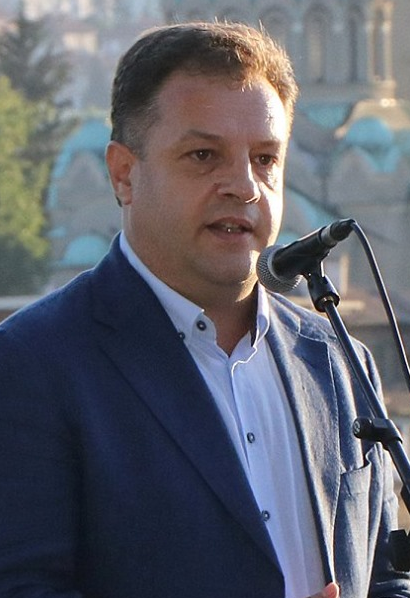
- Incumbent; Daniel Panov since October 23, 2011
- Formation: 1877
- First holder: Georgi Zhivkov
- Salary: 6392 leva
- Website: https://www.veliko-tarnovo.bg/bg/

The mayor of Veliko Tarnovo is the head of Veliko Tarnovo Municipality. The current mayor is Daniel Panov.

== List of mayors of Veliko Tarnovo ==
#	Portrait	Mayor	Starting year of office	Ending year of office
1		Georgi Zhivkov	1877	1878
2		Georgi Popivanov	1879	1880
3		Giorgio Momchev	1880	1881
4		Petar Boyadzhiev	1881	1883
5		Ivan Hadzhibelchev	1883	1884
6		Petar Popdimov	1884	1887
7		Panayot Slavkov	1887	1891
8		Ivan Halachev	1891	1891
9		Stat Hadzhinikolov	1891	1893
(3)		Giorgio Momchev	1894	1899
10		Krastyo Stanchev	1899	1902
11		Evstati Martinov	1902	1902
12		Trifon Kanchev	1902	1903
13		Atanas Hadzidimov	1903	1908
14		Ivan Vitelov	1908	1911
(10)		Krastyo Stanchev	1912	1913
15		Boris Mokrev	1914	1918
(14)		Ivan Vitelov	1919	1920
16		Aleksi Popov	1920	1921
(10)		Krastyo Stanchev	1921	1923
17		Dimitar Yordanov	1923	1925
18		Dimitar Raev	1925	1928
19		Vladimir Daskalov	1928	1932
20		Vladimir Rashev	1932	1933
21		Vasil Davidov	1933	1934
22		Gancho Peev	1934	1935
23		Todor Fartunov	1935	1938
24		Nikola Rusev	1938	1939
(23)		Todor Fartunov	1939	1944
(20)		Vladimir Rashev	1944	1945
25		Nikola Radev	1945	1948
26		Stancho Drumev	1948	1952
27		Stefan Tsonev	1952	1954
28		Kircho Rusanov	1954	1959
29		Haralamen Kutsarov	1959	1965
30		Nedyalko Kalpakchiev	1965	1971
31		Ivan Gendzhov	1971	1979
32		Dragni Dragnev	1979	1981
33		Dimitar Zdravkov	1981	1986
34		Teofil Teofilov	1986	1988
35		Ivan Dimitrov	1988	1990
36		Emanuil Serafimov	1990	1991
37		Boris Krumov	1991	1992
38		Veselin Georgiev	1993	1994
39		Georgi Stefanov	1994	1994
40		Petko Georgiev	1994	1995
(32)		Dragni Dragnev	1995	1999
41		Rumen Rashev	1999	2011
42		Daniel Panov	2011	Incumbent

== See also ==
- List of mayors of Sofia
- List of mayors of Plovdiv
- List of mayors of Pleven
- List of mayors of Varna
