= Chomakov =

Chomakov (Bulgarian: Чомаков) is a surname of Bulgarian origin. Notable people with this surname include:

- George Chomakov (born 1990), Bulgarian footballer
- Georgi Chomakov (born 1959), Bulgarian fencer
- Ivan Chomakov (born 1953), Bulgarian politician
- Krasimir Chomakov (born 1977), Bulgarian footballer
