= Evmolpeya =

Bulgarian girls' choir

The Evmolpeya girls' choir is a municipal choir from Plovdiv, Bulgaria.

== History ==
The Evmolpeya Choir was established in July 2006. Its creator and conductor is the composer Rada Slavinska. The choir was named "Evmolpeya", which translates into "a beautifully singing young girl." The patron of the choir became Ivan Chomakov, the then-mayor of Plovdiv.

Since it was established, the choir has recorded at Radio Plovdiv, Bulgarian National Television and the Belgium National Radio. It has had more than 100 concerts and 12 tours abroad. The 40 singers in the choir are between the ages of 14 and 20 from 16 schools in Plovdiv as well as students from a few universities.

The choir's repertoire consists mainly of four-voice a cappella pieces representing different periods and trends – from the Renaissance to modern days, sacral music as well as folklore songs. The choir has performed songs and parts of cyclic pieces in nine languages: Modern Bulgarian, Church Slavonic, Latin, Russian, German, French, Italian, English, Hebrew and Romani.

== Festivals ==
- XIIth Festival Choral International en Provence - France
- Eurotreff Musik Ulm 2007
- Eurotreff Musik Schwabisch Hall 2008 - Germany
- Xth European Youth Music Festival in Passau - Germany
- VII Bulgariada Arts Festival in Serbia
- XII Festival Choral International de Neuchâtel - Switzerland
- XXVI International Festival "Sarajevo Winter 2010″
