= Presidency of Rumen Radev =

5th presidency of Bulgaria (2017–2026)

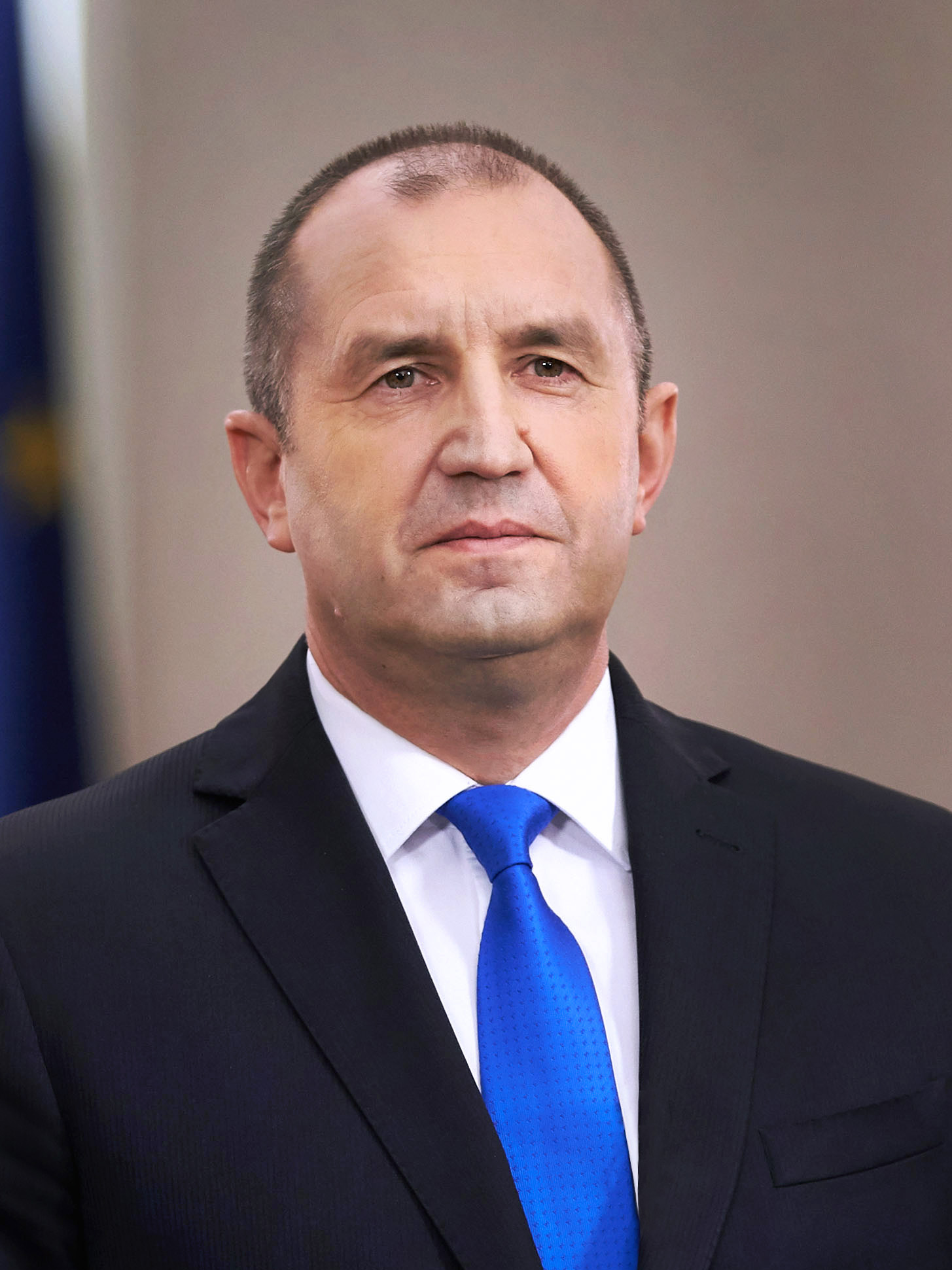
- Official portrait, 2018
- Presidency of Rumen Radev; 22 January 2017 – 23 January 2026
- Vice President: Iliana Iotova
- Party: Independent
- Election: 2016; 2021
- Coat of Arms

Rumen Radev's tenure as the 5th President of Bulgaria began with his first Inauguration on 22 January 2017 and ended when he officially resigned on 23 January 2026, the second to do so in Bulgaria's post-Communist history after Petar Mladenov. Radev, who served as higher commander of the Bulgarian Air Force and held the rank of major general, won the 2016 Bulgarian presidential election as an independent candidate supported by the Bulgarian Socialist Party (BSP). He defeated GERB candidate Tsetska Tsacheva in the second round. During his first term, Radev was often in conflict with Prime Minister Boyko Borisov of GERB.

Radev won a second term in the 2021 Bulgarian general election, with 66% of the vote in the second round. During his second term, Radev presided over the five-year long political crisis in Bulgaria and resigned in January 2026. For the 2026 Bulgarian parliamentary election, the eight election in five years, he formed his own party called Progressive Bulgaria (PB), which achieved a landslide victory and an absolute majority of seats in the National Assembly.

== Election ==
In August 2016, the Bulgarian Socialist Party (BSP) and the Alternative for Bulgarian Revival (ABR), two opposition parties, officially nominated Radev as a candidate for the 2016 Bulgarian presidential election. In November 2016, ABR withdrew its presidential nomination of Radev, favouring the election of Ivaylo Kalfin. In the first round of the election on 6 November, Radev came first with 25.44% of the vote. He faced GERB candidate Tsetska Tsacheva in the runoff on 13 November. He defeated her, winning 59.37% of the popular vote.

On 1 February 2021, Radev officially announced that he and Iliana Iotova would run for a second term. The presidential election took place on 14 November 2021. Prior to the election, several parties declared their support for Radev, including There is Such a People (ITN), We Continue the Change (PP), and BSP for Bulgaria (BSPzB). Radev and Iotova received 1,322,385 votes in the first round, 49.42% of the vote. This led to a second round run-off with the GERB-supported candidate Anastas Gerdzhikov, who got 22.83% of the vote in the first round. Radev won in the run-off, with 66.7% of the vote, starting his second term as president.

== Rivalry with Prime Minister Borisov ==
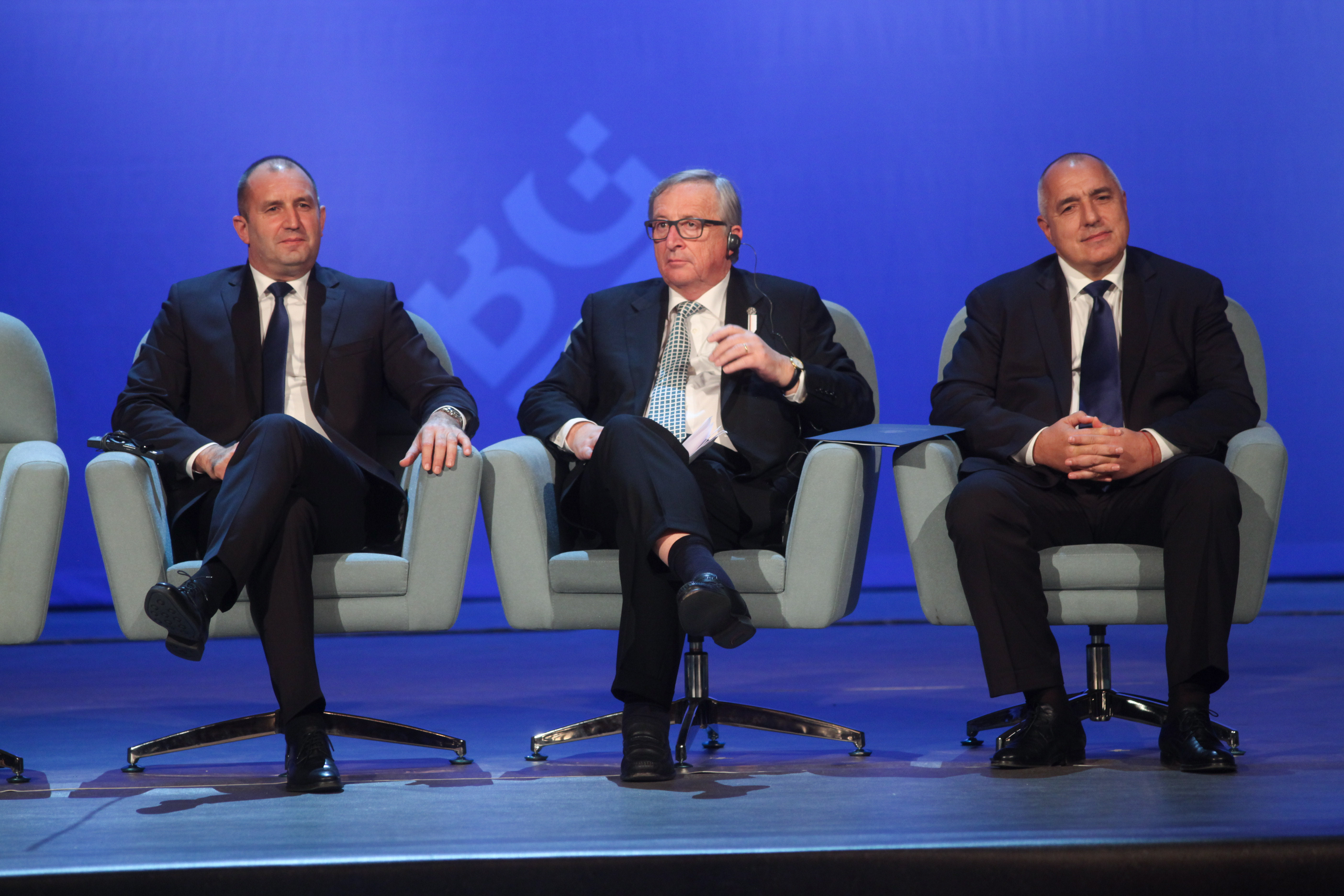
Radev (left) and Prime Minister Boyko Borisov (right)

Since his election into office, Radev frequently criticised Bulgarian prime minister Boyko Borisov, whom Radev viewed as permitting corruption through a "reckless leadership style", as well as attempting to strangle his political opposition. This led Radev to frequently veto legislative proposals submitted by GERB (Borisov's party) to in the Bulgarian parliament (the National Assembly), issuing a total of 19 vetoes in his first two and a half years of his presidency. Borisov accused Radev of "sabotaging the government's work", as well as supporting the opposition Socialist Party during campaign periods. In his 2019 New Year's address, Radev stated that he believed that the third Borisov government had failed in addressing corruption, placed the country in economic stagnation with price increases and low wages, undermined the fairness of elections, and retreated from law and justice.

=== F-16 deal veto ===
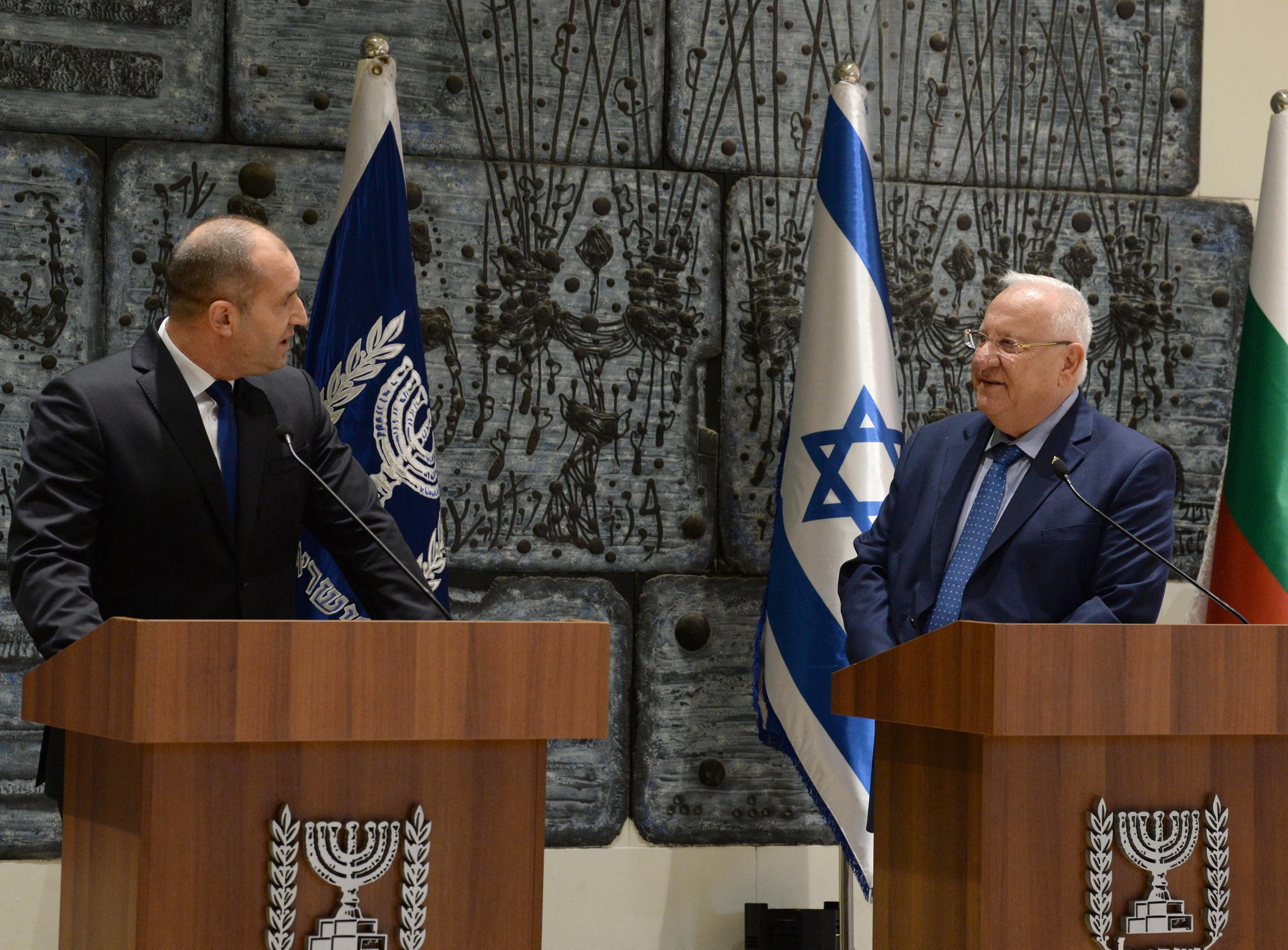
Radev with Israeli president Reuven Rivlin, 20 March 2018

In June 2019, Radev vetoed a major government contract for the acquisition of 16 F-16 Fighting Falcons Block 70 from the U.S. at a cost of around 2bln lev. Radev strongly criticised the deal, accusing the government of authoritarianism and stated that he believed it had agreed to downgrades in the jets' avionics and armament, in order to get a lower purchasing price, which he also deemed too high for what they are worth. The pro-government majority in Bulgaria's national assembly overruled Radev's veto and the deal was nonetheless concluded.

=== Rejection of Geshev as General Prosecutor ===
In November 2019, Radev refused to sign the decree appointing Ivan Geshev to the post of Chief Public Prosecutor of Bulgaria, following the latter's election to the post by Bulgaria's Supreme Judicial Council. He did not officially declare the motive for his refusal in written form, instead deciding to explain it personally to the media. Radev remarked that Geshev was the only candidate for the post and opined that the single-candidate nature of his election was supported by Borisov's government. He expressed the opinion that Geshev's candidacy had been supported only by government-controlled institutions and not by civic ones, which in his eyes led to a lack of public confidence in the institution. The Supreme Judicial Council refused to revise their decision and voted in favour of Geshev a second time, which triggered a constitutional requirement for Radev as president to sign the decree. Stating that he would refuse to violate the constitution, Radev did so following a meeting with Geshev, but called for changes to Bulgaria's constitution.

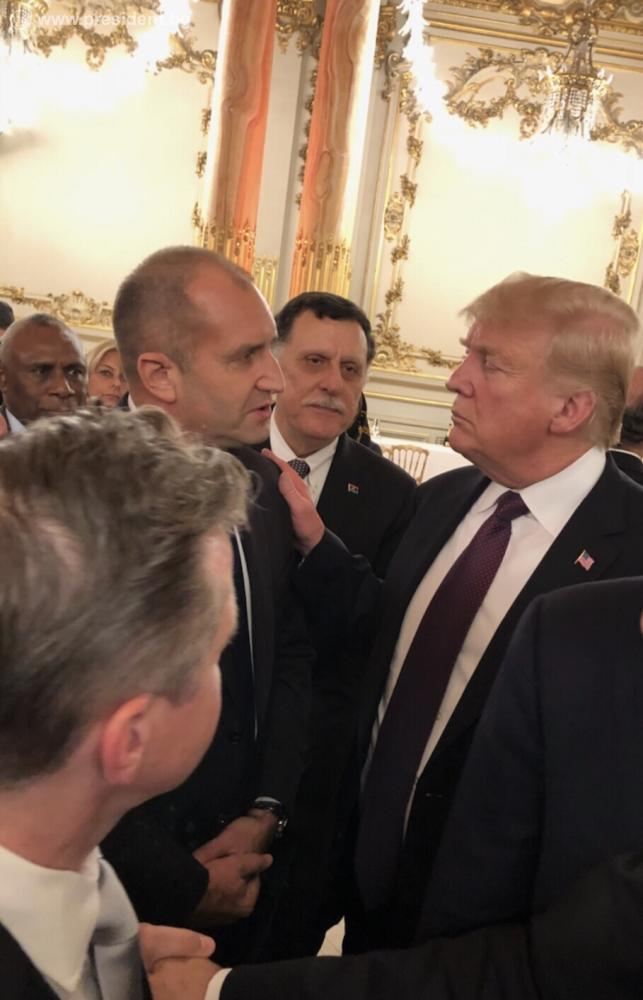
Radev with U.S. president Donald Trump, Paris, 2018

=== Wiretapping scandal ===
The relations between Radev and Geshev quickly soured, as the latter released what he stated was a wiretap of Radev discussing his involvement in alleged criminal activities. Geshev further appealed to the Constitutional Court of Bulgaria to have Radev's legal immunity revoked. The general prosecutor's actions backfired in the eyes of the Bulgarian people and were widely viewed as an attempt to suppress and censor the president – either as 'revenge' for the president's initial veto of Geshev's appointment, or as a preparation for a move to remove Radev from his post as president. In response, Radev accused Geshev's prosecution of being controlled by Borisov's government, whom he accused of using both the prosecution, the secret services and the National Police Service to crush dissent.

Borisov swore that he had not ordered Radev to be wiretapped. In turn, Radev doubled down, noting that the agency responsible for wiretapping in Bulgaria, the State Agency for National Security, was directly responsible to the government and the prime minister. He further questioned the motives as to why it appeared to him as though the general prosecutor "saw crime and corruption in everything, except for the council of ministers".

=== Declaration of no confidence ===
On 4 February 2020, Radev announced that he had formally withdrawn confidence in Borisov's government. He pointed out that there was, in his opinion, a strong crisis in the governance of all levels, a lack of will to reform and fight corruption, and a state of morally-questionable lawlessness in the country. Borisov accused Radev of trying to "take over" the country and stated that his government did not depend on Radev for confidence, adding that he believed the presidency to be a useless post, holding only 'symbolic councils', which he asserted never decided anything.

== COVID-19 pandemic ==
At the start of the COVID-19 pandemic, Radev and Borisov's government initially appeared to thaw their relations for the sake of national unity. Shortly after, however, Radev partially vetoed a law responding to the pandemic. In particular, he objected to a paragraph criminalizing the spread of "fake news" with a fine of up to 10,000 leva. In response, Borisov accused Radev of populism and political opportunism, but nonetheless ordered his parliamentary group to accept the veto. The amended bill still featured a paragraph obligating telecom providers to track and store user data for up to six months and provide it upon request of the authorities, with the stated goal of tracking the movements of quarantined citizens.

Over the coming days, Radev repeatedly criticised the government for its handling of the state of emergency, accusing it of quote mining the World Health Organization for political gain. In reply, Borisov accused Radev of sabotaging the state of emergency, calling him a "dirty old hag of a mother-in-law, the nasty kind" and showing surprise at his willingness to make "inflammatory statements on the day ... his own father had passed away". Radev responded that the conflict was "in Borisov's head", and that he had never called for the state of emergency to be lifted.

In October 2020, Radev attended an investment forum in Estonia, but his visit was cut short after it was revealed that he had been exposed to a COVID-19 positive individual while in Bulgaria. It was alleged that Radev had known this prior to travelling, but the president accused his political opponents of orchestrating a campaign to tarnish his image, displaying a negative PCR test he had obtained prior to the trip.

=== Borisov photo scandal and drone controversy ===
In June 2020, photographs emerged that seemed to show Borisov lying half-naked on a bed, next to a nightstand featuring a handgun and stacks of euro banknotes. Borisov confirmed that the room in the photos was his, but said the gun and money were not, stating that the images could have been manipulated. Borisov accused Radev of flying a drone into his home to take the pictures. He also accused former Ombudswoman Maya Manolova, TV star Slavi Trifonov, and his own former second-in-command Tsvetan Tsvetanov (who had just left and condemned the ruling party) of involvement in a kompromat plot to take photos of him while he was sleeping. Radev condemned the leaks, calling it an "insane" invasion of the prime minister's privacy. He added that he owns a drone, but that the accusation that he used it to take the pictures was part of Borisov's "fantasy and paranoia".

=== Other issues ===
==== Arrest of advisors and anti-government protesters ====
In July 2020, agents of Chief Prosecutor Geshev entered the presidency and detained several of the president's advisors. This, alongside the photo scandal and an incident on a Burgas beach significantly impacted the credibility of Borisov's government, leading to the beginning of large-scale anti-government protests, which Radev openly supported. Radev made a televised address to the nation, in which he demanded that both the entire government and the chief prosecutor resign, openly calling them "mafia".

== Bulgarian political crisis ==
=== April 2021 elections and Yanev government ===
In January 2021, Radev signed the election law, scheduling the next regular Bulgarian elections for April. The elections came after a period of public protests against the Borisov government, and during social restrictions caused by the COVID-19 pandemic. After the elections, Radev decided to not postpone the convocation of the Bulgarian National Assembly, despite the fragmented nature of the newly elected parliament. He also dismissed the possibility of convening a Grand National Assembly, as proposed by Borisov. In his address to the opening session of the National Assembly, Radev expressed hope for a regular cabinet, highlighting the many issues facing Bulgaria: including poverty, the COVID-pandemic and corruption; however, he also called on parties to avoid forming "unprincipled" coalitions. On 19 April, Radev held consultations with all the parliamentary groups. During the consultations, Radev clashed with representatives from GERB, who accused him of expediting the procedure of consultations in order to impede government formations. He, in turn, denied that the Presidential institution would serve as an "architect" of future governments.

After the failure of government formation, Radev announced the formation of a caretaker cabinet on 11 May, headed by his secretary of defense, Stefan Yanev, and scheduled snap legislative elections for 11 July. He announced that the caretaker government's priorities would be to organise fair elections without vote buying, sort out the supply of vaccines and present a Recovery and Development Plan to the European Union. Radev further hailed the cabinet as a government built on "consensus, combing experts from the left, center and right". He also officially dissolved the 45th National Assembly, claiming it would "be remembered for its role in dragging Bulgaria out of authoritarianism and corruption". Radev generally praised the work of the First Yanev caretaker cabinet, especially highlighting the decrease in vote buying and invalid ballots, as well as attempts to reduce corruption within the state, as a success.

There were a number of cabinet changes in the second Yanev government, with the Minister of Economy, Kiril Petkov, and Minister of Finance, Assen Vassilev, leaving to form the party "We Continue the Change". The appointment of the second Yanev caretaker cabinet made Radev the president who oversaw the most caretaker cabinets, as well as the only president to have appointed two consecutive caretaker cabinets. GERB consistently accused Radev of using the caretaker cabinet as a "pre-election headquarters" and of trying to take over the state. During the second Yanev government's term, Radev was accused by some individuals, notably those from the Bulgarian Socialist Party, of implicitly supporting the newly formed electoral coalition led by the former caretaker ministers. The tenure of the Yanev caretaker cabinet ended on 13 December, after the successful formation of a government led by Petkov. During the transfer of power to the new government, Radev praised the caretaker ministers, noting that they "stabilised the country" and "showed that a unity of purpose can be achieved across political lines".

=== Re-election campaign ===
On 1 February 2021, Radev announced he would seek a second term as President, with the incumbent vice president Iliana Iotova as his running mate. Radev declared that his candidacy was aimed at building a "stronger state" and continuing the message of change. Radev's candidacy for president was endorsed by ITN, the BSP, PP, and Stand Up, Bulgaria (ISBG), making Radev the favourite for the upcoming elections. Radev announced on 20 September that he would run as an independent, meaning he was to be nominated by an "initiative committee" of 189 individuals, including important political figures such as BSP MPs Kristian Vigenin and Vesela Lecheva, public activists Nikolay Hadjigenov and Arman Babikyan, as well as ITN MPs Stanislav Balabanov and Filip Stanev.

Radev's re-election campaign faced a challenge after the nominations of the dean of Sofia University, GERB candidate Atanas Gerdjikov, as well as the independent candidacy of the judge Lozan Panov, with the support of Democratic Bulgaria. On 17 October, Radev opened his campaign for president with a hike to the Cherni Vrah. During the campaign, Radev fundraised 730,000 leva, double the amount raised by his closest opponent, Gerdjikov. After the first round, held on 14 November, Radev emerged as the strongest candidate with 49% of the vote, although he still had to face Gerdjikov in the second round. In his statement after the election result, Radev characterised his victory as a "break from corruption, lawlessness, and authoritarianism", and claimed that attempts to "divide and manipulate society" had failed. Radev called on voters to not become apathetic, claiming that they were facing the "organised forces of the status quo" in the second round. Radev's voters came primarily from PP, BSP, and ITN.

After the first round, the two leading candidates agreed to hold a debate. The debate was held on the state broadcaster BNT and lasted 90 minutes. The two mostly agreed on the need for a regular cabinet, continuing the same policy towards North Macedonia, as well as the need for COVID-19 vaccinations. They disagreed regarding refugees, with Radev not supporting asylum provision. Radev, unlike Gerdjikov, defended the caretaker cabinets' handling of the pandemic. The most controversial topic of the debate concerned Bulgaria–Russia relations, with Gerdjikov arguing for continued sanctions, while Radev called the sanctions ineffective. In the second round, held on 21 November, Radev defeated Gerdjikov with 66% of the vote, thus securing a second term in office. The election had the lowest-ever turnout for a second round of a Bulgarian presidential election. Radev began his term in January 2022, and was inaugurated at the presidential "Dondukov-2" Palace.

=== Relations with the Petkov government ===
After the 2021 Bulgarian general election, Radev endorsed the formation of a "government of change". This was treated as an endorsement of a government led by PP, led by Petkov and Vassilev, who held positions in the Radev appointed first Yanev government. On 6 December, Radev gave the first exploratory mandate for government formation to Petkov and Vassilev, asking them to form a "diverse", "non-personalist" cabinet. The mandate was returned to the President as completed on 11 December, with the announcement of the Petkov government. Radev underlined the "responsibility" of the Petkov government to "reform the broken political system and fight corruption, illegality, inequality and the forces of the deep state".

Despite the early support, Radev became increasingly critical of the Petkov government. On 1 February 2022, Radev released a statement to the press in which he criticised the government's approach to North Macedonia for being "too soon". He also criticised Petkov's decision to change the board of directors of the state company Bulgargaz, claiming it was "reminiscent of the style of governance [of] Borissov". Later, on 17 February, Radev quipped that "it is not enough to have good intentions- it is also important to take practical measures" when talking about the government's response to increased inflation, noting that in his view, "the new persons responsible for energy policy, appointed by the new government, have not achieved the necessary results". Despite the increasingly harsh criticism from Radev, Petkov continued to insist that dialogue between the two figures was "constructive".

The conflict between the Prime Minister and the President intensified after the Russian invasion of Ukraine, with Radev opposing the imposition of sanctions and the sending of lethal aid, while Petkov was more open to it. Radev was also critical of attempts by the government to reshuffle Bulgaria's security services. After Petkov was attacked with snowballs during a speech on Mount Shipka for Bulgaria's Liberation day (3 March), Radev dismissed calls to change the leadership of key security services because the incident did not constitute "a breach of security".

In April, the government requested that Radev remove General Emil Tonev as head of the National Security Service, which is responsible for the protection of government officials and government buildings. The reasoning given was that Tonev had transferred video tapes collected by cameras at the entrances of the Ministerial Council to the General Prosecutors office, without informing the prime minister. While Radev criticised the request for video tapes by the General Prosecutors Office, he refused to remove General Emil Tonev from his position, citing the motivation as "surface-level and unreasonable" and accusing the Petkov government of trying to "politicise the security services".

On 27 April, the Russian state company Gazprom announced that it would cease deliveries to Bulgaria, after Bulgaria refused to pay in Rubles. Radev criticised the government, claiming that the government's aggressive foreign policy approach, including state visits to Kyiv, imperilled energy security and led to higher inflation. On 17 June, a proposal was submitted by France which aimed to create a "framework for negotiations" between North Macedonia and Bulgaria, with Bulgaria lifting the veto on accession of North Macedonia to the European Union, in exchange for North Macedonia's government's commitment toward protecting the Bulgarian minority in North Macedonia. President Radev was critical of the French proposal, and criticised the Petkov government for not "taking a clear position on it" and instead "transferring responsibility to the National Assembly". Petkov then criticised Radev for not calling a Consultative Council on National Security to discuss the "French proposal".

Despite his continued criticisms of the government, Radev refrained from commenting on the vote of no confidence against the Petkov government, calling it a "routine moment in a democratic society". Simultaneously, Radev underlined his readiness to form a caretaker cabinet and called on MPs to "refrain from becoming political nomads". After the successful vote of no confidence, Radev began the process of government formation. On 28 July, the BSP leader Korneliya Ninova returned the third mandate incomplete, thus meaning that new elections were to be scheduled. In her statement after the return of the third mandate, Ninova claimed that Radev was "part of the group" that had removed the cabinet from power. Due to the failure of government formation, early elections were called for October, and a caretaker cabinet (the first Donev government) headed by Radev's social policy advisor, Galab Donev was appointed.

=== Donev caretaker cabinet and 48th National Assembly ===
On 2 August, Radev appointed a caretaker cabinet headed by Donev. Radev was criticised by the BSP for the appointment of BSP members in the cabinet, with Ninova insisting that the party would not take responsibility for their actions and that this was an attempt by Radev to meddle in the internal affairs of the party. Ninova went as far as to say that the new government was "revanchist" against BSP. In his official presentation of the caretaker cabinet, Radev outlined its goals as being to rein in "the many crises facing our country" and reduce the possibility of Bulgaria's involvement in an armed conflict. With the appointment of Donev, Radev became the first president in Bulgarian history to appoint 3 caretaker prime ministers in his tenure.

The snap elections, which took place on 3 October, once again produced a fragmented parliament, with no single party being the obvious favourite in terms of government formation. Addressing the newly elected 48th National Assembly on 19 October, Radev expressed hope that it would finally bring the country out of political deadlock and form a regular cabinet, while also cautioning MPs away from entanglement in foreign wars. In the weeks following the gathering of parliament, Radev postponed the handing of the first mandate to GERB—the winning party—citing the fact that he wished to grant more time for negotiations and wished to avoid holding a snap election during winter. Some in the media accused Radev of postponing the government formation process in order to keep the Donev caretaker cabinet in power for a longer period of time.

Radev handed the first mandate for government formation to GERB on 2 December, with GERB nominating neurosurgeon Nikolai Gabrovski, as their prime ministerial candidate. The cabinet failed its investiture vote on 14 December, with Radev seeing the main reason for its failure in the fact that GERB had bet on "peoples amnesia" about their period in government, which had not taken place. He further confirmed that he would only give the second mandate to PP after the New Year.

On 14 December, Radev placed his veto on a controversial new law, which would have amended the electoral code of the country to remove the option to vote using newly installed machine-voting systems. On 2 January 2023, Radev gave the second mandate to PP as the second largest parliamentary group; however, the second mandate was not realised and was returned unfulfilled on 9 January by PP prime ministerial candidate Nikolai Denkov. During the return, Radev advised PP to consider negotiations with GERB in order to form a regular cabinet.

There was much speculation about who would receive the third mandate, with analysts most commonly mentioning the Bulgarian Socialist Party (which had received the third mandate the previous times), Bulgaria, Arise! (a party seen as close to Radev, due to its leader being the former Prime Minister of a caretaker government appointed by Radev) and Democratic Bulgaria (who had been endorsed by PP and GERB). Radev gave the third mandate to BSP on 16 January, a decision which was read by some analysts as being an indicator that Radev wished to force new elections, due to BSP's poor negotiating position, and as part of an appeal to leftists. After the return of the third mandate unfulfilled on 21 January, which made new elections inevitable, Radev described the third mandate as "initially doomed" due to "a lack of will from political parties to govern during a time of crisis".

On 3 February, Radev reappointed Donev as caretaker prime minister, after the Bulgarian Parliament once again failed to form a regular government. In the presentation of the renewed caretaker cabinet, which had the same composition sans the minister of culture, he praised them for "stopping the free fall of the state", reining in inflation and controlling energy prices, while also claiming that "the political parties will try to gain credit for the successes of the caretaker cabinet". Radev set reducing poverty and insuring stable levels of CPI as the two main goals of the reappointed caretaker government. The tenure of Donev's second caretaker cabinet ended on 6 June 2023, with the election of the Denkov cabinet. During the transfer of power, Radev praised the caretaker cabinet for their ability to rein in the various crises afflicting Bulgaria, specifically by lowering fuel prices.

==== Relations with political parties ====
Throughout the period of the Donev caretaker cabinet, Radev often exchanged mutual criticisms with political parties represented in the Parliament, most commonly with PP and DB. During government formation consultations, held in November 2022, Radev attacked DB for their support of sending lethal aid to Ukraine, claiming it was "unreasonable" to send weapons systems before rearmament. On 4 December, PP co-leader Vassilev, accused Radev of "regular meetings" with Borisov, noting the "level of coordination" between the caretaker cabinet and GERB. Vasilev also called Radev the "chief reason" for Bulgaria's non-ascension into the Schengen Area. In response, Radev sharply criticised Vassilev, claiming that this "was not the first time he had lied" and expressed regret about his appointment as caretaker finance minister.

During the election campaign for the 2023 Bulgarian parliamentary election, BSP consistently accused Radev of allegedly meddling in internal party affairs. BSP sent an official complain to the OSCE and PACE alleging illegal meddling by the caretaker government and president in their internal politics, as well as the election campaign after an interview by justice minister Krum Zarkov criticising the party leadership. The PP–DB coalition also accused the president of meddling after Radev called them "the parties of war", referring to their support of sending arms to Ukraine. Radev's statement led key DB figures to call for his impeachment. During his address on 3 March (Bulgaria's Liberation Day), Radev criticised "those who wish to burn Bulgaria in the fires of war" and "who wish to disarm Bulgaria at a time of war, who are ready to abandon our fellow citizens near Vardar, and who wish to turn the Republic into a cheap political theater".

=== 49th National Assembly and Denkov–Gabriel government ===
After the parliamentary elections, Radev announced his decision to convene the new 49th National Assembly on 12 April. During the opening session, Radev gave a speech calling for parties to put aside their differences and engage in dialogue in order to "leave the political crisis" and "defend our European pathway, as well as our future as a democratic society". Shortly after the convocation of the 49th National Assembly, Radev reappointed Plamen Tonchev to a second term as head of the State Agency for National Security. In the following week, Radev held consultations with the parliamentary groups to explore avenues for government formation: during these meetings, the largest party, GERB, expressed a willingness to govern together with PP–DB; however, PP–DB continued to insist that they would not govern with GERB. Following this, he decided to postpone the handing of the first mandate to GERB in order to enable the parliament to pass laws—specifically in relation to the budget, EU Plan for Recovery and Sustainability, as well as Bulgaria's ascension into the Schengen area. During Europe Day celebrations, Radev announced that he would hand GERB the first exploratory mandate on 15 May, with Radev criticising the parliament for not doing enough to pass important laws. On 15 May, Radev gave the first mandate to GERB's prime ministerial candidate, Mariya Gabriel, wishing her luck in forming a government. On 22 May, Gabriel returned the first mandate to President Radev, citing the fact that an agreement was not reached in parliament.

Radev was scheduled to hand the second mandate to Denkov on 29 May. A few days prior, an audio tape was leaked by MP Radostin Vasilev, allegedly from the meeting of the PP National Council during a discussion on governing with GERB. This tape seemed to insinuate that PP leaders had made a deal with Radev to win the 2021 Bulgarian general election, wished to make changes within the security services, which they claimed were controlled by "Radev's people" and suspected that Radev was planning to enter politics in the near future. Radev dismissed these accusations, highlighting that "the security services don't belong to the President, but to Bulgaria as a whole".

When giving the second mandate to Denkov, Radev called on Denkov to return the mandate unfulfilled because it was "discredited" due to the release of the audio tapes. Radev's statement led to the organisation of protests by PP-DB and other organisations outside the presidential building calling for Radev's impeachment due to his alleged breach of his constitutional duties as well as condemning his allegedly pro-Russian views. On 1 June, Radev continued to criticise the proposed Denkov–Gabriel government, declaring that he did not expect "the kiss between Borisov and Petkov to produce anything but disgust, and certainly not trust or development", further claiming that the leaked audiotapes proved the undemocratic intentions of the incoming government.

On 5 June, Denkov returned the second exploratory mandate completed, with Radev promising to submit the appointment of the Denkov government to a vote by the National Assembly within the shortest time frame. The vote of investiture in Denkov's government took place on 6 June, being personally attended by Radev, who when entering the National Assembly told the media he hoped that MPs would vote against the proposed cabinet if they "were not partisan servants", and expressed hope that if elected the "newly elected government will not betray the national interest, just as the leaders of the political parties (PP/DB and GERB) had betrayed the interests of their voters". Upon the successful investiture of the government, Radev demonstratively left the session, saying that the government was "formed with deep compromises to the essence of democracy".

==== Removal of General Prosecutor Ivan Geshev ====
Radev condemned the alleged political assassination of General Prosecutor Ivan Geshev on 1 May as "an attack against Bulgarian institutions". As divisions appeared within the Prosecutors Office, Radev refused to comment. He responded with scepticism to calls by Gabriel for the removal of Geshev, citing the fact that those nominated by GERB in the Supreme Judicial Council had previously voted in favour of Geshev. On 18 May, Radev reiterated his position that Geshev should resign; however, he pointed out that the problems within Bulgaria's judicial system were not the responsibility of a single person.

Some media outlets accused Radev of attempting to "save" Geshev by not signing a newly passed law which would have lowered the number of votes necessary in order to remove the General Prosecutor a few days before the vote on Geshev's future was to take place; however, he was quick to sign into law the removal of Geshev from his position as general prosecutor on 15 June, only a few days after the vote had passed within the SJC. A few days after Geshev's removal, and the speedy emplacement of his deputy, Borislav Serafov as acting general prosecutor, Radev claimed that the political parties "planned to put their own man as general prosecutor" and called on civil society to "keep tracking and exercise control over the activities of the General Prosecutor".

==== Denkov–Gabriel government ====
Radev criticised the Denkov Government throughout its tenure. On 23 June, Radev criticised them for not being cautious enough to avoid Bulgarian "involvement" in the Russo-Ukrainian War, and called on the Bulgarian government to "focus more on our own army, rather than foreign ones". Radev further stated that he, as the nominal commander-in-chief of the Bulgarian Armed Forces should have greater involvement in determining the foreign policy direction of the country.

In July 2023, Radev criticized the Denkov government for giving lethal aid to Ukraine, and wanting Bulgaria to join the Eurozone "at any cost" instead of "when it is ready". Protests then started in Sofia which called for Radev's resignation over his stance on Ukraine. Radev then called for the government to "focus on issues within Bulgaria". He also advocated for greater pressure on North Macedonia to amend its constitution to include Bulgarians and taking a clear position on the updated Myrotvorets list which included Bulgarian politicians. He condemned plans by the Denkov government to end the concession of the refinery Rosenets to the Russian state-owned oil company Lukoil, calling the plans "either in service of corporate appetites or crisis-PR".

On 26 July, with the release of proposed constitutional amendments by the PP-DB parliamentary group, Radev released a statement describing the proposed amendments as "legally illiterate and politically untenable"—specifically criticising the "attack on local government institutions and the presidency", as well as the change of the "National Holiday", from 3 March (Liberation Day) to 24 May (Day of Enlightenment and the National Language). After the joint project for constitutional changes was submitted by the PP-DB, DPS, GERB-SDS parliamentary groups, Radev called it "part of an offensive against democracy".

Radev, commenting the assassination of Bulgarian businessman Aleksei Petrov, accused the government of "trying to use its failures in order to gain more power" and dismissed the idea of holding a "Consultative Council of National Security" due to a lack of faith in the integrity of figures in the Denkov government. On 24 August, Radev received a request from the Minister of Interior, Kalin Stoyanov, to remove the secretary of the minister of interior, Petar Todorov. Radev refused to sign the dismissal, stating that the motivations for Todorov's dismissal were "contradicted by evidence from the Ministry of Interior statistics" and "part of a wide-scale purge within the state institutions". On 30 August, Radev submitted an official rejection of Stoyanov's request to remove Todorov; however, Todorov resigned hours later.

On 27 August, Radev responded to statements made by PP co-leader Kiril Petkov who demanded that Borisov "choose whether he wishes to work with the President or to reform the security services", by highlighting the role of both parties in supporting the present government, and further lamenting that "in this situation, logic seems to disappear more and more often". On 1 September, Radev said Borisov's admission that assassinated businessman Petrov had a role in the formation of the Denkov government was "an admission that the country is governed by the 'deep state'".

On 11 September, following PP-DB's announcement of their intent to remove most security service heads in the country, Radev criticised it, saying that "reforming the security services doesn't just mean placing 'your people' in charge." After the revelation that at least three priests of the Russian Orthodox Church in Bulgaria were working as spies, he defended the work of DANS against criticism by PP-DB and refused to allow for the removal of its chief. On 18 October, during the Day of Bulgarian Aviation, Radev accused the government of ruling with authoritarian intentions and denied accusations that he had "declared war" on the government, instead saying they had started a campaign against him. He further accused the government of trying to secretly sell the oil refinery in Burgas.

After the local elections, Radev refused to dismiss the chief of DANS, who the government said had authorised the release of misleading report made by one of his deputies, which had undermined trust in the electoral system. He criticised the government's decision to impose the tax on Gazprom, pointing out that it led to a negative reaction by Hungary's government. Radev condemned the planned removal of the Monument to the Soviet Army, Sofia, calling it an "aggressive offensive against statehood, history and memory".

Before leaving for Kosovo on 22 December, Radev discussed the constitutional amendments passed by the National Assembly, criticing PP-DB for "only recently claiming Borisov and Peevski are involved in corruption and in the 'deep state' but now they govern together. Rape the constitution together", further saying that the government must ensure a clear time frame for Bulgaria's entry into the Schengen Area be provided before 2024. During his New Years Address, Radev lamented that Bulgaria being a "free European democracy" was impossible in an atmosphere of "war with national symbols and historical memory", "political hypocrisy" and "tolerance for corruption". While inspecting the Bulgarian Armed Forces on 6 January, commenting the upcoming rotation of the Prime Ministers position, Radev characterised the incumbent ministers as "pawns". In February, Radev continued to criticise the government, but made clear that he would not impede the upcoming rotation and would "strictly follow the Constitution".

===== Mount Shipka speech and the 3 March movement =====
On Mount Shipka on 19 August, Radev accused the political class of attempting to "erase" Bulgarian historical memory, due to "their false belief that to be European we must reject the fact we are Bulgarians". He further accused the government of authoritarianism due to the proposed constitutional changes. He announced that "3 March is the red line of our patience"—in reference to the government's plans to change the National Holiday from the 3 March (the Liberation of Bulgaria) to 24 May—the day of the Slavonic alphabet.

Political analysts at the time speculated that this meant Radev would openly participate in Bulgarian electoral politics. Such speculation intensified after the creation of an initiative committee to hold a referendum for the preservation of Third of March as the national holiday, which was joined by a number of people close to the president, including presidential adviser Alexander Marinov; however, organisers of the committee, including MEP Petar Vitanov, insisted that the initiative committee did not involve the president and was not intended as the basis for a future political party.

On 29 January 2024, when commenting on the prospects of him potentially founding a political party, Radev said that "the rise of an alternative political force" was inevitable due to the failings of the government and political parties. Later, Radev took a step to cool rumours about his involvement in politics, denying his involvement with the "Third of March" movement and stating that if he supported a party he would make that support public. On 3 March, Radev thanked those who had gathered and creditted them with "defeating" the government effort to change the date of the National Holiday.

===== Veto and court challenges of laws =====
Оn 14 June, Radev vetoed the "Law on the Judicial Power", which would have separated the investigative branch from the competency of the General Prosecutor, citing the fact that such a system had existed prior to 2009 and was replaced in order to adhere to EU norms. The veto was supported by the parliament, with the law being therefore withdrawn. On 11 July, Radev submitted an official complaint to the Constitutional Court wherein he disputed the appointment of Goritsa Grancharova as acting chief of the Chamber of Audit, citing to the fact that the previous chief Tsvetkov's dismissal by the National Assembly had been deemed illegal by the Constitutional Court in a previous ruling. The Constitutional Court ruled in Radev's favour, invalidating all acts made by the Chamber of Audit during her time as acting chief.

On 1 August, Radev put a veto on the amendments to the "Law on Judicial Powers", motivating his veto by claiming that the new changes would be overly disruptive to the newly created process of investigating the General Prosecutor. The veto was overturned by the National Assembly. On 4 August, Radev submitted a challenge to the legality of the decision to cease the concession of the oil refinery at Rosenets before the Constitutional Court, citing irregularities within the law and a lack of clarity about how the refinery was to be managed.

In October, Radev challenged two more laws in the Constitutional Court. He challenged the Law on the Preservation of Agricultural Land, due to its enabling of expanded construction of renewable energy sources on high productivity agricultural land. He also challenged the decision of the government to impose a tax on gas passing through the Gazprom pipelines located in Bulgaria, on the grounds it violated the right to private property. Radev's decision to challenge the tax led to criticism from Denkov, and his finance minister, Vassilev, who accused him of serving Russian interests by challenging the tax. Radev also vetoed the newly passed "Energy Law", citing the fact that the liberalization of the energy market would negatively impact Bulgarian lower-income consumers. The veto ended up being overturned by the parliament on 10 November.

On 4 December, Radev vetoed the transfer of 100 Bulgarian APCs to Ukraine, saying they could be used by the Bulgarian Ministry of Interior in cases of natural emergencies and to protect the border with Turkey. The veto was overturned by the parliament on 8 December. During the work on the budget for 2024, Radev threatened to veto it due to it incurring new debts and potentially involving the alleged sale of public land. Upon the passing of the constitutional changes proposed by the government on 20 December, Radev promised to challenge them before the Constitutional Court, claiming that the changes would "undermine the democracy, legality and sovereignty of the state".

On 8 January 2024, Radev officially submitted his challenge of the Constitutional Amendments to the Constitutional Court, which focused on three major areas within the new constitutional changes: the alleged changes within the balance of powers which could only be authorised by a Grand National Assembly, alleged contradictions with other sections of the constitution, the alleged non-compliance with the time-frame for the debate of constitutional amendments set by the Constitution. On 23 January, Radev submitted his challenge of the election of two new Justice by the National Assembly to fill the vacancies within the Constitutional Court, claiming that their election violated the constitution by not following the proper procedures and not being transparent enough. Radev went on to not attend the official swearing in ceremony of the elected Constitutional Judges, which may disrupt their selection to the Constitutional Court since the Constitution states they must place their oath in the presence of the president.

On 12 February, Radev vetoed an amendments to the Punishment-Procedural Code, which would have revived the abolished Supreme Judicial Council (SJC) for an indeterminate period of time, due to the fact that this amendment contradicted the approved amendments to the Constitution, which had liquidated the institution and split it into two separate councils (one for judges, one for prosecutors). The veto ended up being upheld by the Bulgarian National Assembly. On 29 April, he vetoed the "Investment Promotion Act" due to it decreasing environmental protections and reducing the time limits of Environmental Impact Assessments.

===== Resignation of the Denkov government and government formation process =====
On 5 March, Prime Minister Denkov resigned as part of the previously agreed governance deal with GERB, which foresaw the minister of foreign affairs, Mariya Gabriel assuming the position. Following this, Radev assumed his constitutional duty within government formations by first summoning the Parliamentary Groups for consultations. During the consultation, the representatives of GERB-SDS, headed by Gabriel, informed Radev about the ongoing negotiations with their governing partners, PP-DB, and requested a time extension for continued negotiations. PP-DB were asked by Radev about their relationship with GERB-SDS, with PP-DB confirming their intention to form a government together with GERB. DPS, the third largest Parliamentary Group, confirmed they would continue to give support to the government; however, DPS did not exclude the possibility of creating a new governing majority within the National Assembly. All the other parties involved in the consultations (Revival, BSP and ITN) expressed their support for early elections.

Following the consultations, Radev scheduled the handing of the first mandate to the largest Parliamentary Group, GERB-SDS, for 15 March; however, the ceremony ended up being postponed to 18 March due to the death of Neophyte of Bulgaria, the Patriarch of the Bulgarian Orthodox Church, and the subsequent period of mourning. On 18 March, Radev officially gave the first mandate to Gabriel, in the presence of a mixed delegation of GERB and PP-DB MPs, as well as Denkov. Despite having seven days for negotiations, Gabriel decided to return the first mandate completed to Radev on 19 March. Gabriel officially presented her cabinet to Radev, which was similar in composition to the outgoing Denkov government; however, it had a number of changes, specifically the Defense Minister and Energy Minister. Shortly thereafter, Radev published a decree proposing the candidacy of Gabriel to the National Assembly.

Subsequently, a number of the proposed-ministers in the proposed Gabriel government, announced that they did not consent to their participation in the proposed government, leading PP-DB to call for Radev to not present the Gabriel government for a vote due to its potential unconstitutionality. Radev refused on the grounds that according to the Constitution the president only presents a nominee for prime minister, and is not responsible for the composition of the Cabinet. On 24 March, Gabriel announced the end of government negotiations with PP-DB and the withdrawal of her candidacy as a candidate for PM. Subsequently, on the 25th, the National Assembly approved Gabriel's withdrawal as candidate for prime minister, thus voiding the first mandate and leading Radev to hand the second mandate to PP-DB. Radev gave the second mandate to PP-DB on 27 March, with PP-DB instantly returning the second mandate incomplete. On 28 March, Radev announced that he had selected the smallest Parliamentary Group, ITN, to receive the third mandate, with ITN similarly instantly returning it to the President. With the return of the third mandate, the constitutionally mandated government-formation process was ended, leading to early legislative elections on 9 June.

=== Glavchev caretaker government ===
==== Caretaker cabinet formation ====
Due to the Constitutional Amendments adopted by the 49th National Assembly in December 2023, the possibilities of the president in terms of appointing a caretaker government were limited. For one, the potential caretaker Prime Minister was restricted to a list of 10 people: the chairman of the outgoing National Assembly; the governor of the Bulgarian National Bank and their deputies; the head of the Chamber of Audit and their deputies; finally, the Ombudsman and their deputy. Additionally, the rules for the appointment of caretaker ministers remained unclear, with the president and the caretaker Prime Minister seemingly sharing responsibility for their appointment after consultations with the Parliamentary Groups. The Constitutional Amendments seemingly also left unclear the possibility of the potential caretaker prime ministers to refuse their appointment, as well as the potential possibility of a refusal to appoint a caretaker government by the president. Commenting the possibility of appointing a caretaker cabinet on 1 March, Radev promised to go by the "phone book", implying that his selection of a caretaker Prime Minister would follow the significance which the positions of the potential caretaker-Prime Minister candidates have within the constitutional structure of Bulgaria.

Upon the return of the second mandate incomplete, thus making early election a de facto inevitability, Radev lamented that the constitutional amendments supported by PP-DB had created the grounds for a "constitutional crisis" during the appointment of the caretaker cabinet, the nature of which he would "further explain" during consultations with the Parliamentary Groups. Radev also commented on the resignation of one of the potential caretaker-Prime Minister candidates, the deputy Ombudsman, by highlighting her nature as the only "non-political" candidate and suggesting the possibility of her resignation being forced. On 28 March, with the return of the third mandate, Radev officially announced that he would begin the process of the formation of a caretaker government by inviting prospective caretaker prime ministers for consultations. The meetings included the chairman of the NA, Rosen Zhelyazkov, as well as the head of the BNB, Dimitar Radev, and head of the Chamber of Audits, Dimitar Glavchev.

Prior to the aforementioned meetings, Borisov expressed his opposition to the appointment of either Zhelyazkov or Glavchev to the position of caretaker Prime Minister due to their explicit connections to GERB, which Borisov argued could be used in the campaign period in order to "slander" GERB. Dimitar Radev similarly expressed reservations about serving as caretaker Prime Minister due to the non-political status of the BNB. The incumbent Ombudsman, Diana Kovacheva, similarly refused the position of caretaker Prime Minister due to her intention to become a judge at the European Court of Human Rights. On 29 March, after consultations with all candidates for caretaker Prime Minister, Radev announced that he had selected Glavchev for the role.

==== Relations with the Glavchev cabinet ====
On 30 March, Radev officially invited Glavchev to form a caretaker government, noting that he was the only individual to not refuse the position, thus averting a constitutional crisis. Radev called on Glavchev to form a politically neutral cabinet and to present the cabinet before the President within a 7-day time frame, in order to insure the early elections could be scheduled together with the European Elections. During the formation and presentation of the Glavchev cabinet, Radev often reiterated that he did not have responsibility for the government's actions. He further criticised some of the choices made by Glavchev in his Cabinet composition, such as the appointment of Kalin Stoyanov as caretaker minister of interior. Only a week after the appointment of the cabinet, Glavchev requested the removal of two ministers: the minister of foreign affairs, Stefan Dimitrov, and the minister of foods and agriculture, Kiril Vutev, both of whom he accused of not properly fulfilling their roles. In their place, he proposed GERB MP, Daniel Mitov, for Minister of Foreign Affairs, and head of the State Fund "Agriculture", Georgi Tahov, for Minister of Agriculture. Radev officially commented the proposed changes four days after their announcement, making it clear that he did not support the appointment of Mitov due to his connections to GERB, and asking Glavchev to meet with him in order to discuss the changes further.

Following Glavchev's proposal for himself personally to undertake the Ministry of Foreign Affairs, Radev urged him to explore alternative options, although he signalled his readiness to implement the decision if Glavchev insisted on it. On 22 April, Radev was expected to meet Glavchev in order to discuss the cabinet reshuffle; however, Glavchev did not attend, instead submitting an official request to be appointed as caretaker minister of foreign affairs along with his post as caretaker prime minister. Later that day, Radev signed the cabinet changes, thus enabling the change of two caretaker ministers. Radev severely criticised the decision of the Glavchev Government to approve the construction of a private children's hospital in Sofia.

During the spring session of the NATO Parliamentary Assembly, which was held in Bulgaria, Radev was notably absent from the country, instead attending state visit Hungary and Switzerland, during which he made a number of statements accusing the NATO policy towards the Russian invasion of Ukraine of promoting increased escalation. His statements led to concern within the Glavchev caretaker government, that Radev was not fit to lead the Bulgarian delegation during the upcoming NATO summit in July, which caused a dispute between the two institutions.

On 5 June, Glavchev announced his intention for the parliament to decide who should lead the Bulgarian delegation, unless a regular government had been formed; however, the parliament on 21 June proved unable to find a consensus on the matter, leading to the cabinet's eventual decision that both Glavchev and Radev would be present at the summit. It was further decided that Radev was to represent the delegation based on the position prepared by the cabinet. On 27 June, Radev announced that he would not represent the Bulgarian delegation citing deep disagreements with the position of the cabinet, specifically as pertains to the matter of Ukraine. On 9 June, Radev voted in the June 2024 Bulgarian parliamentary election, while voting he restored rumours about the possibility of leading a political party by noting that if the political crisis continues the appearance of a "political alternative" is inevitable.

=== 50th National Assembly and early elections ===
Radev convened the 50th National Assembly of Bulgaria for 19 June. Unlike in previous National Assemblies, wherein the president usually made a speech during the opening session, this time Radev did not deliver a speech. He justified his decision by stating that he had already outlined his main theses in previous speeches. On 24 June, Radev began consultations with the parliamentary parties for the first mandate. During the consultations, it became clear that GERB planned to nominate a minority government, a move that was only supported by DPS.

Rudev gave the first mandate to GERB's prime ministerial candidate, Zhelyazkov, on 1 July, who decided to immediately complete it and submit his cabinet for a vote in the National Assembly. Zhelyazkov's cabinet was then defeated in the Assembly, thus voiding the mandate. Radev was set to present the second mandate to DPS; however, an internal conflict within the party between Ahmed Dogan and Delyan Peevski led to a split in its parliamentary group, thus making PP-DB the second largest group. On 15 July, Radev held a meeting with the representatives of PP-DB to determine when they wished to receive the second mandate. PP-DB asked the President to postpone the second mandate for three months, so that PP-DB could pass key anti-corruption laws which they believed were necessary to prove that a stable majority existed. Radev did not explicitly oppose this, but said that the primary task of PP-DB was to find a governing majority, rather than legislative action. Following the failure of PP-DB's negotiations, Radev delivered the second mandate to them, which was subsequently returned unfulfilled. He gave the third mandate to ITN, justifying the decision by citing their consistent positions. The mandate was again returned incomplete, thus meaning new legislative elections were inevitable.

==== Grancharova proposed cabinet crisis and second Glavchev government ====
As no government had been formed, a caretaker cabinet had to be appointed. As such, Radev held a consultation with the Parliamentary Groups. During this, he revealed that there were candidates other than the incumbent Glavchev available for the position of caretaker Prime Minister. On 9 August, Radev revealed that he had selected Goritsa Grancharova, deputy head of the Chamber of Audit, as the caretaker prime minister-designate. He justified his decision by underlining her non-partisan character, as well as allegations that Glavchev may be under undue political influence. Radev gave Grancharova ten days to form her cabinet, in order to hold snap legislative elections by 20 October.

On 19 August, Grancharova officially presented her caretaker cabinet before Radev. Radev did not appoint the proposed cabinet, due to the controversial nomination of Kalin Stoyanov for Minister of the Interior, and gave Grancharova three hours to nominate another person to avert a constitutional crisis. When she did not, Radev reopened nominations to all parties for the position of caretaker prime minister; there was debate as to whether the decision was constitutional.

On 20 August, Radev held consultations with alternative caretaker prime minister candidates, and following these Glavchev was selected for the position. During the presentation of the caretaker government mandate, Radev pointed out to Glavchev that allegations of political influence over him had emerged in previous months and hoped that the presentation of the new caretaker government would disprove those. He further noted that fighting vote buying should be a key policy priority, implying that a change within the Ministry of Interior was necessary. On 26 August, Glavchev presented the composition of his second caretaker government to Radev, replacing Kalin Stoyanov with Atanas Ilkov as Minister of the Interior. Radev approved this cabinet.

==== Conflict with Delyan Peevski and the "Graf Ignatievo" aviation disaster ====
The personal conflict between Radev and Peevski intensified in the run-up and following the October 2024 Bulgarian parliamentary election. On 7 September, Radev made a statement which (while not explicitly implicating Peevski) implied that his role in the state must be diminished and characterised him as an existential threat to Bulgaria. The conflict intensified following an aviation disaster at Graf Ignatievo Air Base, which killed two pilots. Peevski alleged the President was responsible for their deaths due to his appointment of the Bulgarian Air Force leadership. Radev vehemently denied this, and accused Peevski of trying to benefit from the event.

On 11 November, during the opening session of the 51st National Assembly, Peevski held a protest against Radev outside the Presidential residence, calling him a "pseudo-president". During government consultations for the formation of a government, he pointedly did not invite the DPS – New Beginning parliamentary group. The unprecedented decision led to debate about its constitutionality. Radev justified his decision by stating that DPS-NN had "self-excluded" itself from the government formation process by stating its support for new elections and further stated that the decision was fully in line with the constitution.

==== October parliamentary elections ====
During the investiture of the Glavchev caretaker cabinet, Radev placed fighting vote-buying and other electoral law violations as its primary priority, in order to restore trust in the electoral process. Speaking to the media on 9 October, Radev suggested that state institutions (including the caretaker cabinet) were not doing enough to prevent vote-buying, implying that a double-standard existent in treating offenders depending on political affiliation. He cast his ballot on 27 October, and claimed election integrity must be ensured, to guarantee the legitimacy of the next parliament and potential future governments.

Following the publication of provisional results, Radev made a statement in which he commented on the alleged mass vote-buying allegations and urged the caretaker cabinet to publish data about the extent of vote buying and coerced voting, as well as the potential role of local state institutions in the practice. Speaking on 5 November, Radev claimed that if he had appointed the caretaker government, the fairness of the elections would not be in dispute. Commenting the convocation of the 51st National Assembly on 11 November, he stated that due to the doubts about the legitimacy of the preceding vote it was the parliament's own responsibility to prove its independence.

=== 51st National Assembly and Zhelyazkov government ===
The beginning of government formation procedures following the election of the 51st National Assembly was impeded by its inability to elect a Speaker, with the parliament electing Natalia Kiselova as speaker only on 6 December (almost a month following its convocation). Between 11 and 12 December, Radev held consultations with representatives of all the Parliamentary Groups, except DPS-NN. During the consultations, while most parties except GERB announced that they would not negotiate with DPS-NN; BSP-OL, APS, ITN, and DB did not deny that possibility.

Following the beginning of official negotiations between GERB and DB on December, 16th, as part of broader government formation negotiations further involving the BSP and ITN, Radev announced that the first mandate would be given to GERB after the New Year. Despite the seeming breakdown of government negotiations, Radev promised to grant an extended time period for the parliamentary parties before giving the first mandate to GERB. Ultimately, a government deal was agreed prior to the delivery of the first mandate to Zhelyazkov, on 15 January. During the delivery of the first mandate, Zhelyazkov returned it fulfilled, with Radev subsequently submitting his candidacy and the composition of his cabinet to the National Assembly. On 16 January, the National Assembly voted to approve the Zhelyazkov government, with it subsequently being sworn in. In February, Radev summoned a Consultative Council for National Security in relation to reports of increased youth drug abuse. After the council, held on 18 February, it was agreed that amendments would be made to existing laws in order to increase the liability for the sale of illegal narcotics to minors and further prevent minors from having access to narcotic substances.

Following speculation about the potential deployment of European forces in Ukraine (as part of a peace-keeping mission or deterrence force), Radev called on the National Assembly to assure Bulgarian citizens that Bulgaria would not participate in such a deployment. A National Assembly declaration to a similar effect was subsequently approved. On 17 February, prior to the annual commemoration of the Execution of Vasil Levski on 19 February, Radev signed a decree naming Sofia Airport in his honour. Commenting the disturbances caused by the protests of Revival against the introduction of the Euro, Radev condemned the use of violence by certain protesters, and lamented that more must be done by the government in order to reduce public tensions surrounding the topic.

Speaking at the Liberation Day ceremony, he called for unity and expressed hope for an end of hostilities in the Russo-Ukrainian War. Radev criticised state institutions in Bulgaria following an address by the Chairwoman of the Constitutional Court, Pavlina Panova, in which she stated that the work of the court when considering the case of the legitimacy of the preceding October elections was being obstructed by other state institutions. He further called for the re-introduction of machine voting in order to restore trust in the electoral system. After the Constitutional Court ruled in favour of a partial annulment of the preceding election results, Radev denied allegations by Borisov that he had orchestrated the ruling. Speaking after the swearing-on of newly elected Constitutional Court justice, Orlin Kolev, Radev posited that the future of the Zhelyazkov Government depended on Borisov and Peevski, and criticised the incumbent government for not doing enough to pursue anti-corruption reforms.

Speaking prior to the first vote of no confidence faced by the Zhelyazkov Government, Radev claimed that the incumbent government had attempted to avoid blame for controversial issues (such as traffic accidents and the deal with Turkish energy company Botash) by discrediting the Radev-appointed caretaker cabinets. He intensified his criticism of the government prior to the end of its first 100 days in office, wherein he stated that he believed that the incumbent government represented a continuation of the model of governance used by Boyko Borisov, as well as alleged corrupt practices associated with it. A further conflict developed between Radev and Borisov, after the arrival of new F-16 fighter jets, which had been purchased by the third Borisov government. Borisov claimed, following reports that the first jet which had arrived suffered from technical deficiencies, that the deficiencies were the fault of head of the air force, Nikolay Rusev, who he claimed was personally responsible to President Radev. In turn, Radev stated that the purchase of the F-16 jets was undertaken by the Borisov government and further called on the government to take responsibility for the maintenance of the aircraft.

==== Euro referendum attempt and criticism ====
On 9 May, Radev announced his intent to submit a referendum about Bulgaria's ascension to the Eurozone in 2026 to the National Assembly. Radev was criticised by his opposition, who branded his referendum request as unconstitutional; however, the pro-Russian Revival party praised Radev's decision, with far-right parties Velichie and MECh also voicing support.

Prime Minister Zhelyazkov firmly defended Bulgaria's accession to the eurozone, emphasizing that Bulgaria had already committed to it in its EU Accession Agreement, and that the final decision had been made by the National Assembly. Other senior figures, such as GERB leader Boyko Borisov and Nikolai Denkov from PP-DB, called on the National Assembly to reject Radev's proposal, characterizing it as a controversial political stunt. Legal expert Borislav Tsekov also opposed the proposal, stressing that while Radev had the right to submit it, the National Assembly has the final say. Further, he pointed out that the matter had already been ruled against by the Constitutional Court, and that Bulgaria's readiness to join the eurozone is ultimately determined by the European Commission.

On 12 May, Radev officially submitted his referendum request to the National Assembly, citing a lack of societal consensus and alleged government inaction as his reasoning. Nataliya Kiselova, the chairwoman of the National Assembly, rejected the proposal as unconstitutional. Radev saw this decision as illegal and challenged it in the Constitutional Court; he clarified that the referendum did not question the adoption of the Euro in general, but rather Bulgaria's readiness to for it in 2026. The Constitutional Court dismissed all but one of Radev's challenges; they did agree to consider whether Kiselova had the capacity to reject the proposed referendum.

Radev endorsed anti-euro protests organised by Revival, claiming that its introduction would increase inflation, while admitting the potential for increased foreign investment. On 27 June, Radev claimed that prices had "increased significantly" following announcements of Bulgaria's impending adoption of the Euro, and accused the government of being unable to prevent inflation. After Bulgaria officially joined the Eurozone on 8 July, Radev claimed that it would be used as an excuse for GERB to remain in power for longer.

==== Conflict with the Zhelyazkov government ====
In June 2025, Radev approved the removal of head of SANS, Plamen Tonchev, who had been elected as Head of the Commission for the Review of Documents related to the Bulgarian State Security. The removal of Tonchev led to a long-term conflict between the Zhelyazkov government and Radev, due to Zhelyazkov's accusations that Radev was obstructing key appointments within the security and diplomatic services. On 13 June, Borisov accused Radev of specifically obstructing the appointment of the Secretary to the Ministry of Interior, which Radev denied, claiming that no candidacy was submitted by the government. On 21 June, Radev confirmed that the procedure for the selection of the next Secretary had commenced, involving both himself and representatives of the government. On 2 July, Minister of Interior, Daniel Mitov, accused Radev of obstructing the appointment of the position.

A sign of the distrust between the two institutions was indicated by Radev's exclusion from Bulgaria's delegation at the 2025 NATO summit, which was instead led by Zhelyazkov. On 20 June, Borisov accused Radev of harming the evacuation of Bulgarians from the Middle East due to his frequent state visits, which Radev called a lie, before accusing Borisov of corrupt practices during his time in office. After corruption scandals in Sofia which led to the arrest of multiple Municipal Mayors related to PP, he called for greater investigations into corruption, specifically related to figures in the government. He condemned the arrest of Varna mayor Blagomir Kotsev.

In July, an investigation was opened by the Prosecutors Office and Anti-Corruption Agency into the agreement with the Turkish energy company, Botash, for the supply of natural gas to Bulgaria. As the deal had been signed by the Radev appointed Donev caretaker government, Radev was criticised by politicians, specifically from GERB, for enabling the agreement. In a statement to the press, he defended the agreement with Botash, and claimed that any issues with it were caused by its execution. On 24 July, the Constitutional Court ruled against the abolition of the new caretaker government appointment system created by the 2023 constitutional amendments. Radev argued that the ruling perpetuated the "disbalance in the separation of powers" and claimed the constitutional changes have put "loyalty" instead of competence as the primary criteria in the selection of caretaker governments.

In July 2025, Radev vetoed a new law about medical insurance, opposing its scaling back of public healthcare coverage. Radev also refused to appoint a new head of DANS, and a Secretary of the Ministry of Interior. Radev's opposition, like Zhelyazkov, accused him of obstructing the government's work. Radev claimed that he had instead was helping the government, taking credit for investments from German company Rheinmetall. He also criticised the incumbent government for relying on foreign aid to reduce Bulgaria's wildfires. In August 2025, Radev approved Miroslav Rashkov to be the new Secretary of the Ministry of Interior. He then accused the government of organising a purge within the SANS. In September, he vetoed the government's proposal to sell 4,400 state properties which they stated were no longer necessary, although his veto was overturned. In October 2025, the parliament passed a law which reduced Presidential involvement in the appointment of key security services. Radev claimed the government was politiczing the security services, and taking control of them to use them against its opposition. His veto of the law was overturned by the National Assembly.

After a law was passed which removed NSS-provided cars from members of the presidential administration, Radev announced that he would use his personal vehicle to travel in solidarity with his staff. In response, Peevski proposed that cars and drivers previously used by the NSS are transferred to the presidency; a proposal which was endorsed by GERB. Radev rejected the proposal, claiming that the creation of a car park within the presidency would take too long. Radev heavily criticized the 2026 budget proposed by the Zhelyazkov government and endorsed protests against it. On 1 December, he officially called for the government's resignation and early elections. Asked about the possibility of forming a political party in upcoming legislative elections, Radev lamented that he would enter electoral politics "when it was least expected".

==== Zhelyazkov government resignation ====
Following the protests, on 11 December, the Zhelyazkov government resigned. Following this, the President scheduled constitutionally-mandated consultations with all parliamentary groups. During the consultations, all the parliamentary groups agreed that the formation of a new government within the parliament was impossible and that new elections should be scheduled as soon as possible. Furthermore, most of the parliamentary groups, PP-DB, Revival and MECh in particular, urged the President to schedule new elections in March or April, to avoid holding the election during the winter months. During the consultations, Radev further raised the question of amending the electoral code in order to ensure greater trust in the electoral process. PP-DB, Revival, MECh, and Velichie all expressed support for the re-introduction of voting through machine installations, while ITN and DPS-NN argued for the use of machine scanners to count votes.

Radev was asked by representatives from GERB, PP-DB, and Revival about whether he planned to participate in the upcoming parliamentary elections with his own political party. After the consultations ended, Radev announced that he would present the first mandate for government formation in January 2026. On 31 December 2025, Radev called for a societal mobilisation for upcoming elections in order to maintain the energy generated by the earlier protests, and criticised the introduction of the Euro without a referendum.

On 12 January, he formally granted the first exploratory mandate to acting Prime Minister, Zhelyazkov, who had been nominated as GERB-SDS' Prime Ministerial candidate. Zhelyazkov returned the first mandate unfulfilled. On 14 January, the Prime Ministerial candidate nominated by PP-DB, Nadezhda Yordanova, similarly returned the second mandate unfulfilled immediately after it had been given to her by the President. Radev selected the Dogan-led Alliance for Rights and Freedoms to receive the third mandate, which was widely interpreted by analysts as a slight against Peevski. Despite speculation about the possibility of APS retaining the third mandate in order to explore government formation possibilities, the parliamentary group's representative, Hayri Sadakov, returned the third mandate unfulfilled on 16 January making snap legislative elections inevitable.

With snap legislative elections confirmed, speculation about the possibility of a Radev-affiliated political project participating in them intensified. On 20 December 2025, a political party called "Third of March Movement" was founded, which declared Radev as its "informal leader"; however, Radev disavowed them. On 14 January, when asked about the possibility of forming his own party, Radev claimed that his party already existed and represented the "anti-mafia consensus in Bulgaria". During an address to the nation on 19 January 2026, Radev announced his intention to resign. On 20 January, he submitted his resignation as president to the Constitutional Court. On 23 January, the Constitutional Court formally accepted Radev's resignation as president. Shortly after, Radev and Iotova left the "Dondukov 2" palace together, and addressed supporters, promising a unified struggle at the upcoming legislative elections.

== Foreign policy ==
=== Relations with Russia and views on the Russia–Ukraine war ===
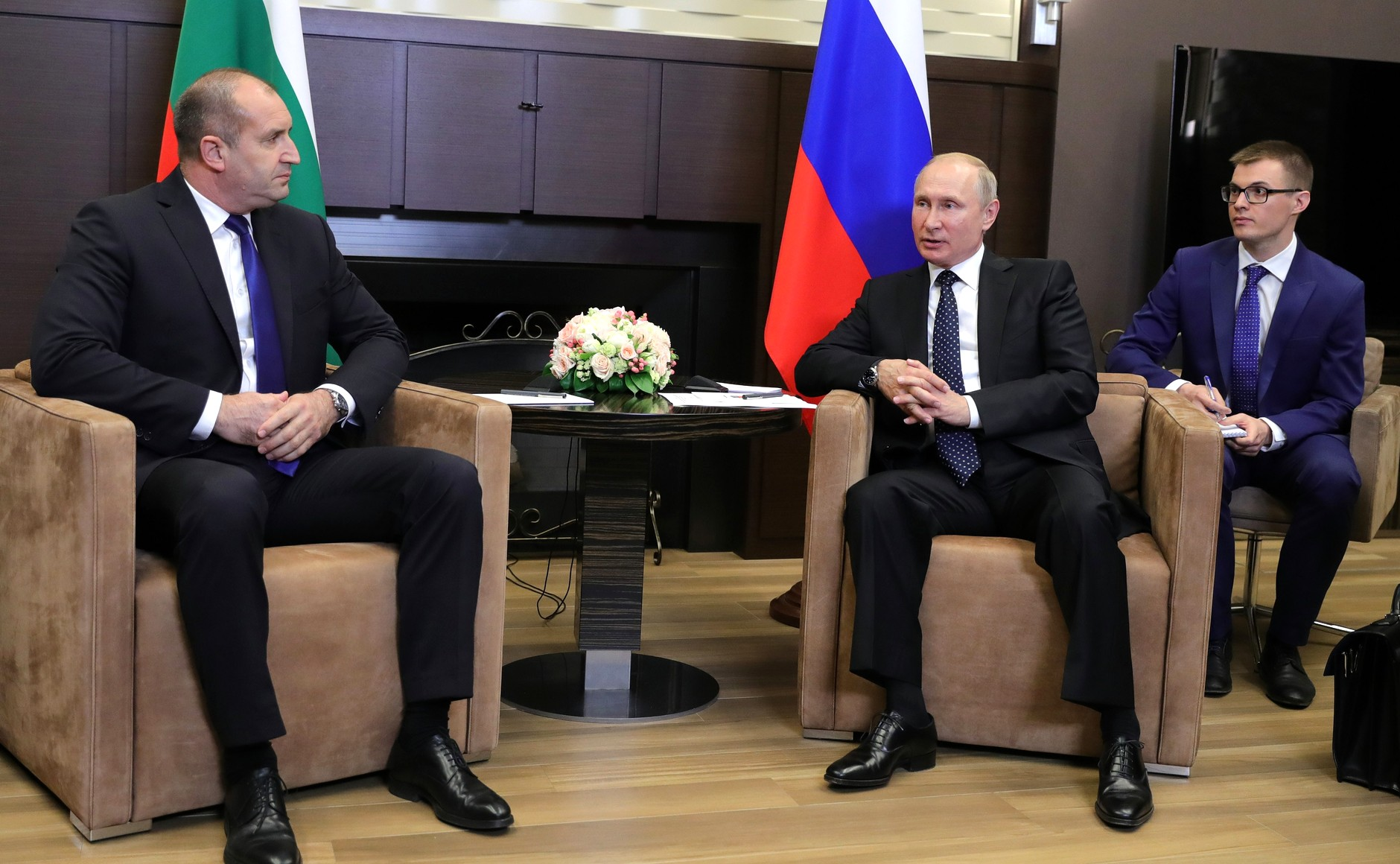
Radev with Russian President Vladimir Putin in Sochi, 22 May 2018

In February 2017, Radev condemned and called for an end to the EU sanctions against Russia, while at the same time describing the Annexation of Crimea by the Russian Federation as a "violation of international law". In April 2022, Radev broke ranks with the Petkov government, declaring that he is fully opposed to Bulgaria providing weapons to Ukraine in relation to Russia's invasion of the latter, characterizing it as a step towards the direct involvement of Bulgaria in the conflict and seeing it as contrary to the pursuit of a peaceful solution. On 23 September 2022, Radev came out with what has been described as "his strongest statement yet on the Russian-Ukrainian conflict", calling the Russian organised referendums "unacceptable" and denouncing the use of "'the nuclear card'" by the Russian leadership.

On 2 October 2022, Radev refused to sign a declaration produced by other Eastern and Central European Presidents, which endorsed future Ukrainian ascension into NATO, citing the fact that discussions of Ukrainian membership were "too early" and had to involve collective decisions by NATO structures. Upon returning to Bulgaria from the NATO summit on 7 October, Radev reiterated his position that discussing Ukrainian ascension into NATO was too early, and further underlined his opposition to the provision of military aid to Ukraine.

During the December 2022 EU summit to discuss the new sanctions package, Radev threatened to veto it, if it included sanctions on the export of nuclear fuel, and further called on fellow EU leaders to begin to "refocus" their work towards achieving a ceasefire in the Ukrainian conflict. In February 2023, Radev signed a joint-declaration with the presidents of 9 other Eastern and Central European countries which condemned Russian aggression against Ukraine. At the same time, Radev reiterated his opposition to the sending of lethal aid to Ukraine, including at a meeting with Hungarian prime minister Viktor Orban on 2 February. During the March 2023 EU summit to discuss the procurement of 1 million shells for Ukraine within a year, Radev insisted that Bulgaria would not participate in it, and further claimed he would ensure that Bulgarian ammunition sold to third parties was not sent to Ukraine. Despite this opposition, Radev ended up supporting the European Council resolution which included the provision of ammunition to Ukraine.

In July 2023, Radev met with Ukrainian president Volodymyr Zelenskyy. During the meeting, Radev expressed sympathy for Ukraine, but called for them to open negotiations with Russia in order to deescalate the war. Zelenskyy criticised Radev for his stance on the provision of military aid, saying that European nations have a shared interest in restraining Russia. After the meeting, Radev was criticised by the Denkov government, as well as international media, for purveying beliefs similar to the Russian government's. Radev, in turn, criticised the government for supposedly putting the national interests of Ukraine before those of Bulgaria. He called for Bulgaria to adopt an independent foreign policy from the Europe, and cease to increase lethal aid for Ukraine. At the 2023 UN Annual Global Summit, Radev condemned "the Russian aggression against Ukraine", and called for the UN to work towards "finding peaceful avenues" to resolve the war. Radev did not meet with Zelenskyy, who was also at the UN.

Radev opposed the dispatch of NATO member soldiers into Ukraine, even in a unilateral capacity, believing that this may trigger a war between the Russian Federation and NATO. Radev generally supported the second Trump administration's approach towards Russia, believing it would end the war in Ukraine; he urged the EU to adopt a similar foreign policy towards Russia. He was critical of the "re-armament fund" proposed by the European commission, claiming that it would substantially increase European debt.

=== Relations with Turkey ===
On 17 March 2017, Radev condemned as 'absolutely unacceptable' what he described as a Turkish intervention in Bulgaria's 2017 parliamentary election after the Turkish ambassador to Bulgaria was found to have appeared in a campaign clip for one of Bulgaria's political parties and after Turkish Social Affairs minister was found to have agitated and offer incentives for Bulgarian Turks in Turkey to cross the border in an organized voting campaign and vote for the same party. Radev stated that he had referred the matter to the European Union. He met with Turkish president Recep Tayyip Erdoğan several months later in July, following which he described Turkey as an "important neighbour, partner and ally", while at the same time stating that this status hinged on Turkey's respect for Bulgaria's "internal political process, regarding Bulgaria's political parties and electoral system". He also became the only EU head of state to attend Erdoğan's inauguration, stating that his mandate was not given to him by either the European Commission or the Bulgarian Government, but by the Bulgarian people.

On 24 January 2018, Radev condemned the Turkish invasion of northern Syria aimed at ousting U.S.-backed Syrian Kurds from the enclave of Afrin, and insisted that the European Union should intervene to stop it. During the campaign for the Bulgarian legislative elections in 2021, Radev accused Erdoğan of meddling with Bulgaria's internal affairs after participating in a video-conference with Bulgarian political party, DPS. In December 2022, Radev visited Erdoğan, achieving a deal to enhance border security and increase cooperation in the energy sector.

On 29 May 2023, Radev congratulated Erdoğan with his re-election after the 2023 Turkish presidential election, and later attended his inauguration, being the only European Union head of state to do so. During the inauguration, Radev and Erdoğan had a short meeting, during which Radev underlined the progress being made in economic relations between the two countries, particularly focusing on the agreement with Turkish gas company Botas.

=== Relations with North Macedonia ===
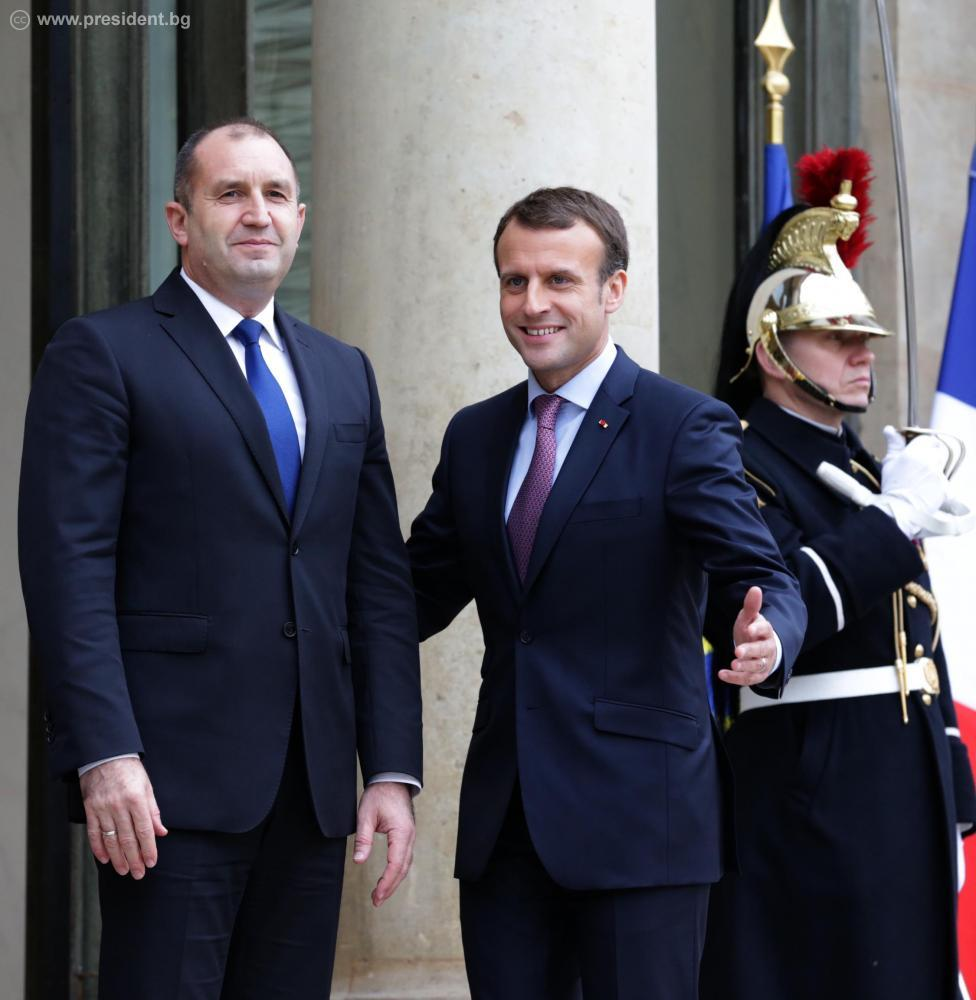
Radev with French president Emmanuel Macron in Paris, 4 December 2017

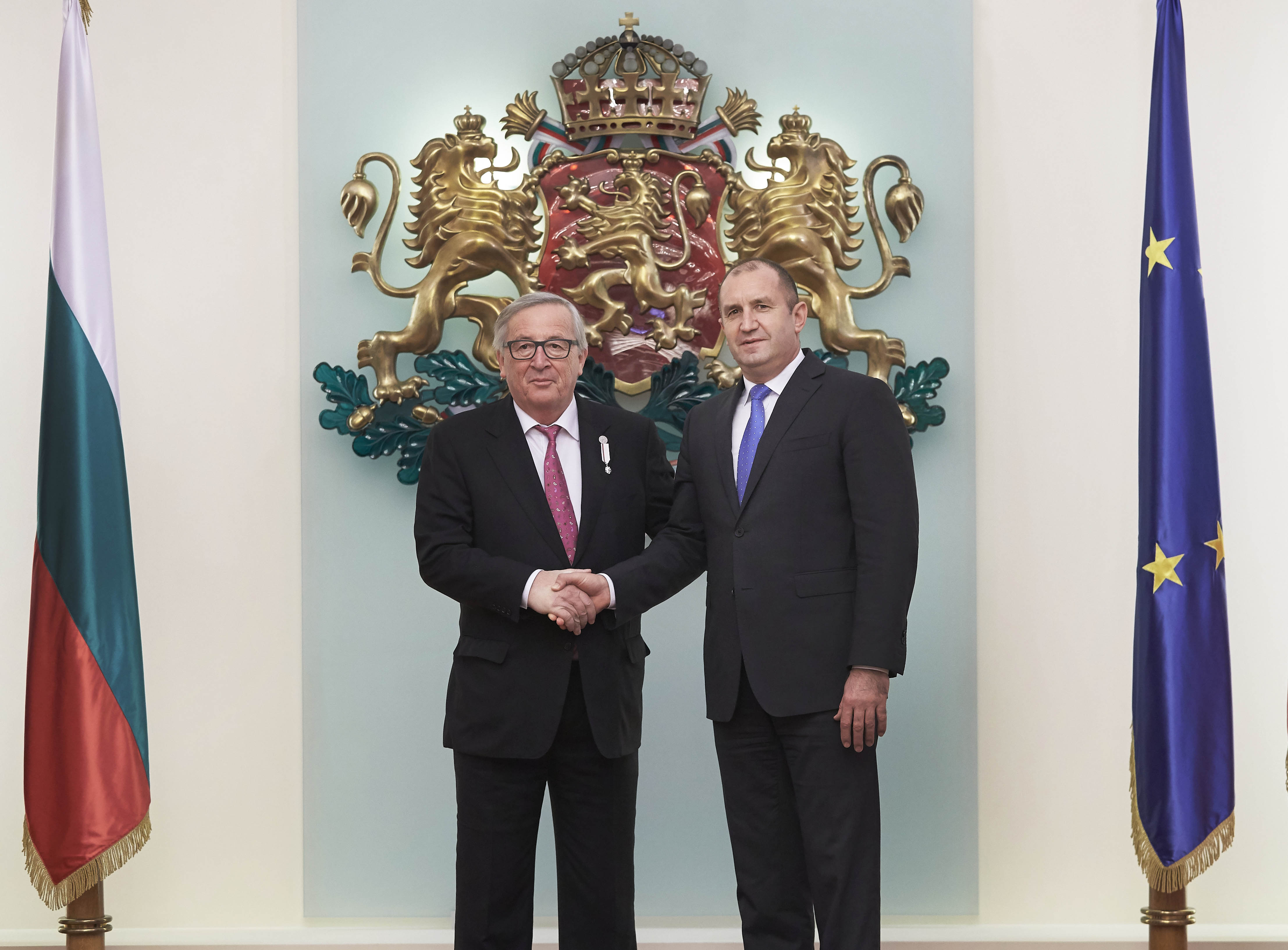
Radev with President of the European Commission Jean-Claude Juncker in Sofia, 12 January 2018

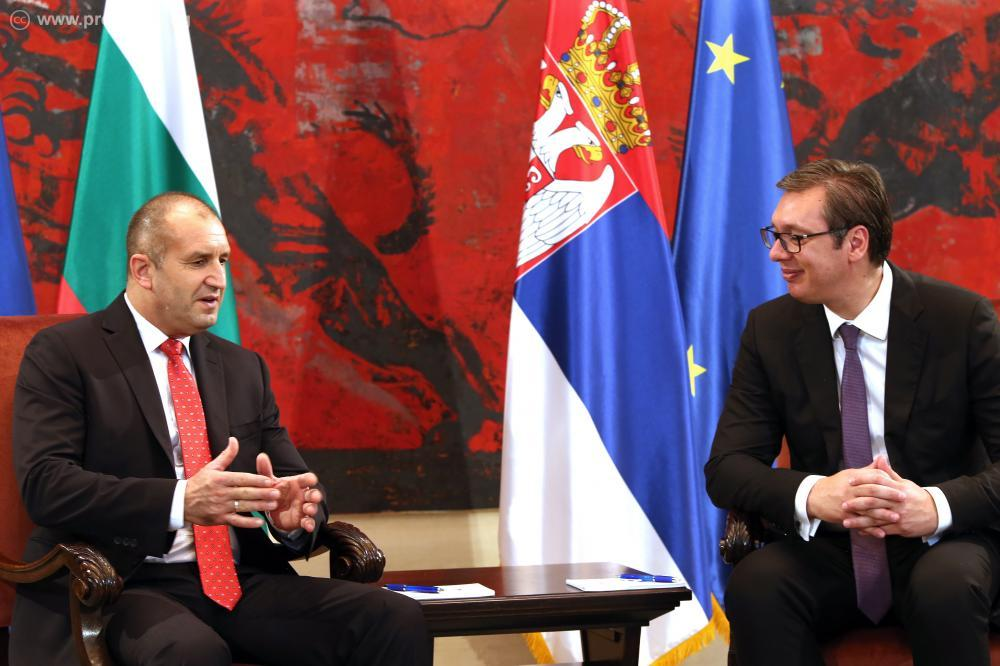
Radev with Serbian president Aleksandar Vučić in Belgrade, 21 June 2018

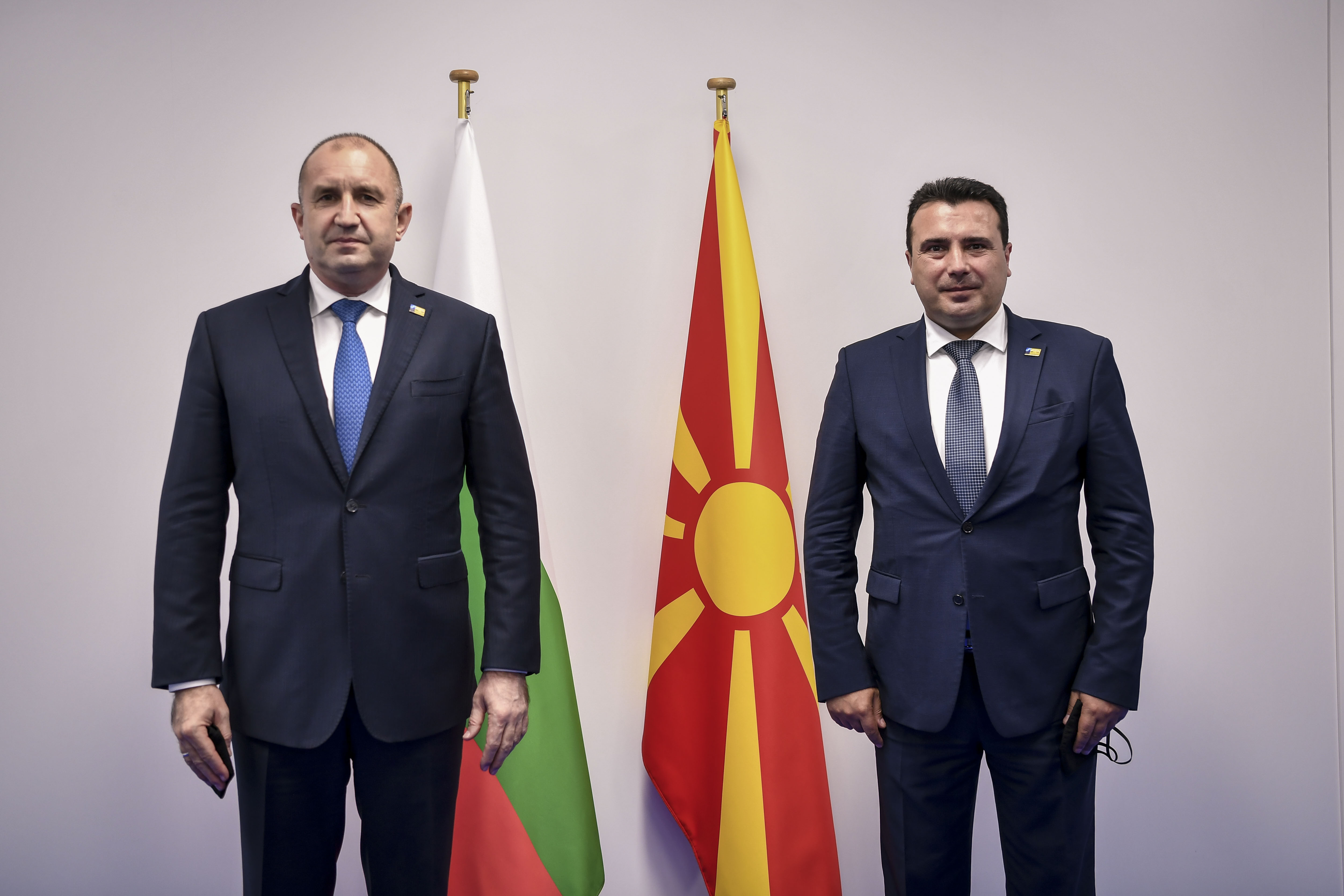
Radev with North Macedonian prime minister Zoran Zaev in Brussels, 14 June 2021

Radev has been critical of the EU accession of the Republic of North Macedonia. Radev has opposed the possibility of lifting the veto on North Macedonia's Eurointegration, at the very least until Bulgarians are added to the Constitution of North Macedonia. Radev has also asked for increased European Union-level action to prevent hate speech against Bulgarians living in North Macedonia.

Radev condemned the behaviour of the newly elected president of North Macedonia, Gordana Siljanovska-Davkova, and called for North Macedonia to adhere to existing treaties. The president maintained that the reluctance to observe the Treaty of Friendship with Bulgaria, signed in 2017, is an obstacle to the development of bilateral relations.

In September 2024, Radev met with Siljanovska-Davkova, at which key bilateral issues between the two countries were discussed. The meeting, which according to both sides had taken place in a pleasant and constructive atmosphere, provoked severely negative reactions from North Macedonian politicians, after a photo of the two presidents was published in which only the Bulgarian flag was present. In June 2025, Radev sent a letter to European Union leaders denouncing the report about North Macedonia's EU accession, which included the recognition of the Macedonian language and identity, and was categorised as being "weak" on the rights of Bulgarians by Bulgarian politicians.

=== Response to the 2023 Hamas-led attack on Israel ===
On the day of the attack by Hamas on Israel, Radev made a statement on X condemning the Hamas-led attack on Israel and expressing solidarity with Israel. On 11 October, Radev held a national security meeting with the cabinet and representatives of the security apparatus, which excluded members of parliament, as in a traditional Consulative Council for National Security. Following this meeting, Radev and the prime minister, Denkov, came out with a joint-press briefing, at which Radev declared there was no imminent national security risk due to the Hamas-led attack, although the risk of migrant pressure on the border with Turkey, as well as possible infiltration by terrorist groups had increased.

Radev participated in a "prayer for peace" within the Central Sofia Synagogue, together with many other Bulgarian politicians, expressing disgust at "the cruel and violent acts committed by the terrorists" and solidarity with Israel. At the UN, Radev called for an immediate ceasefire in Gaza and called on Hamas to release all the Israeli hostages.

=== Other foreign policy activities ===
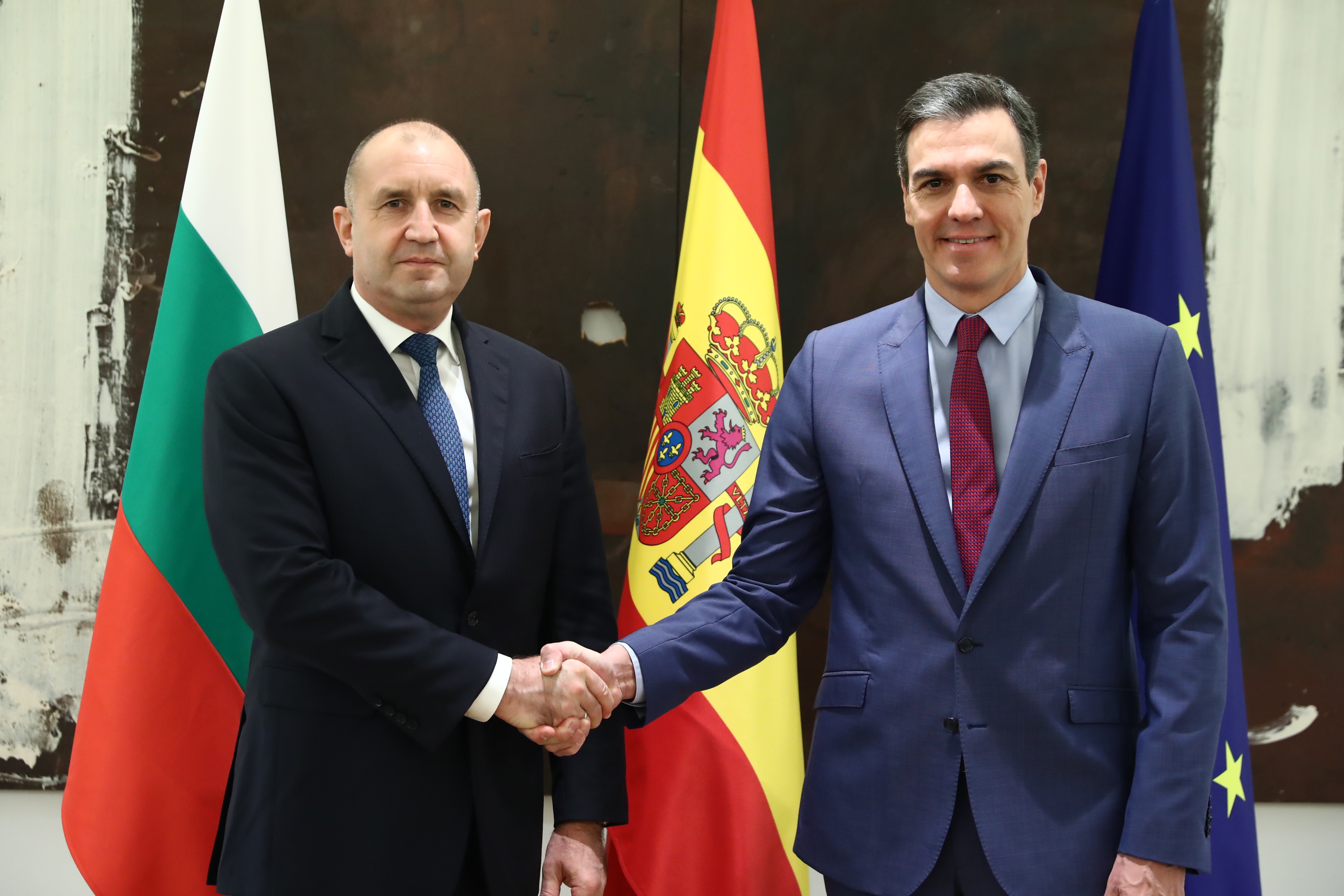
Radev with Spanish Prime Minister Pedro Sánchez in Madrid, 28 April 2022

In April 2018, Radev criticised the 2018 missile strikes against Syria, instead calling for "less weapons and more dialogue". In February 2019, Radev condemned the third Borisov government's recognition of Venezuelan opposition leader Juan Guaidó as interim president of Venezuela during the 2019 Venezuelan presidential crisis, adding that he believed the government had overstepped its authority in recognizing the opposition leader as interim president. Radev further criticised the EU's recognition of Guaido, urging both the country and the EU to remain neutral and refrain from recognizing Guaido, as he viewed such recognition as imposing an ultimatum, which he deemed would only aggravate the crisis in Venezuela.

Radev was critical of the positions of Austria and the Netherlands, two countries that announced in December 2022 they would veto the ascension of Bulgaria into the Schengen Area, calling the decision "cynical" and in contrast with the concept of European solidarity. During an EU summit on 15 December 2022, Radev called on EU leaders to give a clear time table for Bulgaria's membership in the Schengen Area before the end of 2023, stating that Schengen membership was critical to "Bulgarian dignity as part of the European family". Radev further continued to insist that there were no valid reasons for Bulgaria's non-ascension into the Schengen Area, citing a 2011 European Commission Report which found Bulgaria ready to join the Schengen Area.

== Approval ratings ==
Radev enjoyed positive approval ratings for the vast majority of his presidency. Having been elected with around 60% of the vote in 2016, he managed to keep that figure as his approval rating through to 2018. His approval then rose to 67% by May 2018, before falling to around 56% by autumn 2019; however, even after this fall in his popularity, he was still considered the most popular and approved of Bulgarian politician, as well as one of the only two Bulgarian politicians (the other being Maya Manolova) with a higher percentage of approval than disapproval.

By April 2020, Radev's approval ratings stood at about 49%. Radev began his second term as president with an approval rating of 58.5% according to a Gallup poll. Subsequently, Radev declined in popularity in opinion polls, reaching its lowest point of 33% in an Alpha Research poll in June 2023. Radev's approval recovered throughout 2024 and 2025, averaging around 40% before his resignation in January 2026.

== See also ==
- List of heads of government of Bulgaria
- List of heads of state of Bulgaria
- List of presidents of Bulgaria (1990–present)
