= List of mayors of Plovdiv =

This is a chronological list of mayors of Plovdiv, the second largest city of Bulgaria, since that post was established after the Liberation of Bulgaria in 1878.

mandate	mayor
1878	Atanas Samokovliev
1878-1880	Kostaki Peev
1880-1883	Ivan Stefanov Geshov
1884-1887	Kostaki Peev (2nd inconsecutive term)
1883-1884	Petko Karavelov
1887-1890	Hristo Dyukmedzhiev
1890-1893	Dimitar Sveshtarov
1893	Konstantin Hadzhikalchov
1893-1894	Mancho Manev
1894	Mihail Madzharov
1894-1897	Danail Yurukov
1897-1899	Hristo G. Danov
1899-1901	Nikola Chalakov
1901	Dragan Manchov
1901-1902	Hristo Tanchev
1902-1903	Georgi Dzhevizov
1903-1905	Hristo Milev
1905-1906	Nikola Chalakov (2nd inconsecutive term)
1906-1908	Valko Shopov
1908-1912	Dr. Ivan Kesyakov
1912-1914	Nikola Kozarev
1914-1918	Denyu Manev
1918-1919	Milosh Danov
1919	Stefan Gevgalov
1919	Hristo Pavlov
1919	Hariton Kuev
1919-1920	Nikola Galabov
1920-1921	Petar Shilev
1921-1922	Dr. Ivan Kesyakov (2nd inconsecutive term)
1922-1923	Petar Yanakov
1923-1927	Petar Drenski
1927-1928	Dr. Panayot Kostov
1928-1929	Milosh Danov (2nd inconsecutive term)
1929-1932	Enyu Manolov
1932-1935	Bozhidar Zdravkov
1935-1936	Georgi Todorov
1936-1939	Bozhidar Zdravkov (2nd inconsecutive term)
1939-1943	Petar Malchev
1943-1944	Dimitar Kostov
1944-1945	Asen Kozhuharov
1945-1949	Ivan Perpeliev
1949-1959	Nikola Balkandzhiev
1959-1963	Atanas Kostov
1963-1965	Ivan Dimitrov
1965-1968	Ivan Panev
1968-1971	Kosta Kumanov
1971-1979	Diran Parikyan
1979-1986	Hristo Mishev
1986-1988	Dimitar Bakalov
1988-1990	Todor Petkov
1990-1991	Nikolay Somlev
1991-1995	Dr. Garabed Tomasyan
1995-1999	Spas Garnevski
1999-2007	Ivan Chomakov
2007-2011	Slavcho Atanasov
2011-2019	Ivan Totev
2019-2023	Zdravko Dimitrov
2023-	Kostadin Dimitrov

== See also ==
- Timeline of Plovdiv
- List of mayors of Sofia
- List of mayors of Varna
- List of mayors of Pleven
