= List of mayors of Varna =

This is a chronological list of mayors of Varna, the third largest city of Bulgaria, since that post was established after the Liberation of Bulgaria in 1878.

mandate	mayor
1878	Petar Popov
1878-1879	Veliko Hristov
1879-1881	Yanko Slavchev
1881-1885	Mihail Koloni
1888	Haralan Angelov
1888	Kiro Merazchiev
1888	Haralan Angelov (2nd inconsecutive term)
1888-1890	Krastyu Mirski
1890-1893	Mihail Koloni (2nd inconsecutive term)
1893-1894	Rusi Mateev
1894-1895	Kosta Rankov
1895	Nikola Valkanov
1895-1896	Yanko Slavchev (2nd inconsecutive term)
1896-1899	Zheko Zhekov
1899-1901	Kosta Rankov
1902-1903	Panayot Kardzhiev
1903-1904	Damyan Perelingov
1904-1905	Dr. Angel Pyuskyuliev
1905-1906	Krastyu Mirski (2nd inconsecutive term)
1906-1908	Dr. Angel Pyuskyuliev (2nd inconsecutive term)
1908-1909	Dobri Filov
1909-1912	Ivan Tserov
1912-1915	Aleksandar Vasilev
1915-1919	Stancho Savov
1919-1921	Dimitar Kondov
1921	Yurdan Pekarev
1921-1922	Teodosi Atanasov
1922	Zlatan Brachkov
1922-1923	Gospodin Angelov
1923	Hristo Mirski
1923-1927	Petar Stoyanov
1927-1930	Nikola Popov
1930-1932	Parvan Byanov
1932-1933	Asen Brusev
1933-1934	Panayot Panayotov
1934-1935	Stancho Savov (2nd inconsecutive term)
1934-1935	Yanko Mustakov
1936	Yosif Stoyanov
1936-1943	Yanko Mustakov (2nd inconsecutive term)
1943-1944	Nikola Dimitrov
1944	Petar Stoyanov (2nd inconsecutive term)
1944-1945	Lyubomir Dimov
1945-1951	Geno Gutev
1956-1957	Georgi Kostov
1951-1956	Sergey Todorov
1957-1959	Vasil Popov
1959-1966	Nikolay Boyadzhiev
1966-1971	Atanas Nikolov
1971-1979	Stanoy Yonev
1979-1985	Hristo Toshkov
1985-1990	Bogdan Karadenchev
1990	Georgi Paspalev
1990-1991	Voyno Voynov
1991-1999	Hristo Kirchev
1999-2013	Kiril Yordanov
2013-2023	Ivan Portnih
2023-	Blagomir Kotsev

== See also ==
- List of mayors of Sofia
- List of mayors of Plovdiv
- List of mayors of Pleven
