= List of mayors of Pleven =

This is a chronological list of mayors of Pleven, the seventh largest city of Bulgaria, since that post was established after the Liberation of Bulgaria in 1877–1878.

mandate	mayor
1877-1878	Atanas Kostov
1878	Georgi Kostov
1880-1881	Petar Hitsov
1883-1885	Haralampi Karaivanov
1885-1888	Simeon Haydudov
1888-1890	Haralampi Karaivanov (2nd inconsecutive term)
1890-1892	Simeon Haydudov (2nd inconsecutive term)
1898-1899	Hristo Danailov
1899-1900	Ivan Yurdanov
1900	Todor Shtirkov
1901	Todor Tsvetkov
1901	Ivan Yurdanov (2nd inconsecutive term)
1901-1903	Hristo Danailov (2nd inconsecutive term)
1903-1908	Todor Tabakov
1912-1913	Georgi Uzunov
1913-1918	Dimitar Dobrev
1919-1921	Ivan Kantardzhiev
1921-1922	Georgi Chervenkov
1922-1923	Ivan Zonkov
1923-1931	Ivan Mindilikov
1934-1937	Nikola Marinov
1937-1938	Kosta Stefanov
1937-1938 and 1938-1944	Stoyan Valchev
1946-1948	Vasil Topalski
1948-1949	Dr. Rusi Rusev
1949-1950	Boris Bozhinov
1951-1953	Georgi Uzunov
1956-1959	Todor Aleksiev
1959-1963	Radoy Tsochev
1963-1971	Lyubomir Nachev
1971-1979	Andrey Romanov
1979-1986	Trifon Trifonov
1986-1987	Krum Radev
1987-1990	Petko Tsolov
1990-1991	Georgi Angelov
1991-1995	Dr. Aleksandar Aleksandrov
1995-1999	Rumen Petkov
1999-2011	Nayden Zelenogorski
2011-2015	Dimitar Stoykov, M.D. (Доц. Димитър Стойков)
2015-2023	Georg Spartanski
2023-	Dr. Valentin Hristov

== See also ==
- List of mayors of Sofia
- List of mayors of Plovdiv
- List of mayors of Varna
