= Rumen Rashev =

Bulgarian politician

- Румен Рашев

41st Mayor of Veliko Tarnovo
- In office 1999 – October 23, 2011
- Preceded by: Dragni Dragnev
- Succeeded by: Daniel Panov

Personal details
- Born: 26 March 1955 (age 71) Veliko Tarnovo, Bulgaria
- Party: SDS
- Education: Medical University, Sofia

Rumen Georgiev Rashev (Bulgarian: Румен Георгиев Рашев; born 26 March 1955) is a Bulgarian politician of the Union of Democratic Forces (Bulgaria) who was the mayor of Veliko Tarnovo between 1999 and 2011. He worked as a doctor in ''Stefan Cherkezov'' hospital from 1981 to 1997. He is a member of the Freemasonry community.

== Biography ==
Rumen Rashev is born 26 March 1955 in Veliko Tarnovo. He graduated the Medical University in Sofia.

=== Political career ===
In the period from 1997 to 1998 he was the district governor of Lovech Province. At that time, Veliko Tarnovo was still part of the Lovech region. On February 1, 1999, Veliko Tarnovo became a province and Rashev became the governor of the new district.

==== Mayor of Veliko Tarnovo ====
In 1999, Rashev became the mayor of Veliko Tarnovo. In 2003 he won a second term, and in 2007 he has been re-elected mayor for the third time.

== Litigation ==
In March 2012, the Veliko Tarnovo Court of Appeal sentenced him to three years in prison. In May 2012, the case was returned for reconsideration by the Supreme Court of Cassation, which sharply criticized the appellate court for politically motivated bias. In October 2013, the Plovdiv Court of Appeals again issued a conviction against Rashev, serving a suspended sentence of 2 years.
