= Daniel Panov =

Bulgarian politician and mayor of Veliko Tarnovo

- Даниел Панов
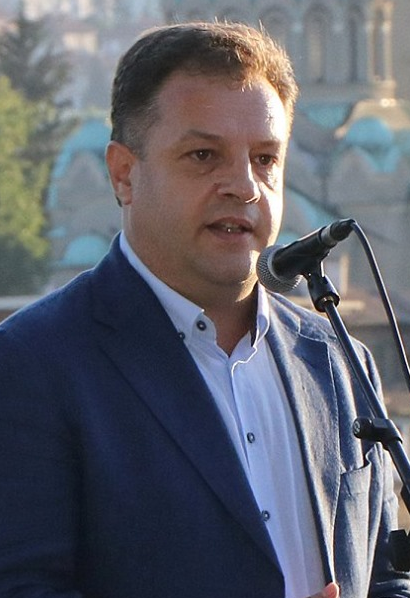

42nd Mayor of Veliko Tarnovo
- Incumbent
- Assumed office 23 October 2011
- Preceded by: Rumen Rashev

Personal details
- Born: 4 October 1967 (age 59) Veliko Tarnovo, Bulgaria
- Party: GERB
- Spouse: Daniela Panova
- Children: 2
- Education: Veliko Tarnovo University, Vasil Levski National Military University

Daniel Dimitrov Panov (Bulgarian: Даниел Димитров Панов; born 4 October 1967) is a Bulgarian politician of GERB who has been the mayor of Veliko Tarnovo since 2011.

== Biography ==
Panov was born on October 4, 1967, in Veliko Tarnovo, Bulgaria. He graduated in Public Administration at the Veliko Tarnovo University and mechanical engineering Vasil Levski National Military University. He was part of the Bulgarian Army, as an assistant commander and platoon commander (1989 - 1996), company commander (1996 - 1999), commandant (1999 - 2002). Since 2002 he has been a manager of Tsarevgrad Tarnov EOOD. In 2009, he received the award of the State Tourism Agency for contribution in promoting cultural tourism. Next year, he received a personal award from the Minister of Economy, Energy and Tourism for the management of Samovodska Charshiya Architectural and Ethnographic Complex, and the same year, he became the recipient of the Tourism Manager Award by the Ministry of Economy, Energy and Tourism for the Sound and Light Audio-Visual Spectacle.

Currently Panov and his family live in Arbanasi, Bulgaria. Panov's grandfather used to be the mayor of the village.

=== Military ranks ===
- 1989-1999, Assistant Commander and Platoon Commander
- 1996-1999, Company Commander
- 1999-2002, Commandant

== Political career ==
On 23 October 2011, as member of the political party GERB, he was elected mayor of Veliko Tarnovo. Panov received 51.81% of the vote in the elections. He was also elected in 2015. In 2019, Panov received 60,55% and won over the Bulgarian Socialist Party nominee Vesela Lecheva who received 22,22%.

In 2016 he was elected chairperson of the Management Board of the National Association of Bulgarian Municipalities (NABM).
