= Trakiya district =

District of Plovdiv, Bulgaria

Coordinates: 42°8′1″N 24°47′9″E

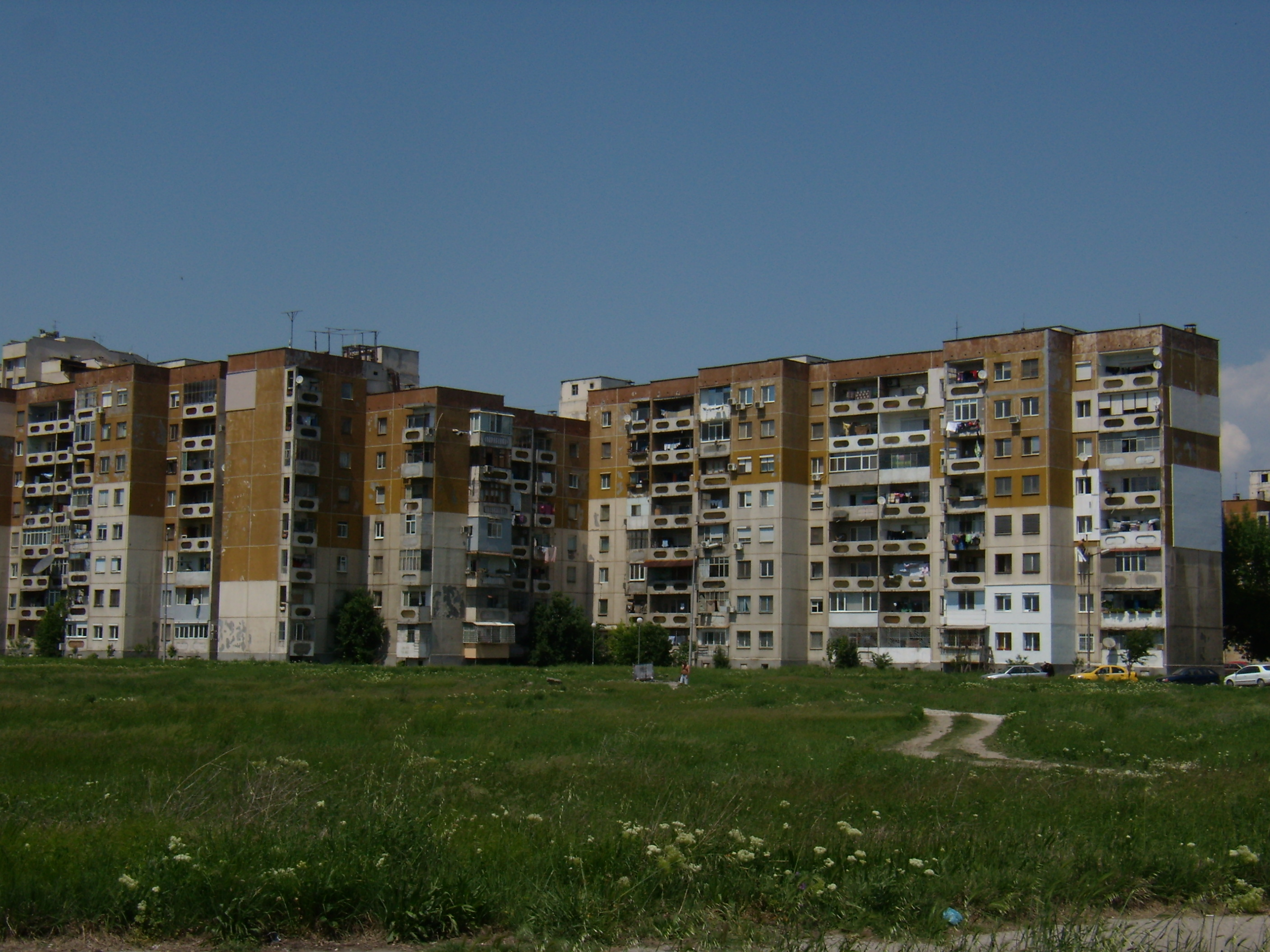
A view of Trakiya.

Trakiya (transliterated from Bulgarian: Тракия, and from which the English-language name Thrace is translated) is the largest neighbourhood of Plovdiv as well as one of the six districts of the city located in its south-eastern parts. It has 61,920 inhabitants. Its construction began in 1973, in 1976 it was inaugurated as a neighbourhoods and in 1983 it became a district. Trakiya is one of the largest area with blocks of flats in Bulgaria.

== Structure ==
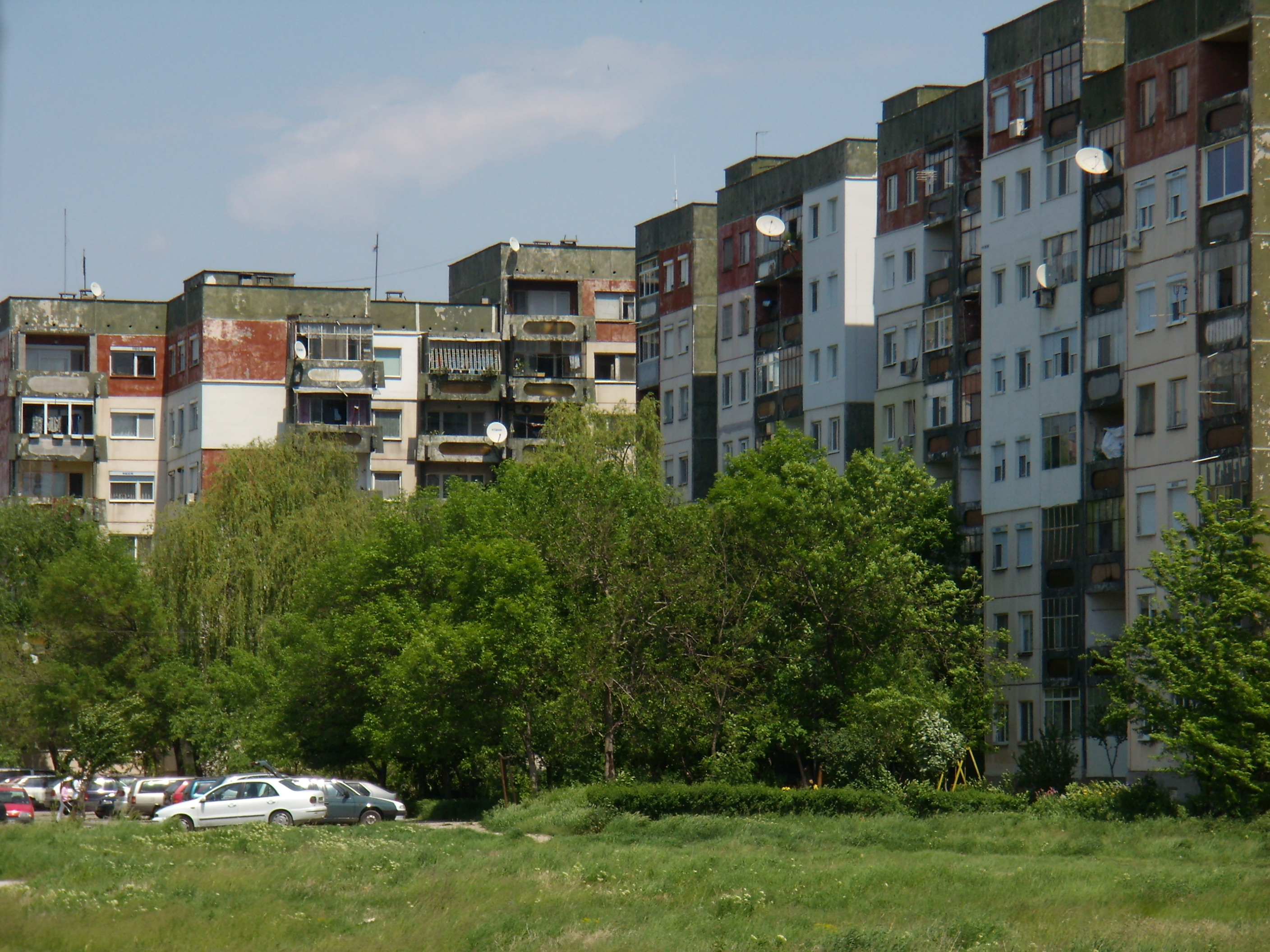
Trakiya.

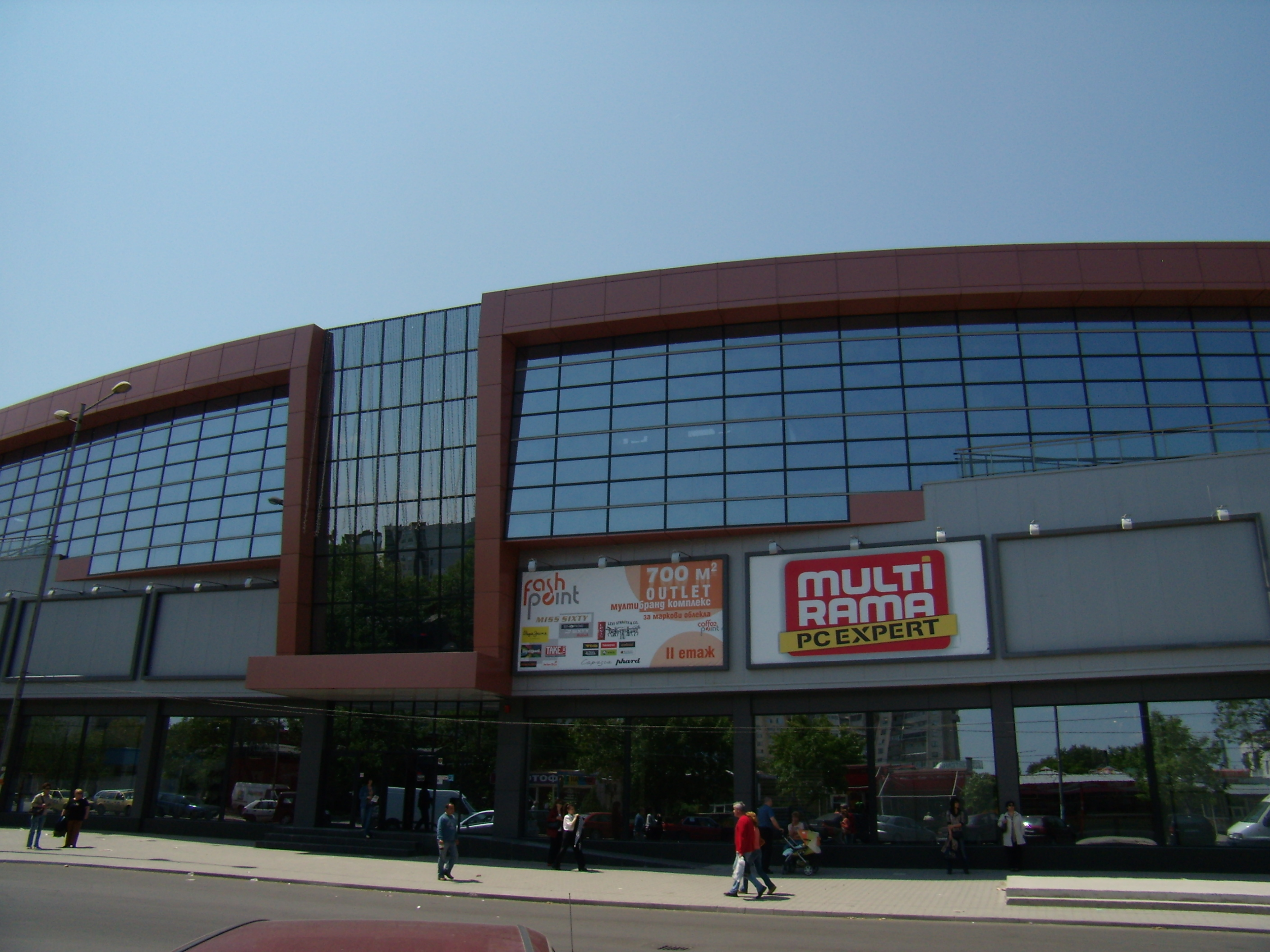
A shopping center.

The district has an area of 5,660 km^{2} of which 0,193 km^{2} are green spaces and 0,45 km^{2} are included in the forest-park Lauta. Trakiya has a well-developed infrastructure. It has 48 km of streets and 46 km pavements. There are 252 blocks of flats with 770 separate entrances. The district is subdivided into the following microdistricts:

- А-1 - bl. No. 200–229
- А-2 - bl. No. 190-199, 330–339
- А-3 - bl. No. 170–189
- А-4 - bl. No. 140-159, 326–328
- А-5 - bl. No. 120–139
- А-6 - bl. No. 100–119
- А-7 - bl. No. 80-96, 314–322
- А-8 - bl. No. 60–79
- А-9 - bl. No. 1-19, 44, 310
- А-10 - bl. No. 20-39, 311–313
- А-11 - bl. No. 40–56
- А-12 (Lauta neighbourhood, near Lauta park) - bl. No. 57-59, 230–264
- А-13 (Olga Skobeleva neighbourhood, near the Botanic garden) - bl. No. 97-99А, 265–299

== Sights ==
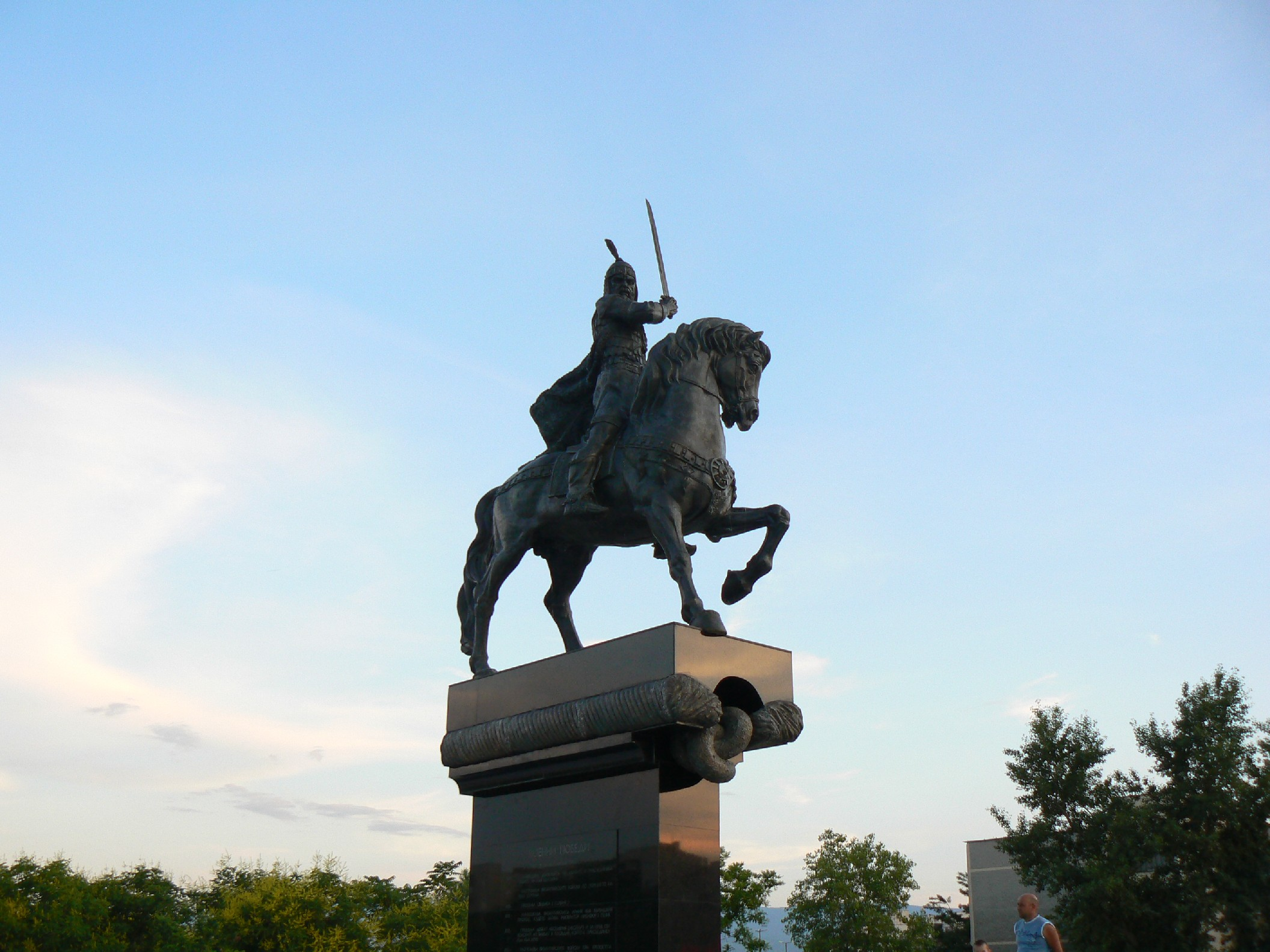
The monument to Khan Krum.

On 4 June 2007 the President Georgi Parvanov inaugurated a new monument to Khan Krum in the district. The 13-metre high composition includes a six-metre pedestal of black granite and a bronze figure of the Khan standing upright on the saddle of his horse with a sword in his hand. It was cast in Sopot using 3 tons of metal and was made by the sculptor Nikolai Savov. The children from the district of Trakiya walled up a message to the next generation which is to be opened on 26 July 2111. On that day 1300 years will have elapsed since Krum's great victory in the battle of the Varbitsa Pass over the Byzantine Emperor Nicephorus I. It was placed in a special urn made in the Ferrous-metal Factory between Plovdiv and Asenovgrad.

The Botanic garden and the Lauta park are situated in the district of Trakiya. There is a large sports-complex in the park which includes the football stadium of PFC Lokomotiv Plovdiv, karting track, bowling and sport halls. In 2006 was inaugurated Aqualand - a large water entertainment facility.

The Agrarian University of Plovdiv is located in the north-western part of the district and to the south are situated railway station "Trakiya" and Trakiya Industrial Zone. There are a number of large shops such as RUM Trakiya, Detski Svyat, Mebelna Kushta. Many hypermarkets and trade centres were constructed in the past few years including Kaufland, Sani, Metro, Technopolis, Evropa, Zora, Yusk, Arcada. There are several more shopping centres and malls currently under construction.

== Administration ==
The district became a separate administrative division in 1983. In 1987 the local administration was reformed as "Tenth city counsel" and in 1995 it was again reformed as District of Trakiya. The first mayor of Trakiya was Lav Panayotov. Since then it was governed by Todor Petkov, Danail Tarpomanov, Paun Ivanov, Petko Gurgurov, Kolyo Imenov, Veselin Chivchibashiev, Dr Alexandar Panov. From 2003 to 2007 the mayor was Slavcho Atanasov from IMRO – Bulgarian National Movement who is currently mayor of Plovdiv. He was succeeded by Ganyo Minev nominated by a coalition GERB-IMRO – Bulgarian National Movement.

== Education ==
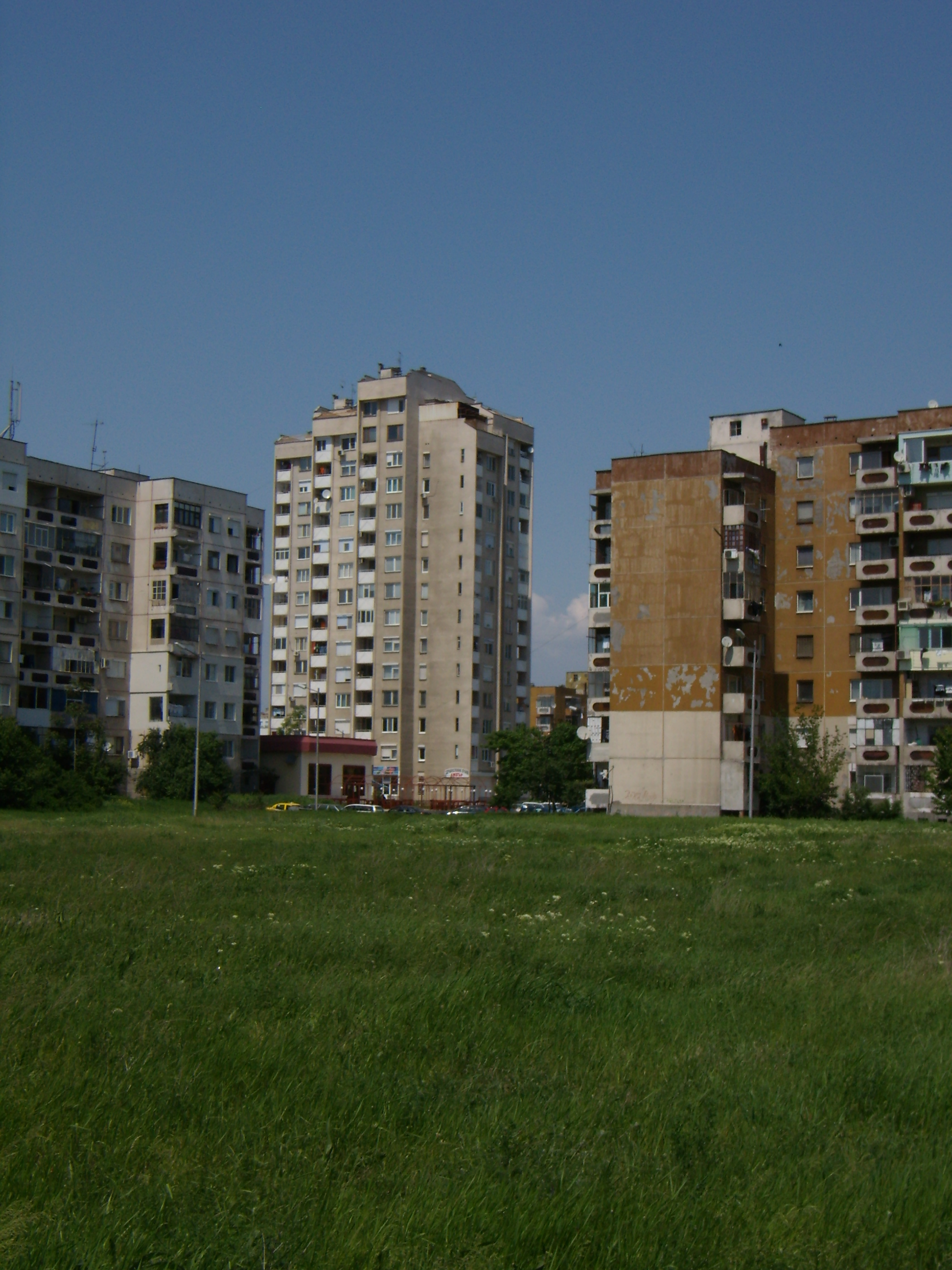
A view of Trakiya.

=== Universities ===
- Agrarian University - Plovdiv

=== High schools ===
- Chernorizets Hrabar High School
- Dimitar Matevski High School
- St Sofronii Vrachanski High School
- St Sedmochislenitsi High School
