= Ivan Chomakov =

Bulgarian politician

Dr. Ivan Chomakov (Bulgarian: Иван Чомаков) (born October 15, 1953) is a Bulgarian politician who was the mayor of the city of Plovdiv, Bulgaria from 1999 to 2007.

Before entering political office, Chomakov was an assistant professor of anaesthesiology.

In 1997, Chomakov was elected to the National Assembly of Bulgaria. He became mayor of Plovdiv in 1999, succeeding Spas Garnevski. In 2003 he was elected Mayor of Plovdiv for a second term. The election in October 2007 were won by Slavcho Atanasov.

== See also ==
- List of mayors of Plovdiv
