= Blagomir Kotsev =

Bulgarian politician (born 1978)

- Благомир Коцев
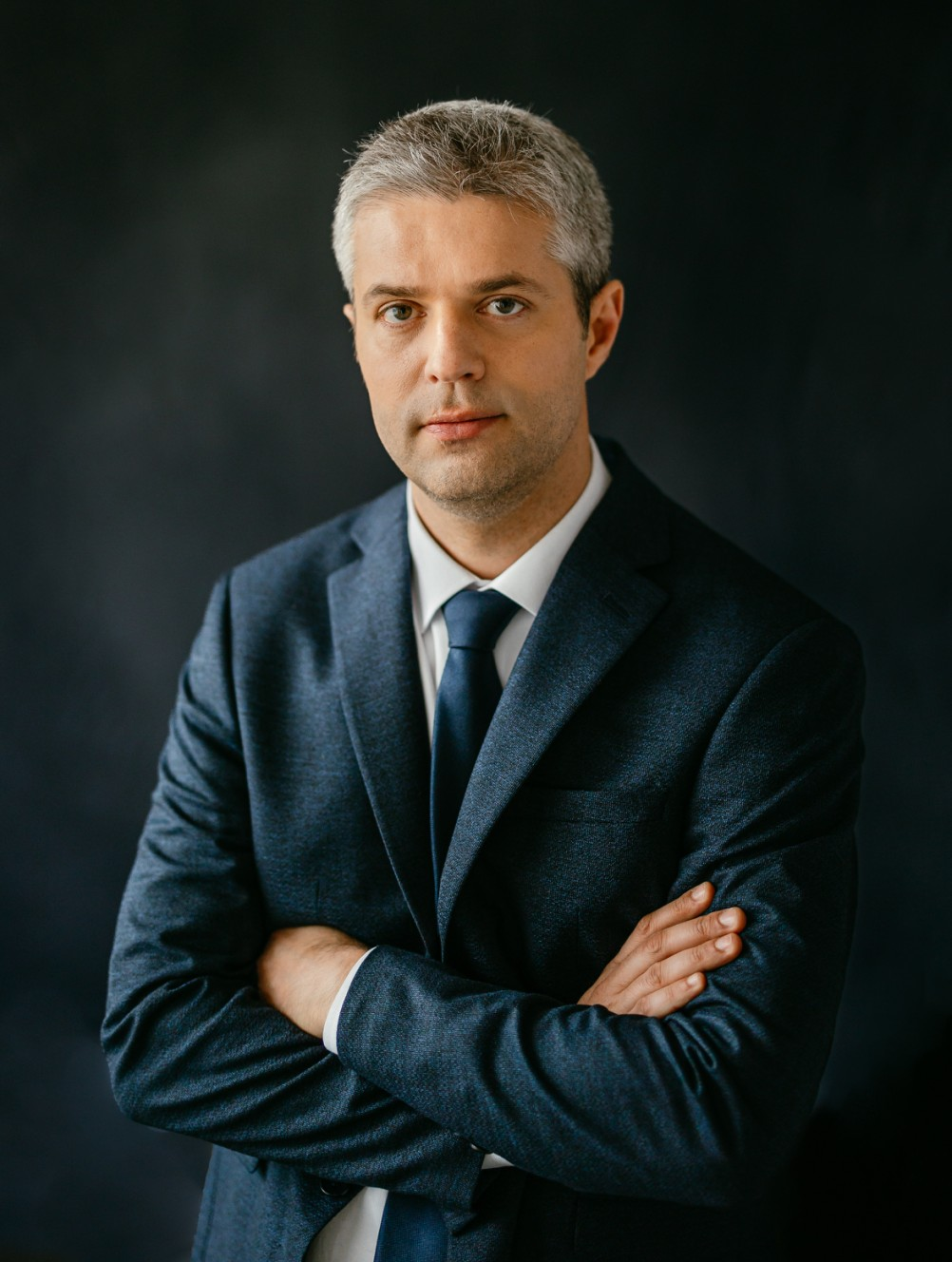

50th Mayor of Varna
- Incumbent
- Assumed office 13 November 2023
- Preceded by: Ivan Portnih

District governor of Varna
- In office 24 February 2022 – 4 August 2022
- Appointed by: Kiril Petkov
- Preceded by: Mario Smurkov
- Succeeded by: Mario Smurkov

Personal details
- Born: 22 March 1978 (age 48) Varna, PR Bulgaria
- Party: We Continue the Change
- Children: 2
- Education: American University (BBA); City, University of London (MFin)

Blagomir Rubinov Kotsev (born 22 March 1978) is a Bulgarian economist, entrepreneur and politician. He has been serving as the 50th Mayor of Varna since November 13, 2023.

== Early life and education ==
Blagomir Kotsev was born on 22 March 1978 in Varna. In 1997 he graduated from the First Language School in Varna with English proficiency. In the period up to 2004, he successively graduated with honors as a Bachelor of Business Administration from American University in the US capital Washington, D.C. and obtained a Master's degree in Shipping, Commerce and Finance from City, University of London. 7 years later he chose to return to Bulgaria.

== Political career ==
=== District governor (2022) ===
By the nomination of We Continue the Change, Kotsev was appointed on February 24, 2022, by the Petkov Government to serve as District governor of the Varna Province.
Upon his inauguration, the Russian invasion of Ukraine started and a solution for the incoming refugees, mostly women and children, was needed. After the first week of the war more than 500 people in the Varna Province had been accommodated in hotels and private homes. Kotsev further assisted both the refugees and the hotel owners to get assistance from the Bulgarian government.
As governor, he issued an order stopping vehicular traffic on the coastal alley in Varna. His decision was widely welcomed by citizens, but met resistance from some restaurant owners who attacked his order and took it to court. However, its appropriateness was accepted by the judges.
Kotsev later blocked the municipality's decision to sell off dozens of public areas to private individuals and companies instead of using them to create public green spaces, gardens and sports facilities. He criticized the destruction of the cultural and historical buildings in the city centre of Varna and the parking problems in the city.
After the successful vote of no confidence against the Petkov Government, the new caretaker Donev Government replaced Kotsev with his predecessor, marking an end to his rather short governance of the Varna Province.

=== Parliamentary elections (2022-2023) ===
A snap parliamentary election was called in Bulgaria on October 2, 2022, due to the successful vote of no confidence against the Petkov Government earlier in the year. Kotsev was included among the candidates of We Continue the Change. The results revealed his failure to obtain a seat in the National Assembly. After the political parties in the 48th National Assembly failed to form a government, another snap parliamentary election was called on April 2, 2023. We Continue the Change entered the election as part of the PP-DB electoral alliance and Kotsev was once again among the candidates. He did, however, miss out on a seat in the National Assembly again.

=== Mayoral election (2023) ===
As the 2023 Bulgarian local elections approached, the PP-DB electoral alliance nominated Kotsev as their candidate for Mayor of Varna. His campaign heavily focused on criticizing the governing policies for the past 12 years in Varna of the GERB political party.
The election took place on October 29 and Kotsev received 21,56% of the votes, finishing second behind incumbent Mayor Ivan Portnih with 26,57%, which meant a second round of the election the following week with a contest between the two. Kotsev won the election on November 5 with 53,06% of the votes.

=== Mayor of Varna (2023 - present) ===
Kotsev was sworn in as Mayor of Varna on November 13, 2023.

=== Arrest and criminal case ===
Kotsev was arrested on July 8, 2025 after a tip-off alleging corruption from a failed public procurement tenderer, and charged with participating in an organized criminal group involved in abuse of office, bribery, and money laundering. Courts repeatedly denied his release during the pre-trial phase, prompting large protests in Varna and Sofia and accusations from his party that the case was politically motivated. An indictment was filed on 13 November 2025, and on 19 November the Supreme Court of Cassation transferred jurisdiction to Varna Regional Court, which released Kotsev on 27 November on 200,000 BGN bail — after nearly six months in custody — a sum his party's affiliated European Parliament group, Renew Europe, called part of a pattern showing "how urgently the misuse of pre-trial detention must end." Proceedings, which had been paused in March, were subsequently reopened by the Varna District Court after two co-defendants' unsuccessful parliamentary candidacies removed the grounds for suspension.
