= Georgi Kostov =

Bulgarian composer and politician (1941–2024)

- Георги Костов

Minister of Culture
- In office 25 January 1995 – 10 June 1996
- Preceded by: Ivaylo Znepolski
- Succeeded by: Ivan Marazov

Member of the National Assembly of Bulgaria
- In office 12 January 1995 – 13 February 1997

Personal details
- Born: Georgi Georgiev Kostov; 21 January 1941 Sofia, Bulgaria
- Died: 19 January 2024 (aged 82) Sofia, Bulgaria
- Party: BSP
- Education: National Academy of Music
- Occupation: Composer

Georgi Georgiev Kostov (Bulgarian: Георги Георгиев Костов; 21 January 1941 – 19 January 2024) was a Bulgarian composer and politician. A member of the Bulgarian Socialist Party, he served in the National Assembly from 1995 to 1997 and was Minister of Culture from 1995 to 1996.

Kostov died in Sofia on 19 January 2024, at the age of 82.
