= Slavcho Atanasov =

Bulgarian politician

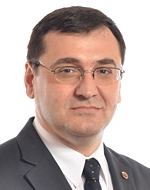
- Born: 14 February 1968 (age 58); Karlovo
- Occupation: Politician

Slavcho Atanasov (Bulgarian: Славчо Атанасов; born 14 February 1968 in Karlovo) is a Bulgarian politician, member of IMRO-BNM and mayor of Plovdiv (2007–2011).

In 2003 he was elected a mayor of Plovdiv's largest district Trakiya.

During the local elections in 2007 Slavcho Atanasov was a nominee for a mayor of Plovdiv in the list of IMRO-BNM supported by GERB and other right formations. In the elections on 28 October he won in the first round with 53%.
