= Vidin Synagogue =

Former synagogue in Vidin, Bulgaria

- Bulgarian: Видинска синагога, romanized: Vidinska sinagoga
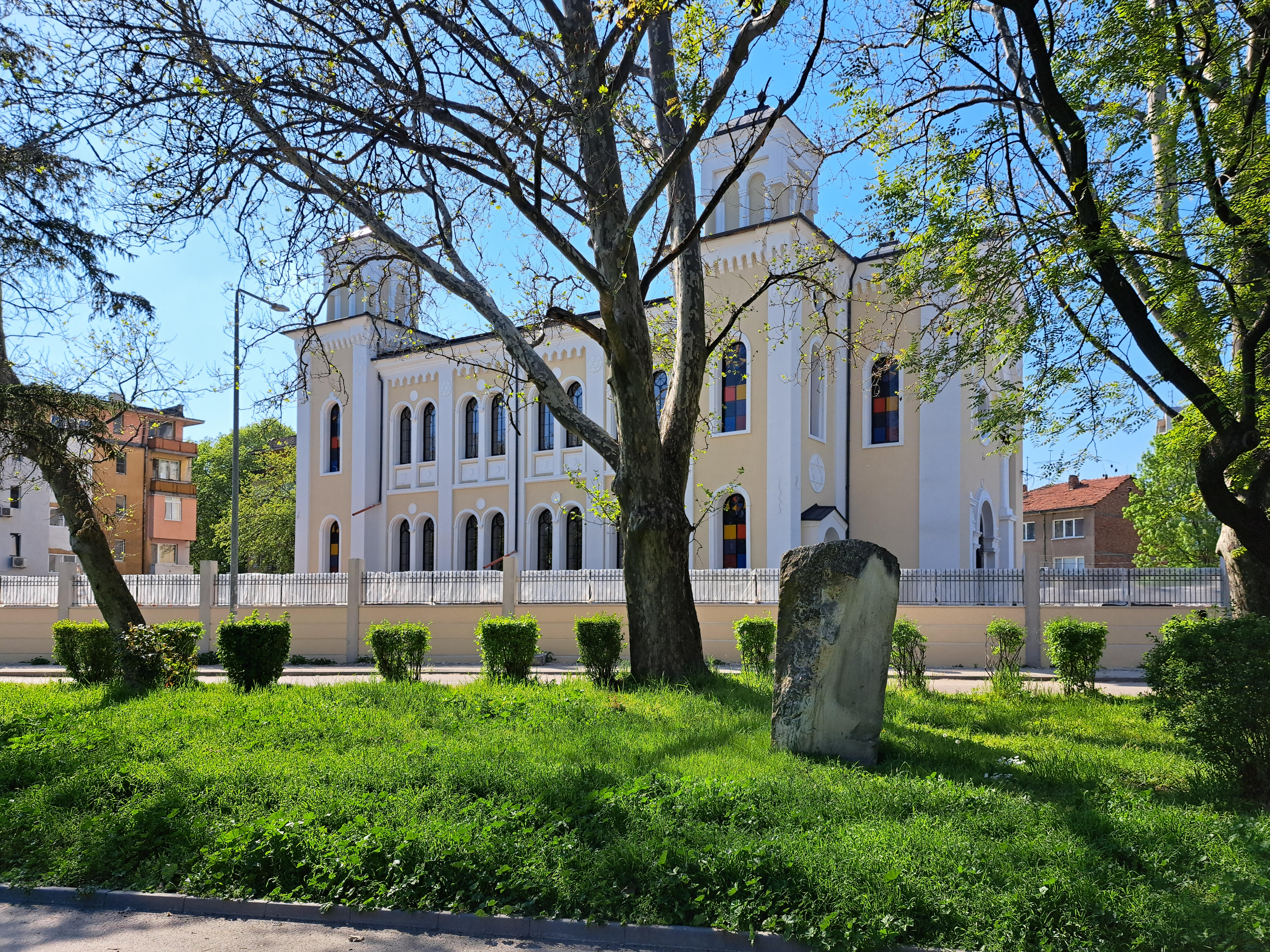
- The reconstructed former synagogue in 2023, repurposed as the Jules Pascin Cultural Centre

- Location of the ruins of the former synagogue in Bulgaria

Religion
- Affiliation: Orthodox Judaism (former)
- Rite: Nusach Sefard
- Ecclesiastical or organizational status: Synagogue (1894–c. 1944); Cultural center (since 2023)
- Ownership: Municipality of Vidin
- Year consecrated: 28 September 1894
- Status: Inactive (as a synagogue); Repurposed

Location
- Location: Baba Vida Street, Vidin
- Country: Bulgaria
- Interactive map of Vidin Synagogue
- Coordinates: 43°59′29″N 22°53′2″E

Architecture
- Architect: V. Kitov
- Type: Synagogue architecture
- Style: Romanesque Revival; Rundbogenstil
- Groundbreaking: 1890
- Completed: 1894

Specifications
- Direction of façade: North-east
- Capacity: 1,000 worshipers
- Length: 36.5 metres (120 ft)
- Width: 22 m (72 ft)
- Height (max): 21 m (69 ft)
- Dome: Four
- Dome height (inner): 11 m (36 ft)
- Spire: Four
- Materials: Brick

Website
- www.cc-pascin-vidin.eu

The Vidin Synagogue (Bulgarian: Видинска синагога, romanized: Vidinska sinagoga) is a former Orthodox Jewish congregation and synagogue, whose ruins are located at Baba Vida Street, in Vidin, in northwest Bulgaria. Designed in the Romanesque Revival and Rundbogenstil styles, the former synagogue was completed in 1894.

A national monument of culture in Vidin, the former Sephardic synagogue is situated in the Kaleto neighbourhood next to the Baba Vida castle and the banks of the Danube. It was the second-largest synagogue in Bulgaria after the Sofia Synagogue.

The building was desecrated during World War II, was in ruins for approximately forty years, subsequently restored, and was repurposed as the Jules Pascin Cultural Centre, named in honour of painter Jules Pascin, that opened in September 2023.

== History ==
Prior to construction of the current building, an old synagogue existed on the site, constructed with the support of Yakov Jacob Gattegno, a noble. The synagogue was destroyed in 1789 and rebuilt in 1839, with the support of Raphael Ashkenazi, and this building was again devastated by artillery fire during the Russo-Turkish War.

The foundations of the new, current synagogue were laid in 1890 and its construction was funded by merchants from the local Jewish community. The synagogue was consecrated on 28 September 1894 by Chief Rabbi of Bulgaria, Dr. Moritz Grünwald. This building was used as a house of prayer, accommodating up to 1,000 worshipers, until World War II, where it was again desecrated. After the aliyah of the Vidin Jews in the 1950s, the former synagogue was left derelict and then was used for profane purposes. An earthquake in 1976 further damaged the building and it lay in a ruinous state.

The Bulgarian government initiated its reconstruction as a concert hall in 1983. However, the project was abandoned with the fall of the communist regime in 1989, leaving the synagogue without a roof.

The former synagogue was added to the World Monuments Watch in 2004. In 2017, the Bulgarian Jewish community transferred ownership to the Municipality of Vidin and in May 2021, ground was broken for the synagogue's full reconstruction using EU and national funds. On 4 September 2023, the former synagogue reopened as a museum and multi-purpose cultural centre dedicated to the Vidin-born Jewish painter Jules Pascin (1885–1930). The opening ceremony was attended by Bulgarian president Rumen Radev.

== Architecture ==
The synagogue was designed by V. Kitov in an eclectic style featuring a large façade arch and four corner towers, as inspired by the Dohány Street Synagogue in Budapest. Its architecture combines Jugendstil, Romantic Revival, and Neoclassical influences. The altar was built by Vidin-based Czech sculptor Max Werich. Lighting was delivered from Vienna and timber was sourced from Transylvania and Hungary. The synagogue measures 36.50 by 22 m (119.8 by 72.2 ft), with a maximum height of 21 m (69 ft).

== Gallery ==
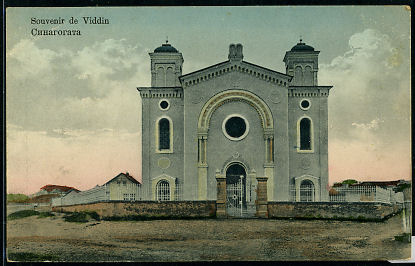
An early postcard of the former synagogue, undated

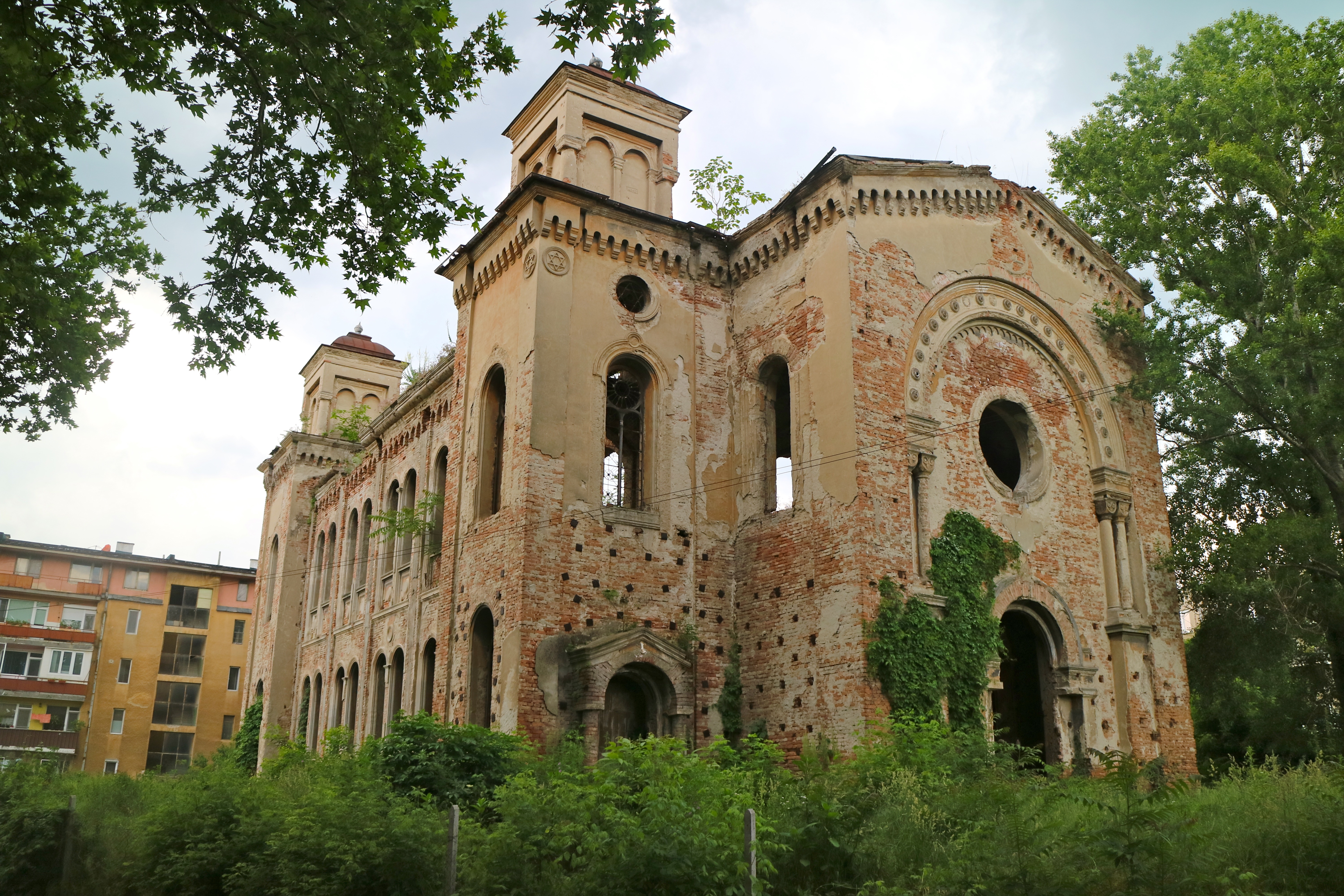
The abandoned former synagogue, in 2016

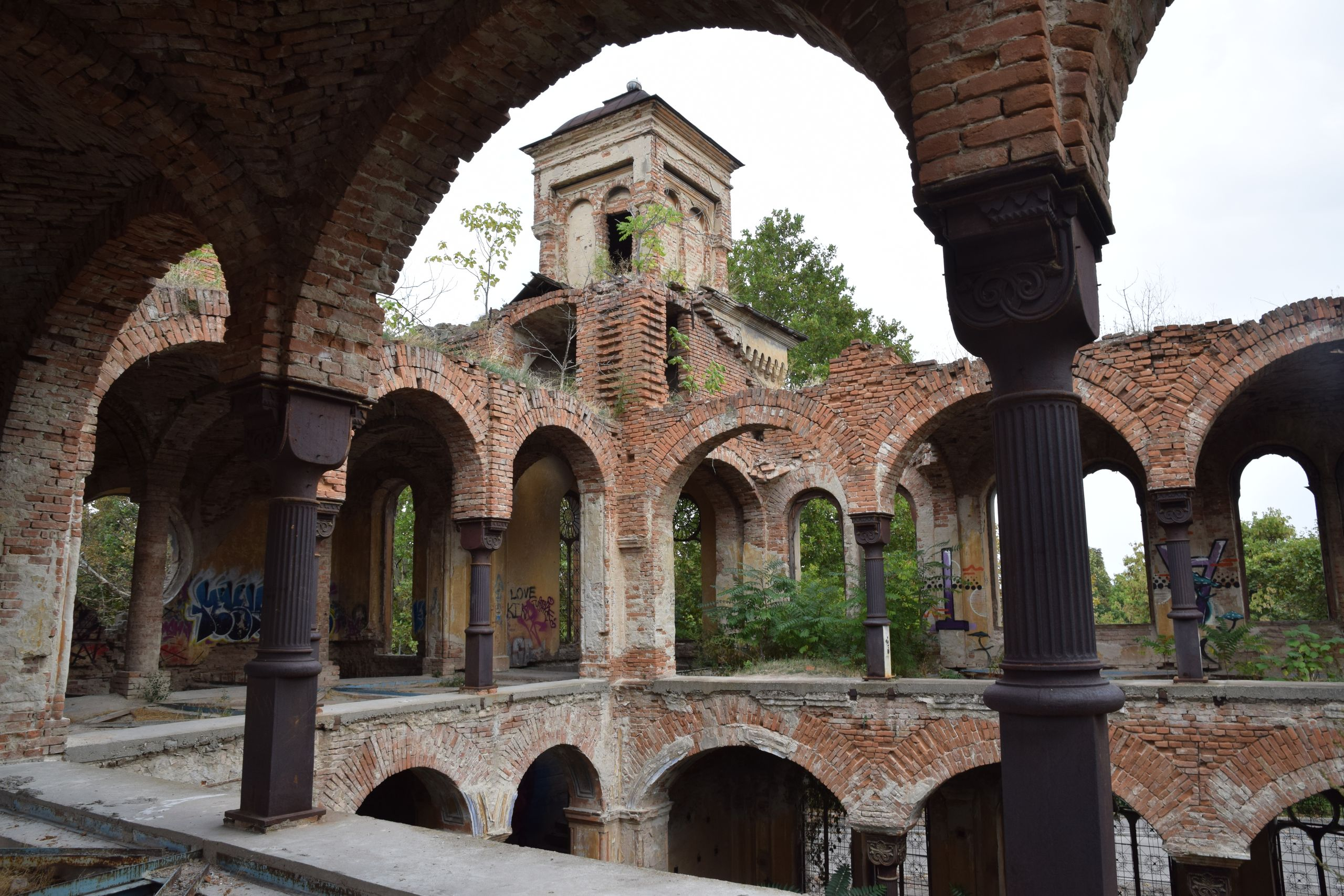
Synagogue interior ruins, in 2016

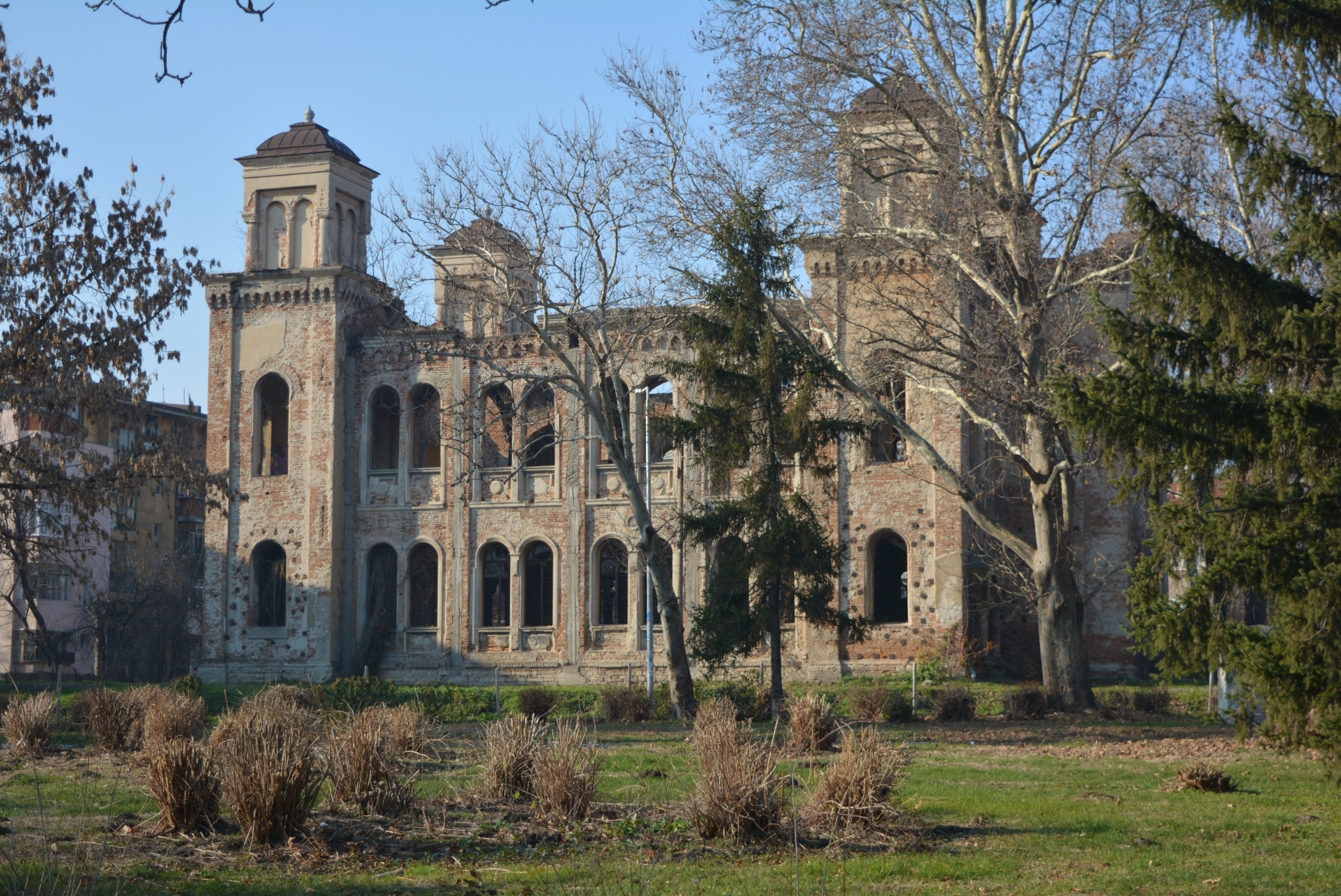
Synagogue ruins, in 2017

== See also ==
- History of the Jews in Bulgaria
- List of synagogues in Bulgaria
