= Plovdiv Synagogue =

Synagogue in Plovdiv, Bulgaria

Zion Plovdiv Synagogue
- Bulgarian: Паметник за спасение на пловдивските евреи Шофар
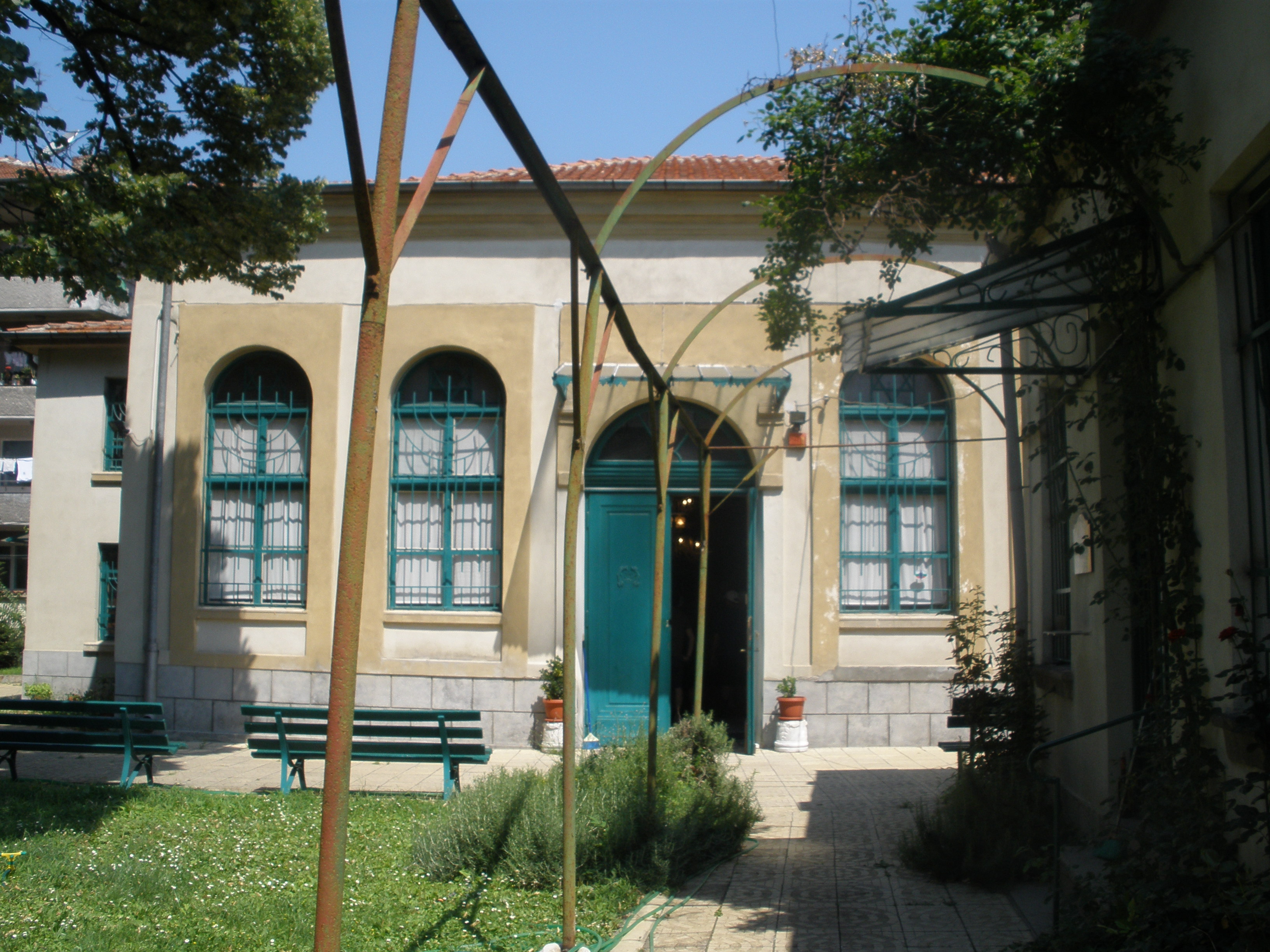
- The synagogue in 2010

- Location of the synagogue in Bulgaria

Religion
- Affiliation: Judaism
- Rite: Romaniote; Nusach Sefard
- Ecclesiastical or organisational status: Synagogue
- Status: Active

Location
- Location: Tsar Kaloyan Street 13, Plovdiv
- Country: Bulgaria
- Coordinates: 42°9′2″N 24°44′27″E

Architecture
- Type: Synagogue architecture
- Style: Ottoman-style Balkan
- Established: c. 1710 (as a congregation)
- Completed: 1892

Specifications
- Length: 12 metres (39 ft)
- Width: 12 metres (39 ft)
- Dome: One
- Materials: Brick

The Plovdiv Synagogue, officially the Zion Plovdiv Synagogue (Bulgarian: Паметник за спасение на пловдивските евреи Шофар, lit. 'Shofar for the salvation of Plovdiv Jews'), is a Romaniote Jewish congregation and synagogue, located in the city of Plovdiv, Bulgaria. Built in 1892, the synagogue is one of the two active remaining synagogues in Bulgaria. The congregation worships in the Sephardi rite.

== History ==
According to the archaeological research, a synagogue was constructed in ancient Philippopolis dating from the reign of Emperor Alexander Severus in the first half of 3rd century AD. It was followed by several renovations, the last one – from the beginning of 5th century (M. Martinova). In 1360, when the city was conquered by the Turks, certain Jews who emigrated from Aragon in 1492 settled in Philippopolis and built a synagogue called "K. K. Aragon," which was standing in 1540, but is no longer in existence.

In 1892 following the Bulgarian liberation from Ottoman domination in 1878, one of the first synagogues to be erected was the (Zion) Synagogue in Plovdiv. It was built in the remnants of a small courtyard in what was once a large Jewish quarter called Orta Mezar during the Turkish rule. The location of the Sephardic synagogue is now called Tsar Kaloyan Street 13. The synagogue is one of the best surviving examples of the Ottoman-style Balkan synagogue.

According to Ruth E. Gruber, the interior is a "hidden treasure…a glorious, if run-down, burst of color." An exquisite Venetian glass chandelier hangs from the center of the ceiling, which has a richly painted dome. All surfaces are covered in elaborate, Moorish-style, geometric designs in once-bright greens and blues. Torah scrolls are kept in the gilded Aron-ha-Kodesh.

In 1904 the Jewish community possessed three other synagogues: Jeshurun, built in 1710 according to the inscription on a marble slab in the synagogue; Ahabat-Shalom, built in 1880; Shebeṭ Aḥim or Mafṭirim, founded in 1882 by emigrants from Karlovo, whence the Jews fled during the Turko-Russian war (1877-1878). Before World War II, the Jewish quarter had a population of 7000.

== Legacy ==
Nowadays, the Jewish community in Bulgaria is very small (863 in 1994) because of the Holocaust, secularity of the local Jewish population due to many years of communism and subsequent Aliya (Jewish immigration to Israel).

In 1994 the synagogue was mostly inactive. but the community is undergoing a revival In 2003 the synagogue was restored. The city's mayor, the U.S. and Israeli ambassadors to Bulgaria, were present at its inauguration. The funding for the restoration of the 19th-century Zion Synagogue. was raised by the U.S. Commission for the Preservation of America's Heritage Abroad (US$26,000) and the London-based Hanadiv Charitable Foundation.

The Plovdiv synagogue is open on Friday night services and on High Holidays. Zion synagogue is also available for guests during the day only after a prescheduled visit. The synagogue hosts various events connected with the cultural and educational program of the city.

A permanent exhibition about the Jewish life in the city and the region will soon be created and it will present different objects and stories from the community in Plovdiv and Bulgaria.

== Rabbis ==
The following individuals have served as chief rabbi of the congregation and the city:

Ordinal	Officeholder	Term commenced	Term ended	Time in office	Notes
1	Abraham Sidi	1790	1810	19–20 years	according to Zedner, l.c. p. 397, "Sa'id"
2	Judah Sidi	1810	1812	1–2 years	Brother of the preceding, and author of Ot Emet, on the laws relating to reading the Torah, Salonica, 1799; and of Ner Miẓwah, on Maimonides' Yad and his Sefer ha-Miẓwot, with indexes to the hermeneutic works of Solomon and Israel Jacob Algazi, ib. 1810-11;
3	Abraham ibn Aroglio	1812	1819	6–7 years	
4	Abraham Ventura	1823	1829	5–6 years	
5	Moses ha-Levi	1830	1832	1–2 years	
6	Jacob Finzi	1832	1833	0–1 years	
7	Ḥayyim ibn Aroglio	1833	1857	23–24 years	with Abraham ibn Aroglio, joint author of Mayim ha-Ḥayyim, responsa, Salonica, 1846
8	Moses Behmoiras	1857	1876	18–19 years	Ḥayyim Meborah (1876–92)
9	Ezra Benaroyo	1892			
10	Shmuel Behar				

== Gallery ==
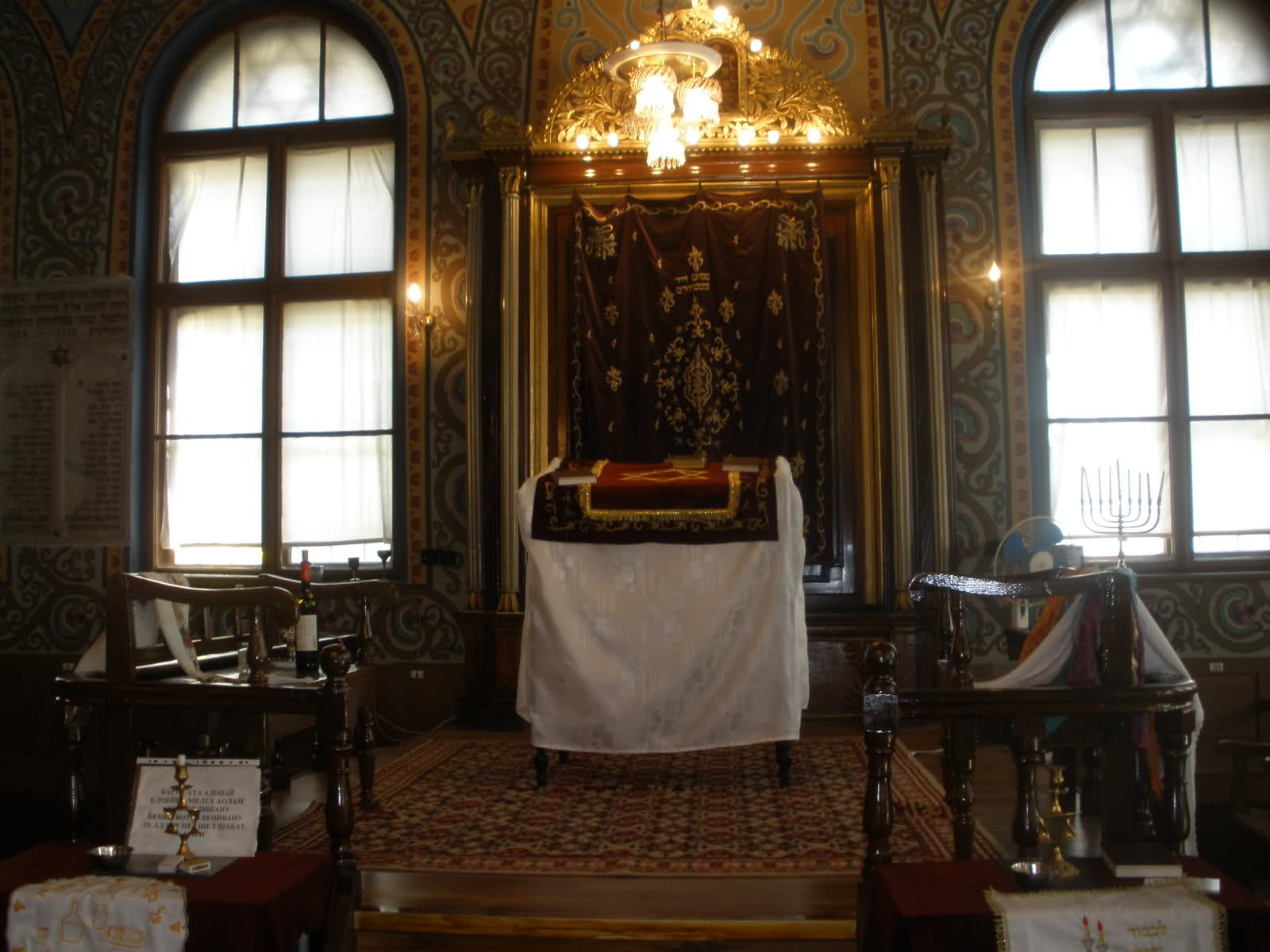

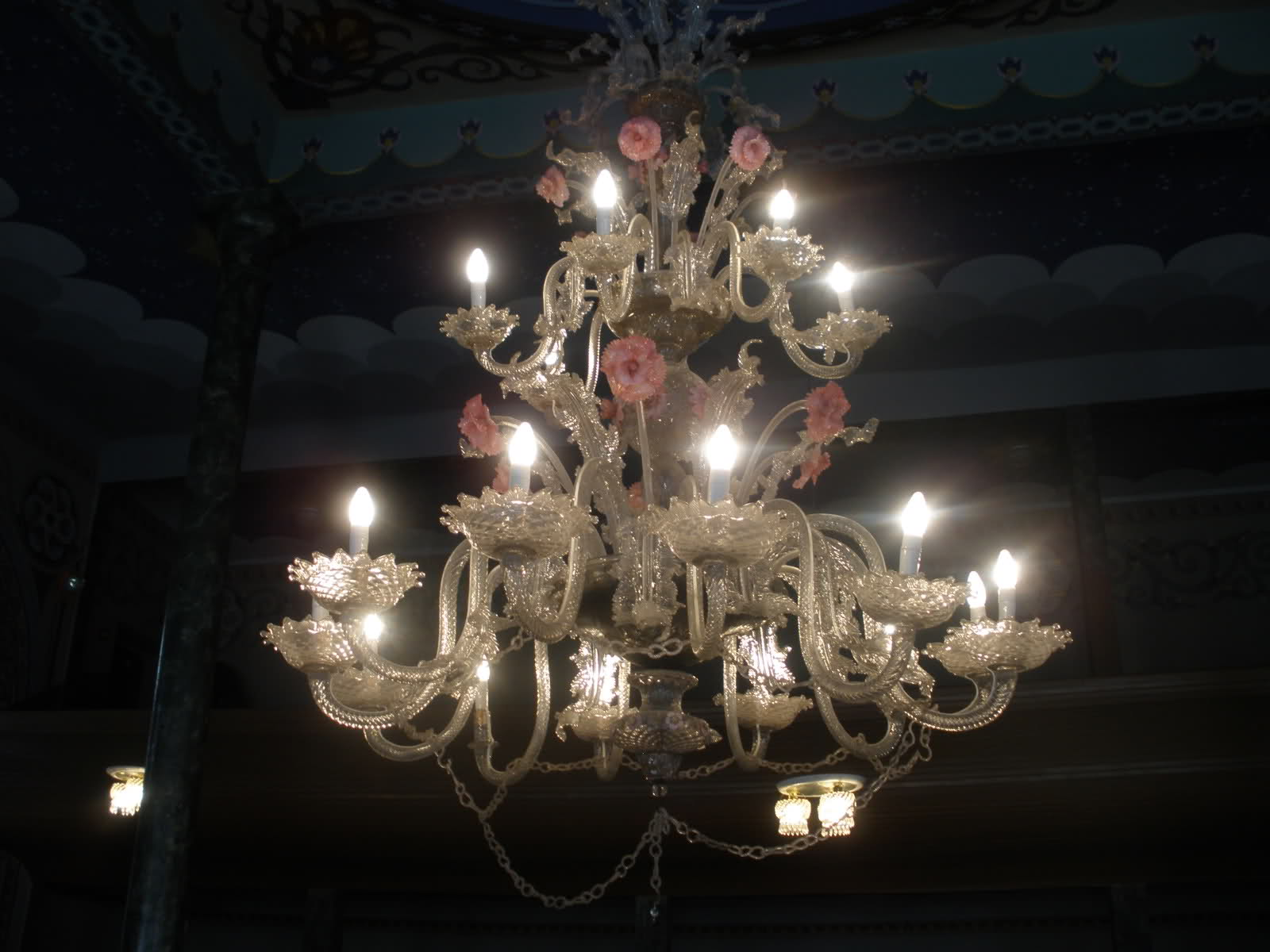

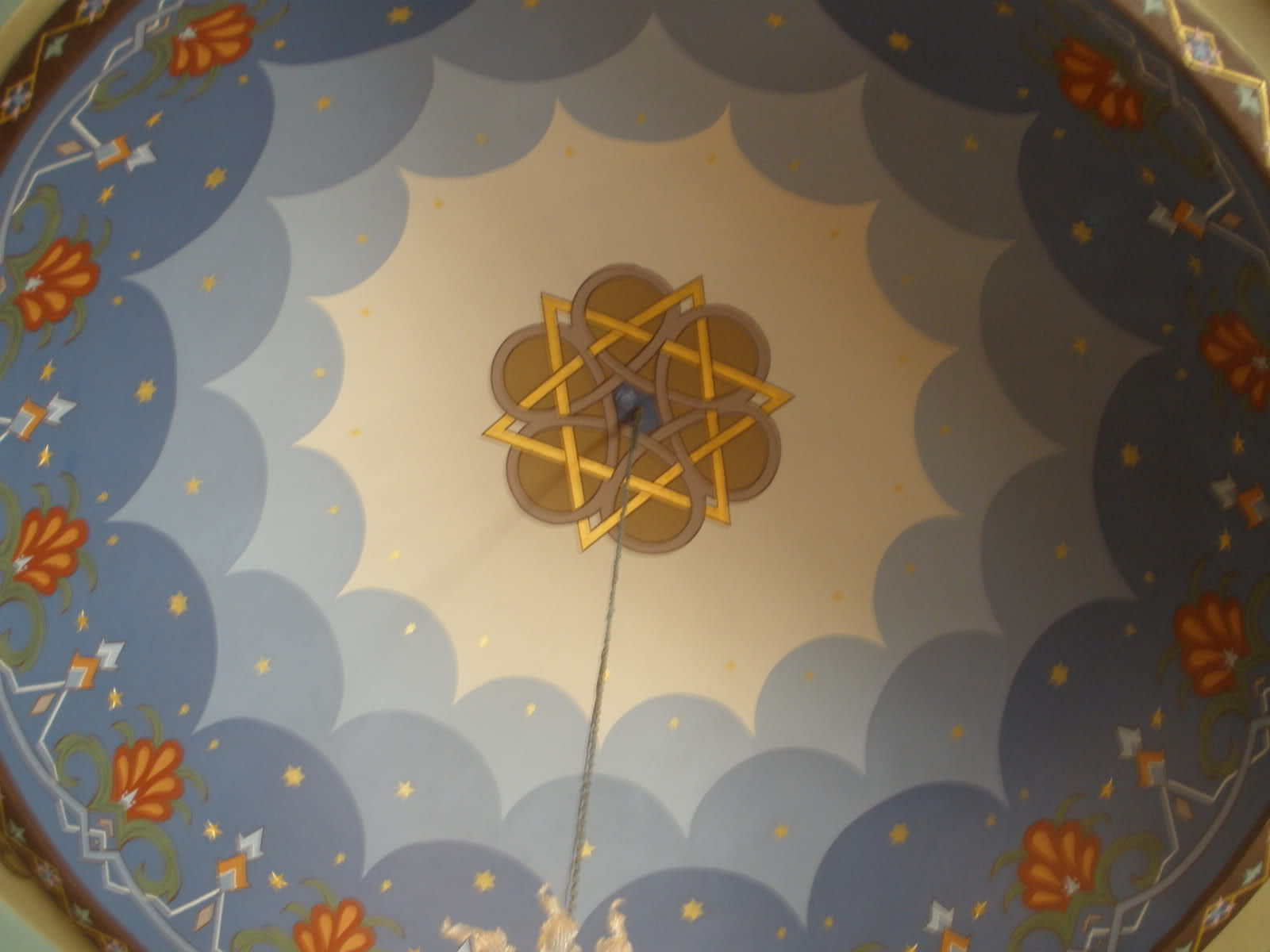
Detail of the dome

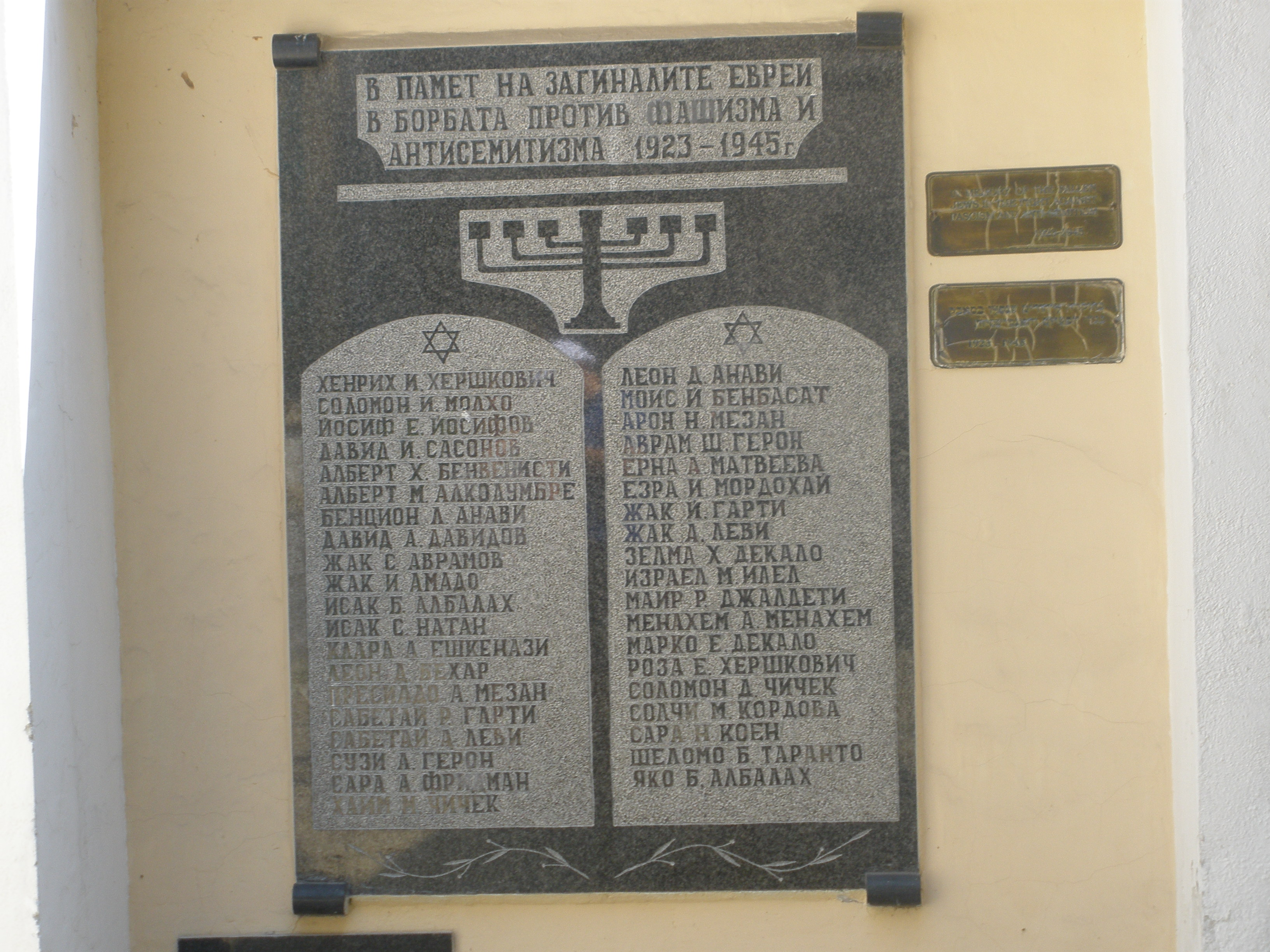

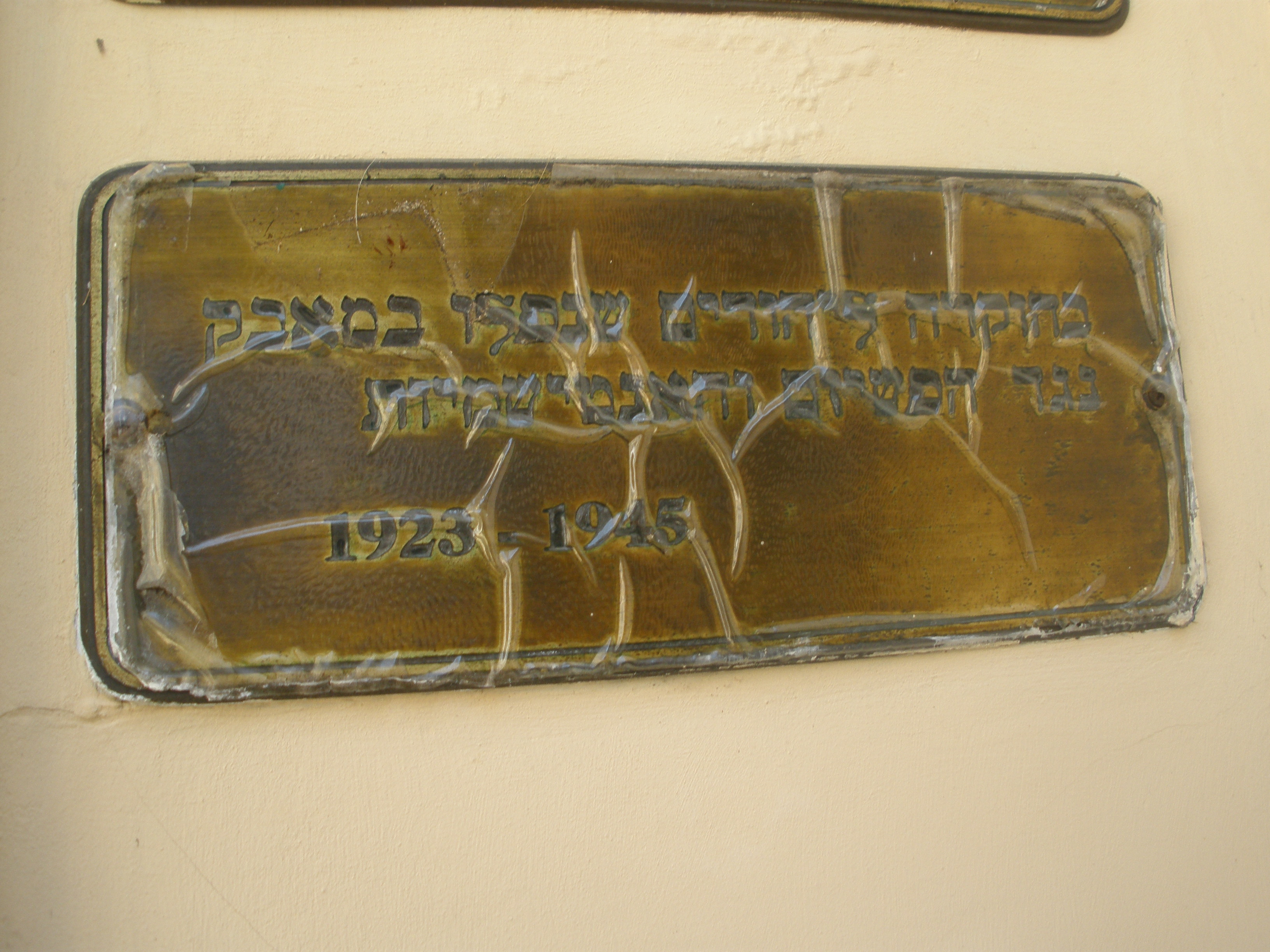

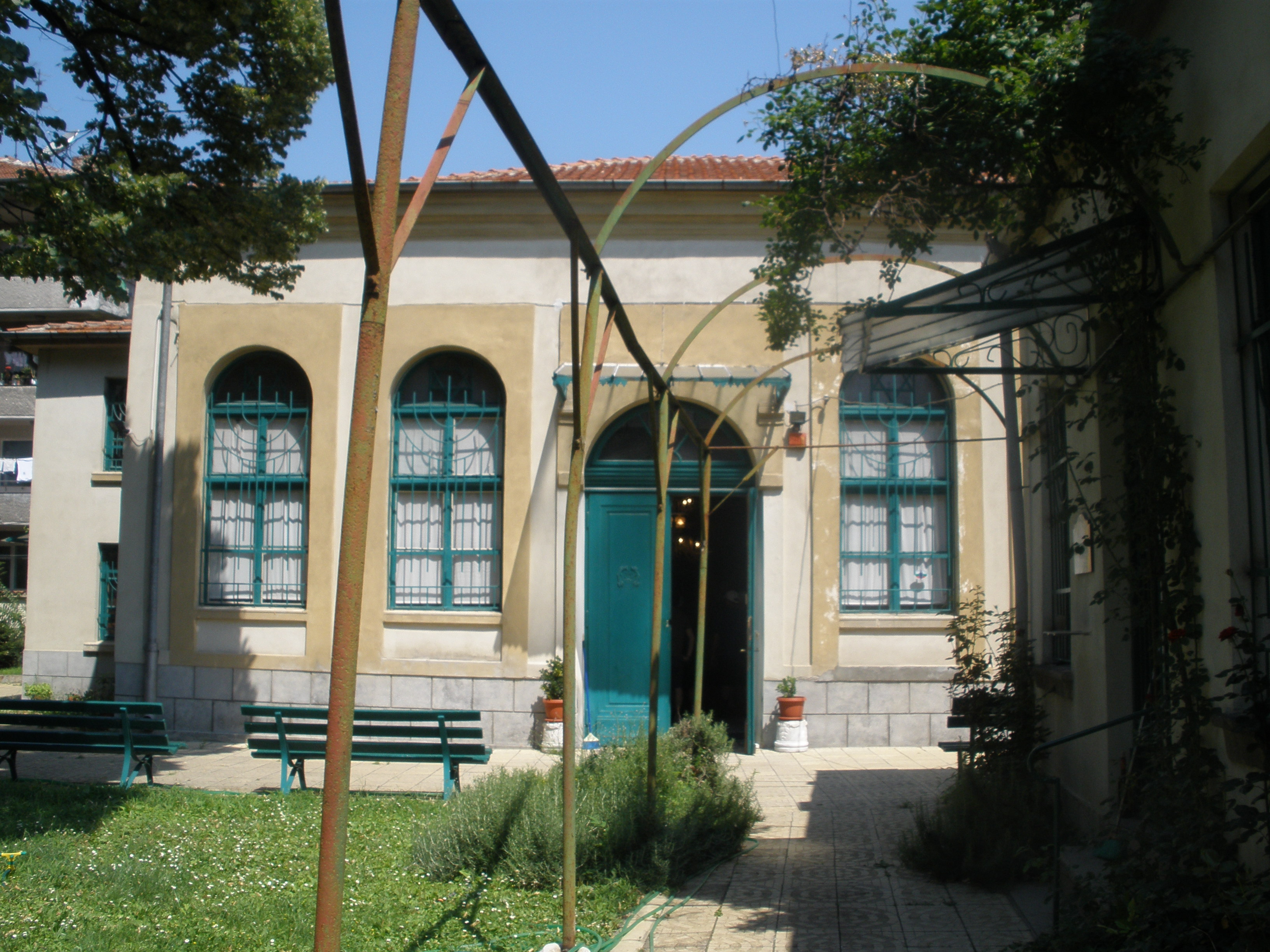

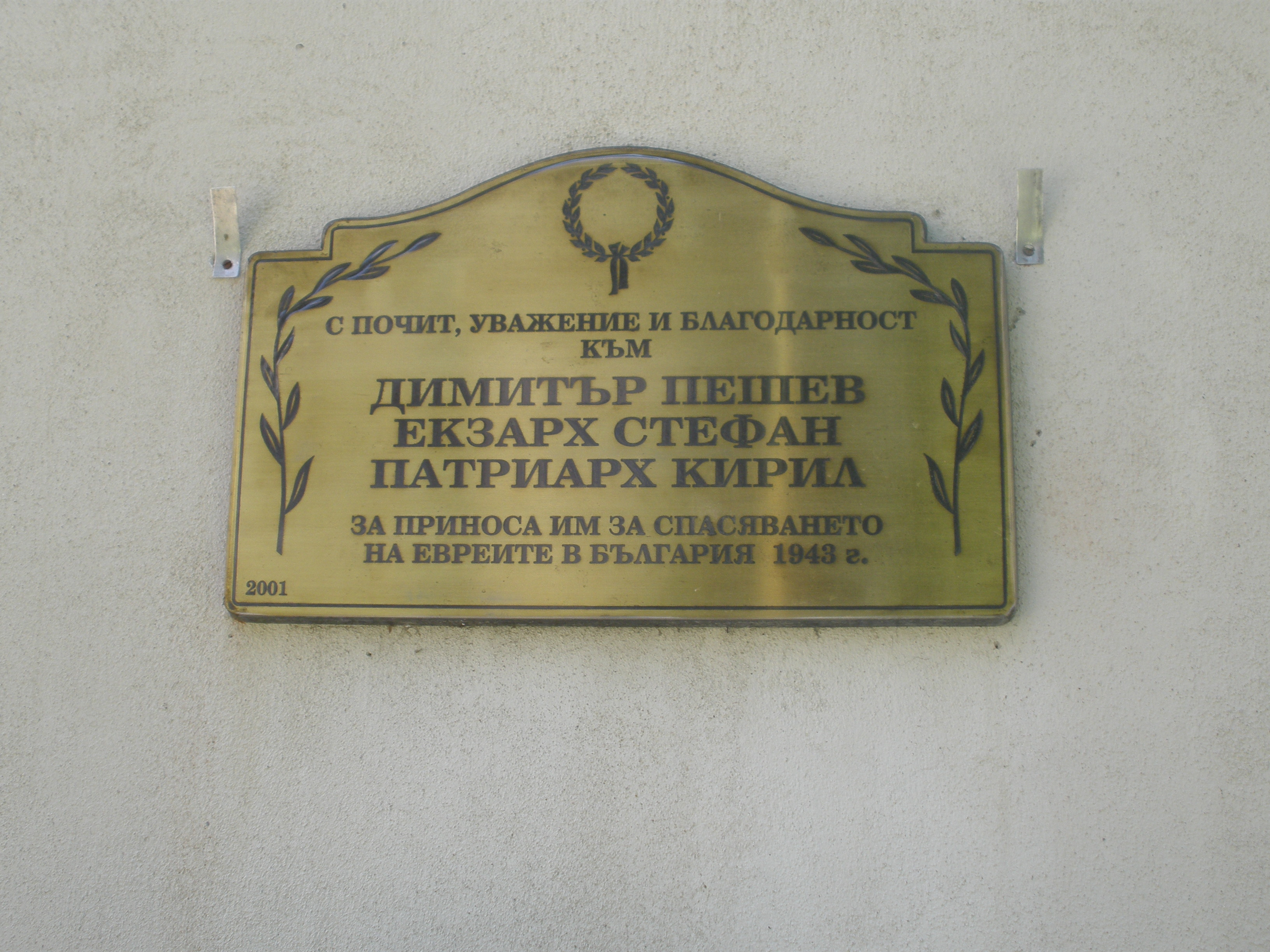

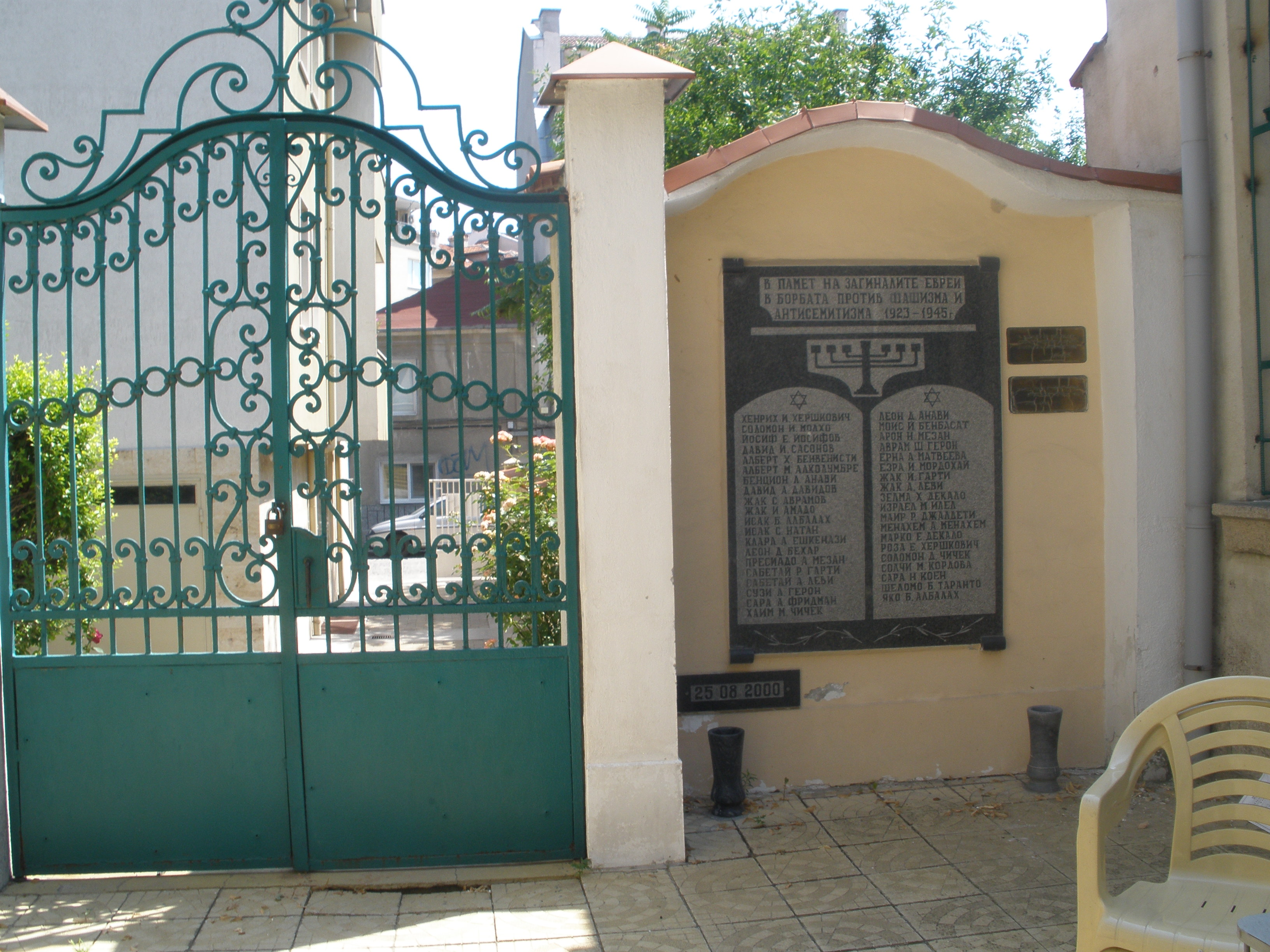

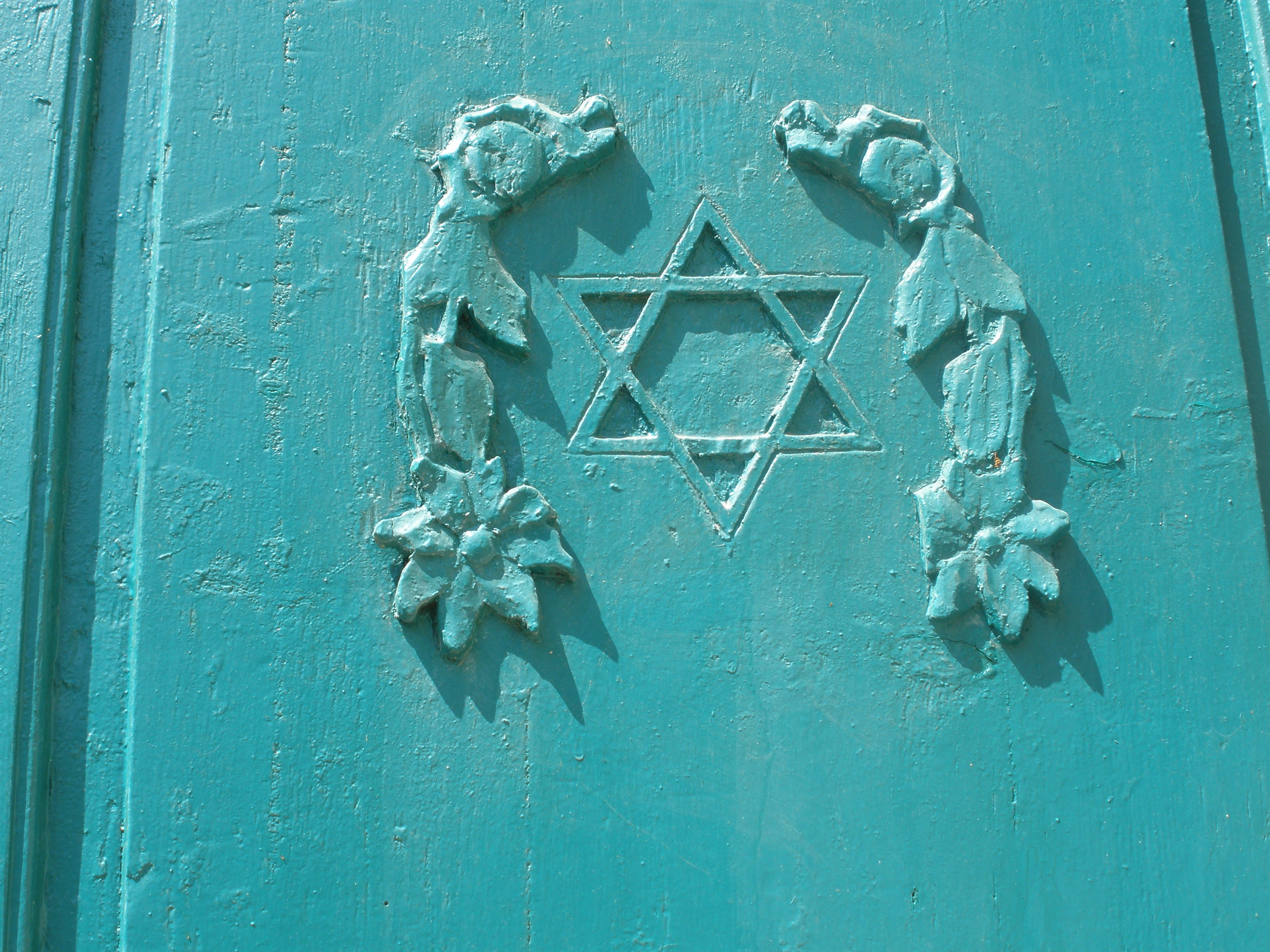

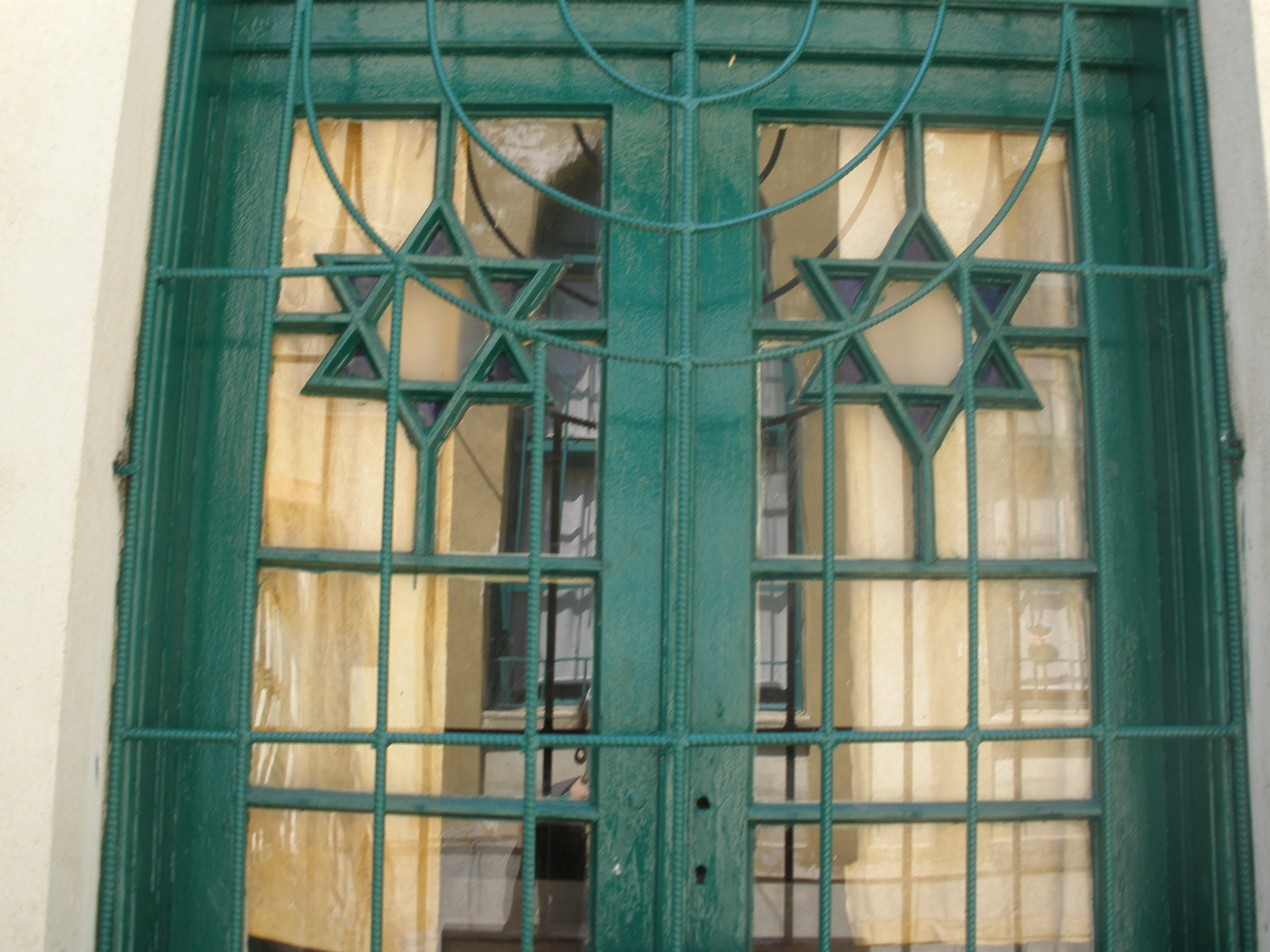

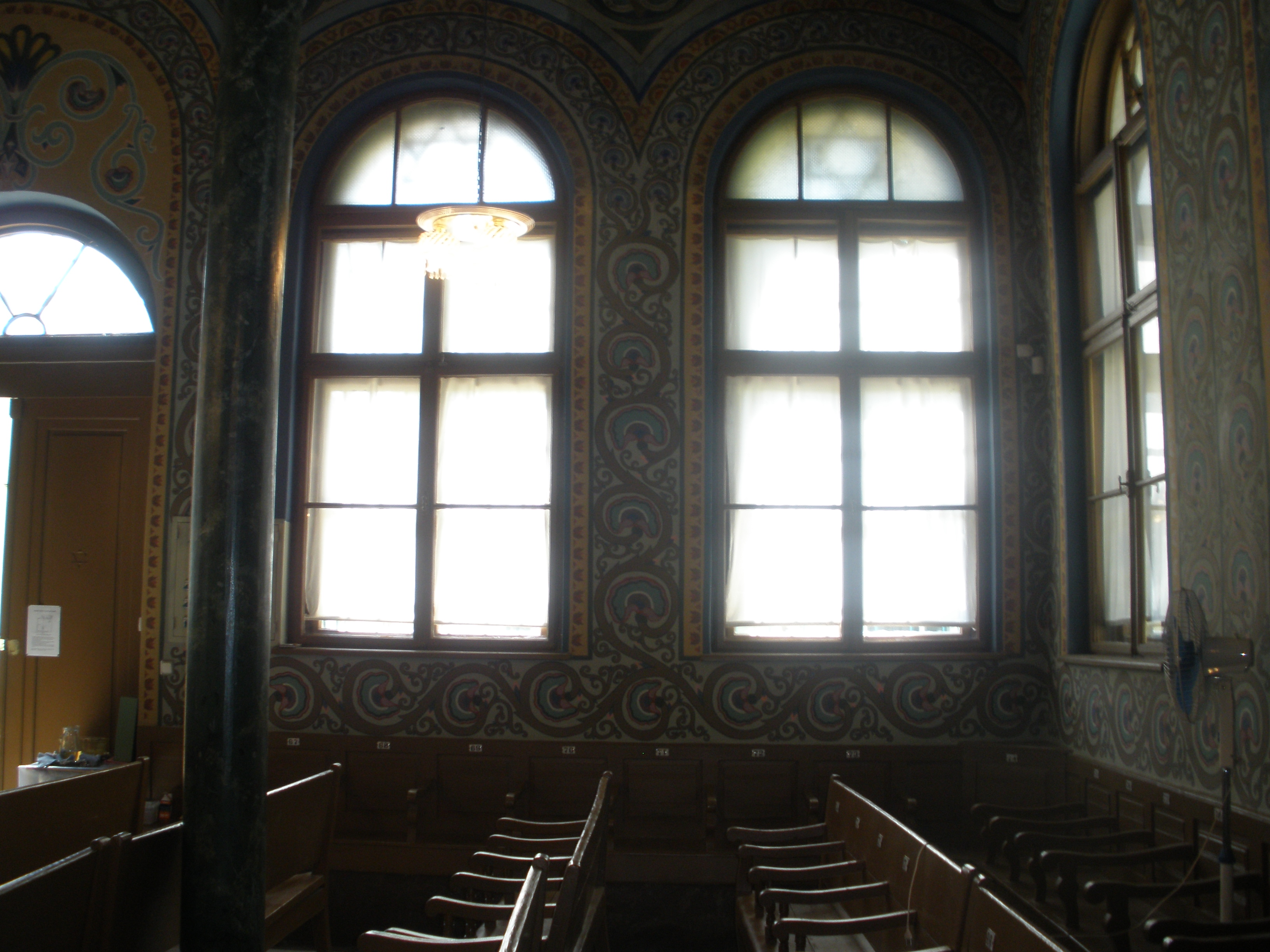

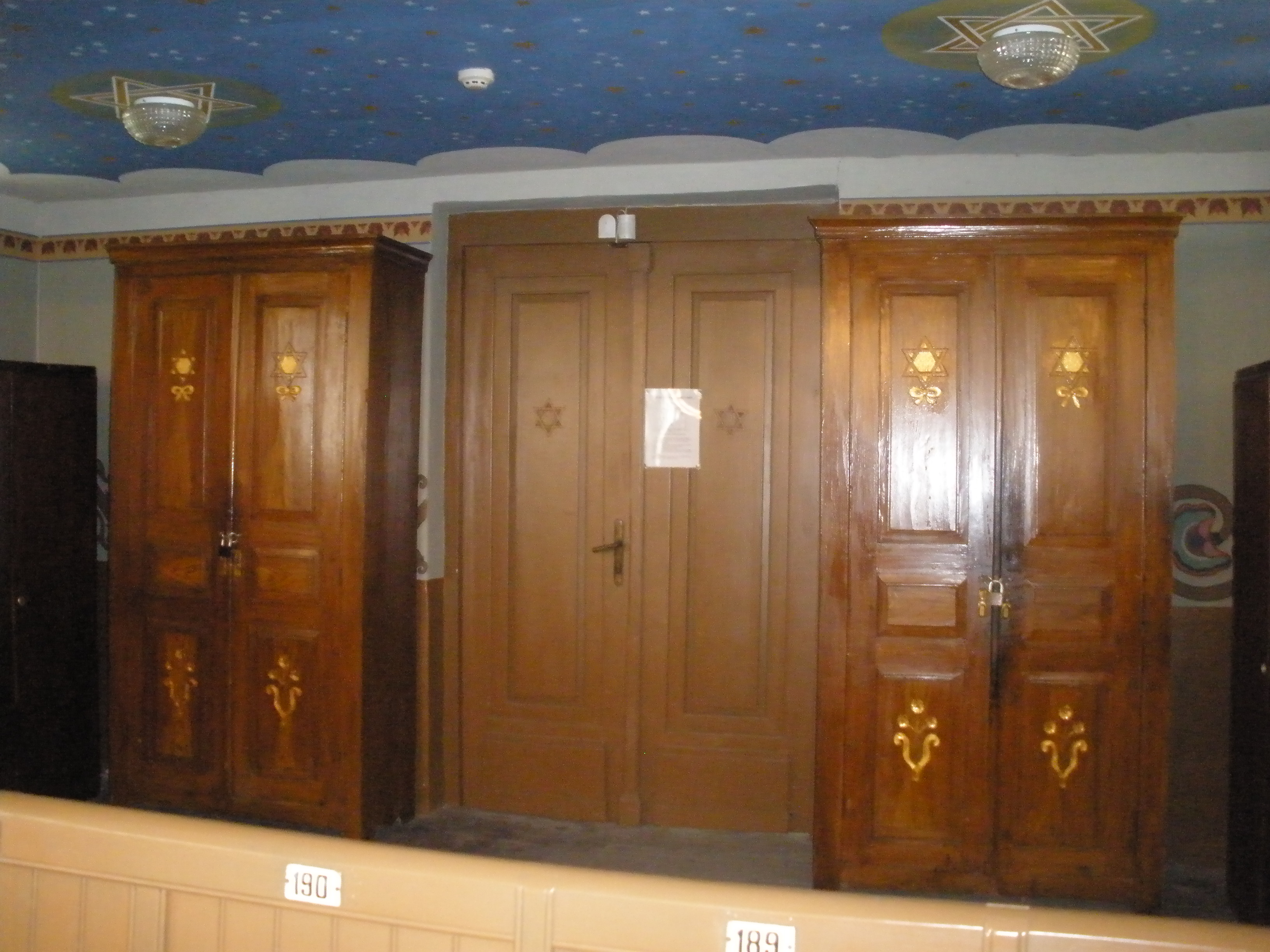

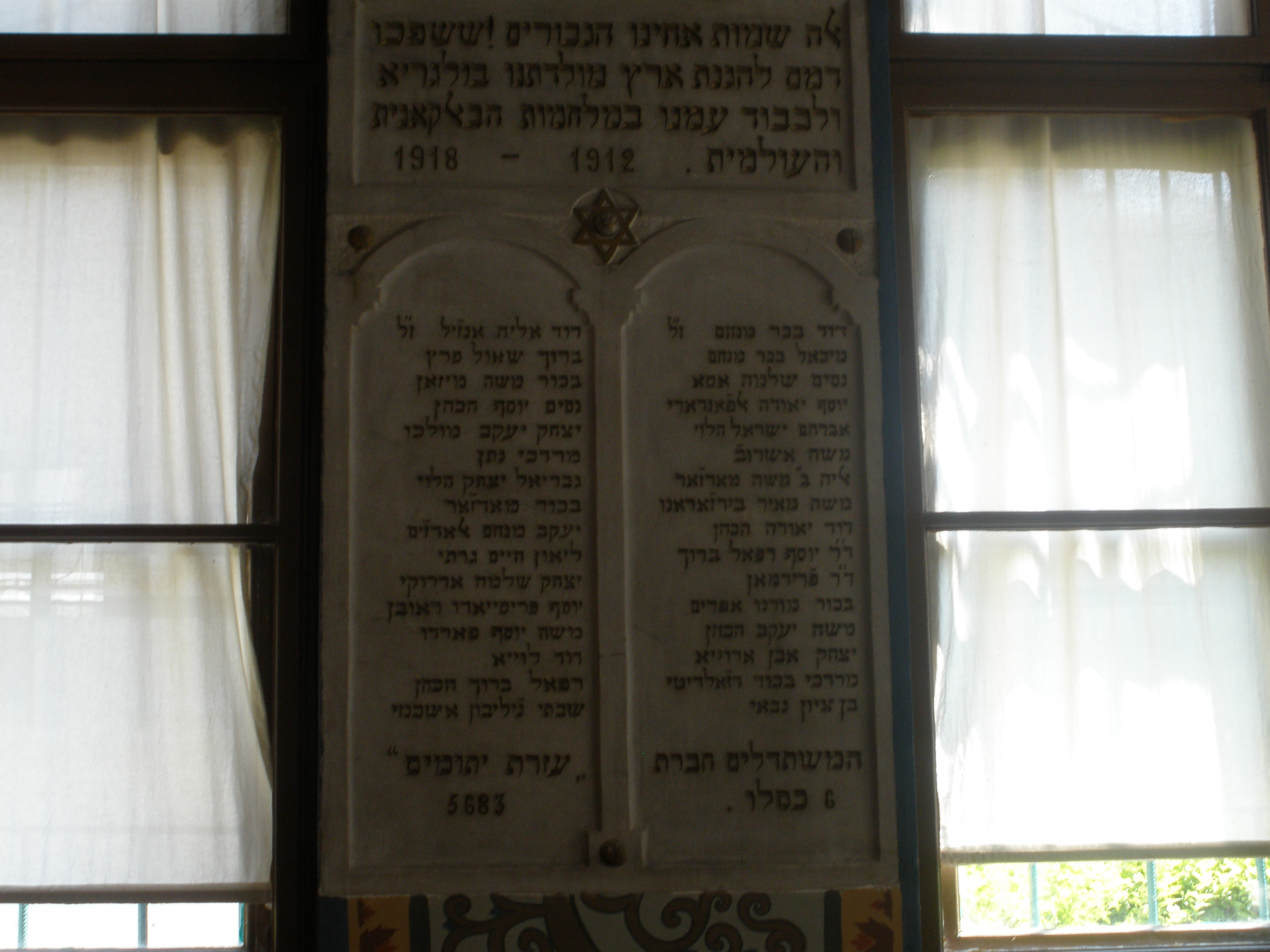

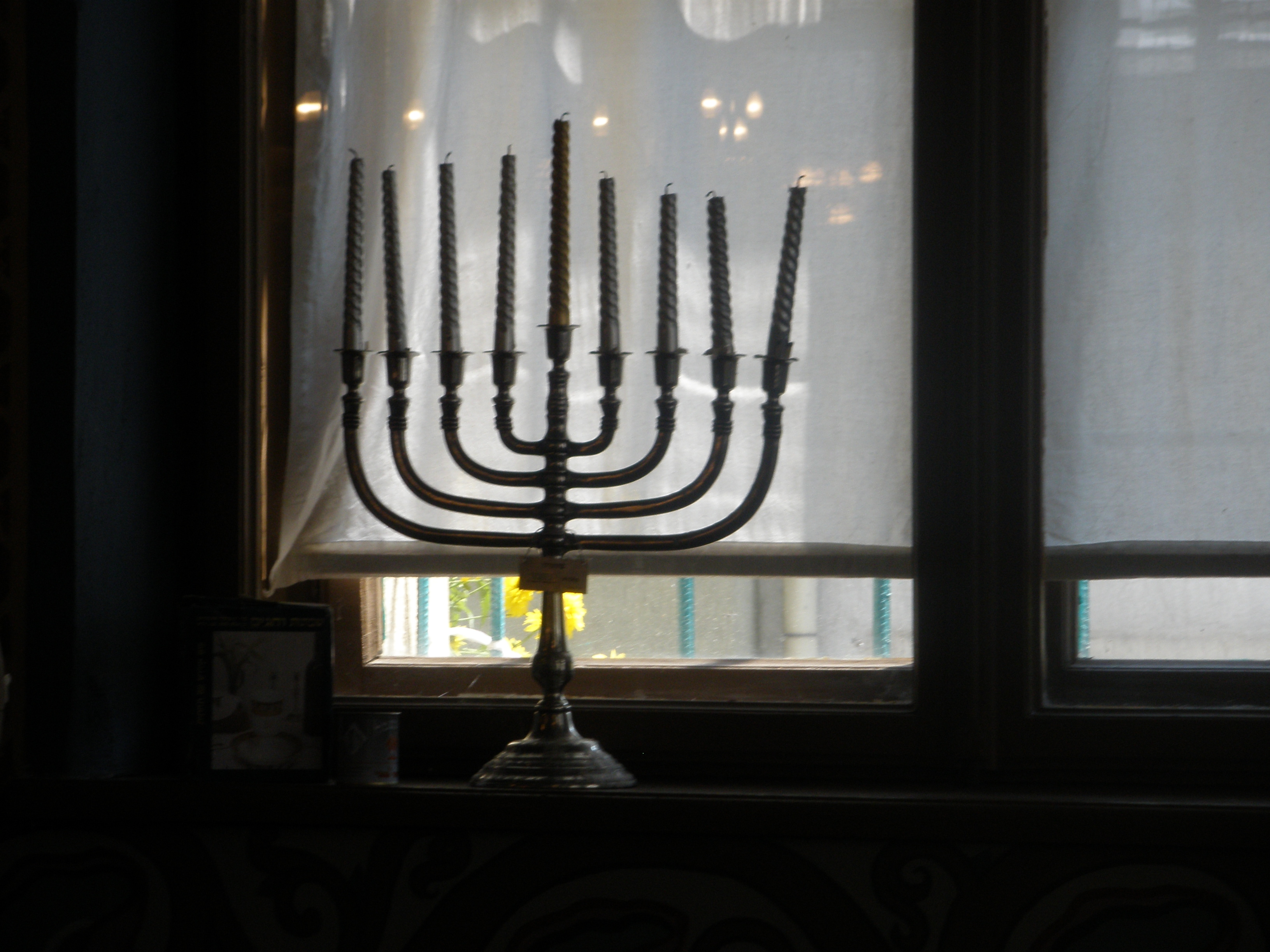

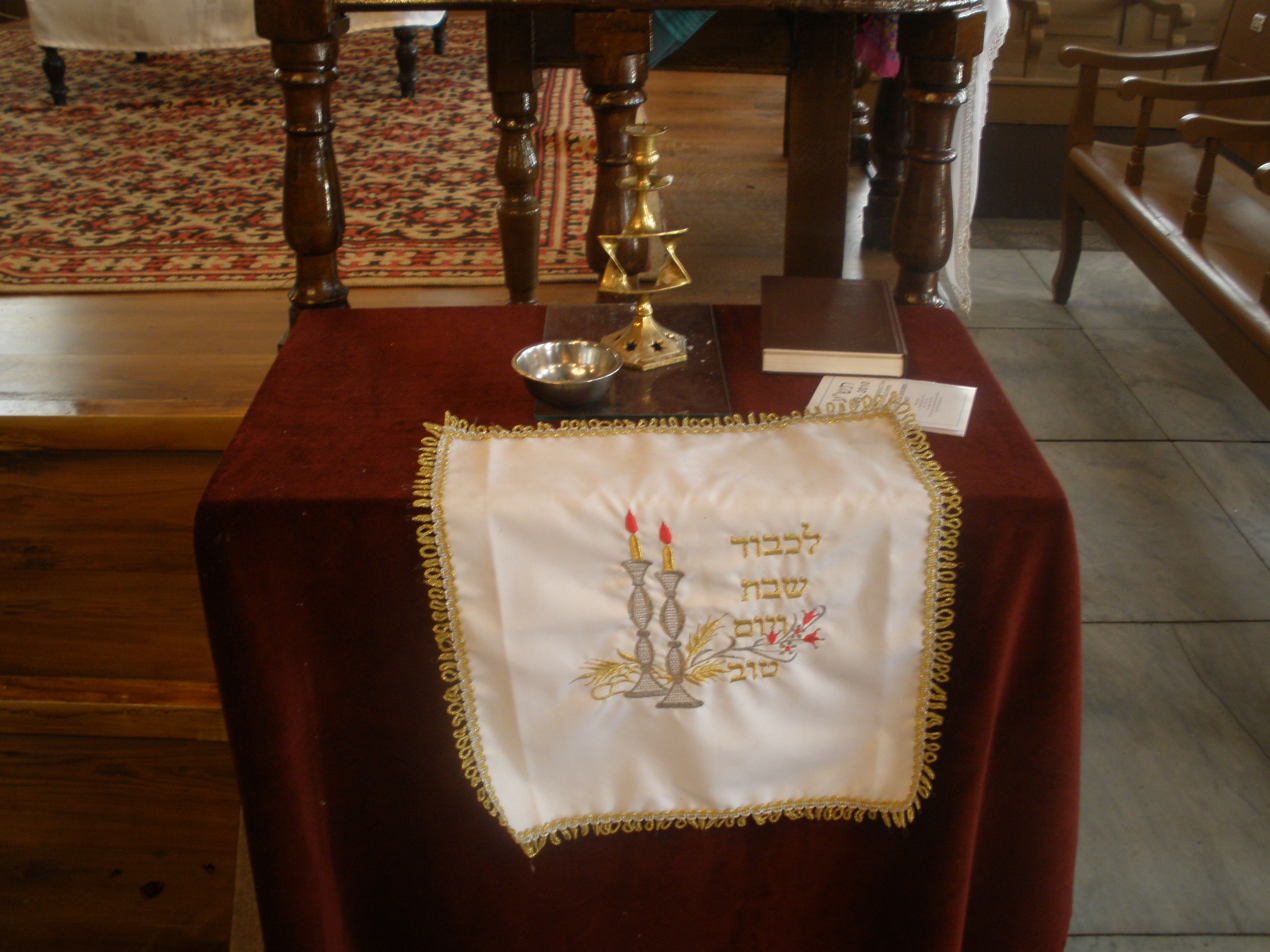

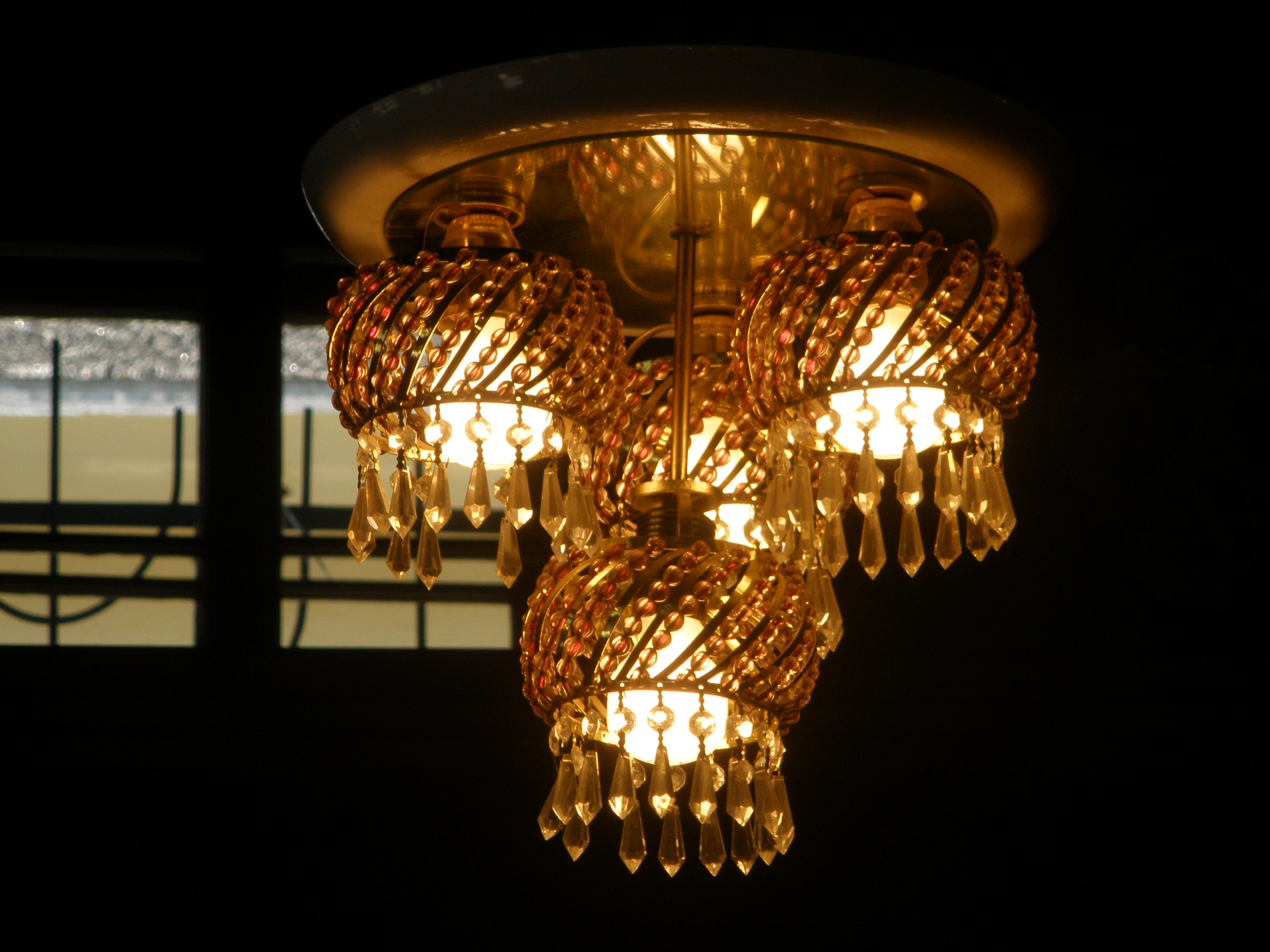

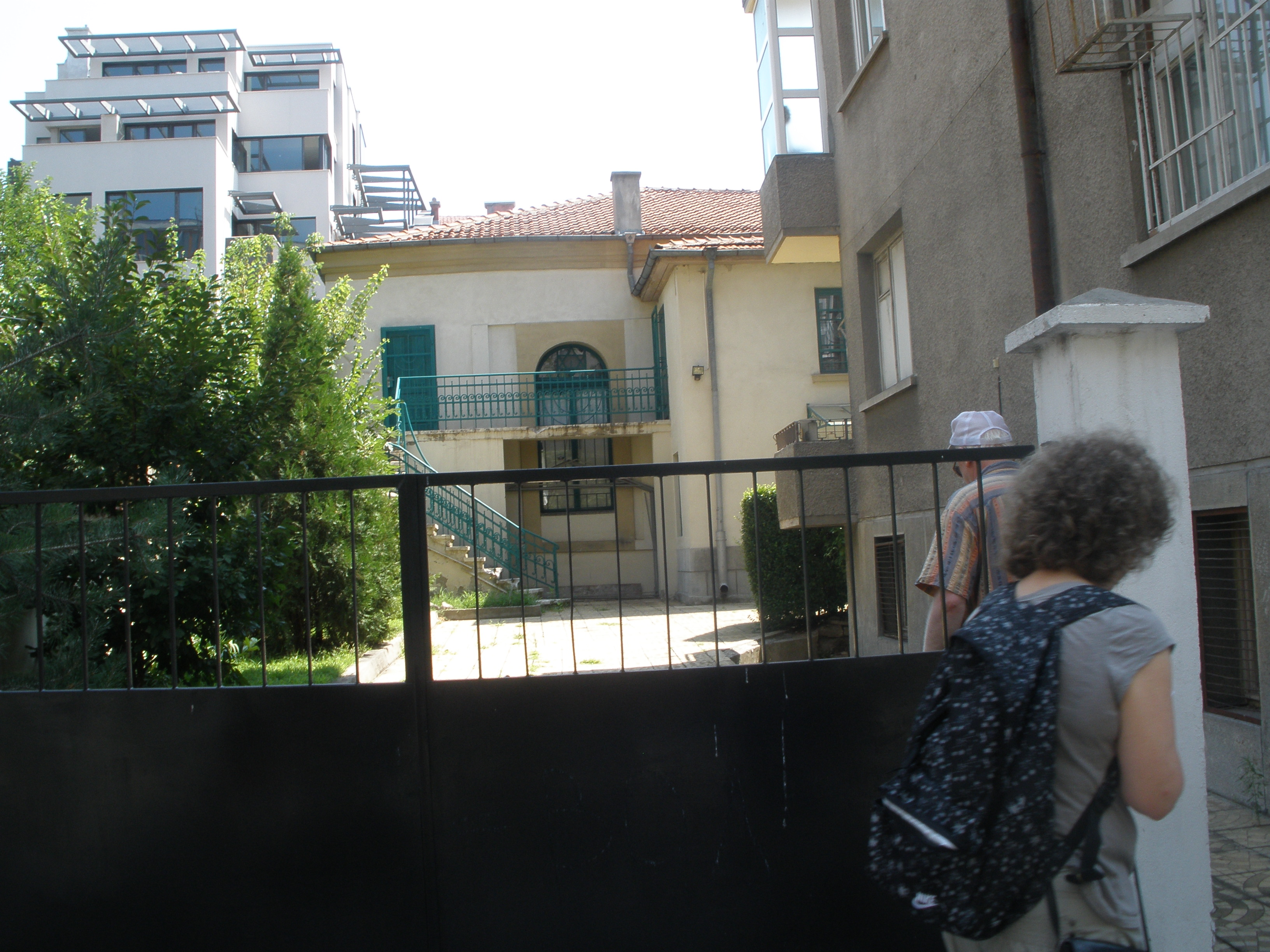

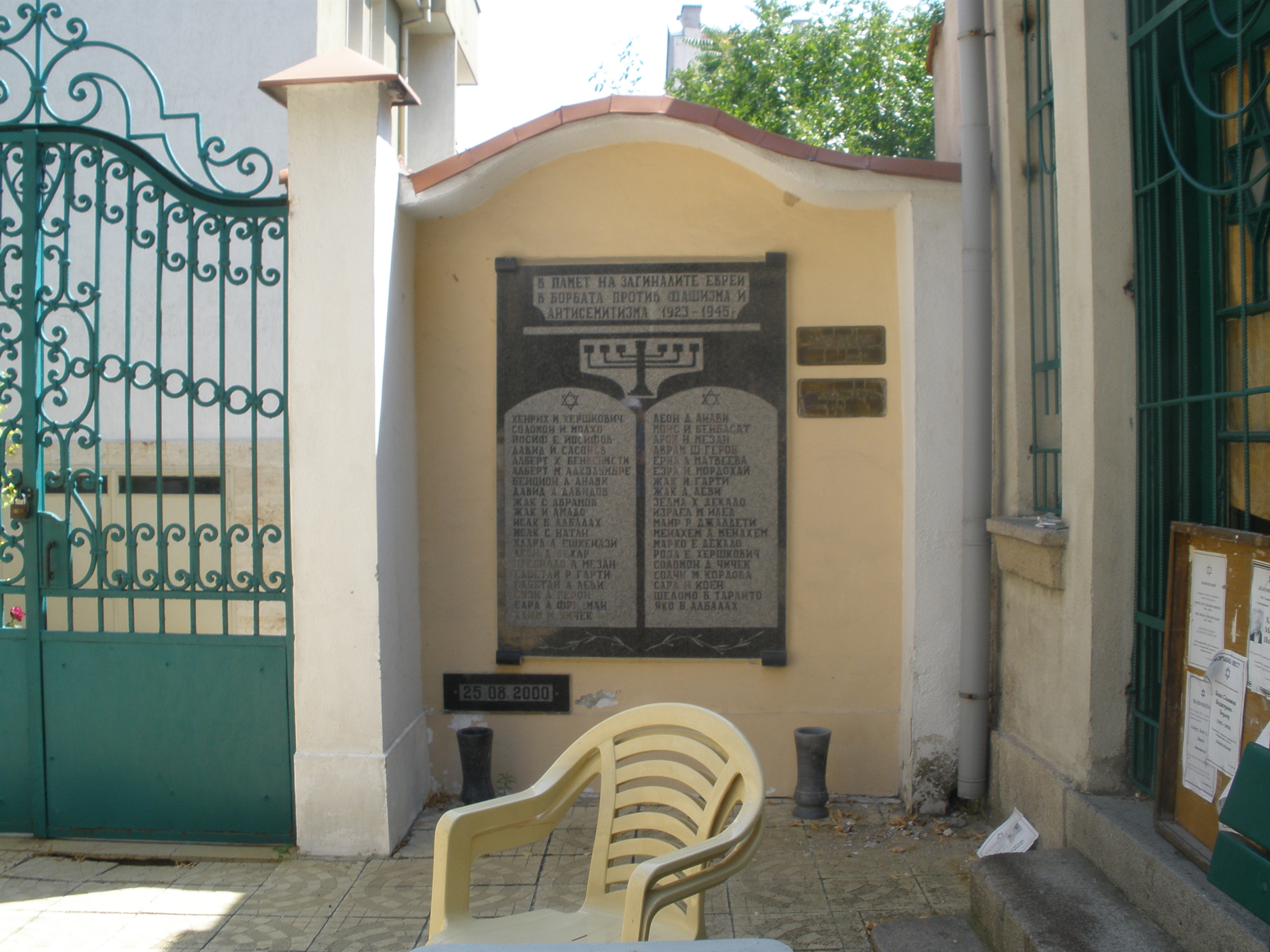

=== 2026 antisemitic vandalism ===
In January 2026, unidentified individuals sprayed swastikas and antisemitic graffiti on the gate of the synagogue, prompting a police investigation and condemnation from local Jewish leaders. According to reports, the graffiti included Nazi symbols and slurs, and authorities were notified soon after the vandalism was discovered following Shabbat services. Community representatives, including Rabbi Mendy Mendelson, described the act as an attempt to intimidate Jewish life in the city but stated that Jewish worship and community activities would continue. The incident drew broader attention from antisemitism monitoring organisations, which noted that defacing a synagogue with hate symbols reflects wider concerns about antisemitic rhetoric translating into physical acts against Jewish institutions in Europe.

== See also ==
- History of the Jews in Bulgaria
- List of synagogues in Bulgaria
