= Pazardzhik Synagogue =

Pazardzhik's historic Great and Small Synagogues

- Pazardzhik Great Synagogue: Bulgarian: Пазарджишка синагога Hebrew: בית הכנסת קהל גדול בפאזארג'יק; Pazardzhik Small Synagogue: Bulgarian: Пазарджишка малка синагога Hebrew: בית הכנסת קהל קטן בפאזארג'יק
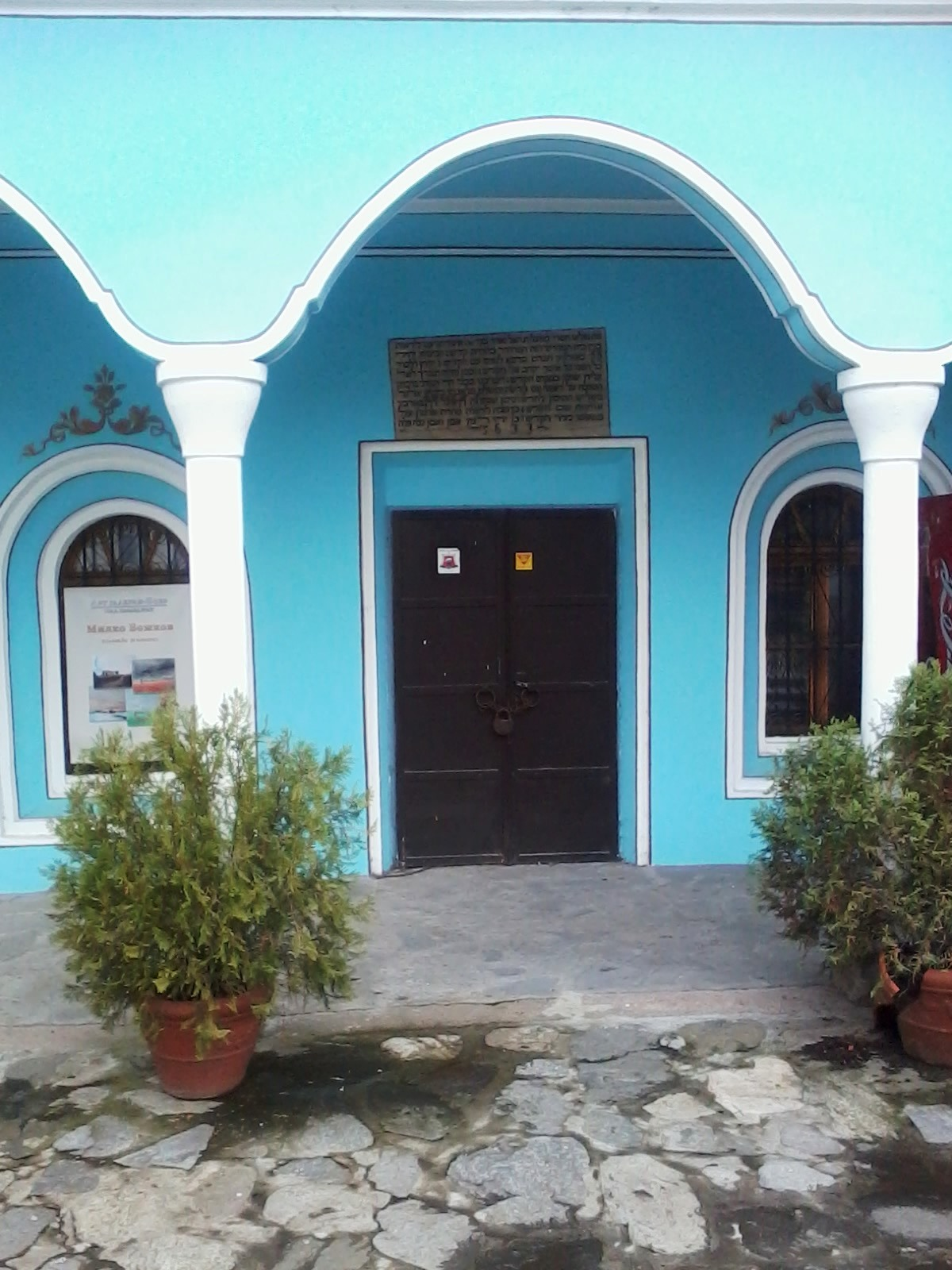
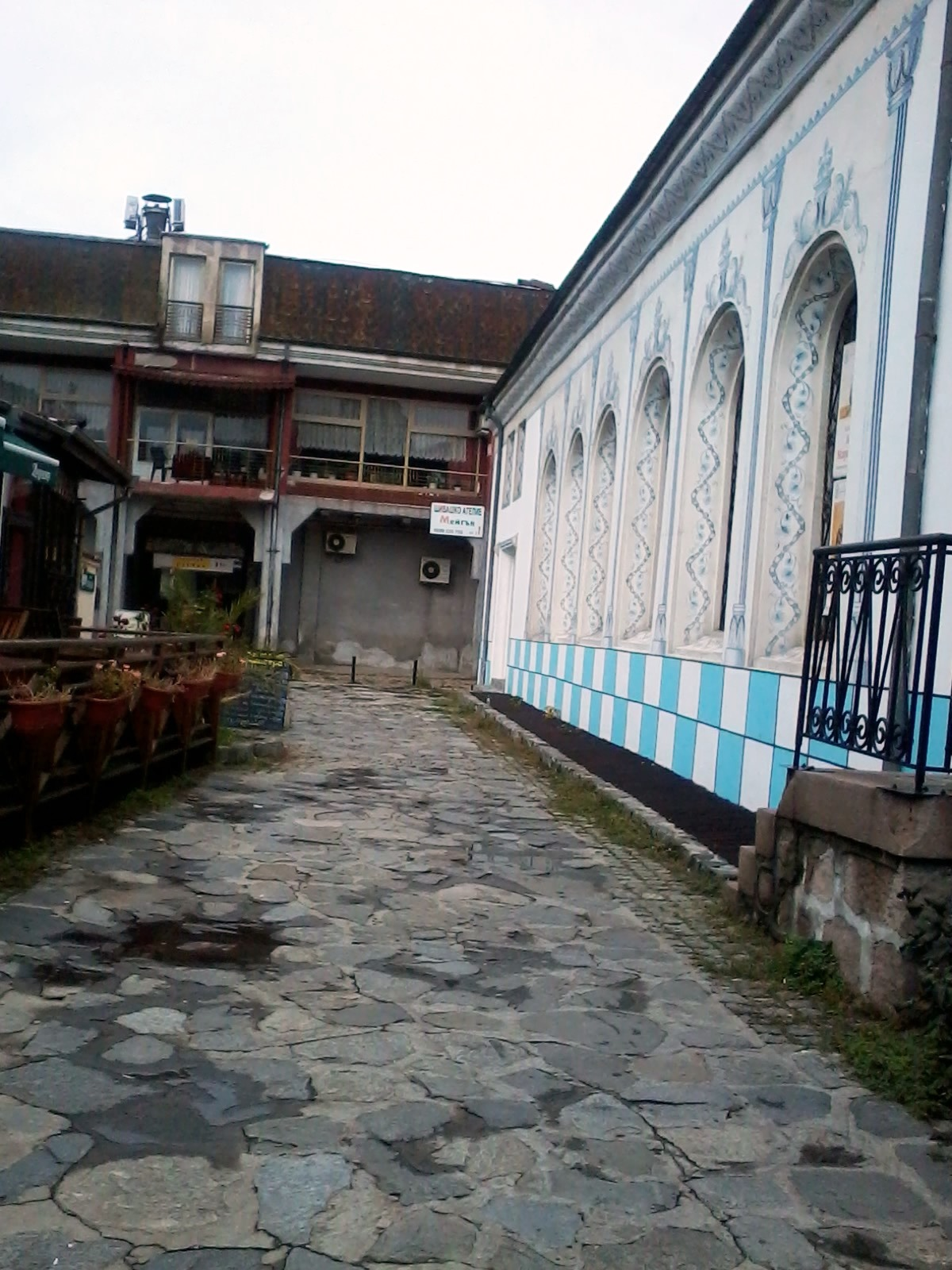
- Small (left) and Great (right) former synagogues

- Location of the former synagogues in Bulgaria

Religion
- Affiliation: Orthodox Judaism (former)
- Rite: Nusach Sefard
- Ecclesiastical or organizational status: Synagogues (1850–c. 1940s)
- Status: Closed (as synagogues); Repurposed

Location
- Location: Asen Zlatarov Street, Pazardzhik, Pazardzhik Municipality, Pazardzhik Province
- Country: Bulgaria
- Interactive map of Pazardzhik Synagogue
- Coordinates: 42°11′31″N 24°20′2″E

Architecture
- Architect: Stavri Temelkov (Great)
- Type: Synagogue architecture
- Style: Great: Bulgarian National Revival; Baroque Revival; Small: Ottoman Art Nouveau
- Established: c. 1825
- Completed: 1850 (Great); 1872 (Small)

Specifications
- Direction of façade: North-east (Great)
- Materials: Stone (both synagogues)

Pazardzhik Synagogue refers to two former Orthodox Jewish synagogues, located in Pazardzhik, Bulgaria. The Pazardzhik Great Synagogue (Bulgarian: Пазарджишка голяма синагога, Hebrew: בית הכנסת קהל גדול בפאזארג'יק), and the Pazardzhik Small Synagogue (Bulgarian: Пазарджишка малка синагога, Hebrew: בית הכנסת קהל קטן בפאזארג'יק) served as synagogues from 1850 until the c. 1940s; and subsequently as museums and for use by the Jewish community.

== History of the Jews in Pazardzhik ==
The earliest record of Judaism in Pazardzhik was in 1580 mentioned in an Ottoman register. In 1614, there were seven households. That number grew to ten between 1635 and to 41 between 1696-1697. Around 1888, the Jews were 1,277, the highest number in the history of Jews in the city. In 1945, the Jews were up to 826 (303 males, 322 females, 201 children). Their main occupations were trading and carpentry. There were 121 traders, 36 craftsmen and 35 clerks.

There were many Zionist political organizations established in the autumn of 1944, such as ''Dr. M. Nahamzon'' and ''WIZO''. The biggest one was Nahamzon, which united other Zionist organizations.

== Synagogue buildings ==
=== Great Synagogue ===
Sometimes called the Grand Synagogue or Big Synagogue, located on Asen Zlatarov Street, the larger and older synagogue was built in 1850. Designed by Stavri Temelkov, associated with the Bratsigovo architect school, the 5-metre-high (16 ft) stone synagogue was completed in the Bulgarian National Revival and Baroque Revival styles. It is believed that there was a previous synagogue in the same location constructed in the 17th century and burnt in the first half of the 19th century. Due to the mass emigration of Jews in Bulgaria, the synagogue is left to be not used for their intended purpose. The synagogue was believed to be used up until the c. 1940s.

In 1972, the synagogue was formally closed and used as a regional museum. In 1979, it was completely renovated, declared a Bulgarian architectural monument of culture, and then given back to the Jewish community in Pazardzhik.

=== Small Synagogue ===
The smaller synagogue, also located on Asen Zlatarov Street, was completed in 1872 in the Ottoman Art Nouveau style. From 1954 to 1979, the synagogue was used as a library for the local historical museum; and as a restaurant.

== See also ==
- History of the Jews in Bulgaria
- List of synagogues in Bulgaria
