= List of synagogues in Bulgaria =

This is a list of synagogues, Jewish houses of prayer, in Bulgaria.

Name	Location	Built	Architectural style	Status	Image	Reference
Sofia Synagogue	Sofia	1909	Moorish Revival	functioning		
Plovdiv Synagogue (Zion)	Plovdiv	1887		functioning		
Synagogue of Philippopolis	Plovdiv	3rd – 4th century		in ruins		
Vidin Synagogue	Vidin	1894		in ruins, building being reconstructed		
Varna Sephardic Synagogue	Varna	1890	Moorish Revival, Gothic Revival	in ruins		
Varna Ashkenazi Synagogue	Varna	1910		Reconstructed in 2007, functioning		
Burgas Synagogue	Burgas	1909	Moorish Revival, Neo-Byzantine, Neoclassical	now used as Petko Zadgorski Burgas Art Gallery, building being reconstructed		
Samokov Synagogue	Samokov	1860		in ruins		
Pazardzhik Great Synagogue	Pazardzhik	1850	Bulgarian National Revival Neo-Baroque	not functioning		
Pazardzhik Small Synagogue	Pazardzhik	1872	Bulgarian National Revival	not functioning		
Shumen Synagogue	Shumen	mid-19th century		Demolished	, בית_הכנסת_בשומן	
Dobrich Synagogue	Dobrich	1887				
Gotse Delchev Synagogue	Gotse Delchev (town)	early 20th century				
Silistra Synagogue	Silistra			preserved		
Yambol Synagogue (Bulgaria)	Yambol	1896		now used as George Papazov Art Gallery		בית_הכנסת_בימבול
