= Synagogue of Philippopolis =

Former synagogue in Plovdiv, Bulgaria

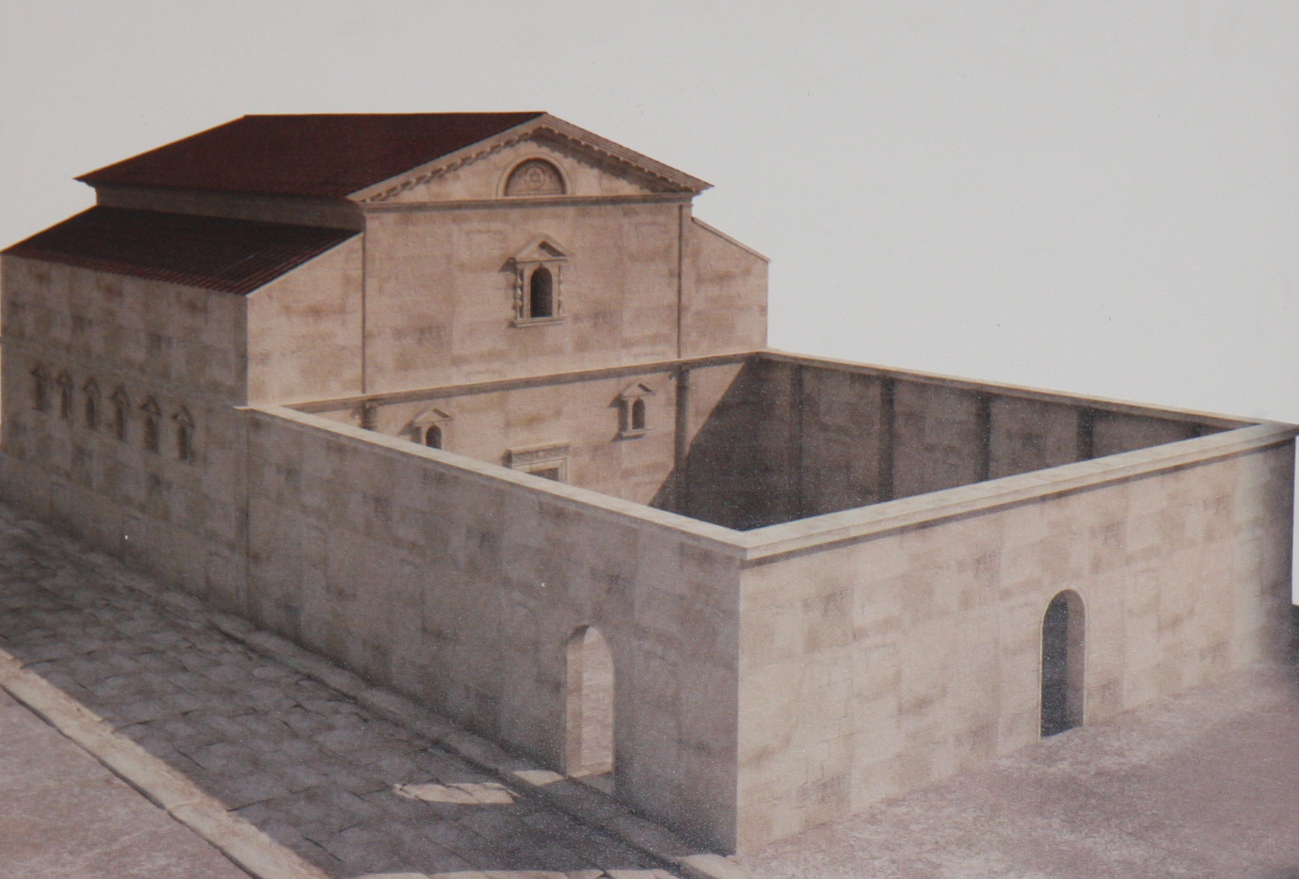
- A model of the former ancient synagogue

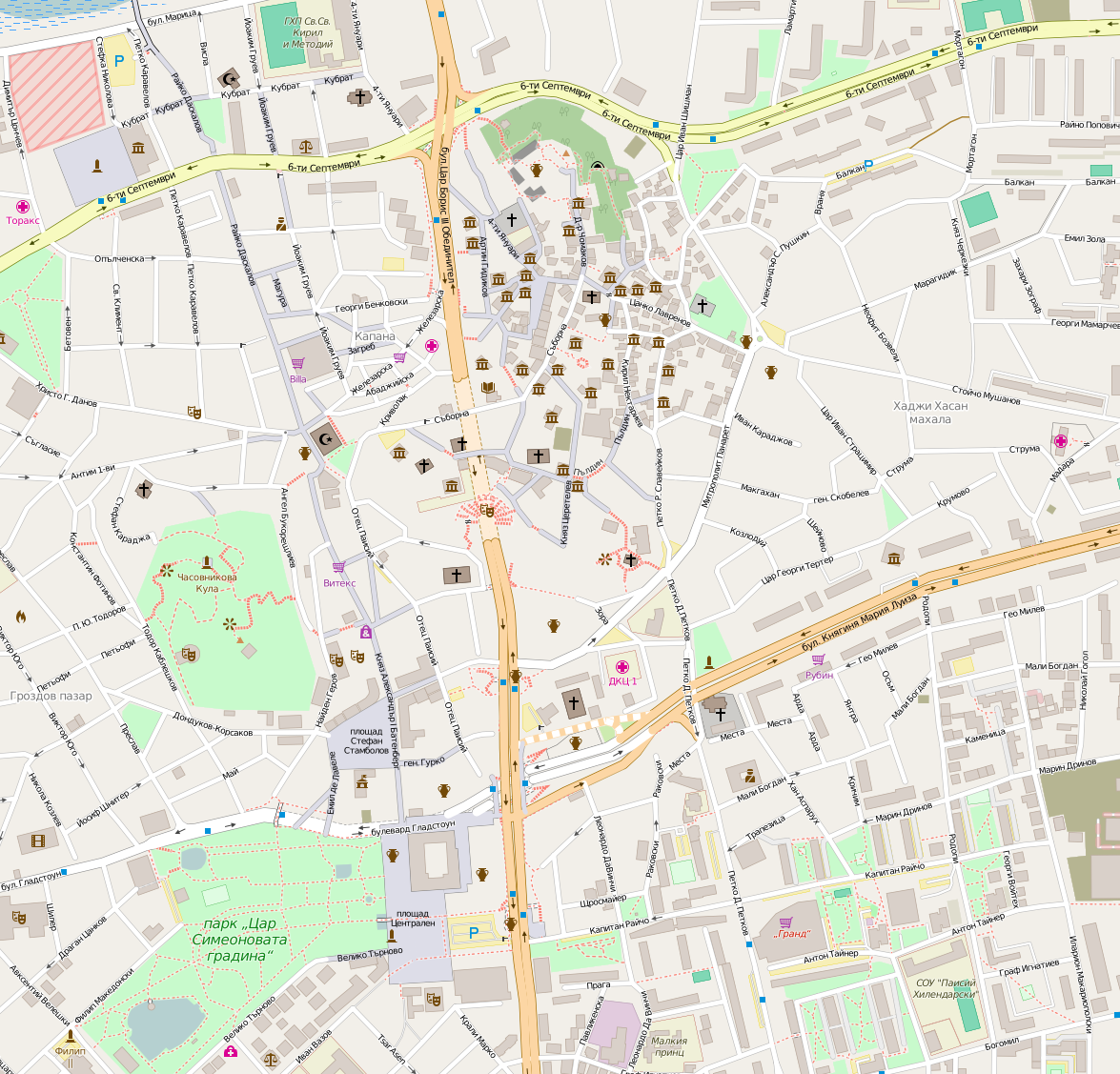
- Location of the ancient synagogue in modern-day Plovdiv, Bulgaria

Religion
- Affiliation: Judaism (former)
- Ecclesiastical or organizational status: Synagogue (3rd–6th century AD)
- Status: Abandoned; destroyed

Location
- Location: Philippopolis; now Maria Luiza Blvd, Plovdiv
- Country: Bulgaria
- Interactive map of Synagogue of Philippopolis
- Coordinates: 42°08′43″N 24°45′19″E

Architecture
- Completed: 3rd century AD
- Destroyed: 6th century AD (abandoned)

Specifications
- Direction of façade: South
- Length: 13.5 metres (44 ft)
- Width (nave): 14.2 metres (47 ft)

The Synagogue of Philippopolis is a former Jewish synagogue, built in ancient Philippopolis. The synagogue ruins are located on Maria Luiza Blvd, in the city of Plovdiv, in modern-day Bulgaria. Built in the 3rd century AD, the synagogue is the only ancient Jewish temple found in Bulgaria. The foundation of the temple, on part of the mosaic floor, is preserved.

== The former synagogue building ==
The synagogue was built in the beginning of the 3rd century AD during the reign of the Severan dynasty as a basilica-like building with three naves (a central one and two aisles). The building faced south to Jerusalem. The central nave was 9 metres (30 ft) wide and the two aisles were each 2.6 metres (8 ft 6 in) wide. The building was approximately 13.5 metres (44 ft) long. The ruins of the former synagogue were discovered in 1981 during an archaeological excavation of an adjacent site.

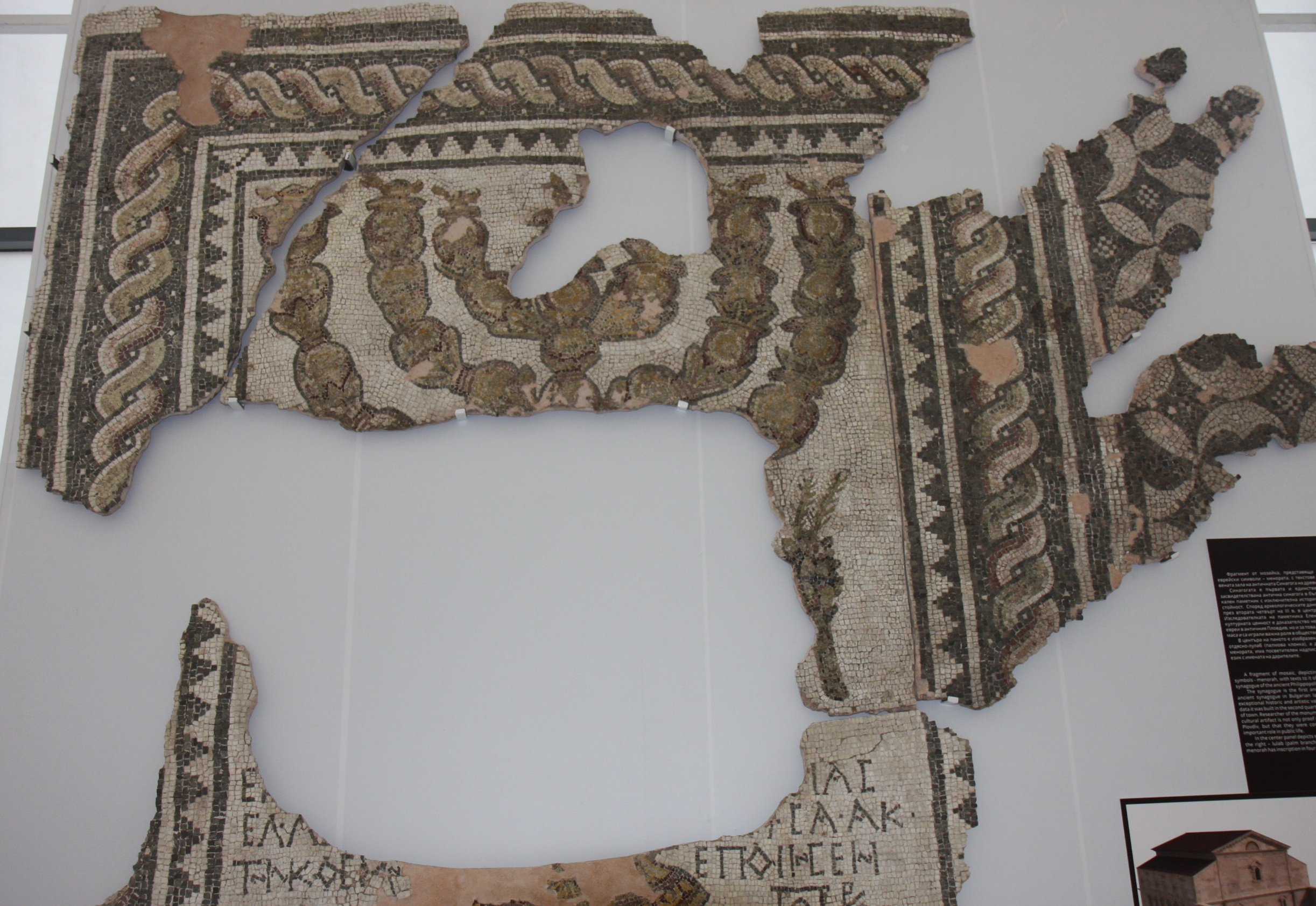
Mosaic fragment from the ancient synagogue of Philippopolis in the Regional Archeological Museum of Plovdiv

The purpose of the building was determined when two mosaic floors were found during archeological researches. They were built one over another with great craftsmanship and extremely rich colors. The floor mosaics depicted images of Menorah and palm branch which are symbolic for the Jewish community and other geometrical shapes. A four-line inscription in Greek was found as well which provide information for the names of the donors of the temple. The mosaic floor of the building was removed and restored and, since 2016, has been on permanent display at the Plovdiv Archaeological Museum.

The synagogue was almost destroyed during the invasion of the Goths in 250 AD but later it was rebuilt in its original design. The building was destroyed again in the beginning of the 5th century during the persecution of Jews in the Roman Empire. Then, the building was restored and expanded. The second layer of floor mosaics which excluded Jewish symbols is evidence of that period. The synagogue was completely abandoned and destroyed in the end of the 6th century AD.

== See also ==
- History of the Jews in Bulgaria
- List of synagogues in Bulgaria
