= Sofia Synagogue =

Synagogue in Sofia, Bulgaria

- Bulgarian: Софийска синагога
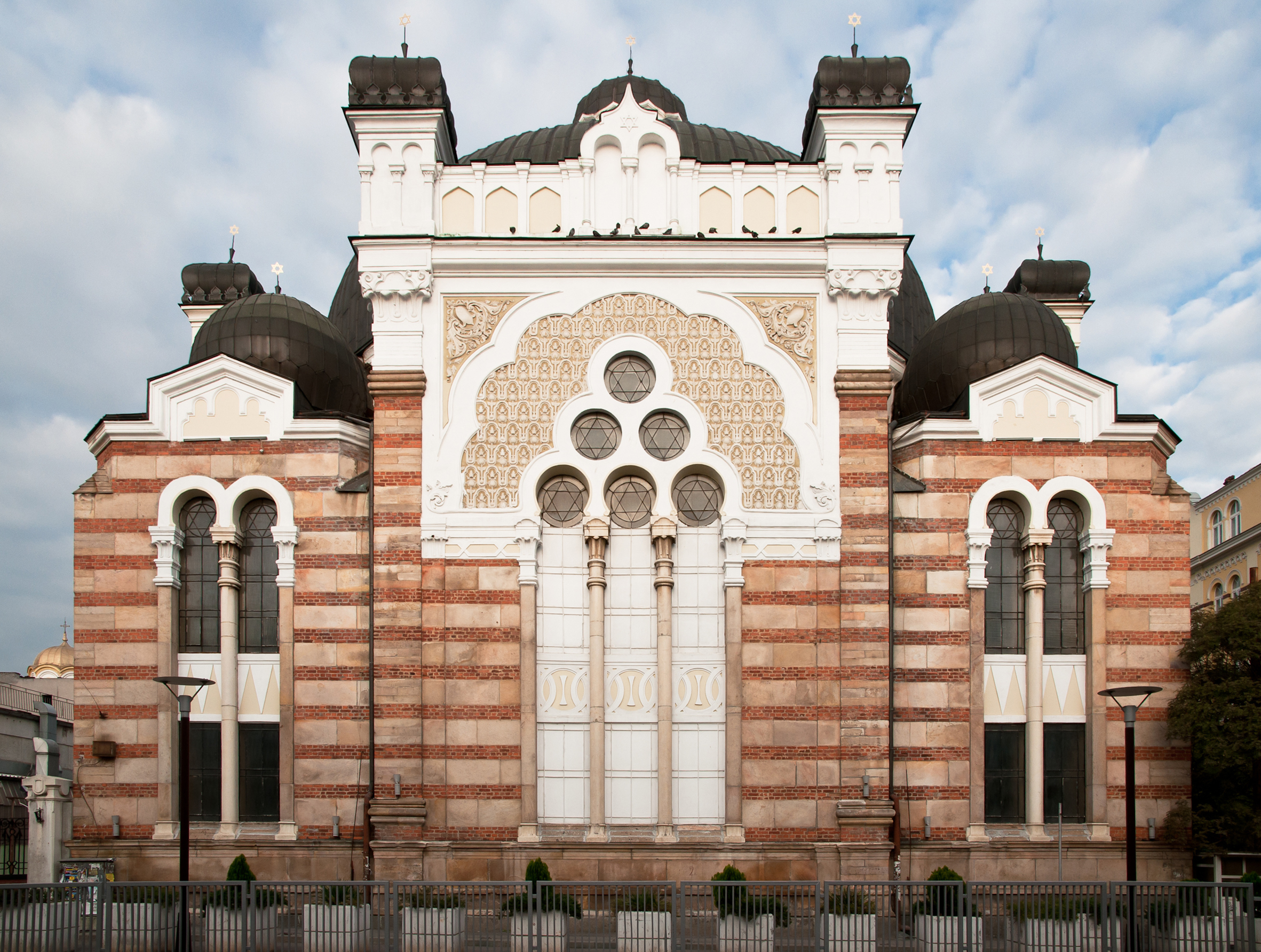
- The synagogue in 2010

- Location of the synagogue in Bulgaria

Religion
- Affiliation: Orthodox Judaism
- Rite: Romaniote; Nusach Sefard
- Ecclesiastical or organizational status: Synagogue; Jewish museum (since 1992)
- Leadership: Rabbi Bechor Kachlon
- Status: Active

Location
- Location: Sofia
- Country: Bulgaria
- Interactive map of Sofia Synagogue
- Coordinates: 42°42′0″N 23°19′16″E

Architecture
- Architect: Friedrich Grünanger
- Type: Synagogue architecture
- Style: Moorish Revival; Byzantine Revival; Vienna Secession; Venetian
- Completed: 1909

Specifications
- Direction of façade: East
- Capacity: 1,170 worshippers
- Interior area: 659 square metres (7,090 sq ft)
- Height (max): 31 metres (102 ft)
- Dome: Three (maybe more)
- Dome height (inner): 23 metres (75 ft)
- Dome dia. (inner): 19 metres (62 ft)
- Site area: 1,000 square metres (11,000 sq ft)
- Materials: Carrara marble

Website
- sofiasynagogue.com

The Sofia Synagogue (Bulgarian: Софийска синагога, Sofiyska sinagoga) is a Romaniote Orthodox Jewish congregation and synagogue, located in Sofia, Bulgaria. Completed in 1909, the synagogue is the largest synagogue in Southeastern Europe, the third-largest in Europe, and one of two active synagogues remaining in Bulgaria.

Despite the building's size, the services are normally only attended by some 50 to 60 worshippers due to the aliyah of most of Bulgaria's Jews to Israel and the secularity of the local Jewish population.

== History ==
Constructed for the needs of Sofia's mainly Sephardic Jewish community after a project by the Austrian architect Friedrich Grünanger, the synagogue building resembles the old Moorish Leopoldstädter Tempel in Vienna. The synagogue was officially opened on 9 September 1909 in the presence of King Ferdinand I of Bulgaria. The first preparations for the synagogue's construction date from 1903, while the construction began on 13 November 1905. The construction of a grand new synagogue was part of the reorganization efforts of the Bulgarian Jewish community under Lemberg-born Chief Rabbi Marcus Ehrenpreis and local leaders Ezra Tadjer and Avram Davidjon Levy. Prior to the construction of the new synagogue, the lot in central Sofia had been occupied by an older synagogue.

One of the architectural monuments of Sofia, the synagogue, located in the very centre of the city near the Central Market Hall, can accommodate approximately 1,300 worshippers. The Sofia Synagogue's main chandelier weighs 1.7 tonnes (1.9 short tons) and is the largest in the country.

The synagogue's architecture is predominately Moorish Revival and Byzantine Revival in style, with elements of the Vienna Secession and, in the façade, Venetian architecture. The main premises has a diameter of 20 metres (66 ft) and is 31 metres (102 ft) high. It is topped by an octagonal dome. The interior is richly decorated, featuring columns of Carrara marble and multicoloured Venetian mosaics, as well as decorative woodcarving. The entire building takes up 659 square metres (7,090 sq ft). The biggest chandelier in the Balkans is there and the rumor said it is made from gold from Ancient Palestine.

Since 8 May 1992 the Sofia Synagogue also houses the Jewish Museum of History, which includes the Jewish Communities in Bulgaria, the Holocaust and the Rescue of the Jews in Bulgaria expositions. A souvenir shop is also in operation.

== Gallery ==
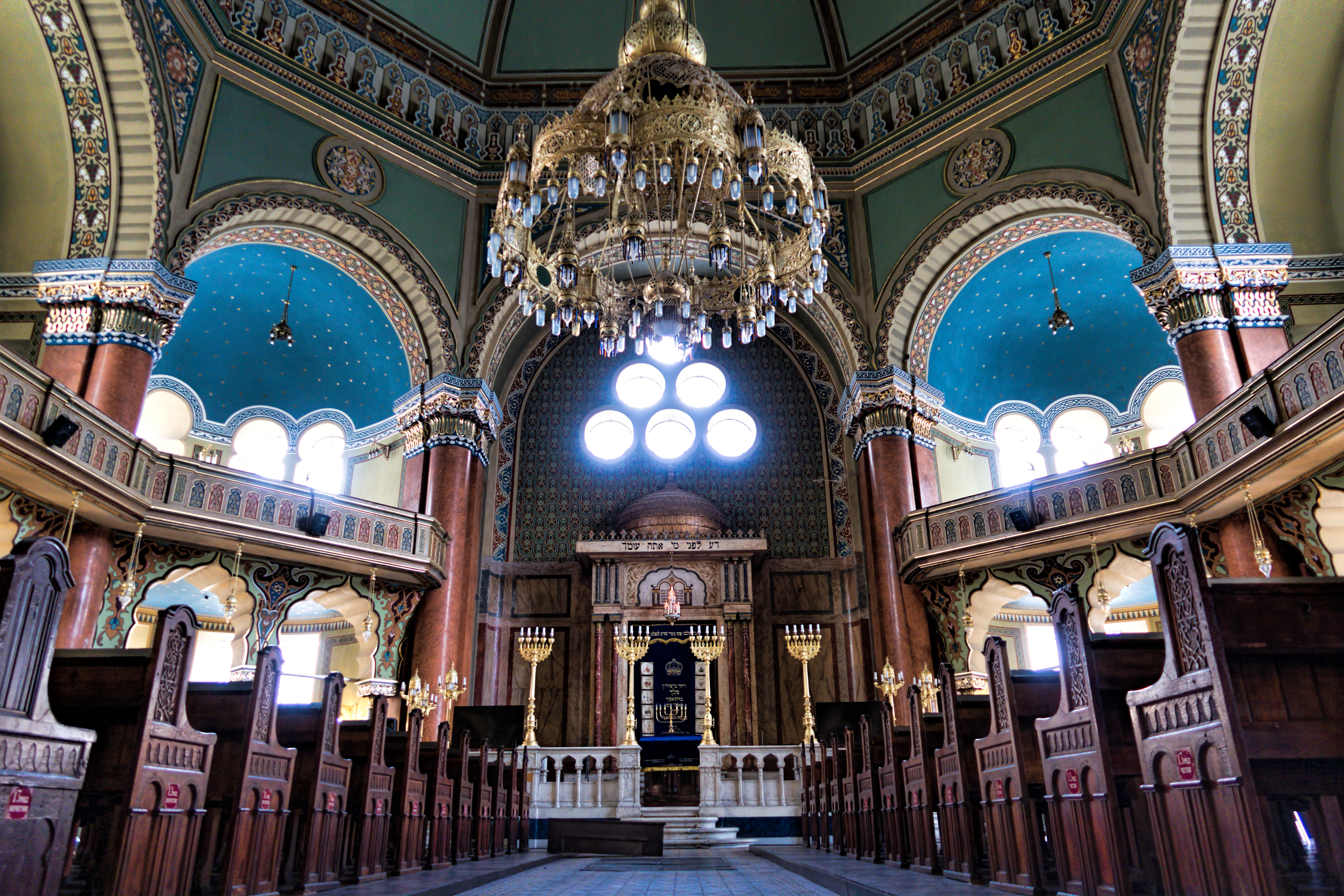

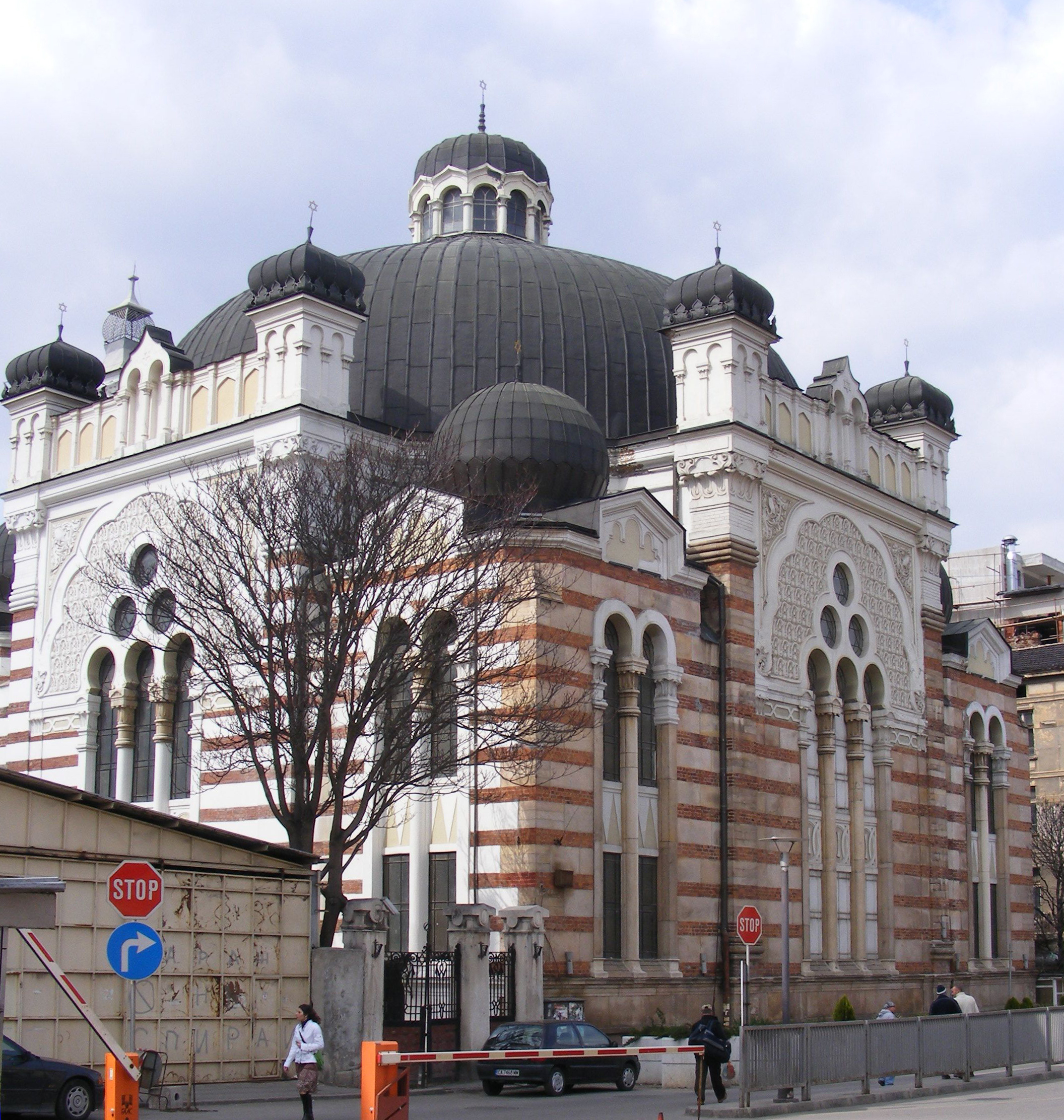

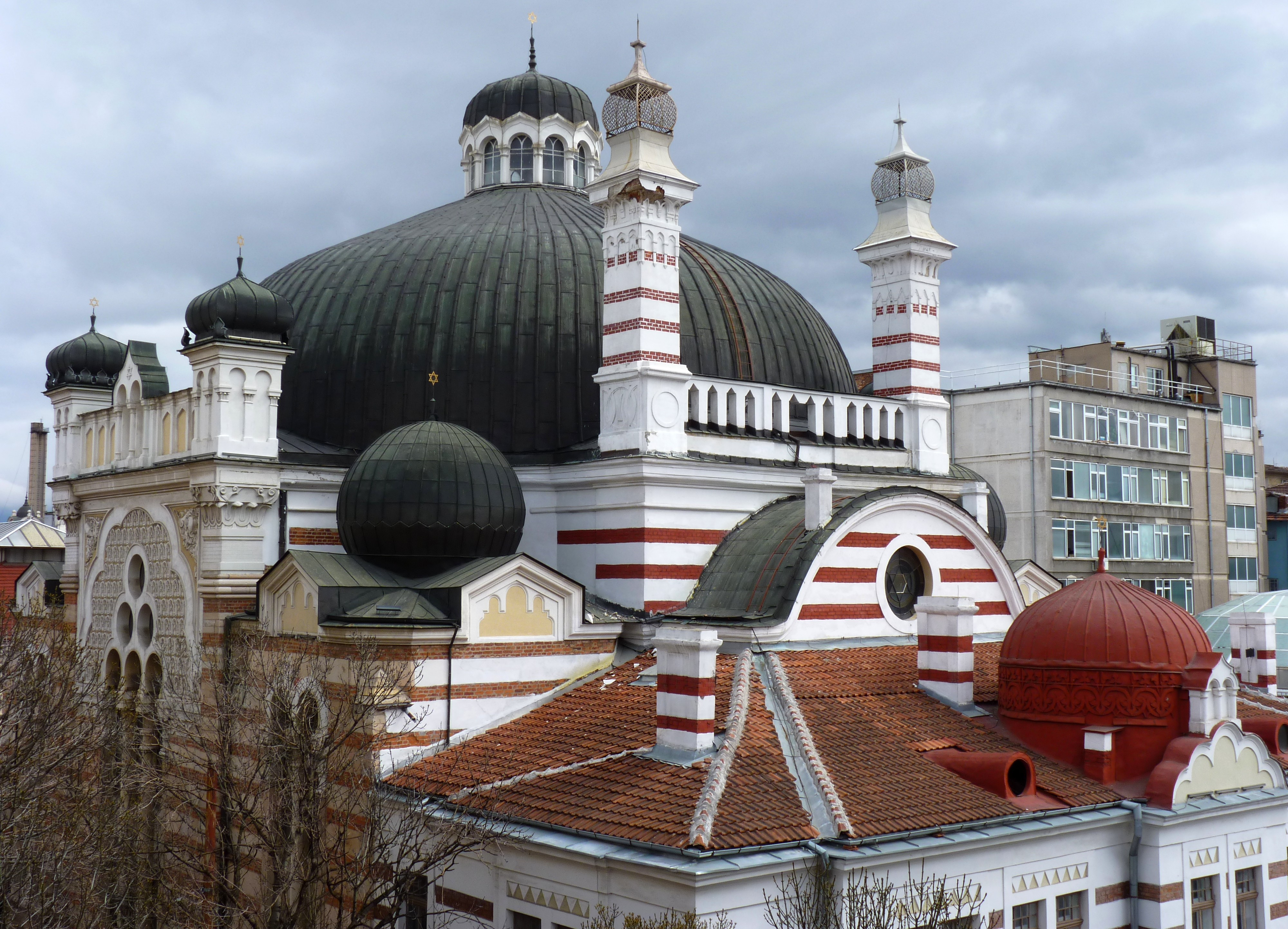

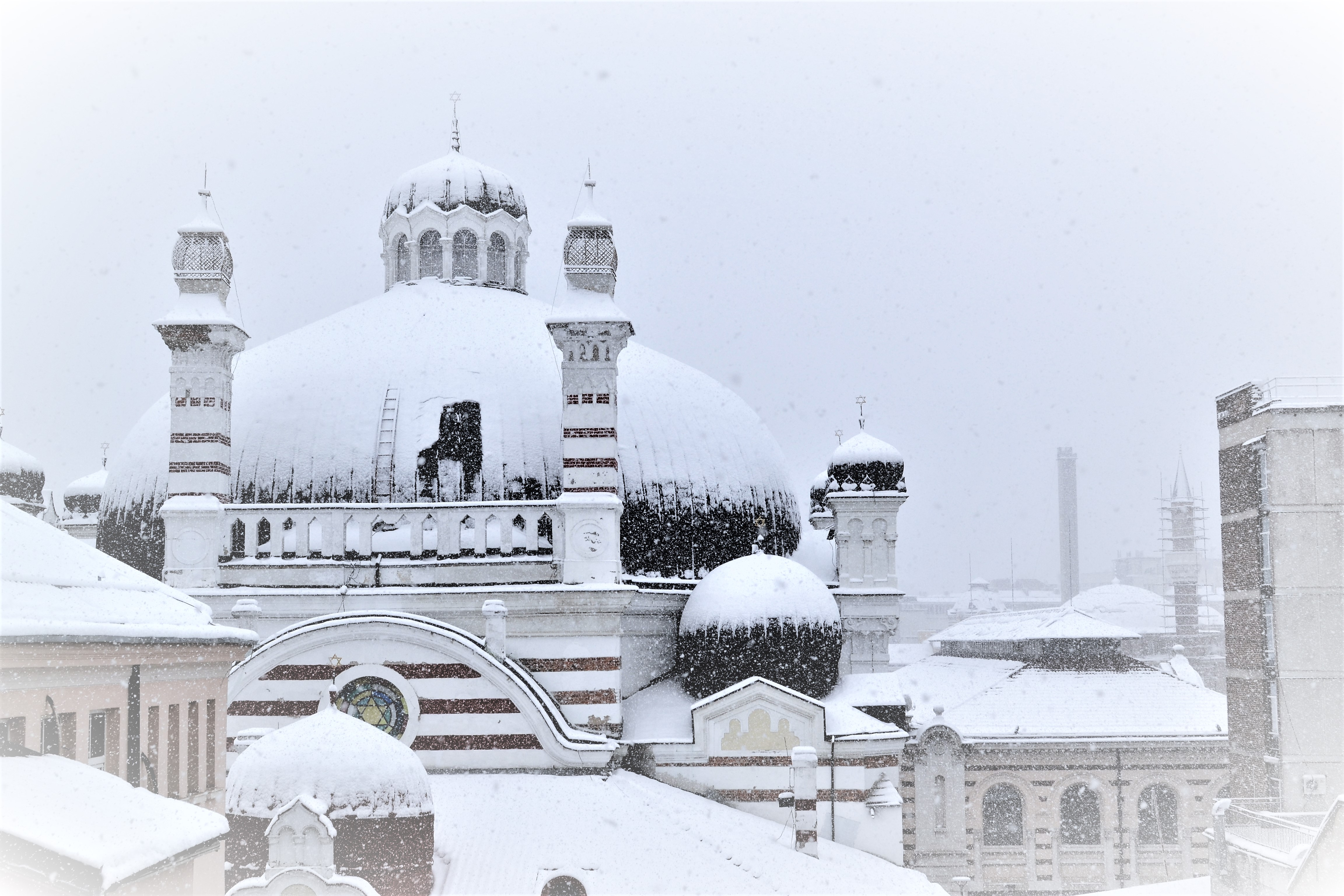

== See also ==
- History of the Jews in Bulgaria
- List of synagogues in Bulgaria
