= Karakachanov =

Karakachanov (Bulgarian: Каракачанов) is a Bulgarian family name related to the Sarakatsani. It may refer to:

- Aleksandar Karakachanov, Green Party of Bulgaria leader, former mayor of Sofia
- Krasimir Karakachanov, Bulgarian politician, leader of the VMRO-BND party, Minister of Defense and Deputy prime minister
