= Vidim =

Vidim may refer to:

- Vidim (Mělník District), a municipality and village in the Czech Republic
- Vidim, Russia, an urban-type settlement in Irkutsk Oblast, Russia
