= Petr Alabin =

Russian noble (1824–1896)

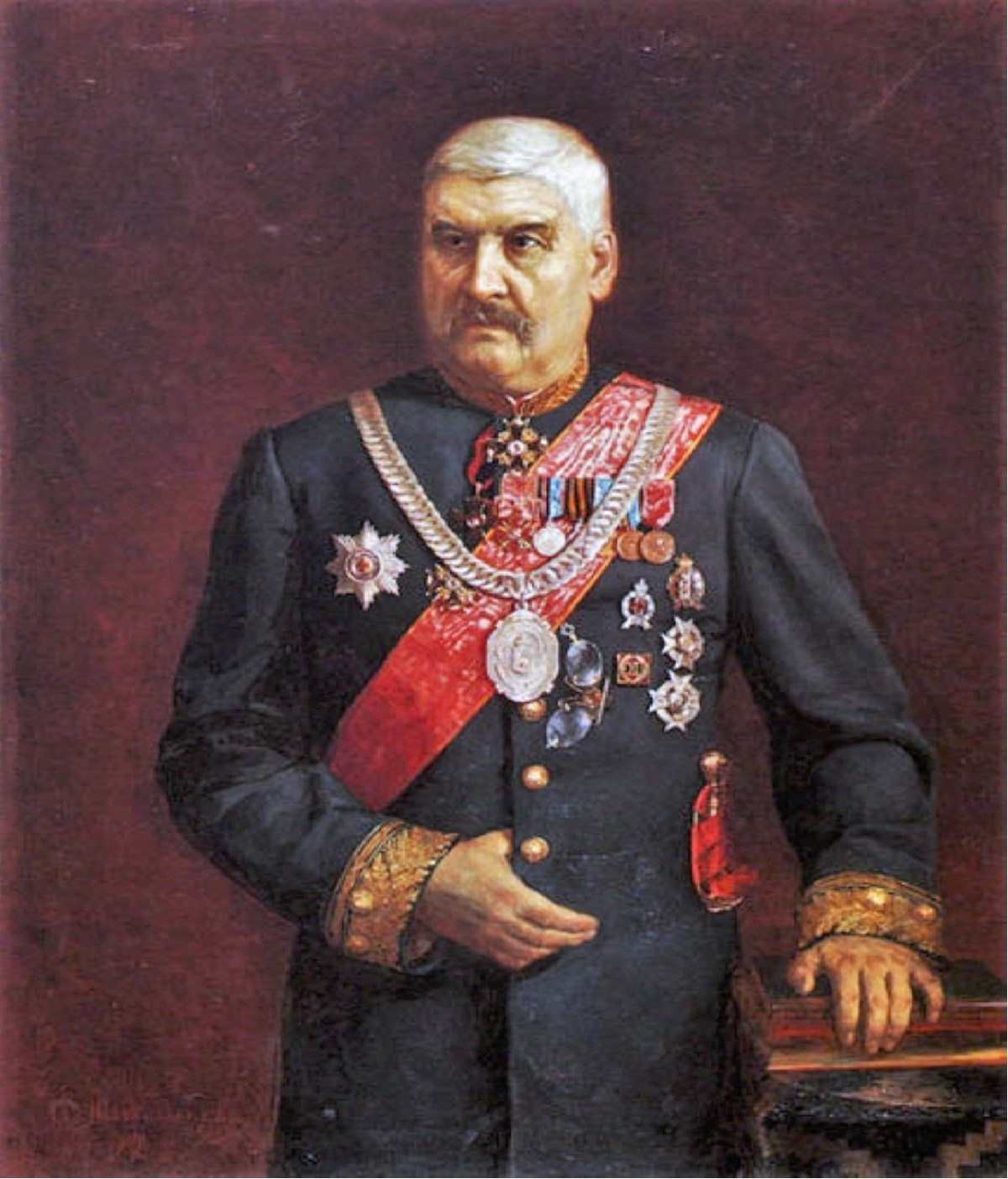
- portrait by Alexander Novoskoltsev
- Born: 29 August 1824; Podolsk
- Died: 10 May 1896 (aged 71); Samara
- Occupations: Historian and public figure
- Known for: Governor of Sofia 1878-1879

Petr Alabin, (Bulgarian: Пьотр Алабин) (1824–1896) was a Russian count, civil servant, public figure and journalist. He began the production of the Samara flag for the Bulgarian Volunteer Corps. During the Provisional Russian Administration in Bulgaria (1878-1879), he was governor of Sofia.

== Early life ==
Alabin came from a noble family. His father married a Frenchwoman. He graduated from the St. Petersburg Trade School. He enlisted in the Russian Imperial Army as an officer and participated in the suppression of the Hungarian Revolution. He took part in the Crimean War and the defense of Sevastopol.

Alabin was a prominent figure in the Slavic Charity Organization. He was the first chairman of the Samara National Audit Office, serving for 10 years, after which he became governor of Samara.

After his return from free Bulgaria, he was mayor of Samara and an MP in the Duma.

== See also ==
- Petr Alabin in Russian
- Alexander Nevsky Cathedral, Sofia

Preceded by	Mayor of Sofia; 1878-1879	Succeeded by Manolaki Tashev
