= Georgi Stoilov =

Bulgarian architect and politician (1929–2022)

- Stoilov in 2012

Minister of Architecture and Public Works
- In office 9 July 1971 – 24 July 1973
- Preceded by: Georgi Belichki (as Minister of Construction and Building Materials)
- Succeeded by: Grigor Stoichkov (as Minister of Construction and Architecture)

Mayor of Sofia
- In office 20 September 1967 – 11 November 1971
- Preceded by: Georgi Petkov
- Succeeded by: Ivan Panev

Member of the National Assembly of Bulgaria
- In office 11 March 1966 – 3 April 1990

Personal details
- Born: Georgi Vladimirov Stoilov; 3 April 1929 Kondofrey, Bulgaria
- Died: 14 December 2022 (aged 93) Sofia, Bulgaria
- Party: BCP (1949–1990); BSP (1990–2022)
- Education: Moscow Architectural Institute
- Occupation: Architect

Georgi Vladimirov Stoilov (Bulgarian: Георги Владимиров Стоилов; 3 April 1929 – 14 December 2022) was a Bulgarian architect and politician best known for designing the Buzludzha Monument.

== Early life ==
Stoilov was born on 3 April 1929 in the village of Kondofrey in western Bulgaria. As part of the Bulgarian resistance movement during World War II, he joined the Workers Youth League and the Radomir Partisan Detachment in 1944. Stoilov became a full member of the Bulgarian Communist Party by 1949. He graduated from the Moscow Architectural Institute in 1954 before beginning his career at the Glavproekt Institute in Sofia.

== Career ==
Stoilov served in the National Assembly of Bulgaria from 1966 to 1990, was mayor of Sofia from 1967 to 1971, and was Minister of Architecture and Public Works from 1971 to 1973.

Stoilov died in Sofia on 14 December 2022, at the age of 93.
