= Ivan Ivan =

Ivan Ivan may refer to:

- Ivan Ivan (ice hockey) (born 2002), Czech ice hockey player
- Ivan Ivan (politician) (born 1945), American politician and tribal leader
- Ivan Ivan (active 1983–84), member of the band Dominatrix

== See also ==
- Ivan Ivanov
- Ivan Ivanovich
