= List of mayors of Sofia =

Mayor of Sofia, Bulgaria
- Incumbent; Vasil Terziev since 13 November 2023
- Inaugural holder: Manolaki Tashev
- Formation: 10 February 1878

The Coat of arms of Sofia, which was restored by the city's first democratically elected mayor, Alexander Yanchulev (1991–1995).

The post of Mayor of Sofia, the capital of Bulgaria, was established after the Liberation of Bulgaria in 1878. The first governor of Sofia was Petr Alabin. Initially, the mayors of Sofia were assigned by the Provisional Russian Administration. After the newly restored Bulgarian state was already functioning on its own, in the end of 1878, mayors were chosen by the municipal council. Until 1944, the mayor (with the official title of "Chairman of the City Administrative Council") was appointed through a Tsar's decree after a candidate was suggested by the Minister of Internal Affairs. After that date, the mayor (officially "Chairman of the Executive Committee of the Sofia City (later Capital) People's Council") was formally chosen by the municipal councilors, albeit after being specified by the Bulgarian Communist Party management.

Since the democratic changes and the 7th Grand National Assembly in 1990 that led to the appointment of an interim mayor (Green Party of Bulgaria leader Aleksandar Karakachanov), the residents of Sofia received the right to choose their mayor, the first democratically elected one being Alexander Yanchulev on 13 October 1991.

== List ==
No.	from	until	mayor (кмет, kmet)	notes
1	10 February 1878	8 June 1878	Manolaki Tashev	first mayor; assigned by the Provisional Russian Administration; died from cancer
2	9 June 1878	1 August 1878	Dimitar Hadzhikotsev	
3	2 August 1878	29 December 1878	Dimitar Dimov	
4	30 December 1878	13 September 1879	Todoraki Peshov	
5	14 September 1879	30 June 1890	Dimitar Traykovich	
6	1 July 1880	30 December 1880	Todor Ikonomov	
7	15 February 1881	30 September 1881	Nikola Daskalov	
8	1 October 1881	29 April 1883	Ivan Hadzhienov	
9	30 April 1883	27 December 1883	Nikola Suknarov	
10	28 December 1883	9 May 1884	Dimitar Hadzhikotsev	
11	10 May 1884	24 August 1885	Todoraki Peshov	2nd inconsecutive term
12	25 August 1885	19 October 1886	Ivan Slaveykov	
13	20 October 1886	1 November 1887	Yosif Kovachev	
14	21 November 1887	31 August 1888	Nikola Daskalov	2nd nonconsecutive term
15	1 September 1888	7 October 1893	Dimitar Petkov	
16	18 October 1893	31 May 1894	Hristo Blagoev	
17	16 July 1894	15 July 1895	Ivan Grozev	
18	16 July 1895	30 September 1896	Dr. Dimitar Mollov	
19	1 October 1896	7 April 1897	Grigor Nachovich	
20	8 April 1897	11 April 1899	Dimitar Yablanski	
21	12 April 1899	4 January 1901	Hristo Popov	
22	4 April 1901	23 September 1903	Petar Chernev	
23	2 March 1904	7 July 1905	Petko Nikolov	
24	8 July 1905	21 March 1908	Martin Todorov	
25	22 March 1908	31 March 1908	Dr. Georgi Sarafov	shortest term, 9 days
26	1 April 1908	31 July 1908	Atanas Hranov (mayor)	
27	1 August 1908	18 October 1910	Evstati Kirkov	
28	1 November 1910	17 August 1911	Konstantin Batolov	
29	27 September 1911	22 May 1912	Haralampi Karastoyanov	
30	23 May 1912	11 February 1914	Ivan Dimitriev Geshov	
31	12 February 1914	18 March 1915	Petko Todorov	
32	23 June 1915	11 August 1918	Radi Radev	
33	12 September 1918	5 September 1920	Dr. Georgi Kalinkov	
34	6 September 1920	8 June 1922	Konstantin Batolov	2nd nonconsecutive term
35	8 June 1922	9 June 1923	Krum Popov	shot during a coup d'état
36	10 June 1923	13 July 1924	Ivan Ploshtakov	
37	14 July 1924	16 April 1925	Paskal Paskalev	killed in the St Nedelya Church bomb attack
38	10 June 1925	13 November 1925	Georgi Madzharov	shot on the street by a dismissed director
39	7 April 1926	14 March 1932	Gen. Vladimir Vazov	
40	14 March 1932	20 February 1933	Boyan Nachov	
41	20 February 1933	25 May 1934	Dr. Haralampi Oroshakov	
42	25 May 1934	9 September 1944	Ivan Ivanov	longest term; deposed during a coup d'état
43	10 September 1944	19 September 1944	Petar Slavinski	shortest term, 9 days
44	23 September 1944	22 March 1945	Prof. Aleksi Kvartirnikov	
45	22 March 1945	29 October 1945	Nikola Bronzov	
46	1 November 1945	2 March 1948	Slavcho Stoilov	
47	2 March 1948	27 May 1949	Prof. Dobri Radistilov	
48	27 May 1949	1 November 1949	Todor Zhivkov	
49	1 November 1949	22 December 1952	Dr. Ivan Pashov	
50	22 December 1952	7 September 1961	Dimitar Popov	
51	7 September 1961	20 September 1967	Georgi Petkov	
52	20 September 1967	11 November 1971	Georgi Stoilov	
53	11 November 1971	5 December 1977	Ivan Panev	
54	7 March 1978	15 April 1986	Petar Mezhdurechki	
55	15 April 1986	27 July 1990	Stefan Ninov	
56	17 October 1990	20 October 1991	Aleksandar Karakachanov	interim; Union of Democratic Forces
57	21 October 1991	18. November 1995	Prof. Alexander Yanchulev	first democratically elected mayor of Sofia; elected on 13 October 1991; Union of Democratic Forces
58	19 November 1995	29 June 2005	Stefan Sofiyanski	Union of Democratic Forces and Union of Free Democrats
59	30 June 2005	9 November 2005	Minko Gerdzhikov	interim
60	10 November 2005	29 July 2009	Boyko Borisov	Independent and GERB
61	29 July 2009	23 November 2009	Minko Gerdzhikov	interim; GERB
62	23 November 2009	13 November 2023	Yordanka Fandakova	first female mayor; GERB; the longest-serving mayor
63	13 November 2023		Vasil Terziev	

Mayor during the monarchy in Bulgaria (1878–1944)
Mayor in the People's Republic of Bulgaria (1944–1989)
Mayor in the Republic of Bulgaria (since 1989)

== See also ==
- List of mayors of Plovdiv
- List of mayors of Varna
- List of mayors of Pleven
- List of mayors of Veliko Tarnovo
