= Alexander Yanchulev =

Bulgarian politician and civil engineer (1938–2026)

- Александър Янчулев

Mayor of Sofia
- In office 21 October 1991 – 12 November 1995
- Preceded by: Aleksandar Karakachanov
- Succeeded by: Stefan Sofiyanski

Member of the 7th Grand National Assembly of Bulgaria
- In office 1990–1991

Personal details
- Born: 7 October 1938 Sofia, Kingdom of Bulgaria
- Died: 9 June 2026 (aged 87) Sofia, Bulgaria
- Party: Union of Democratic Forces
- Parent: Stefan Yanchulev (father)

Alexander Stefanov Yanchulev (Bulgarian: Александър Стефанов Янчулев; 7 October 1938 – 9 June 2026) was a Bulgarian politician, civil engineer, and academic. In October 1991, Yanchulev become the first democratically elected Mayor of Sofia, having won the capital city's first mayoral election. (Prior to 1991, all previous Sofia mayors had either been appointed or elected by the city's municipal councils). Yanchulev served as Sofia's mayor from 21 October 1991 until 18 November 1995 during Bulgaria's early transition to democracy following the 1989 fall of communism.

During his term as mayor, Yanchulev restored the coat of arms of Sofia which had been altered by the previous communist regime. He also adopted a new Sofia city flag depicting the restored coat of arms.

== Biography ==
=== Early life and academic career ===
Yanchulev was born in Sofia, Kingdom of Bulgaria, on 7 October 1938. His father, Stefan Yanchulev, was a journalist and publicist. He graduated from high school with an award for academic excellence and received his degree in hydraulic engineering in 1962 from the Civil Engineering Institute, which is now part of the present-day University of Architecture, Civil Engineering and Geodesy.

Yanchulev became a professor and university lecturer of hydraulic engineering and land reclamation for several decades. In 1965, he became a lecturer in the Department of Technology, Organization, and Economics of Construction at the University of Architecture. He was promoted to a professor at the University of Architecture in 1968, a position he held until his death in 2026. In 1973, he successfully defended his doctoral dissertation on damn construction at the Leningrad Polytechnic Institute, now known as the Peter the Great St. Petersburg Polytechnic University in Saint Petersburg, Russia.

Alexander Yanchulev was considered an expert water engineering and residential construction. Much of his work, which spanned the communist and post-communist eras, focused on construction in Sosia and the capital's surrounding metro area. For example, he worked and consulted on the construction on Sofia Airport, the city's main international airport.

Yanchulev authored more than 100 scholarly publications, textbooks, and other publications on construction management.

=== Political career ===
Alexander Yanchulev restored the coat of arms of Sofia during his tenure as mayor.

Yanchulev became active in politics following the fall of the People's Republic of Bulgaria communist government and initially joined the Bulgarian Agrarian National Union (BZNS) political party in 1989. He was elected to the 7th Grand National Assembly of Bulgaria, in the June 1990 Bulgarian Constitutional Assembly election as a candidate from the Union of Democratic Forces (SDS) coalition. As a member of the 7th Grand National Assembly, Alexander Yanchulev and his colleagues helped to write the new post-communist Constitution of Bulgaria, which was adopted on 12 July 1991.

In 1991, the Union of Democratic Forces (SDS) nominated Yanchulev the party's nominee for Mayor of Sosia for the first local elections since the end of the communist regime. Alexander Yanchulev was elected on 13 October 1991, becoming the city's first directly and democratically elected mayor in history. He served in the mayoral office from 21 October 1991 to 18 November 1995.

Yanchulev's tenure as mayor coincided with a severe nationwide financial crisis for Bulgaria and Sofia, as well as financial crunches on the municipal level. He also guided the capital city through a water crisis from 1994 to 1995, which required residential water rationing due to critically low water levels at the Iskar Reservoir.

Mayor Yanchulev restored the historic coat of arms of Sofia, which had been altered by the previous communist regime. He also oversaw the adoption of a new city flag of Sofia, which prominently features the restored coat of arms.

Yanchulev also adopted a new flag of Sofia.

On 25 March 1992, Mayor Yanchulev and the Sofia Municipal Council established 17 September - the feast day of Saints Faith, Hope and Charity and their mother, Sophia of Rome - as the official holiday of the city of Sofia.

In 2021, Yanchulev published his memoir, "No Makeup and Retouching", which recounts the challenges and major events of his mayorship. He also published several books and articles on the history of Sofia, including "Sofia in the Years of the Economic Crisis and the Struggle for Local Self-Government, 1991-1995" (София в годините на икономическата криза и борбата за местно самоуправление, 1991-1995).

Yanchulev died on 9 June 2026, at the age of 87.
