= University of Architecture, Civil Engineering and Geodesy =

Coordinates: 42°40′59″N 23°19′53″E

- Университет по Архитектура, Строителство и Геодезия
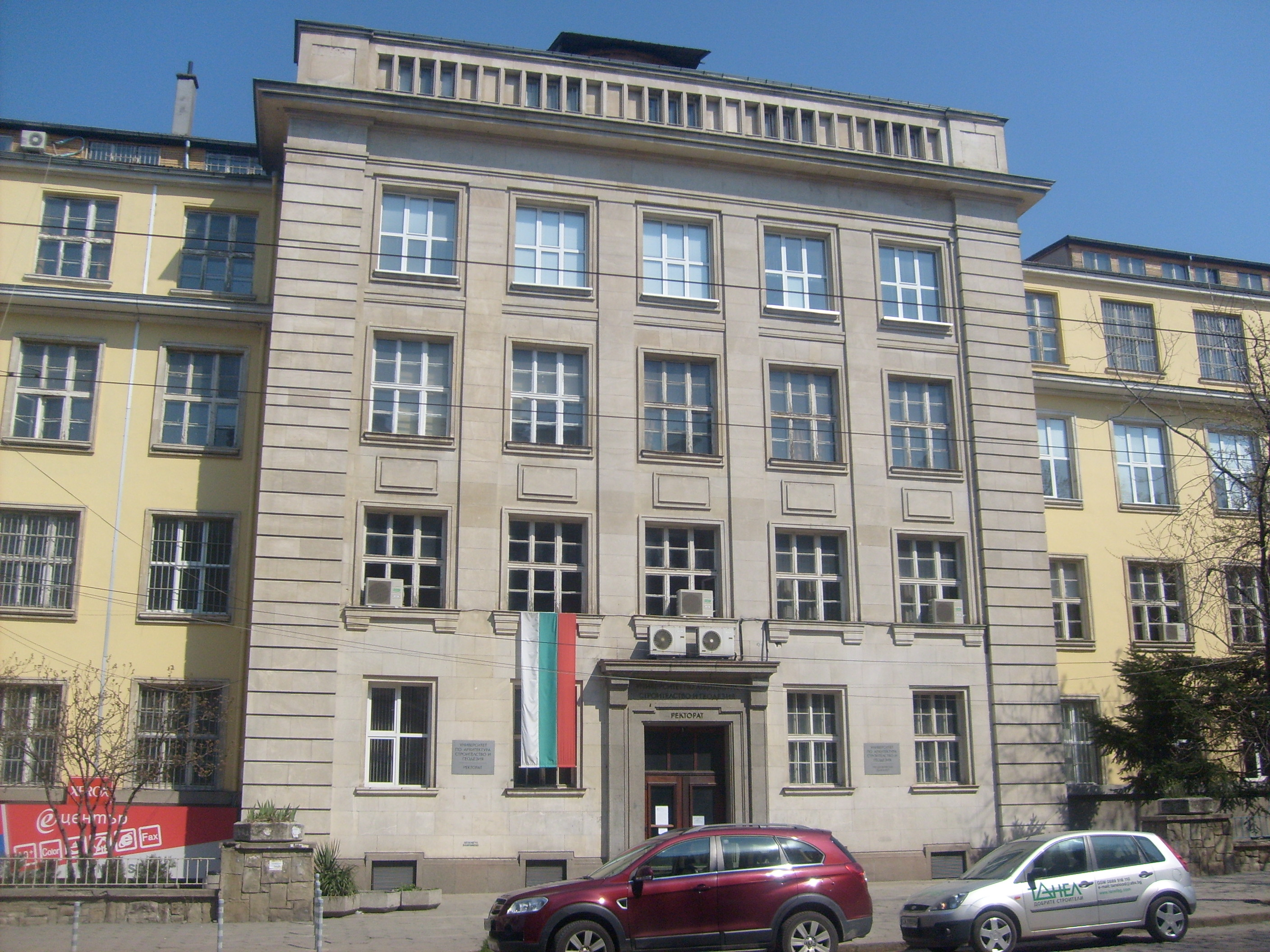
- Type: Public
- Established: 1942
- Affiliations: European Accreditation by FEANI
- Rector: prof. arch. Gichka Kutova-Kamenova, PhD
- Academic staff: 364
- Students: 5000
- Location: Sofia, Bulgaria
- Campus: Urban
- Website: uacg.bg

University rankings

Regional – Overall
- QS Emerging Europe and Central Asia: 351-400 (2022)

The University of Architecture, Civil Engineering and Geodesy is located in Sofia, Bulgaria.

It was founded in 1942 as a Higher Technical School following a decree issued on June 6, 1941, by the Bulgarian Tsar Boris III. In 1945 it was transformed into a State Polytechnic. In 1953 the Polytechnic was divided into several institutes one of them being the Institute of Civil Engineering. Since 1977 the institute is renamed Higher Institute of Architecture and Civil Engineering (HIACE). In 1990 by a decision of its General Assembly the institute was renamed University of Architecture, Civil Engineering and Geodesy (UACEG), the official accreditation being voted by the Parliament on 21 July 1995. On 15.11.2001 it received institutional accreditation.

== Faculties and departments ==
- Faculty of Architecture
- Faculty of Geodesy
- Faculty of Hydrotechnics
- Faculty of Structural engineering
- Faculty of Transportation engineering
- Department of applied linguistics and physical culture

== Rectors ==
=== Higher Technical School ===
- 1942–1944: Yurdan Danchov
- 1944–1945: Stancho Belkovski

=== State Polytechnic ===
- 1945–1946; Vasil Peevski
- 1946–1947: Aleksi Kvartirnikov
- 1947–1948: Georgi Bradistilov
- 1948–1951: Aleksi Kvartirnikov
- 1951–1953: Sazdo Ivanov

== Notable alumni ==
- Tzveta Kousseva, rhythmic gymnast
- Sisi Zlatanova, researcher in geospatial data, geographic information systems, and 3D modeling
- Yordan Ivov Terziyski Member of Bulgarian Parliament
- Alexander Yanchulev, politician and civil engineer, first democratically elected Mayor of Sofia (1991–1995)
