= Ivan Mrkvička =

Czech artist (1856–1938)

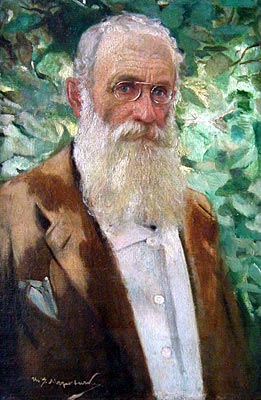
- Self-portrait (1926)
- Born: Jan Václav Mrkvička; 23 April 1856; Vidim, Bohemia
- Died: 16 May 1938 (aged 82); Prague, Czechoslovakia

Ivan Mrkvička (born Jan Václav Mrkvička, Bulgarian: Иван Мърквичка; 23 April 1856 – 16 May 1938) was an Austrian Empire-born painter and an active contributor to the artistic life of newly independent Bulgaria in the late 19th and early 20th century. He is regarded as one of the founders of the modern Bulgarian fine art tradition.

== Biography ==
Born in the village of Vidim near Mělník, he studied at the Academy of Fine Arts in Prague under professor Antonin Lhota and at the Munich Academy. Mrkvička came to Plovdiv in 1881 after an invitation by the then-Eastern Rumelian government and worked as a teacher in the Cyril and Methodius high school, where he co-operated with the most important cultural figures in the city — Ivan Vazov, Konstantin Velichkov, Petko Karavelov, Petko Slaveykov.

Mrkvička set up his first independent exhibition in 1886 and participated in two shared exhibitions with Anton Mitov, another teacher at the high school. During his Plovdiv period Mrkvička created some of his best known works: Plovdiv Marketplace (1883), Sakadzhii (1886), Gypsy Revelry (1887), Poulterer (1887), Marketplace in Plovdiv (1888) and others.

Mrkvička settled in Sofia in 1889 and was one of the founders of the National Academy of Art in 1896, but briefly returned to Plovdiv in 1892 to take part in a special exhibition in the Plovdiv Fair main pavilion. He there presented 15 paintings, including Street in Plovdiv, and a sculpture called Bulgaria — Patroness of Agriculture and Crafts. He was also the author of the exhibition's official poster.

The painter's most significant achievements are in the everyday life genre, although he also worked in the historic painting sphere and is the author of many high-quality portraits. One of the creators of the then-coat of arms of Bulgaria and the coat of arms of Sofia, he became a Bulgarian Academy of Sciences member in 1918.

One of his students was Bulgarian artist Vladimir Dimitrov, who studied under him from 1903 to 1910.

Mrkvička died in Prague on 16 May 1938.

== Selected paintings ==
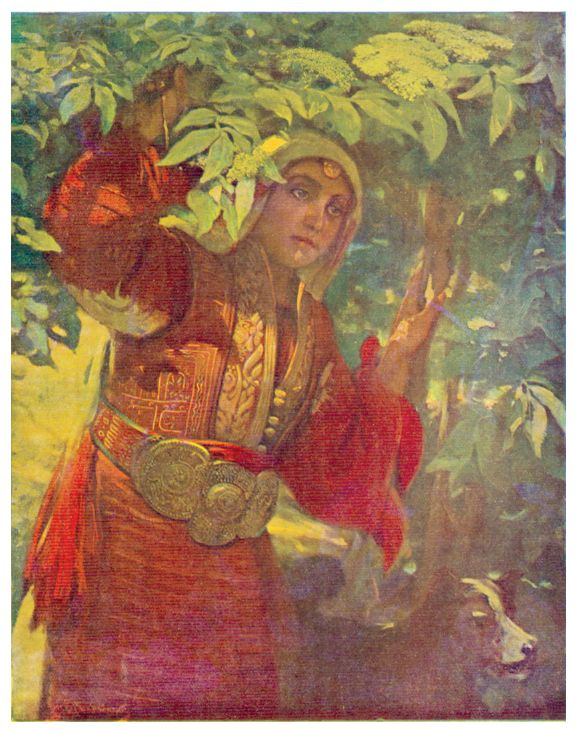
Bulgarian woman from Smilevo (1931)

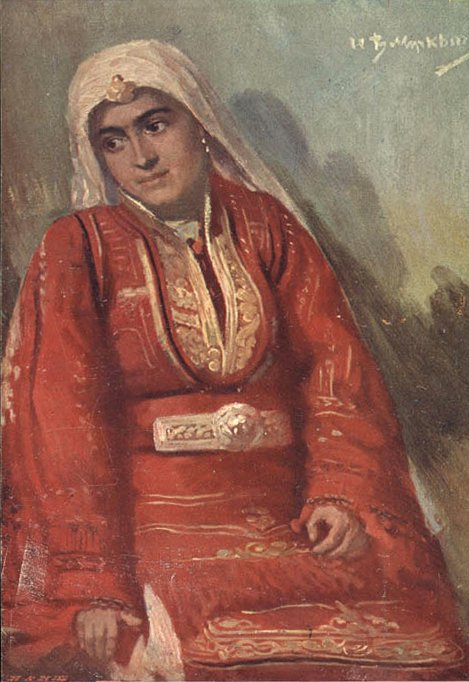
Bulgarian woman from Smilevo (1931)

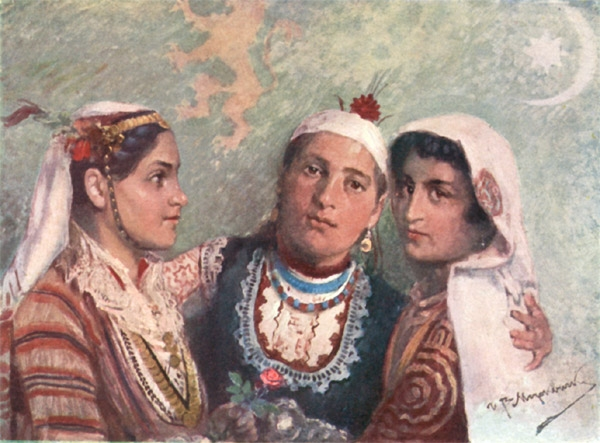
Three Sisters: Moesia, Thrace and Macedonia (1915)

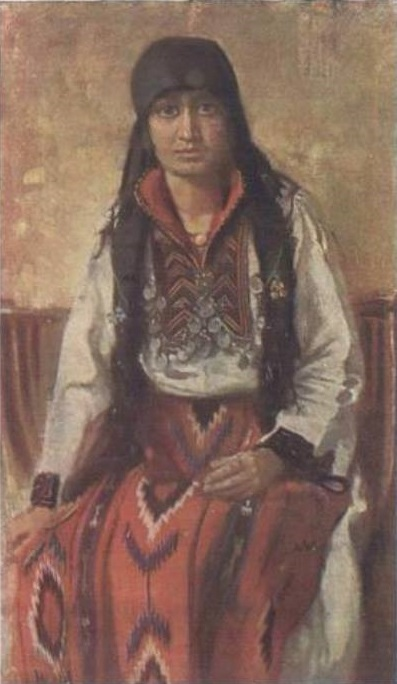
Maid from Radibush (1929)

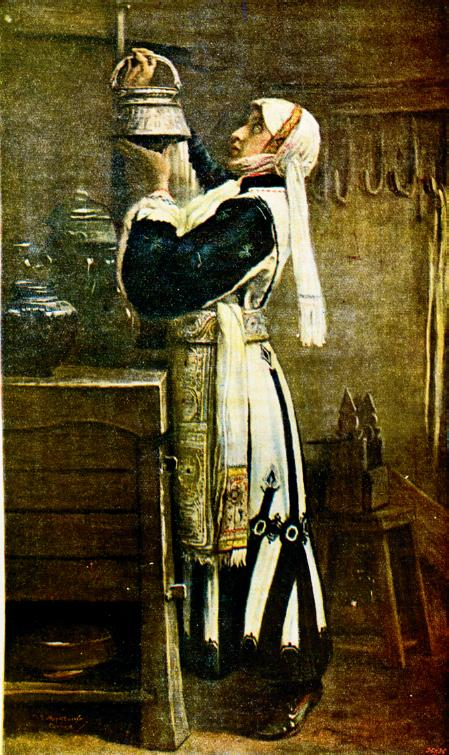
Bulgarian woman from Skopska Crna Gora (1931)

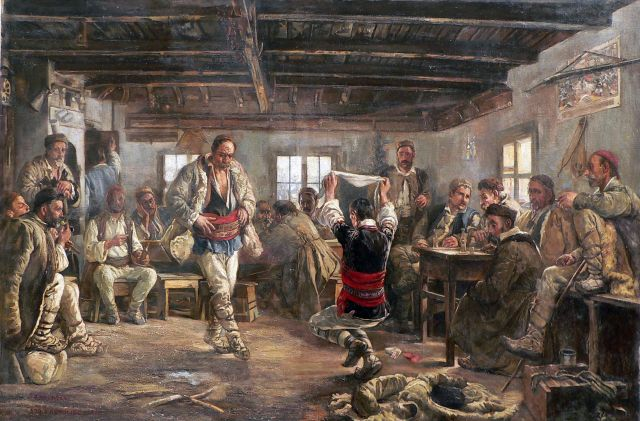
Rachenitsa (1894)

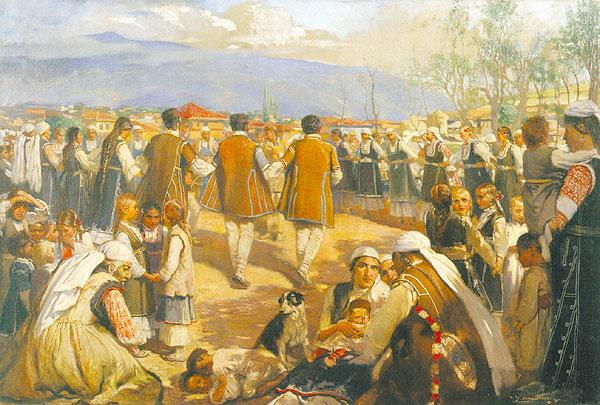
Shopsko Horo (1892)

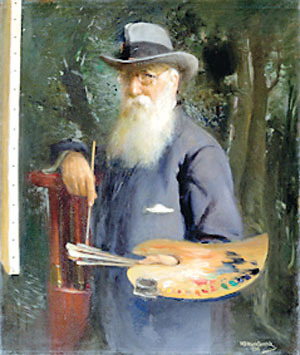
Self-portrait

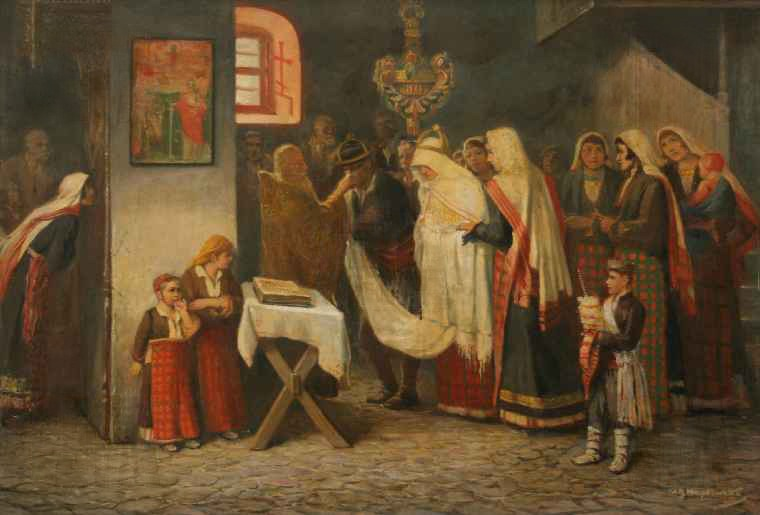
Wedding in Momchilovtsi

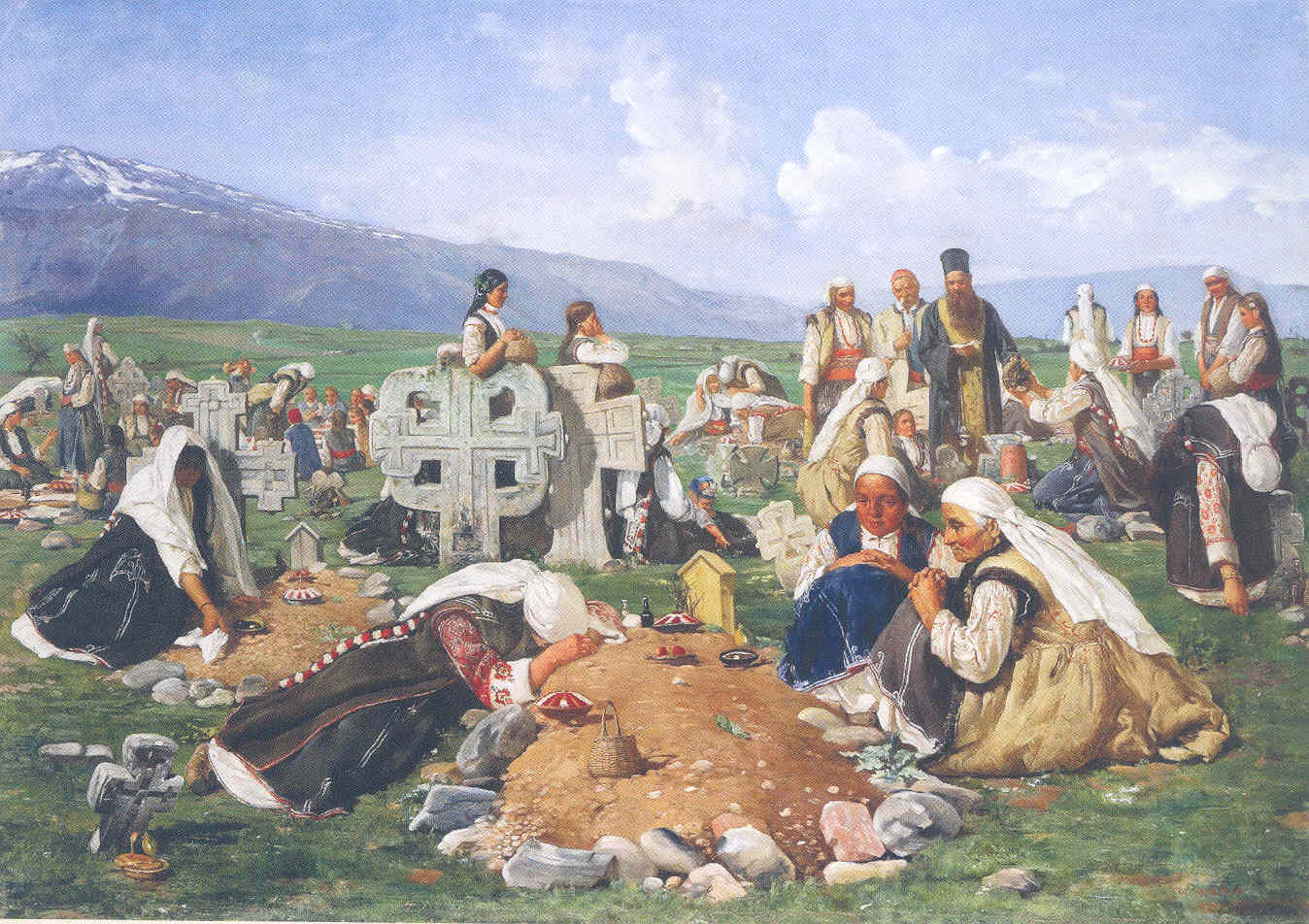
Zadushnitsa (1890)

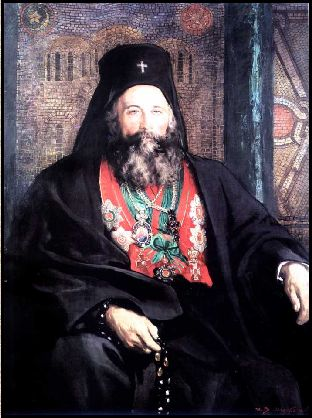
Joseph I of Bulgaria

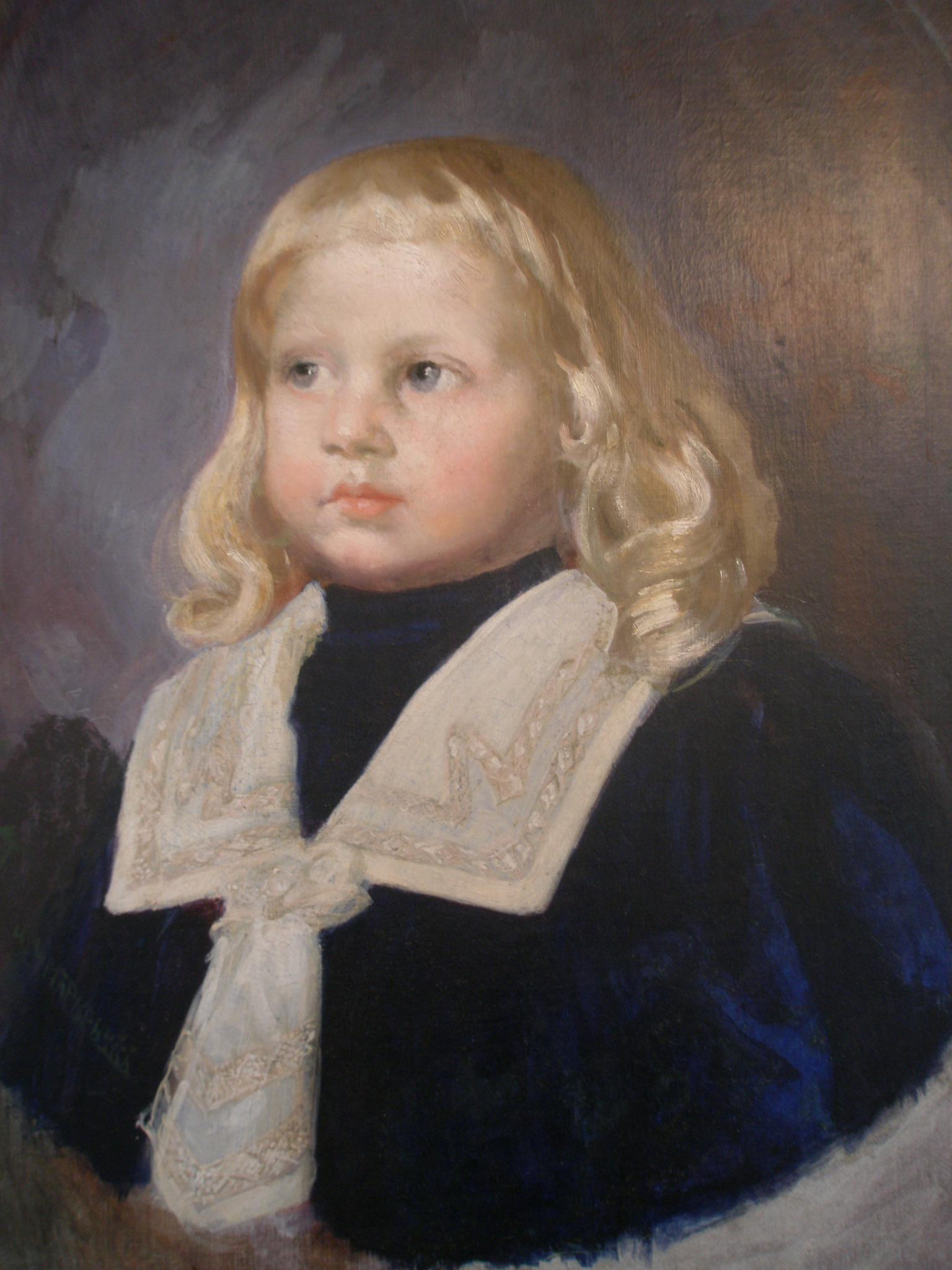
Child's portrait

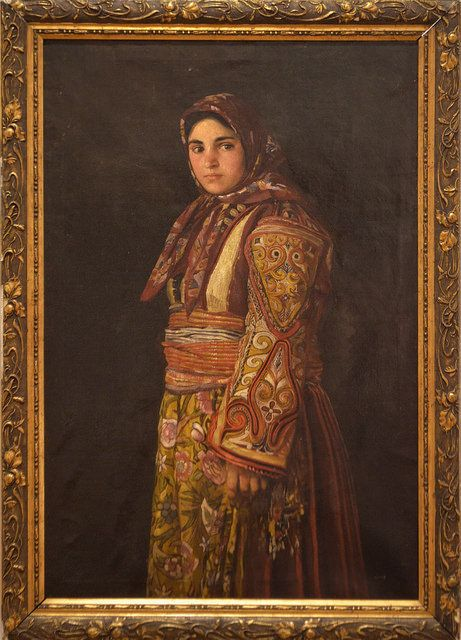
Radka Hadzhinikolova in a Macedonian Costume

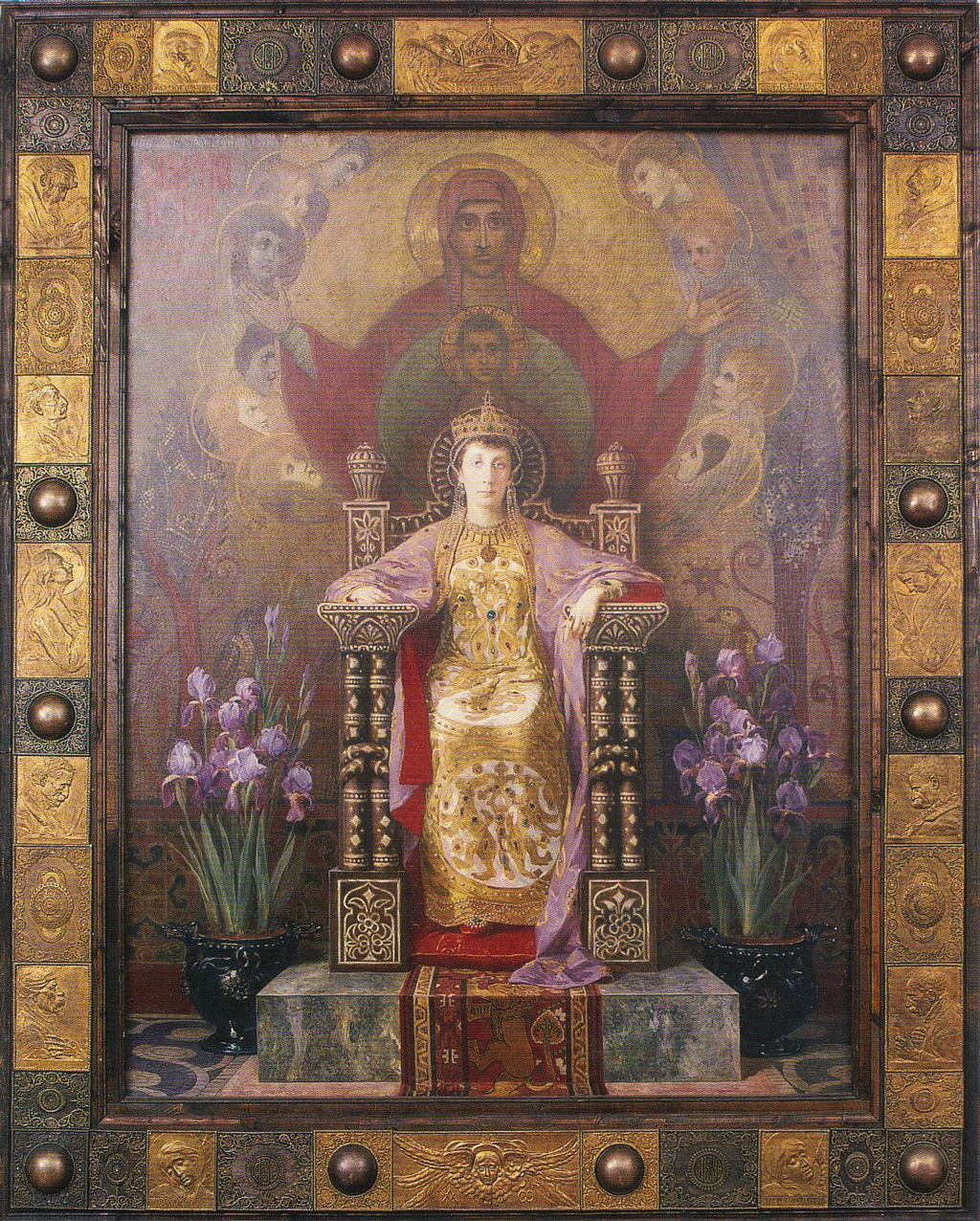
Portrait of Maria Louisa (1900)
