= Buzludzha monument =

Abandoned communist monument house in Bulgaria

- Паметник на Бузлуджа
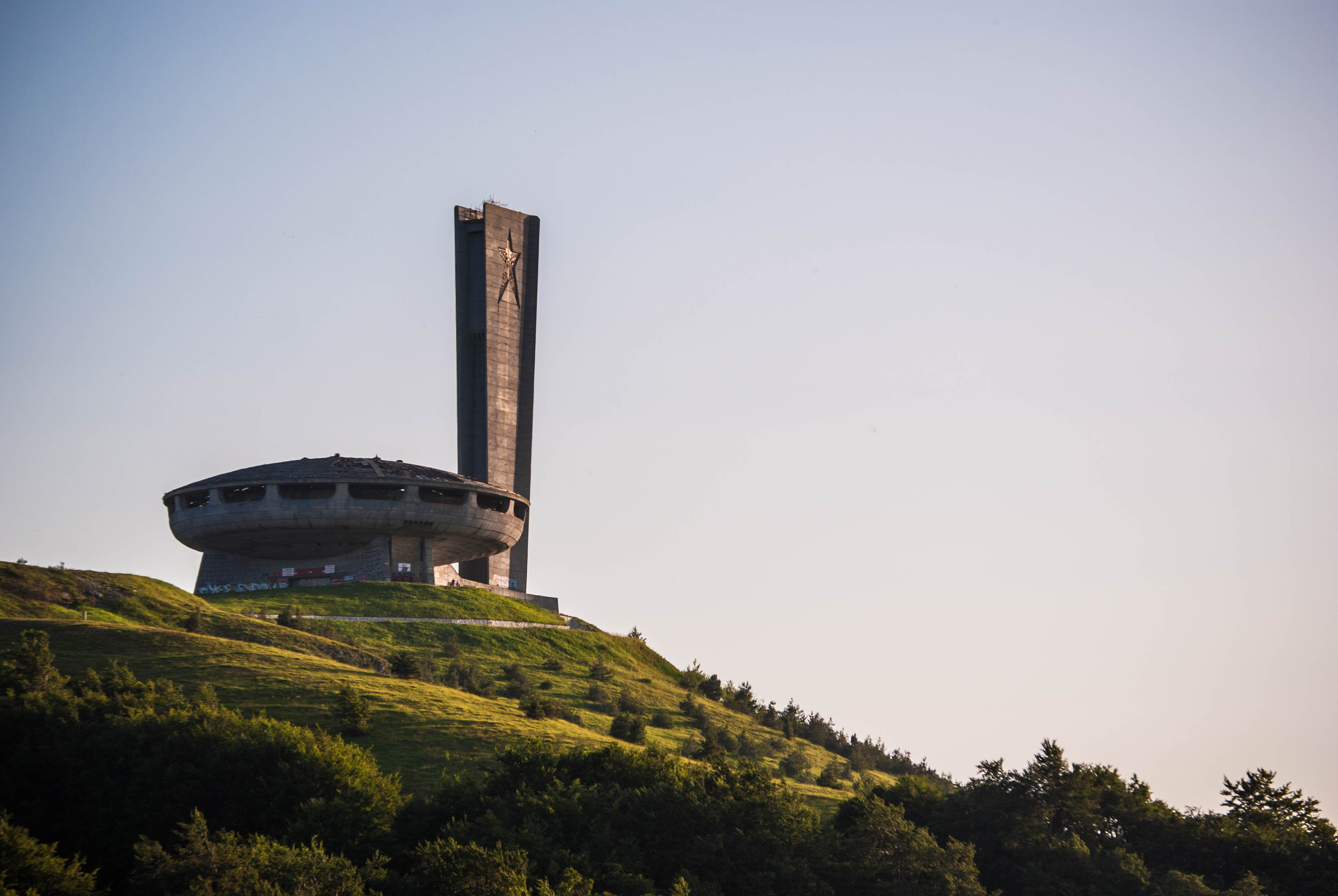
- Interactive map of Buzludzha monument
- Location: Buzludzha Peak, Bulgaria
- Coordinates: 42°44′N 25°23′E
- Designer: Georgi Stoilov
- Material: concrete, steel, glass
- Height: 70 metres (230 ft)
- Beginning date: 1974
- Completion date: 1981
- Opening date: 23 August 1981

The Monument House of the Bulgarian Communist Party (Bulgarian: Дом паметник на БКП, romanized: Dom pametnik na BKP), also known as the Buzludzha Monument (/ˈbʊzlʊdʒə/), was built on Buzludzha Peak in central Bulgaria by the Bulgarian communist government and inaugurated in 1981. It commemorated the events of 1891, when a group of socialists led by Dimitar Blagoev assembled secretly in the area to form an organized socialist movement that led to the founding of the Bulgarian Social Democratic Party, a forerunner of the Bulgarian Communist Party, itself a forerunner of the current Bulgarian Socialist Party.

== Construction ==
Construction of the monument began on 23 January 1974 under architect Georgi Stoilov, a former mayor of Sofia and co-founder of the Union of Architects in Bulgaria. The peak was leveled into a stable foundation using TNT, reducing the mountain's height from 1,441 metres (4,728 feet) to 1,432 metres (4,698 feet). Over 15,000 cubic metres of rock were removed in the process. The monument was built at a cost of 14,186,000 leva, equivalent to US $45.5 million in 2026.

The monument exemplifies the futurist architecture common to many state-constructed communist buildings. All maintenance ended with the fall of communism in 1989, and the building remains closed to the public due to the hazards of the weakened structure. The Buzludzha Project has helped to begin work on the monument's preservation, with the eventual aim of creating an interpretation center for Bulgarian history.

== Mosaics ==
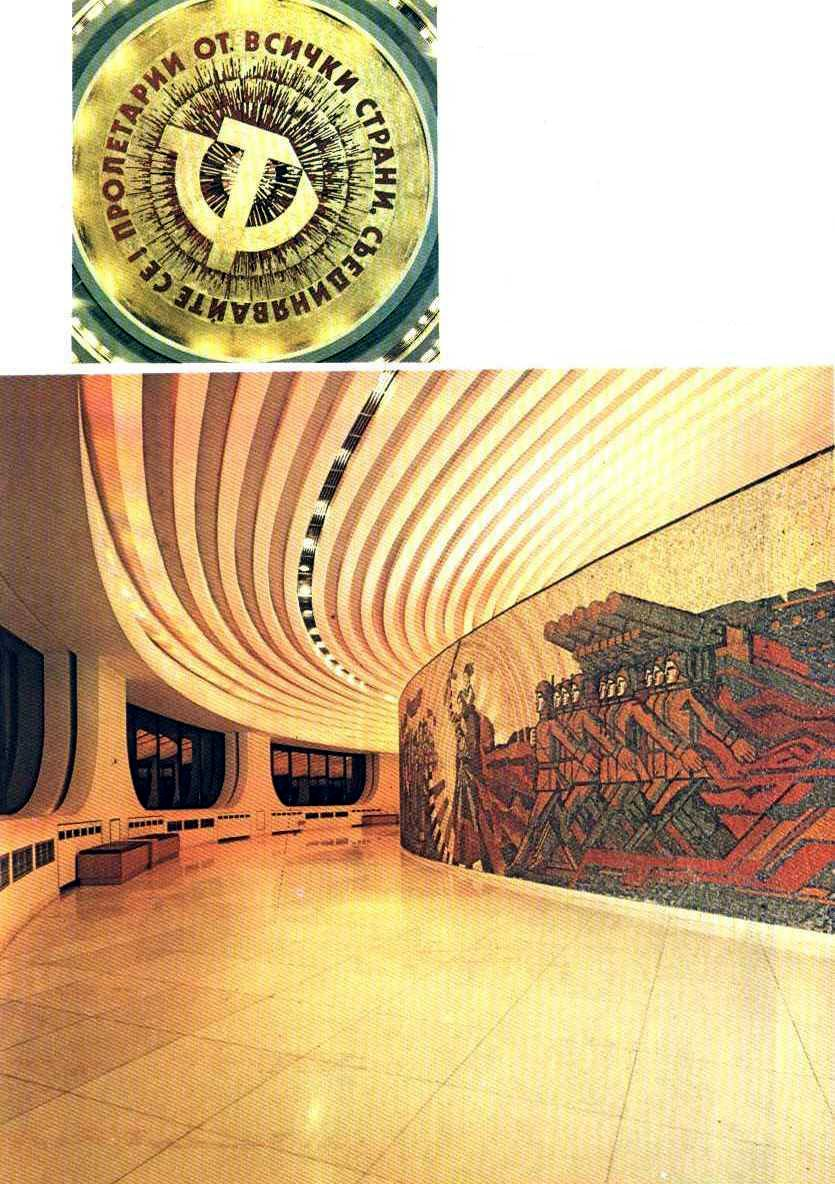
The interior of the monument in its early days.

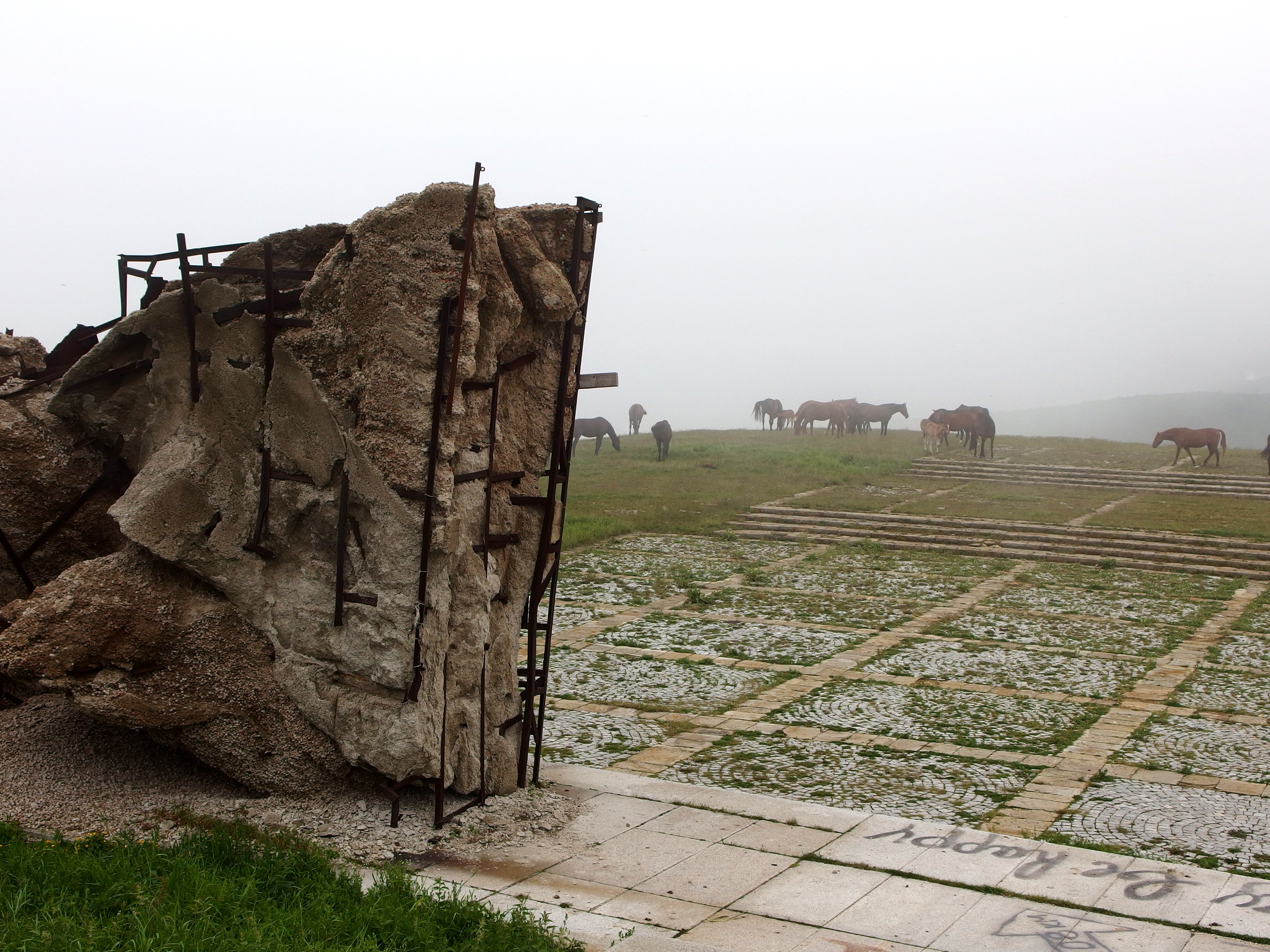
Destroyed torch monument

Inside the building, mosaics commemorating the history of the Bulgarian Communist Party cover approximately 937 square meters; 35 tons of cobalt glass were used in their manufacture. One-fifth of the mosaics have already been destroyed due to age, weather-related deterioration, and vandalism.

The largest mosaics were glorifying Vladimir Lenin and Karl Marx. The monument has a hall used for important celebrations of the Communist Party until the fall of communism in 1989. At the top of the monument’s hall, there was a star-shaped red window associated with communism. A corridor with 14 mosaics showed the labor of ordinary workers.

Mosaics on the outer ring of the monument were built with natural stones gathered from rivers across Bulgaria; these mosaics have mostly vanished due to natural wear.

The building's main ceiling mosaic features the communist hammer and sickle encircled with a Communist Manifesto quote, "Proletarians of all countries, unite!"

== Opening ceremony ==
The monument was opened on 23 August 1981. At the opening ceremony, Bulgarian communist leader Todor Zhivkov announced:

I am honoured to be in the historical position to open the House-Monument of the Bulgarian Communist Party, built in honour of the accomplishments of Dimitar Blagoev and his associates, who 90 years ago laid the foundations for the revolutionary Marxist Party in Bulgaria. Let the pathways leading here – to the legendary Buzludzha Peak, here in the Stara Planina where the first Marxists came to continue the work of sacred and pure love that was started by Bulgaria's socialist writers and philosophers – never fall into disrepair. Let generation after generation of socialist and communist Bulgaria come here, to bow down before the feats and the deeds of those who came before; those who lived on this land and gave everything they had to their nation. Let them feel that spirit that ennobles us and as we empathise with the ideas and dreams of our forefathers, so let us experience that same excitement today! Glory to Blagoev and his followers; those first disciples of Bulgarian socialism, who sowed the immortal seeds of today's Bulgarian Communist Party in the public soul!

== In popular culture ==
The Finnish rock band Haloo Helsinki! shot the entirety of the music video for their 2014 single "Vihaan kyllästynyt" at the monument; the Dutch rock band Kensington's 2015 "Riddles" music video was likewise entirely filmed on location there. The closing sequence of Rita Ora's Bang EP video was shot at the monument in early 2021.

The site was used as a filming location for the 2016 action movie Mechanic: Resurrection; special effects were added to show the structure next to a shoreline, with a helipad added to the top of the saucer building. The monument is visited by the main protagonist in the 2018 comedy film I Feel Good.

The 2019 opera Frankenstein by Mark Grey appears to take place inside the Buzludzha Monument.

== Access ==
Buzludzha can be reached by two side roads from the Shipka Pass, either a 16 km (10 mi) road from Kazanlak in the south or a 12 km (7 mi) road from Gabrovo on the north side of the mountain. The road in the south (Kazanlak) is in better condition than the other one as of October 2023.

== Preservation ==
Multiple initiatives to preserve the monument had been undertaken throughout the years, most of them political and associated with the Bulgarian Socialist Party. In 2018, the monument was recognized by Europa Nostra as one of the seven most endangered heritage sites in Europe. The most recent preservation works started in 2019 under the Buzludzha Project Foundation, in collaboration with ICOMOS Germany and the municipality of Stara Zagora. Together they were able to secure a $185,000 Getty Foundation grant to establish a Conservation Management Plan for the monument. Early results indicated that the building could be preserved and used, leading to a second Getty grant in July 2020 to stabilize surviving mosaic panels. Conservation and preservation efforts are ongoing.

The monument as of 2014

Monument seen from the air

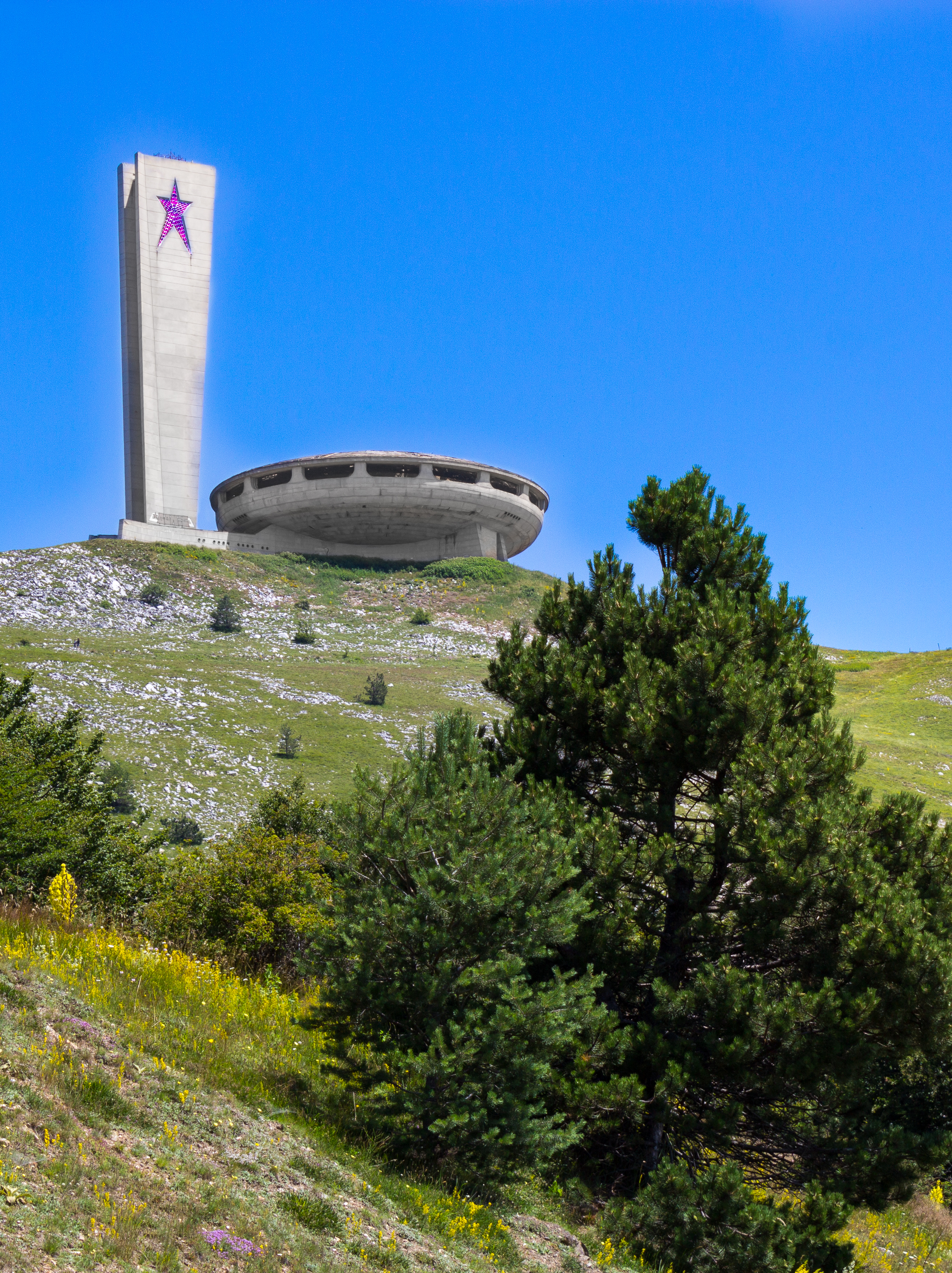
View from below

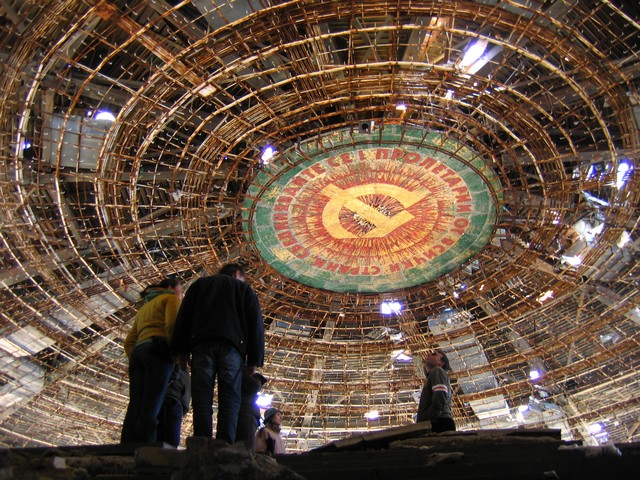
Dome

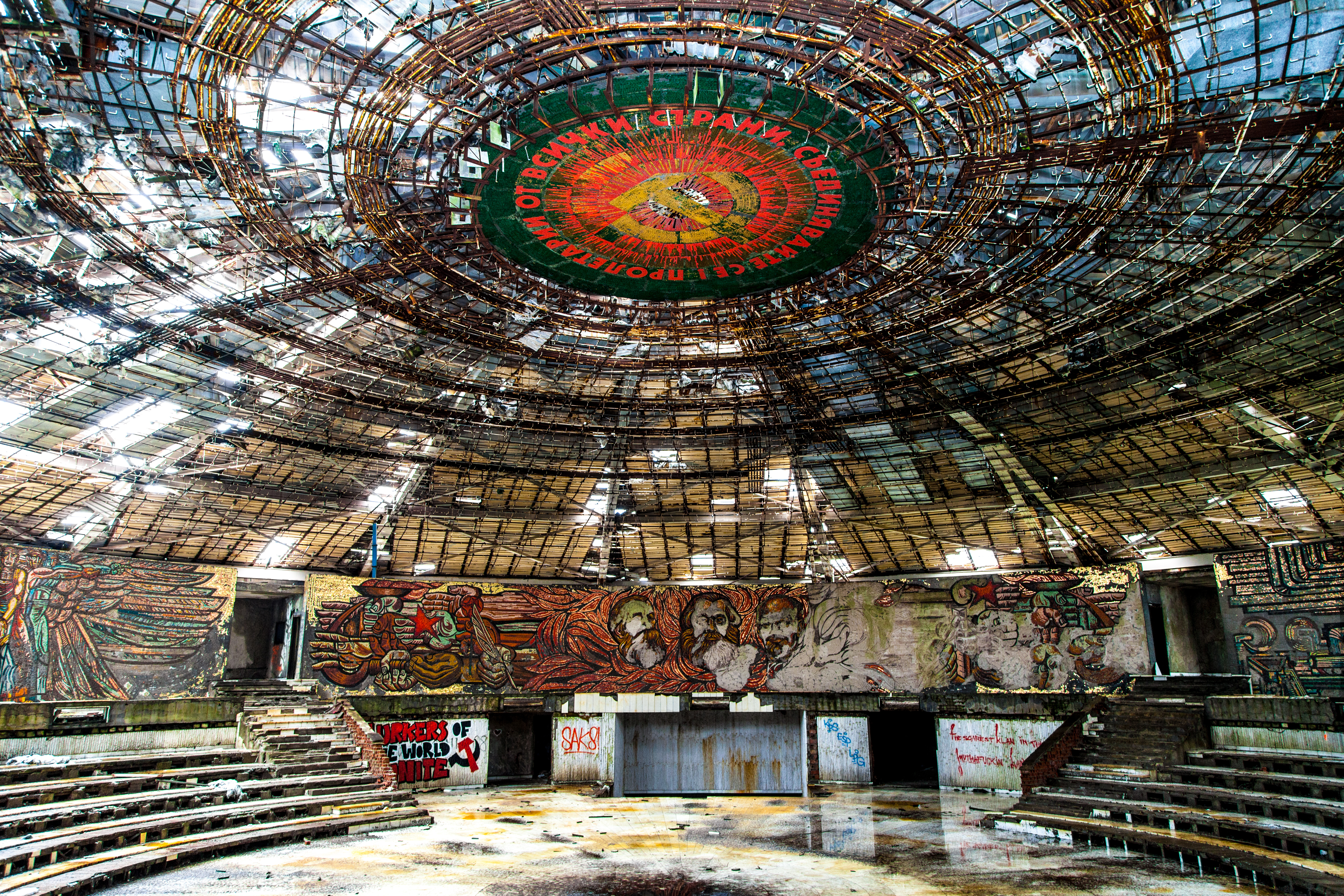
Auditorium

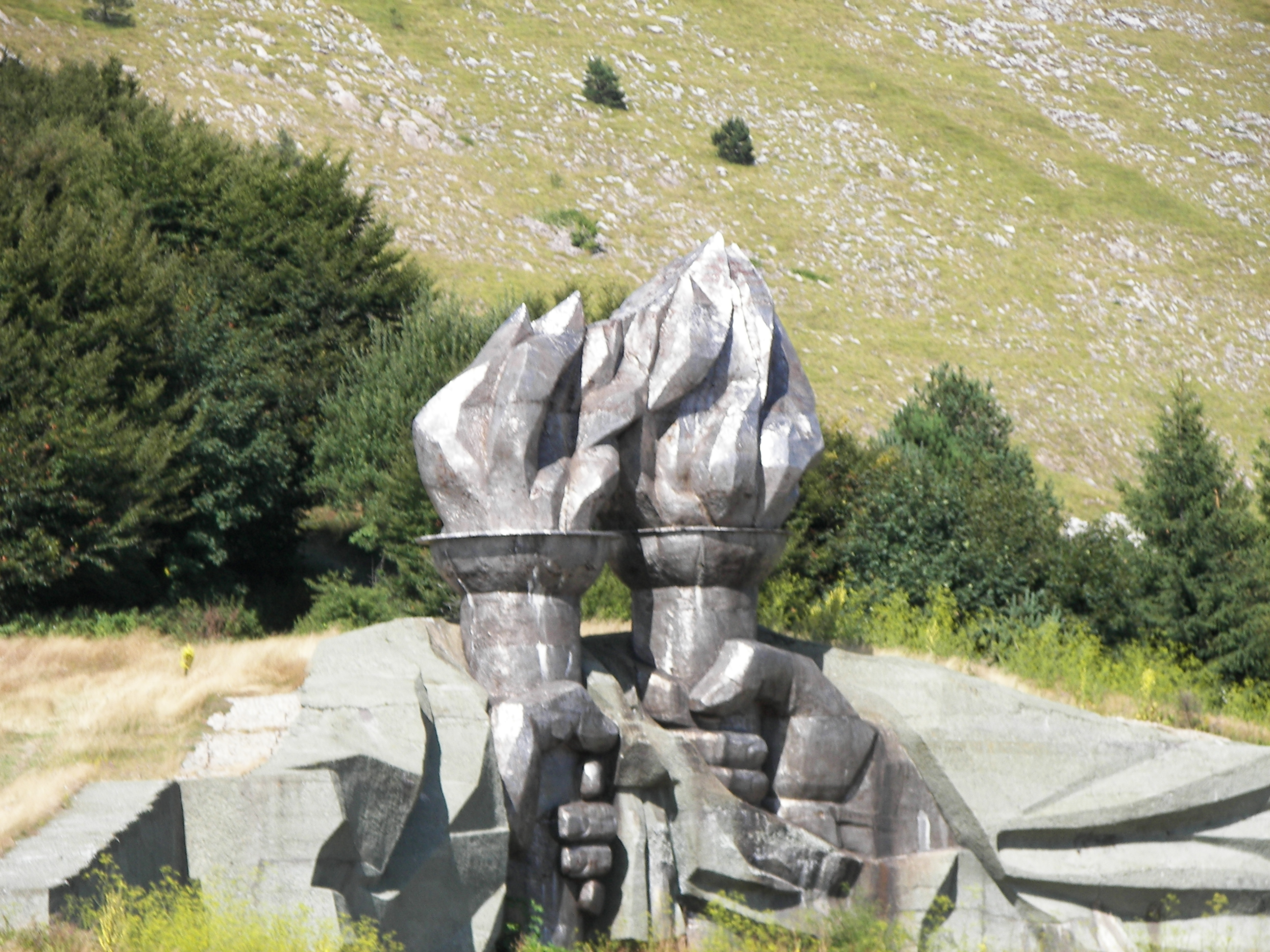
Torch monument

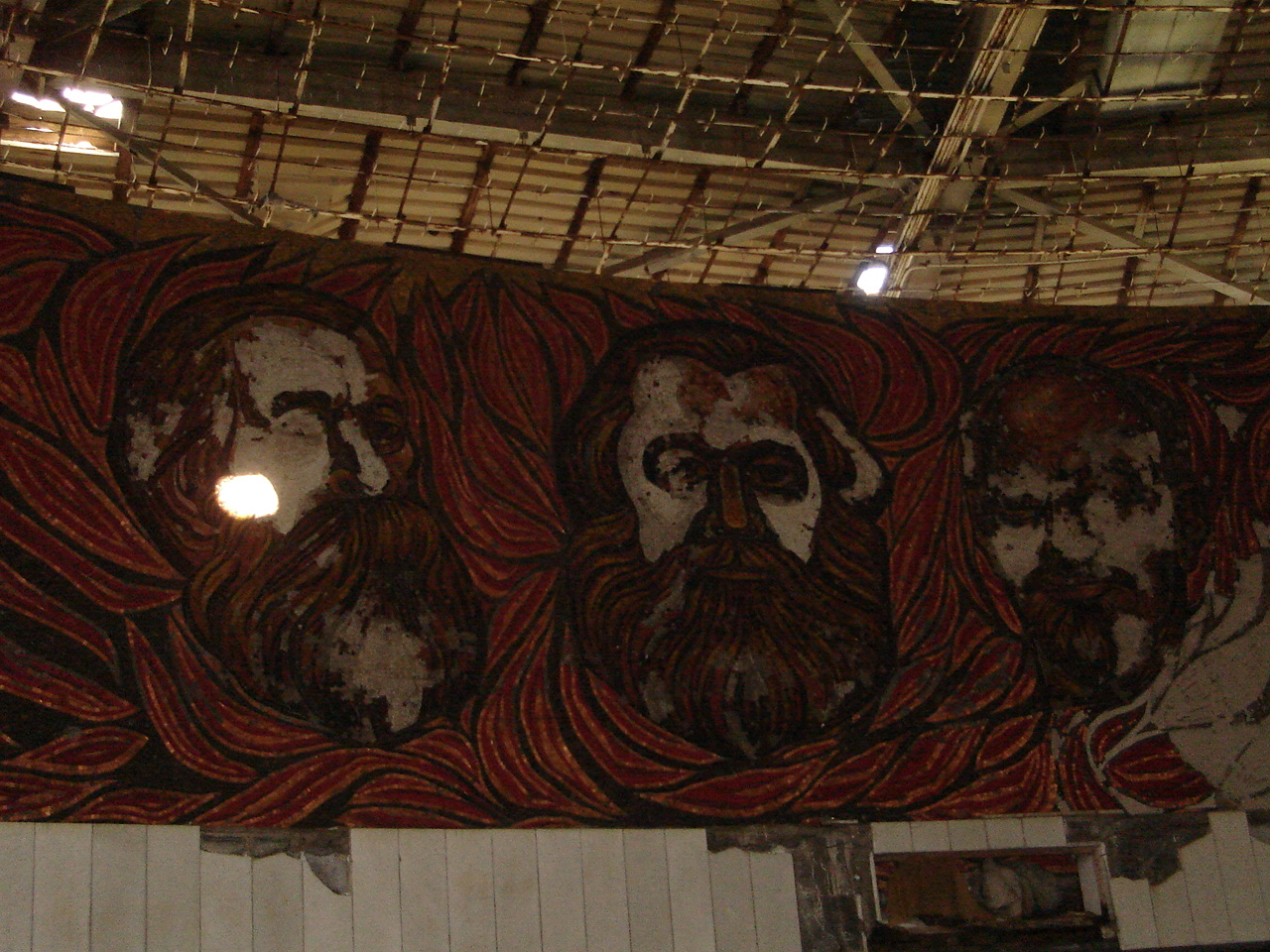
From left to right, mosaics of Friedrich Engels, Karl Marx and Vladimir Lenin

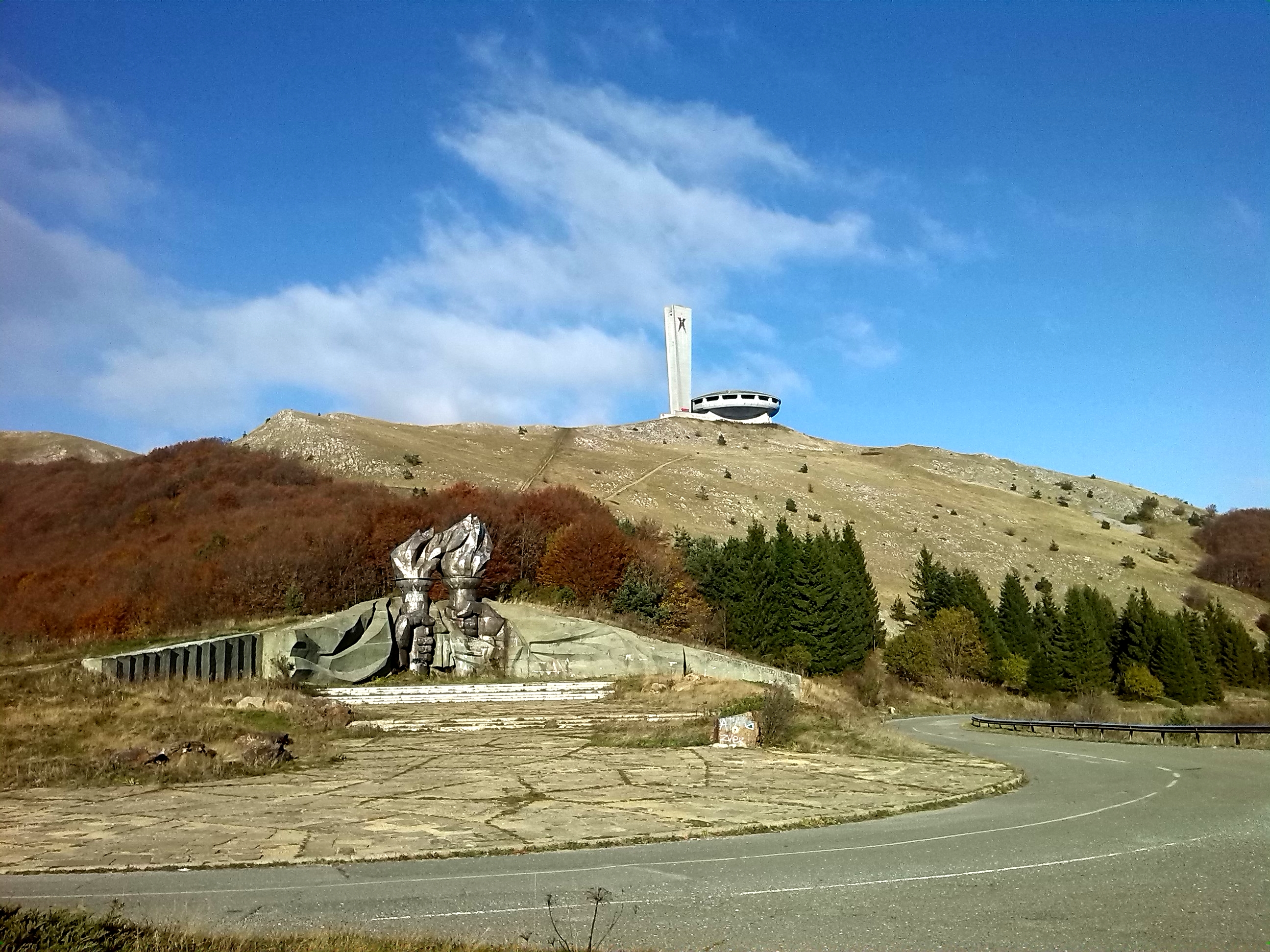
Torch and Buzludzha monuments

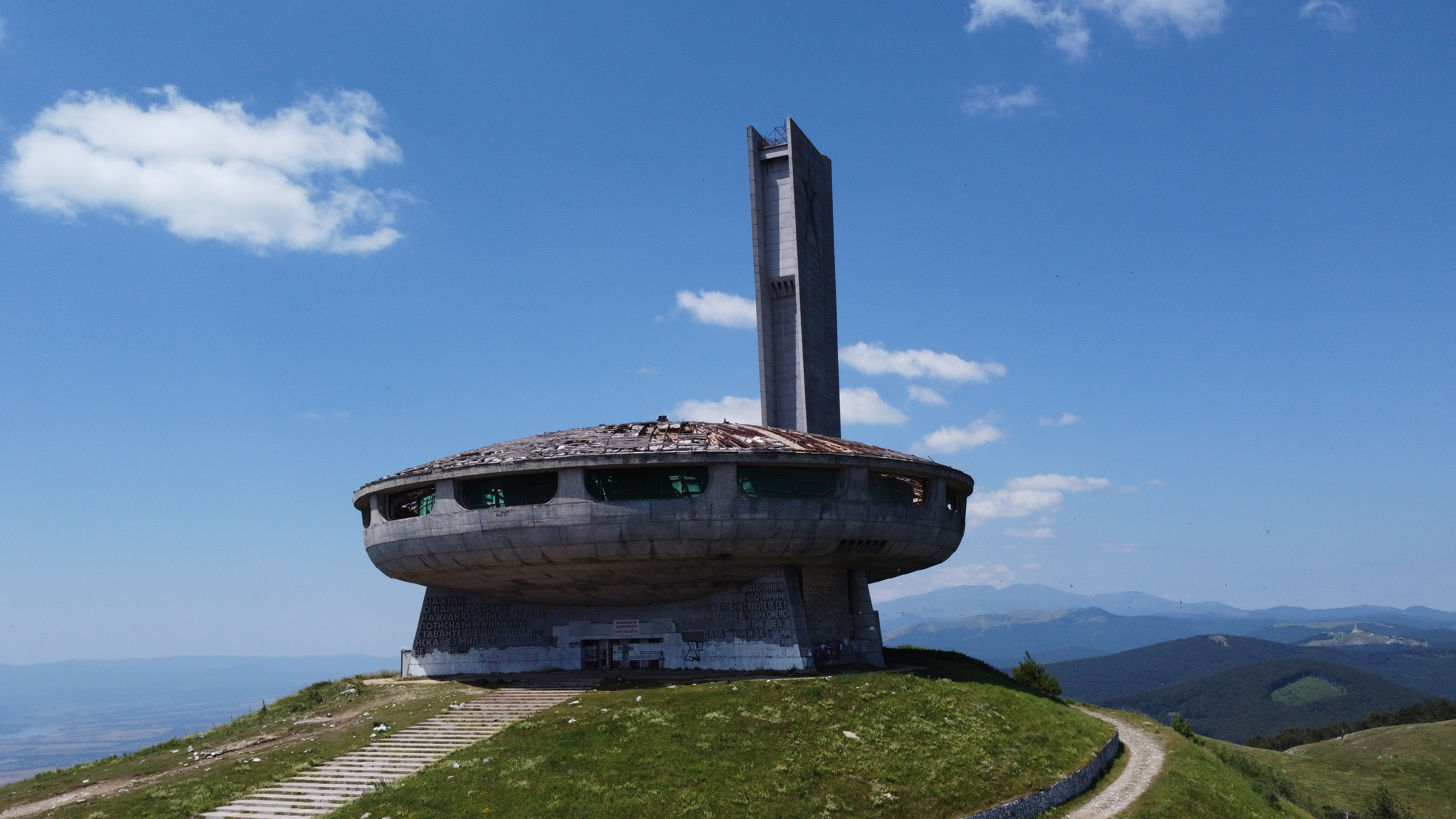
Drone view

== See also ==
- Bulgarka Nature Park

== Bibliography ==
- Adrien Minard, Bouzloudja. Crépuscule d'une utopie, Paris, éditions B2, 2018.
