= Ecoglasnost =

Bulgarian environmental organisation

Ecoglasnost Political Club Политически клуб „Екогласност“
- Leader: Emil Georgiev
- Founders: Peter Slabakov; Petar Beron; Aleksandar Karakachanov; Hristo Smolenov
- Founded: 11 April 1989
- Registered: 23 April 1990
- Headquarters: Sofia, zh.k. Mladost, bl. 309
- Ideology: Green politics Environmentalism
- Political position: Centre-left
- National affiliation: BSP for Bulgaria
- Colours: Green
- National Assembly: 0 / 240
- European Parliament: 0 / 17

Website
- ekoglasnost.bg

Ecoglasnost (Bulgarian: Екогласност), also known as Independent Society of Ecoglasnost (Bulgarian: Независимо сдружение Екогласност), is an independent Bulgarian environmental organization, established on 11 April 1989 and formally registered on 11 December 1989. Ecoglasnost became a founding member of the umbrella opposition movement Union of Democratic Forces on 7 December 1989, and gave rise to the Green Party of Bulgaria on 28 December 1989, the Political Club of Ecoglasnost in March 1990, and the National Movement of Ecoglasnost on 15 June 1991.

Focusing its activities on several major environmental, human rights and political issues, the organization rapidly gained public support to become the leading opposition to the Communist Party:

Recognized for its environmental mission, Prescott College is now applauding Eco-glasnost for its environmental and world peace efforts. ... This weekend in Tucson, the college presented its first Prescott College Environmental Award. The award was given to Dimitrina Petrova, a member of the steering committee of Eco-glasnost. ... For the past 44 years, Bulgaria had been without political dissent. Eco-glasnost changed that. The group now is the leading opposition to the Communist Party, but unlike the bloody struggles now leading many foreign countries into political reform, Bulgarians are taking a more peaceful road to freedom. ... What started in November as 110 Bulgarian environmentalists protesting what they called a possible environmental disaster caused by two government projects, later escalated into the peaceful fall of the communist Bulgarian government.

In particular, Ecoglasnost organized public petitions, lobbying and demonstrations against the controversial projects of diverting Struma and Mesta Rivers waters to the north, and building the Belene Nuclear Power Plant. Position papers and reports on these issues and on the preservation of Bulgarian nature heritage were disseminated as samizdat, made available to domestic and Western media, and submitted to national authorities as well as to the 35-nation CSCE Meeting on the Protection of the Environment held in Sofia from 16 October to 3 November 1989.

Ecoglasnost played an important role in the political process that lead to the regime change marked by the downfall of the longtime communist ruler Todor Zhivkov on 10 November 1989, paving the way to the restoration of democracy and market economy in Bulgaria:

On November 3, Ecoglasnost delivered the crucial blow to the Communist political system. ... At least 10,000 people came and marched to parliament, carrying posters and chanting the word ‘democracy’. It was a crucial breakthrough ... Just a week following the Ecoglasnost march, Zhivkov was sacked ...

Meanwhile, Bulgaria took a significant step yesterday towards legalizing the country's biggest opposition group, Ecoglasnost. ... Ten days ago Ecoglasnost a pro-reform ecology movement rallied more than 4,000 supporters in Sofia for the first unofficial demonstration to be authorized since Bulgaria came under communist rule.
