= Hristo Smolenov =

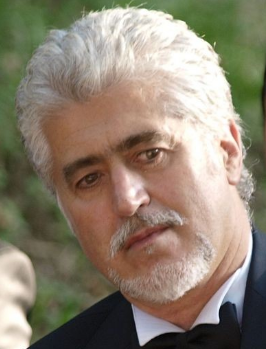
- Assoc. Prof. Dr. Hristo Smolenov
- Born: 1954 (age 71–72); Plovdiv, Bulgaria
- Education: Moscow State University; University of Montreal; Catholic University of America
- Known for: The Lost Aurolithic Civilization; Varna Civilization
- Scientific career
- Fields: Logics
- Workplaces: Bulgarian Academy of Sciences
- Website: smolenov.com

Hristo Smolenov is a Bulgarian scientist, logician and antiterrorism expert, born 1954 in Plovdiv, Bulgaria. In 2007 was revealed as associated with the communist secret services.

== Academic career ==
After graduating from the Moscow State University he became a guest professor at the University of Montreal and at the Catholic University of America in Washington. He is an associate professor at the Bulgarian Academy of Sciences. As a specialist in logic and methodology of science he has long been involved in creative solutions in non-standard situations.

=== Books and publications ===
- Codes in Space, 2016
- Zagora - Varna - the hidden super-culture, 2012
- The Lost Aurolithic Civilization? Codes from a Black Sea Atlantis, 2010
- Self-Producing Terror, 2005
- The Market Life of Global Terrorism, 2004
- The Cannibals Paradox: Global Terrorism and Hyper-Capital, 2003
- Struktur und Dynamik wissenschaftlicher Theorien: Beiträge zur Wissenschaftsgeschichte und Wissenschaftstheorie aus der bulgarischen Forschung, 1990
- Zeno's paradoxes and temporal becoming in dialectical atomism, 1984
- Truthfulness and non-trivial contradiction, 1984

== Political career ==
Smolenov initiated the creation of Independent Society of Ecoglasnost in 1988, which later became a founding member of the umbrella opposition movement Union of Democratic Forces. Between 1995-1997 he was the Parliamentary Secretary of the Bulgarian Ministry of Defense. In 1999 Smolenov was elected for MP in the 38th Bulgarian National Assembly.

== Awards and achievements ==
In 2017 Smolenov was honored with the title Honorary Professor of the Nikola Vaptsarov Naval Academy.
