= Yordan Ivov Terziyski =

Bulgarian architect and politician (born 1984)

Yordan Terziyski
- Йордан Ивов Терзийски
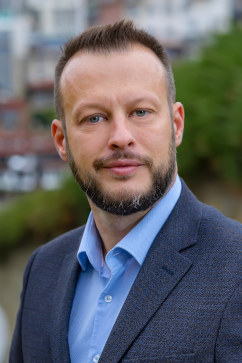
- Yordan Terziyski in the 47th National Assembly
- Born: Yordan Ivov Terziyski; February 7, 1984 (age 42); Sofia, People's Republic of Bulgaria
- Education: University of Architecture, Civil Engineering and Geodesy
- Occupations: Architect; Politician
- Political party: We Continue the Change

Member of the National Assembly of Bulgaria
- Incumbent
- Assumed office 2021
- Constituency: 4th MMC – Veliko Tarnovo; 24th MMC – Sofia-city

Yordan Ivov Terziyski (Bulgarian: Йордан Ивов Терзийски; born 7 February 1984) is a Bulgarian architect and politician. He is a member of the political party We Continue the Change, a centrist, anti-corruption political party and has served as a Member of the National Assembly in the 47th,48th, 50th and the present 52nd National_Assembly_(Bulgaria) of April 2026 He completed his primary education at Emiliyan Stanev School and his secondary education at the Vasil Drumev Mathematics High School in Veliko Tarnovo. Yordan was born into an architectural family, his father, Ivo Terziyski is a distinguished architect who served as Chief Architect of Veliko Tarnovo in 2011.. Yordan earned a master's degree in architecture from the University of Architecture, Civil Engineering and Geodesy (UACEG) in Sofia.

He later completed additional training in political management at New Bulgarian University and participated in programs on microeconomics and competitiveness at Sofia University.

== Career ==
Before entering politics, Terziyski worked as an architect for more than fifteen years, focusing on residential and public buildings, interior design, and urban development projects. His professional interests include sustainable urban planning and smart city development. Terziyski entered politics as a founding member of We Continue the Change. He was elected to the 47th National Assembly from the 4th Multi-member Constituency (Veliko Tarnovo). During his term, he served as Deputy Chairperson of the Committee on Regional Policy, Public Works and Local Self-Government.

In September 2023 Terziyski discussed the` politicization of the grain growers' protest` in an interview on Bulgarian National Television (BNT). In 2024 , he was interviewed by BNT again on the caretaker government `in which the long arm of the MRF is visible. GERB failed to implement six consecutive mandates for the formation of a regular government and currently, together with the MRF, they want and will govern through a caretaker cabinet.`

In June 2024, he gave an interview to Nova (Bulgarian TV channel) affirming that `constitutional amendments have a real effect` on local elections, economic policy and the political strategy of We Continue the Change.

Since the Bulgarian parliamentary elections of November 2021, Terziyski has been chosen and as the representative for "We Continue the Change" and retains his position as the representative for 4th Multi-member Constituency Veliko Tarnovo

== Other activities ==
Terziyski is a co-founder of the first Bulgarian wheelchair basketball team, Sofia-Balkan.His personal interests include painting, improvisational theatre, and creative writing. Terziyski is fluent in Bulgarian, English and German.

== Personal life ==
Terziyski has two sons.
