= Sisi Zlatanova =

- Education: University of Architecture, Civil Engineering and Geodesy; Graz University of Technology (PhD)
- Scientific career
- Fields: Geographic information systems; 3D modeling
- Institutions: University of New South Wales
- Thesis: 3D GIS for Urban Development

Sisi Zlatanova is a Bulgarian/Dutch researcher in geospatial data, geographic information systems, and 3D modeling. She works as a professor in the faculty of the Built Environment, at the University of New South Wales (UNSW), and is president of Technical Commission IV (Spatial Information Science) of the International Society for Photogrammetry and Remote Sensing.

== Education and career ==
Zlatanova studied surveying at the University of Architecture, Civil Engineering and Geodesy in Bulgaria. She completed her Ph.D. in 2000 at Graz University of Technology; her dissertation was 3D GIS for Urban Development, and was jointly promoted by Franz W. Leberl and Klaus Tempfli.

She has worked as a computer programmer for the Bulgarian Central Cadastre, and as an academic at the University of Architecture, Civil Engineering and Geodesy, at Graz University of Technology, at ITC Enschede, at the Siberian State University of Geosystems and Technologies in Novosibirsk, and at the Delft University of Technology, from 2000 until her move to UNSW in 2018.

At UNSW, she is the head of the Geospatial Research Innovation and Development lab (GRID). Her research there includes building 3D city models and digital twins of the university and urban areas.
