= Ivan Ivanov =

Ivan Ivanov may refer to:

== Sports ==
- Ivan Ivanov (archer) (born 1956), Bulgarian archer
- Ivan Ivanov (badminton) (born 1966), Bulgarian badminton player
- Ivan Ivanov (cross-country skier) (born 1987), Russian cross-country skier
- Ivan Ivanov (cyclist) (born 1960), Soviet racing cyclist
- Ivan Ivanov (footballer, born 1942) (1942–2006), Bulgarian international footballer
- Ivan Ivanov (footballer, born 1988), Bulgarian footballer
- Ivan Ivanov (footballer, born 1989), Bulgarian footballer
- Ivan Ivanov (gymnast) (born 1974), Bulgarian gymnast
- Ivan Ivanov (runner) (born 1948), Soviet middle-distance runner
- Ivan Ivanov (shot putter) (born 1992), Kazakhstani shot putter
- Ivan Ivanov (sport shooter) (born 1921), Bulgarian Olympic shooter
- Ivan Ivanov (swimmer) (born 1979), Kyrgyzstani swimmer
- Ivan Ivanov (triathlete) (born 1989), Ukrainian triathlete
- Ivan Ivanov (tennis) (born 2008), Bulgarian tennis player
- Ivan Ivanov (volleyball) (born 1950), Bulgarian volleyball player
- Ivan Ivanov (weightlifter) (born 1971), Olympic weightlifter for Bulgaria
- Ivan Ivanov (wrestler, born 1937) (1937–2010), Bulgarian Olympic wrestler
- Ivan Ivanov (wrestler, born 1968), Bulgarian Olympic wrestler
- Ivan Ivanov (wrestler, born 1986), Bulgarian Greco-Roman wrestler

== Other ==
- Ivan Ivanov (mathematician) (1862–1939), Russian-Soviet mathematician
- Ivan Ivanov (mayor) (1891–1965), Bulgarian engineer and politician
- Ivan Ivanov Bagryanov (1891–1945), Prime Minister of Bulgaria
- Ivan Ivanov-Vano (1900–1987), Soviet animator
- Ivan Ivanov (singer) (born 2000), Bulgarian child singer and songwriter
- Ivan Ivanov (politician, born 1975), Bulgarian politician
