= Ivan Ivanov (mayor) =

Bulgarian mayor

- Иван Иванов
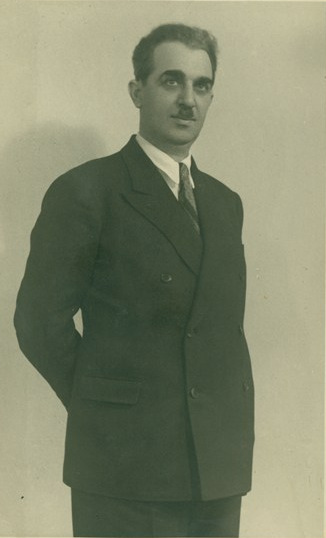
- Ivan Ivanov in 1943
- Born: 2 July 1891; Sliven, Principality of Bulgaria, Ottoman Empire
- Died: 20 June 1965 (aged 73); Sofia, PR Bulgaria
- Occupation: Engineer
- Known for: Mayor of Sofia 1934-44

Ivan Nikolov Ivanov (Bulgarian: Иван Николов Иванов) (1891–1965) was a Bulgarian engineer and the second longest serving Mayor of Sofia (25 May 1934 – 9 September 1944).

Born in Sliven, he finished primary school in Stara Zagora and secondary school in Sofia, after which he enrolled at the Military School of Sofia, but left before graduating. In 1915, he graduated with a degree in civil engineering from the Technical University of Munich.

During World War I, he headed a railroad construction project in Macedonia. In 1919, he was appointed deputy head of the water supply department of Sofia. In 1924, he started working on what turned out to be his most recognised work: the water supply line from Rila mountain to Sofia. The project had a total length of 82 km, which included 38.5 km of channels, 17.9 km of tunnels and 25.3 km of tubes. The line was completed in 1933.

In 1934, Ivanov was elected mayor of Sofia. He focused his efforts on eliminating the corruption and bureaucracy in City Hall. He published monthly the expenses of the city. In 1938, the first urban plan for Sofia was created. During his term, all the streets of Sofia were paved and bus and trolley bus mass transit was introduced. He also started large-scale tree planting on the streets of the capital. By the end of his term, Ivanov was planning the construction of Beli Iskar Dam, which was intended to feed the Sofia water supply line.

After the Bulgarian coup d'état of 1944, Ivanov was imprisoned and sentenced to life for political reasons. Nevertheless, his abilities as a hydro-engineer were recognised by the communist rulers and he was allowed to continue working on the Beli Iskar Dam. Initially, he worked from his prison cell before he was freed.

He died in 1965.

Preceded by Dr. Haralampi Oroshakov	Mayor of Sofia; 1934-1944	Succeeded by Petar Slavinski
