= Vidim (Mělník District) =

- Municipality
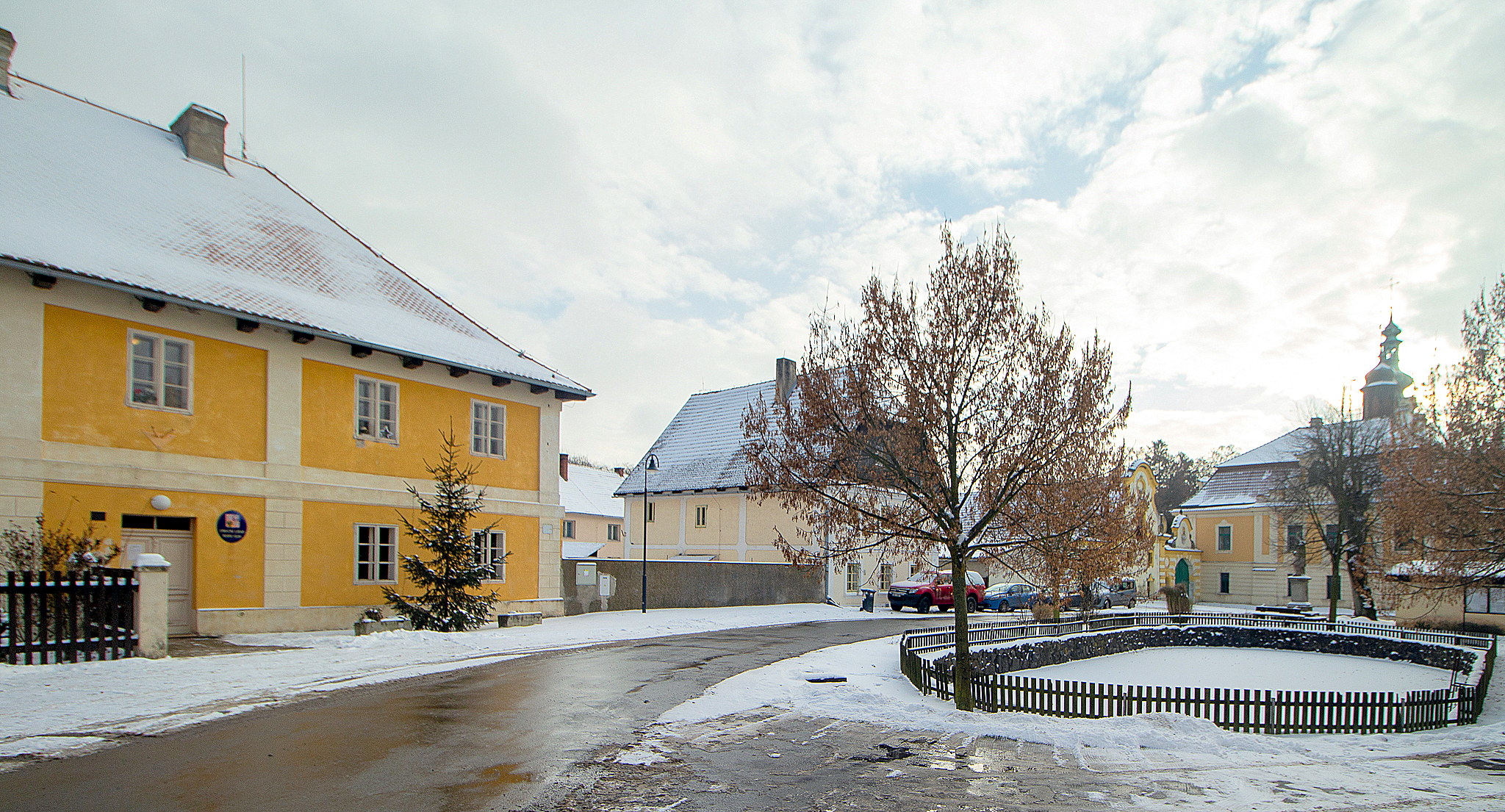
- Centre of Vidim

- Location in the Czech Republic
- Coordinates: 50°28′5″N 14°31′33″E
- Country: Czech Republic
- Region: Central Bohemian
- District: Mělník
- First mentioned: 1318

Area
  - Total: 8.74 km^{2} (3.37 sq mi)
- Elevation: 313 m (1,027 ft)

Population (2026-01-01)
  - Total: 129
  - Density: 14.8/km^{2} (38.2/sq mi)
- Time zone: UTC+1 (CET)
  - Summer (DST): UTC+2 (CEST)
- Postal code: 277 21
- Website: www.obec-vidim.cz

Vidim is a municipality and village in Mělník District in the Central Bohemian Region of the Czech Republic. It has about 100 inhabitants. The village is well preserved and is protected as a village monument zone.

== Etymology ==
The name is derived from the personal name Vidim, meaning "Vidim's (court, mill)".

== Geography ==
Vidim is located about 13 kilometres (8 mi) north of Mělník and 39 km (24 mi) north of Prague. It lies in a hilly landscape of the Ralsko Uplands. The highest point is below the top of the hill Supí hora at 430 m (1,410 ft) above sea level. The entire municipal territory lies in the Kokořínsko – Máchův kraj Protected Landscape Area.

== History ==
The first written mention of Vidim is from 1318. In the 14th century, it belonged to the Houska estate owned by the Berka of Dubá family. In the 15th century, Vidim was owned by less important members of the families Lobkowicz and Smiřický. In 1502, the village was purchased by Hrzáns of Hrzánov. Visim became the centre of a separate estate in 1572. From that year, the importance of the village grew.

Berkas of Dubá acquired Vidim again in 1610, but their properties were confiscated after the Battle of White Mountain. During the Thirty Years' War, the village was partially destroyed. German settlers were invited after the war to repopulate the village. In 1623–1634, the Vidim estate was owned by Albrecht von Wallenstein, then it was owned by general Johann Böck and his descendants, by the Sporck family (1743–1807) and Ahrenberg family.

== Demographics ==
Historical population

Year	Pop.	±%
1869	629	—
1880	592	−5.9%
1890	510	−13.9%
1900	510	+0.0%
1910	471	−7.6%

Year	Pop.	±%
1921	456	−3.2%
1930	423	−7.2%
1950	163	−61.5%
1961	290	+77.9%
1970	258	−11.0%

Year	Pop.	±%
1980	246	−4.7%
1991	167	−32.1%
2001	196	+17.4%
2011	201	+2.6%
2021	164	−18.4%

Source: Censuses

== Transport ==
There are no railways or major roads passing through the municipality.

== Sights ==
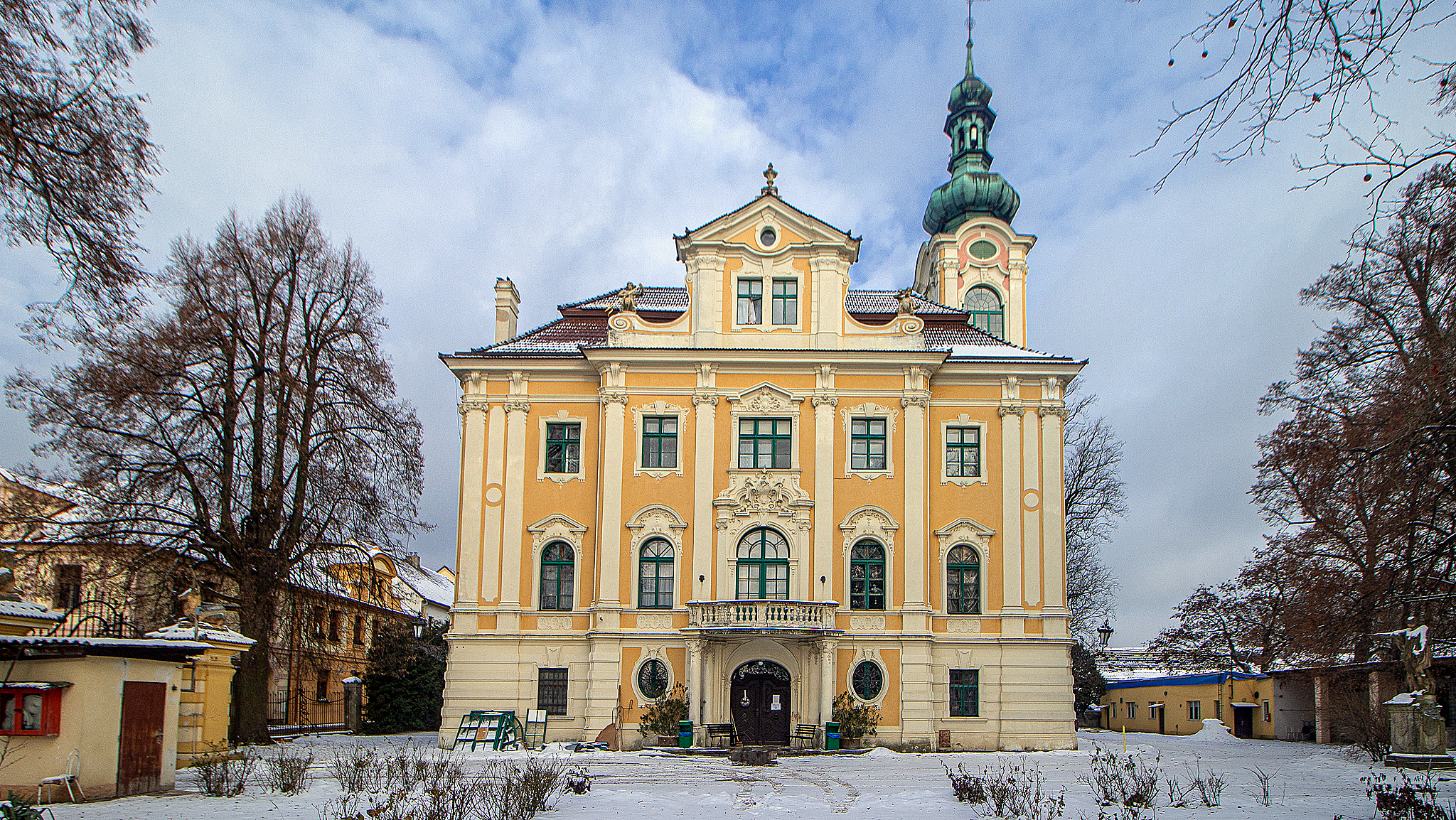
Vidim Castle

The entire area of the village of Vidim was declared a village monument zones for its well-preserved examples of vernacular architecture, typical for this region. The main landmark is the Church of Saint Martin. It was built in the neo-Gothic style in 1878. It replaced an older Gothic-Baroque church with a separate bell tower, which was first documented in 1352. In front of the church is a pair of baroque statues of saints Augustine Anne from around 1740.

The Vidim Castle replaced an old fortress from the 14th century. After 1635, the fortress was rebuilt into a Baroque castle. The reconstruction was finished in the 18th century. At the end of the 19th century, the castle was completely rebuilt in the neo-Baroque style. Since 1952, a home for the elderly has been located here.

== Notable people ==
- Ivan Mrkvička (1856–1938), painter
