= Coat of arms of Sofia =

Heraldic emblem of the city

- Armiger: Government of the city of Sofia
- Adopted: 1928
- Crest: A three-tower mural crown
- Supporters: None
- Motto: (1911–1974; 1991–); Расте, но не старѣе (Bulgarian with pre-1945 orthography) (1974–1991); Расте, но не старее (Bulgarian) "Ever Growing, Never Aging"

The coat of arms of Sofia consists of a shield divided into four. The image of the Saint Sofia Church which gave the name to the city takes up the upper right quarter (as seen from behind the shield) and a humanized picture of the ancient town of Serdica taken from an antique coin is located to the left. At the lower left is a golden baldachin and a statue of Apollo Medicus representing the mineral springs around the city, while the lower right quarter is reserved for Vitosha, the mountain at the foot of which Sofia is located.

In the middle is another, smaller shield (inescutcheon), with a lion rampant, a traditional Bulgarian symbol. A mural crown tops the larger shield. At the bottom is the city motto, "Расте, но не старѣе" – Raste, no ne staree ("Ever Growing, Never Aging").

== History ==
The coat of arms was created for the Paris Exposition Universelle in 1900 by a team of three noted Bulgarian artists and specialists – Haralampi Tachev, Ivan Mrkvička and Václav Dobruský, as the city was required by the executive committee to submit a symbol in order to take part. The then-Knyaz Ferdinand approved the coat of arms and it was sent to Paris.

Changes were made to the original image of the coat of arms in the following years. The motto was first added in 1911 by Haralampi Tachev, who also gave it a final touch by adding a band with the motto and laurel twigs in 1928. A simplified version was suggested by Boris Angelushev in the 1940s, with Ivan Radoev adding a five-pointed star and additionally stylizing the coat of arms in 1974 during the communist era.

Following the fall of communism, Haralampi Tachev's original 1928 version returned to official use. The coat of arms was restored during the term of Sofia's first democratically elected mayor, Alexander Yanchulev, who served from 1991 to 1995. Mayor Yanchulev also restored the city's pre-communist flag.

== Gallery ==
1900–1911

1911–1928

1928–1974

1974–1991

1991
