= Vidim, Russia =

Vidim Видим
- Urban-type settlement
- Interactive map of Vidim
- Location of Vidim Vidim (Irkutsk Oblast)
- Coordinates: 56.4092°N 103.1103°E
- Country: Russia
- Federal subject: Irkutsk Oblast
- Administrative district: Nizhneilimsky District

Population (2010 Census)
  - Total: 1,236
  - Estimate (2025): 869 (−29.7%)
- Time zone: UTC+8 (MSK+5)
- Postal code: 665660
- OKTMO ID: 25626155051

Vidim (Russian: Видим) is an urban locality (an urban-type settlement) in Nizhneilimsky District of Irkutsk Oblast, Russia. Population: 1,236 (2010 census); 1,453 (2002 census); 2,226 (1989 Soviet census).
