= University of Library Studies and Information Technologies =

Coordinates: 42.6576°N 23.3878°E

- Университет по библиотекознание и информационни технологии
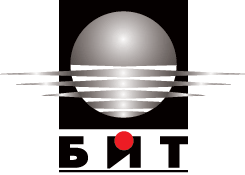
- Type: State-owned
- Established: 1950
- Rector: Irena Peteva
- Students: c. 2500
- Location: Sofia, Bulgaria
- Website: www.unibit.bg

The University of Library Studies and Information Technologies is a Bulgarian university. It is the successor consequently of the Specialised Higher School of Library Studies and Information Technologies (est. 2 Sept 2004), the College of Library Studies and Information Technologies (CLSIT), the College of Library Studies (CLS), the Institute of Library Studies (ILS) and the State Institute of Library Studies (est. 1950). The current school was established by a resolution of the National Assembly of Bulgaria on 29 September 2010.

SULSIT is member of the Balkan Universities Network.

== Structure ==
As of 2012, the structure of SULSIT is as follows:

- The Faculty of Library Studies and Cultural Heritage
  - Library Sciences Dept.
  - Library Management Dept.
  - Book and Society Dept.
  - Cultural and Historical Heritage Dept.
- The Faculty of Information Sciences
  - Information Systems and Technologies Dept.
  - Communications and Security Dept.
  - Computer Sciences Dept.
- Department of Comprehensive Studies
  - Foreign Language Preparation Centre
- Institutes, Research Centres and Labs
  - Institute for Scientific Research and Doctoral Programs (PhD School)
  - Research Institute in Organisation, Management and Protection of Cultural and Historical Heritage
  - Centre for Continuing Education
  - Centre for Distance Education
  - Centre for Information Security and Protection
  - Centre for Career Orientation and Student Development
  - Scientific and Research Laboratory for Cybernetic Security
  - John Atanasoff Computer Lab
  - Oracle Lab
- Publishing House „Za Bukvite – O Pismeneh”
- Facilities:
  - Microsoft Developers Network Academic Alliance
  - Library and Information Centre (with a reading-room for 150 people)
  - Education and demonstration museum collection „Spirit and Leadership”
  - Chapel of St Nicholas the Miracle-Maker
  - Sports Complex (indoor and outdoor facilities for tennis, mini-football, gym)

== Programmes ==
The curricula for the Bachelor and master's degrees are in line with the requirements of the Higher Education Act and the European Credit Transfer System (ECTS).

As of academic year 2014/2015, SULSIT offers the following Bachelor Programs:

- Faculty of Library Studies and Cultural Heritage:
  - Library Studies and Bibliography (LSB)
  - Library and Information Management (LIM)
  - Press Communications (PC)
  - Archives and Document Studies (ADS)
  - Information Funds of the Cultural and Historical Heritage (IFCHH)
  - Information Resources of Tourism (IRT)
  - Communications and Informing (CI)
  - Public policies and practices (PPP)
- Faculty of Information Sciences:
  - Information Technologies (IT)
  - Information Brokering (IB)
  - Information Security (IS)
  - Computer Sciences (CS)
  - Information Technologies in Law Administration (ITLA)
  - National Security and Cultural and Historical Heritage (NSCHH)
  - National Security (NS)

SULSIT trains students in the following M.A Degree Programs:

- Faculty of Library Studies and Cultural Heritage:
  - Library-Informing and Cultural Management
  - Publishing Business and Electronic Resources
  - Media Information and Advertising
  - Cultural and Historical Heritage in the Modern Information Environment
  - Protection of Cultural and Historical Heritage in the Republic of Bulgaria
  - Culture Tourism
  - Electronic content: innovations and politics
  - Management of documents and archives
  - Museum and Art Management
  - Applied Bulgaristics
  - Science and Technology Research
  - Business and Administration Informations Technologies and Communications
  - Strategic Communications and Informing
- Faculty of Information Sciences:
  - Information Technologies
  - IT in the Media Industry (in co-operation with the Moscow State University of Printing Arts)
  - Technical Entrepreneurship and Information Technologies Innovation
  - Electronic Business and Elevtronic Management
  - Software Engineering
  - Information Technologies and Finance Engineering
  - National security: State, Spirituality and Leadership
  - National Security
  - Information Security

== See also ==
- List of universities in Bulgaria
