= Aleksandar Karakachanov =

Bulgarian politician (born 1960)

- Born: September 11, 1960 (age 66); Sofia, Bulgaria
- Education: Sofia University
- Occupations: Politician; Founder and Chairman of the Green Party of Bulgaria; Mayor of Sofia (1990-1991); Professor at SULSIT
- Years active: 1989-present

Aleksandar Panayotov Karakachanov (Bulgarian: Александър Панайотов Каракачанов; born September 11, 1960) is a Bulgarian politician, social activist, dissident and university professor.

== Biography ==
Karakachanov was born in Sofia on September 11, 1960, in the family of Gen. Panayot Karakachanov. He completed his secondary education in Moscow, then USSR, and went on to read philosophy at Sofia University. In 1989 he obtained a PhD within the Programme for Research of the Human Brain (the title of his thesis is "An integrated approach to man as a bio-psycho-social creature : dialectics of the biological, psychological and social") and became an assistant lecturer. In 1993 graduated in Economics from UNWE. Currently, Karakachanov teaches in Sofia University and SULSIT. He is the author of "Man and Consciousness". He is married and has a child.

== Political activity ==
Before the regime change of 1989, Karakachanov was a City Councillor in Sofia. He became a founding member of the Club in Support of Glasnost and Perestroika and a founder and chairman of the Green Party of Bulgaria, two of the dissident civil organisations which were active before Nov 10, 1989. A third, Ecoglasnost, was founded in Karakachanov's apartment on Apr 11, 1989.

After the 1989 changes, Karakachanov and the Green Party became a founding member of the Union of Democratic Forces, Bulgaria's opposition organisation. Participated in the Round table negotiations between the ruling Communist party and the opposition, whose goal was to prepare the country for the first post-Communist elections. Karakachanov was elected to the Seventh Great National Assembly (July 10, 1990 – Oct 2, 1991), which forged the current Constitution of Bulgaria, and to the Thirty-Eighth National Assembly (May 7, 1997 – Apr 19, 2001).

Karakachanov served as Caretaker Mayor of Sofia (first mayor of the UDF) from Oct 17, 1990, to Oct 20, 1991.
