= Provisional Russian Administration in Bulgaria =

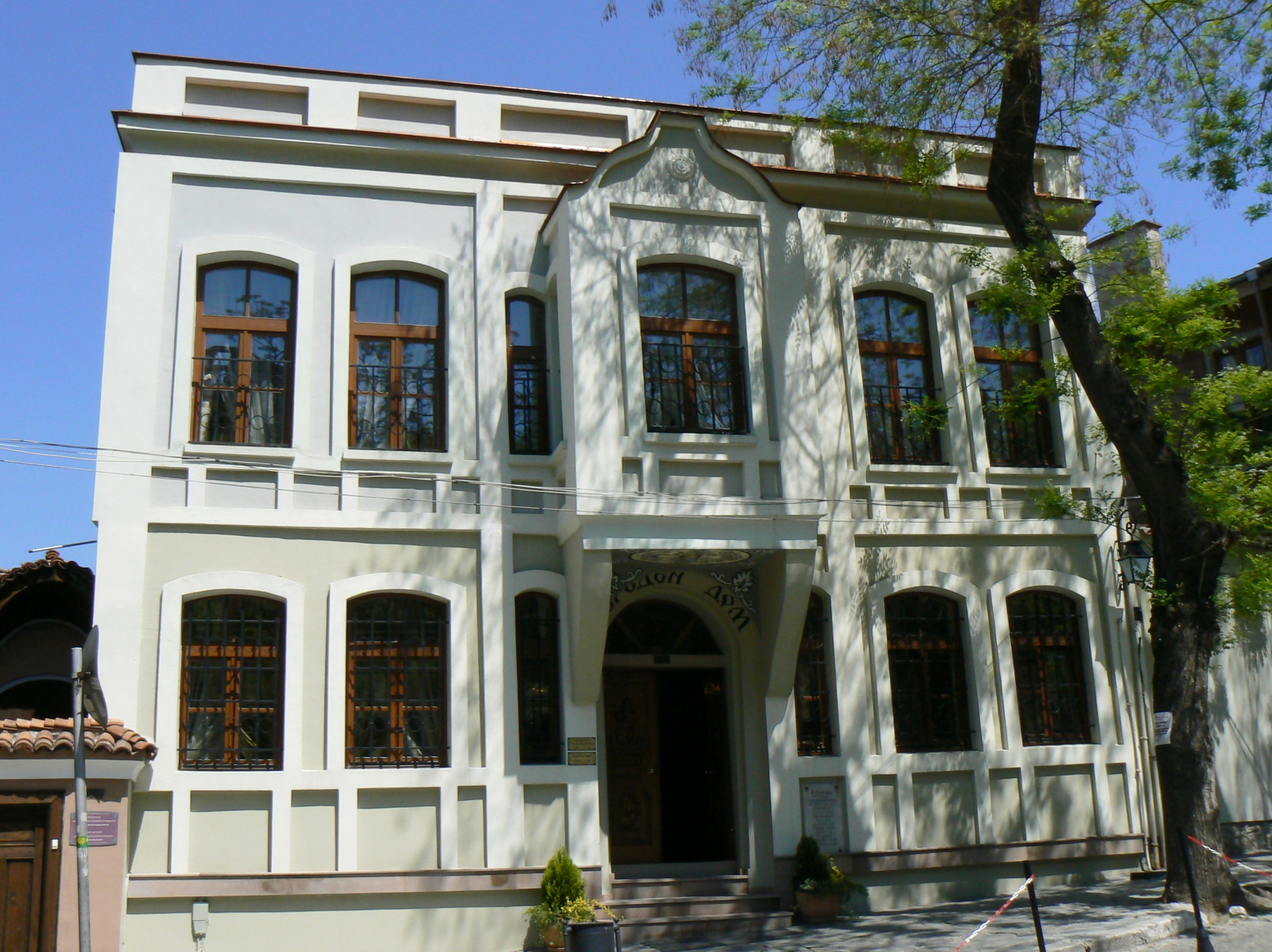
The building in Plovdiv, where the Temporary Russian Governance was located since May till October 1878

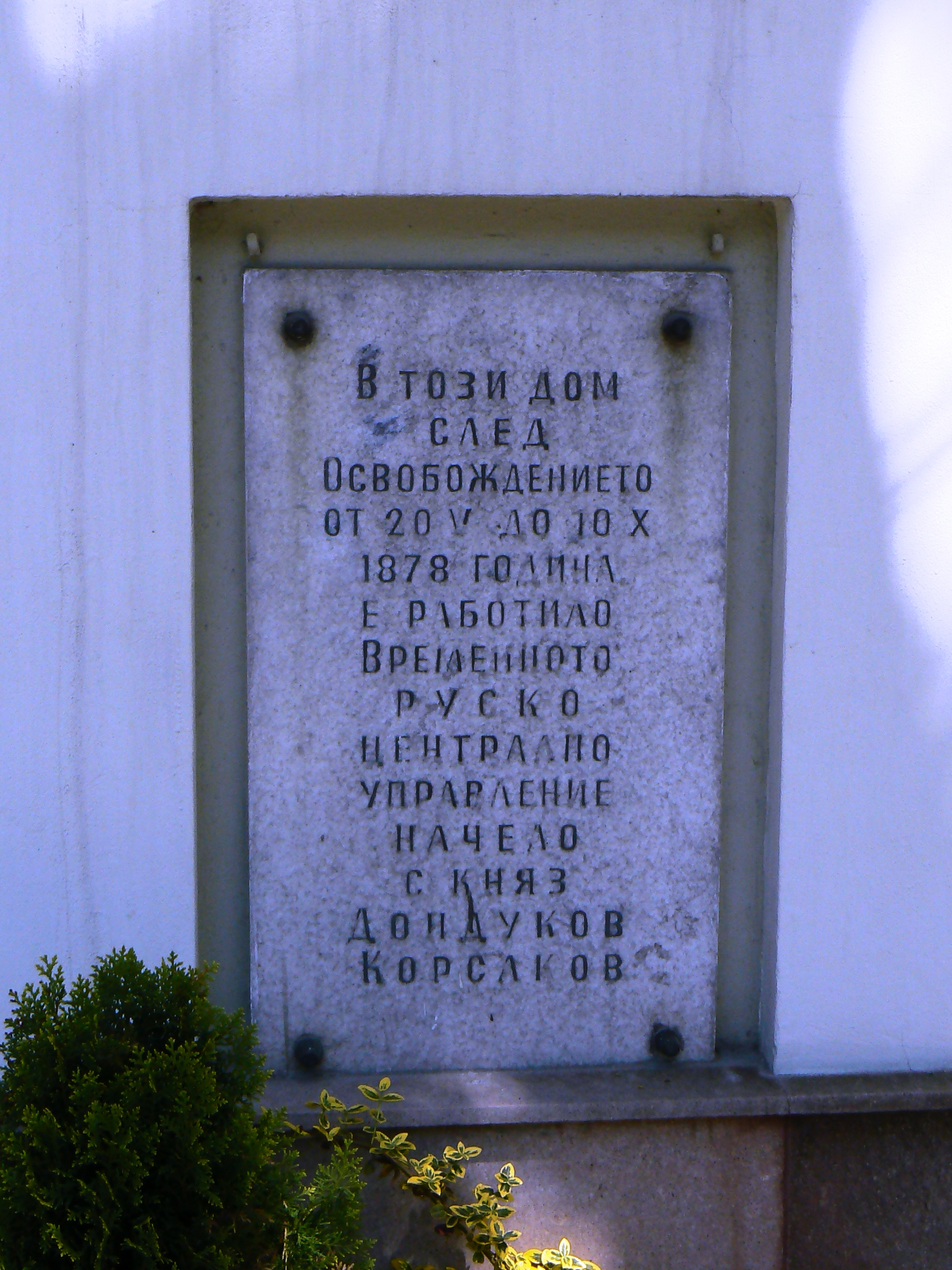
The memorial tablet

The Provisional Russian Administration in Bulgaria (Russian: Временное русское управление в Болгарии, Bulgarian: Временно руско управление в България) was an interim government established for Bulgarian territories occupied by the Imperial Russian Army during the Russo-Turkish War of 1877–1878. This administration was established in the beginning of the war in April 1877. The Treaty of Berlin (1878) provided for the termination of the Temporary Russian Governance activity since the establishment of the Principality of Bulgaria and Eastern Rumelia, in connection with which it was abolished in May 1879. The main objectives of the Temporary Russian administration was to establish peaceful life and preparation for a revival of the Bulgarian state.

The Western parts of nowadays Bulgaria which had been invaded by the Serbian Army were under Provisional Serbian Administration from 19 December 1877 to 5 June 1879.

== The organization and activities ==
The Temporary Russian Governance initially was headed by Russian emperor's commissioner prince Vladimir Cherkassky, as chief of the "First office of civil governance of liberated Trans-Danubian lands." After his death in March 1878 this post had been held by prince Alexander Dondukov-Korsakov. From 20 May to 10 October 1878, the Commissioner's residence located in Plovdiv, and then was moved to Sofia.

The guidance of the Civil Administration presided by the chancellery of Russian emperor's commissioner jointly with established in 1878 the Board of government over areas. Besides Russian officers and officials, many Bulgarians were included there, among of which were Dragan Tsankov, Petko Karavelov, Stefan Stambolov, Dimitar Grekov, Dimitar Petkov, Todor Ikonomov, Konstantin Stoilov. The Russian administration tried to prepare as many staff as possible to create a state mechanism for future Bulgarian states. So, initially seven provinces were headed by Russians and only one - by Bulgarian, but in six provinces the vice-governors were Bulgarians. At the local level Russians created a government system: in the districts (uezds) there were formed elective administrative councils and judicial committees, in the villages - councils of elders. There were drafted the Constitution project. The administration made preparations for the elections to the Constituent Assembly.

In the spring and summer of 1878 Bulgarian militia (opalchentsi) was transformed into regular military units and formed the Bulgarian Territorial Troops.

Many young Bulgarians were sent to the Russian military schools, and the most capable ones - also in military academies. After a short time in Bulgaria, the Russians established a local military school. To speed up the formation and training of a new army, the administration had decided to detach Russian officers and instructors from the lower ranks from the Danubian army to the Bulgarian units. Also, the Russian army encouraged the military training of the rural population in Russian units and Bulgarian voluntary detachments (which were called druzhinas) by all ranks. Such measures formed a mobilization reserve for the Bulgarian army. The Russian army had also delivered a significant amount of equipment and supplies to the Bulgarians. Russia actively contributed to the establishment of the Navy in Bulgaria.

To train officers, capable young Bulgarians were detached both in Russian military schools and in the newly created Military school in Sofia.

== The occupation debt ==
Costs incurred by the Russian exchequer for maintenance of the Temporary Russian Governance had to be reimbursed by the future Principality of Bulgaria and Eastern Rumelia. The sum accrued this way was called the "occupation debt". Bulgarians paid it irregularly, and its final settlement has taken almost half a century.

The Principality of Bulgaria serviced the debt from 1883 until 1885, when relations between Bulgaria and Russia were severed after Bulgarian unification with Eastern Rumelia, which had not been approved by Russia, and the following Serbo-Bulgarian War, prior to which Russia had withdrawn its military officers, leaving all their equipment, weapons as well as 15,000 horses to the Bulgarians, who had until that moment trained and commanded all larger units of Bulgaria's young army.

In 1890, it had sent a service payment, but regular payments were resumed only in 1896. Finally the, nearly all (around 26 million out of 28 million) that was due to be paid for the"occupation debt" was paid off by the Principality of Bulgaria in 1902 at the expense of a large foreign loan issued by a bank Paribas.

The occupation debt of Eastern Rumelia passed to the Principality of Bulgaria after the unification of Bulgaria in 1885. Its repayment was postponed many times until 1912, when Bulgaria and Russia agreed on a plan to repay the debt. The plan was never realized because after the beginning of the First World War the two countries were adversaries. After the war, the debt was written off by agreement between the Cabinet of Aleksandar Stamboliyski and the Bolshevik government of the Soviet Union.

== Bibliography ==
- Овсяный, Николай Романович|Овсяный, Н. Русское управление в Болгарии в 1877-78-79 гг. Т. I. Заведывавший гражданскими делами при Главнокомандовавшем Действующей армии д.с.с. князь В. А. Черкасский. СПб, 1906
- Овсяный, Н. Русское управление в Болгарии в 1877-78-79 гг. Т. II. Российский Императорский Комиссар в Болгарии, генерал-адъютант князь А. М. Дондуков - Корсаков. СПб, 1906
- Овсяный, Н. Русское управление в Болгарии в 1877-78-79 гг. Т. II. Восточная Румелия и Адрианопольский санджак. СПб, 1907

== See also ==
- Eastern Rumelia
- Military of Bulgaria
- Principality of Bulgaria
- History of Bulgaria
- Russo-Turkish War of 1877–1878
