= Green Party (Bulgaria) =

Bulgarian political party

Green Party Зелена партия
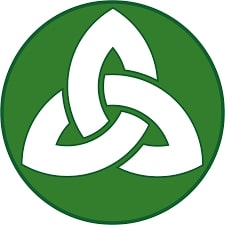
- Leader: Atanas Schmidt
- Spokesperson: Aleksandar Karakachanov
- Founded: 28 December 1989
- Headquarters: Sofia, Bulgaria
- Ideology: Green politics
- Political position: Centre-left
- Colors: Green
- National Assembly: 0 / 240
- European Parliament: 0 / 17

Website
- greenparty-bg.eu

The Green Party (Bulgarian: Зелена партия, romanized: Zelena partiya) is an environmentalist political party in Bulgaria. It was founded in Sofia in 1989 by Aleksandar Karakachanov, who later went on to become the chairperson of the party.

== History ==
The Green Party was established on December 28, 1989 by Alexander Karakachanov. It consisted of activists from the "Ecoglasnost" movement. Right after its formation, the party joined the Union of the Democratic Forces in Bulgaria (UDF), which was then a broad coalition of anti-totalitarian political parties and organizations.

The party had 17 representatives in the 7th Grand National Assembly, where it was the initiator and submitter of the proposal for the Bulgaria's accession to the European Union. It was most recently represented by two MPs in the 38th National Assembly.

=== Merging ===
A small party called Green Bulgaria merged with the Green Party in 2008 to form The Green Party – Bulgarian Greens. The new party was chaired by Stoyan Dinkov on the Political Council (2008–2009). Alexander Karakachanov became president after the merger. Trifon Grudev, formerly of Green Bulgaria, became the vice-president.

== Participation in elections ==
The party usually seeks to form a coalition with left-wing and center-left actors.

In 1989, it was a founding member of the UDF, a broad anti-totalitarian coalition. In elections for the 7th Grand National Assembly, Green Party won 17 MPs. In the 1991 National Assembly election, the party won 2.81% of the vote and no MPs.

The party joined the Democratic Alternative for the Republic coalition in the 1994 election, winning 3.84% of the vote. In the 1997 election, as part of the Union for National Salvation coalition, two Green Party MPs were elected.

In 2005, the Green Party participated in the elections for the National Assembly as a member of the Coalition for Bulgaria known as the Triple Coalition. The Green Party had no elected representatives, and it left the coalition before the end of the term as a result of policy disagreements. Specifically, the party disagreed with the shift towards neoliberal politics and swaps of state forests made by the ruling Coalition. The Green Party protested against these actions of the ruling government and submitted a law for restoring the swapped forests and lands.

During the 2007 European Parliament elections, conservationist Thomas Belev was nominated as a candidate from the civil quota in 2007. The party received 9,976 votes forming 0.51% of the vote.

The party did not participate in national or European Parliament elections in 2009 and 2013. However, they participated in the 2014 elections, winning around 9,000 votes or 0.4% of the popular vote.

The party generally achieves a higher vote share than the other Bulgarian green parties. Its best ever result was in the municipality of Blagoevgrad where it won 8.4% of the vote and has 6 MPs in the local parliament.

== Participation in power ==
The Green Party was part of the UDF during the administration of Philip Dimitrov in 1991–1992. During this time, Alexander Karakachanov was supported by the UDF and elected as the mayor of Sofia.

From 2005 to 2009, the Green Party participated in the ruling Coalition for Bulgaria with the support of two other parliamentary parties, the Movement for Rights and Freedoms (MRF) and National Movement for Stability and Progress (NMSS). Under coalition government, there would be one Green Party deputy minister. Dimitar Bongalov, the vice-chairman of the Green Party, was appointed Deputy Minister of Justice in charge of prisons, execution of punishments, and supervising the Chief Directorate on Execution of Punishments at the Ministry of Justice. In 2007, Bongalov lost the support of the party and resigned as deputy chairman, and later as deputy minister. He was replaced by Ilonka Ivancheva-Raychinova from the Green Party. The Green Party left the Coalition before the end of the Stanishev government over policy disagreements.

== See also ==
- European Green Party
- Green party
- Green politics
- List of environmental organizations
