= Timeline of Plovdiv =

The following is a timeline of the history of the city of Plovdiv, Bulgaria.

== Prior to 20th century ==
- 342 BCE – Philip II of Macedon conquered the Thracian settlement Pulpudeva and renamed it "Philippopolis."
- 2nd C. CE – Roman theatre built by Emperor Trajan.
- 250/251 CE – Battle of Philippopolis; town sacked by Goths.
- 340's – Christian church council held in Philippopolis.
- 836 – Town becomes part of the First Bulgarian Empire under Khan Malamir.
- 971 – John I Tzimiskes captures Philippopolis in his campaign against Sviatoslav I.
- 1205 –Philippopolis surrenders to Kaloyan of Bulgaria.
- 1208 – June: Battle of Philippopolis (1208).
- 1262 – Byzantines under Michael VIII retook the city.
- 1323 – Tatar forces attempted unsuccessful siege.
- 1344 – Anna of Savoy ceded the city to Ivan Alexander of Bulgaria.
- 1363 – City taken by Turkish forces under Lala Şahin Pasha.
- 1364 – Ottomans in power; town renamed "Filibe".
- 1420's – Great Mosque built.
- 1440's – Imaret Mosque built.
- 1818 – Earthquake.
- 1832 – Sts. Constantine and Helena Church rebuilt.
- 1835 – St. Nicholas church, Plovdiv rebuilt.
- 1836 – St. Petka Church school established.
- 1844 – Church of the Holy Mother of God, Plovdiv rebuilt.
- 1846 – Fire.
- 1847 – Textile factory in operation.
- 1856 – St. Marina church rebuilt.
- 1861 – Cathedral of St Louis built.
- 1870 - Plovdiv Central railway station opened.
- 1875 – Greek Zariphios School established.
- 1878
  - Battle of Philippopolis (1878).
  - City becomes capital of Eastern Roumelia per the Congress of Berlin.
  - Danov publisher in business.
  - Tomasian tobacco manufacturer in business (approximate date).
- 1879 – Naroden Glas newspaper in publication.^{(bg)}
- 1881 – International Theatre Luxembourg opens.
- 1882 – Plovdiv Regional Archaeological Museum opens.
- 1885
  - "Bloodless revolution at Philippopolis."
  - Еко де Балкан (1885) newspaper published.
- 1886 – November: "State of siege at Philippopolis on account of brigandage and Russian agency."
- 1891 – City master plan approved.
- 1892
  - August: "First Bulgarian exhibition" opens.
  - Exhibition Park laid out.
  - Plovdiv Synagogue built.
- 1893
  - "Socialist organization" founded by Dimiter Blagoev.
  - Population: 41,068.

== 20th century ==
- 1906
  - Anti-Greek unrest.
  - Population: 45,572.
- 1908 – Plovdiv Central railway station built.
- 1909 – Pathé cinema opens.
- 1910 – Population: 47,981.
- 1912 – Amer Gaazi Dzami (mosque) demolished.
- 1917 – Plovdiv Regional Ethnographic Museum established.
- 1921 – FC Maritsa Plovdiv (football club) formed.
- 1926 – Todor Diev Stadium opens.
- 1928 – April: 1928 Chirpan–Plovdiv earthquakes.
- 1932 – Тодор Александров (1932) newspaper begins publication.
- 1934
  - Annual Plovdiv Fair begins.
  - Population: 99,883.
- 1938 - Plovdiv Regional Ethnographic Museum new location.
- 1940 – 1940 Bulgaria tobacco strike.
- 1945
  - Plovdiv Medical University founded.
  - Plovdiv Philharmonic Orchestra established.
- 1947 – FC Spartak Plovdiv (football club) and Detska Kitka Choir formed.
- 1950 – Plovdiv Stadium built.
- 1951 – Plovdiv Regional Historical Museum established.
- 1953
  - 1953 Plovdiv strike.
  - Opera house established.
- 1955 – Trolleybus begins operating.
- 1956 – Population: 161,836.
- 1957 – Alyosha Monument, Plovdiv erected.
- 1960 – Plovdiv Regional Museum of Natural History founded.
- 1961 – Hristo Botev Stadium (Plovdiv) opens.
- 1964
  - Academy of Music, Dance and Fine Arts (Plovdiv) established.
  - Population: 203,800.
- 1965 – Plovdiv Airport new terminal opens.
- 1972 – Plovdiv University "Paisii Hilendarski" active.
- 1981 – Expo 81 held in city.
- 1985 – Population: 342,131.
- 1987 – Administrative Plovdiv okrug (province) created.
- 1991
  - Maritsa newspaper begins publication.
  - Museum of Aviation, Plovdiv founded.
- 1993 – Population: 345,205 (estimate).
- 1999 – Ivan Chomakov becomes mayor.

== 21st century ==
- 2005 – "Night of museums" begins.
- 2007 – Slavcho Atanasov becomes mayor.
- 2011 – Ivan Totev becomes mayor.
- 2013 – Population: 341,041.
- 2014 – February: Anti-Muslim unrest.
- 2019 – European Capital of Culture

== See also ==
- History of Plovdiv
- Other names of Plovdiv e.g. Felibe, Filibe, Filippopoli, Paldin, Philippopolis, Philippoupolis, Puldin, Trimontium
- List of mayors of Plovdiv
- Timelines of other cities in Bulgaria: Sofia, Varna

== Bibliography ==
- "Philippopolis", Handbook for Travellers in Turkey (3rd ed.), London: J. Murray, 1854, OCLC 2145740
- "Filibe", Bradshaw's Hand-Book to the Turkish Empire, vol. 1: Turkey in Europe, London: W.J. Adams, c. 1872
- "Philippopel", Türkei, Rumänien, Serbien, Bulgarien [Turkey, Romania, Serbia, Bulgaria], Meyers Reisebücher (in German) (6th ed.), Leipzig: Bibliographisches Institut, 1902, hdl:2027/njp.32101064637836
- "Philippopolis", Jewish Encyclopedia, vol. 9, New York, 1907, hdl:2027/osu.32435029752862
- "Philippopolis" . Encyclopædia Britannica. Vol. 21 (11th ed.). 1910. p. 400.
- British Admiralty, Naval Intelligence Division (1920), "Gazetteer of Towns: Philippopolis", Handbook of Bulgaria, London: His Majesty's Stationery Office
- Dimiter Mihailov & Pancho Smolenov (1986). "Plovdiv". Bulgaria: a Guide. Translated by E. Yanev & R. Yossifova. Sofia: Collet's, Sofia Press – via Internet Archive. (fulltext)
- Alexander Kiossev [in Bulgarian] (2006). "Plovdiv". In Marcel Cornis-Pope; John Neubauer (eds.). History of the Literary Cultures of East-Central Europe. John Benjamins. pp. 124–144. ISBN 978-90-272-9340-4.
- Jonathan Bloom; Sheila Blair, eds. (2009). "Plovdiv". Grove Encyclopedia of Islamic Art & Architecture. Oxford University Press. ISBN 978-0-19-530991-1.
