= History of Plovdiv =

History of the Bulgarian city

The city of Plovdiv is situated in southern Bulgaria. During its long history it has been conquered by numerous peoples: Thracians, Macedon, Romans, Byzantines, Bulgarians, Ottoman Turks which contributed to the city's various historical heritage.

History of Plovdiv
Timeline of events
6000–5000 BC	Establishment of the earliest settlements on the territory of modern Plovdiv (Yasa Tepe 1 and Yasa Tepe 2)
5th century BC	Ancient Plovdiv was incorporated into the Odrysian kingdom
347–342 BC	The Thracian town was conquered by Philip II of Macedon who named it Philippopolis
46	Philippopolis was incorporated into the Roman Empire by emperor Claudius
1st–3rd century	Philippopolis became the central city of the Roman province Thracia
250	The whole city was burned down by the Goths
4th century	Philippopolis regained its previous size. The city was part of the Eastern Roman Empire
836	Khan Malamir incorporated the city into the First Bulgarian Empire
976–1014	Basil II based his army in Philippopolis during the war with Samuel of Bulgaria
1189	The city was conquered by the crusader army of Frederick Barbarossa
1205	Philippopolis was conquered and raided by the Latin Empire and Kaloyan of Bulgaria
1371	Phillipopolis was conquered by the Ottomans. The city name was changed to Filibe
January 1878	Plovdiv was liberated from Ottoman rule during the Battle of Philippopolis
July 1878	Plovdiv became capital of Eastern Rumelia
1885	Plovdiv is at the center of the events that led to the Bulgarian unification
1920–1960	Period of industrialization
1970-1980	Discovery of the archeological sights in Plovdiv, the Old town was restored
1999	Plovdiv hosted European Cultural Month
2014	Plovdiv was awarded the title European capital of culture 2019

== Antiquity ==
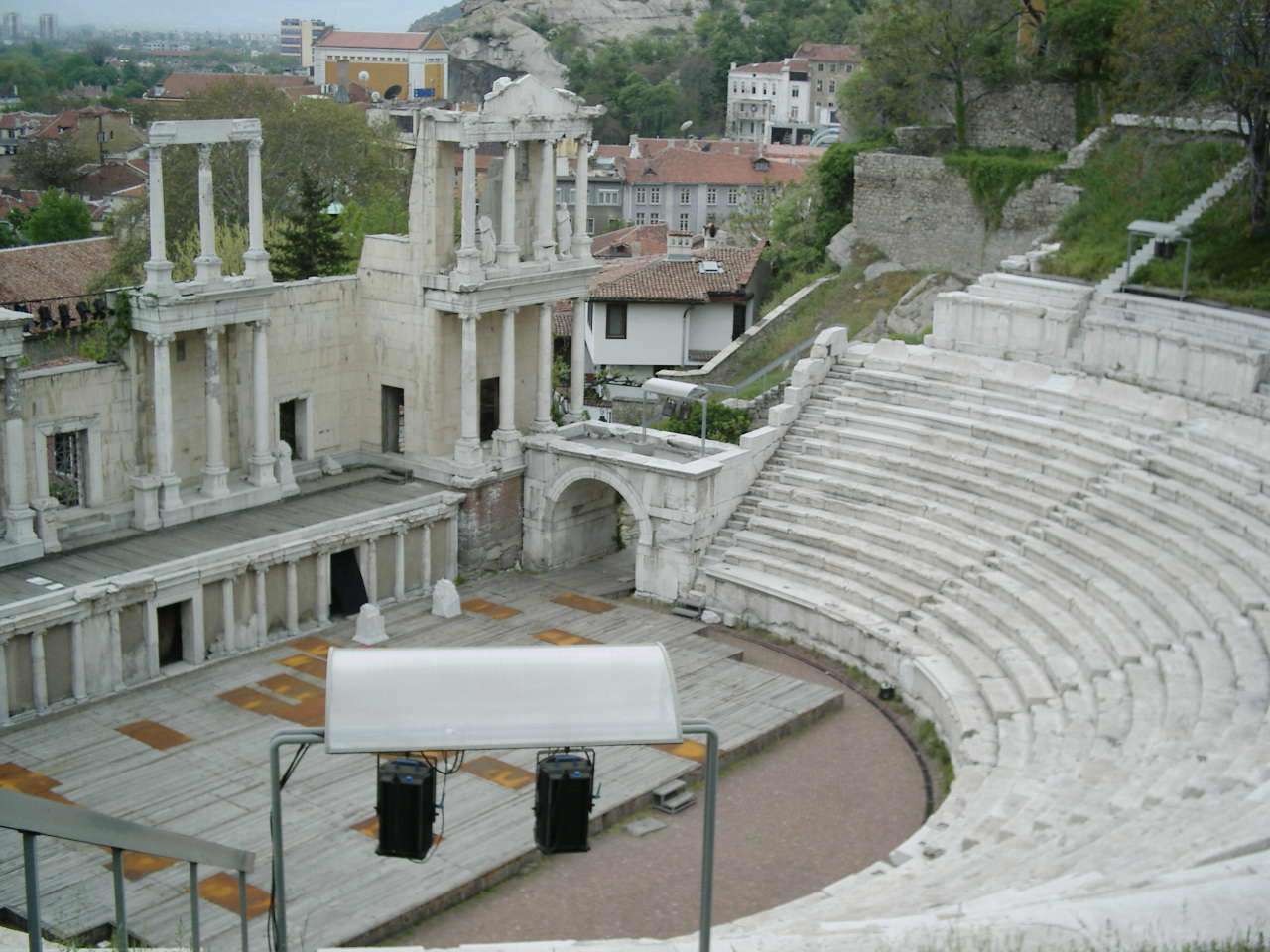
The ancient theatre of Plovidiv.

Plovdiv is one of the oldest cities in Europe. Archaeologists have discovered pottery and other objects of everyday life from as early as the Neolithic Age, showing that in the end of the 7th millennium B.C there already was an established settlement there. According to Ammianus Marcellinus, Plovdiv's post-Bronze Age history places it as a Thracian fortified settlement named Eumolpias. In 342 BC, Plovdiv was conquered by Philip II of Macedon, the father of Alexander the Great, who renamed it "Φιλιππόπολις", Philippopolis or "the city of Philip" in his own honour. Later, it was reconquered by the Thracians who called it Pulpudeva (from Philipopolis).

In 72 BC, Plovdiv was seized by the Roman general Terentius Varo Luculus. The city was incorporated into the Roman Empire, where it was called Trimontium (City of Three Hills) and served as capital of the province of Thrace. Thrimontium was an important crossroad for the Roman Empire and was called "The largest and most beautiful of all cities" by Lucian. In those times, the Via Militaris (or Via Diagonalis), the main military road in the Balkans, passed through the city.

"This [Plovdiv] is the biggest and loveliest of all towns. Its beauty shines from faraway..."

— Roman writer Lucian.

Roman times were a period of growth and culture in the city. The surviving ruins show a city with numerous public buildings, shrines, baths, and theatres, though only a small part of the ancient city has been excavated. The city had a water system and sewerage. It was defended with a double wall.

== Middle Ages ==
The Slavs had settled in the area by the middle of the 6th century, changing the ethnic proportions of the region. With the establishment of Bulgaria in 681, Philipopolis became a border fortress of the Byzantine Empire. It was captured by Khan Krum in 812, but the region was incorporated into the Bulgarian Empire in 834 during the reign of Khan Malamir. It remained in Bulgarian hands until it was conquered by the Byzantine Empire in 970 or 971. The city again came to be known as Philippopolis and became Byzantine in character. Aime de Varennes in 1180 encountered the singing of Byzantine songs in the city that recounted the deeds of Alexander the great and his predecessors, over 1,300 years before.

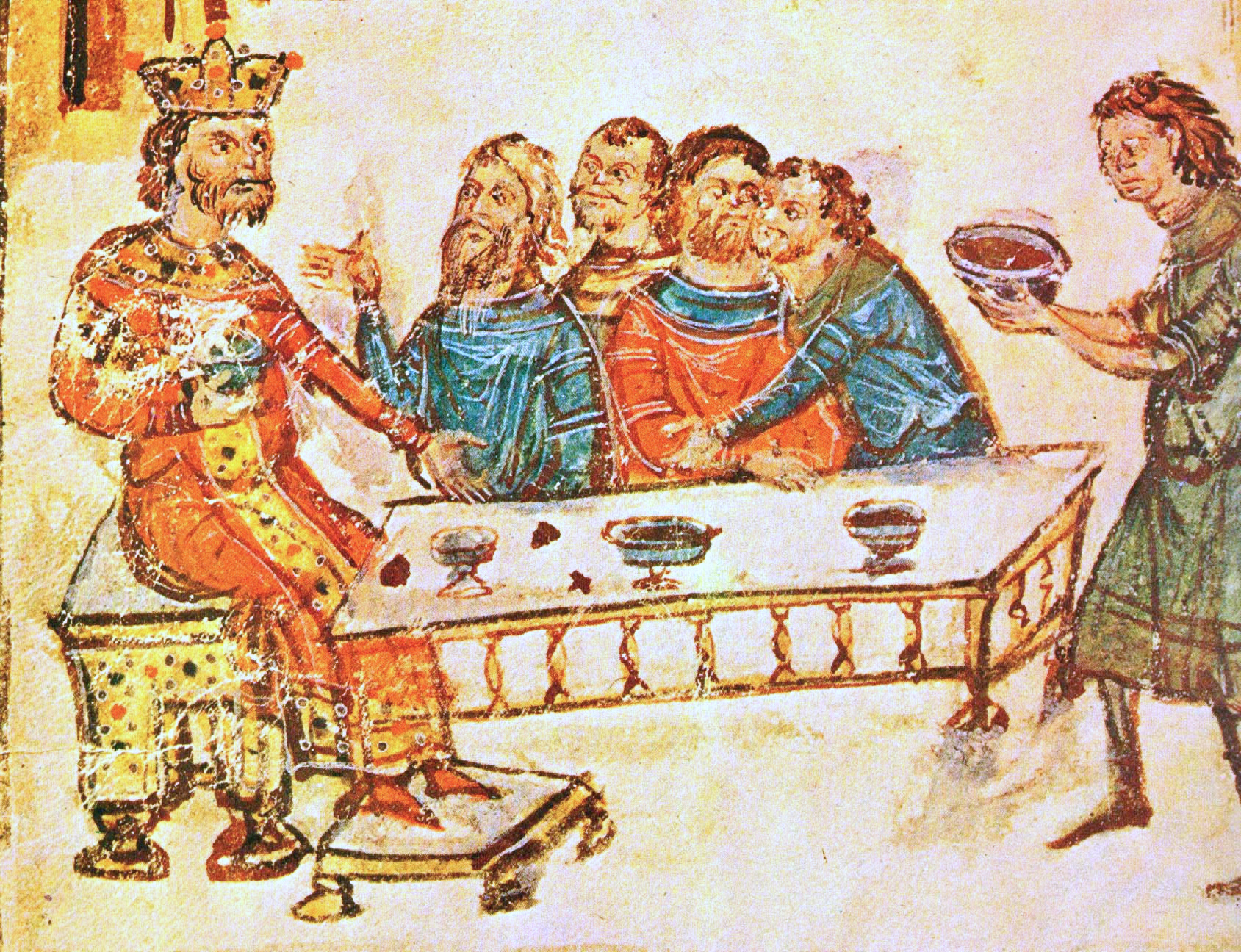
Khan Krum was the first Bulgarian ruler to capture Plovdiv.

Byzantine rule was succeeded by the Latin Empire in 1204, and there were two short interregnum periods as the city was twice occupied by Kaloyan of Bulgaria before his death in 1207. In 1208 Kaloyan's successor Boril was defeated by the Latins in the Battle of Philippopolis. Under Latin rule, Plovdiv was the capital of the Duchy of Philippopolis governed by Renier de Trit, and later on by Gerard de Strem. Bulgarian rule was reestablished during the reign of Ivan Asen II between 1225 and 1229. In 1263 Plovdiv was conquered by the restored Byzantine Empire and remained in Byzantine hands until it was re-conquered by George Terter II of Bulgaria in 1322. Byzantine rule was restored once again in 1323, but in 1344 the city was surrendered to Bulgaria by the regency for John V Palaiologos as the price for Ivan Alexander of Bulgaria's support in the Byzantine civil war.

In 1364 the Ottoman Turks under Lala Shakhin Pasha seized Plovdiv. The Turks called the city Filibe. It was the capital of Rumelia until 1382 when the Ottomans captured Sofia, which became the main city of the province. Plovdiv survived as one of the major cultural centers for Bulgarian culture and tradition. The name Plovdiv first appeared around that time and is derived from the city's Thracian name Pulpudeva (assumed to be a translation of Philippopolis, from Pulpu = Philippou and deva = city), which was rendered by the Slavs first as Pəldin (Пълдин) or Pləvdin.

== National revival ==
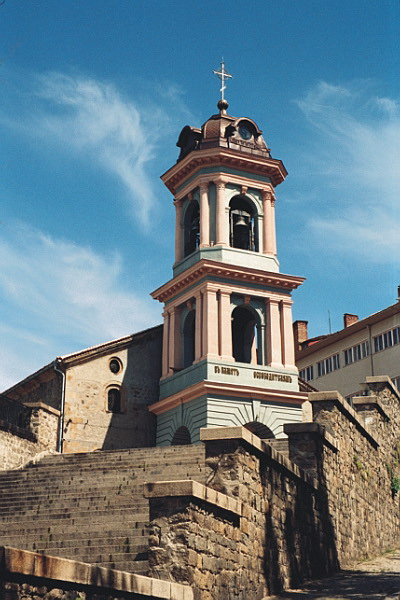
The Virgin Mary Church.

Under the rule of the Ottoman Empire, Plovdiv was a focal point for the Bulgarian national movement. During that period Plovdiv was an economic center along with Constantinople, Odrin and Thessaloniki. Due to trade, the emerging Bulgarian bourgeoisie became significant in the society. Trading with Russia and Europe these people experienced political and cultural influences. In that period the richer citizens constructed houses, many of which can still be seen in the Architectural reserve Old Plovdiv. The city was the capital of Rumelia Province between 1364 and 1864, and of Edirne province between 1864 and 1878 under Ottoman Rule.

Plovdiv played a role in the struggle for Church independence. Plovdiv became the center of that struggle with leaders such as Nayden Gerov, Dr Valkovich, and Joakim Gruev. In 1836 the first Bulgarian school was inaugurated and in 1850 modern secular education began with the St Cyril and Methodius school. On 11 May 1858 the city celebrated the saints' day of Cyril and Methodius, which later became a National holiday. In 1858 in the Church of the Virgin Mary the Christmas liturgy was spoken for the first time in the Bulgarian language. In 1868 the First Grammar School was founded.

In 1880, a total of eight Greek educational institutions were active in the city: one for boys, two for girls, three mixed schools and two teachers seminary. Among them, the High School Zariphios, established at 1875, became one of the most well known Greek educational institutions of the region. The most important Greek newspaper was Pilippoupolis (bilingual until 1882, Greek since 1886), supported by the Greek state and nationalistic organizations, was also the forum of the Greek communities of the wider region.

The city was captured from the Ottomans during the Battle of Philippopolis in 1878.

== Eastern Rumelia ==
According to the Treaty of San Stefano on 3 March 1878 the Principality of Bulgaria included the lands with predominantly Bulgarian population. Plovdiv was selected as a capital of the restored country and as a seat of the Temporary Russian Government. Great Britain and Austria-Hungary, however, did not approve that treaty and the final result of the war was concluded in the Congress of Berlin which divided the newly liberated country into several parts. It separated the autonomous region of Eastern Rumelia from Bulgaria and Plovdiv became its capital. In three-month the Ottoman Empire created an Organization Chart (Constitution) of the province and appointed a governor. At the time, it had a population of about 33,500, of which 45% were Bulgarians, 25% Greeks, 21% Turks, 6% Jews and 3% Armenians, a situation that changed rapidly in the following decades.

In the spring of 1885 Zahari Stoyanov formed the Secret Bulgarian Central Revolutionary Committee in the city which actively conducted propaganda for the unification of Bulgaria and Eastern Rumelia. On 5 September several hundred armed rebels from Golyamo Konare (now Saedinenie) marched to Plovdiv. In the night of 5–6 September these men led by Danail Nikolaev took control of the city and removed from office the General-Governor Gavril Krastevich. A provisional government was formed led by Georgi Stranski and universal mobilization was announced. After the Serbs were defeated in the Serbo-Bulgarian War, Bulgaria and Turkey reached an agreement according to which the Principality of Bulgaria and Eastern Rumelia had common government, Parliament, administration and army. Today 6 September is celebrated as the Unification Day and the Day of Plovdiv.

== Modern history ==
After Unification Plovdiv remained the second city in population and significance after the capital Sofia. The first railway in the city was built in 1874 and after 1888 it was linked with Sofia. In 1892 Plovdiv became host of the First Bulgarian Fair with international participation which was succeeded by the International Fair Plovdiv. After the liberation the first brewery was inaugurated in the city.

In the beginning of the 20th century Plovdiv grew as a significant industrial and commercial center with well-developed light and food industry. German, French and Belgian capital was invested in the city in development of modern trade, banking and industry. In 1939 there were 16,000 craftsmen and 17,000 workers in manufacturing factories, mainly for food and tobacco processing. During the Second World War the tobacco industry expanded as well as the export of fruit and vegetables. In 1943 1,500 Jews were saved from deportation in concentration camps by the archbishop of Plovdiv Cyril who later became Bulgarian Patriarch.

During the period of communist governance that followed the end of World War II many large factories were built in and nearby Plovdiv, for example a plant for non-ferrous metals, textile works, plant for electrical apparata, tobacco plant, canning factory, motor-truck factory and many others. On 6 April 1956 the first trolleybus line was opened and in the 50s the emblematic Trimontsium Hotel was constructed. In the 60s and 70s there was construction boom and many of the modern neighborhoods took shape. In the 70s and 80s many antique remains were excavated and the Old Town was fully restored. In 1990 the Sports complex "Plovdiv" was finished. It included the largest stadium and rowing canal in the country. In that period Plovdiv became the birthplace of Bulgaria's movement for democratic reform, which by 1989 had garnered enough support to enter government.

Plovdiv has hosted specialized exhibitions of the World's Fair three times, in 1981, 1985, and 1991.

== See also ==
- Other names of Plovdiv
- Timeline of Plovdiv
