= Trolleybuses in Plovdiv =

Coordinates: 42°08′05″N 24°44′28″E

Plovdiv trolleybus system
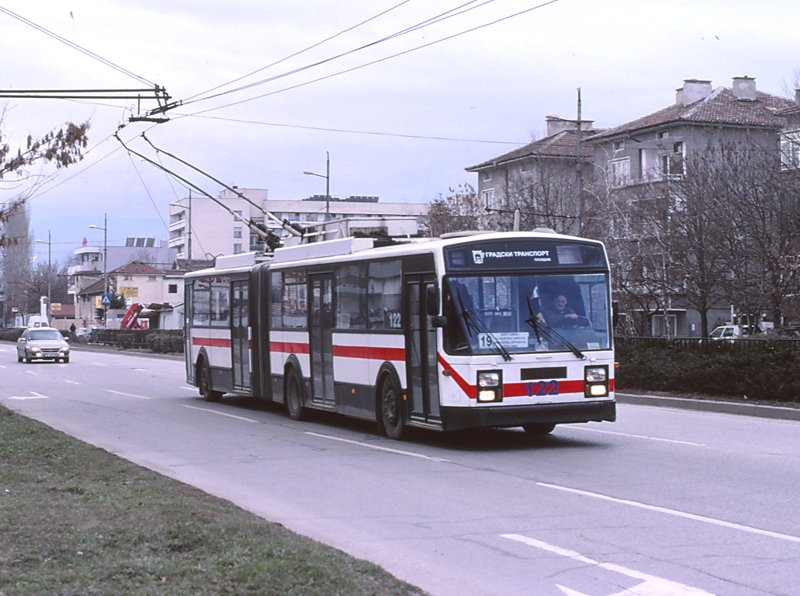
- A Van Hool trolleybus in Plovdiv.

Operation
- Locale: Plovdiv, Bulgaria
- Open: December 1955
- Close: October 2012
- Status: Defunct
- Operators: Градски Tранспорт-Пловдив АД (Gradski Transport Plovdiv)

Infrastructure
- Stock: 47 trolleybuses

Statistics
- Website: http://gradskitransport.net/ Gradski Transport (in Bulgarian)

The Plovdiv trolleybus system (Bulgarian: Пловдивски тролейбусен транспорт) was a part of the public transport network of the city and municipality of Plovdiv, the second most populous city in Bulgaria.

Opened in December 1955, the system had waxed and waned in size over time. As of the beginning of 2012, it was made up of only one route.

During the 2000s, City Transport Plovdiv (Bulgarian: Градски Транспорт Пловдив), the operator of the public transit network of the city, faced a difficult financial situation, leading to gradual reductions in its fleet size and number of lines. By 2007, the operator is privatized, under the condition that the new owner will provide 65 new trolleybuses. However, this obligation was not met, with the newly privatized operator only bringing in 23 additional vehicles, all of which were already previously used.

There are current disputes between the operator and the municipality regarding the validity of the trolleybus contract. Gradski Transport Plovdiv is still the operator of this type of transport, despite the numerous infractions of the contract since 2010.

In mid-December 2009, a shipment of 28 trolleybuses from Canada arrived at Burgas. However, it seized by Burgas customs due to unfulfilled requirements for the vehicles' clearance. As a result, by mid-2010, the confiscated vehicles had become state property, and never entered operation.

In October 2012, the city was deemed ineligible to acquire an EU grant of 65 million levs (Equivalent to about 33 million euro), citing the fact that the operator was private, instead of municipal. According to the deputy mayor of the city, the money would have been enough to renew the entire trolleybus network.

The system was officially closed, and the contract with the operator terminated on 1 October 2012. However, some trolleybuses continued operation for a few more weeks. Currently there is no trolleybus transport in the city, and the municipality has issued an order for dismantling the overhead network.

== Services ==
The sole Plovdiv trolleybus line as of 2012 was:

- 3 ТК "Марица" (TC "Maritza") – ЕАЗ (EAZ)

== Fleet ==
As of 2012, the Plovdiv trolleybus fleet had 47 trolleybuses:

- ZiU-9 - 2 units;
- Škoda 14Tr - 23 units;
- Škoda 9Tr - 1 units;
- Van Hool AG280T - 11 units (ex-Ghent trolleybus system – imported 2009);
- Saurer / Hess GT560 - 10 units (ex-St. Gallen trolleybus system – imported 2009).
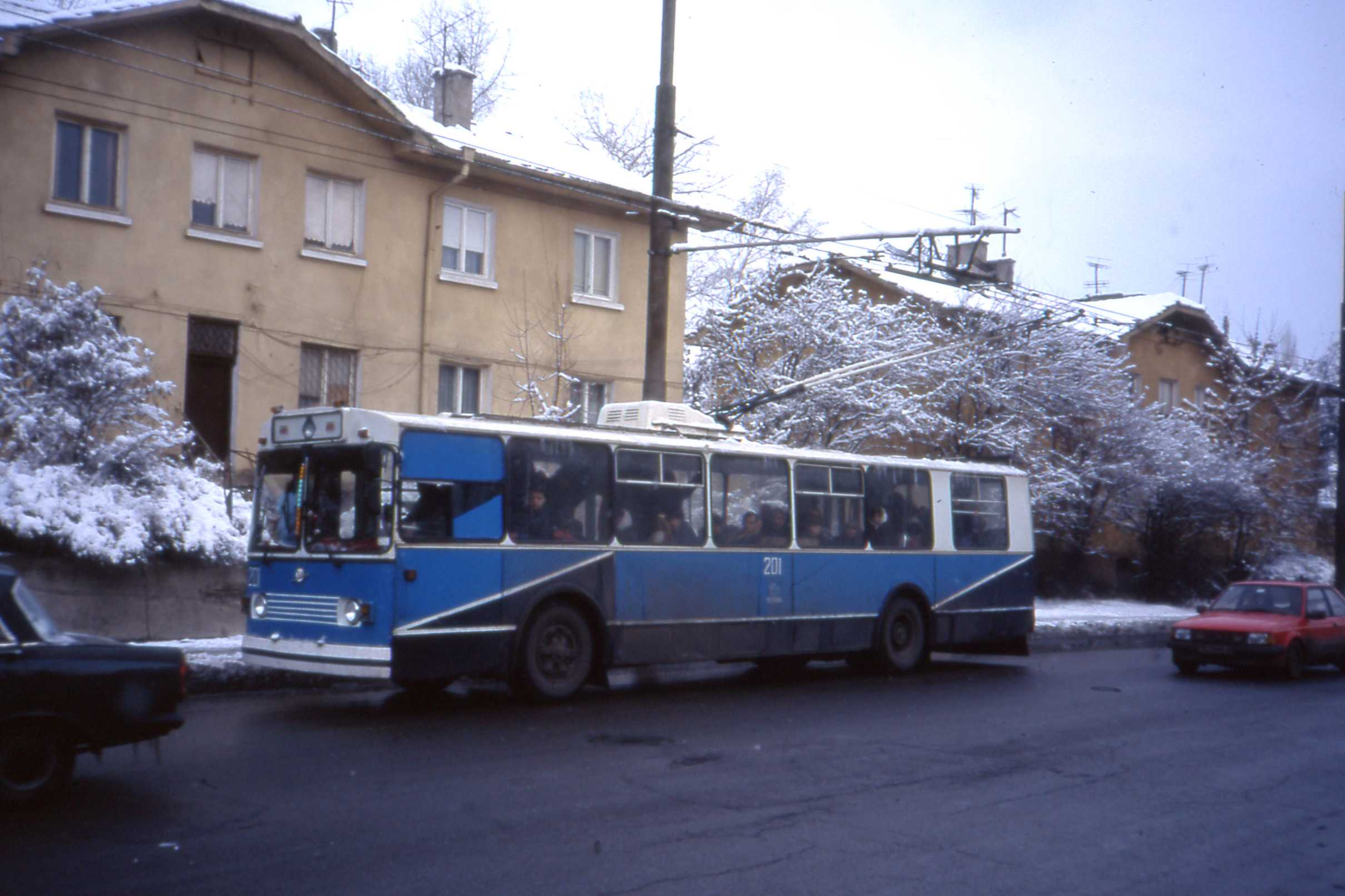
ZiU-9 trolleybus, similar to the ones used in Plovdiv

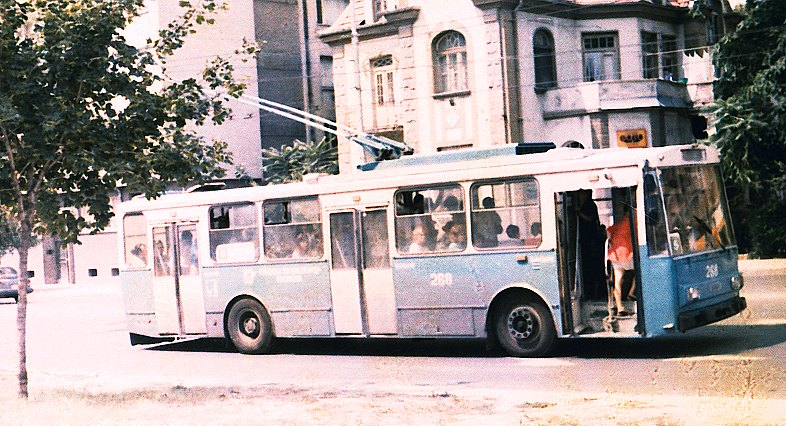
Škoda 14Tr trolleybus

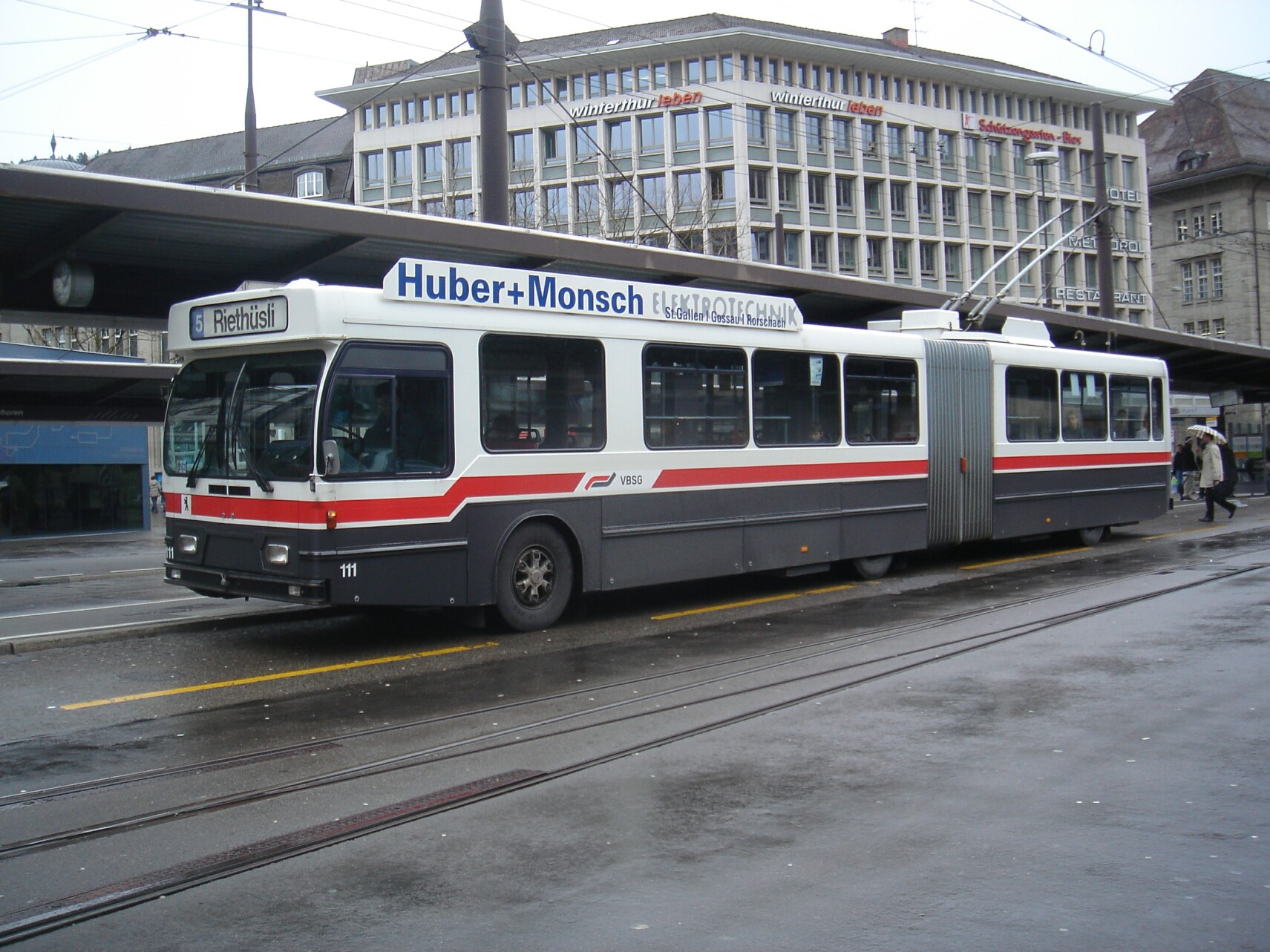
Saurer/Hess GT560 trolleybus, like the ones used in Plovdiv

== See also ==
- Plovdiv Central railway station
- List of trolleybus systems
