= Plovdiv Regional Ethnographic Museum =

Ethnographic Museum in Plovdiv
- Регионален етнографски музей — Пловдив; Regionalen etnografski muzey — Plovdiv
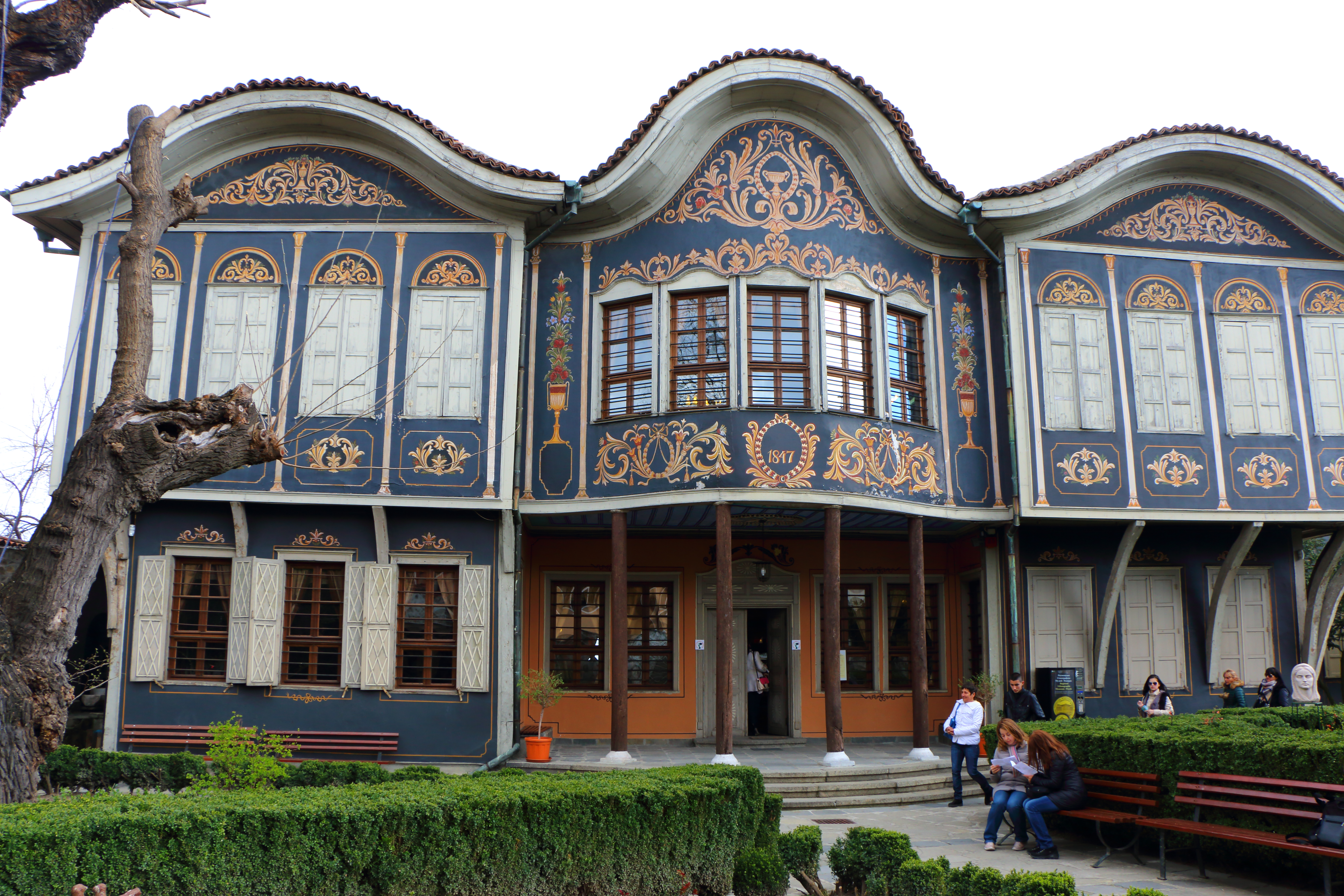
- The Ethnographic Museum in Plovdiv (2014)

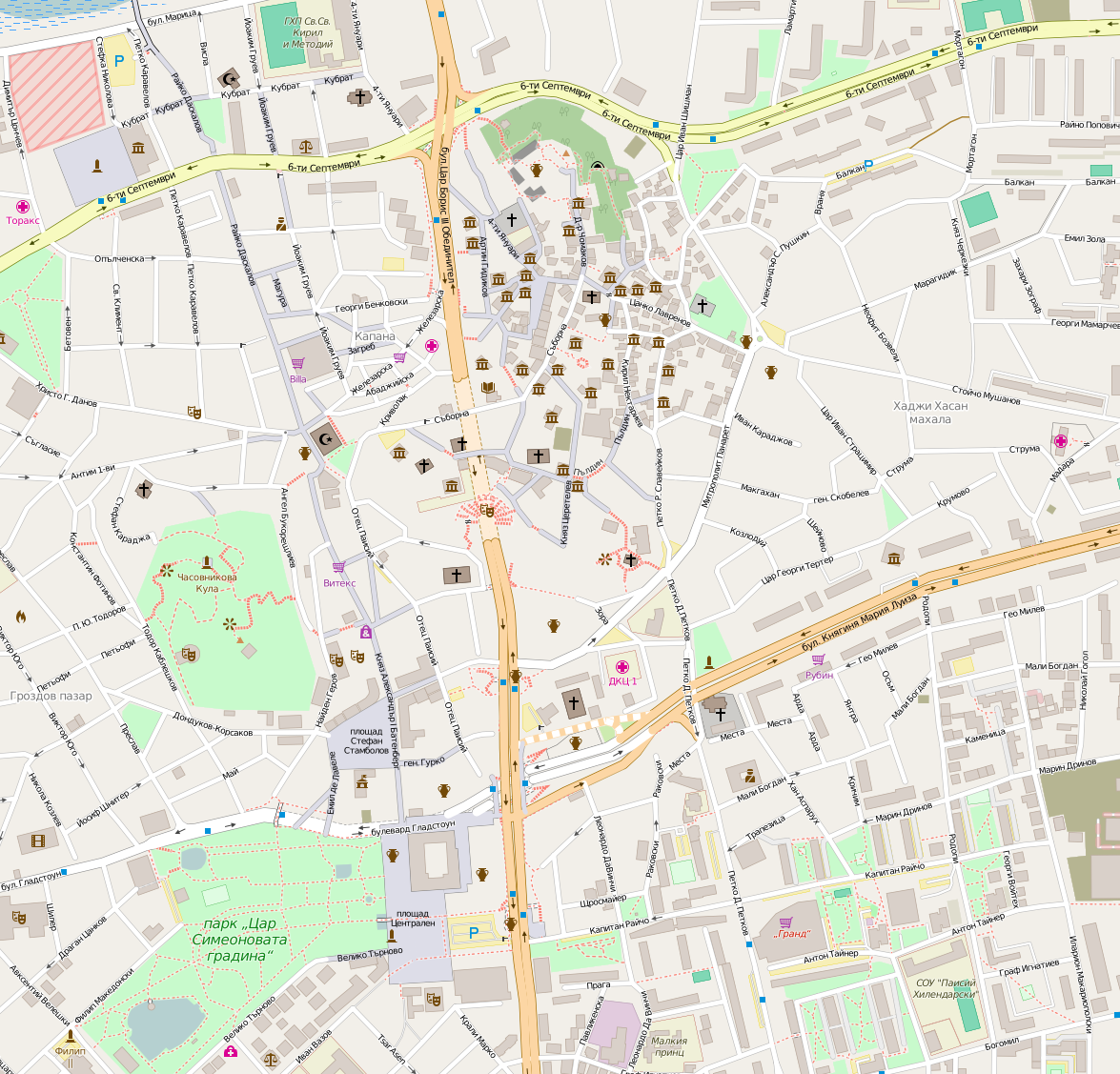
- Location within Plovdiv City Center
- Former name: Municipal Museum House; People's Ethnographic Museum
- Established: 1917
- Location: 2, Dr. Chomakov str., 4000 Plovdiv
- Coordinates: 42.150000°N 24.753056°E
- Type: Ethnographic museum, Historic site
- Collection size: 40,000
- Website: www.ethnograph.info

The Plovdiv Regional Ethnographic Museum (Bulgarian: Регионален етнографски музей — Пловдив, Regionalen etnografski muzey — Plovdiv) is a museum of ethnography in Plovdiv, Bulgaria. Since 1938, it has occupied the 1847 house of the merchant, Argir Kuyumdzhioglu, in the city's Old Town. The museum features six exhibitions, each occupying a separate room.

== History ==
Although there had been plans to organize a museum of ethnography in Plovdiv as early as 1891, it was not until 1917 that a Regional Museum was established thanks to the efforts of Stoyu Shishkov, a local scholar and journalist. Shishkov was the museum's first secretary and only employee. In 1931–32, the collection of 500 items was transferred to the Plovdiv National Library and Museum. In 1938, the museum was revived as the Municipal Museum House thanks to the mayor of Plovdiv, Bozhidar Zdravkov, and was organized in the Kuyumdzhioglu House. The museum was officially reopened on 14 October 1943; six years later, the Municipal Museum House became the People's Ethnographic Museum. A permanent exhibition was arranged in 1952 and revised substantially in 1962.

Today, the Plovdiv Regional Ethnographic Museum has a collection of over 40,000 exhibits distributed among the agriculture, crafts, fabrics and clothing, furniture and interior, musical instruments, religious items and works of art exhibits. In addition, the museum boasts a scholarly archive, a library and a photo archive.

== Building ==
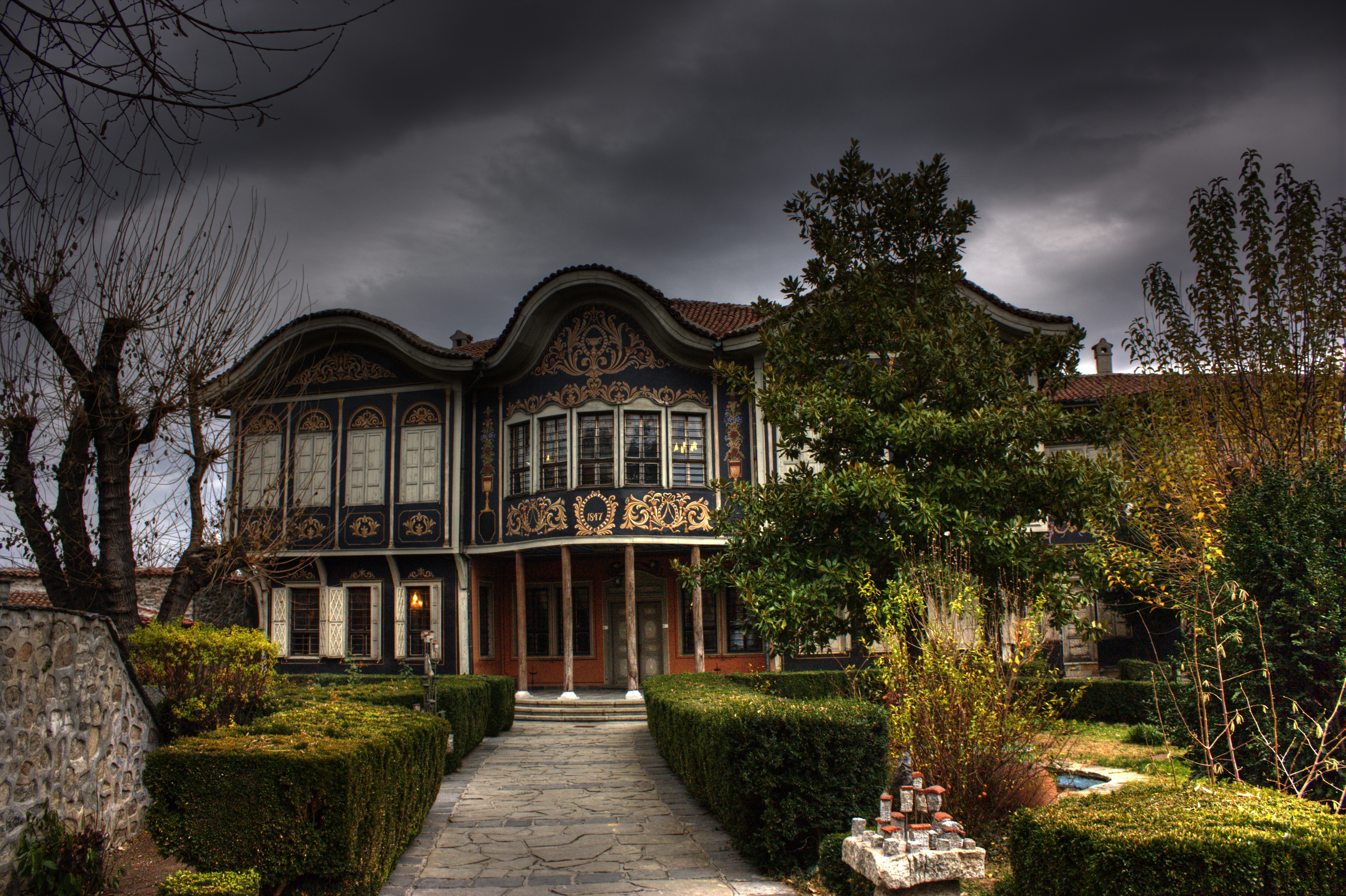
The Plovdiv Regional Ethnographic Museum occupies the 1847 Kuyumdzhioglu House

The Kuyumdzhioglu House, the museum's home, was built in 1847 for the Plovdiv merchant, Argir Hristov Kuyumdzhioglu. He was a prominent homespun trader who owned a company in Vienna. The house was constructed by Hadzhi Georgi, from the Rhodopean village of Kosovo, and has been described as a prime example of Plovdiv's mid-19th century Baroque architecture. The house has a symmetric facade; it is two stories tall on its west side and four stories tall on its east side, employing the natural denivelation. The Kuyumdzhioglu House lies near the Plovdiv Old Town's eastern gate, the Fortress Gate (Хисар капия, Hisar kapia), and spreads over 570 square metres (6,100 sq ft). It has 12 rooms and airy salons. Both the house's interior and exterior decoration rely on sophisticated floral motives. The ceiling in each room is wood-carved. The house has an inner yard with a garden.

After the Liberation of Bulgaria from Ottoman rule in 1878, Argir Kuyumdzhioglu left Plovdiv to settle in Vienna. From 1898 to 1902, the house was used as a girls' boarding house. Following that it was used by Garabet Karagyozyan's millinery factory, as a flour warehouse and as a vinegar factory. In 1930, it was acquired by the Bulgarian tobacco merchant, Antonio Colaro (Antonii Kolarov from Rouse). Colaro intended to demolish the house and build a tobacco warehouse, but he was denied permission by the Plovdiv municipality. The municipality bought the house in 1938, carried out renovations, and organized the museum.

== Gallery ==
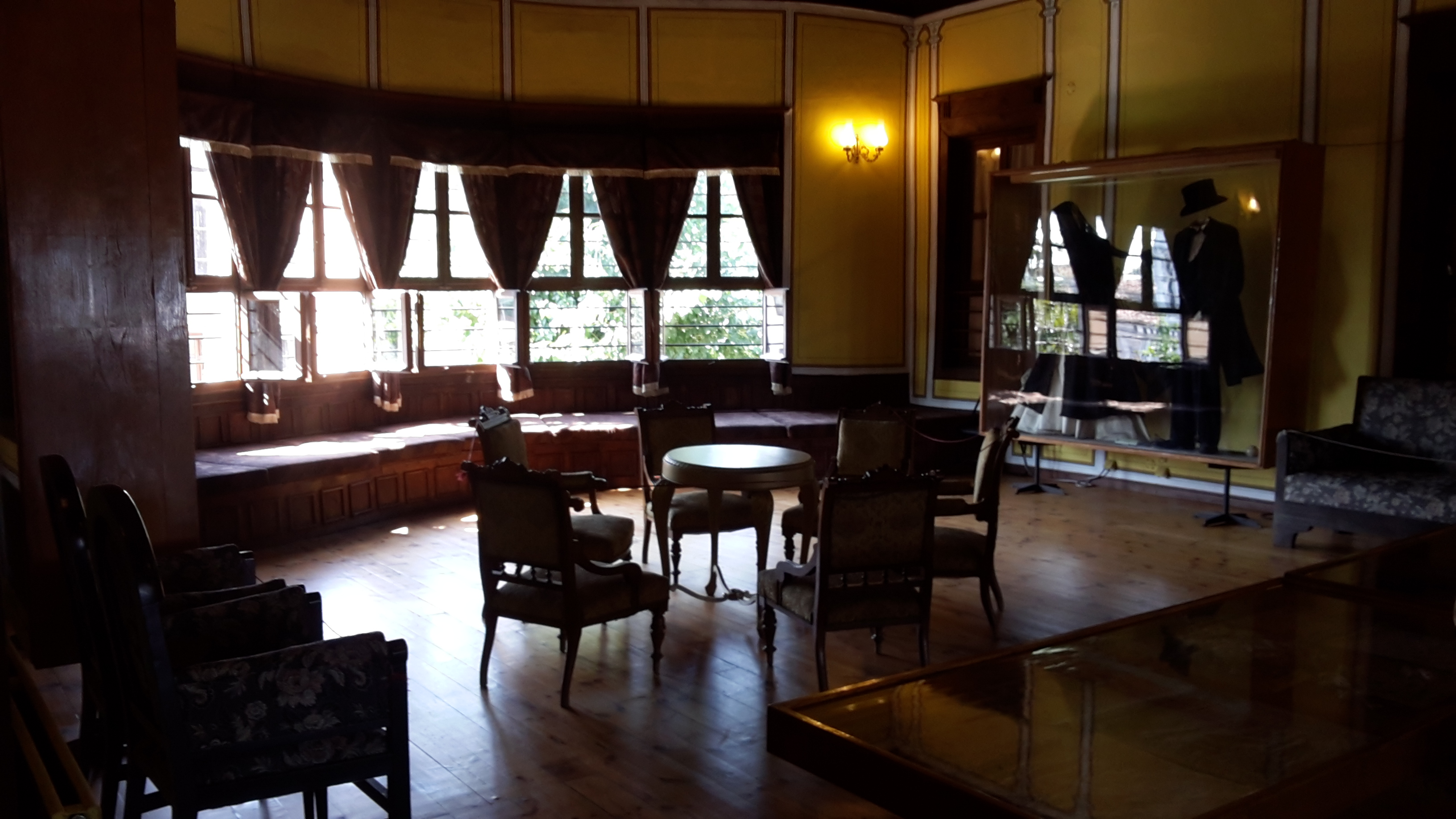

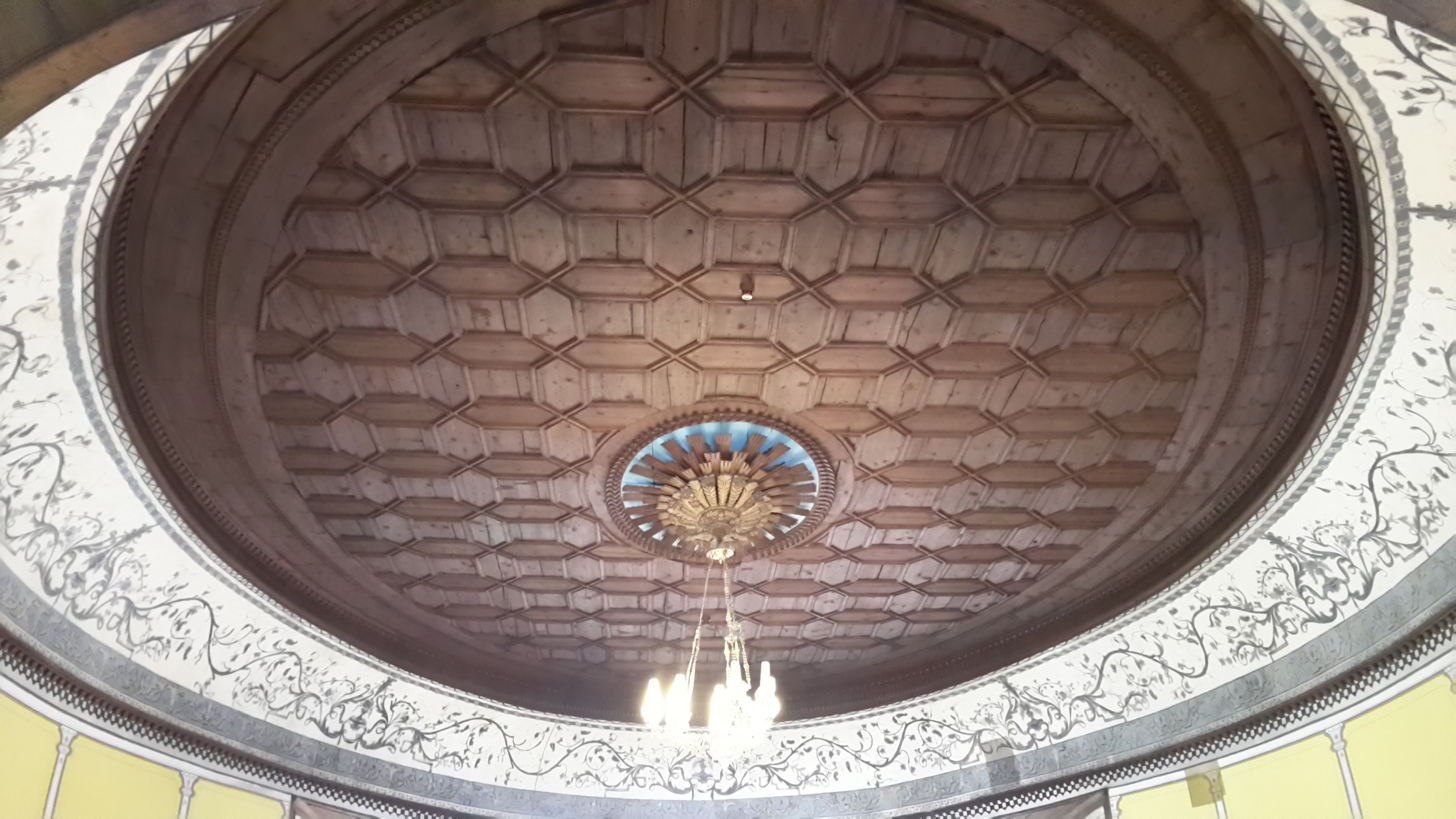

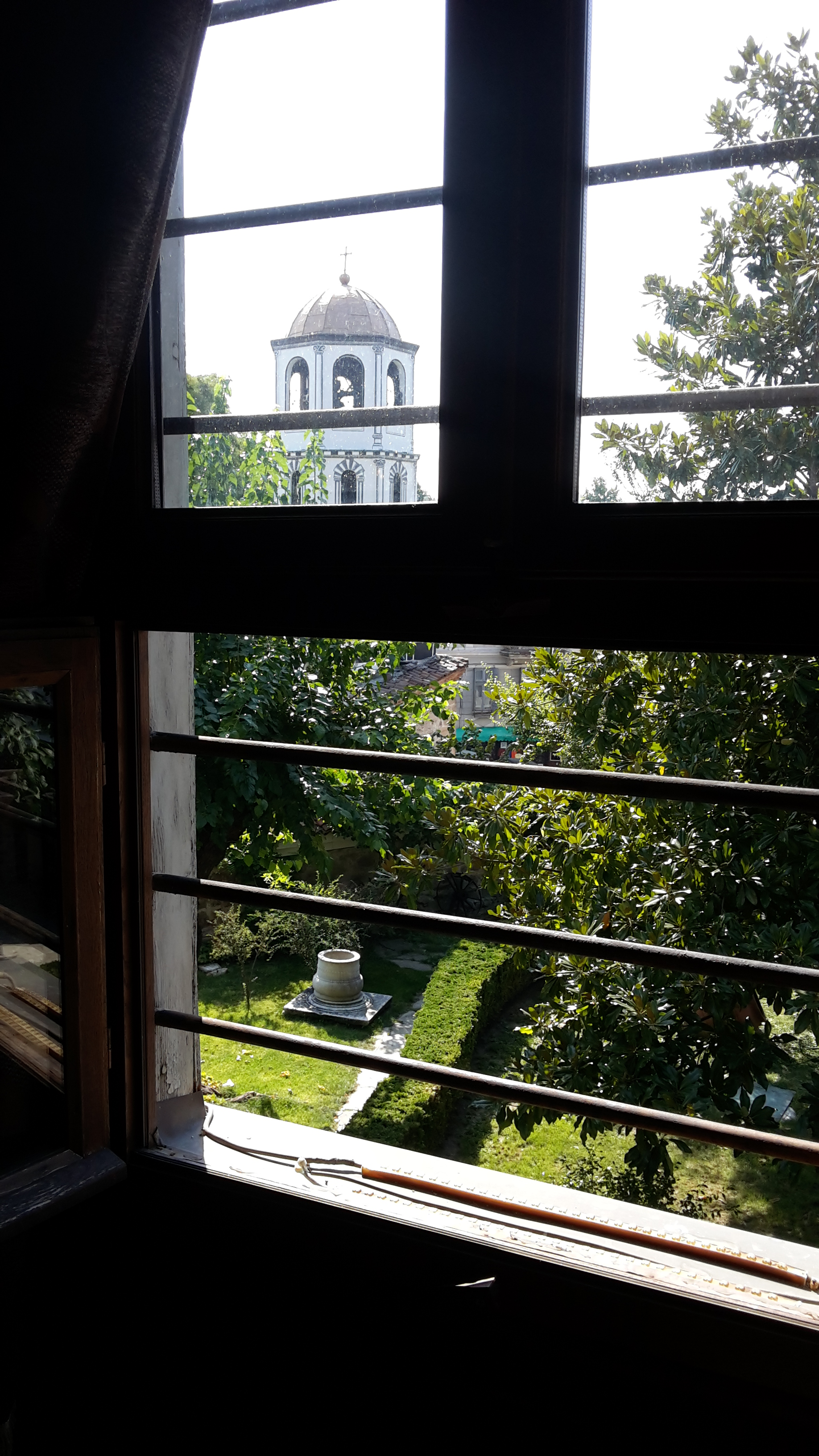
