= Names of European cities in different languages (N–P) =

Different names for European cities in neighbouring languages

The names used for some major European cities differ in different European and sometimes non-European languages. In some countries where there are two or more languages spoken, such as Belgium or Switzerland, dual forms may be used within the city itself, for example on signage. This is also the case in Ireland, despite a low level of actual usage of the Irish language. In other cases where a regional language is officially recognised, that form of the name may be used in the region, but not nationally. Examples include the Welsh language in Wales in the United Kingdom, and regional languages in parts of Italy and Spain.

There is a slow trend to return to the local name, which has been going on for a long time. In English Livorno is now used, the old English form of Leghorn having become antiquated at least a century ago. In some cases, such as the replacement of Danzig with Gdańsk, the official name has been changed more recently. Since 1995, the government of Ukraine has encouraged the use of Kyiv rather than Kiev.

== N ==
English name	Other names or former names
(Netherlands) Naarden	Naarden (Dutch), Naarnten – Νάαρντεν (Greek), Narden – Նարդեն (Armenian), Narden – Нарден (Macedonian, Russian, Ukrainian), Nardenas (Lithuanian), Nareudeon – 나르던 (Korean), Naruden – ナールデン (Japanese), Nʾrdn – נארדן (Hebrew), Nạrdn – ناردن (Arabic)
(Hungary) Nagykanizsa	Nagykanizsa or Kanizsa (Hungarian), Kan(j)iža (Croatian), Velika Kan(j)iža (Croatian, Großkirchen (German), Groß-Kanizsa (German), Velika Kaniža (Slovene), Kanije (Turkish), Velika Kanјiža – Велика Кањижа (Serbian).
(Slovakia) Námestovo	Namestovas (Lithuanian*), Námestovo (Slovak*), Nāmestovo (Latvian*), Námesztó (Hungarian*), Namiestów (Polish*)
(Slovakia) Nemšová	Nemsó (Hungarian*), Nemšová (Slovak*), Nemšová – Њемшова (Serbian*)
(Belgium) Namur	Naemen (Zeelandic*), Namen (Dutch*, Western Frisian*), Name (Limbugish*), Nameur (Picard*, Walloon*), Namīra (Latvian*), Namiūras (Lithuanian*), Namouer (Luxembourgish*), Namur (French*, German*), Namür (Azerbaijani*, alternative German*), Namurcum (Latin*), Namuro (Esperanto*), Noamn (West Flemish*)
(France) Nancy	Nanci (Portuguese, rare)*, Nancy (Dutch, English, French, German, Romanian), Nanzeg (Luxembourgish), Nanzig (old German, Rhine Franconian), 낸시 (Korean), Nansi – Нанси (Serbian).
(France) Nantes	Nangteu/Nangt'ŭ - 낭트 (Korean), Nánti - Νάντη (Greek), Nantes (Dutch, French), Nanto - ナント (Japanese)*, Naoned/An Naoned (Breton)*, Naunnt (Gallo), Nant – Нант (Serbian)
(Greece) Naoussa	Náousa - Νάουσα (Greek), Negush - Негуш (Macedonian, Bulgarian), Ağostos (Turkish)
(Italy) Naples	Napule (Neapolitan), Napoli (Albanian*, Italian, Indonesian*, Finnish, Norwegian, Romanian, Scottish Gaelic*, Turkish), Napels (Afrikaans, Dutch, Frisian), Naples (French, Scots*), Naplez (Breton*), Napli (Maltese), Nápoles (Portuguese, Spanish), Napoles (Tagalog*) Nápoli - Νάπολη (modern Greek), Napolo (Esperanto), Nàpols (Catalan), Nápols (Aragonese), Nápoly (Hungarian), Nābūlī (Arabic), Napolli/Nap'olli - 나폴리 (Korean), Napori - ナポリ (Japanese)*, Napulj (Croatian, Serbian), Neapel (German, Swedish), Neapelj (Slovene), Neapol (Azeri, Czech, Polish, Slovak), Neapol' - Неаполь (Russian, Ukrainian), Neapole (Latvian, old Romanian), Neapolis (Latin, Lithuanian), Neápolis - Νεάπολις (ancient Greek), 拿坡里 (Chinese), Neapol - Неапол (Bulgarian), Neap'oli - ნეაპოლი (Georgian*)
(France) Narbonne	Narbo or Narbo Martius (Latin), Narbona (Catalan, Italian, Occitan, Portuguese*, Spanish), Narbonne (Dutch, English, French, German, Romanian), Narbona – Нарбона (Serbian)
(Norway) Narvik	Áhkanjárga (Northern Sami), Narviika (Northern Sami alternate), Narvique (Portuguese)*, Narwik (Polish), Narbhaig (Scottish Gaelic), Victoriahavn (former name 1887–98), Nareubikeu/Narŭbik'ŭ - 나르비크 (Korean)
(Belarus) Navahrudak	Naugardukas (Lithuanian), Navahradak - Наваградак (Belarusian, archaic), Nowogródek (Polish), Novogrudok - Новогрудок (Russian)
(Spain) Nerja	Nerja (Spanish), Narixa (Arabic)
(Slovakia) Nesvady	Nesvady (Slovak*), Naszvad (Hungarian*), Njesvadi (Serbo-Croatian*)
(Belgium) Neufchâteau	Li Tchestea (Walloon*), Neufchâteau (French*), Novum Castrum (Latin)
(Switzerland) Neuchâtel	Neuchâtel (French, Romanian), Neuenburg (German), Nešatel – Нешател (Serbian), Nôchâtél (Arpitan)
(United Kingdom) (England) Newcastle upon Tyne	An Caisteal Nuadh (Scottish Gaelic*), An Caisleán Nua (Irish), Nova Castra (Latin), Newcastle upon Tyne (Dutch *, French*, German*, Italian*, Polish*, Scots*, Spanish*, Welsh*), 纽卡素 (Chinese), Njukasl na Tajnu – Њукасл на Тајну (Serbian)
(United Kingdom) (Wales) Newport (Monmouthshire)	Casnewydd (Welsh*, Irish, Scottish Gaelic), Novus Burgus (Latin), Njuport – Њупорт (Serbian)
(France) Nice	Niça (Catalan*, Occitan), Nice (Albanian*, French*, Portuguese*, Scottish Gaelic*, Swedish*, Welsh* ), Nizza (Italian*, Finnish*, German*, Hungarian, Maltese, former Swedish*), Nica (Latvian, Lithuanian*, Slovene*), Nica or Nitsa - Ница (Belarusian, Bulgarian*, Serbian*), Nicaea (Latin)*, Nitstsa - Ницца (Russian)*, Nicea (Polish)*, Nico (Esperanto)*, Níkea - Νίκαια (Greek), Nis (Turkish), Nisa (Romanian)*, Nissa (Piedmontese, Occitan variant*, Provençal), Nīsu - ニース (Japanese)*, Nitsa – ნიცა (Georgian*), Niza (Spanish* Tagalog*), Niseu/Nisŭ - 니스 (Korean), 尼斯 (Chinese), نیس (Persian)
(Belgium) Nieuwpoort	Nieuport (French*, Occitan*), Nieuwpoort (Dutch*), Nieuwpôort (West Flemish*), Niuvportas (Lithuanian), Novus Portus (Latin)
(Netherlands) Nieuwpoort	N'ivport – Ньивпорт (Russian), Nieuwpoort (Dutch), Nieuwpoorte (Zeelandic), Novus Portus (Latin), Nyuport – Нюпорт (Ukrainian), Nywbwrt – نيوبورت (Egyptian Arabic)
(Netherlands) Nieuwstadt	De Nuujsjtad (Limburgish), N'ivstadt – Ньивстадт (Russian), Nieuwstadt (Dutch), Niusutauto – ニーウスタウト (Japanese), Nwšṭʾdṭ – נוישטאדט (Hebrew), Nyustadt – Нюстадт (Ukrainian)
(Netherlands) Nijkerk	Naikeruku – ナイケルク (Japanese), Najkerk – Најкерк (Macedonian), Neikeoreukeu – 네이커르크 (Korean), Neikerkas (Lithuanian), Nejkerk – Нейкерк (Belarusian, Russian, Ukrainian), Neykerk – Նեյկերկ (Armenian), Niekark (Low Saxon), Nijkerk (Dutch), Nijkerke (Zeelandic), Nyqrq – נייקרק (Hebrew)
(Netherlands) Nijmegen	Nijmege (Limburgish), Nijmegen (Dutch*, Romanian), Nimega (Catalan, Italian, Portuguese variant, Spanish), Nimegue (Portuguese)*, Nimègue (French), Nîmegue (Walloon), Nimwege (local dialect), Nimwegen (German), Noviomagus, Oppidum Batavorum and Ulpia Noviomagus Batavorum (Latin *), نایمیخن (Persian), Najmegen – Најмеген (Serbian), Nymwegen (Frisian)
(Belgium) Ninove	Niniva (Latin), Ninove (Dutch*), Ninovė (Lithuanian)
(France) Niort	Niort (France, Spanish, Portuguese, German, Finnish, Italian, Polish, Romanian), Niōru - ニオール (Japanese)*, Novioritum (Latin), N'or - Ньор (Russian)
(Serbia) Niš	Nish (Albanian), Nis / Nisch (German), Nis / Nish (English, French), Niš - Ниш (Bulgarian, Russian, Serbian), Niš (Slovak, Slovene), Niş (Turkish*), Niŝo (Esperanto), Nissa (English, traditional name, Italian), Nisz (Polish), Nix (Asturianu), Naissus (Latin)
(Slovakia) Nitra	Litra (Turkish*), Neutra (German*), Nitra (Slovak*), Nitria (Latin*), Nitro (Esperanto*), Njitra (Serbo-Croatian*) Nyitra (Hungarian*), Nyitria (alternative Hungarian)
(Belgium) Nivelles	Neivel (Zeelandic*), Neyvel (West Flemish), Nijvel (Dutch*), Nivelles (French*), Nivele (Walloon*), Nivèle (Picard*), Nivelis (Lithuanian), Nivigella (Latin*)
(Sweden) Norsjö	Nåarene (Southern Sami), Norsjö (Swedish), Nuoráne (Ume Sami)
(Slovakia) Nová Baňa	Königsberg (German*), Nová Baňa (Slovak*), Nova Banja (Serbo-Croatian*), Újbánya (Hungarian*)
(Slovakia) Nová Dubnica	Neudubnitz (German*), Nová Dubnica (Slovak*), Nova Dubnica (Lithuanian*, Latvian*), Újtölgyes (Hungarian*)
(Slovakia) Nováky	Anfänger (German*), Novāki (Latvian*), Nováky (Slovak*), Nyitranovák (Hungarian*)
(Slovakia) Nové Mesto nad Váhom	Neustadt(l) an der Waag (German*), Nove Mestas prie Vaho (Lithuanian*), Nové Mesto nad Váhom (Slovak*), Nowe Miasto nad Wagiem (Polish*), Nove Mesto pie Vāhas (Latvian*), Vágújhely (Hungarian*), Vág-Újhely (alternative Hungarian), Waag-Neustadt(l) (alternative German)
(Slovakia) Nové Zámky	Castrum Novum (alternative Latin), Érsekújvár (Hungarian*), Neoselium (Latin*), Neuhäusel (German*), Nové Zámky (Slovak*), Uyvar (Turkish*)
(Russia) Nizhny Novgorod	Ala osh - Ала ош (Moksha), Alauz'lidn (Veps), Aloosh - Алоош (Erzya), Alyn Novgorod - Алын Новгород (Sakha), Čulhula - Чулхула (Chuvash), Dood Novgorod - Доод Новгород (Mongol), Gorky (former name 1932–90), Lejasnovgoroda (former Latvian), Makarya - Макарья/Макаръя (Komi Permyak, Komi Zyrian), Nijeuninobeugorodeu/Nichŭninobŭgorodŭ - 니즈니노브고로드 (Korean), Nijgar - Нижгар (alternative name in Tatar)*, Nijni-Novgorod (French, Romanian, Turkish), Nischnij Nowgorod (German), Nižni Novgorod (Finnish, Serbian, Slovene), Nižni Noŭharad - Ніжні Ноўгарад (Belarusian), Nižnij Novgorod - Нижний Новгород (Russian), Nižnij Novgorod (Czech), Ņižņijnovgoroda (Latvian), Nižny Novgordas (Lithuanian), Nižný Novgorod (Slovak), Nowogród (Polish), Nyizsnyij Novgorod (Hungarian), Tübän Novgorod - Түбән Новгород (Tatar)*, Ugarman - Угарман (Hill Mari, Meadow Mari), Xiànuòfūgēluódé - 下诺夫哥罗德 (Chinese)
(United Kingdom) (England) Nottingham	Nottingham (English), Nottinghamia (Latin), Snotingaham (Old English), Tig Guocobauc (Old Welsh)
(Russia) Novgorod	see Veliky Novgorod
(Serbia) Novi Sad	Neoplanta (Latin), Neusatz (German), Nobisadeu / Nobisadŭ - 노비사드 (Korean)*, Novi Sad (Azeri, Croatian, Portuguese, Romanian, Slovene, Spanish), Novi Sad - Нови Сад (Bulgarian, Montenegrin, Macedonian, Ruthenian, Russian, Serbian), Novi Sadas (Lithuanian), Novisada (Latvian), Nový Sad (Czech, Slovak), Nowy Sad (Polish), Újvidék (Hungarian)
(Poland) Nowy Sącz	Neu-Sandez (German), Nowy Sącz (Polish), Novy-Sonch - Новы-Сонч (Russian), Sandz - סאַנדז (Yiddish), Újszandec (old Hungarian)
(Italy) Nuoro	Nugoro (Sardinian), Nuoro (Italian)
(Germany) Nuremberg	Nürnberg (Estonian, Finnish, German, Indonesian*, Russian, Hungarian, Swedish, Norwegian, Scottish Gaelic*, Turkish, Slovene), Nämberch (Franconian), Näöreberg (Limburgish), Neurenberch (West Frisian), Neurenberg (Dutch), Niremvéryi - Νυρεμβέργη (Greek), Nirnberg – Нирнберг (Serbian), Nirnberga (Latvian), Niǔlúnbǎo - 纽伦堡 (Chinese), Niurnbergas (Lithuanian), Norimberg (Slovak), Norimberga (Italian), Norimberk (Czech, old Slovene), Nörnberg (Low Saxon), Norymberga (Polish), Nuremberg (Scots*), Núremberg (Spanish), Nurembergu (Albanian),Nuremberga (Portuguese), Nürenberg (Romanian), Nwireunbereukeu/Nwirŭnberŭk'ŭ - 뉘른베르크 (Korean), Nyurumberuku - ニュルンベルク (Japanese)*, نورمبرگ (Persian)
(Denmark) (Greenland) Nuuk	Godthåb (Danish)*

== O ==
English name	Other names or former names
(France) Obernai	Oberehnheim (German*), Obernai (French*, German*)
(Ukraine) Ochakiv	Ochakiv - Очаків (Ukrainian), Vozia or Oceacov (Romanian), Alektoros - Ἀλέκτορος (Greek), Ochakov - Очаков (Russian), Özü (Crimean Tatar)
(Ukraine) Odesa	Ades - אַדעס (Yiddish), Hacıbey (obsolete Turkish), Odesa (Latvian, Romanian, Turkish), Odesa - Одеса (Bulgarian, Serbian, Ukrainian), Odesa – ოდესა (Georgian*), Odesa - 오데사 (Korean), Oděsa (Czech), Odessa (Azeri, Polish, Turkish variant), Odessa - Одесса (Russian), Odèssa (Arpitan*), Odessza (Hungarian), Odhissós - Οδησσός (Greek)
(Denmark) Odense	Odense (Danish), Odensė - Òdensė (Lithuanian), Óðinsvé or Óðinsey (Old Norse), Othensia (Latin), Ottensee (German), Ottonia (Latin)
(North Macedonia) Ohrid	Akhrídha - Αχρίδα (Greek variant), Ochryda (Polish), Ocrida (Italian), Ohër (Albanian), Ohri (Turkish), Ohrid - Охрид (Bulgarian, Macedonian, Serbian), Ohrid (Slovene), Okhrídha - Οχρίδα (Greek). Older Graeco-Illyrian names include Dyassarites, Lychnis, Lychnidos
(Netherlands) Oisterwijk	O'sterveyk – Օստերվեյկ (Armenian), Oisterveikas (Lithuanian), Oisterwiek (Low Saxon, Zeelandic), Oisterwijk (Dutch), Oisuteruweiku – オーイステルウェイク (Japanese), Ojstervejk – Ойстервейк (Russian), Ostervejk – Остервейк (Ukrainian), Osterveyk (Azeri), Ạ̉wystrfạyk – أويسترفايك (Arabic)
(Italy) Olbia	Olbia (Italian), Tarranoa (Corsican), Terranoa (Sardinian), Terranova Pausania (former Italian)
(Germany) Oldenburg	Oldemburgo (Italian, Portuguese, Spanish), Oldenbörg (Gronings), Oldenburg (German), Ollenborg (Low Saxon), Ooldenbuurich (Saterland Frisian), Starogard (Polish, Serbian)
(Netherlands) Oldenzaal	O'ldenzal – Օլդենզալ (Armenian), Oldenjal – 올덴잘 (Korean), Oldenzaal (Dutch), Oldenzael (Zeelandic), Oldenzal – Олдензал (Belarusian, Russian, Ukrainian), Oldnzel (Low German, Low Saxon), Orudenzaru – オルデンザール (Japanese), ʾWldnzʾʾl – אולדנזאאל (Hebrew), Ạ̉wldnzạl – أولدنزال (Arabic)
(Poland) Olkusz	Hilcus (Latin), Ilkenau (German 1942–45), Ilkusz (former Polish), Olkusch (German), Olkusz (Polish)
(Czech Republic) Olomouc	Alamóc (archaic Hungarian), Holomóc (Hanakian Czech dialect), Iuliomontium (Latin), Olmütz (German), Olomóc (Hanakian Czech dialect), Olomouc (Czech), Olomucium (Latin), Olomuncium (Latin), Ołomuniec (Polish)
(Denmark) Ølstykke	Elstiukė (Lithuanian), Ølstykke (Danish, Norwegian)
(Poland) Olsztyn	Allenstein (German), Olštinas (Lithuanian), Ol'štyn - Ольштын (Russian), Olsztyn (Polish)
(Romania) Onești	Onești (Romania), Onyest (Hungarian)
(Croatia) Opatija	Abbazia (Italian, Austrian German), Abbázia (Hungarian), Opatija (Bosnian, Croatian, Serbian, Slovene), Sankt Jakobi ( German, historic)
(Czech Republic) Opava	Opava (Czech), Opavia (Latin), Opawa (Polish), Troppau (German)
(Poland) Opole	Opole (Polish), Opolí (Czech), Oppeln (German)
(Romania) Oradea	Gran Varadino (Italian), Großwardein (German), Magno-Varadinum (Latin variant), Nagyvárad (Hungarian), Oradea (Romanian, Polish), Oradea-Mare (former Romanian), Oradia – ორადია (Georgian*), Varadinum (Latin), Varat (Turkish), Veliki Varadin - Велики Варадин (Serbian)
(Germany) Oranienburg	Bocov (Czech), Bötzow (former German), Oranienburg (German)
(Sweden) Örebro	Örebro (Swedish)
(Russia) Orenburg	Arenburh - Арэнбург (Belarusian*), Ărenpur - Ăренпур (Chuvash*), Chkalov (English 1938–1957), Čkalov - Чкалов (Russian 1938–1957),^{[KNAB]} Irımbur - Ырымбур (Bashkir*),^{[KNAB]} Irınbur - Ырынбур (Tatar*), Oremburgo (Portuguese*, Spanish*), Orenbourg (French*),^{[KNAB]} Orenburg (German*), Orenburg - Оренбург (Russian*),^{[KNAB]} Orenburgum (Latin*), Orenburh - Оренбург (Ukrainian*), Orınbor - Орынбор (Kazakh*),^{[KNAB]} Orynbor - Орынбор (Meadow Mari*)
(Italy) Oristano	Aristanis (Sardinian), Oristán (Spanish), Oristano (Italian), Oristany (Catalan)
(Sweden) Örnsköldsvik	Örnsköldsvik (Swedish), Orrestaare (Southern Sami)
(Croatia) Osijek	Esseg (former German), Eszék (Hungarian), Mursa (Latin), Osek (Slovene), Osiek (Polish, early Croatian), Osijek (Bosnian, Croatian, Czech, Dutch, Finnish, French, German, Romanian, Swedish), Osijek - Осијек (Serbian), Osijekas (Lithuanian), Osik (Ikavian - Shokac), 'Ōsīyēk - โอซีเยค (Thai)
(Norway) Oslo	Àosīlù - 奧斯陸 (Chinese), Asloa (Latin), Christiania (former Dano-Norwegian name 1624–1925), Kristiania (late version of former name), Oseullo/Osŭllo - 오슬로 (Korean), Oslas (Lithuanian), Oslo (Azeri, Indonesian, Catalan, Danish, Dutch, Esperanto, Estonian, Finnish, French, German, Italian, Latvian, Maltese, Norwegian, Polish, Portuguese, Romanian, Scots *, Scottish Gaelic *, Serbian, Slovene, Spanish, Swedish, Turkish), Oslo – ოსლო (Georgian*), Osló (Irish), Ósló (Icelandic), Oslove (Southern Sami), Osuro - オスロ (Japanese)*, Ūslū (Arabic), اسلو (Persian)
(Germany) Osnabrück	Ansibarium (Latin), Àosīnàbùlǔkè - 奧斯納布魯克 (Mandarin Chinese*), Osenbrugge (archaic Dutch), Oseunabeulwikeu - 오스나브뤼크 (Korean*), Osnabrik - Оснабрик (Serbian*), Osnabruga (Latin*), Osnabrugge (archaic Dutch), Osnabrück (Dutch*, German*, Romanian*, Turkish*), Osnabrük - (archaic Estonian),^{[KNAB]} Osnabruque (Portuguese alternative*), Osnaburg (archaic English), Osnabryuk - Оснабрюк (Bulgarian*, Russian*,^{[KNAB]} Ukrainian*), Osnebrog (Gronings), Ossenbrügge (Westphalian/Low German*), Osunaburyukku - オスナブリュック (Japanese*)
(Belgium) Ostend	Oostende (Dutch*), Oôstende (Zeelandic*), Oostenn (Low German*), Ostándi - Οστάνδη (Greek), Ostenda (Italian*, Polish*), Ostend (English*, Scots, Slovenian, Uzbek*, Waray*), Ostenda (Latin*), Ostende (Azerbaijani, Basque*, Czech, French, German, Latvian*, Portuguese, Romanian, Serbo-Croatian* Silesian*, Serbian, Spanish*, West Flemish*), Ostendė (Lithuanian*), Ostendo (Esperanto), Ostinde (Walloon*)
(Sweden) Östersund	Luvlieluspie (former Southern Sami), Östersund (Swedish), Østersund (Danish, Norwegian), Staare (Southern Sami)
(Czech Republic) Ostrava	Ostrau (German), Ostrava (Czech, Slovak, Slovene), Ostrava - Острава (Bulgarian), Ost'rava – ოსტრავა (Georgian*), Ostrawa (Polish)
(Poland) Ostróda	Osterode (German), Ostróda (Polish)
(Poland) Ostrów Wielkopolski	Ostrovia (Latin), Ostrów (former Polish), Ostrów Wielkopolski (Polish), Ostrowo (German)
(Poland) Oświęcim	Àosīwēixīn - 奧斯威辛 (Chinese), Âšvits (Persian), Auschwitz (former German*, Romanian), Aushvitsa (Romani), Aušvice (former Latvian), Oshpitizin (Yiddish), Osventsim - Освенцим (Russian), Osvencima (Latvian), آشویتس Osvětim (Czech), Osvienčim (Slovak), Osvyenchim (Romani), Oświęcim (Polish, German*, Italian, Scottish Gaelic)
(Croatia) Otočac	Àotuōchácí – 奧托查茨 (Mandarin Chinese*), Otočac (Croatian*, German, English, Slovenian*), Otočac – Оточац (Russian*, Serbian*, Ukrainian*), Otocsán (Hungarian*), Ottocaz (archaic Italian, archaic German), Ottochaz (archaic German, archaic English), Ottocio (Italian), Ottocium (Latin*), Ottocsaz (archaic German), Ottotschaz (archaic German), Ottotschan (archaic German)
(Belgium) Ottignies-Louvain-la-Neuve	Ocgniye-Li Noû Lovén (Walloon*), Ottignies-Louvain-la-Neuve (French*), Ottiniacum-Novum Lovanium (Latin*)
(Belgium) Oudenaarde	Aldenarda (Latin*), Audenarde (French), Audenardė (Lithuanian), Audenārde (Latvian*), Oudenarde (alternative English), Oudenaarde (Dutch*), Oudenaorde (Zeelandic*), Oudenoarde (West Flemish*)
(Belgium) Oudenburg	Aldenburgensis (Latin), Audembourg (French*), Oednburg (West Flemish*), Oudemburgo (Spanish*), Oudenburg (Dutch*), Ouwenburg (Zeelandic*)
(Finland) Oulu	Oulu (Estonian, Finnish, Polish, Latvian), Uleåborg (Norwegian, Swedish), Uloa (Latin)
(Sweden) Överkalix	Badje-Gáinnas (Northern Sami), Badje-Gájnaj (Lule Sami), Överkalix (Swedish), Ylikainus (Meänkieli), Ylikainuu (Finnish)
(Sweden) Övertorneå	Badjeduornos (Lule Sami), Badje-Duortnus (Northern Sami), Matarengi (Meänkieli, former Swedish), Matarenki (Finnish), Övertorneå (Swedish), Ylitornio (Finnish alternate)
(United Kingdom) (England) Oxford	Àth nan Damh (Scottish Gaelic *), Áth na nDamh (Irish *), Niújìn - 牛津 (Chinese), Okkusufōdo - オックスフォード (Japanese)*, Okseupodeu/Oksŭp'odŭ - 옥스포드 (Korean), Oksford (Azeri, Polish, Serbian), Oksforda (Latvian), Uxnafurða (Icelandic), Oksfordas (Lithuanian), Oksfórdhi - Οξφόρδη (Greek), Oksfordo (Esperanto), Oxford (Scots *), Oxford - Оксфорд (Bulgarian, Russian), Oxonia (Latin), Oxónia (Portuguese, rare), Redec'hen (Breton *), Resoghen (Cornish), Rhydychen (Welsh)
(Italy) Ozieri	Ocier (Spanish, Catalan), Othieri (Sardinian), Ozieri (Italian)

== P ==
English name	Other names or former names
(Italy) Padua	Padoue (French), Padova (Italian, Finnish, Maltese, Romanian, Croatian, Czech, Scottish Gaelic*, Serbian, Slovak, Slovene), Padoa (Venetian), Pádova (Hungarian), Padua (Dutch, German, medieval Latin, Scots, Spanish, Swedish), P'adua – პადუა (Georgian*), Pádua (Portuguese), Pàdua (Catalan), Paduja (Latvian), Paduya - Падуя (Russian), Padwa (Polish), Padue (Friulian), Pàdoa (Piedmontese), Pádhoua - Πάδουα / Pádhova - Πάδοβα (Greek), Patavium (classical Latin), Padoba/P'adoba - 파도바 (Korean), 帕多瓦 (Chinese)
(Sweden) Pajala	Bájal (Lule Sami, Northern Sami alternate), Bájil (Northern Sami), Bájel (Lule Sami alternate), Pajala (Finnish, Meänkieli, Swedish)
(Italy) Palermo	Balharm or Balerm (Arabic), Palerm (Catalan), Palerma - Палерма (Belarusian), Palermas (Lithuanian), Palerme (French), Palermo (Azeri, Czech, Dutch, German, Italian, Finnish, Latvian, Maltese, Polish, Portuguese, Romanian, Scots*, Scottish Gaelic*, Serbian, Slovak, Spanish, Swedish, Turkish), Palèrmo (Arpitan*), P'alermo – პალერმო (Georgian*), Palermo - Палермо (Russian), Palermu or Palemmu (Sicilian), Pallereumo/P'allerŭmo - 팔레르모 (Korean), Pánormos - Πάνορμος (Greek), Panormus (Latin), Parerumo - パレルモ (Japanese)*, 巴勒莫 (Chinese)
(Spain) Palma	Palma (Catalan, Finnish, French, German, Hungarian, Irish, Latin), Palma de Mallorca (Danish, Dutch, Polish, Spanish), Palma de Malhorca (Occitan), Palma de Maiorca (Portuguese), Palma di Maiorca (Italian) 팔마 (Korean)
(Spain) Pamplona	Banbalūna - بنبلونة (Arabic), Iruña (Basque), Iruñea (Basque), Pamplona (Azeri, Catalan, Czech, Dutch, Finnish, German, Italian, Portuguese, Romanian, Serbian, Slovak, Spanish, Swedish), Pampelune (French), Pampaluna / Lunapampa (Old Provençal), Pampeluna (Polish), Pampeullona / P'amp'ŭllona - 팜플로나 (Korean)*, Pompaelo (Latin), P'amp'lona – პამპლონა (Georgian*), 潘普洛纳 (Chinese)
(Lithuania) Panevėžys	Panevēža (Latvian), P'anevezhisi – პანევეჟისი (Georgian*), Poniewież (Polish), Ponevezh - Паневежис (Russian), Ponewesch (German), פּאָנעװעזש - Ponevezh (Yiddish), Ponevěž (old Czech)
(France) Paris	Paris (Azeri, French, German, Norwegian, Portuguese, Piedmontese, Romanian, Swedish, Tagalog*, Turkish), Parigi (Italian), Paras (Scottish Gaelic)*, Bārīs (Arabic), Lutetia Parisiorum (Latin), Paräis (Luxembourgish), Páras (Irish), Pari - パリ (Japanese)*, Pari/P'ari - 파리 (Korean), Paries (Limburgish), Pariġi (Maltese), Pariis (Estonian), Pariisi (Finnish), Parijs (Dutch), París (Catalan, Spanish, Icelandic), Pa-ris or Ba-lê (Vietnamese, the latter is old-fashioned), Parísi - Παρίσι (Greek) / Parísii - Παρίσιοι (medieval Greek, καθαρεύουσα), Parisium (medieval Latin), Pariz (Breton, Croatian, Slovene), Pariž - Париж (Bulgarian, Russian, Ukrainian), Paříž (Czech), Pariz - Париз (Serbian), Paríž (Slovak), Pariz - פּאַריז (Yiddish), Parīze (Latvian), P'arizi – პარიზი (Georgian*), Parizo (Esperanto), Párizs (Hungarian), Parys (Afrikaans, Frisian), Paryż (Polish), Paryžius (Lithuanian), Paryž - Парыж (Belarusian), Bālí - 巴黎 (Chinese), Pērī প্যারী (Bengali),
(Italy) Parma	Parme (French), Párma (Hungarian), Párma - Πάρμα (Greek), P'arma – პარმა (Georgian*), Parma (Italian, Czech, Maltese, Slovak), Pareuma / P'arŭma - 파르마 (Korean)*, Paruma - パルマ (Japanese)*
(Estonia) Pärnu	Parnawa (Polish), Pärnu (Basque, Danish, Estonian, Finnish, Norwegian, Portuguese, Swedish, alternative German spelling), Pernau (German), Pērnava (Latvian), Pernov - Пернов (former Russian), Pernu (Lithuanian), P'iarnu – პიარნუ (Georgian*)
(Slovakia) Partizánske	Baťovany (archaic Slovak), Partizánske (Slovak*), Partizánske – Партизанске (Serbian*), Šimonovany (archaic Slovak), Simony (Hungarian*)
(Germany) Passau	Batavia Bavariae (medieval Latin), Castra Batava (Latin), Pasawa (Polish), Pasov (Czech, Slovak), P'asau – პასაუ (Georgian*), Passau (Dutch, French, German, Romanian, Turkish), Passavia (Italian), Pasava (Serbian), Båssa (Bavarian), 帕绍 (Chinese)
(Greece) Patras	Patra (Modern Greek, Turkish), Patrae (Latin), Patrasso (Italian), Patras (Azeri, Dutch, French, German)
(Italy) Pavia	Pavia (Italian, German, Dutch), Ticinum (classical Latin), Papia (medieval Latin), Pavìa (Piedmontese), Pavio (Esperanto), Paviya - Павия (Russian), Pavija - Павија (Serbian), P'avia – პავია (Georgian), Pavia - Παβία / Papia - Παπία (Greek), 帕维亚 (Chinese)
(Croatia) Pazin	Mitterburg (German), Pazin (Croatian, Serbian), Pisino (Italian),
(Russia) Pechory	Pechory - Печёры (Russian), Petschur (former German), Petseri (Estonian, Finnish), Peczora (Polish), Pečori (Latvian)
(Hungary) Pécs	Beci (old Romanian), Pětikostelí (Czech), Päťkostolie (Slovak), Peç (Turkish), Pečuh (Croatian), Fünfkirchen (German), Pecz (Polish), Pięciokościoły (old Polish), Pečuj - Печуј (Serbian), Quinqueecclesiae (Latin), Sopianae (old Latin), Cinquechiese (old Italian), P'echi – პეჩი (Georgian*), Печ (Macedonian), Sophianè - Σοφιανή (Byzantine Greek)
(Germany) Peenemünde	Peenemünde (German), Pianoujście (Polish)
(Belgium) Peer	Peer (Dutch*), Peras (Lithuanian)
(United Kingdom) (England) Penrith	Pen Rhudd (Welsh), Pioraid (Scottish Gaelic)*, Peerit (Scots)
(Russia) Perm	Perm (English, German, Czech, Finnish), Пермь (Russian), Permjo (Esperanto), Perma (Latvian), 彼尔姆 (Chinese)
(France) Perpignan	Perpignan (Dutch, French, Finnish, German, Romanian), Perpignano (Italian), Perpiñán (Spanish), Perpinhan (Occitan), Perpinhã / Perpinhão (Portuguese)*, Perpinjan (Serbian), Perpinyà (Catalan)
(Italy) Perugia	Pèrousa (Arpitan*), Pérouse (French), Peruja / P'eruja - 페루자 (Korean)*, Perūja - ペルージャ (Japanese)*, Perugia (Dutch, German, Italian, Romanian), Perúgia (Portuguese), Perusa (Spanish), Perusia (Latin), Perúsia (Old Portuguese), P'eruja – პერუჯა (Georgian*), Perusia - Περουσία (Greek), Perudža (Latvian), 佩鲁贾 (Chinese)
(Belgium) Péruwelz	Piérwé (Picard*), Péruwelz (French*), Perwé-e-Hinnot (Walloon*), Petrosa (Latin*)
(Russia) Petrozavodsk	Petrosawodsk (German), Petroskoi (Finnish, Karelian), Petrozavodsk - Петрозаводск (Russian), Petrozavodskas (Lithuanian), Pietrazavodzk - Петразаводзк (Belarusian), Petrozavodsk (Azeri), Äänislinna (former Finnish), Pietrozawodzk (Polish), P'et'rozavodsk'i – პეტროზავოდსკი (Georgian*)
(Slovakia) Pezinok	Bazin (Hungarian*), Bazinium (Latin), Bösing (German*), Pezinok (Slovak*), Pezinok – Пезинок (Serbian*), Pezinoka (Latvian*), Pezinokas (Lithuanian*)
(Belgium) Philippeville	Flipveye (Walloon*), Flipeville (Picard*), La Vedette-Républicaine (archaic French*), Philipopolis (Latin), Philippeville (French*)
(Italy) Piacenza	Piacenza (Dutch, German, Italian), Pjaćenca (Serbian), Plaisance (French), Plasencia (Spanish), Placência (Portuguese), Piacenţa (Romanian), Placentia (Latin), Plakentía - Πλακεντία (Greek), P'iachentsa – პიაჩენცა (Georgian*), Pjačenca (Latvian)
(Romania) Piatra Neamț	Karácsonkő (Hungarian), Kreuzburg an der Bistritz (German), Piatra Neamț (Romanian)
(Slovakia) Piešťany	(Bad) Püschtin (German*), Piešťany (Slovak*), Pieštianai (Lithuanian*), Pieszczany (Polish*), Pistian (alternative German), Pistyan (alternative German), Pještjani (Latvian*), Pještjani – Пјештјани (Serbian*), Pöstyén (Hungarian*)
(Poland) Piła	Piła (Polish), Schneidemühl (German 1772-1945)
(Belarus) Pinsk	Pinsk - Пінск (Belarusian), Pinsk - Пинск (Bulgarian, Russian), Pinsk (Dutch, French, German), Pińsk (Polish), Pins'k - Пінськ (Ukrainian), פינסק (Yiddish),平斯克(Chinese)
(Poland) Piotrków Trybunalski	Piotrków Trybunalski (Polish), Petrikau (German), Petrikev - פּעטריקעװ (Yiddish), Petrokov (Russian)
(Slovenia) Piran	Piran (Croatian, German, Serbian, Slovene), Pirano (Italian), Pyrrhanum (Latin), Pirànon - Πιράνον (Greek)
(Sweden) Piteå	Bidám (Pite Sami), Bihtám (Lule Sami), Bihtán (Lule Sami alternate), Bisum (Pite Sami alternate), Biŧon (Northern Sami), Byöhđame (Ume Sami), Piitime (Finnish*), Piitin (Meänkieli), Pita (Latin*), Piteå (Swedish*), Piteo (Lithuanian*), Pitovia (Latin alternate*)
(Germany) Plauen	Plauen (Dutch, French, German, Polish), Plavno (Czech, old Slovak)
(Bulgaria) Pleven	Pleven (Bulgarian, French, Serbian), Plevna (French alternate, Romanian, Russian), Plevne (Turkish), Plevno (Czech), Plewen (German, Polish), პლევენი (Georgian)
(Bulgaria) Plovdiv	Filippopoli (old Italian), Philippopolis (Latin), Philipúpoli - Φιλιππούπολη (Greek), Plovdiv (Azeri, Bulgarian, Czech, Dutch, Finnish, Portuguese, Romanian, Serbian, Slovak), Plowdiw (German), Płowdiw (Polish), Pulpudeva (Thracian, former name), Evmolpias (Thracian), Trimontium (Latin, former name), Filibe (Turkish, former name), Paldin (Slavic, former name), პლოვდივი (Georgian)
(Romania) Ploieşti	Ploieashti (Aromanian), Ploesht - Плоещ (Bulgarian), Plorescht (old German), Ploésti - Πλοέστι (Greek), Ploesht - פלוישט (Hebrew), Ploeszti (Polish), Ploešti - Плоешти (Russian)
(United Kingdom) (England) Plymouth	Aberplym (Cornish), Pleimuiden (Dutch alternate), Plimuto (Esperanto), პლიმუთი (Georgian), Plimuta (Latvian), 普利茅斯 (Chinese)
(Czech Republic) Plzeň	Pilsen (Dutch, English, German, Italian, former Romanian), Pilzene (Latvian), Pilzno (Polish), Plzeň (Czech, Romanian, Slovak), P'lzeni – პლზენი (Georgian*)
(Montenegro) Podgorica	Podgairítse (Irish), Podgorica (Catalan, Finnish, French, German, Latvian, Portuguese, Polish, Slovak, Spanish), Podgoritsa / Podgoritza / Podgoriza (Portuguese variants)*, Podogoritsa - ポドゴリツァ (Japanese)*, Ribnica (former name), Titograd (former name), P'odgoritsa – პოდგორიცა (Georgian*)
(Slovakia) Podolínec	Podolin (Hungarian*), Podolínec (Slovak*), Podolīneca (Latvian*), Podoliniec (Polish*), Podolinjec (Serbo-Croatian*), Podoljinec – Подољинец (Serbian*) Pudlein (German*)
(Belarus) Polotsk	Połacak - Полацак (Belarusian, obsolete), Połack - Полацк (Belarusian), Polock (Czech), Połock (Polish), Polotsk - Полоцк (Russian), Poloţk (Romanian), Polotzk (German), Polocka (Latvian)
(Slovakia) Poltár	Poltar (Serbo-Croatian*), Poltar – Полтар (Serbian*), Poltár (Slovak*), Poltāra (Latvian*)
(Italy) Pompeii	Pompei (Italian, Azeri, Romanian, Turkish), Pompéi (French), Pompei - Помпеи (Russian), Pompeia (Catalan, Portuguese), Pompeii (Latin), Poimpé (Irish), Pompej (Maltese, Hungarian), Pompeji (Danish, Dutch, German, Slovene, Swedish, Hungarian), Pompeya (Spanish, Tagalog*), Pompeja (Latvian, Serbian), Pompeje (Czech, Polish, Slovak), Pompiía - Πομπηία (Greek), Pompeiji (Finnish), Pompėja (Lithuanian), Pompei/P'omp'ei - 폼페이 (Korean), Pompei - ポンペイ (Japanese)*
(Switzerland) Pontresina	Pontresina (French, German, Italian), Puntraschigna (Romansh)
(Belgium) Poperinge	Poperienge (West Flemish*, Zeelandic*), Poperinga (Latin), Poperinge (Dutch*, French*), Poperingė (Lithuanian), Poperinghe (alternative French*), Poperingue (alternative French*)
(Slovakia) Poprad	Deutschendorf (German*), Poprad (Slovak*), Poprád (Hungarian*), Poprada (Latvian*), Popradas (Lithuanian*)
(Croatia) Poreč	Parenzo (Italian), Poreč (Croatian, Serbian, Slovak, Slovene), Porech - Пореч (Russian)
(Finland) Pori	Björneborg (Swedish, Norwegian, Danish), Pori (Finnish, Portuguese, Romanian, Latvian), Arctopolis (Latin)
(Portugal) Porto	Burtuqāl (Arabic), Oporto (Irish, Italian, Spanish, English variant), Poreutu / P'orŭt'u - 포르투 (Korean)*, Portas (Lithuanian), Porto (Azeri, Czech, Dutch, Esperanto, Finnish, French, German, Maltese, Polish, Portuguese, Romanian, Serbian, Slovak, Turkish), Portó (Hungarian), Portus Cale (Latin), Portu (Latvian), P'ort'u – პორტუ (Georgian*), Poruto - ポルト (Japanese)*
(Italy) Porto Torres	Porto Torres (Italian), Pòlsthu Tòrra (Sassarese), Pòrtu Tòrres (Sardinian)
(Slovenia) Portorož	Portorose (Italian), Portorož (Serbian, Slovak, Slovene)
(Finland) Porvoo	Borgå (Swedish), Porvoo (Estonian, Finnish, Portuguese, Romanian), Borgoa (Latin)
(Germany) Potsdam	波茨坦 (Chinese), Podstupim (Lower Sorbian), Postupim (Czech, Slovak), Potsdam (Azeri, Dutch, French, German, Italian, Portuguese, Romanian, Swedish), Poczdam (Polish), Potsdama (Latvian), Potsdamas (Lithuanian), P'ot'sdami – პოტსდამი (Georgian*), 포츠담 (Korean), Potsudamu - ポツダム (Japanese)*
(Slovakia) Považská Bystrica	Povajska Bistritsa (Azerbaijani*), Považská Bystrica (Slovak*), Považská Bystrica – Повашка Бистрица (Serbian*), Powaska Bystrzyca (Polish*), Vágbeszterce (Hungarian*), Waagbistritz (German*)
(Poland) Poznań	Posnânia (Portuguese, rare)*, Poznań (Polish), Posen (Dutch, German), Posnania (Latin), Poyzn - פּױזן (Yiddish), Poznaņa (Latvian), Poznanė (Lithuanian), Poznaň (Czech, Slovak), Poznan (Azeri, French, Portuguese, Romanian, Serbian, Turkish), Poznań - Познань (Belarusian, Ukrainian), P'oznani – პოზნანი (Georgian*), Pojeunan/P'ojŭnan - 포즈난 (Korean), Pozunani - ポズナニ (Japanese)*, 波兹南 (Chinese)
(Czech Republic) Prague	Birāġ - براغ (Arabic), Peuraha / P'ŭraha - 프라하 (Korean)*, Praach (Frisian), Praag (Afrikaans, Dutch, Limburgish), Prag (Bosnian, Croatian, Danish, German, Luxembourgish, Serbian, Swedish, Turkish, Icelandic), پراگ (Persian), Prâg (Welsh), Prág (Irish), Pràg (Scottish Gaelic), Praga (Latin, Basque, Catalan, Italian, Kashubian, Maltese, Polish, Portuguese, Romanian, Slovene, Spanish, Tagalog*), Prago (Esperanto), Prága - Πράγα (Greek), Prága (Hungarian), Prague (English, French, Norman), Praha (Belarusian, Czech, Estonian, Finnish, Ido, Indonesian, Nauruan, Norwegian, Slovak, Ukrainian, Lithuanian), Prāga (Latvian), Prog - פּראָג or Prag - פּראַג (Yiddish), Puraha - プラハ (Japanese)*, 布拉格 (Chinese), P'ragha – პრაღა (Georgian*), Praga - Прага (Bulgarian, Macedonian, Russian)
(Russia) Pravdinsk	Friedland (German), Frydland/Frydląd (Polish), Pravdinsk - Правдинск (Russian), Romuva (Lithuanian)
(Slovakia) Prešov	Eperiae (Latin*), Eperies (alternative German), Eperiesinum (alternative Latin), Eperjes (Hungarian*), Peryeshis (Romani), Preschau (German*), Preshov (Albanian*, Uzbek*), Prešov (Slovak*), Preşov (Azerbaijani*), Prešova (Latvian*), Prešovas (Lithuanian*), Preszów (Polish*), Pryashev - Прешов (Russian*), Pryašiv – Пря́шів (Ukrainian*), Pryašuv - Пряшів (Rusyn*)
(Slovakia) Prievidza	Prievidza (Slovak*), Prievidza – Прјевидза (Serbian*), Privigye (Hungarian*), Priwitz (German*), Prjevidza (Latvian*)
(Russia) Priozersk	Kexholm / Keksholm (Swedish, Norwegian), Käkisalmi (Finnish), Korela (old Russian), Priozersk (German, Russian)
(Kosovo) Pristina	Prishtinë (Albanian), Prishtina (English, traditional name), Priština - Приштина (Serbian, Russian), Priština - Прищина (Bulgarian), Prischtina (German), Priština (Czech, Slovak, Latvian, Lithuanian, Slovene), Priştina (Romanian), Pristine (Irish), Priştine (Turkish), Pristina (Catalan, French, Hungarian, Portuguese, Spanish), Pristino (Esperanto), Prístina - Πρίστινα (Greek), Prisztina (Polish), P'risht'ina – პრიშტინა (Georgian*)
(Kosovo) Prizren	Prisrend (English, traditional name), Prisren (German)
(Czech Republic) Přerov	Prerau (German*), Przerów (Polish)
(Czech Republic) Prostějov	Proßnitz in Mähren (German), Prościejów (Polish)
(Poland) Prudnik	Neustadt in Oberschlesien (German), Prudnik (Polish), Prudník (Czech), Прудник (Bulgarian, Ukrainian, Russian), Prudnjik - Прудњик (Serbian), פרודניק (Hebrew), Purudoniku - プルドニク (Japanese), პრუდნიკი (Georgian), Prudnikas (Lithuanian), Prudnicium (Latin), Prudņika (Latvian)
(Poland) Pruszcz Gdański	Pruszcz Gdański (Polish), Praust (German)
(Poland) Przemyśl	Peremisla (Romanian, old), Peremyshl' - Перемышль (Russian, traditional), Peremyshl' - Перемишль (Ukrainian, traditional), Pieramyšl - Перамышль (Belarusian), Premisl (Romanian), Premisl - פּרעמיסל (Yiddish), Přemyšl (Czech), Przemyśl (Polish), Pshemysl' - Пшемысль (Russian, modern official), Pshemysl' - Пшемисль (Ukrainian, modern official)
(Russia) Pskov	Bskūf – بسكوف (Arabic*), Opskova (local Estonian),^{[KNAB]} Peskov (alternative Spanish), Pihkeva (local Estonian),^{[KNAB]} Pihkova (local Estonian,^{[KNAB]} Finnish^{[KNAB]}), Pihkõva (local Estonian),^{[KNAB]} Pihkva (Estonian,^{[KNAB]} Võro^{[KNAB]}), Plescovia (Latin), Plescow (archaic English), Pleskau (German),^{[KNAB]} Pleskava (Latvian),^{[KNAB]} Pleskov – Плесковъ (archaic Czech, archaic Russian),^{[KNAB]} Pleskow (archaic English),^{[KNAB]} Pl'skov – Пльсковъ (archaic Russian),^{[KNAB]} Pscovia (Latin*), Pskoŭ – Пскоў (Belarusian*), Pskov (Azeri*, Czech*, Dutch, French, Romanian, Spanish*), Pskov – Псков (Bulgarian*, Russian*,^{[KNAB]} Ukrainian*), Pskov – פּסקאָװ (Yiddish), Pskov – Պսկով (Armenian*), Pskof Πσκοφ (Greek*), P'skov – Пьсковъ (archaic Russian),^{[KNAB]} Pskovas (Lithuanian*),^{[KNAB]} Psķovi – ფსკოვი (Georgian*),^{[KNAB]} Pskow (Upper Sorbian*), Psków (Polish),^{[KNAB]} Pszkov (Hungarian*), Pǔsīkēfū – 普斯科夫 (Mandarin Chinese*), Pusukofu – プスコフ (Japanese*), Vopski liin (local Estonian)^{[KNAB]}
(Slovakia) Púchov	Puchau (German*), Púchov (Slovak*), Púchov – Пухов (Serbian*), Pūhova (Latvian*), Pūchovas (Lithuanian*), Puhó (Hungarian*), Puxov (Azerbaijani*)
(Poland) Puck	Puck (Polish), Pùck (Kashubian), Putzig (German)
(Croatia) Pula	Pola (Italian, Romanian, French, German, Dutch), Póla (Hungarian), Polei (older German), Pula (Croatian, Czech, Finnish, German, Portuguese, Serbian, Slovak), Pulj (Slovene), Poła (Venetian), Puola (Istriot), Pòlis - Πόλις (Greek)
(Poland) Puławy	Pilev - פּילעװ (Yiddish), Puławy (Polish) Pilev (English, Spanish), Pullno (German)
(Poland) Pyrzyce	Pyrzyce (Polish), Pyritz (German)
