= Plovdiv Central railway station =

Railway station in Plovdiv, Bulgaria

Plovdiv Central Централна гара Пловдив
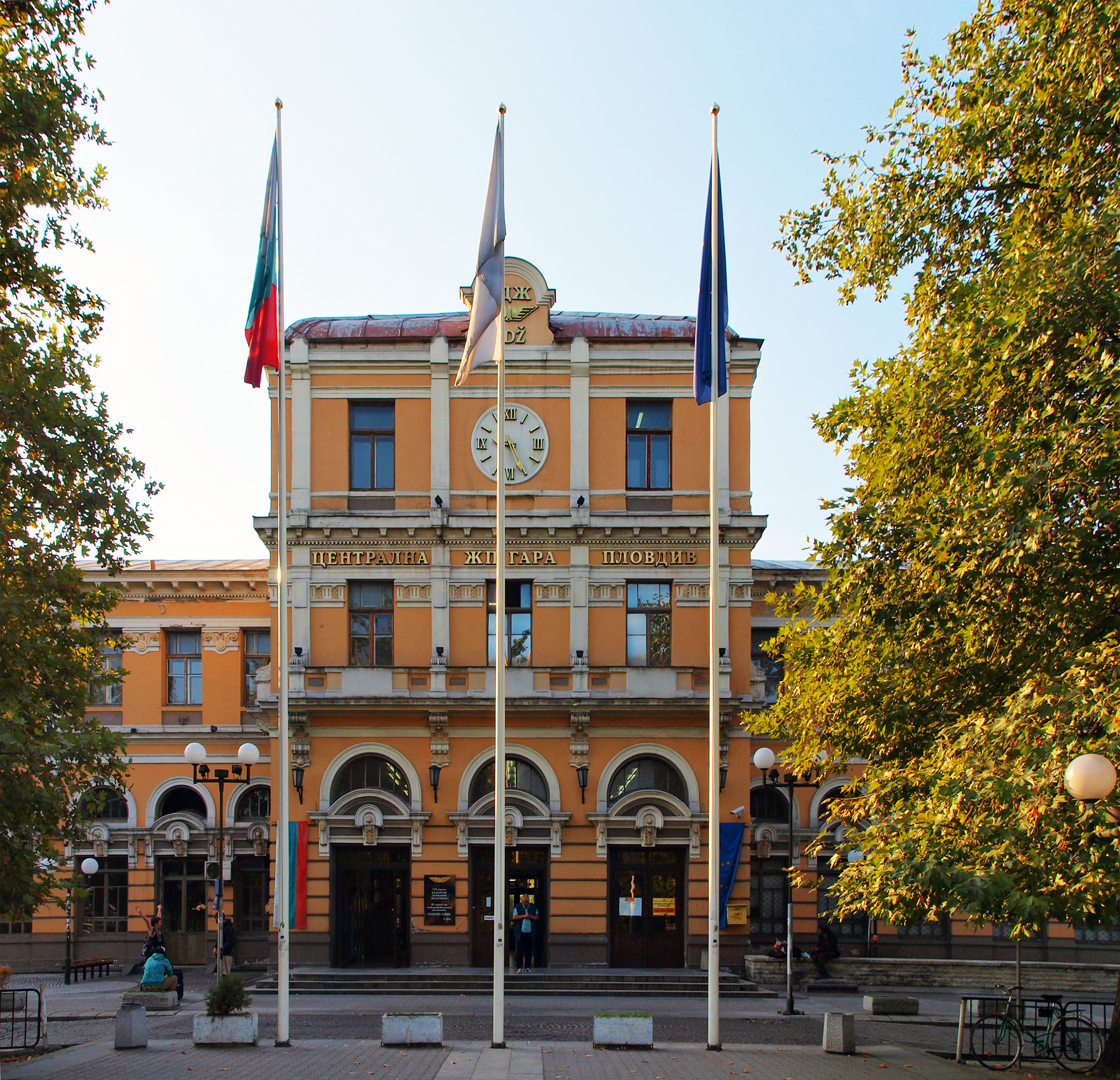
- Façade of the station building (2011)

General information
- Location: Blvd. Hristo Botev; Plovdiv; Bulgaria
- Coordinates: 42°8′4″N 24°44′29″E
- Owner: NRIC
- Operator: Bulgarian Railways
- Lines: Sofia – Svilengrad Granitsa; Plovdiv – Burgas; Plovdiv – Karlovo; Plovdiv - Asenovgrad; Plovdiv – Panagyurishte
- Platforms: 7
- Tracks: 11

Construction
- Structure type: At-grade
- Platform levels: 1
- Parking: Yes
- Cycle facilities: Yes

History
- Opened: 1870s
- Electrified: 1963

Services
Planned 2024 Plovdiv Light Rail Tramway
Location
- Location within Bulgaria

Plovdiv Central Railway Station (Bulgarian: Централна железопътна гара Пловдив, romanized: Tsentralna zhelezopatna gara Plovdiv) is the main railway station serving the city and municipality of Plovdiv, the second most populous city in Bulgaria.

== History ==
Opened in the 1870s, the station is located on the Lyubimets–Belovo railway, which links Sofia, capital of Bulgaria, with Istanbul, largest city of Turkey. It was built by Turkish architect Mimar Kemaleddin Bey.

There are 11 tracks in the station. The current Art Nouveau building, designed by the Italian architect professor Mariano Pernigoni, was completed in 1908.

== Gallery ==
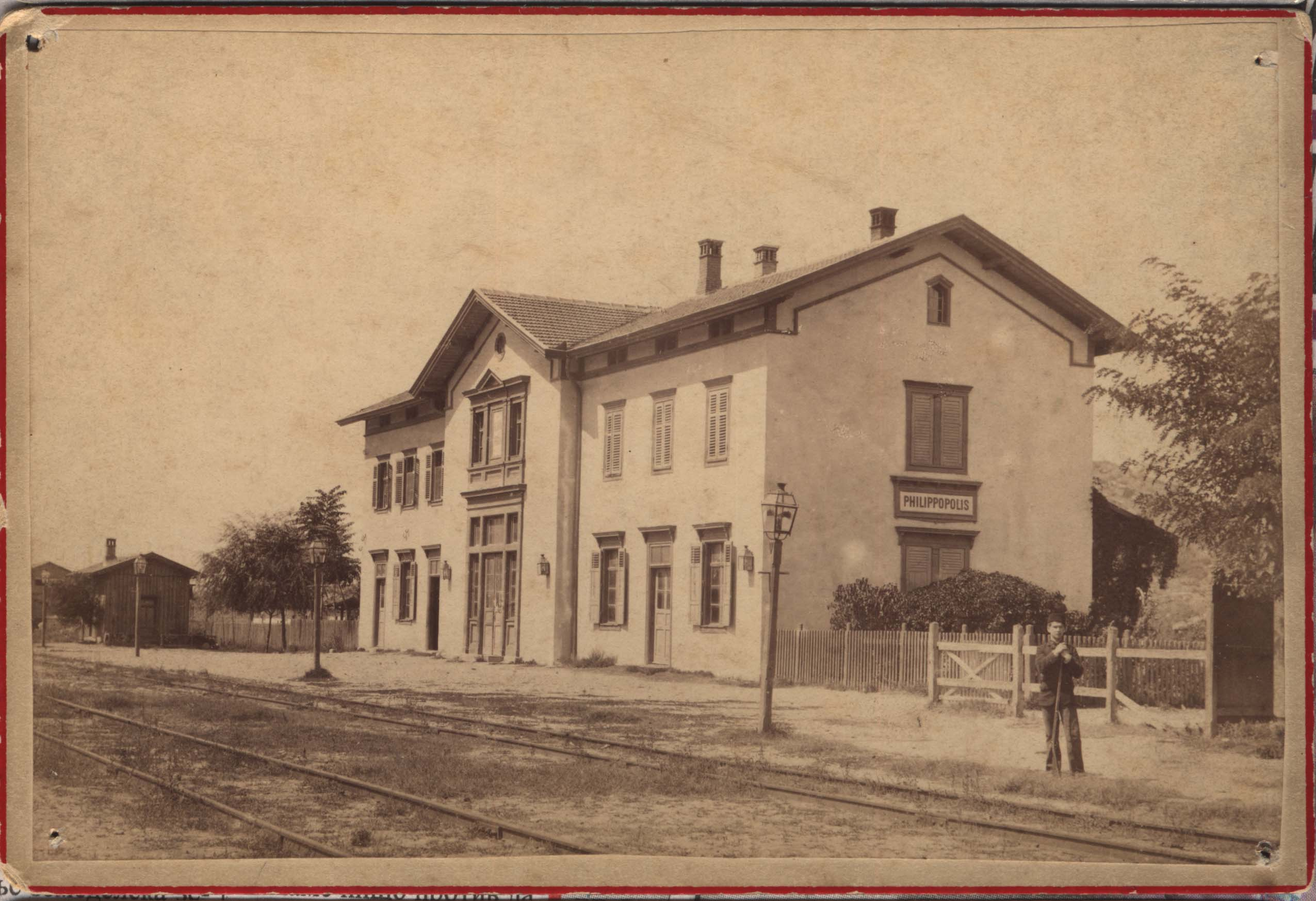
Original station, c. 1880

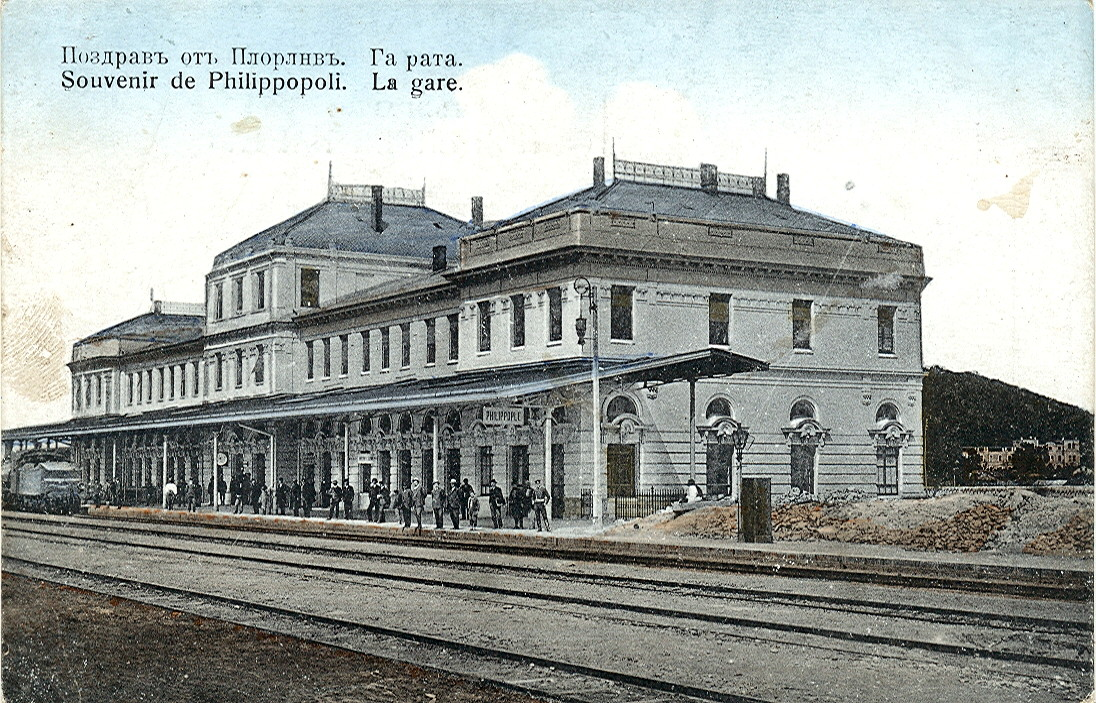
The station building, c. 1916

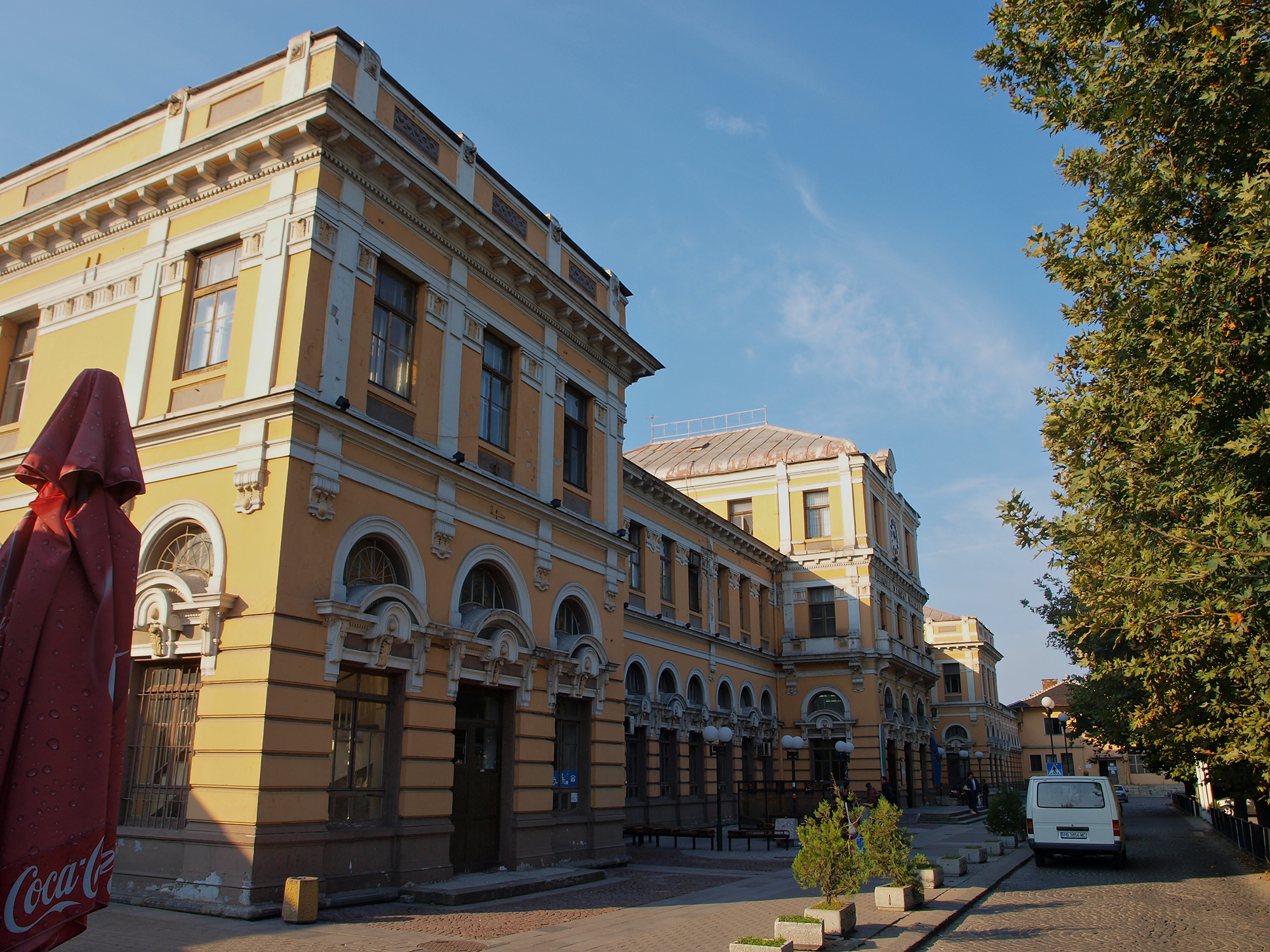
Main facade

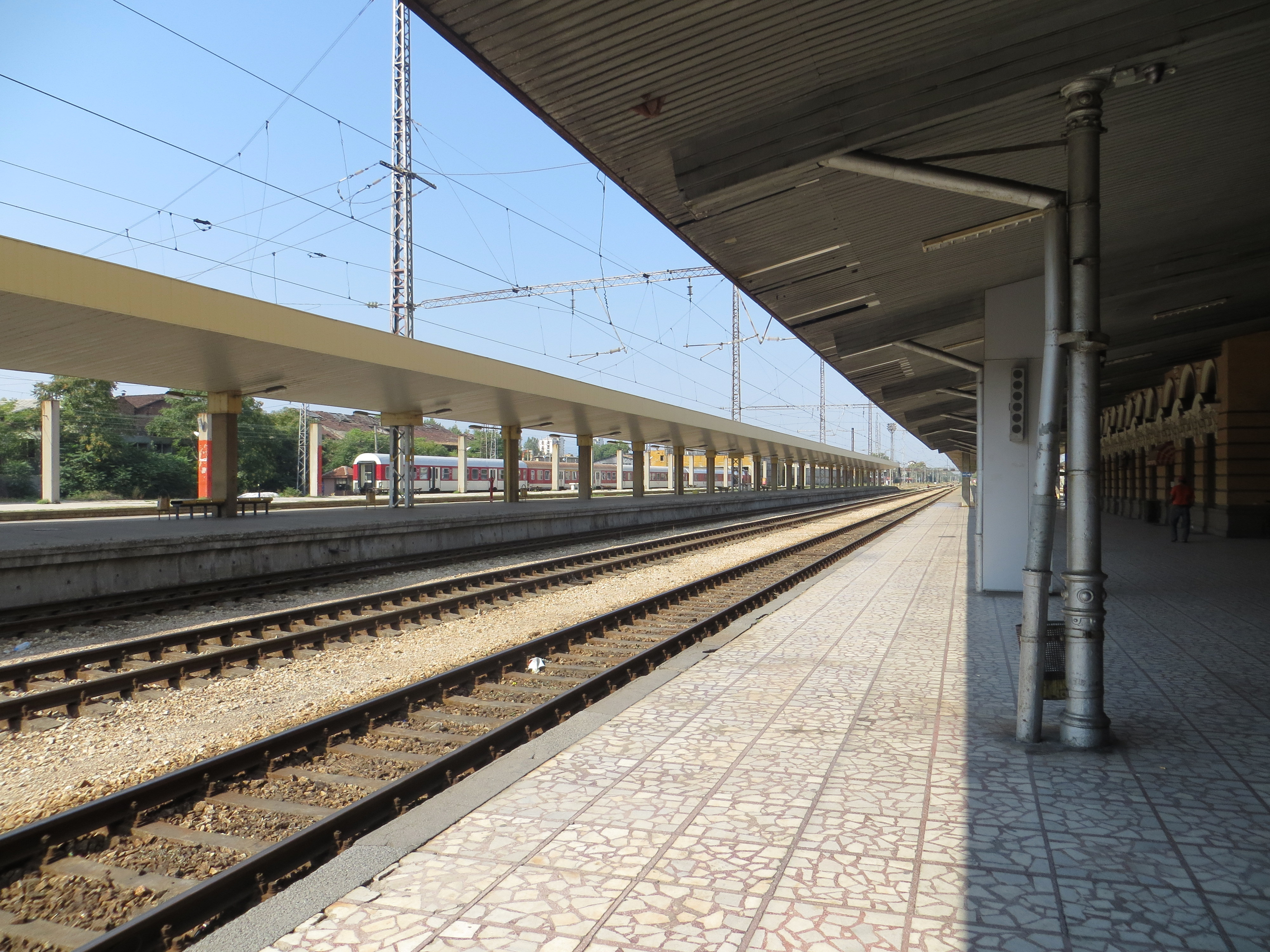
Station platforms today

== See also ==
- Bulgarian State Railways
