= 2020–2021 Bulgarian protests =

Anti-government protests

- Protests against the Third Borisov Government
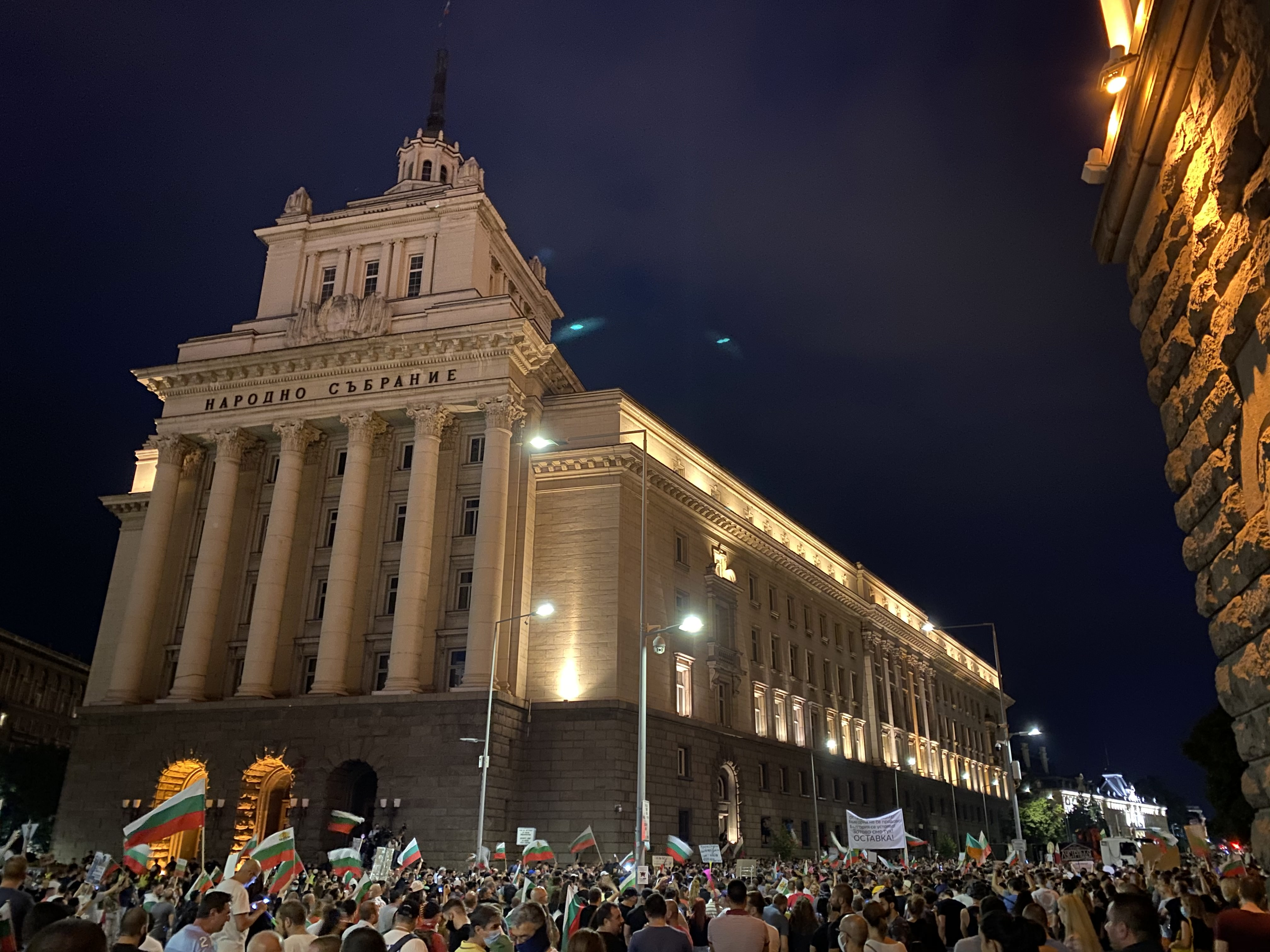
- Date: 9 July 2020 – 1 November 2021 (282 days)
- Location: Bulgaria: Sofia – main protest site; Burgas, Plovdiv, Varna, Blagoevgrad, Veliko Tarnovo, Gabrovo, Kyustendil, Lovech, Vratsa, Haskovo, Pazardzhik, Ruse, Silistra, Sliven, Smolyan, Yambol, Karlovo, Stara Zagora, Bankya; Abroad – London, Oxford, Exeter, Manchester, Birmingham, Brighton, Berlin, Cologne, Nuremberg, Munich, Frankfurt, Mannheim, Hamburg, Münster, The Hague, Amsterdam, Brussels, Luxembourg, Copenhagen, Paris, Lyon, Marseille, Milan, Vienna, Prague, Warsaw, Istanbul, Ankara, Barcelona, Madrid, Chicago, New York, Boston, Washington, Montreal, Toronto, Ottawa, Melbourne, Sydney, Auckland, Stockholm, Helsinki, Oslo and others
- Caused by: Prosecutor's Office raiding the Presidency of Bulgaria; Government mishandling of the COVID-19 pandemic; Ahmed Dogan and Delyan Peevski being guarded by the National Service for Protection; Political corruption and misuse of EU funds; State capture; Lack of media freedom and transparency; Lack of adequate environmental protection; Systemic electoral fraud
- Goals: Resignation of Prime Minister Boyko Borisov and the Bulgarian government (until April 4, 2021); Court trial and imprisonment of Boyko Borisov; Resignation of Chief Prosecutor Ivan Geshev; Resignation of BNT Director General Emil Koshlukov; Resignation of Mayor of Sofia Yordanka Fandakova; Early parliamentary elections; Constitutional amendment
- Methods: Demonstrations; Sit-ins; Occupations; Photobombing; Online activism; Picketing; Road blocks and barricades; Motorcades; Hunger strikes; Riots (on 2 September)
- Status: Ended: A no-confidence motion brought in by the Socialist Party is defeated in the National Assembly (21 July); The Constitutional Court of Bulgaria unanimously rules that Chief Prosecutor Geshev is not allowed to investigate the incumbent President (30 July); Police forces storm and dismantle the road blocks and tent camps across the country (7 August); Most road blocks reestablished by demonstrators (10 August); Six NSS agents disciplined for their actions on the Rosenets beach (10 August); Minister for Justice and Central Electoral Commission Chairwoman resign (26–27 August); Bulgarian political crisis (2021–2026)
- Concessions: Head of National Service for Protection resigned (10 July); Resignation of 3 government ministers offered, later withdrawn (Offered 15 July, withdrawn 16 July); Government reshuffle (23 July); Government announces 2 billion lev stimulus package (27 July); The GERB faction in Burgas city council votes a resolution to renationalize the street leading to Rosenets beach (27 July); The government announces a second social package (12 August); Limited constitutional amendment proposed by the government (14 August)

Parties
| President of Bulgaria Anti-government demonstrators Anti-government; Political Parties: Bulgarian Socialist Party (in Parliament); Ataka (in Parliament, since August 2020); Communist Party of Bulgaria (in Parliament); Stand Up.BG; Democratic Bulgaria; There Is Such a People; Revival; ABV; Bulgaria for Citizens Movement; Bulgarian Left Republicans for Bulgaria (GERB defectors); Labour Unions and Institutions: Confederation of Independent Trade Unions; Autonomous Workers' Confederation; Bulgarian Judges Association; Bulgarian Industrial Capital Association; Bulgarian Academy of Sciences; Groups & NGOs: The Poisonous Trio; Save Sofia; BOEC; Civic Platform Stand Up.BG; Justice for Everyone Initiative; The System Kills Us | Government of Bulgaria GERB (Ruling party, coalition leader) Pro-Government; Political Parties: VMRO (in Parliament); NFSB (in Parliament); Volya (in Parliament); SDS; Ataka (until August 2020); DPS (own course after September 2020); Organizations: KRIB |

Lead figures
| No officially designated leaders, endorsed by the following public figures: Rumen Radev (President of Bulgaria); Hristo Ivanov; Maya Manolova; Tatyana Doncheva; Reneta Indzhova; Slavi Trifonov; Kostadin Kostadinov; Vasil Bozhkov; The Poisonous Trio: Arman Babikyan; Nikolay Hadjigenov; Velislav Minekov Tsvetan Tsvetanov (Republicans for Bulgaria chairman) | Boyko Borisov (Prime Minister, GERB leader); Yordanka Fandakova (Mayor of Sofia); Ivan Geshev (General Prosecutor); Emil Koshlukov (BNT Director General); Kiril Domuschiev (KRIB chairman) Support by public figures: Rosen Plevneliev; Georgi Gergov Mustafa Karadaya (DPS chairman); Ahmed Dogan (Honorary DPS chairman); Delyan Peevski |

Number
| 150,000 protesters in Sofia; Tens of thousands concurrent outside of Sofia; 400,000 nationwide total; Thousands outside of Bulgaria | |

Casualties
- Deaths: 0
- Injuries: More than 200
- Arrested: Hundreds

A series of protests were held from 2020 to 2021 in Bulgaria, mainly in the capital Sofia, as well as cities with a large Bulgarian diaspora, such as Brussels, Paris, Madrid, Barcelona, Berlin and London. The protests, sometimes called "Revolution of Dignity", were the culmination of long-standing grievances against endemic corruption and state capture, particularly associated with prime minister Boyko Borisov's governments, in power since 2009.

Spontaneous demonstrations were triggered by the 9 July 2020 raid on the Presidency of Bulgaria by police and prosecutors in what was perceived as an attack against President Rumen Radev, a vocal critic of Borisov's rule.

Borisov has refused to resign, insisting that the "mafia wants to overthrow him" and that "no alternatives" to his rule have been presented. His ministers, deputies and parliamentary allies have labelled protesters "scum", "apes" and a "herd" which must be "put back in its place".

The protests ended on 16 April 2021, as the 4-year term of Borisov's cabinet has ended, and the formal resignation of the 3rd Borisov government has been accepted by the new parliament.

== Background ==
=== Corruption ===
Bulgarian Prime Minister Boyko Borisov and his populist GERB party have been in power since 2009, with a two-year interruption in 2013, when his government lost power following similar protests. Borisov's cabinets have seen persistent corruption in all branches of government; a 2017 assessment of the United States Department of State described the presence of selective justice and a lack of judicial independence. The report stated that Bulgarian government officials were engaging in bribery, procurement violations and embezzlement with impunity. Bulgaria has consistently ranked as the most corrupt European Union member in the Corruption Perceptions Index, and has remained last in 2019, ranking 74th globally. As a result of corruption and oligarchic rule, Foreign direct investment collapsed from 28% of GDP in 2008 to a largely remittance-based 2% of GDP in 2018.

Corruption has been described as "endemic", especially in large infrastructure and energy projects, and within public procurement with taxpayer and EU funds. A report by the Centre for the Study of Democracy, a Bulgarian think-tank, found that local businesses perceive at least 35% of public tender contracts to involve corruption. Many of the public tender contracts are awarded to a handful of large companies amid widespread irregularities, procedure violations and tailor-made award criteria. Furthermore, infrastructure projects are often poorly made on purpose in order to extract continuing maintenance contracts for the companies involved. In an infamous case, a poorly renovated road led to a bus crash near Svoge in 2018, resulting in 20 deaths. In 2019 alone, the Borisov government signed public procurement deals worth 16.4 billion leva ($9.93 billion) largely for infrastructural projects, more than three times the government budget for the nation's "collapsing" healthcare system.

In the 2018-2020 period, Borisov and his ministers have also been involved in a series of corruption scandals: guesthouses built with EU funds have been used as private villas for government officials; millions in agricultural subsidies have been diverted to livestock existing only on paper; and Borisov himself was implicated in a possible money laundering scheme investigated by police in Catalonia.

This has been complemented by a steep decline in media freedom. Bulgaria dropped from 59th to 111th globally in the Press Freedom Index between 2008 and 2019, the lowest score of any EU member or candidate state; Reporters Without Borders reported worsening harassment of journalists and continuing government control over the media through financial means, including EU funding. The organisation expressed particular concern over the Borisov government's candidate for Chief Prosecutor, Ivan Geshev, who had made scathing remarks about media which were "not to his liking". Geshev also opposed the concept of separation of powers, calling it "a far-right idea". Former US ambassador to Bulgaria, James Pardew, said in 2019 that a "political environment with little government or criminal accountability and no serious opposition to challenge the current government" is in place in Bulgaria. Pardew further named Delyan Peevski as a "media kingpin" with a virtual monopoly on private media in Bulgaria, controlling as much as 80% of the local market.

=== Institutional war ===
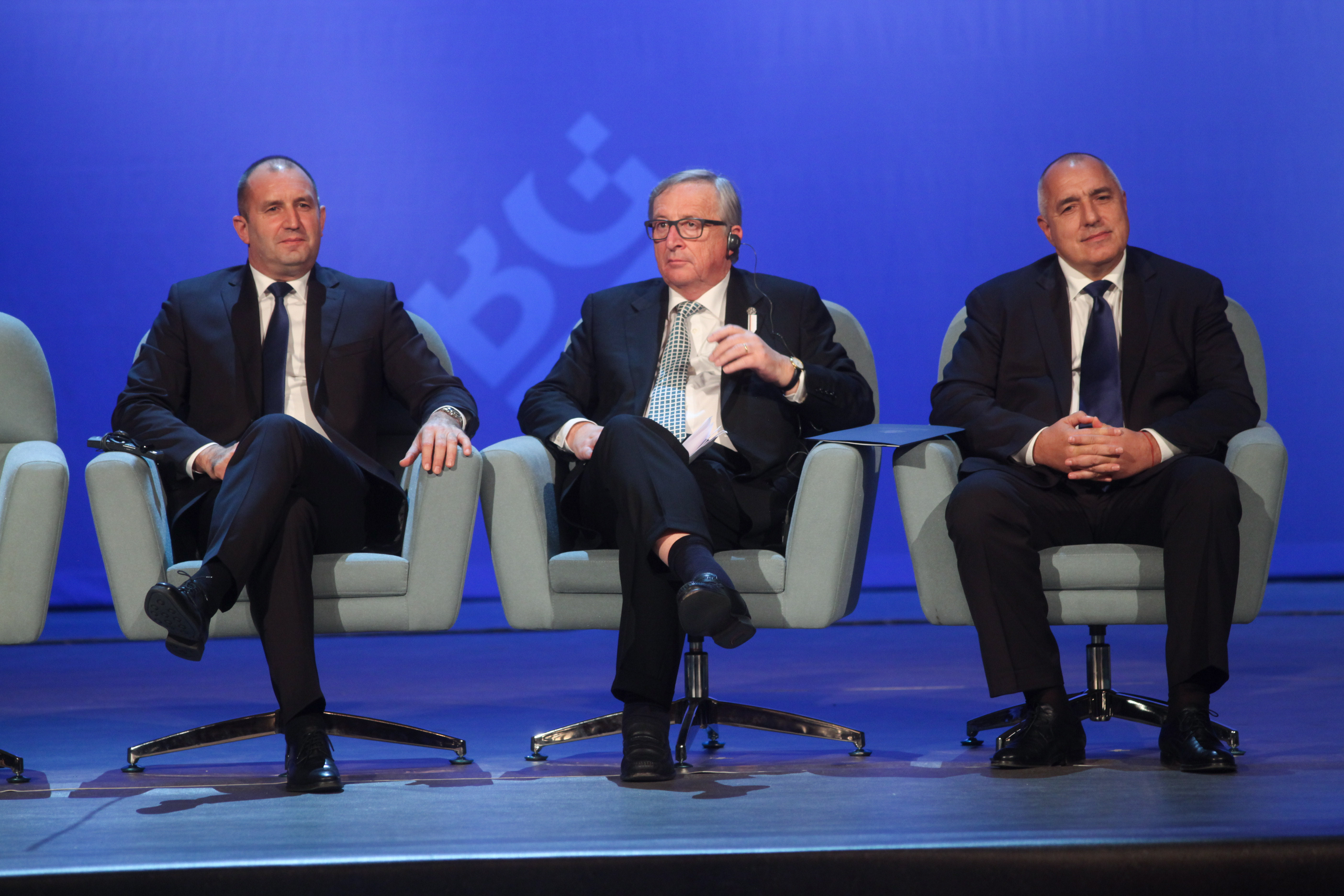
President Rumen Radev (left) and Prime Minister Boyko Borisov (right). The two Bulgarian leaders often publicly clash.

Following the defeat of GERB's candidate for president in the 2016 Bulgarian presidential election, Bulgarian Air Force general Rumen Radev was elected to the mostly ceremonial post of President of Bulgaria. Radev, an independent, was nonetheless backed by the Bulgarian Socialist Party – Bulgaria's largest opposition party. Radev frequently criticised the prime minister over what he alleged was corruption, mismanagement and authoritarianism inherent in Borisov's rule. Consequently, Radev frequently vetoed legislative proposals by GERB and vocally opposed Borisov's government. In turn, Borisov accused Radev of sabotaging the government's work, dividing the nation and compromising his independence in favour of the opposition. Bulgaria's parliamentarist constitution holds the Prime Minister responsible to the National Assembly instead of the President and allows for the parliament to overrule presidential vetoes via a simple majority. As such, Borisov was able to maintain power in the country despite the president's objections and criticisms, as the latter lacked any legal mechanism to sack or seriously obstruct the government.

This inter-institutional conflict escalated significantly in late 2019, as the President attempted to block the appointment of Ivan Geshev to the post of Chief Prosecutor. Radev cited Geshev's nomination by the Supreme Judicial Council, a procedure where Geshev was the sole candidate. However, the Supreme Judicial Council constitutionally forced President to accept Geshev as Chief Prosecutor, which Radev reluctantly did after noting that further refusals could amount to a violation of the constitution. The newly appointed Chief Prosecutor released what he described as wiretaps of the president shortly thereafter, which allegedly implicated him in criminal activities. Radev, who was at this point criticising Borisov over the government's response to the COVID-19 pandemic in the country, strongly rejected the allegations and accused the Prime Minister of having the nation's security service illegally spy on him and fabricate evidence.

== Cause of protests ==
=== Alleged photographs and voice recordings of the Prime Minister ===
Shortly before the start of the protests, photographs emerged that purported to show what appeared to be Prime Minister Borisov laying half-naked on a bed, next to a nightstand featuring a handgun and stacks of 500 euro banknotes. Borisov confirmed that the room in which the photos were taken was his, but denied the gun and money, stating that the images could have been manipulated. Borisov accused President Radev of flying a consumer drone into his residence in order to take the picture. He also accused former Ombudswoman Maya Manolova, TV star Slavi Trifonov and his own former second in command Tsvetan Tsvetanov (who had just left and condemned the ruling party) of involvement in a plot to take photos of him while he was sleeping, in a "KGB-Style" kompromat operation. Radev condemned the leaks and called it an "insane" invasion of the prime minister's privacy. He added that he owns a drone, but that the accusation that he personally piloted it into the prime minister's residence to take pictures was part of Borisov's "fantasy and paranoia".

Around that time controversial voice recordings were leaked on the Internet. The voice in the recordings, which strongly resembles the voice of the Prime Minister Borisov, insults fellow GERB member and chairman of the National Assembly Tsveta Karayancheva and European leaders. On 24 July, socialist MEP Elena Yoncheva stated that American experts had allegedly proven the authenticity of the recording. EU Parliament head David Sassoli stated that Yoncheva had pledged to provide the findings to Belgian police.

=== Scandal with National Security Service guards ===
One of the events that provoked a strong public reaction was an action of activists of Yes, Bulgaria!, broadcast live on social media. The activists, led by Hristo Ivanov, reached a coastal beach in front of the residence of Bulgarian oligarch Ahmed Dogan, located near the port of Rosenets in Burgas by boat. Their purpose was to check whether the regime of exclusive state ownership of the surrounding beach is actually observed and whether as such it is accessible to Bulgarian citizens. There they were intercepted by security guards, which pushed them out, insisted that the beach was privately owned and called the police, which assisted them. The activists subsequently called on the president and the prime minister to identify whether the anonymous security guards were National Security Service (NSS) employees. The NSS is a government-funded bodyguard and security service that is only mandated to protect state leaders, which Ahmed Dogan is not. Party representatives also called on the prosecutor's office to launch an investigation against Ahmed Dogan for violating the constitution and state property law.

In an address to the nation the following day, President Radev revealed that the guards were, in fact, employees of the National Security Service. Borisov called on the leadership of the NSS to cease protection duties of Ahmed Dogan and Delyan Peevski, who is also under protection by the Service. Radev followed with a similar call several hours later. In this situation, GERB and the United Patriots introduced amendments to the Law on NGOs, according to which the appointment of security guards by the service would become the responsibility of the head of the service.

=== "Eight Dwarfs" extortion scandal ===
In early July, the name of the General Prosecutor became mixed up in the corruption scandal "Eight Dwarfs", which erupted at the same time. The "Eight Dwarfs" scandal was named after a downtown Sofia restaurant in which alleged extortion deals took place. The scandal related to senior magistrates, with whom the American ambassador to the country was personally acquainted. Prosecution magistrates were accused by an owner of an elevator company of extorting him to give up his shares in the company to them, threatening him that they would leave his sick son without lifesaving hemodialysis should he refuse. The magistrates were also alleged to have met there to discuss plans to steal 35 kilograms of gold from another businessman.

=== Incursion of the public prosecutors into the presidency ===
Shortly thereafter, representatives of the prosecution and Capitol Police investigators entered the presidency, carrying out search and seizure operations. They arrested two officials from the presidential administration. The first arrestee was Plamen Uzunov, advisor on legal issues and anti-corruption, accused of Influence peddling. The second – Iliya Milushev, a presidential advisor on security issues, accused of crimes involving disclosure of state secrets and conspiracy to illegally obtain secret documents. Another employee of the state reconnaissance agency with the initials M.K. was also arrested. According to the prosecution's statement Milushev voluntarily handed over four documents, which had been taken illegally from the State Intelligence Agency. According to the Agency, the documents contained information constituting a state secret. At the same time a prominent businessman Plamen Bobokov was also arrested for alleged Influence peddling.

General Prosecutor Ivan Geshev told the media his indifference to the incident on the beach, where it was revealed that the national flag had been trampled.

Eventually, the culmination of all these scandals provoked a spontaneous protest in front of the presidency.

== Timeline ==
=== July ===
==== 9 July – Protests begin ====
The protests began on 9 July 2020. They set as their goal the removal of Borisov's cabinet and the resignation of Chief Prosecutor Ivan Geshev. They are encouraged by President Rumen Radev, who has called for the expulsion of the Bulgarian mafia from the executive and the judiciary, as well as EU member states to express a position on the situation in the country, which is growing into a constitutional crisis. However, the prime minister and the chief prosecutor refused to resign. The prosecutors' board and members of the government oppose the resignation of the chief prosecutor and the prime minister.

==== 10 July – The President's address; Borisov calls for counter-protests ====
Thousands of protesters blocked the center of the capital for the second night in a row. At 5:27 pm the Head of the National Security Service, Gen. Krasimir Stanchev resigned. This came hours after he was asked to do so by President Rumen Radev after a series of scandals in which the service was involved in guarding the summer residence of honorary DPS leader Ahmed Dogan. Earlier, Stanchev's resignation had been demanded by Democratic Bulgaria.

About an hour and a half after the protests began President Rumen Radev told protesters in front of the presidency that "the protest against the mafia is turning into a campaign and there is no force to stop us." Radev called on the protesters not to be divided into left and right, Russophiles and Russophobes, Americanophiles and Americanophobes, Europhiles and Europhobes, Bulgarians and Turks, and not to repeat the mistakes of the 2013 protests. He ended his speech with the call "Mafia – out".

With calls to defend "Bulgaria's legitimately elected government", GERB party members urged party supporters to take part in a counter-protest in front of the Council of Ministers. At 7 pm, the counter-protest in front of the Council of Ministers of GERB members in support of the government began. The Chairperson of the National Assembly of Bulgaria Tsveta Karayancheva, the Minister of Labor and Social Policy Denitsa Sacheva and GERB MPs Toma Bikov and Alexander Nenkov came to the square in front of the Council of Ministers building. "No one has the right to insult us, the voters of GERB, by calling us mafiots." said Chairperson of the National Assembly of Bulgaria Tsveta Karayancheva. At 8 pm, Prime Minister Boyko Borisov also appeared before the counter-protesters. He commented on the government's success in joining ERM II starting Bulgaria's path to the Eurozone. Borisov was greeted with applause. A few minutes later, he returned to the building, along with all the government ministers. After Prime Minister Borissov's speech, GERB supporters began to disperse, while there was a significant crowd of police around the protesters on the side of the presidency. Protesters against the government blocked traffic on Tsar Osvoboditel Blvd. between Orlov Most and Sofia University. Another group separated and tried to wait and block the buses with GERB supporters. The police then took measures to separate the two groups.

==== 11 July ====
Bulgarian President Rumen Radev addressed the nation in a television speech broadcast across the country, in which he endorsed the protests and called for the resignations of both Chief Prosecutor Geshev and the entire Bulgarian government. Bulgarian police arrested 18 people amid clashes in an otherwise peaceful protest.

==== 12 July ====
Bulgarian emigrants living in London joined the protests and gathered peacefully outside the Bulgarian embassy in the United Kingdom, expressing their grievances to Bulgaria's ambassador to the country.

==== 14 July – Prosecution announces wiretaps of opposition MP ====
Thousands of protesters blocked traffic in downtown Sofia as a small group of pro-government counter-demonstrators, whom the protesters accused of being bussed in by the government, were placed just 50 meters across from the main demonstrators by police. Several groups of anti-government activists reportedly organized raids against the pro-government buses.

The National Representation of Student Councils in Bulgaria accused pro-government police forces of illegally beating protesting students and demanded the resignations of police officers found responsible.

Chief Prosecutor Geshev released a series of wiretaps that he stated were collected by the State Agency for National Security. He alleged that the tapes proved that Aleksandar Paunov, Communist Party of Bulgaria leader and opposition MP, held a conversation with Vasil Bozhkov, a Bulgarian exile wanted by the prosecution. He further accused President Radev of "supporting fugitives from justice". Paunov confirmed that he had a conversation with Bozhkov, but denied any wrongdoing. Nevertheless, he left the socialist parliamentary group to avoid associating it with Bozhkov and discrediting the protests, continuing his mandate as an independent politician. The Union of Democratic Forces called on the prosecution to ban the communist party entirely, stating that it had supported the protests and "contributed to the destabilization of the country". They also expressed a desire to see all communist parties in the country banned.

==== 15 July ====
A very large protest took place in the centre of Sofia, with turnout so big, that the demonstration stretched across several of the city's largest boulevards. The protests were peaceful throughout the day, but tensions escalated after 22:30 as young men attempted to break into the parliament's office building and threw fireworks, bottles, stones and red paint at the police, resulting in six arrests.

The opposition socialist party introduced a motion of no confidence against Borisov's government in parliament, accusing it of collaborating with the Bulgarian mafia. Meanwhile, President Radev called for further peaceful protests, but cautioned participants to avoid provocations that could be used to 'sow discord' among the protesters.

Borisov issued his first concession to the protesters by asking his ministers for finance, the economy and the interior to resign after police violence was documented during the protests. Nevertheless, the ruling party excluded the possibility of early elections. The majority of protesters rejected these concessions and vowed to keep protesting until the entire government resigns.

==== 16 July – Refusal of Resignation ====
Both Chief Prosecutor Geshev and Prime Minister Borisov made statements refusing to hand in their resignations and vowing to remain in power until the final day of their term. That same day, the Confederation of Independent Trade Unions of Bulgaria, Bulgaria's largest labour union, officially endorsed the protests.

President Radev once again addressed the nation, rejecting the government's concessions and stating that no cabinet reshuffle could save the current government.

The protest on 16 July was stated to be the largest thus far, as the demonstrations spread to Bulgaria's smaller towns. The protest movement also saw demonstrations outside of the country, as student organizations and immigrant communities organized solidarity protests in London, Manchester, Berlin, Cologne, The Hague, Brussels, Copenhagen and other cities.

Prime Minister Borisov once again rejected calls for early elections, stating that his resignation would "break the country". Political analysts writing for New Europe stated that the government could expect to survive the no-confidence motion tabled for the following week, as the coalition government MPs had enough votes to reject the motion and keep the government in power at least until the next scheduled election in 2021. He also announced that he was withdrawing his previous concession of demanding the resignations of three of his ministers – stating that neither he, nor his ministers would resign.

The protests continued late into the night. After several smoke bombs were thrown into the square, the protestors formed a human chain to prevent provocateurs from committing violent acts. The policemen guarding the demonstrators removed their riot shields in gratitude to the protesters.

==== 17 July ====
Protesters gathered for the ninth day in a row to protest against the government. In addition to the usual protest sites, rallies were also held in Lovech, Kyustendil, Vratsa and Haskovo. Besides the protest at the city centre, protesters also gathered in front of the building of the Bulgarian National Television and demanded the resignation of its Director General, Emil Koshlukov.

National Assembly Chairwoman and leading GERB figure Tsveta Karayancheva made a statement in which she stated that holding early elections would be pointless, as she opined GERB would simply win again and form another government. She added that her party could not trust Radev in the formation of a caretaker government, as the previous such government in Bulgaria's recent history "sent shivers down her spine". She also accused President Radev of intentionally dividing Bulgarian society.

==== 18 July ====
At the end of the tenth day rally, protest leaders called on Bulgarians to begin civil disobedience and "besiege" all buildings belonging to the government (specifically mentioning the National Assembly), as well as those buildings belonging to state or municipal institutions, at 7 am on Monday, 20 July. This coincided with the parliamentary session in which the assembly was due to vote on the motion of no confidence brought by the socialists, which was expected to fail as pro-government MPs retained a majority in the chamber.

==== 19 July ====
The daily protests were joined by the first foreign rally in Nuremberg, organized by a 25 year old lawyer and Bulgarian expatriate in Germany. The Bulgarian National Radio noted that anti-Borisov protests had also begun occurring in Berlin, Paris and Barcelona, having been organized by communities of Bulgarian emigrants.

==== 20 July – Blocking of the metro system; Attempted dissolution of "Revival" ====
Protesters blocked the National Assembly building and also briefly blocked the city's metro system as the parliamentary debate around the opposition's no-confidence motion began in the assembly.

Sofia's Prosecution authority stated that it was seeking to ban and dissolve Vazrazhdane, an extra-parliamentary party that had strongly supported the protests. The prosecution alleged that it had found "invalid data" among the party's documents, concluding that the party had been formed illegally. The party's leader stated that he was not surprised and believed that the DANS had been working on a "political order" to incriminate Vazrazhdane on false evidence for months by that point.

The three ministers whose resignation Borisov had offered to the protesters earlier in the week all confirmed that they would not be resigning and would continue serving in their current positions. IMRO leader and Minister of Defence Krasimir Karakachanov stated that he expected no major upcoming changes in the government's composition. Police forces began to look for ways to limit protesters' access to the city centre, as some protesters brought up the idea of not only surrounding the national assembly, but also occupying it. Though Bulgaria's Interior Ministry has refused to publish data on the amount of protesters, Balkan Insight stated that estimates suggested that at least 50,000 people were protesting concurrently each night by that point. Separately, police forces detained a former parliamentarian, accusing him of aiding the protesters in briefly blocking the metro system earlier that day alongside two accomplices.

Socialist leader Korneliya Ninova accused the government of attempting to ban a traditional annual meeting at Buzludzha that marks the anniversary of the party's founding in 1891. She further accused mayors and functionaries belonging to the ruling party of allegedly threatening transport companies by telling them that they would never again receive government contracts if they agree to transport any socialists or their supporters to the meeting. Ninova stated that due to what she described as "the dictatorship's" attempt to ban the Buzludzha rally, the socialist party would instead hold its rally on the "yellow pavement" in Sofia's city centre. Shortly thereafter, the government's health minister denied that he wanted to ban the meeting and announced that the socialists would be allowed to hold their rally in Buzludzha.

==== 21 July – Failure of no confidence motion ====
The Socialists' motion of no confidence in the nation's parliament ended in defeat as it gained the support of 102 MPs, while 121 MPs of the ruling coalition voted against. Protesters reacted negatively, chanting "Resign" and "Jail", whilst vowing to continue their demonstrations until both Borisov and the Chief Prosecutor resign.

A group of protesters attempted to besiege PM Borisov in Sofia Airport as he arrived from meetings with the European Union with the intention of not allowing him to leave until he agreed to resign. Their attempt failed, as the Prime Minister had already left the airport by the time they arrived.

Revival leader Kostadin Kostadinov complained of what he dubbed "brutal political repression", stating that members of his party were summoned to police interrogations after the prosecution announced its intention to have the party dissolved the previous day.

==== 22 July – "Yes, Bulgaria!" appeals to the Government ====
Hristo Ivanov, the leader of Yes, Bulgaria! (part of the Democratic Bulgaria coalition) announced that he had petitioned not only the supreme judicial council, but also PM Borisov to order his justice minister to fire Chief Prosecutor Geshev – making him the first leader of an opposition party to negotiate with the government. He stated that he was "engaging" Borisov in front of the whole nation to order the justice minister to dismiss Geshev as a first step toward constitutional changes that he would like to propose in Bulgaria.

Two weeks after the protests began, protesters again rallied in Sofia's city centre, blocking seven major boulevards, as well as several bus and tram lines for several hours. Demonstrators threw flat caps at the Palace of Justice (referencing the Chief Prosecutor, who is known for wearing such caps) and toilet paper at the Council of Ministers building. The protesters chanted their refusal to accept minor concessions and insisted on the resignation of the entire government as well as the chief prosecutor. Protests also took place in cities and towns across Bulgaria, with smaller anti-government rallies being held for the first time in Sliven, Pazardzhik, Ruse and Yambol.

A major Bulgarian news outlet revealed that Chief Prosecutor Geshev had gone into paid vacation since 20 July. The prosecution's press office stated that he had taken a vacation in order to "work on the strategic priorities of the prosecution", adding that Geshev "worked best when he was resting".

The prosecution authority announced that it had brought charges against another former parliamentarian and current advisor in the field of energy policy to President Radev. It accused him of complicity in the brief blocking of Sofia's metro system three days prior. The other former parliamentarian arrested a couple of days prior was also charged with the same indictment.

==== 23 July – Government reshuffle ====
Having faced increasing pressure from street protests, the ruling coalition (GERB, IMRO – Bulgarian National Movement and the National Front for the Salvation of Bulgaria) decided to replace four government ministers. The ministers for tourism and the economy were replaced by their deputies, the minister of the interior was replaced by a high-ranking police officer, while the minister of healthcare switched positions to become minister of finance, his former post to be taken up by the head of a Sofia hospital.

The opposition parties rejected the replacements as an "imitation of change" and a "joke", continuing their calls for the resignation of the entire government and early elections.

The protesters were not satisfied with the cabinet reshuffle and anti-government protests spread across Bulgaria's major cities.

President Radev addressed the demonstrators, accusing the government of being "deaf" to protesters' demands and once again insisting on the resignations of the entire government and the chief prosecutor. He called for further protests, opining that the protest movement would be the 'beginning of the end' of the "corrupt model [of governance]" and expressed his support for early parliamentary elections and changes to Bulgaria's constitution.

==== 24 July – BNT interview incident ====
Bulgaria's Chief prosecution authority demanded that Hristo Ivanov apologise for "misleading the prime minister" in his 22 July appeal to Borisov, in which he asked for the Chief Prosecutor's dismissal. It alleges that he made false statements in his report, thus defaming the chief prosecutor.

A large truck that was supposed to provide technical and audio equipment for the daily protest in Sofia was stopped by Bulgarian police outside the city. One of the protest's organizers stated that the truck was stopped and had its registration plates removed by police officers that offered no explanation for their actions, thus rendering the vehicle unroadworthy and unable to enter the city. The traffic police department stated that officers had stopped the 12-tonne truck during a "routine check" and discovered four different road law violations, issuing three fines. It stated that the truck was hence banned from Bulgaria's roads for the time being. Nevertheless, after the police left, the truck was driven into the city without any license plates. It arrived at the protest site at around 20:00.

The protesters took to blocking the capital's roads, blocking ten of the city's largest crossroads and demanding the resignations of the government, chief prosecutor, BNT's director general and the Mayor of Sofia. The resulting traffic jam led to a road rage incident in which an angry car driver rammed his car through the protesters in an attempt to pierce the road block. This resulted in a 19-year-old female demonstrator receiving minor injuries, though nobody was seriously hurt. In response, some protesting groups threatened to blockade the country's highways.

A video recording emerged of a group of demonstrators co-organized by Yes, Bulgaria! and the "FIGHTER" association spilling trash bins onto the street and throwing beer bottles in an attempt to occupy the Bulgarian National Television building, where a debate was held between GERB's Parliamentary chief Daniela Daritkova and socialist leader Korneliya Ninova. The group had apparently refused to take part in the general protests and besieged the TV headquarters, leading to police intervention. Ninova later stated that the protesters had allowed her to leave by foot, whereas Daritkova was held longer until freed by police. Police authorities stated that both Daritkova and Ninova had refused police protection, while the crowd began to throw bottles and cans when it saw figures emerging from the building, necessitating a police response. They stated that Ninova left by foot, while Daritkova was blocked by protesters in her car, leading the police to break up the protest in order to allow her to leave. It was later revealed that the refusal of the two representatives to accept police protection violated police protocols, causing Ninova to issue a public apology to the police officers involved.

The town of Karlovo saw its first protest as anti-government demonstrations became more commonplace outside of Sofia.

==== 25 July – Socialist Rally ====
By noon, protesters had blocked the Ruse-Varna and Ruse-Kubrat intercity roads, accusing the government of abandoning the roadside infrastructure and expressing a lack of faith in the country's institutions. In an attempt to avoid road rage incidents, demonstrators took to giving apology fliers to every car stuck in traffic near the protest site.

The Socialist Party defied the government by holding their annual anniversary demonstration in the centre of Sofia instead of on mount Buzludzha. Around 10,000 socialists arrived from across the country to the capital, where they paraded through the city and demanded the government's resignation. At the rally socialist leader Korneliya Ninova alleged that the government had attempted to bribe key socialist politicians in order to "break the left" during the protests, but stated that the plot had failed as the socialists had refused to "sell themselves".

The daily evening protest in Sofia was mostly cut short by a major thunderstorm, though some demonstrators stayed and threw tomatoes at government buildings. Protest organizers cautioned demonstrators to avoid hitting policemen with the tomatoes and instead only target the buildings. Separately, residents of the Manastirski Livadi neighbourhood marched to the residence of the Mayor of Sofia and GERB member Yordanka Fandakova and demanded her resignation after she allegedly privatized a plot of land that was supposed to be earmarked for a municipal kindergarten.

Demonstrators in Varna took to briefly blocking the city's major intersections, while in Ruse protesters covered the ruling party's local headquarters in protest slogans. 50 members of a "citizens' committee" also declared that they would be launching a hunger strike in protest against the government.

==== 26 July ====
Bulgarian expatriates in the Australian city of Melbourne organized a rally in support of the protest movement and demanded the government's resignation. Smaller rallies were also organized in various cities in the United States, while the London protests had become a daily occurrence for two weeks in a row.

==== 27 July – Government announces new concessions ====
Protesters announced that they would be holding a nationwide general strike on 29 July. The nation's trade unions announced support for the movement, but stated that they would not be officially joining the strike, as only 20% of the unions' leaders had announced a readiness to go on strike. Demonstrators also organized a mock "wish-writing contest" in front of the Bulgarian National Bank, as the date marked Bulgarian oligarch Delyan Peevski's birthday.

After a meeting with the ruling coalition, PM Borisov publicly announced a 2 billion lev stimulus package, slated to be transferred to retirees, the unemployed, paramedics and business leaders in an attempt to placate the protesters.

By evening, the government announced another concession – the GERB majority in Burgas' city council agreed to vote in favour of an opposition-sponsored resolution and void the April city council decision to privatize the public road that leads to the coastline and DPS Chairman Ahmed Dogan's mansion at Rosenets and sell it to a company linked to Dogan. The lack of public access to the coastline was one of the reasons that contributed to the start of the protests.

Despite both the government concessions and a rainstorm that had erupted over the capital, protests nevertheless continued. Most protesters rejected the government's "social package", calling it a "mockery" and asserting that the government's plan to give a one-time 50-lev (around US$30) pension boost to retired citizens would "neither help a retiree, nor give him a future". In response, several groups of protesters announced that they would be forming an "initiative committee" that would coordinate the various groups protesting against the government in a bid to further unify the protest movement. Meanwhile, anti-Borisov demonstrators in Germany took to a campaign of writing letters en masse to all the deputies of the German Bundestag. They hoped that they would be able to cut off support for Borisov by Germany by pressuring the ruling CDU/CSU, fellow EPP member and close ally to Borisov's party, to distance itself from him. In addition, the protesters took the decision to begin protesting in front of the CDU/CSU headquarters daily until their goal is reached.

Protesters in Sofia marched to the European Commission representation office in the country, demanding that the EU administration take note of the protests. Anti-government protests also erupted in many smaller towns across the country. During that day's protests, the result of an investigation into police brutality on 10 July were made public – revealing that at the investigation found that police had used "excessive force" and "violated the fundamental rights of the citizens" during the incident. In response undefined "disciplinary measures" were announced by the Ministry of the Interior.

==== 28 July ====
Representatives of the tourism industry and tour operator companies joined the protests in front of the Council of Ministers, demanding that the adoption a crisis plan to deal with the consequences of the COVID-19 pandemic that had decimated tourism in the country.

==== 29 July – New Audio Recording leak; Socialist Party leaves parliament ====
A scandalous audio recording once again leaked on the Internet. In the recording, which was likely made in the autumn of 2018, a voice, strongly resembling that of PM Borisov and a second, resembling that of Tomislav Donchev, discuss previous protests and President Radev, using very crude language. The voice resembling Borisov's states that "knowledge can only be given to a smart person, a dumb person can only take a dick", adding that dumb people are to be dealt with by "poisoning, fucking their mothers" and "giving them a dick". It then goes on to say that these "dumb people" are the ones in charge of the protest. It then mocks President Radev, calling him a "simple pilot" that is "one of many" and asserting that "the pilots of the civil aviation are a hundred times better pilots", concluding that the President should "fuck his own mother's pussy".

Meanwhile, protesters gathered earlier than usual across Sofia and blocked several key intersections in the city. An angry driver drove through a group of demonstrators that had set up a road block, which led to his car being surrounded and climbed on by protesters before a police intervention.

The Socialist Party's parliamentary faction yelled "Resign!" at government MPs and then demonstratively left the nation's parliament mid-session, after their demand to have the prime minister arrive at the assembly to answer questions was denied. The GERB-appointed Parliamentary Chairman ordered disciplinary punishments against the socialist MPs and motioned to have the session be continued without them.

The protests deepened, as protesters across the country poured in amid calls for nationwide protests. A large crowd gathered in central Sofia to protest against the government, drawing between 100,000 and 120,000 demonstrators, thus marking the largest anti-government gathering in Sofia so far. Democratic Bulgaria and Revival party members took out the flags of their political parties, which some protesters condemned and attempted to take down, resulting in a verbal altercation that ultimately led to a minor police intervention. In another incident, protesters threw bottles at Volya leader Veselin Mareshki at around 18:00 local time, after he stated before state television that the protests had been "corrupted by crazies". An hour later, the protests were joined by former Ombudswoman Maya Manolova. By 22:00, the citywide roadblocks increased in number to a total of 20, which in turn led to a number of altercations with angry drivers that were caught in traffic. Some of the protesters took the decision to set up tents as part of a more permanent sit-in, vowing not to leave the city's central square until the government resigns.

Protesters from Kazanlak and Stara Zagora organized a car-based protest with a few hundred vehicles, with which they blocked the highway between the two cities. Road blocks were also put up in the city Plovdiv, while near Ruse anti-government demonstrators blocked the border checkpoint at the Danube Bridge that marks the border between Bulgaria and neighbouring Romania.

==== 30 July – Supreme Court Ruling ====
Protesters set up tents and makeshift camps on key intersections, thus creating permanent roadblocks that blocked several of Sofia's major boulevards and forced over a dozen lines of the city's public transport system to be rerouted. To this end, groups of demonstrators heeded calls from protest organizers to "sleep under the windows of power". Police forces were mobilized and shortly thereafter and the Chief of Police announced that five intersections had been cleared of protests following "negotiations".

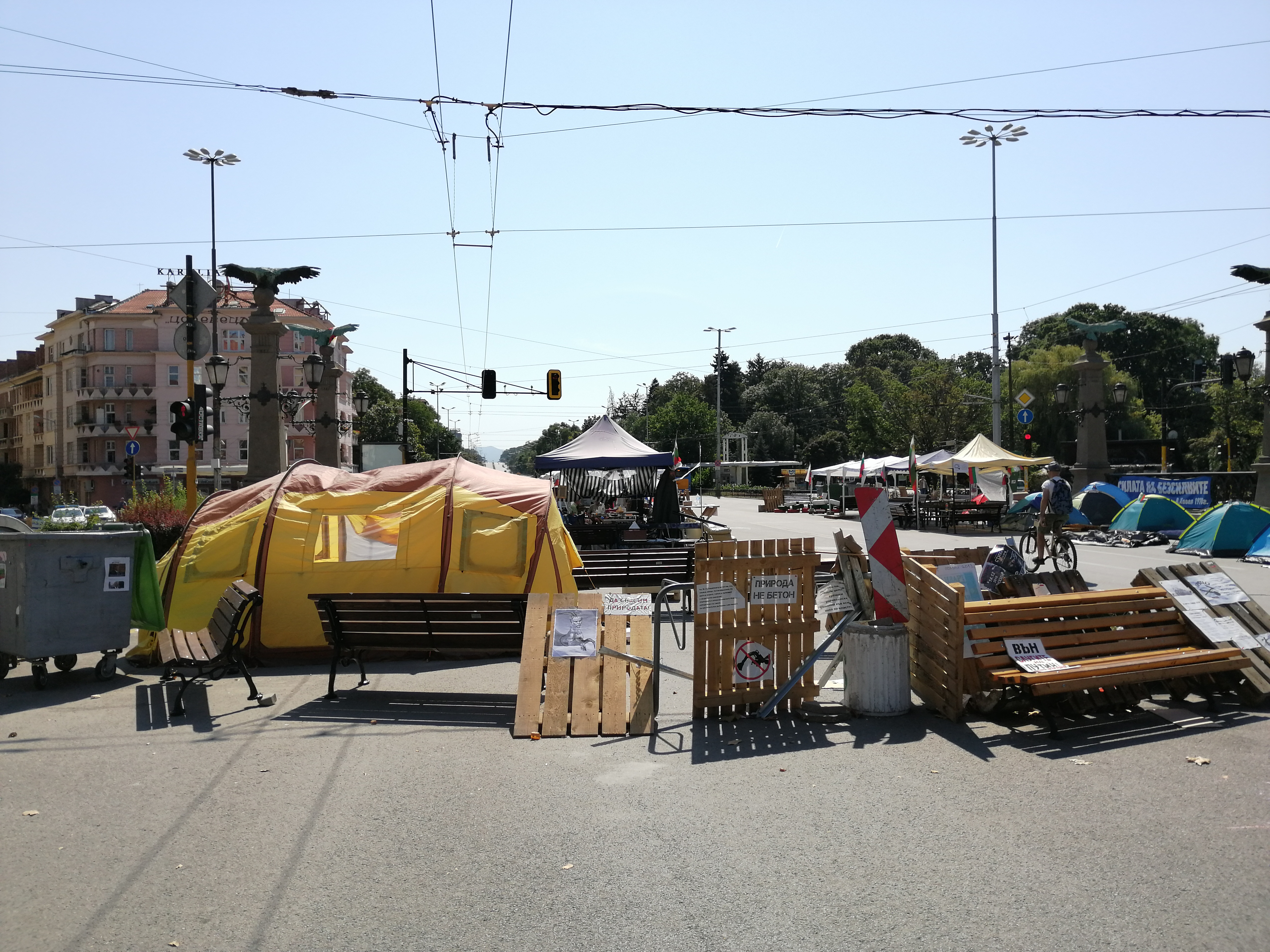
A protest tent camp

The Constitutional Court of Bulgaria unanimously ruled that Chief Prosecutor Ivan Geshev was not permitted under the nation's constitution to investigate, wiretap or indict the country's president due to the legal immunity the constitution provides him.

At evening, President Radev addressed the media. He commented on the audio leaks released the previous day and opined that they showed "a clear sign of who is behind the discreditation campaign waged against the presidential institution", adding that "in his panicked attempts to save himself, the prime minister is taking his party and all of his fellow partymen down with him". Radev concluded by once more asking for the resignations of both the government and chief prosecutor, declaring that "there was no other exit" out of the situation. He then stated that he was ready with a caretaker government to replace Borisov's cabinet, as he deemed the process [of the overthrow of the government] to have become irreversible.

Prime Minister Borisov expressed his disagreement via a video he uploaded to Facebook, in which he claimed that the "enemies of natural gas diversification" were the ones protesting.

The roadblocks became permanent as tent camps emerged on various boulevards to man the roadblocks overnight, merging with other protesters by day to march around the city and throw tomatoes and eggs at the Council of Ministers building.

==== 31 July – Parliamentary session ends; National Assembly moves ====
On the 23rd consecutive day of protests, the National Assembly officially ended its parliamentary session and went into recess until September. The government declared that there would be no extraordinary sessions called during summer, despite a veto enacted by President Radev against a law that had recently been passed that would nominally require the parliament to reconsider the law no more than 15 days after the veto. The government coalition stated that it would not count the days during recess for the purpose of the 15-day reconsideration requirement.

Unexpectedly, the government also issued an announcement delivered by the Minister for the Environment alongside Valeri Simeonov, the leader of NFSB – one of Borisov's coalition partners. The government announced that following the recess, the national assembly would move to a new building – a brand new extension it had built to the former headquarters of the now-defunct Bulgarian Communist Party. The new wing of the building was equipped with special sound insulation to prevent assemblymen from hearing noises from the protest, separated the press area from the assembly floor to prevent journalists from having direct access to the parliamentarians and provided auxiliary exits from the building to MPs.

The Deputy Chief of Police announced that the roadblocks in Sofia were illegal and would be removed by police. He stated that police forces hoped to convince the protesters to take them down through closed-door negotiations, adding that the police would "raise its tone", as he opined that the current situation represented a "gross violation of public order".

One of the protest organizers alleged that he was "seriously offered money (a lot of money)" to "pack up his stall and leave", which he stated he rejected outright.

As protests continued, demonstrators from Stara Zagora attempted to leave the city and block the Trakia motorway, but had their vehicles blocked by police cars, while a group of Gendarmes arrived ready to disperse the demonstrators. The latter decided to leave their cars behind and walk to the motorway on foot, but were stopped by the Gendarmes present. Protesters appealed to the policemen, but the gendarmes stood their ground and did not permit them to pass.

=== August ===
==== 1 August ====
The System Kills Us organization, an association of parents and legal guardians caring for children with disabilities joined the protest movement and demanded the government's resignation. The organization organized a march on PM Borisov's home in Bankya and later attempted to drive a van into Sofia's central square. The van was blocked from reaching its destination by police forces near Sofia University's rectorate building. System Kills Us' spokesperson stated that they would keep their protest routes a secret, as they feared retaliation from the ruling party's youth wing, alleging that the youth wing had threatened to lay nails and broken glass on the road in order to pop the tyres of their vehicles, so that they wouldn't "disturb the prime minister". The government's Social Affairs Minister reacted by dubbing their protest a "political provocation".

==== 2 August ====
Protesters in Sofia set up a "citizens' parliament" and collected signatures in a formal petition for the government's resignation. Meanwhile, demonstrators near Kresna briefly blocked the international route E79 motorway, but quickly faced a government response as dozens of policemen and gendarmes arrived at the roadblock and forced it to be dismantled.

Under the slogan "You are not alone" Bulgarians living abroad gathered in 22 cities across Europe, the US and Canada to support the protests and demand Borisov's resignation. Anti-government protests were for the first time reported to have occurred in Oxford, Exeter, Mannheim, Oslo and Stockholm.

==== 3 August ====
A road block tent camp was established on the Stara Zagora-Haskovo road by anti-government demonstrators, which insisted that the police stop preventing them from blocking the Trakia motorway. Stara Zagora mayor Zhivko Todorov, himself a GERB member, arrived at the road block and attempted to convince the protesters to abandon their attempts. The protesters refused and instead began demanding for his resignation as well.

A road block was also established by demonstrators in front of Varna's municipal hall, while in Sofia the number of permanent tent camps had grown to three. One of the participants in the concurrent hunger strike announced that he had also been refusing water for several days, triggering concerns that he could die due to dehydration.

==== 5 August – Ruling party conference ====
Amid the continuing daily protests, PM Borisov held a national conference of the ruling GERB party. The conference was open to MPs, ministers, district governors, mayors and municipal councillors belonging to the ruling party, as well as representatives of its coalition partners – the IMRO – Bulgarian National Movement, the National Front for the Salvation of Bulgaria and the Union of Democratic Forces (SDS). Surprisingly, Borisov announced that he was ready to resign "at any time", but that in such an event he desired the ruling coalition to continue governing without him, thus avoiding the prospect of having to call elections.

Anti-government protesters arrived on the scene of the conference and attempted to block the ruling coalition's representatives from leaving the premises. Tensions rose as protesters refused to leave and demanded the resignations of the entire coalition. Police forces then massed around the protesters and pushed them out of the way, thus clearing a path for the coalition's representatives to leave. In another incident, a group of conference participants, some wearing badges showing affiliation to the ruling party, assaulted a Radio Free Europe journalist and broke her phone. The journalist stated that she had previously seen them assaulting a group of anti-government demonstrators and wanted to ask them questions, upon which she was insulted by the group, then assaulted herself. Media footage emerged of an elderly GERB leader than approaching the scene of the incident and defending the group, calling the journalist "trash" and telling her that "her presence was not welcome".

GERB distanced themselves from that day's events, stating that the "members and sympathizers of GERB were peaceful throughout the entire time" and that "paid provocateurs had pierced the security cordon and assaulted GERB members, citizens and journalists".

The 58-year-old hunger striker that had refused water was hospitalized after his health condition seriously worsened. Other anti-government protesters had managed to convince him to at least begin drinking water and call emergency medical services. He was taken by ambulance to a local hospital, where doctors stated that he was in critical condition.

==== 6 August – Ruling coalition refuses calls to resign ====
The government held a closed-door council with its coalition partners to decide on whether or not to resign. The result were two public statements – the first delivered in an interview before Bulgarian television by prominent GERB politician Tomislav Donchev, in which he stated that the government could potentially resign in September, following the passage of "important laws" in the nation's parliament. The second, contradicting statement was delivered later that day by Valeri Simeonov, leader of the NFSB party and coalition partner of Borisov. Simeonov stated that neither the government, nor Borisov would be resigning at any point, claiming that "there were no alternatives" and adding that the governing coalition would "not bow down to pressure from the street and evade [their] responsibility [to govern]".

Following Simeonov's statement, protesting crowds marched to the joint headquarters of the NFSB and SDS in Sofia, pelting it with eggs and tomatoes, which in turn led to a fistfight between a protester and young man present at the headquarters.

The opposition Socialist Party formally filed a motion for a new, extraordinary session of the National Assembly to be opened, demanding that the PM Borisov and his Interior Minister answer questions relating to the previous day's violent incidents during the ruling party's conference, as well as a review of the recently revised national budget. The country's constitution provides for their motion to be accepted so long as at it is backed by least a fifth of the national assembly's elected representatives.

==== 7 August – Police dismantles road blocks ====
In a press briefing in Sofia, the national police forces declared that they would no longer tolerate the presence of roadblocks and tent camps in the country. For this reason, at around 4:00 local time police and gendarmes undertook a major operation to storm all such protest installations in Sofia. Security forces massed on all road blocks and tent camps and demanded that participants leave, following which they attempted to take physical control of the sites. According to the national police, physical force was only used against one anti-government demonstrator, while another 12 were arrested for resisting the police operation. The van belonging to The System Kills Us, which had also refused to move, was seized by the police and impounded, while its owner was fined. By mid day, security forces had managed to successfully overwhelm demonstrators and dismantle all road blocks and tent camps in the city, restoring the normal flow of traffic.

Similar police operations took place in Varna and Stara Zagora, where similar road blocks were dismantled by government forces. Two protesters in Varna were also arrested for attempting to resist the police. Analogous raids then took place in Plovdiv, where 60 demonstrators were fined by police for "violating public order".

NFSB leader Valery Simeonov stated before national television that the barricades had been dismantled in order to "avoid a small civil war in the country", while protest leaders vowed to respond by erecting more and larger road blocks all across the country.

The Confederation of Employers and Industrialists of Bulgaria (KRIB), a national chamber of commerce, expressed their enthusiasm for the police operation by writing a personal letter to PM Borisov, thanking him for his "fast reaction". KRIB claimed responsibility for triggering the police operation, stating that they had sent letters to the government three days prior in which they demanded for the police forces to dismantle demonstrators' barricades. KRIB also insisted that the government issue an order to restrict demonstrations to predefined 'suitable' locations only.

By evening, demonstrators gathered around and began rebuilding the tent camps and barricades. Some protesters set up tents on Eagles' Bridge in the capital, while others built barricades on the streets out of park benches, trash containers and other objects. One of the demonstrators was arrested by the police, which accused him of carrying a bat. This led to a group of demonstrators to form a human chain around the police van into which he was placed in an attempt to block the van from escorting him out, though this failed as police forces managed to push their way through. In the city of Plovdiv, demonstrators were blocked from marching and setting up new barricades through a thickened police cordon that blocked the crowd.

==== 8 August – Entrenchment of the barricades; Protesters issue demands to Dogan ====
In the early night hours of the day, demonstrators at the Eagles' Bridge barricades entrenched themselves and stood off against Gendarmes that had been sent to confront them. The protesters manned their makeshift defences as they were approached by gendarme vans. Having noted the protesters' intention to resist, the gendarmes withdrew without attempting to dismantle the barricades. Shortly thereafter, more barricades were built around the capital on various boulevards, as well as in front of Sofia University.

After dawn, anti-government demonstrators took to going to the Rosenets beach near Honorary DPS leader Ahmed Dogan's residence in what they dubbed a "Dogan Saray Beach Festival". The beach was the location where the confrontation with the NSS guards in early July had turned into one of the causes for the eruption of the protest movement. The participants in the rally were allowed to enter the beach unobstructed, whereupon they built a tall flagpole where they raised the national flag. Surprisingly, Dogan himself appeared out of his residence and approached the demonstrators, asking to speak with them. The protesters then calmly issued him their demands – most notably a full withdrawal of Dogan's support for both Borisov and Geshev. Dogan responded by nodding and saying "yes" to each demand, following which he wished the protesters good luck, waved at the crowd and returned to his residence.

President Radev then issued a statement in which he opined that the political crisis in the country could only be solved by Borisov and Geshev's resignations, as he stated that "repressions against the opposition cannot possibly restore faith in the government".

==== 9 August ====
By evening PM Borisov made an announcement before the media that he had ordered police forces not to dismantle the barricades by force. Shortly beforehand, a group of demonstrators had organized a vehicle convoy, which blocked the Kalotina border checkpoint between Bulgaria and Serbia, causing kilometres-long traffic jams. The group was pulled over by police forces four times, with law enforcement claiming that the group was creating "conditions for car crashes", while the demonstrators claimed that they had not and instead had been illegally harassed by the police. The group lifted their road block voluntarily an hour later.

==== 10 August – Hristo Ivanov scandal; NSS staff disciplined ====
Demonstrators voluntarily dismantled their own barricades in front of Sofia University's rectorate building, stating that they did not wish to inconvenience the residents of the capital any further and would instead join with the tent camps in front of the Council of Ministers building, where they expected to pressure the prime minister into resigning. On the other hand, protesters in Varna re-established the tent camp that had previously been dismantled by police forces in front of the city's town hall. The police briefly attempted to stop the demonstrators from re-establishing the camp, but retreated following a short clash.

The nation's National Security Service, which came under intense criticism during the Rosenets beach incident that contributed to the start of the protest movement, concluded their review of their agents actions during the incident on the Rosenets beach. The NSS stated that their personnel did not act in accordance with their own professional obligations. In the subsequent disciplinary measures, two of the agency's members were fired for disciplinary reasons, two were put on demotion notice and two were verbally chastised.

The protest movement was rocked by a scandal, as Democratic Bulgaria leader Hristo Ivanov was shown on video to be approached by another man, whom he appeared to know, later recognized as Dimitar Lambovski – a former NDSV parliamentarian with links to the SIC criminal organization. Lambovski approached Ivanov, asking that the two discuss something to do with another figure from the Bulgarian underworld. Ivanov motioned for Lambovski to stop speaking and told him that the conversation should happen at a later time, as he was livestreaming at the time, with which Lambovski agreed. Ivanov later explained that he had only known Lambovski for a short while, saying that the two had met during the "Eight Dwarfs" investigation, but denied any links to the criminal underworld. Ivanov added that "all of Bulgaria knew" that PM Borisov had "deep SIC roots" and claimed that the event was part of a government propaganda campaign to smear his reputation. Nevertheless, the events led to calls by some demonstrators for Ivanov to reveal the full extent of his conversation with Lambovski, so as not to degrade the protest movement's anti-mafia credentials, as they deemed his current explanations to be insufficient.

PM Borisov then stated in an interview before the media that he was still willing to work with Hristo Ivanov, stating that Ivanov had been his deputy in previous governments and Borisov did not desire for Ivanov to resign from any position. On the other hand, Borisov stated that he would only demand the resignation of President Radev.

==== 11 August – Socialist motion passes; Scientists call for government resignation ====
The opposition Socialist Party succeeded in pushing through a motion to interrupt the National Assembly's recess and hold an extraordinary meeting of the assembly on 13 August. The socialists demanded that the government provide explanations regarding the violent incidents that occurred during the ruling party's conference, and reviewed the budget amendments introduced by the government. Socialist leader Korneliya Ninova stated that her party would continue to push for the government's resignation, as they opined that the cabinet's resignation coupled with early parliamentary elections would be the only way to solve the country's political crisis.

Meanwhile, in the town of Sliven, the joint headquarters of GERB and the SDS was splashed with red paint by a demonstrator in what the ruling party described as "an act of vandalism". Anti-government demonstrators reacted by scheduling another protest in front of the headquarters, demanding that the ruling coalition resign from power.

Later that day, nearly 170 scientists representing the Bulgarian Academy of Sciences signed an open letter that demanded the government's resignation. The scientists cited what they dubbed the "autocratic-mafioso style of governance", systemic corruption, alleged political abuse of the prosecution and insufficient measures against the COVID-19 pandemic as the reasons behind their demand.

==== 12 August – Government announces new social measures ====
Responding to popular discontent with the government's handling of the coronavirus pandemic, PM Borisov announced a second stimulus package, aimed primarily at schools, students and young families. The cabinet released a statement that the new stimulus package would amount 2,532,000 Bulgarian lev.

Protesters rejected the new measures and stated that their demands had remained the same. In Sofia, the protesters marched to the German embassy in the country with blindfolds, which demonstrators stated alluded to the perceived indifference of the European Union towards Borisov's alleged mafia-style of leadership. A group of protesters also once again blocked the intersection in front of Sofia's university, which another group of demonstrators had voluntarily freed two days prior.

As police forces in the country had so far prevented demonstrators from physically blocking the Trakia motorway several times, groups of anti-government demonstrators instead took to blocking the highway by merging into it with their vehicles, then driving at low speeds across all lanes of traffic, thus effectively creating a rolling roadblock that resulted in a kilometers-long traffic jam which blocked the motorway. Similar roadblock motorcades were held shortly thereafter in Haskovo and Veliko Tarnovo, effectively blocking traffic in a large section of both cities for several hours.

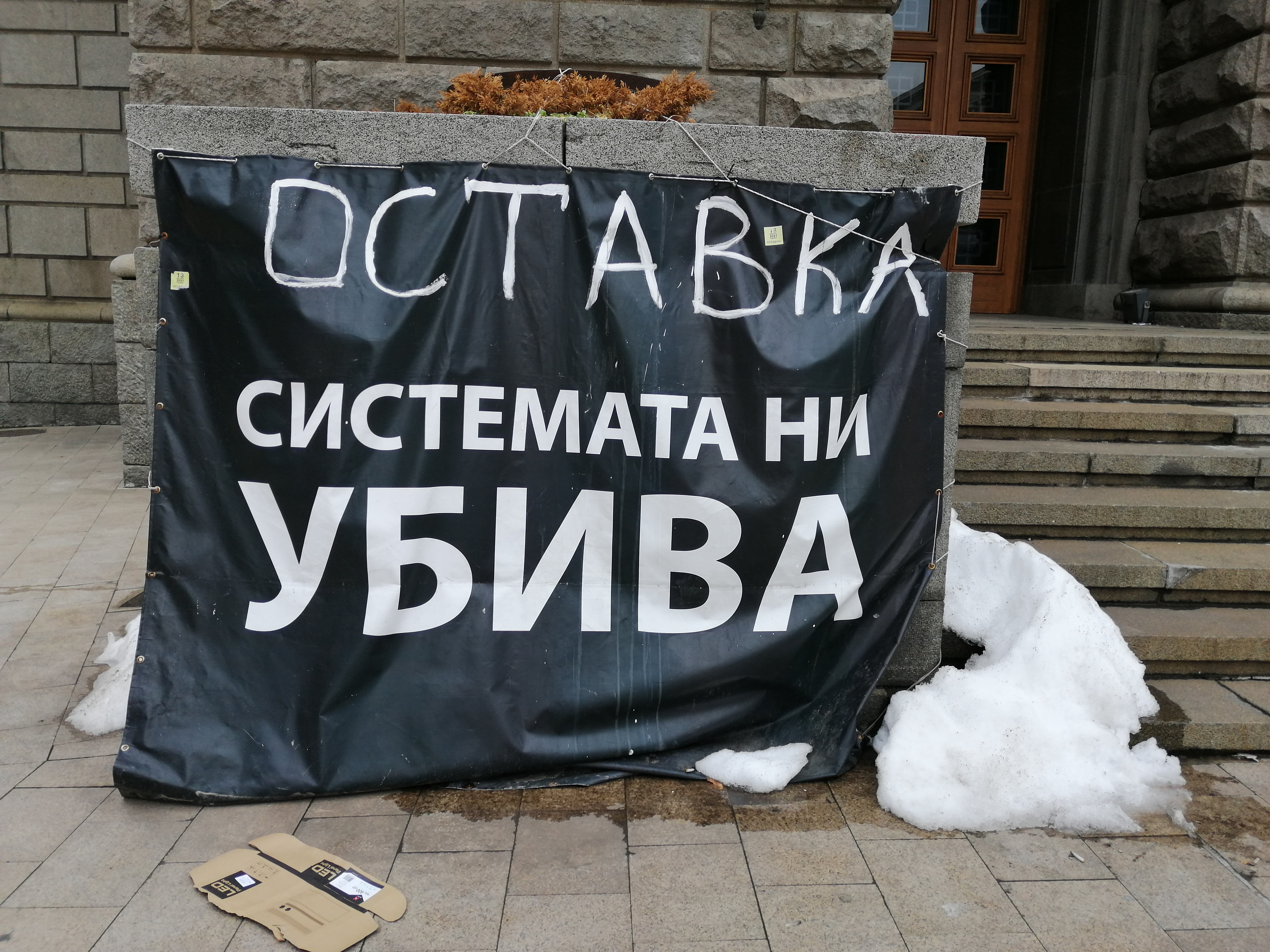
A protest banner with the words "Resignation! The system is killing us!"

==== 13 August – Extraordinary session fails; Blockades worsen ====
The extraordinary session of the nation's parliament failed due to lack of a quorum. Besides the Socialist parliamentary group that had called the extraordinary session, it was only attended by a handful of MPs from the DPS, two from GERB and one from Volya. The Socialist Parliamentary group then accused the ruling party's MPs of being "too afraid" to attend the session, while GERB's parliamentary boss accused Socialist leader Korneliya Ninova of "not doing everything to attain the quorum". Following the announcement of the failure of the session, as well as the Prime Minister's absence from the assembly, protesters jeered and threw eggs at the assembly.

On the 36th night of protests, the blockades worsened as demonstrators established more barricades, blocking the intersections around the Romanian embassy in Sofia, while another group of demonstrators blocked the Danube Bridge that serves as the link between Bulgaria and Romania.

==== 14 August – Prime Minister calls for a Grand National Assembly ====
===== Proposal =====
In an unexpected move, Prime Minister Borisov addressed the nation on TV and stated that he was ready to resign, pending the calling of elections of a Grand National Assembly – an elected constituent assembly responsible for amendments to Bulgaria's constitution. He further proposed the following constitutional amendments:

- That the amount of elected representatives in the ordinary National Assembly be reduced from 240 to 120, while the amount of elected representatives in the Grand National Assembly be reduced from 400 to 280
- That Bulgaria's Supreme Judicial Council, the nation's highest judicial organ, be abolished and instead replaced by two institutions – a Judicial Judges' Council and a Judicial Prosecutorial Council
- That the powers of the Minister for Justice be reduced only to proposing budgets and to administering the judicial system's real estate properties
- The creation of an "Institute of individual constitutional petitions"
- A mandate for the Chief Prosecutor to deliver a report to the national assembly once every six months
- To allow for the national assembly to interview the Chief Prosecutor on individual judicial cases, after receiving permission from the prosecutor on said case

Furthermore, he called for 200 of the Grand National Assembly's 400 representatives to be elected through a majoritarian FPTP system instead of proportionally – a change that would favour the ruling party. His proposals would require a 2/3 supermajority in the nation's ordinary national assembly, before a vote on a grand national assembly could be held.

===== Reactions =====
The reactions to his speech came almost immediately – his coalition partners from the VMRO demanded additional amendments that would disfranchise those not meeting specific education requirements by banning them from voting in elections or referendums, the introduction of compulsory voting (already present, though unenforced in Bulgaria), "protection for the rights of ethnic Bulgarians", a return of mandatory conscription for all males, prohibitions against a potential future legalization of same-sex marriage (already present in the constitution) and an increase in the powers of the Presidency. His other allies from the SDS enthusiastically supported Borisov's proposal, calling it "statesmanly and timely" and opining that only right-wing European People's Party members could "close the pages of the Lilovo-Lukanite constitution".

Meanwhile, opposition leader Maya Manolova rejected the proposals, rhethorically asking the prime minister of his speech was written by gangsters or Delyan Peevski.

The Bulgarian Socialist Party's parliamentary secretary stated that he viewed the amendments only as an attempt by Borisov to calm down the protesters and remarked that they contained "a fair dose of populism".

Volya leader Veselin Mareshki, who had until then supported the government, stated that he saw the calling of elections for a Grand National Assembly as an "absolutely unnecessary construction" and a "waste of time".

There Are Such People leader Slavi Trifonov commented that in putting forward these proposals, Borisov had become "the official leader of the protests against himself".

Democratic Bulgaria leader Hristo Ivanov remarked that the proposed amendments were a "very late step in a good direction", calling the proposals "not so much a new constitution, but rather a serious revision [of the existing constitution]".

Protesters at the barricades rejected the PM's proposals, expressing both a doubt that Borisov could push the amendments through and that the amendments would have a positive effect on the country.

Later that day, the proposals were also rejected by President Rumen Radev, who stated that the constitution only allowed for a Grand National Assembly to be called for by either a majority in the national assembly or by the President – not by the Prime Minister. He then accused the Prime Minister of violating the law, suppressing freedom of speech and turning "Bulgaria's parliamentary democracy into an autocracy", after which he once again called for the government's resignation.

By the evening, the protests deepened as demonstrators established yet more barricades. The Pass of the Republic through the Balkan Mountains was blocked by demonstrators which stated that they would only allow automobiles carrying sick people, children or emergency services through. Meanwhile, a protest motorcade blocked the road near Kalotina for several hours, creating a 15-kilometer-long traffic jam. Protesters also attempted to block the international route E79 between Blagoevgrad and Simitli, but were prevented from doing so by police and gendarme forces. Shortly thereafter, protesters attempted to block the route again, this time tying their hands in chains to prevent themselves from being removed by police. This attempt led to clashes between protesters and the police, which managed to prevent the demonstrators from closing the road. Protesting crowds refused to leave and instead began attempting to tie down gendarme vehicles and establish road blocks, leading to intermittent clashes between themselves and the authorities.

==== 17 August – Ministry of Justice occupation attempt; Constitutional amendments introduced ====
Early that morning, a group of anti-government protesters stormed the Ministry of Justice building, insisting vehemently to speak to the minister for justice himself. The demonstrators were stopped from reaching his office by security guards, at which point the former began shouting slogans demanding the resignations of the government, which in turn led to verbal altercations between themselves and the guards. The group then occupied and blocked the building's entrance for half an hour, after which they left toward Eagles' Bridge.

By noon, the ruling party's parliamentary chief deposited GERB's new constitutional amendment proposals before the national assembly. The proposal diverged from GERB's previous public announcement, surprisingly proposing the abolition of the institution of the Grand National Assembly entirely, instead transferring all of its responsibilities over to the ordinary National Assembly. The proposed clause that would have allowed citizens to petition the nation's constitutional court directly was also removed from the proposal, while the terms of the chief justices and the chief prosecutor were shortened to 5 years. On that date, protesters once again blocked the intersection in front of the Romanian embassy in Sofia.

==== 18 August – Ministry of Interior Affairs pelted with eggs and tomatoes ====
In the evening of the 41st day of protests, thousands of protesters marched to the Ministry of Interior Affairs in downtown Sofia, and pelted it with eggs and tomatoes.

==== 19 August – Ombudsman defects; Nikolay Barekov opposes Hristo Ivanov ====
The ruling party was reported as having struck a deal to secure the supermajority necessary to push through its proposed constitutional amendments. This came after Volya Movement leader Veselin Mareshki announced his support for the proposals, pending the addition of his demand for majoritarian single-member district majority voting. The BSP announced its opposition to the amendments, while the DPS refused to comment. The ruling party however suffered a defection after the government-appointed National Ombudsman and former GERB Minister for Justice Diana Kovacheva announced that she would oppose the amendments, claiming that they would turn the Ombudsman into a "puppet" and might degrade human rights in the country.

Former media mogul and MEP Nikolay Barekov announced that he would start organizing protests not only against the government, but also against Democratic Bulgaria leader Hristo Ivanov. Barekov alleged that Ivanov only protests against Ahmed Dogan, while ignoring other "stooges". He also alleged that Ivanov and his party had attempted to take over and subsequently divided and marginalized the protest movement through the use of "paid crazies". He further questioned Ivanov about alleged ties to the criminal underworld and claimed that his party maintained "shining office inside a super luxurious building" while not being entitled to a state subsidy. To this end, he called for anti-Ivanov and anti-Borisov protesters to occupy Democratic Bulgaria's offices in the following days.

The daily protests in Sofia were joined by groups campaigning for disability rights, anti-racism, and LGBT rights, which organized a procession around the capital, accompanied by musical bands made up from ethnic minorities.

==== 20 August ====
In the evening of the 43rd day of protests, thousands of protesters marched once again to the Ministry of Interior Affairs in downtown Sofia and pelted it with loads of eggs, tomatoes and toilet paper.

==== 21 August – Protesters hang banner from major historic monument ====
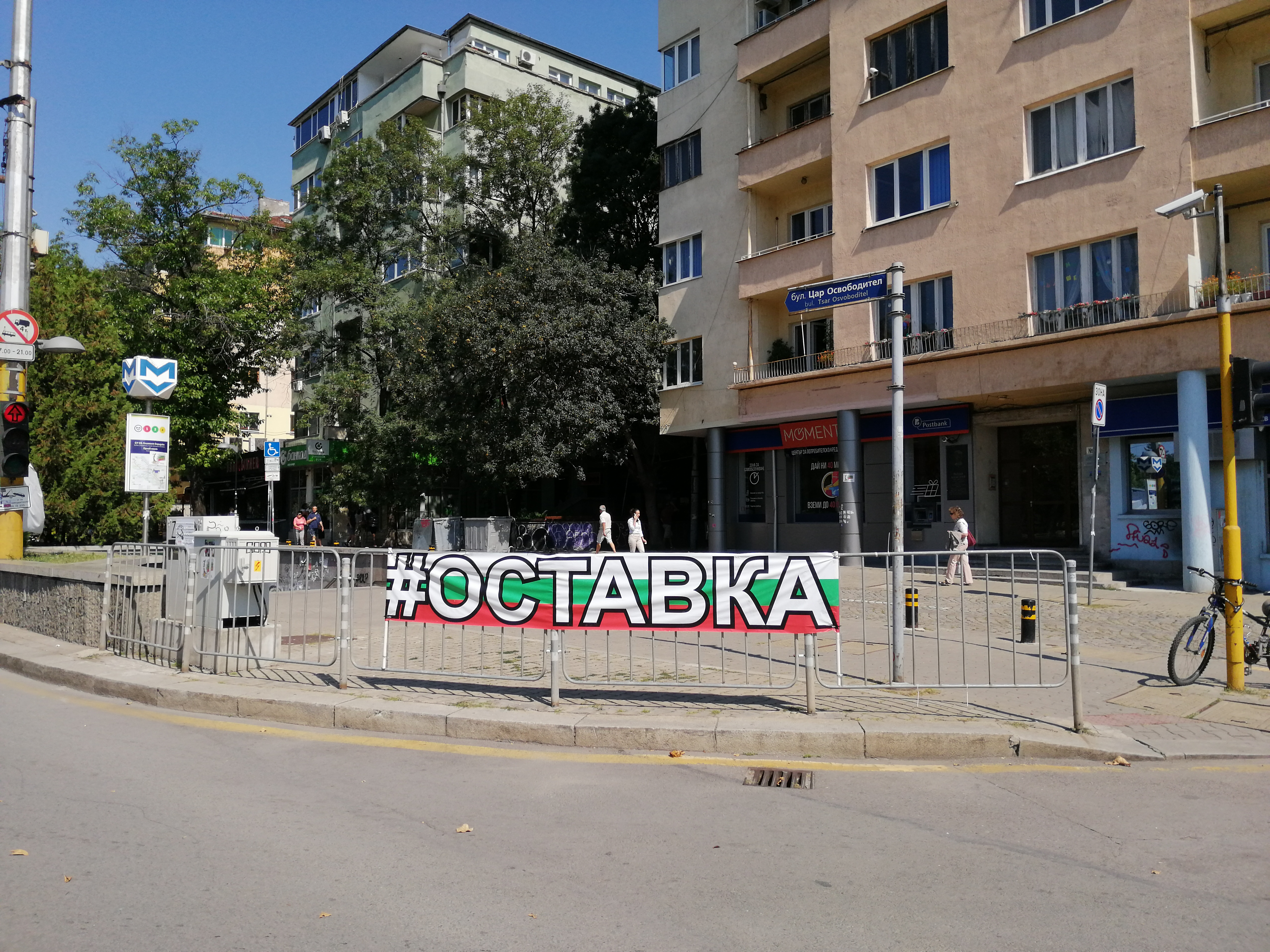
A tricolour banner demanding the government's resignation. The banner is similar, though considerably smaller than the one hung by the protesters from the Shipka Monument

As Bulgaria marked the 143 year anniversary of the battle of Shipka Pass, one of the defining moments in Bulgaria's history, a group of five anti-government demonstrators barricaded themselves inside the Shipka monument that commemorates the events of the battle. The group then hung a large banner in the colors of the Bulgarian flag with the phrase "RESIGN" superimposed on top. They were forcefully removed from the historic monument by police forces, which also took down their banner. The Poisonous Trio - an informal group of three protest organizers criticised the move, stating that national monuments shouldn't be used for political purposes, while the historic site's custodian defined it as an "insult".

President Radev, who gave a speech at the event, did not comment on the banner, but stated that the government and chief prosecutor should resign immediately, which he opined ought to be followed by a self-dissolution of the nation's parliament, which he defined as "discredited and now stripped of any legitimacy".

Meanwhile, the Security Union, a labour union representing judicial police officers and prison guards organized its own protest in front of the Palace of Justice in the city of Burgas. The Security Union alleged that the Minister for Justice had violated previously concluded agreements between himself and the union and misappropriated funds earmarked for the two services it represents. Several hours after the protest had started, the Justice Minister agreed to meet with union representatives, to whom he promised to renew and uphold the agreements.

==== 25 August – Dead fish in front of the Council of Ministers ====
On the 48th day of protests, a few thousand protesters unloaded piles of dead fish in front of the Council of Ministers.

==== 26 August – Minister for Justice resigns ====
The Minister for Justice Danail Kirilov announced that he would be resigning from his post. Bulgarian media linked his resignation to the scandals surrounding the Rosenets beach incident and the government's constitutional amendment proposals, as well as to an order PM Borisov had issued him about a month prior. The order in question forbade Kirilov from making any comments on social media and was seen as insulting to him and his position. Kirilov was widely expected to be 'sacrificed' by Borisov during the 23 July government reshuffle, but ended up unaffected and remained in his position until his decision to resign on 26 August.

==== 27 August – Electoral Commission Chairwoman resigns ====
Stefka Stoeva, the Chairwoman of Bulgaria's supreme electoral authority – the Central Electoral Council announced her resignation during the council's daily meeting. Although the resignation cited "private reasons", it was immediately preceded by a 20-minute speech by Stoeva, in which she starkly criticized the government's announced electoral reforms.

==== 31 August – Government majority in jeopardy ====
DPS Chairman Mustafa Karadaya announced that following deliberations, his party had decided to distance itself from the government's constitutional amendment proposals and said that his party would not sign or support the amendment motion in parliament. This move left the government without a clear majority, as it meant that besides the ruling GERB, the government could only count on the unconditional support of the NFSB and the conditional support of VMRO, with all of Bulgaria's remaining parties reacting either ambivalently or with open opposition to the ruling party's proposals.

=== September ===
==== 2 September ====
===== New National Assembly Session, DPS announces third position =====
The National Assembly met for the first time since beginning of its recess, meeting for the first time in the new assembly building designed to insulate the assemblymen from the protests and journalists. The Association of European Journalists criticised the move, stating that the new building's security protocols prohibited journalists from accessing the assembly floor itself and instead limited them to only being able to cover predefined "protocol messages".

Bulgarian President Rumen Radev took to the tribune with a raised fist, while the pro-government GERB, NFSB and VMRO deputies refused to hear his speech and demonstratively left the building as soon as the president ascended the tribune. Radev criticised the assembly, stating that it had become "a mute and obedient executor of the prime minister's will" and reiterated his belief that the only way to solve the political crisis in the country was through the resignation of the entire government, followed by early elections. Following the end of the president's speech, the ruling coalition deputies returned to the floor and made their own statement, accusing Radev of having supported "purges" and "rebellions" and stated that "history would never remember a politician with a raised fist positively".

Most surprisingly of all, DPS leader Mustafa Karadaya then took to the floor and announced that his party will demand that both the government and the president resign. Karadaya lambasted the president's support for the protest movement and asserted that only his party could "guarantee the rights and freedoms of the individuals, the territorial integrity and national sovereignty of the country, the irreplacability of the democracy and the free market economy".

===== Grand National Revolt =====
Meanwhile, the protests in front of the assembly escalated dramatically. As protest leaders called for a "Grand National Revolt" (a play on words on "Grand National Assembly"), anti-government protesters attempted to break the police cordon and storm the assembly while it was in session, leading to physical clashes between themselves and security forces. Violence erupted, with police using tear gas against the demonstrators, also injuring several journalists in the process. Demonstrators responded by throwing firecrackers, bales of hay and bottles at the authorities. The Gendarmerie was called to assist police forces, but its buses were blocked by protesting crowds and tensions rose as they attempted to arrest one of the demonstrators. The protesters forced the gendarmes to release the arrestee. The situation nevertheless did not defuse and some protesters started throwing bricks at the authorities, after which they set fire to more bales of hay and hurled the burning hay at the policemen. In an emergency press conference, the authorities stated that protesters had exposed the policemen to unknown gasses, which they were allegedly attempting to use as a weapon against security forces. They reported that over 20 police officers had been injured by 10:00, announcing that the police had begun to arrest some demonstrators and threatened to use physical force "if tensions escalate". Emergency medical services reported that by 15:15 they had intervened to treat over 38 people injured in the Sofia clashes, hospitalizing 21 and giving field treatment to the remaining 17. They also reported that another 30 bogus calls to the services were made. Ivaylo Ivanov, the Secretary-General of the Ministry of Interior claimed that the protesters had overstepped boundaries quite a bit, throwing self-made explosive devices at policemen, resulting in numerous injuries. Provocateurs affiliated with football fan clubs are believed to have played a major part in the escalation. According to police sources, 30 out of the 35 arrested demonstrators had previous criminal transgressions.

Anti-government demonstrators also erected roadblocks at several key points across the country, blocking the Danube Bridge, the Veleka Bridge near Sinemorets and the Bulgarian-Romanian border checkpoint near Silistra as part of the "Grand National Revolt".

Meanwhile, Bulgarian police arrested Kostadin Kostadinov, leader of the anti-government Vazrazhdane party who was attending that day's protests.

===== Government secures a slim majority =====
Later that day, GERB announced that it had managed to secure a majority in the house and would be depositing their proposed constitutional amendments after having managed to convince a faction of Volya deputies and a couple of independent MPs to support the government, in addition to obtaining assurances from the VMRO that the latter would continue supporting the government. The news of this development was not received positively by the protesters, which in turn stated that the protests would continue until the definitive resignation of the entire government. At the same time, the demonstrators that had blocked the Danube Bridge earlier that day voluntarily lifted their blockade, after they learned that their roadblock had caused a minor road traffic accident on a nearby small road, as well as massive traffic jams deep into neighbouring Romania.

===== Peaceful protest turns to violent riot =====
By around 22:00, news of the arrests alongside the government's decision to stay in power turned the so far entirely peaceful protest into a violent riot. Radical protesters attacked the stationed policemen by subjecting them to a hail of thrown objects, including a device the police described as an IED. One of the protest organizers, Nikolay Hadjigenov, appealed to the crowd to stop the violence and continue protesting peacefully. The radical groups rejected his pleas and instead began attacking him as well. Several peaceful anti-government demonstrators also attempted to reason with the more radical camp in an attempt to stop the protest from turning into a riot, but their attempts were unsuccessful. They were pushed aside and their protest tent camp was then destroyed by the radicals, which took rubble from the broken remains of the camp and threw it at the police officers. A group of peaceful demonstrators then attempted to form a human wall cordon in front of the officers in an attempt to protect them from thrown objects. They were also targeted by the radical group and withdrew after brief clashes.

By 23:00 the Gendarmes advanced on the enraged crowd and attempted to disperse it. After clashing with demonstrators, security forces had managed to divide the protesting crowd in two. The crowd nevertheless resisted and chanted insults that compared security forces to janissaries. The Chief of Bulgarian Police stated that the violence had begun after hardcore football hooligans had infiltrated that day's protests and accused an "organized football hooligan mob" of that day's escalation.

Footage of the clashes between police and anti-government forces in the early hours of 3 September

By midnight, the police had brought a water cannon to assist with the dispersal of the protest and attacked demonstrators with tear gas, pepper spray and baton charges. Tens of policemen and protesters were reported to have been injured, and a police action to arrest protesters had begun. Journalist Dimitar Kenarov was handcuffed, dragged and kicked in the head by police. His camera was broken and he was pushed against the pavement for several hours despite him presenting his press card. The Association of European Journalists condemned the violence against Kenarov and stated that they will report this case of police brutality to their international partner organizations.

==== 3 September – Police crackdown ====
In the early night hours of the day, the police engaged in brutal clashes with protesting crowds. The police reported that over 80 of their own were wounded in the clashes, while over 200 protesters were arrested. At around 3:00 security forces charged at and dismantled two of the three tent camps in the city.

===== Protests continue =====
By 10:30 anti-government protesters once again attempted to block one of Sofia's main boulevards, while the police blocked them from doing so. Following brief clashes security forces shoved the protesters back to the sidewalks. Arrests followed and a further 34 people were arrested by the authorities by 15:30 under accusations of hooliganism. Despite this, demonstrators had managed to push back police forces and successfully occupy the boulevard by the afternoon.

Meanwhile, the ruling party announced that a potential government resignation was out of the question and blamed the protest organizers, as well as President Radev, for the previous night's violence.

===== President Radev accuses the government =====
By evening, President Radev addressed the nation on live television. He accused the government of having used agent provocateurs to radicalize the protest movement, so as to give an excuse for the security forces to unleash "massive and disproportional police brutality against protesters and journalists". Radev appealed to both the protesters and security forces to remain calm and "refuse to be involved in an orchestrated play to save the corrupt government". He finished his speech by demanding the "immediate and unconditional resignation of the cabinet" as the "only possible exit out of the crisis". Similar accusations were made by several prominent protest leaders from the "Poisonous Trio", who stated that the protest movement had carried on peacefully for 55 days, before unknown aggressive individuals had infiltrated the previous day's protests.

At 19:30, a large anti-government rally marched peacefully through the capital and continued until past midnight, blocking several roads, but avoiding clashes with the authorities. Police forces nevertheless stormed and blocked the area around the Sofia Archaeological Museum, due to what they called an "unidentified item". Protest organizers called for a rebuilding of the demolished barricades, some of which were briefly rebuilt, but then taken down again voluntarily by the protesters.

==== 4 September – Hippoland investigation ====
Police arrests continued, notably detaining Aleksandar Branekov, a football star that had formerly played for CSKA Sofia and Lokomotiv Sofia under accusation that he threw paving stones at security forces during the 2 September riot.

Authorities from various government branches raided Hippoland, a company selling children's toys, after it was revealed that the owner and his son had attended the anti-government protests and criticised the police. The country's interior ministry denied that the raids were political in nature and stated that they had found a "discrepancy" between the company's balance sheet and cash on hand worth around 9,60 lev (around 6 US dollars). Anti-government demonstrators took to supporting Hippoland by gathering outside its stores across the country, following which the investigations into the company were suspended by the authorities.

As protests gathered in the city centre, police forces set up checkpoints to control the flow of people around the protests. Meanwhile, anti-government demonstrators once more built a new tent camp next to the main government buildings in the city. The protesters called for a "Grand National Revolt 2" on 10 September, but stated that they would not support violence. Many demonstrators at the rally brought toys purchased from Hippoland in an act of solidarity with the company.

The "Poisonous Trio" of protest organizers called for a boycott against the nation's parliament by all opposition parties represented within it. Following their calls, only 119 of the country's 240 parliamentarians registered their attendance in the session, two short of the 121 minimum for a quorum. This paralyzed the national assembly and led to the failure of the parliamentary sitting due to the lack of a quorum. The news of this were greeted by "RESIGN" chants from the socialist deputies that attended, but did not register for the sitting.

==== 7 September – Socialists' parliamentary boycott ====
The Bulgarian Socialist Party, the largest parliamentary opposition party in the country, announced that it would extend its parliamentary boycott indefinitely, refusing to register its deputies in the national assembly in an attempt to strip the chamber of the quorum necessary for it to function. The Socialists announced that they would attend only if it concerns the introduction of machine voting or for the dissolution of the assembly, while boycotting all other parliamentary business. The leader of GERB's parliamentary group expressed apathy for their decision, stating that "they were going to leave – they should leave!".

==== 9 September – DPS refuses to boycott parliament ====
The National Assembly's quorum was saved by the DPS, which took a last-minute decision to register their presence in the chamber and abstain from joining the Socialists' boycott.

==== 10 September – Grand National Revolt 2 ====
Anti-government protests began as early as 8:00, as crowds gathered in an attempt to block the pro-government majority deputies from making their way into the assembly building. Despite this and due to a heavy police presence, the deputies managed to enter the building through its side entrance and declared that they would not be resigning. The demonstrators managed to block a major Sofia boulevard, but their gathering was limited by many police checkpoints, that screened and limited the flow of people into the protest. Police forces reported that six protesters were arrested, among which several which carried water guns and one woman that had a can of pepper spray in her purse. Authorities also reported raiding a nearby park and finding bottles, unidentified knives, unidentified liquids, as well as several sticks and stones in the dirt, adding that items such as those could be dangerous and justify the control measures imposed on the protests. Meanwhile, the Socialist deputies refused to even enter the assembly and instead joined the protesting crowds as ordinary citizens. The government initially stated that it had obtained a quorum, but a headcount two hours later revealed that a quorum was, in fact, lacking. This once again paralyzed the assembly and the members of parliament were escorted out of the building under guard shortly before 11:00.

==== 16 September – Infiltration of the parliament; Quorum narrowly reestablished ====
Anti-government protesters from The System Kills Us, accompanied by Maya Manolova and her organization Izpravise.BG infiltrated the new parliament building and barricaded themselves inside alongside a young person with cerebral palsy in a wheelchair. From inside, the demonstrators attempted to distribute declarations calling for the dissolution of the assembly and fresh elections, which they wanted members of parliament to sign. Ultimately, their declarations were only signed by three socialist assembly members before the demonstrators were forcefully removed from the building by police and guards from the National Service for Protection. Protesters and politicians from the opposition blamed chair of the National Assembly Tsveta Karayancheva for disallowing access to the Parliament's toilet for the disabled person and for ordering the forceful removal of protesters by the National Service for Protection. The BSP and DPS demanded Karayancheva's resignation.

As the assembly began its session, the government managed to secure a 121-seat quorum for the assembly, narrowly securing the functioning of the chamber by a present majority of just one person. However, the government failed to convince the assembly to pass its proposed electoral reform, intended to switch Bulgaria to a more majoritarian electoral system, resulting in their motion failing in the chamber.

==== 22 September – Grand National Revolt 3 ====
The third major protest under the slogan of Grand National Revolt occurred on Bulgaria's Independence Day. Thousands gathered at the Largo after 17:00 to demand the government's resignation. Chairman of the National Assembly Tsveta Karayancheva was met by protesters in Veliko Tarnovo where she delivered a speech on account of Independence Day. Protesters hooted and shouted "resign" throughout her whole speech, forcing her to interrupt it on one occasion. Later in the evening protesters marched to the old Parliament building and attempted to circumvent it, but were stopped by a heavy police cordon. This resulted in minor clashes with police forces, but there were no seriously injured people and only one person was arrested.

==== 24 September – DPS headquarters pelted with eggs ====
At the end of the 78th day of protests, anti-government demonstrators marched to the headquarters of the DPS and pelted it with loads of eggs.

==== 25 September – Sofia Municipality building pelted with eggs ====
On the 79th day since the beginning of the protests, the demonstrators focused on their demand for the resignation of Sofia mayor Yordanka Fandakova, and marched to the Sofia Municipality building, pelting it with a multitude of eggs.

=== October ===
==== 3 October – Grand National Revolt 4 ====
Tens of thousands of demonstrators gathered in downtown Sofia for the 4th edition of the Grand National Revolts. Later in the evening, the protesters marched to the Alexander Nevsky Cathedral, this time without any altercations with the police forces.

==== 16 October – Grand National Revolt 5 ====
On the 100th day of the protests thousands of demonstrators gathered in the Bulgarian capital for the 5th Grand National Revolt. In the early afternoon a group of students from Sofia University carrying a large "Resign" banner were halted by police as they tried to join the larger group of demonstrators at the Largo. In response, protesters from the Largo marched towards the university and the police was forced to let the students pass.

Members of the European Parliament Paul Tang from the Netherlands and Ivan Sinčić from Croatia joined the protest and addressed the crowd from the stage. Romanian MEP Ramona Strugariu also express her support for the demonstrators via video conference. Irish MEP Clare Daly was expected to speak via video conference, but due to the worsening weather conditions it was announced that she would instead attend the protest personally on the following day.

Despite intensifying thunderstorm, demonstrators marched towards Alexander Nevsky Cathedral where Priest Dionisiy said a prayer. The procession then continued towards the Bulgarian National Television where a live debate show hosted one of the protest leaders Arman Babikyan. Protesters again demanded the resignation of BNT director general Emil Koshlukov and clashed with police during a brief attempt to storm the building. It was announced that this would be the last Grand National Revolt and that the protests would take a different approach from now on.

An anti-government demonstration was also held in Varna in support of Grand National Revolt 5.

==== 19 October – Ministry of Defence pelted with eggs and tomatoes ====
On the evening of the 103rd day of protests, the demonstrators marched to the Ministry of Defence and pelted the building with loads of eggs and tomatoes.

==== 20 October – COVID-related protest ====
On 20 October 2020, there were anti-mask sentiments expressed by members of the protest movement, with many of the participants opposed to the compulsory wearing of masks in open air spaces.

==== 22 October – Ministry of Finance pelted with eggs and tomatoes ====
On day 106 since the beginning of the protests, anti-government demonstrators marched to the Ministry of Finance, pelting the building with multiple eggs and tomatoes.

=== November ===
==== 1 November – Poisonous Trio change their approach toward the daily protests ====
At the start of November, the "Poisonous Trio" stepped down as leaders and organizers of the daily protests, citing as a reason "an attempt to slow the spread of the virus", and changed their approach to "alternative and more infrequent forms of protest".

==== 3 November – Protest in front of the GERB headquarters ====
On the 118th day of protests in Sofia, demonstrators marched to the headquarters of the main ruling party GERB, demanding for the resignation of GERB leader and prime-minister Boyko Borisov.

==== 10 November – Protest in front of the Information Service building ====
In the evening of the 125th day since the beginning of the protests, demonstrators marched to the building of Information Service – the state company that is responsible for counting and tabulating the votes during elections in Bulgaria. The protesters demanded for the resignation of Information Service's chairman Mihail Konstantinov, because of his close ties with the ruling party. The anti-government demonstrators accused Information Service of engaging in electoral fraud, favoring the ruling party GERB, citing that "it doesn't matter who cast the votes, it matters who counts the votes".

==== 16 November – Protest in front of the VMRO headquarters ====
On the 131st day of protests, demonstrators gathered in front of the VMRO headquarters – one of GERB's coalition partners. From the windows of the higher floors of the building, the VMRO members and activists were throwing firecrackers and squirting water with a hose on top of the protesters. One of the VMRO activists was the member of the European Parliament – Angel Dzhambazki.

=== December ===
The protests continued in December, but they saw less turnout compared to the summer months.

==== 4 December – automobile parade ====
Protesters participated in their second vehicle parade (the first one took place in July), starting from the Bulgarian National Bank and reaching the Vrana Palace, maintaining a speed of 20 km/h and honking horns.

==== 23 December – focus on the office of the general prosecutor ====
The non-governmental organization "Justice for All" (Bulgarian: "Правосъдие за всеки") organized a demonstration in favor of removing the position of chief prosecutor. Tsar Osvoboditel Boulevard was temporarily blocked as well.

=== January ===
==== Protests continue into the new year ====
The daily protests continue into 2021 with several hundred demonstrators gathering to celebrate the new year, while demanding for Borisov's resignation in front of the Council of Ministers.

=== February ===
==== Second protest in front of Borisov's house ====
On February 13, anti-government demonstrators gathered for a second time (first time being in August) in front of PM Borisov's personal home in the western suburb of Sofia – Bankya. The protestors asserted that Borisov has committed many crimes for which they think he should face court trial and be sentenced to imprisonment. Borisov was not present at his home during the protest, with the house being presumably empty.

=== March ===
==== Third protest in front of Borisov's home ====
On March 6, anti-government protestors gathered for a third time in front of Boyko Borisov's private home in Bankya. The house was once again presumably empty. The demonstrators painted with chalk the street in front of the house, writing: "resignation", "prison", "murderer", "thief", "traitor", "mafia boss", "criminal", "coward", "liar", "damn you", "shame and disgrace" etc.

==== Protests in front of Dogan's mansion and Borisov's residence in Boyana ====
On March 13, anti-government demonstrators gathered in front of oligarch Ahmed Dogan's mansion in Sofia's southern neighborhood Boyana. Right after that, they went to the adjacent governmental residence of Prime Minister Borisov. The protestors wanted to meet Dogan and Borisov, in order to perform citizen's arrests on them. However, both political leaders did not show up.

==== Fourth protest in front of Borisov's house ====
On March 21, despite the bad winter conditions, anti-government demonstrators visited for a fourth time the private home of Prime Minister Boyko Borisov in Bankya. The protestors assured that they will gather in front of Borisov's house regularly, until after Borisov is put in prison for the many crimes that he has committed.

=== April ===
==== Protest in front of GERB's headquarters ====
On April 4, 2021, supporters of "The System is Killing Us", unhappy with the election results, demonstrated in front of the governing party's headquarters in the capital.

==== Protests end triumphantly ====
On April 16, 2021, after 282 consecutive days of demonstrations against the 3rd Borisov government, the core of the protestors declared the end of their daily protests, with the end of the 4-year term of the government, as the formal resignation of Boyko Borisov as Prime Minister of Bulgaria was accepted by the 45th parliament of Bulgaria.

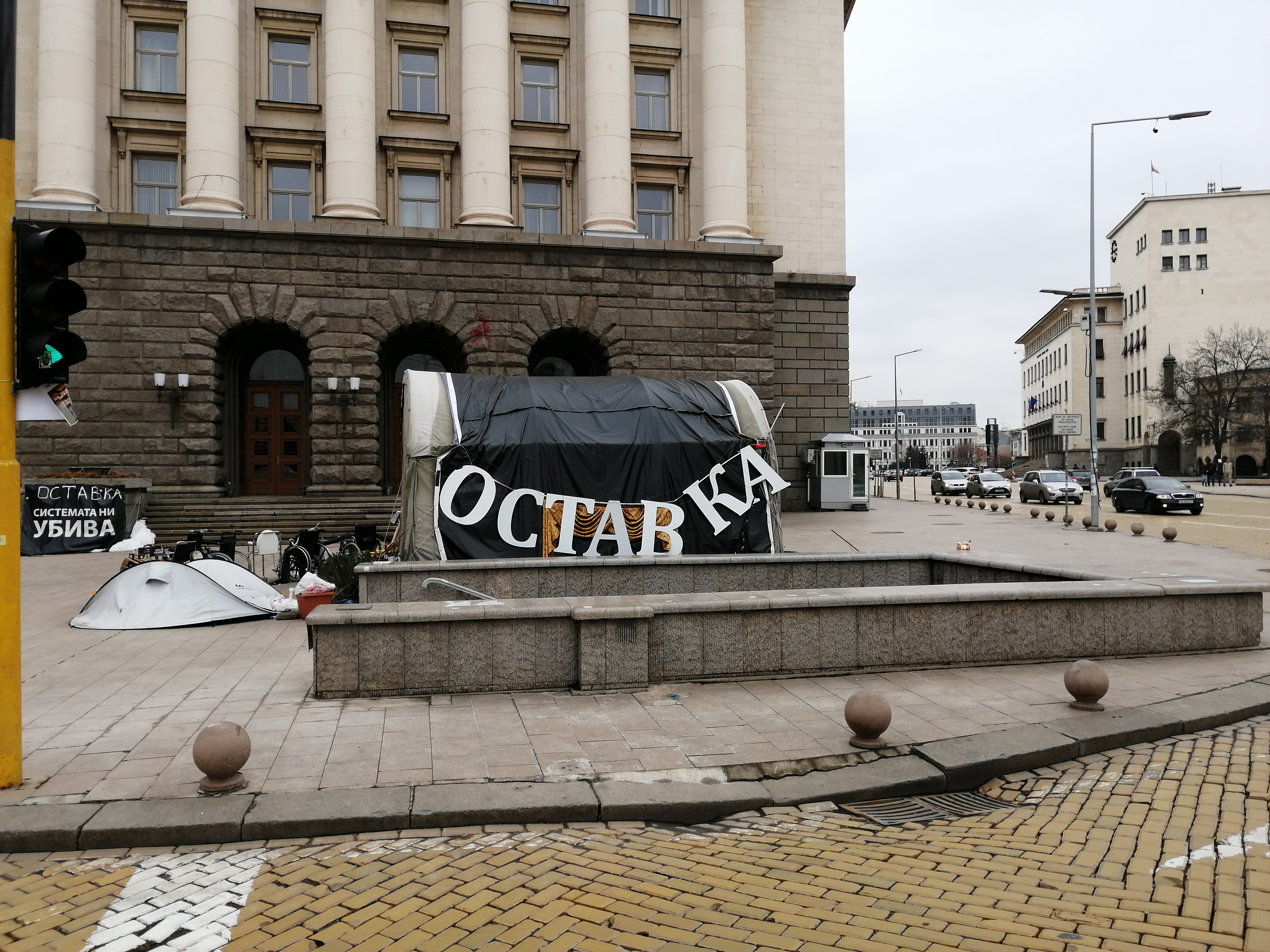
A protest tent camp

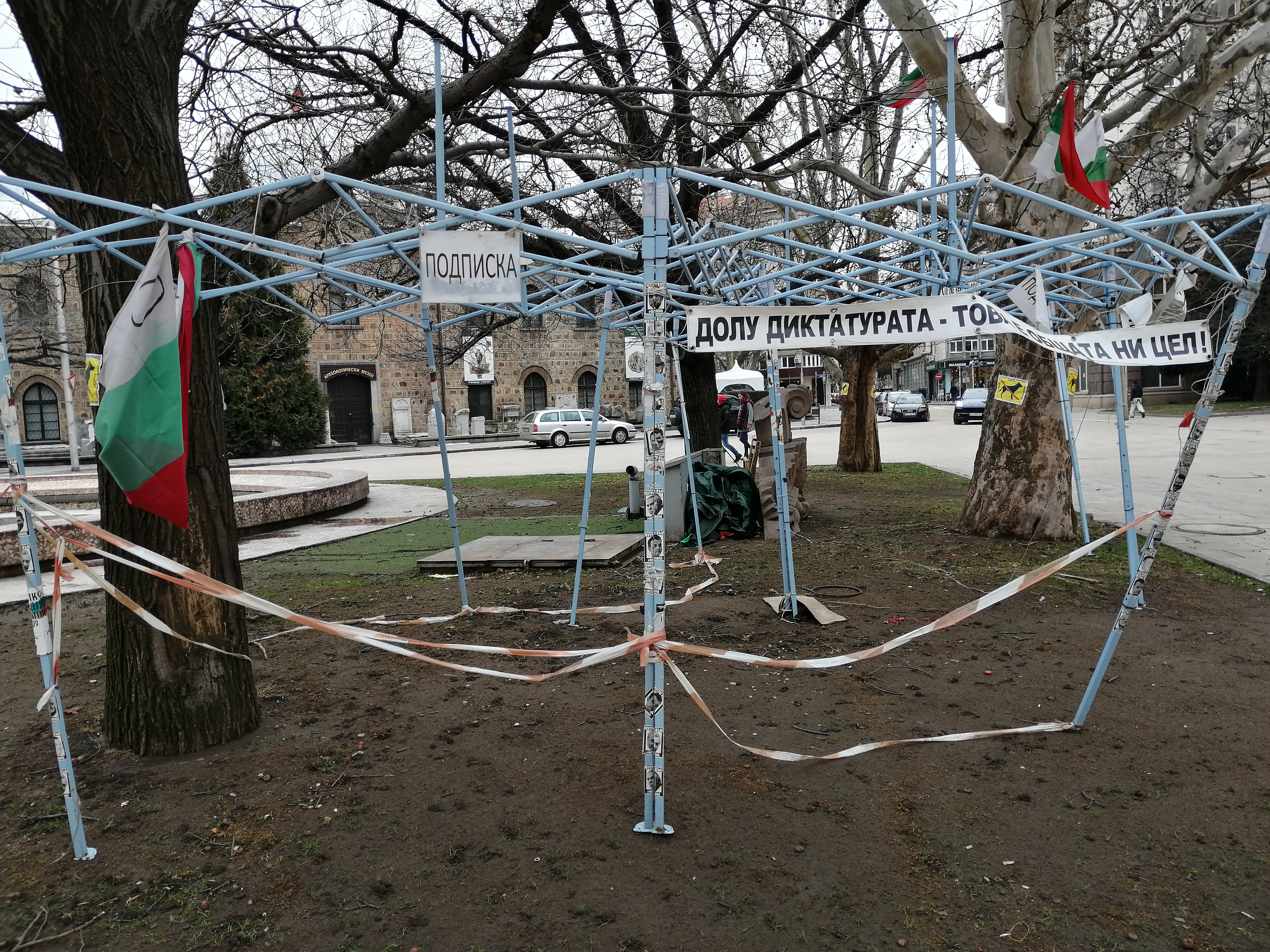
A protest site with Bulgarian flags

== Reactions ==
=== Opinion polls ===
==== Popular opinion on protest-related topics ====
| Date of Poll | Statement | Yes | No | No opinion/Don't know | Source |
|---|---|---|---|---|---|
Popular Opinion of the Protests
| 22–24 July 2020 | Do you support the protests? | 59% | 34% | 7% | Gallup International |
| 23–30 July 2020 | Do you support the protests? | 62,5% | 37,5% | – | Alpha Research |
| 30 July – 7 August 2020 | Do you support the protests? | 62% | 23,7% | 14,3% | Gallup International |
| 3–10 August 2020 | Do you support the protests? | 60% | 31% | 9% | Trend |
| 19–25 August 2020 | Do you support the protests? | 73% (Note: Includes 48.3% of respondents that supported the protests and another 24,7% that supported the protests with "certain reservations") | 19.8% | 7.2% | Sova Harris |
| 29 August – 5 September 2020 | Do you support the protests? | 62% | 30% | 8% | Trend |
| 3–11 September 2020 | Do you support the protests? | 67% | 25% | 8% | Gallup International |
| 21–30 September 2020 | Do you support the protests? | 66,2% | 33,8% | - | Alpha Research |
Popular Opinion of Borisov's Government
| 16 July 2020 | Should Borisov's government resign? | 58% | 32% | 10% | Gallup International |
| 3–5 August 2020 | Should Borisov's government resign? | 66% (Note: Includes 50% of respondents that favoured the resignation of the government and early elections, plus another 16% which favoured the resignation of the government, but without early elections) | 35% (Note: Includes 19% of respondents which stated that the government should be kept as it is, plus another 16% of respondents that preferred the government remain in power but conceded that some ministers should be replaced) | – | Afis |
| 30 July – 7 August 2020 | Should Borisov's government resign? | 58,9% | 26,5% | 14,6% | Gallup International |
| 30 July – 7 August 2020 | Do you trust Boyko Borisov? | 20% | 68% | 12% | Gallup International |
| 22–24 July 2020 | Should Borisov's government be put on trial? | 62% | – | – | Gallup International |
Popular Opinion of President Radev
| 22–24 July 2020 | Should President Radev resign? | 29% | 63% | 8% | Gallup International |
Popular Opinion on other related topics
| 22–24 July 2020 | Are early parliamentary elections necessary? | 42% | 54% | 4% | Gallup International |
| 3–5 August 2020 | Are early parliamentary elections necessary? | 50% | 50% (Note: A summary of all responses that did not endorse a new election – including respondents that stated that the government should resign and be replaced with a new government from within the same convocation of parliament, respondents which preferred a government reshuffle and respondents that supported no changes in the country's government.) | – | Afis |
| 30 July – 7 August 2020 | Are early parliamentary elections necessary? | 50% | 34% | 15,9% | Gallup International |
| 3–10 August 2020 | Are early parliamentary elections necessary? | 46% | 37% | 17% | Trend |
| 29 August – 5 September 2020 | Are early parliamentary elections necessary? | 47% | 37% | 16% | Trend |
| 3–11 September 2020 | Do you support government resignation and early parliamentary elections? | 59% | 30% | 11% | Gallup International |
| 22–24 July 2020 | Should the DPS be banned? | 36% | 52% | 12% | Gallup International |
| 21–30 September 2020 | Do you trust General Prosecutor Ivan Geshev? | 12% | 55% | 33% | Alpha Research |

==== Inclination to attend protests ====
| Date of Poll | Statement | Already attended anti-Borisov protest | Would attend anti-Borisov protest | Would attend pro-Borisov counter-protest | Already attended pro-Borisov counter-protest | Source |
|---|---|---|---|---|---|---|
| 16 July 2020 | Would you attend a protest? | 6% | 36% | 8% | 2% | Gallup International |

==== Proposed solutions to the crisis ====
| Date of Poll | Statement | The government should resign and new parliamentary elections should be held | The government should resign and should be replaced by a new government from the same convocation of the parliament | The government should stay, but some ministers should be replaced | The government should remain as it is | Source |
|---|---|---|---|---|---|---|
| 3–5 August 2020 | Which of these is your preferred solution to the crisis? | 50% | 16% | 16% | 19% | Afis |
| 21–30 September 2020 | Which of these is your preferred solution to the crisis? | 44% | 24,8% | - | 31,2% | Alpha Research |

==== Constitutional Amendments ====
| Date of Poll | Statement | An entirely new constitution should be adopted | The current constitution should be amended | The current constitution should remain as it is | Don't know | Source |
|---|---|---|---|---|---|---|
| 19–25 August 2020 | Which of these is your preferred solution? | 17% | 42,9% | 16,9% | 22,4% | Sova Harris |

=== International organizations ===
European Union – The European Union's leadership has been accused of having hand of supporting Borisov's government to remain silent over the country's corruption issues. On 14 July the European Commission expressed its support to the demonstrators right to protest.

- Party of European Socialists (PES) leader Sergei Stanishev issued a statement of support for the protest movement, announcing that the PES would stand behind protesters' demands.
- The European Green Party supported the protests and condemned what they dubbed "violence against peaceful protesters". It also condemned the positions of ALDE and the EPP.
- Alliance of Liberals and Democrats for Europe Party (ALDE) chairman Hans van Baalen supported MRF leader Ahmed Dogan and condemned what he dubbed "extremism" among the people that had "attacked him and his property". Van Baalen later apologised for his tweet stating that he was not informed enough about the situation.
- The leader of the European People's Party group (EPP), Manfred Weber, supported Borisov's government and stated that Bulgaria "needs Borisov, because he protects the border and doesn't demonstrate a pro-Russian orientation".
- Vice-President of the European Parliament Katarina Barley accused the Bulgarian government of spreading fake news about the discussions that took place at the European Parliament Committee on Civil Liberties, Justice and Home Affairs meeting on 28 August 2020. Chief Prosecutor Ivan Geshev claimed that the meeting had been initiated by him, while GERB MEP Emil Radev (who did not attend personally) falsely claimed that MEPs at the meeting had condemned some of the protesters' actions.
- Clare Daly, an MEP from the European United Left–Nordic Green Left, sharply criticised both the Borisov government and European institutions for their passive attitude. At a European Parliament hearing on 10 September, Daly urged EU institutions to "stop funding to these thugs", referring to Borisov and Geshev. She further accused Věra Jourová, European commissioner for Values and Transparency who chaired the hearing, of being complicit to Borisov's corruption: "If the [European] Commission thinks that progress in Bulgaria has been good over the past 13 years, my conclusion could only be that you are either grossly incompetent...or you are completely subservient to the interests of Borisov because of his connections with certain influential groupings in this Parliament and the EU. This individual has been clever enough not to target minorities in the way in which Hungary and Poland have, and has therefore escaped the rap while presiding over the most corrupt state in the European Union and a population which is the poorest we have. We have irrefutable evidence of his connection and interaction with prosecutor Geshev, giving orders about who should be prosecuted, covering up for his own allegations of money laundering in Spain, the harassment of judges, and so on...The people on the streets of Sofia...want to know are we going to stop funding these thugs, because European money is emboldening and enabling these people to engage in wholesale corruption which is penalising the Bulgarian citizens." She reiterated her position in an interview with bTV, further pointing out the Borisov government's involvement in luxury apartment deals and expressing frustration from EU institutional inaction.
- On 8 October 2020 the European Parliament approved a resolution on Bulgaria which states that the European Parliament:
  Expresses unequivocal support for the people of Bulgaria in their legitimate demands and aspirations for justice, transparency, accountability and democracy; firmly believes that peaceful demonstrations are a fundamental right in every democratic country and supports the right of people to peaceful protest; condemns any form of violence against peaceful demonstrations; underlines that freedom of expression and freedom of information must be respected at all times; highlights that the use of violence and disproportionate force is unacceptable; expresses in particular dismay at the allegations of use of force against women and children, including children with disabilities; is concerned by the unlawful and excessive audits of private businesses who have publicly expressed their support for the protests; condemns the violent and disproportionate intervention by the police during the protests in July–August–September 2020; calls on the Bulgarian authorities to ensure a full, transparent, impartial and effective investigation into the actions of the police"

The resolution furthermore expresses concerns about a series of developments, including:
- the potential adoption of a new electoral law just seven months prior to the elections
- the practice of hasty passing of legislation by the governing majority, often without proper debates
- the serious deterioration of media freedom and working conditions for journalists in Bulgaria over the past decade
- corruption, inefficiency, and a lack of accountability in the judiciary

The resolution "points out to the necessity of conducting serious, independent and active investigations and achieving results in the area of anti-corruption, organised crime and money laundering, and to thoroughly look into the allegations of high-level corruption represented in audio recordings in the summer of 2020, the Apartment Gate, the Guesthouse Gate, the Tanker Gate, the Rosenets seaside estate case or the scandal around the alleged illegal transfer of money from the Development Bank, which taken together suggest deep and systemic weaknesses in rule of law in Bulgaria".

Roberta Metsola, MEP from the Borisov-supporting European People's Party drew criticism after proposing several amendments to the resolution which sought to add statements about President Radev using the protests as his political platform and his advisers being accused of influence peddling. Furthermore, she proposed the removal of a reference to the misuse of EU funds and high-level corruption allegations that directly involve the Prime Minister and sought to add a claim that a prominent Bulgarian gambling boss with 18 charges raised against him was funneling cash to the protest movement. The latter was withdrawn by Metsola herself while the former were rejected by the Parliament.

=== National ===
- United States – On the fifth day of the protests, the US Embassy in Bulgaria backed the demands of the protesting people, stating that "nobody is above the law".

=== Domestic ===
==== Ruling party ====
- Prime Minister Boyko Borisov reacted to Radev's initial announcement with a refusal to resign: "GERB will stay in power because the coming financial crisis is the worst, and those who want power have shown that they cannot handle it". He further stated that "All we do is build. More than Todor Zhivkov. More than all the other prime ministers combined. Is that a reason to resign?"
- Vice Premier Tomislav Donchev stated that his party "will not allow a civil war to happen, even if we [GERB] can win it".
- Minister for Labour and Social Policy Denitsa Sacheva called the protests "a quasi form of anarcho-communism".
- GERB deputy Toma Bikov called the leaders of the protest "the scum of society" and "criminal gangs paid by Vasil Bozhkov" as part of a "plot".
- GERB MP Spas Garnevski (previously affiliated with the SDS and DSB) gave a public interview before state television in which he accused those wanting early elections of committing "national treason". He opined that he saw three groups of protesters: the first seeking to "commit a coup d'état to overthrow the government and install President Radev", the second made up from "marginal parties" supported by "ultra hooligans seeking to spill blood" and the third – young people that "don't know what they want".

==== Minority parties in the ruling coalition ====
- Vice Premier, IMRO leader and Minister of Defence Krasimir Karakachanov publicly lambasted the protests, stating that they had been organized by "a few Sorosoid NGOs and extra-parliamentary political parties hungry for power", claiming that the goal of the protests, in his view, was to "bring about gay marriage" and "create a gender republic", which he entirely disagreed with.
- IMRO made an official statement that they would continue supporting the Borisov-led government, so long as it "ended the excess tolerance and liberality" shown towards Bulgaria's Romani minority and "took measures end the Ziganization of Bulgaria". This came after an IMRO village mayor was hospitalized after getting into a fight with Romani.
- Valentin Kasabov, MP from the National Front for the Salvation of Bulgaria (NFSB), another coalition party allied to GERB, stated that "It's frightening when the herd begins to think of itself as a wolf pack. It is time that the owner, the shepherd [Boyko Borisov] takes out the club and put the herd back in its place".
- Vice Premier and NFSB leader Valeri Simeonov said that "The way things are going, we'll destroy the State so that we can appease the Planet of the Apes from the yellow cobblestones. No, thanks."
- SDS leader Rumen Hristov spoke at GERB's 5 August conference, announcing that his party wished to field a joint ticket with GERB in the next elections, rather than appear on the ballot as a separate party. He appealed for a "mobilization" so that the right-wing parties could win any elections they may face.

==== Official institutions ====
- Chief Prosecutor Ivan Geshev stated that he will not resign, calling the protests "orchestrated".

== Analysis and political commentary ==
Political scientists have characterized the protests as having many faces due to bringing together people who may not have a lot of common ground in terms of political orientations, as a result of which the demonstrations are also believed to have managed to transcend the old divide between left-wing and right-wing leaning Bulgarians, while exhibiting similarities to the 2013–14 Bulgarian protests against the Oresharski cabinet in terms of being dominated by political rather than social demands. Confederation of Labour Podkrepa leader Dimitar Manolov has seen the explicit support by a greater number of political parties for the protests as a weakness due to perceiving many of these political figures as untrustworthy, also depicting the demonstrations as lacking the energy of the anti-Oresharski ones and expressing disappointment with the absence of employment-related demands.

A major factor behind the citizen energy to protest has been the deep crisis of trust in the political elites, which has notably resulted in delegitimizing Boyko Borisov and Ivan Geshev, with resignation regarded as the only useful political move from the standpoint of the latter two. Artist and animator Theodore Ushev has similarly identified the main issue as being the "carricature of democracy" that Bulgarian society has been receiving over the last 30 years, expressing the viewpoint that no protest can be a failure and remaining optimistic about the future. According to political commentator Evgeniy Daynov the protests are deep-rooted and even civilizational, reflecting the dissatisfaction of many modern thinking young people with the non-democratic governing practices that are seen as typical of the 1990s, thus in a sense representing a revolt of the future against the past.

Writer Stefan Tsanev has been critical of the protest methods, such as the throwing of rotten produce at government buildings, and the non-compromising tone adopted by them, drawing parallels with the repressions associated with the dekulakization in Bulgaria. Coupled with the lack of clarity as to what the plan is once the aims of the protests are achieved, in his view this has lessened the protesters' appeal to the intellectuals.

Journalist and writer Lyuben Dilov Jr. has claimed that the protests are essentially a Sofia-based phenomenon, as the protesters have been unable to translate their messages into a language digestible to the wider masses of citizens outside the capital city, and also lack a unifying figure. The absence of a protest leader and a unified platform has also been identified as a weakness of the protests by sociologist Boryana Dimitrova who also stated that the protesters faced an uphill battle due to the pandemic situation, during which existential questions tend to push political ones out of the picture. Political scientist Ognyan Minchev stated in December 2020 that the wider society has so far been unable to produce a credible alternative to Borisov's party that could lead the country in a new direction, though he also indicated that this is just a temporary bonus for the government and by no means something for which the status quo deserves praise.

Academician and psychiatrist Drozdstoy Stoyanov posited that Borisov's quasi-totalitarian style of governing gave the general public a sense of predictability and certainty about tomorrow, similar to how many felt under the People's Republic of Bulgaria, which sense they craved like a narcotic. He further asserted that people didn't genuinely like Prime Minister Borisov, but the uneducated saw him as a father figure who is sympathetic to their hardships due to his image as a man of the people. Stoyanov concluded that the lack of intelligentsia in Bulgarian society contributed to Borisov's enduring positive image among the masses.

== Potential impacts on COVID-19 transmission ==
Medics and public figures have expressed concerns that the protests will contribute to a further rise in the number of infections due to the ongoing COVID-19 pandemic in Bulgaria, with actions such as loud speaking identified as significantly more likely to generate a higher number of virus-containing droplets. Infectiologist Atanas Mangarov, whose views have been criticized by many of his colleagues within the field of medicine, such as leading members of the National Operational Headquarters for the fight against the coronavirus in Bulgaria, has claimed that the protests could be potentially beneficial in the long-term due to herd immunity (acquired as a result of many young and low-risk protest participants catching the virus and recovering from it) bringing the pandemic to a halt. On 1 August 2020 a sharp increase in the number of positive tests for COVID-19 among police officers in Sofia was reported, though none of them were heavily symptomatic. As a result, the number of security personnel deployed at the protests was reduced and Radoslav Stoynev, head of the Security Police Department, urged that masks be worn outdoors as well. However, no increase in COVID-19 cases among the general population has been attributed to the protests and the number of active cases in Bulgaria was in decline from early August until mid to late September 2020. Todor Kantardzhiev, a prominent member of the National Operational Headquarters for the fight against the coronavirus in Bulgaria, claimed in September 2020 that the protests did not play a significant role in bringing about exponential spread in the country, though Asen Baltov, the director of Pirogov Hospital, identified them in January 2021 as one of a number of factors contributing to the strain that was put on the country's health services in the autumn. The protesters and their organizers have been criticized for not observing some of the pandemic-related protocols.

== See also ==
- 2013 Bulgarian protests against the first Borisov cabinet – a similar protest movement that overthrew Borisov's first government in 2013
- 2025 Bulgarian budget protests - related protests against the Governing GERB Party led by Gen Z activists
- 2020s in political history
- List of protests in the 21st century
- Protests over responses to the COVID-19 pandemic
