= Autonomous Workers' Confederation =

Bulgarian trade union

- Автономна Работническа Конфедерация
- Abbreviation: AWC
- Founded: May 20, 2019; 7 years ago
- Headquarters: Varna, Bulgaria
- Location: Bulgaria
- Key people: Mergul Hassan, president
- Website: avtonomna.com

The Autonomous Workers' Confederation (Bulgarian: Автономна Работническа Конфедерация, romanized: Avtonomna Rabotnicheska Konfederatsiya) is an independent autonomist and syndicalist trade union in Bulgaria. It is chaired by Mergul Hassan, a former employee of the Piccadilly supermarket chain.

The AWC is headquartered in the coastal city of Varna and claims to have large union sections in Bulgaria's major cities, specifically among the medical, arts and IT sectors, though it does not specify how many members its sectors and affiliates have.

== Structure and Goals ==
The union has no employees of its own, as it rejects business unionism and instead entirely relies on contributions of the members of its sectors to fulfil its goals.

Unlike other Bulgarian labour unions, such as the much larger and well-established Confederation of Independent Trade Unions of Bulgaria, the AWC rejects representation in the Tripartite commission between the Bulgarian government, labour unions and chambers of commerce.

Though it has expressed a rejection of union bureaucracy, it has nevertheless agreed to work with the country's more traditional labour unions in creating a "network of solidarity and cooperation between everyone involved in the struggle".

It has defined its key goals and objectives as:

- An immediate and "unsymbolic" increase in incomes (wages, pensions, state aid and child benefits)
- Lowering the retirement age and reforming the pension system
- Universal health care
- Free, secular and universal education
- Opposition to austerity, privatization, economic liberalization and deregulation
- Socialization of all public utilities, such as power, water, heating and transport

== History ==
=== Foundation ===
The union was created in May 2019 in Varna through the unification of several small and unregistered autonomist unions from Varna, Sofia, Plovdiv and Vidin.

During their founding conference, the AWC signed a cooperation agreement with the SAC Syndikalisterna. The agreement allowed for AWC members to receive union support from the SAC without having to take membership in either it, or any other Swedish labour union.

=== June 2020 protests ===
The AWC made its first publicised debut in June 2020, when it organized a protest of medical professionals. The protest was called against alleged repressions launched against a nurse that was reportedly fired from her position due to her activities in favour of labour unions during the COVID-19 pandemic in Bulgaria.

=== July 2020 protests ===
The AWC later joined the more general 2020–2021 Bulgarian protests against the government of Prime Minister Boyko Borisov. In a press release, the union claimed to have joined the protests to "cooperate in the removal of the GERB-United Patriots model from power", but also to create a "broad, independent and most importantly extra-parliamentary front of the working people".
