= KNSB =

KNSB may refer to:

- KNSB (FM), a radio station (91.1 FM) in Bettendorf, Iowa
- Royal Speed Skating Federation (Koninklijke Nederlandsche Schaatsenrijders Bond)
- The Royal Dutch Chess Federation (Dutch: Koninklijke Nederlandse Schaakbond - KNSB)
- The Confederation of Independent Trade Unions of Bulgaria, also known as KNSB
