= Confederation of Employers and Industrialists of Bulgaria =

Bulgarian Chamber of Commerce

- Конфедерация на Работодателите и Индустриалистите в България
- Founded: 2006
- Type: Chamber of Commerce
- Purpose: Business advocacy
- Location: Bulgaria
- Method: Business networking Media attention Political lobbying
- Members: 12,000 companies, trusts and individuals (Self-declared)
- Key people: Kiril Domuschiev, Chairman Evgenii Ivanov, Executive Director
- Website: https://krib.bg/

The Confederation of Employers and Industrialists of Bulgaria (CEIB/KRIB) (Bulgarian: Конфедерация на Работодателите и Индустриалистите в България) is a nationwide chamber of commerce dedicated to the furthering of the interests of employers and large businesses in the nation.

It claims to represent business interests that account for 3/4 of Bulgaria's GDP and national exports, defining itself as the "voice of Bulgarian business".

== History ==
KRIB was founded in the mid-2000s as a result of the merger of two associations - that of foreign investors and that of local businessmen. Its first chairman was Ivo Prokopiev, who presided over the company between 2006 and 2010. He was replaced by Ognyan Donev, who chaired the organization from 2010 to 2014.

Donev was accused of money laundering by the Bulgarian police, but remained as the chairman of the organization until his second mandate expired in 2014, whereupon he was replaced by Kiril Domuschiev.

== Positions ==
=== Taxation ===
KRIB advocates for fiscally conservative positions on the issue of taxation, strongly opposing the proposed introduction of progressive taxation in the country. Their position on this issue landed them in a conflict with Bulgarian President Rumen Radev, whose position of support for progressive taxation they rejected by stating that they would "not accept advice from a person that doesn't know the price of bread, having eaten in canteens his entire life."

=== Foreign Policy ===
In July 2020, KRIB highly praised former GERB Finance Minister Vladislav Goranov for what they dub to be his contribution towards Bulgarian membership in ERM II and his "historical achievements" in membership in the European Union and NATO.

=== Cybersecurity ===
In 2019, following a massive data breach in Bulgaria's tax authority, the National Revenue Agency, KRIB's Executive Director stated that a law should be drafted to protect large companies in particular from cybercrime, going on to say that small businesses such as hairdressers, beauty salons and dentists did not need such protection, as he opined that 'nobody was extorting them'.

=== COVID-19 ===
During the COVID-19 pandemic in Bulgaria, KRIB demanded that the government subsidise enterprises to offset the losses caused by the deadly pandemic. The government drafted a subsidy law, in which it would agree to take on 60% of the costs of workers' salaries, while the other 40% would remain paid from their own private budgets. KRIB then insisted that state support be increased either by altering the proportions to 80-20 or by subsidising social and health insurance as well.

KRIB joined forces with the DPS in drafting a law to alter the proposed subsidies according to its own proposal. For its part, the confederation issued a letter of gratitude to the DPS, stating its intention to continue their joint efforts to "save the Bulgarian economy". The ruling GERB party accepted the joint KRIB-DPS amendment and voted it into law shortly thereafter.

== Controversy ==
=== Oligarch connections, biases and internal splits ===
The Confederation is accused of undergoing a shift in policy after the ascention of Boyko Borisov to the country's premiership and Kiril Domuschiev as its own chairman. Critics lambast KRIB for having allegedly having turned into a "pro-governmental structure that only services the interests of those in power, its own chairman and a select elite of its members". According to Bulgarian financial publication "Kapital", KRIB began accepting as members companies linked to notable Bulgarian oligarchs and eventually turned into an organization heavily weighed towards only protecting the interests of large companies in the tobacco, alcohol and gambling industries.

Bulgaria's National Petrol Association, representing the interests of the fuel and gas industries, demonstratively left KRIB in January 2019, after the latter had joined the government in delaying the passage of a petrol law that the association had wanted passed. KRIB's Chairman reacted by stating that there was "no way [for his organization] to defend the interests of a handful of people [in the petrol industry]".

Meanwhile, businessman Plamen Bobokov, whose companies had been affiliated with KRIB, complained in June 2020 that the organization stood by idly as his companies were raided by the authorities after he was accused of texting the former Minister for the Environment in what the prosecution stated was a scheme to illegally import and recycle waste from abroad. Bobokov alleges that he did no such thing and that the raid was due to his refusal to affiliate himself with the ruling party.

==== Statements in support of Valery Simeonov ====
In 2018, the organization drew criticism after its defence of then-deputy Premier Valeri Simeonov. During a protest by The System Kills Us, an organization and movement of parents of children with serious disabilities, Simeonov refused concessions to the protesters, calling them "bitchy women" with "pretend-sick children". KRIB's Executive Director condemned the protesters, labeling their demands "absolutely illegitimate, extra-parliamentary and issued under illegitimate street pressure and social media abuse". He then pledged to "mobilize 20,000 people" in defence of Simeonov, stating that he would not allow the government to buck under popular pressure. Supermarket chain Lidl, which is a member of KRIB, strongly condemned the confederation's statement, adding that KRIB's leadership had not consulted with the organization's members at all before issuing the statements in support of Simeonov, which it stated it strongly opposes.

=== Suppression of protests ===
In early August 2020, during large-scale anti-government protests in the country, KRIB authored a letter to the Bulgarian government in which it asked the government to deploy police forces to remove protesters from roads across the country, as well as to restrict protests only to predefined select locations. The government did so a few days later, triggering praise from the confederation.
