= The System Kills Us =

Non-governmental organization

- Системата ни убива
- Black flag used by protesters as its symbol
- Formation: 18 April 2018; 6 years ago
- Founded at: Bulgaria
- Type: Protest movement and NGO
- Headquarters: Sofia, Bulgaria
- Fields: Disability rights advocacy
- Key people: Vera Ivanova
- Secessions: "The System Kills Us All"

The System Kills Us (Bulgarian: Системата ни убива, romanized: Sistemata ni ubiva) is the name of a Bulgarian protest movement and association of mothers and legal guardians of children with disabilities, campaigning for disability rights and state support for disabled people.

It uses a black flag, symbolizing death and mourning as its official symbol.

The movement's goals revolve around securing state subsidies for disabled people and their families, especially for family members put in charge of caring for their disabled children. According to it, around 77,000 people in Bulgaria are in need of state support in order to secure a decent living.

== History ==
=== Foundation ===
The movement was founded on 18 April 2018, amidst an informal protest in favour of state support for disabled people. The protest, which was the sixth such protest held that far, became the foundation of The System Kills Us as the demonstrators donned black shirts emblazoned with the movement's name.

=== April 2018 protests ===
On the 18 April protest, demonstrators went to meet with the opposition Bulgarian Socialist Party's leader - Korneliya Ninova. They were denied entry into the nation's National Assembly, by its government-appointed Deputy-Chairman Emil Hristov.

Shortly thereafter, the movement was endorsed by TV star Slavi Trifonov and subsequently drafted and created a Law for Personal Assistance, which they demanded the government sign. This caused the government's social minister to unexpectedly resign. Through negotiations, he was reappointed to his position within 24 hours, promising to work on three different laws to cater to the movement.

By October, the protest movement had the full support of the opposition socialists, which made the ruling GERB party begin negotiations with the system kills us, in order to avoid generating more opposition.

The government's finance minister Vladislav Goranov promised that all three proposed laws would be accepted. However, Vice-Premier Valeri Simeonov disagreed publicly with the concessions on national TV, calling the association's members "bitchy women" with "pretend-sick children". This triggered a tripling in the number of demonstrators at the movement's rallies, which in turn pressured the government into sacking Simeonov from his position on 16 November that same year.

Shortly thereafter, two laws were passed in concession - a law for personal aid and a disability law. However, the association remained disillusioned by a government decision to alter the qualifications for disability under the new laws and threatened further protests.

=== Split ===
During the 2018 protests, the protest movement slowly grew to be led by a woman by the name of Vera Ivanova. This led a group of other members to create a rival group with the same aims, dubbed The System Kills Us All. This new movement was formalized into a non-governmental organization on 10 December 2018, listing Maya Stoitseva as its leader.

=== May 2020 protests ===
In May 2020, the movement joined forces with Izpravise.BG, a 'civic platform' led by former Ombudswoman Maya Manolova to demand that the government adopt a plan to deal with the economic effects of the COVID-19 pandemic in Bulgaria. The two movements held joint protests in Sofia's city centre to this effect.

=== August 2020 protests ===
On 1 August 2020, The System Kills Us officially joined the 2020–2021 Bulgarian protests against the government of Prime Minister Boyko Borisov. They organized a march on PM Borisov's home in Bankya and later attempted to drive a van into Sofia's central square. The van was blocked from reaching its destination by police forces near Sofia University's rectorate building. System Kills Us' spokesperson stated that they would keep their protest routes a secret, as they feared retaliation from the ruling party's youth wing, alleging that the youth wing had threatened to lay nails and broken glass on the road in order to pop the tyres of their vehicles, so that they wouldn't "disturb the prime minister". The government's Social Affairs Minister reacted by dubbing their protest a "political provocation". A few days later, police forces initiated a crackdown on the anti-government protesters. Amid the police sweep, the organization's van was seized and impounded, while its legal owner was fined.
