= Piccadilly (supermarket chain) =

Bulgarian supermarket chain

- Industry: Retail
- Founded: 1995
- Defunct: 2017
- Headquarters: Bulgaria
- Website: www.piccadilly.bg

Piccadilly (Пикадили) is a former Bulgarian supermarket chain operating in Varna and Sofia. Founded as a 51% foreign-owned company in 1995, it opened its first supermarket in Varna in 1994 and became 100% Bulgarian-owned in 2003. Piccadilly was known for its near-complete dominance of the market in Varna to the extent that it prevented large international chains such as Billa from opening new stores.

A loyalty program, Piccadilly Club, was started in 2003. On 12 September 2007 the Serbian firm "Delta Holding" bought 85% of the Piccadilly Chain Supermarket. Under this deal, Delta had to invest about €70m in Piccadilly and open 20 new stores which would hire about 1000 new employees. That was the first deal in which the Serbian capital was invested in an EU member state. Through the acquisition of Delta Maxi Group in July 2011, Piccadilly became a member of the Belgian international food retailer Delhaize Group. The chain disposed of 26 Piccadilly supermarkets (eight of them on the territory of Varna, five in Sofia, three in Plovdiv, one in Burgas, one in Veliko Tarnovo, one in Lovech, one in Stara Zagora, one in Vidin, one in Samokov, one in Yambol, one in Gabrovo and one in Rousse) and 13 Piccadilly Express corner shops (ten in Sofia, two in Plovdiv and one in Varna). In 2014 the chain was once again sold by Delhaize to the Bulgarian company AP Mart and the company decided to merge the Piccadilly stores chain with the Carrefour Market operated by KMB Bulgaria franchiser. But the deal never happened. In 2015, Piccadilly took a €11.8m loan from Investbank to repay its suppliers and lenders.

As of 2017, the company operates six supermarkets in Varna and seven in Sofia.

Since 17 February 2017 Piccadilly is in administration due to €80m of indebtedness towards its lenders, suppliers, staff and the state.
