= Vladislav Goranov =

Bulgarian politician

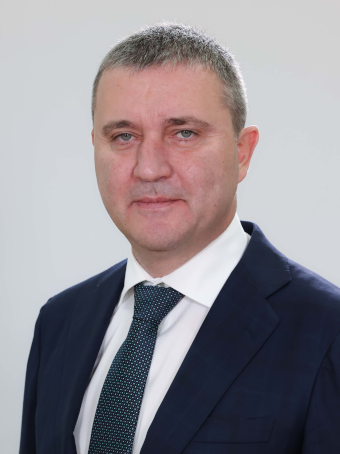
- Goranov in 2026

Minister of Finance
- In office 4 May 2017 – 24 July 2020
- Prime Minister: Boyko Borisov
- Preceded by: Kiril Ananiev
- Succeeded by: Kiril Ananiev
- In office 7 November 2014 – 27 January 2017
- Prime Minister: Boyko Borisov
- Preceded by: Rumen Porozhanov
- Succeeded by: Kiril Ananiev

Personal details
- Born: 30 April 1977 (age 49) Pleven, Bulgaria
- Party: Citizens for European Development
- Education: Tsenov Academy of Economics

Vladislav Ivanov Goranov (Bulgarian: Владислав Иванов Горанов) (born 30 April 1977) is a Bulgarian economist and politician, who served as Minister of Finance of the Republic of Bulgaria until late July 2020. In February 2023 Goranov was sanctioned by the US government for his extensive involvement in corruption in Bulgaria.

== Biography ==
Vladislav Goranov was born on 30 April 1977 in Pleven. He was a deputy finance minister in Boyko Borissov’s first government and a member of Parliament in the 42nd National Assembly and Minister of Finance (2014 – 2017) in Boyko Borissov‘s second government. Since 4 May 2017, he has again been a Minister of Finance of the Republic of Bulgaria in the government of political party Citizens for European Development of Bulgaria and the party of the United Patriots (from the former party’s quote). Goranov studied in the School of Mathematics “Geo Milev” in Pleven. In the period between 1994 and 1999 he graduated in economics from the Economic academy “Dimitar Apostolov Tsenov” in the city of Svishtov. His master's degree is in accountancy and control. Following this, he commenced his career in the government. He also possesses a doctoral degree from the University of National and World Economy, department “Human Resources and Social Protection”.

He is married, with two children.

Professional experience

From 1998 until 2001, he was a specialist in “Out-of-budget accounts and funds”, expert and director of department “Financial policy” at the Ministry of agriculture, forestry and agricultural reform. In 2001 he occupied the position of a chief expert in department “Financing of state bodies, programmes and security funds” at the Ministry of Finance. From 2001 until 2009, he was a head of unit “Social expenses” at the Ministry of Finance, department “Management of the public finances”.

As of August 2009 until April 2013, he occupied the position of a deputy minister of finances. He was a member of Parliament in the 42nd National Assembly which he left voluntarily in February 2014. Subsequently, he was appointed as an executive director and member of the board of directors of Municipal Bank.

Between November 2014 and January 2017, he was a minister of finance of the Republic of Bulgaria. After a short absence, in May 2017, he was appointed again as a minister of finance. In his ministerial capacity, he is also a member of the board of governors at the European Investment Bank as of 17 May 2017. During the first Bulgarian Presidency of the Council of EU in the first half of 2018, Goranov was the first Bulgarian Finance minister to preside the Economic and Financial Council (Ecofin).

== Apartmentgate 2018 ==
A 2018 media story alleged that then-finance minister Goranov was living in a luxury apartment rent-free, provided by a businessman who was the beneficiary of public procurement contracts. The media story prompted an investigation by Bulgaria's anti-corruption body. The body eventually found no clear evidence of corruption under Bulgarian law, as the contracts were awarded by other ministries.

== Allegations of corruption in gambling commission ==
In May 2020, the main private gambling operation in Bulgaria published screenshots of text messages allegedly exchanged with Goranov. These messages suggested that finance minister Goranov intervened with the State Gambling Commission—which reports to the Ministry of Finance—and advised its chairpersons to avoid disrupting private businesses in exchange for bribes.

The Anti-Corruption Fund forwarded those messages to Bulgaria's Prosecutor General, highlighting possible collusion or undue political influence in favor of private gambling enterprises against large sums of money.

== Systemic corruption ==
Bulgaria's Anti-Corruption Fund asserted that between 2017 and 2019, a gambling sector businessman transferred approximately 60 million BGN (~€30 million) to Goranov in exchange for beneficial treatment and favorable legislation. This claim triggered a criminal investigation, and in March 2022, Goranov was briefly detained related to allegations of blackmail and systemic corruption.

In February 2023, the U.S. Treasury officially sanctioned Vladislav Goranov under the Global Magnitsky Act for his role in a corruption scheme. He was accused of using his position as Finance Minister to facilitate bribery, enabling favorable legislation that deprived the state of tax revenues and delivered tens of millions of euros to oligarchs in the gambling industry. Goranov is one of only two former finance ministers worldwide sanctioned under the Magnitsky Act, the other being former Lebanese minister Ali Hassan Khalil.

In 2024, the European Public Prosecutor's Office said it was working on allegations of “Systemic corruption against senior public officials,” including former Finance Minister Vladislav Goranov.

== See also ==
- bg:Владислав Горанов Bulgarian Wikipedia article
