= Confederation of Independent Trade Unions of Bulgaria =

Trade union confederation in Bulgaria

KNSB/CITUB
- Confederation of Independent Trade Unions of Bulgaria
- Конфедерация на независимите синдикати в България
- Founded: 18 February 1990
- Headquarters: Sofia, Bulgaria
- Location: Bulgaria
- Members: 290,000
- Key people: Plamen Dimitrov, president
- Affiliations: ITUC, ETUC
- Website: www.knbs-bg.org
- former president: Krustyo Petkov 1990–1997, Jeliazko Hristov 1997–2010

The Confederation of Independent Trade Unions of Bulgaria (KNSB/CITUB; Bulgarian: Конфедерация на независимите синдикати в България, romanized: Konfederatsiya na nezavisimite sindikati v Balgariya) is a trade union confederation in Bulgaria. The CITUB is Bulgaria's largest, most influential and well-established trade union, having several times more members than its largest rival - KT Podkrepa.

The KNSB is affiliated with the International Trade Union Confederation and the European Trade Union Confederation.

In addition to its unionist activities, the CITUB also has a research department dubbed the Institute for Social and Syndicalist Studies, which analyzes social and economic issues, conducts polls and publishes informational bulletins.

== History ==
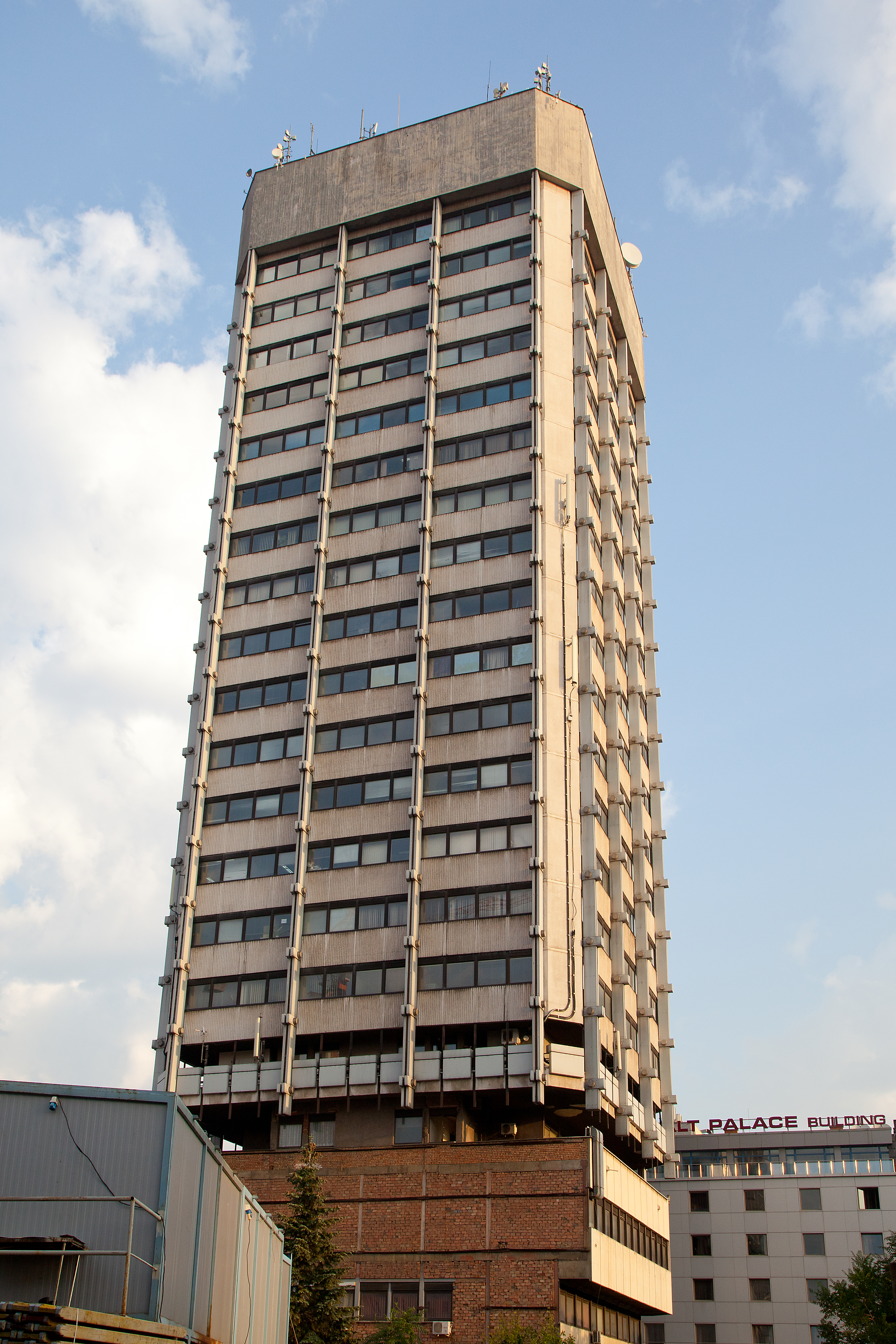
CITUB's headquarters, the former socialist-era Trade Unions Building

=== Foundation and Heritage ===
The CITUB considers itself to be the "inheritor of a 140-year history of the labour movement" in the country.

In its modern form, CITUB was formed as a result of a reorganization of the Socialist era Central Council of Trade Unions (CCTU) during an extraordinary congress in February 1990.

The CCTU itself was founded in 1945 as a replacement for the Tsarist era Bulgarian Workers Union, which existed between 1935 and 1944 and was formed by the royalist government after it had banned all other trade unions in the country.

=== Trade Union Rivalry ===
The CITUB has historically been a rival of KT Podkrepa since both unions' inceptions, as the CITUB emerged from the pro-communist labour union centre in 1990, while its rival Podkrepa emerged from dissident groups closer to the SDS and DPS, immediately drawing the two groups into opposing camps.

Though CITUB was immediately more influential, its membership dwarfing that of Podkrepa at a ratio of nearly 10:1, Podkrepa would go on to become a constituent member of the SDS once it became a legal organization. The CITUB on the other hand would remain staffed with many socialists and communists among its ranks. Because of this, CITUB would then be criticised from the right for being too closely linked to the Bulgarian Socialist Party (the political heir to the Bulgarian Communist Party), while at the same time criticised from the left for being too aggressively reformist.

It initially refused to take part in strikes against the government of Andrey Lukanov, a former communist turned social democrat, though it would eventually criticise Lukanov's government for its inaction toward labour rights and join the strikes against his government shortly thereafter, contributing to the fall of Lukanov's government.

Conversely, Podkrepa would come under criticism for its right-wing policies and membership in the SDS, leading Podkrepa's leader to downgrade his union's status in the SDS from that of full member to that of an observer.

Despite their rivalry, the two unions later grew to work together and eventually both came to support the Socialist Party's government between 2005 and 2009, though relations had begun to deteriorate toward the end of the mandate and both unions have since become critical of all political parties.

Though the two unions have since cooperated on several issues, Podkrepa has refused to support the CITUB's calls for higher wages and the two unions have refused to hold International Workers' Day celebrations together.
