= List of political parties in Bulgaria =

Bulgaria has a multi-party system, with numerous parties in which no single party usually manages to gain power alone, and parties must work with each other to form coalition governments.

== Parliamentary parties ==
Party/alliance		Abbr.	Leader(s)	Ideology	National Assembly	MEPs	Political position	EU
Progressive Bulgaria; Прогресивна България		PB; ПБ	Rumen Radev	Left-wing populism; Social democracy; Social conservatism; Soft Euroscepticism	131 / 240	0 / 17	Centre-left to left-wing	—N/a
GERB– SDS; ГЕРБ–СДС	Citizens for European Development of Bulgaria; Граждани за европейско развитие на България	GERB; ГЕРБ	Boyko Borissov	Conservatism; Populism; Pro-Europeanism	39 / 240	4 / 17	Centre-right	EPP
GERB– SDS; ГЕРБ–СДС	Union of Democratic Forces; Съюз на демократичните сили	SDS; СДС	Boyko Borissov	Conservatism; Populism; Pro-Europeanism	0 / 240	1 / 17	Centre-right	EPP
PP–DB; ПП–ДБ	We Continue the Change; Продължаваме промяната	PP; ПП	Kiril Petkov; Assen Vassilev; Hristo Ivanov; Atanas Atanasov	Liberalism; Pro-Europeanism	16 / 240	2 / 17	Centre to centre-right	ALDE
PP–DB; ПП–ДБ	Yes, Bulgaria! Да, България!	DB; ДБ	Kiril Petkov; Assen Vassilev; Hristo Ivanov; Atanas Atanasov	Liberalism; Pro-Europeanism	12 / 240	0 / 17	Centre to centre-right	ALDE
PP–DB; ПП–ДБ	Democrats for a Strong Bulgaria; Демократи за силна България	DSB; ДСБ	Kiril Petkov; Assen Vassilev; Hristo Ivanov; Atanas Atanasov	Liberalism; Pro-Europeanism	8 / 240	1 / 17	Centre to centre-right	ALDE
Movement for Rights and Freedoms; Движение за права и свободи		DPS; ДПС	Delyan Peevski	Liberalism; Turkish interests; Pro-Europeanism	21 / 240	2 / 17	Centre	—N/a
Revival; Възраждане			Kostadin Kostadinov	Ultranationalism; Right-wing populism; Russophilia; Hard Euroscepticism	12 / 240	3 / 17	Far-right	ESN
BSP; БСП	Bulgarian Socialist Party; Българска социалистическа партия	BSP; БСП	Atanas Zafirov	Social democracy; Democratic socialism; Left-wing populism; Social conservatism	0 / 240	2 / 17	Centre-left to left-wing	PES
BSP; БСП	Ecoglasnost; Екогласност		Atanas Zafirov	Social democracy; Democratic socialism; Left-wing populism; Social conservatism	0 / 240	2 / 17	Centre-left to left-wing	PES
BSP; БСП	Political Club "Trakiya"; Политически клуб „Тракия“	PKT; ПКТ	Atanas Zafirov	Social democracy; Democratic socialism; Left-wing populism; Social conservatism	0 / 240	2 / 17	Centre-left to left-wing	PES
BSP; БСП	Alternative for Bulgarian Revival; Алтернатива за българско възраждане	ABV; АБВ	Atanas Zafirov	Social democracy; Democratic socialism; Left-wing populism; Social conservatism	0 / 240	2 / 17	Centre-left to left-wing	PES
BSP; БСП	Political Movement "Social Democrats"; Политическо движение „Социалдемократи“	PDS; ПДС	Atanas Zafirov	Social democracy; Democratic socialism; Left-wing populism; Social conservatism	0 / 240	2 / 17	Centre-left to left-wing	PES
BSP; БСП	Bulgarian Social Democracy – EuroLeft; Българска социалдемокрация – Евролевица	BSDE; БСДЕ	Atanas Zafirov	Social democracy; Democratic socialism; Left-wing populism; Social conservatism	0 / 240	2 / 17	Centre-left to left-wing	PES
BSP; БСП	Communist Party of Bulgaria; Комунистическа Партия на България	CPB; КПБ	Atanas Zafirov	Social democracy; Democratic socialism; Left-wing populism; Social conservatism	0 / 240	2 / 17	Centre-left to left-wing	PES
BSP; БСП	Movement for Social Humanism; Движение за социален хуманизъм	DSH; ДСХ	Atanas Zafirov	Social democracy; Democratic socialism; Left-wing populism; Social conservatism	0 / 240	2 / 17	Centre-left to left-wing	PES
BSP; БСП	European Security and Integration; Европейска сигурност и интеграция	ESI; ЕСИ	Atanas Zafirov	Social democracy; Democratic socialism; Left-wing populism; Social conservatism	0 / 240	2 / 17	Centre-left to left-wing	PES
BSP; БСП	Union for the Fatherland; Съюз за отечеството	SO; СО	Atanas Zafirov	Social democracy; Democratic socialism; Left-wing populism; Social conservatism	0 / 240	2 / 17	Centre-left to left-wing	PES
BSP; БСП	Rise; Подем		Atanas Zafirov	Social democracy; Democratic socialism; Left-wing populism; Social conservatism	0 / 240	2 / 17	Centre-left to left-wing	PES
APS; AПС	Just Bulgaria United Patriots; Справедлива България – обединени родолюбци	SBOR; СБОР	Hayri Sadakov	Liberalism; Turkish interests	0 / 240	1 / 17	Centre	ALDE
APS; AПС	Agrarian People's Union; Земеделски народен съюз	ZNS; ЗНС	Hayri Sadakov	Liberalism; Turkish interests	0 / 240	1 / 17	Centre	ALDE
There is Such a People; Има такъв народ		ITN; ИТН	Slavi Trifonov	Populism; Social conservatism	0 / 240	1 / 17	Right-wing	ECR
Morality, Unity, Honour; Морал, Единство, Чест		MECh; МЕЧ	Radostin Vassilev	Right-wing populism; Social conservatism	0 / 240	0 / 17	Far-right	—N/a
Velichie; Величие			Ivelin Mihaylov	Bulgarian nationalism; Populism	0 / 240	0 / 17	Far-right	—N/a

=== Parties/coalitions outside the parliament but participating in the election ===
- Attack (Атака)
- Blue Bulgaria (Синя България)
  - Conservative Union of the Right (Консервативен съюз на десницата)
  - Bulgarian Democratic Forum (Български демократически форум)
  - Democratic Action Movement (Движение демократично действие)
  - Conservative Bulgaria (Консервативна България)
  - Radical Democratic Party (Радикалдемократическа партия)
  - Bulgarian New Democracy (Българска Нова Демокрация)
  - United Agrarians (Обединени земеделци)
- Brigade (Бригада)
- Bulgaria of Labor and Reason (България на труда и разума)
- Bulgarian National Unification (Българско национално обединение)
- Bulgarian National Union – New Democracy (Български национален съюз - Нова демокрация)
- Bulgarian Rise (Български възход)
- Bulgarian Union for Direct Democracy (Български съюз за пряка демокрация)
- Competence, Responsibility and Truth (компетентност, отговорност и истина)
- Democrats for Responsibility, Solidarity and Tolerance (Демократи за отговорност, свобода и толерантност)
- Direct Democracy (Пряка демокрация)
- Free Voters (Свободни избиратели)
  - Green Union (Зелен съюз)
  - Republicans for Bulgaria (Републиканци за България)
  - Union of Free Democrats (Съюз на свободните демократи)
- My Country Bulgaria (Моя страна България)
  - Bulgarian Left (Българска левица)
  - United Social Democracy (Обединена социалдемокрация)
- Party of the Greens (Партия на зелените)
- People's Party "Truth and Only the Truth" (Народна партия “Истината и само истината”)
- People's Voice (Глас народен)
- Pravoto (Правото)
- Progressive Bulgaria (Progresivna Bŭlgariya)
- Russophiles for Bulgaria (Русофили за България)
  - Party of the Bulgarian Communists (Партия на Българските комунисти,)
  - Bulgarian Communist Party (Българска комунистическа партия)
  - Russophiles for the Revival of the Fatherland (Русофили за възраждане на Отечеството)
- Socialist Party "Bulgarian Way" (Социалистическа партия “Български път”)

=== Other parties/coalitions ===
- Agrarian Union "Aleksandar Stamboliyski” (Земеделски съюз „Александър Стамболийски“)
- Bulgaria for Citizens (Движение „България на гражданите“)
- Bulgarian Agrarian National Union (Български земеделски народен съюз)
- Bulgarian Democratic Center (Български Демократичен Център)
- Bulgarian Democratic Party for European and World States (Българска демократическа партия за европейски и световни държави)
- Bulgarian Democratic Union-Radicals (Български демократичен съюз „Радикали)
- Bulgarian Neoconservative Party (Българска неоконсервативна партия )
- Bulgarian Progressive Line (Българска прогресивна линия)
- Bulgarian Social Democratic Party (Българска социалдемократическа партия)
- Bulgarian Summer (Българско лято)
- Bulgarian Workers and Peasants Party (Българска работническо-селска партия)
- Bulgarian Workers' Party/Communists/ (Българска работническа партия /комунисти/)
- Bulgarian Workers-Peasant Party (Българска работническо-селска партия)
- Bulgarian Workers Socialist Party (Българска работническа социалистическа партия)
- Che Guevara Movement (Че Гевара (организация))
- Democratic Party (Демократическа партия)
- Entire Bulgaria (Цяла България)
- For a Great Bulgaria (За Велика България)
- George's Day Movement (Движение Гергьовден)
- Green Movement (Зелено движение)
- Green Party of Bulgaria (Зелена партия на България)
- IMRO – Bulgarian National Movement (ВМРО – Българско Национално Движение)
- Left Alternative (Лявата алтернатива)
- Morality, Initiative and Patriotism (Морал, Инициативност, Родолюбие)
- Movement for an Equal Public Model (Движение за равноправен обществен модел)
- Nation (Нация)
- National Democratic Party (Българското национално-демократическа партия)
- National Movement for Stability and Progress (Национално движение за стабилност и възход)
- National Movement for the Salvation of the Fatherland (Национално движение за спасение на Отечеството)
- New Time (Ново време )
- New Zora (Нова Зора)
- Normal State (Нормална държава)
- Party of Bulgarian Women (Партия на българските жени)
- Patriotism 2000 (Родолюбие 2000)
- Resistance Movement "23rd September" Bulgaria (Съпротивително движение “23 септември” България)
- Society for a New Bulgaria (Общество за нова България)
- The Poisonous Trio (Отровното трио)
- Union of Communists in Bulgaria (Съюз на Комунистите в България)
- Union of Patriotic Forces and Militaries of the Reserve Defense (Съюз на патриотичните сили и военните от резерва "Защита")
- United Block of Labour (Обединен блок на труда)
- United People's Party (Единна народна партия)
- Volt Bulgaria (Волт България)
- Volya Movement (Движение Воля)
- We Are Coming (Ние идваме)

=== Defunct parties ===
- Bulgarian Communist Party (Българска комунистическа партия)
- Bulgarian Agrarian People's Union “Nikola Petkov” (Български земеделски народен съюз „Никола Петков“)
- Bulgarian Agrarian People's Union - United (Български земеделски народен съюз - Обединено)
- Bulgarian Business Bloc (Български бизнес блок)
- Bulgarian Democratic-Constitutional Party (Българска демократ-конституционна партия)
- Bulgarian Euroright (Българска евродесница)
- Bulgarian Social Democratic Workers' Party (Broad Socialists) (Българска работническа социалдемократическа партия (широки социалисти))
- Bulgarian Patriots (Български патриоти)
- Fatherland Front (Отечествен фронт)
- Nationalist Party of Bulgaria (Националистическа партия на България)
- United Democratic Forces (Обединени Демократични Сили)
- United Patriots (Обединени Патриоти)

== See also ==
- Lists of political parties
- Liberalism and radicalism in Bulgaria
