= 2023 Bulgarian parliamentary election =

- 2 April 2023
- All 240 seats in the 49th National Assembly; 121 seats needed for a majority
- Turnout: 40.51% (▲1.21pp)
Party	Leader	Vote %	Seats	+/–
GERB—SDS	Boyko Borisov	25.39	69	+2
PP–DB	Kiril Petkov	23.54	64	−9
Revival	Kostadin Kostadinov	13.58	37	+10
DPS	Mustafa Karadayi	13.18	36	0
BSPzB	Korneliya Ninova	8.56	23	−2
ITN	Slavi Trifonov	3.94	11	+11
This lists parties that won seats. See the complete results below.
Prime Minister before	Prime Minister after
Galab Donev (caretaker); Independent (Second Donev Government)	Nikolai Denkov; PP (Denkov Government)

Early parliamentary elections were held in Bulgaria on 2 April 2023 to elect members of the National Assembly. These were initially scheduled to be held before November 2026; however, as no government was approved by the 48th Parliament, Bulgarian President Rumen Radev announced in January 2023 that he would call a snap election. The GERB—SDS placed first with 69 seats, closely followed by PP–DB which won 64. Tied for third was the far-right Revival and the minority interests party DPS, with 37 and 36 seats, respectively. ITN also entered the parliament after having fallen out in the 2022 election.

On 15 May President Rumen Radev granted GERB—SDS a mandate to form a government, and the party nominated Bulgaria's European Commissioner, Mariya Gabriel, for prime minister. GERB—SDS sought to form a government with rival PP–DB to end the political deadlock that had resulted in numerous inconclusive elections. Although initially reluctant, with co-leader and former prime minister Kiril Petkov pledging to rule out working with GERB—SDS, the PP–DB later agreed to negotiate; however, the talks between the two parties broke down on 27 May after the leak of a video in which the leaders of the PP–DB expressed their intentions to reduce GERB—SDS' influence within the civil service.

President Radev subsequently handed a mandate on 29 May to the PP–DB to form a government, which nominated Nikolai Denkov for prime minister. Radev recommended Denkov return the mandate due to the video's release, which sparked protests and criticism from PP–DB, arguing the president’s statement was unconstitutional. GERB—SDS agreed to restart negotiations with PP–DB to form a "government of experts." Denkov announced on 2 June that the two parties had reached an agreement on the composition of a cabinet with certain modifications that removed "inflammatory political figures". Parliament voted to approve the new GERB—SDS–PP–DB government on 6 June with Denkov as prime minister.

== Background ==
The National Assembly remained fragmented following the 2022 election, the third snap election since 2021, and no party was able to form a governing coalition. GERB and the Movement for Rights and Freedoms (DPS) did not have a majority, holding only 103 of the 121 seats needed. Bulgarian Rise (BV) and Revival, which held a combined 39 seats, are considered Eurosceptic and sympathetic to Russia, similarly to the Bulgarian Socialist Party (BSP) with 25 seats. Although generally pro-EU, the remaining parties and alliances with seats opposed Boyko Borisov's past government and refused any possibility of a coalition with GERB due to disagreements over corruption.

On 18 October Borisov announced that his attempts to broker a coalition government prior to the first sitting of the new Assembly were unsuccessful. The following day, the Assembly failed to elect a speaker during its first meeting, the first time this ever occurred. After multiple failed attempts, the Assembly elected its oldest member, the GERB MP Vezhdi Rashidov, as speaker on 21 October, after he was nominated by Korneliya Ninova, the leader of BSP, as a consensus candidate. The gridlock to form a new government persisted throughout October and November 2022 and before a first or second mandate was given, President Rumen Radev stated that he would delay handing over the third mandate for government formation until after the New Year so as to delay elections until March 2023 and avoid the most difficult winter period.

On 2 December, Radev stated that he would hand the government mandate to the election's winner GERB the following Monday. On 5 December, Radev granted the first mandate to GERB's nominee, Nikolay Gabrovski. One week later, on 12 December, Gabrovski proposed a new government. His prime ministership was rejected by Parliament (113 for, 125 against, 2 absent) two days later on 14 December, with MPs from the DPS and BV voting in favour alongside GERB. On 3 January, Radev gave the second mandate to PP's candidate, Nikolai Denkov, but his prime ministership was also rejected by Parliament (63 for, 84 against, 30 abstain, 63 absent). Radev gave the third mandate to Ninova, who was unable to form a government in a deadlocked parliament. As none of the three mandates produced a government, a new election was scheduled.

== Electoral system ==
The 240 members of the National Assembly are elected by open list, proportional representation from 31 multi-member constituencies ranging in size from 4 to 19 seats. The electoral threshold is 4% for parties, with seats allocated according to the largest remainder method using a Hare quota. Radev dissolved the National Assembly on 3 February to schedule the election for 2 April 2023.

== Parties ==
=== Parliamentary parties ===
The table below lists the political party groups that were represented in the 48th National Assembly prior to the election.

Name		Ideology	Position	Leader(s)	2022 result		Seats at dissolution
Name		Ideology	Position	Leader(s)	Votes (%)	Seats	Seats at dissolution
GERB—SDS	GERB—Union of Democratic Forces	Conservatism	Centre-right	Boyko Borisov	24.48%	67 / 240	67 / 240
PP–DB	We Continue the Change–Democratic Bulgaria	Social liberalism Anti-corruption	Centre	Kiril Petkov; Assen Vassilev	19.52%	53 / 240	74 / 240
PP–DB	We Continue the Change–Democratic Bulgaria	Liberalism	Centre to centre-right	Hristo Ivanov; Atanas Atanasov	7.19%	20 / 240	74 / 240
DPS	Movement for Rights and Freedoms	Turkish minority interests Liberalism	Centre	Mustafa Karadayi	13.29%	36 / 240	36 / 240
Revival	Revival	Ultranationalism Right-wing populism	Far-right	Kostadin Kostadinov	9.83%	27 / 240	27 / 240
BSPzB	BSP for Bulgaria	Social democracy Social conservatism	Centre-left	Korneliya Ninova	8.98%	25 / 240	24 / 240
BV	Bulgarian Rise	National conservatism Souverainism	Right-wing	Stefan Yanev	4.47%	12 / 240	12 / 240

=== Contesting parties and coalitions ===
Coalitions that registered to take part in the 2023 parliamentary election could change its composition or name by 25 February 2023. Until 28 February 2023, the candidate lists could be registered to the Electoral Commission.

#	Party or coalition			Ideology	Leader	2022 result	
#	Party or coalition			Ideology	Leader	Votes (%)	Seats
1	BSP for Bulgaria	BSP	Bulgarian Socialist Party	Social democracy Social conservatism	Korneliya Ninova	8.98%	25 / 240
1	BSP for Bulgaria	–	Ecoglasnost	Green politics Environmentalism	Emil Georgiev	8.98%	25 / 240
1	BSP for Bulgaria	Trakiya	Trakiya Political Club	Bulgarian nationalism Thracian Bulgarian interests	Stefan Nachev	8.98%	25 / 240
2	GERB—SDS	GERB	GERB	Conservatism; Populism	Boyko Borisov	24.48%	67 / 240
2	GERB—SDS	SDS	Union of Democratic Forces	National conservatism Christian democracy	Rumen Hristov	24.48%	67 / 240
3	Revival		Revival	Ultranationalism; Right-wing populism	Kostadin Kostadinov	9.83%	27 / 240
4	ITN		There is Such a People	Populism; Social conservatism	Slavi Trifonov	3.71%	0 / 240
5	ISI		People's Party "Truth and Only the Truth"	Anti-vaccination; Ultranationalism	Ventsislav Angelov	0.10%	0 / 240
6	Neutral Bulgaria	RVO	Russophiles for the Revival of the Fatherland	Russophilia; National conservatism	Nikolay Malinov	0.25%	0 / 240
6	Neutral Bulgaria	Ataka	Attack	Ultranationalism; Right-wing populism	Volen Siderov	0.29%	0 / 240
6	Neutral Bulgaria	BKP	Bulgarian Communist Party	Communism; Left-wing nationalism	Zonka Spasova	DNP	
6	Neutral Bulgaria	PBK	Party of the Bulgarian Communists	Communism; Marxism–Leninism	Collective leadership	DNP	
7	BNO		Bulgarian National Unification	Bulgarian nationalism National conservatism	Georgi Georgiev-Goti	0.06%	0 / 240
8	Together (Bulgaria)	PnZ	Party of the Greens	Green politics Anti-capitalism	Vladimir Nikolov	(Bulgarian Rise)	
8	Together (Bulgaria)	SDP	Social Democratic Party (Bulgaria)	Social democracy Pro-Europeanism	Todor Barbolov	DNP	
8	Together (Bulgaria)	SBOR	A Just Bulgaria – United Patriots		Iva Miteva; Dimitar Iliev	New	
8	Together (Bulgaria)	DNK	Movement of Non-Partisan Candidates	Direct democracy	Mincho Hristov	0.40%	0 / 240
9	BNU-ND		Bulgarian National Union – New Democracy	Ultranationalism; Anti-immigration	Boyan Rasate	0.07%	0 / 240
10	NDSV		National Movement for Stability and Progress	Populism; Conservative liberalism	Stanimir Ilchev	DNP	
11	KOD		Conservative Union of the Right	National conservatism Right-wing populism	Petar Moskov	0.19%	0 / 240
12	PP–DB	PP	We Continue the Change	Liberalism; Anti-corruption	Kiril Petkov; Assen Vassilev	19.52%	53 / 240
12	PP–DB	SEK	Middle European Class	Economic liberalism Burgas regionalism	Konstantin Bachiiski	19.52%	53 / 240
12	PP–DB	Volt	Volt Bulgaria	European federalism Pro-Europeanism	Nastimir Ananiev	19.52%	53 / 240
12	PP–DB	DSB	Democrats for a Strong Bulgaria	Conservatism; Anti-communism	Atanas Atanasov	7.19% (DB)	20 / 240
12	PP–DB	DB	Yes, Bulgaria!	Liberalism; Anti-corruption	Hristo Ivanov	7.19% (DB)	20 / 240
12	PP–DB	ZD	Green Movement	Green politics Green liberalism	Vladislav Panev; Dobromira Kostova	7.19% (DB)	20 / 240
13	DPS		Movement for Rights and Freedoms	Turkish minority interests Liberalism	Mustafa Karadayi	13.29%	36 / 240
14	The Left!	IS.BG	Stand Up.BG	Social liberalism Social democracy	Maya Manolova	0.97%	0 / 240
14	The Left!	ABV	Alternative for Bulgarian Revival	Social democracy Moderate social conservatism	Rumen Petkov	(Bulgarian Rise)	
14	The Left!	ex-BSP faction		Social democracy	Valeri Zhablyanov	(BSPzB)	
14	The Left!	D21	Movement 21	Social democracy	Tatyana Doncheva	DNP	
14	The Left!	ZS-AS	Agrarian Union "Aleksandar Stamboliyski"	Agrarianism	Spas Panchev	DNP	
14	The Left!	BNL	Bulgarian Progressive Line	Democratic socialism	Krasimir Yankov	DNP	
14	The Left!	ND	Normal State	Progressivism	Georgi Kadiev	DNP	
15	BV		Bulgarian Rise	National conservatism Souverainism	Stefan Yanev	4.62%	12 / 240
16	MIR		MIR	Social conservatism	Simeon Slavchev	0.17%	0 / 240
17	BSDE		Bulgarian Social Democracy – EuroLeft	Social democracy Pro-Europeanism	Aleksandar Tomov	0.21%	0 / 240
18	BSDD		Bulgarian Union for Direct Democracy	Direct democracy	Georgi Nedelchev	0.23%	0 / 240
19	GN		People's Voice	Populism; Euroscepticism	Svetoslav Vitkov	0.24%	0 / 240
20	SPBP		Socialist Party "Bulgarian Way"	Left-wing nationalism Euroscepticism	Angel Dimov	DNP	
21	Out of EU and NATO	BTR	Bulgaria of Labor and Reason	Anti-Western sentiment Hard Euroscepticism	Georgi Manolov	0.10%	0 / 240
21	Out of EU and NATO	KOY	Competence, Responsibility and Truth		Svetozar Saev	(A Just Bulgaria)	
21	Out of EU and NATO	Natsiya	Nation (Bulgarian political party)	Ultranationalism; Hard Euroscepticism	Kiril Gumnerov	New	

== Campaign ==
=== Campaign slogans ===
The following list present the official campaign slogans of some of the major parties that contested the 2023 Bulgarian parliamentary election:

Party/alliance	Original slogan	English translation	Ref.
GERB–SDS	„За стабилна България отново“	"For a stable Bulgaria again"	
PP–DB	„Има как и има кой“	"There is a way and there is an option"	
DPS	„Разум, отговорност, диалог“	"Reason, Responsibility, Dialogue"	
Revival	„Избери свобода“	"Choose freedom"	
BSPzB	„Благоденствие, солидарност, прогрес“	"Prosperity, Solidarity, Progress"	
BV	„С разум за България”	"With reason for Bulgaria"	
ITN	„Държавата - Това сте вие“	"You are the state"	

=== Constitutional powers of the President ===
PP, DB, and GERB have accused Radev of meddling in political affairs, as well as internal party politics, which is in breach of the constitutional duties. BSP have consistently accused Radev and the caretaker Second Donev Government of allegedly meddling in internal party affairs. BSP sent an official complain to the OSCE and PACE alleging illegal meddling by the caretaker government and president in their internal politics, as well as the election campaign after an interview by justice minister Krum Zarkov criticising the party leadership. The PP–DB coalition also accused the president of meddling after Radev called them "the parties of war" referring to their support of sending arms to Ukraine. ITN believes that the president should have more powers compared to the current roles outlined in the constitution, even advocating for a transition to a presidential republic with ITN calling for a referendum to be held on the decision.

=== Magnitsky sanctions announcement ===
On 10 February 2023, the United States announced a new group of sanctions based on the Magnitsky Act. The sanctions targeted former finance minister in the Second and Third Borisov Governments, Vladislav Goranov, former energy minister in the Stanishev Government, Rumen Ovcharov, the leader of Russophiles for the Revival of the Fatherland, Nikolay Malinov, as well as two former heads of the Kozloduy Nuclear Power Plant. The group were accused of corruption, financial mismanagement and increasing Russian influence.

The announcement served as a reminder of endemic corruption, as well as the political class's close ties to Russia. The announcement provoked a range of differing reactions from political parties and politicians in Bulgaria. Caretaker Minister of the Interior, Ivan Demerdzhiev, characterised the sanctions as "slap in the face" of the Bulgarian judicial system, showing it to be incapable of rooting out corruption, while caretaker Deputy Prime Minister for European Union resources, Atanas Pekanov, and caretaker justice minister, Krum Zarkov, described it as a sign by the US that progress wasn't fast enough on the topic of judicial reform. A similar message was echoed by members of the PP–DB coalition, with DB member of parliament, Atanas Slavov, saying that the new packet of sanctions showed the failings of the current general prosecutor, Ivan Geshev, and that a link existed between GERB, DPS, and BSP due to the former or current connection of the sanctioned figures to those parties.

A more mixed reaction came from GERB and the BSP. Borisov insisted that the party had distanced itself away from Goranov, and claimed he had information that the United States was working on sanctions against PP co-leaders Petkov and Vassilev, for financial mismanagement during their time in office. Other GERB figures, like GERB member of parliament Toma Bikov, insist that evidence must be provided before any judgement can be made. BSP, of whom Rumen Ovcharov remains a member, gave a voice to Rumen Ovcharov at the recent Congress, at which he insisted he was innocent and that the sanctions were meant to worsen Russian-Bulgarian relations. Leader of Bulgarian Rise, Stefan Yanev, indicated that he did not believe that the new sanctions would have an impact on the upcoming election, calling it another scandal that undermined trust between political parties, he did, however, endorse the idea of a thorough judicial reform as long as it kept the judicial branch independent.

Nikolay Malinov, the leader of the party Russophiles for the Revival of the Fatherland, which is contesting the elections as part of the Neutral Bulgaria coalition, insists that he has never received funding from Russia, as alleged by the sanctions, and that he is proud to be included in the list as it showed his opposition to United States influence in Bulgaria.

=== Allegations of vote buying ===
Ivan Demerdzhiev, the minister of the interior in the caretaker government, announced on 17 February that he expects increased attempts at vote buying during this election campaign, with a meeting of Oblast Directors of the Ministry of Interior being dedicated to this topic.

== Opinion polls ==
Graphical representation of recalculated data

Local regression of polls conducted

The opinion poll results below were recalculated from the original data and exclude polls that chose "I will not vote" or "I am uncertain" options.

Polling firm	Fieldwork date	Sample	GERB—SDS	PP–DB		DPS	Revival	BSPzB	BV	VMRO	ITN	IS.BG/ Levitsata!	NDSV	Others	None of the above	Lead
Polling firm	Fieldwork date	Sample	GERB—SDS	PP	DB	DPS	Revival	BSPzB	BV	VMRO	ITN	IS.BG/ Levitsata!	NDSV	Others	None of the above	Lead
2023 election	2 Apr 2023	—N/a	26.5	24.5		13.7	14.2	8.9	3.1	–	4.1	2.2	0.3	2.4	4.1	2.0
Trend	22–29 Mar 2023	1,004	26.4	26.1		13.7	13.3	7.3	3.5	–	3.0	3.6	–	3.1	–	0.3
Alpha Research	25–29 Mar 2023	1,013	25.9	25.4		13.8	13.6	8.2	3.9	–	2.3	3.1	–	3.8	3.7	0.5
Market Links	21–27 Mar 2023	1,014	25.8	27.5		15.8	13.2	8.5	2.4	–	2.7	3.7	–	0.4	–	1.7
Exacta	21–26 Mar 2023	1,050	26.2	25.6		13.7	12.8	7.4	3.3	–	2.9	3.7	–	4.4	–	0.6
Gallup	18–26 Mar 2023	1,004	26.5	26.9		13.3	13.0	7.2	3.5	–	3.0	3.3	–	3.3	4.1	0.4
Sova Harris	18–24 Mar 2023	1,000	25.9	24.6		12.8	12.6	7.8	3.9	–	2.9	4.1	–	5.4	–	1.3
Mediana	17–22 Mar 2023	978	24.7	23.1		13.2	14.5	8.6	4.5	–	3.4	4.3	–	3.8	–	1.6
CAM	16–19 Mar 2023	1,021	24.7	25.7		13.8	12.5	8.1	2.8	–	2.9	4.0	1.2	4.3	3.2 (Note: This poll reported the percentage respondents do not support any party, however the rest of the data was recalculated to exclude these percentages)	1.0
Nasoca	7–14 Mar 2023	1,200	24.8	24.1		13.2	12.2	6.2	4.3	–	3.0	3.1	–	4.4	4.7	0.7
Trend	6–12 Mar 2023	1,003	25.6	26.5		13.6	12.9	7.6	3.6	–	3.1	3.5	–	3.6	5.1	0.9
Gallup	24 Feb–3 Mar 2023	1,008	26.6	27.2		13.4	12.3	7.3	3.7	–	3.4	3.2	–	2.9	–	0.6
Alpha Research	21–27 Feb 2023	1,007	25.2	26.4		13.2	11.3	7.4	3.8	–	3.2	3.6	1.4	4.5	–	1.2
Sova Harris	20–27 Feb 2023	1,000	27.4	25.7		11.7	10.6	9.7	3.7	–	3.1	3.9	0.9	2.0	–	1.7
Market Links	18–27 Feb 2023	1,080	20.4	20.9		13.3	11.8	6.6	2.4	–	1.7	2.3	–	20.6 (Note: As the full data for this poll was not released, it is possible that it includes undecided and uncertain voters. Recalculating the data to only include the numbers for the listed parties may be advised)		0.5
Mediana	19–24 Feb 2023	973	24.6	22.7		11.3	12.5	8.9	4.5	–	3.1	3.5	–	2.8	6.1	1.9
Gallup	2–12 Feb 2023	808	26.1	27.1		13.4	12.3	8.6	4.2		3.9	–	–	4.4	–	1.0
Trend	4–11 Feb 2023	1,003	25.6	24.8		12.8	11.9	8.9	4.0	–	3.3	–	–	3.9	4.8	0.8
10 February 2023			PP and DB announce that they will run together													
Exacta	30 Jan–4 Feb 2023	1,050	26.6	16.4	7.3	12.8	10.0	12.2	4.2	1.1	3.2	–	1.1	2.3	3.0	10.2
Market Links	10–20 Dec 2022	1,022	22.6	16.2	8.3	12.2	10.0	9.6	2.6	–	2.2	–	–	16.3		6.4
Alpha Research	1–13 Dec 2022	1,023	27.6	20.9	7.7	12.3	11.8	10.0	5.1	–	–	–	–	4.7	–	5.7
Exacta	5–12 Dec 2022	1,050	25.2	19.0	7.4	11.5	8.9	10.2	5.2	–	2.7	–	–	4.5	5.4	6.2
Trend	1–8 Dec 2022	1,005	25.8	19.2	7.3	11.6	11.3	9.0	4.0	–	3.1	–	–	3.3	5.4	6.6
Gallup	29 Oct–6 Nov 2022	809	25.5	20.8	8.0	13.1	10.5	9.4	4.5	0.9	3.1	1.3	–	2.9	–	4.7
2022 election	2 Oct 2022	—N/a	24.5	19.5	7.2	13.3	9.8	9.0	4.5	0.8	3.7	1.0	–	5.4	3.4	5.0

== Results ==
According to parallel counts of sample polling stations by several polling agencies, the final result was a close race between GERB—SDS and PP–DB, with all projecting GERB—SDS to be narrowly in the lead. All also suggest that V, DPS, and BSPzB would make it into the parliament, and there was conflicting data on whether ITN would win seats as well.

The following table outlines the results by party. The national threshold at 4% is calculated using total votes for parties and independent candidates only, and not the total of valid votes, which include "None of the above" votes. As such, ITN wins seats despite seemingly falling below 4%.

Party	Votes	%	Seats	+/–
GERB–SDS	669,924	25.39	69	+2
PP–DB	621,069	23.54	64	–9
Revival	358,174	13.58	37	+10
Movement for Rights and Freedoms	347,700	13.18	36	0
BSP for Bulgaria	225,914	8.56	23	–2
There Is Such a People	103,971	3.94	11	+11
Bulgarian Rise	77,420	2.93	0	–12
The Left!	56,481	2.14	0	New
Neutral Bulgaria	10,505	0.40	0	New
Together	8,755	0.33	0	New
People's Party "Truth and Only the Truth"	7,776	0.29	0	0
Conservative Union of the Right	7,739	0.29	0	0
National Movement for Stability and Progress	6,764	0.26	0	New
Out of EU and NATO	6,598	0.25	0	New
People's Voice	5,560	0.21	0	0
Morality, Initiative, Patriotism	3,894	0.15	0	0
Bulgarian Social Democracy – EuroLeft	2,633	0.10	0	0
Bulgarian Union for Direct Democracy	2,517	0.10	0	0
Bulgarian National Unification	2,328	0.09	0	0
Bulgarian National Union – New Democracy	1,753	0.07	0	0
Socialist Party "Bulgarian Way"	730	0.03	0	New
Independents	924	0.04	0	0
None of the above	109,095	4.14	–	–
Total	2,638,224	100.00	240	0
Valid votes	2,638,224	98.34		
Invalid/blank votes	44,617	1.66		
Total votes	2,682,841	100.00		
Registered voters/turnout	6,622,013	40.51		
Source: Electoral Commission of Bulgaria

=== Voter demographics ===
Alpha Research exit polling suggested the following demographic breakdown. The parties that got below 4% of the vote are included in "Others".

Voter demographics in percentage
Social group	GERB–SDS	PP–DB	Revival	DPS	BSP	ITN	BV	Levitsata!	Others	Lead
Exit poll result	25.7	25.1	13.9	13.6	9.0	3.9	3.0	2.3	3.5	0.6
Final result	26.6	24.7	14.2	13.4	9.0	4.1	3.1	2.3	2.6	1.9
Gender
Men	25	24	15	14	9	5	3	2	3	1
Women	26	27	13	11	11	3	2	3	4	1
Age
18–30	19	34	15	15	4	8	1	2	2	15
30–60	27	28	15	13	6	4	3	2	2	1
60+	30	20	8	10	23	2	2	3	2	7
Level of education
Lower education	16	7	7	49	14	3	1	1	3	33
Secondary education	29	20	15	15	11	3	3	1	3	9
Higher education	27	35	14	3	9	3	3	2	4	8
Ethnic group
Bulgarian	27	28	15	1	13	5	4	3	4	1
Turkish	7	6	0	82	3	1	0	0	1	75
Roma	20	8	10	40	12	4	0	1	5	20
Location
Towns and villages	24	12	6	39	13	1	2	1	2	15
Smaller cities	29	20	13	9	16	4	3	2	4	9
Larger cities	27	29	16	4	10	4	3	3	4	2
Sofia	26	42	12	1	7	3	3	3	3	16

=== By constituency ===
Constituency	GERB–SDS	PP–DB	Revival	DPS	BSPzB	ITN	BV	The Left!	Others
Blagoevgrad	32.1%	17.6%	9.2%	19.9%	9.0%	3.5%	4.9%	2.2%	6.1%
Burgas	27.3%	21.2%	14.5%	15.1%	8.4%	4.1%	4.5%	2.1%	5.1%
Varna	32.4%	24.4%	17.4%	6.0%	7.2%	4.8%	2.4%	2.2%	6.3%
Veliko Tarnovo	26.0%	20.9%	17.0%	10.2%	12.6%	4.7%	2.9%	3.0%	6.8%
Vidin	29.9%	21.1%	11.7%	14.6%	11.7%	3.2%	3.2%	2.1%	5.8%
Vratsa	32.4%	17.3%	13.4%	10.7%	11.1%	4.0%	7.2%	1.8%	6.3%
Gabrovo	34.0%	22.1%	17.3%	4.2%	9.6%	4.4%	2.9%	2.7%	5.5%
Dobrich	23.7%	20.2%	17.5%	12.8%	13.4%	4.1%	3.5%	2.2%	5.9%
Kardzhali	10.8%	8.6%	3.5%	70.2%	3.6%	1.0%	0.9%	0.6%	2.0%
Kyustendil	37.1%	20.2%	14.4%	2.8%	13.0%	4.3%	2.6%	2.6%	6.5%
Lovech	34.7%	19.8%	13.7%	7.2%	12.6%	4.2%	2.6%	2.0%	5.4%
Montana	33.3%	15.2%	13.3%	20.0%	9.1%	3.2%	1.8%	2.0%	5.6%
Pazardzhik	29.7%	17.8%	13.4%	17.6%	11.0%	3.8%	2.8%	1.6%	6.1%
Pernik	36.4%	20.2%	15.3%	2.5%	9.9%	4.6%	4.0%	3.8%	6.6%
Pleven	26.7%	20.8%	15.0%	7.7%	12.3%	7.0%	3.1%	4.0%	6.3%
Plovdiv-city	27.0%	31.4%	15.9%	3.3%	8.0%	4.9%	4.2%	2.0%	5.4%
Plovdiv-province	29.5%	20.0%	15.5%	8.4%	14.0%	4.4%	3.9%	1.9%	5.5%
Razgrad	19.1%	18.0%	7.4%	44.4%	5.7%	1.8%	1.5%	0.8%	3.5%
Ruse	24.3%	25.2%	16.6%	10.0%	10.0%	5.4%	2.8%	2.3%	6.6%
Silistra	28.0%	15.5%	10.4%	30.4%	7.7%	2.7%	2.1%	1.3%	4.4%
Sliven	33.2%	20.9%	15.0%	6.2%	11.0%	4.1%	3.7%	3.3%	6.6%
Smolyan	29.3%	20.2%	7.8%	24.9%	9.2%	2.9%	2.6%	1.3%	4.3%
Sofia-city 23	22.4%	44.7%	12.8%	0.8%	6.7%	3.2%	2.8%	3.2%	4.4%
Sofia-city 24	25.1%	40.0%	14.0%	0.8%	6.9%	3.7%	3.1%	2.9%	5.5%
Sofia-city 25	28.3%	32.1%	16.3%	0.7%	7.9%	4.4%	3.4%	2.8%	6.2%
Sofia-province	35.0%	19.3%	14.5%	6.8%	11.8%	4.2%	3.3%	2.3%	6.4%
Stara Zagora	26.3%	21.1%	17.3%	11.1%	10.8%	5.5%	2.8%	2.2%	5.8%
Targovishte	20.9%	13.9%	9.4%	33.2%	14.6%	2.8%	1.7%	1.7%	4.0%
Haskovo	29.3%	20.0%	13.8%	17.6%	8.8%	3.4%	2.6%	2.7%	4.5%
Shumen	25.2%	19.2%	11.4%	26.1%	9.4%	3.0%	2.5%	1.2%	4.8%
Yambol	26.9%	20.6%	17.5%	1.9%	19.2%	4.3%	4.7%	2.1%	5.5%
Bulgarian nationals abroad	8.4%	26.9%	16.7%	36.6%	2.1%	5.2%	1.1%	0.9%	3.3%
source: Electoral Commission of Bulgaria

== Aftermath ==
=== Allegations of count irregularities ===
According to the Central Electoral Commission, 22% of election protocols were entered incorrectly, and some members of PP–DB have shown examples of votes being counted incorrectly.

=== Government formation ===
As per the constitution, the president is required to hand a mandate for government formation to the largest parliamentary group, GERB–SDS. If they fail to propose a government within seven days, or if that government is rejected by the Bulgarian Parliament, the president is required to hand the second mandate to the second-largest parliamentary group, PP–DB. If the second mandate also fails to produce a government, the president grants a third mandate to a party of their choice. If no government is approved by parliament after all three mandates have been returned, fresh elections will be scheduled.

Andrius Tursa, a political risk consult from Teneo, commented that "a temporary technocratic cabinet or another [sixth] vote remain the most likely outcomes of the election" as the margin of GERB's victory was too narrow for them to rule but large enough that no coalition could govern without them, effectively preserving the years-long political deadlock. This potential technocratic government could be supported by both GERB–SDS and PP–DB in order to pass a budget for the year and address the increasing inflation and cost of living in the country. Soon after the election, Kiril Petkov and Assen Vassilev announced that their party would not support a government proposed by GERB. This was reaffirmed three days later when all four co-leaders of PP–DB announced that none of the parties in the coalition would support a GERB-proposed government, or one that included GERB. Despite this, Borisov repeatedly stated that his preferred outcome would be a government between the two. The only form of cooperation between the two groups, that PP–DB were open to, was GERB providing support for their proposed government with the second mandate. During the negotiations, Borisov requested that if they wanted GERB's support, PP–DB needed to publicly release their proposed cabinet. When they did, Borisov criticized the inclusion of PP members as ministers, suggested the inclusion of GERB–SDS ministers, and began negotiations with the other parties the following day. Nikolay Denkov stated that negotiations with GERB regarding cabinet members would not be held. Following the first mandate being given to GERB's candidate, PP–DB reaffirmed that they would not support it.

Another possibility is for GERB and DPS to work with BSP, something Borisov did not rule out. This has been referred to, especially by PP–DB supporters, as the 'Magnitsky coalition', following the Magnitsky sanctions that incriminated MPs from all three parties. Ninova and other senior BSP members stated that the BSP is open to discussion with everyone, but would consult with the party members before a decision is made on whether they would support a potential government or not. When governmental formation negotiations began, Ninova stated that she would not support a GERB government, unless specifically offered to join a coalition, in which case she would ask her party. Borisov in turn said that if PP–DB did not support his government, he could rule with BSP and DPS under certain conditions. Soon after the first mandate was given to GERB, Ninova announced that her party would not support it.

After a three day deadlock, the National Assembly approved GERB's Rosen Zhelyazkov as its speaker on 19 April, allowing for government formation talks to officially begin. Zhelyazkov was supported by GERB–SDS and PP–DB, who had agreed that each of them would retain control of the speakership for three months. On 10 May GERB announced that their PM nominee is Mariya Gabriel, Bulgaria's European commissioner. President Radev gave her the first mandate on 15 May. Gabriel has attempted to win over some of the PP–DB members by making concessions to the coalition, including proposing to remove Ivan Geshev as Chief Prosecutor. However, PP–DB remained steadfast in denying any negotiation with GERB, and the attempted courting soured relations with the BSP. Additionally, Geshev stated that an unnamed high ranking individual requested he resign and handed him resignation papers, which he tore up in front of them.

On 22 May, GERB–SDS and PP–DB announced that they had reached a surprise power-sharing deal (pending approval by MPs of both entities) for at least 18 months, whereby the premiership would be rotated between the two. According to the Financial Times, "under the power-sharing agreement, the PP–DB’s Nikolai Denkov, a former education minister, will become prime minister, with [Mariya] Gabriel serving as his deputy and foreign minister. Gabriel will take over the premiership after nine months as the parties rotate the leadership." The deal was motivated by a desire to end the gridlock that had resulted in multiple inconclusive snap elections over two years, to move closer to fulfilling requirements for membership in the Eurozone, and to implement electronic voting as well as constitutional and comprehensive judicial reform. Kiril Petkov, one of the leaders of PP–DB, nonetheless apologized to those who had voted for him based on a promise of not dealing with GERB.

On 26 May 2023, Radostin Vassilev, a former ITN MP who founded the Civic Movement Strong Bulgaria, released a video snippet seemingly showing Kiril Petkov and Assen Vassilev working towards keeping Borisov out of a court case and agreeing to the appointments of key security services with approval of foreign organizations (particularly the EU and US). He further announced that he was leaving the PP–DB group and would vote against the Denkov-Gabriel rotational government, urging fellow MPs from PP to vote against it as well. The release of the tapes has triggered calls by GERB MPs to renegotiate certain elements of the agreements with PP–DB, especially about the composition of Denkov's Cabinet. On 27 May, Mariya Gabriel, GERB's PM candidate who had led negotiations with PP, announced that government negotiations between GERB and PP were suspended due to a loss of trust because of the contents of the video tape, which included the leaders of PP admitting they wished to lower GERBs influence within the civil service. GERB announced they would be willing to restart government talks with PP, if they pledged to form a government composed of "experts, which both parties could trust". On 27 May, Nikolay Denkov (the PM candidate for PP) confirmed that despite the suspension of talks, he was still in talks with Mariya Gabriel, and that he hoped to re-start official negotiations when the second mandate was officially submitted.

On 28 May, Democrats for a Strong Bulgaria announced their full support for Nikolay Denkov as PM, indicating that Democratic Bulgaria was inclined to support the government.

On 29 May, President Rumen Radev handed the second mandate to PP–DB's Prime Minister candidate, Nikolay Denkov, urging Denkov to return the second mandate unfulfilled due to the loss of trust caused by the leaked tapes. This statement was criticised by PP–DB as unconstitutional and led to a protest outside the Presidential building, with calls for Radev to be impeached, as well as to curtail the powers of the Presidency. Counter protests in support of President Radev were also held.

On 31 May, GERB and PP–DB announced that they re-opened talks about government formation, with meetings taking place between key PP–DB and GERB leaders.

On 2 June, Nikolay Denkov (PP–DB's PM candidate) confirmed that an agreement had been reached about the composition of the cabinet, with some changes taking place to "take out inflammatory political figures and give the government a more expert look". He also confirmed the new composition was approved by all the constituent members of PP–DB. A meeting was also held on that day with the Movement for Rights and Freedoms, where changes to the constitution were discussed. After this meeting, DPS confirmed that they would not "impede" the formation of the Denkov-Gabriel government, and that they would support continued talks about making changes to the constitution.

Denkov's government was approved by the parliament on 6 June.
