= The Left (Bulgaria) =

Political coalition in Bulgaria

The Left! Левицата!
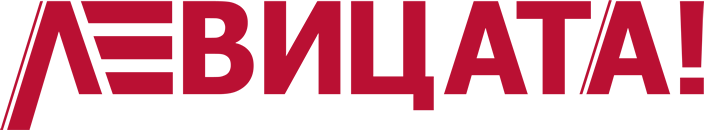
- Leader: Tatyana Doncheva; Valeri Zhablyanov; Kostadin Paskalev
- Founded: 12 February 2023
- Split from: Stand Up.BG! We are coming! (left-wing factions); Bulgarian Socialist Party (faction)
- Merged into: BSP – United Left
- Ideology: Social democracy; Anti-corruption
- Political position: Centre-left to left-wing
- Colours: Red-violet
- National Assembly: 0 / 240

Website
- www.levicata.com

The Left! (Bulgarian: Левицата!, romanized: Levitsata!) was a Bulgarian centre-left to left-wing political coalition established on 12 February 2023. The members of the coalition are Alternative for Bulgarian Revival, Movement 21, Agrarian Union "Aleksandar Stamboliyski", Bulgarian Progressive Line, Georgi Kadiev's Normal Statem and the Bulgarian Socialist Party (BSP) splinter faction led by Valeri Zhablyanov. Stand Up.BG, led by Maya Manolova, was part of the coalition until April 2024.

== Ideology ==
Manolova, the Stand Up.BG leader, believed that the Bulgarian political crisis could be overcome with a united and strong left. According to Manolova, The Left positioned itself as an alternative to the right "pole of war" (represented by GERB–SDS and PP–DB) and opposes sending weapons to Ukraine, supporting the views of President Rumen Radev. The new coalition prioritized incomes, prices, countering monopolies and corruption. The union insists upon an increase in the minimum wage and that there should be no Bulgarians below the poverty line.

According to members of the coalition, it was created to consolidate the voices of the left forces so that "they do not have to vote for other political formations just because, until recently, the ruling party of the left does not correspond to their ideas of how the left should look in Bulgaria." The coalition criticized the BSP of Korneliya Ninova, saying that the BSP is "not able to raise the flag of the left" and stopped dealing with important issues, become only concerned with itself, and that the way out of this would be a change in the leadership of the party. On 11 February 2023, one day before coalition formation, the BSP congress was held, and Ninova was re-elected and part of her opponents were expelled from the party. According to The Left, Ninova refused to join coalition talks.

== History ==
On 12 February 2023, after a four-month dialogue, the creation of the Levitsata! coalition was announced. The coalition announced that it would take part in the 2023 Bulgarian parliamentary election and was in the process of registering for the election. On 13 February, the coalition submitted 6,000 signatures to register for the upcoming election. On 3 March, the list opened its campaign for the 2023 snap election outside the coal power plant "Maritsa Istok 2" located in Stara Zagora oblast, with the list promising to bring up the issues of "ordinary Bulgarian citizens" in the next parliament.

After the snap election, the party remained under the election threshold; however, party spokesman Valeri Zheblyanov promised that the coalition would remain active even if in an extra-parliamentary capacity. The coalition agreed to contest the 2023 Bulgarian local elections, with the coalition leaders authorising alliances with all the "non-governing" parties on the local level, including the BSP, There is Such a People (ITN), and the far-right Revival. The coalition, together with Revival, played an active role in the protests surrounding the removal of the Monument to the Soviet Army in the centre of Sofia, with the alliance's members setting up a tent protest in front of the monument to stop its removal.

In April 2024, Manolova's party Stand Up.BG left the coalition. Former BSP chairman Mikhail Mikov endorsed the party before the 2024 Bulgarian parliamentary election and announced his intention to participate in the election with the coalition. The party failed to enter the 50th National Assembly and received 0.69% of the vote. In July 2024, the coalition announced its intention to participate in future election with the BSP.

== Coalition members ==
=== 2023 ===
Name		Ideology	Political position	Leader	2022 result	
Name		Ideology	Political position	Leader	Votes (%)	Seats
IS.BG	Stand Up.BG	Social liberalism Social democracy Direct democracy	Centre-left to left-wing	Maya Manolova	1.01%	0 / 240
ABV	Alternative for Bulgarian Revival	Social democracy Social conservatism	Centre-left	Rumen Petkov	BV (4.47%)	1 / 240
D21	Movement 21	Social democracy	Centre-left	Tatyana Doncheva	DNP	
ZS-AS	Agrarian Union "Aleksandar Stamboliyski"	Agrarianism	Centre-left	Spas Panchev	DNP	
BPL	Bulgarian Progressive Line	Democratic socialism	Left-wing	Krasimir Yankov	DNP	
ND	Normal State	Progressivism	Centre-left	Georgi Kadiev	DNP	
—	Ex-BSP splinter faction	Social democracy	Centre-left	Valeri Zhablyanov	BSPzB (9.30%)	0 / 240

=== 2024 ===
Name		Ideology	Political position	Leader	2023 result	
Name		Ideology	Political position	Leader	Votes (%)	Seats
ABV	Alternative for Bulgarian Revival	Social democracy Social conservatism	Centre-left	Rumen Petkov	Levitsata! (2.23%)	0 / 240
D21	Movement 21	Social democracy	Centre-left	Tatyana Doncheva	Levitsata! (2.23%)	0 / 240
ZS-AS	Agrarian Union "Aleksandar Stamboliyski"	Agrarianism	Centre-left	Spas Panchev	Levitsata! (2.23%)	0 / 240
—	Ex-BSP splinter faction	Social democracy	Centre-left	Valeri Zhablyanov; Kostadin Paskalev	Levitsata! (2.23%)	0 / 240
NDSO	National Movement for the Salvation of the Fatherland	Left-wing nationalism	Left-wing	Georgi Demerdzhiev	DNP	
ZP	Green Party	Green politics	Centre-left	Marina Dragomiretskaya	DNP	
PDS	Political Movement "Social Democrats"	Social democracy	Centre-left	Yelena Noneva	DNP	

== Election results ==
=== National Assembly ===
Election	Votes	%	Seats	+/–	Government
2023	56,481	2.23 (8th)	0 / 240	New	Extra-parliamentary
Jun 2024	15,175	0.69 (13th)	0 / 240	Steady	Extra-parliamentary

=== European Parliament ===
Election	List leader	Votes	%	Seats	+/–	EP Group
2024	Valeri Zhablyanov	10,230	0.51 (14th)	0 / 17	New	–
