= Running mate =

Person on a joint ticket during an election

A running mate is a person who runs together with another person on a joint ticket during an election. The term is most often used in reference to the person in the subordinate position (such as the vice presidential candidate running with a presidential candidate) but can be properly used to refer to either candidate.

Running mates may be chosen, by custom or by law, to balance the ticket geographically, ideologically, or personally; examples of such a custom for each of the criteria are, geographically, in Nigerian general elections, in which a presidential candidate from the predominantly Christian south is typically matched with a vice presidential candidate from the predominantly Muslim north, and vice versa, ideologically, the Brazilian general elections in 2010 and 2014, where Dilma Rousseff of the left-wing Workers' Party ran alongside Michel Temer of the center-right Brazilian Democratic Movement Party, and, personally, the 2016 Bulgarian presidential election, in which both candidates who went on to the second round of voting, Rumen Radev and Tsetska Tsacheva, had running mates of the opposite gender. The objective is to create a more widespread appeal for the ticket and the results can range from assisting the resulting pair of candidates in appealing to a larger base of people to deterring voters who were initially inclined to vote for the running candidate, but may have been put off by the choice of the running mate.

The term is usually used in countries in which the offices of president and vice president are both directly elected on the same ticket, in reference to a prospective vice president. However, there are countries, such as the Philippines and (nominally) Cyprus, in which the president and vice-president are elected on separate tickets, and frequently, this results in them being from different political parties – indeed, when the Philippine vice-presidential position was restored in 1987, only twice were the president and vice-president elected from the same ticket, in 2004 and 2022. Further, in other countries, such as Botswana and Venezuela, the vice-president is legally appointed by the president in all cases (unlike, for instance, the United States, in which the president appoints a vice-president only in case of a vacancy, or Taiwan, in which the president nominates candidates for vice-president in case of a vacancy and the Legislative Council elects one of them to fill the vacancy).

In cases of both separate elections and appointments, the president and vice-president are not considered running mates because they are not elected on the same ticket.

== In United States politics ==
In the United States, "running mate" refers not only to a candidate for vice president (federal), but also to a candidate for lieutenant governors of those states where the governor and lieutenant governor are jointly elected. Historically, American running mates were chosen by political parties in consultation with the principal candidate (i.e., the person running for president or governor).

In the late 1960s, it became the practice of the principal candidate in presidential elections to announce their preferred choice of running mate at their political party's national convention. The current practice is for the presumptive nominee of a political party to announce their choice for running mate before the national convention.

The practice of running candidates for president and vice president together evolved in the nineteenth century. Originally, electors cast votes for two candidates on the same ballot for president; the candidate who finished in second place in the tabulation became vice president. Starting in 1804, the president and vice president were elected on separate ballots as specified in the Twelfth Amendment to the United States Constitution which was adopted in that year. As more and more states subsequently began to choose their electors by popular election instead of appointment (South Carolina being the last state to change, in 1860), candidates began to realize they could run together as a team for president and vice president instead of running completely separately for each office.

The practice of a presidential candidate having a running mate was solidified during the American Civil War. In 1864, in the interest of fostering national unity, Abraham Lincoln from the Republican Party (popular in the North) and Andrew Johnson of the Democratic Party (popular in the South) were co-endorsed and ran together for president and vice-president as candidates of the National Union Party.

Notwithstanding that this party disbanded after the war ended, with the result that after Lincoln's assassination he was succeeded by a Democrat, Johnson, the states began to place candidates for president and vice-president together on the same ballot ticket, thus making it impossible to vote for a presidential candidate from one party and a vice-presidential candidate from another party, as had previously been possible.

Presidential candidates from smaller states sometimes choose a vice-presidential running mate from a state with a large number of electoral votes as in 1984, when Walter Mondale of Minnesota (10 votes) selected Geraldine Ferraro of New York (then 36 votes).

It is preferred, but not legally required, that the running mate be from a different state from the presidential nominee, because each elector can vote for no more than one candidate from their own state. Running mates can also be chosen from swing states in order to boost a candidate's chance of winning in the state.

In electing a subordinate officer the Electors will not require those qualifications requisite for supreme command. The office of the Vice President will be sinecure. It will be brought to market and exposed to sale to procure votes for the President.

— William Cocke, December 2, 1803, Witcover 1992 cited by Sigelman and Wahlbeck 1997

== Outside the United States ==
In many countries in which there are a president and vice-president with both positions being directly elected by popular vote, the running mate of the winning presidential candidate automatically assumes the vice-presidency; a notable exception is the Philippines, in which one presidential candidate can be (and usually is) elected with the running mate of an opposing candidate.

=== In legislatures ===
In the Republic of Ireland, the term "running mate" refers to members of the same party who are running for the same constituency in a general election for Dáil Éireann, under the STV system.

In party-list proportional representation, candidates of a political party are arranged in a list (whether closed- or open-list) to sit in the number of seats accorded to the party by its percentage of the vote. Candidates who are not seated due to being ranked lower on the list than the number of seats accorded to the party are able to fill the party's seats as alternates if vacancies occur.

== List of adoption of a running mate system ==
Country	Formal adoption	First election used	Before	Notes
United States	1804	1804 (de jure); 1796 (de facto)	Separate election	De facto – The United States formally uses a system of indirect election by an electoral college
Brazil	1966	1966	Separate and indirect election	Indirect election by an electoral college was introduced by the 1969 military junta; until then, the president of Brazil was elected directly.
Brazil	1988	1989	Indirect election under the running mate system	Direct presidential elections were restored, retaining the running mate system, by the 1988 Constitution.
Bangladesh	1989	Never	Appointed by president	Vice-presidency abolished upon reversion to parliamentary System in 1991
Russia	1991	1991	N/A (no vice-presidency)	Vice-presidency abolished in 1993 due to adoption of a new Constitution
Taiwan	1992	1996	Separate and indirect election	
Malawi	1994	1994	N/A (no vice-presidency)	
Indonesia	2002	2004	Separate and indirect election	
Palau	2004	2008	Separate election	The running mate system was abolished in 2008, effective 2012, following which Palau reverted to separate election.
Zambia	2015	2016	Appointed by president	
