= 2016 Bulgarian presidential election =

- 6 November 2016 (first round); 13 November 2016 (second round)
- Turnout: 56.28% (first round); 50.44% (second round)
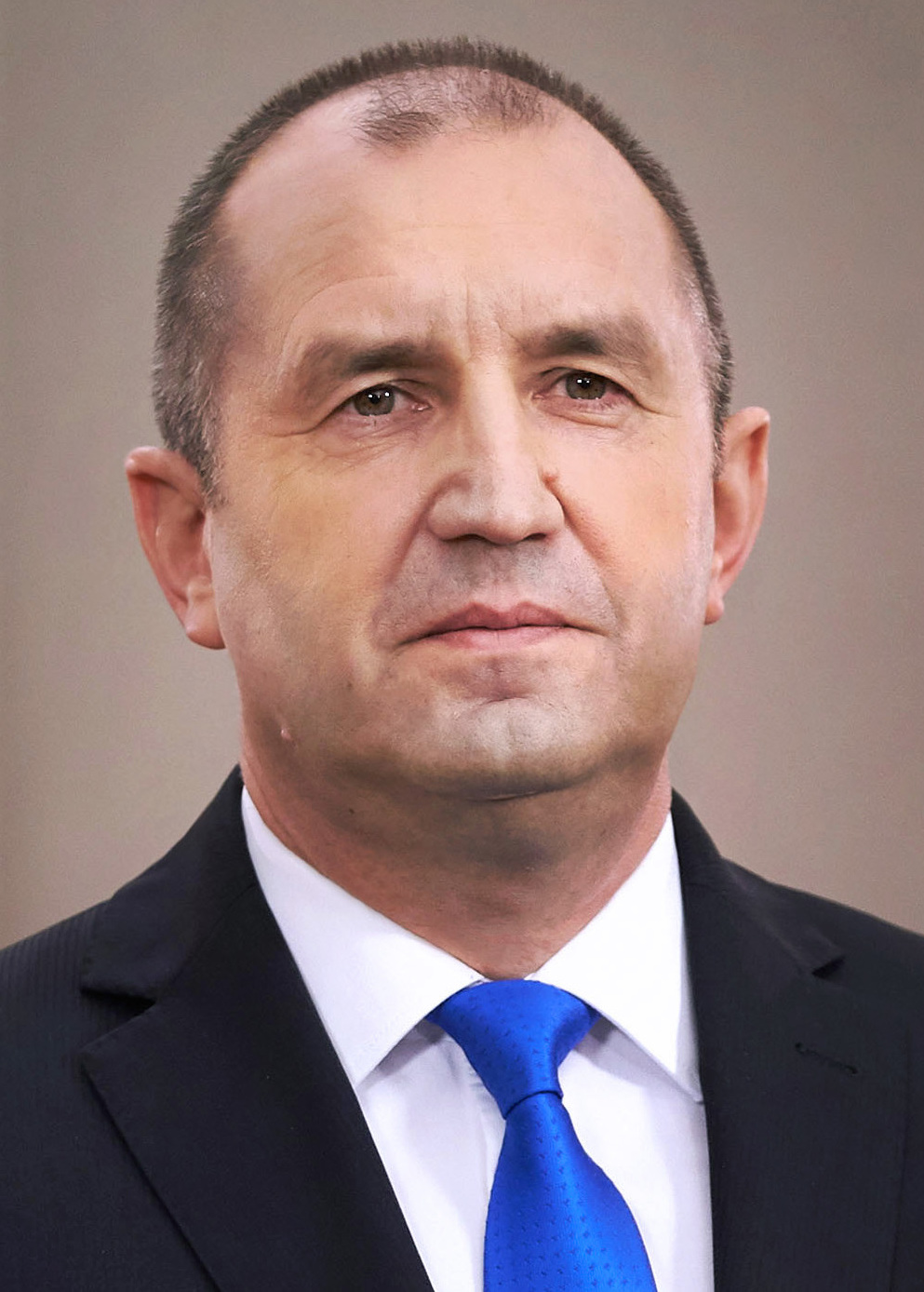

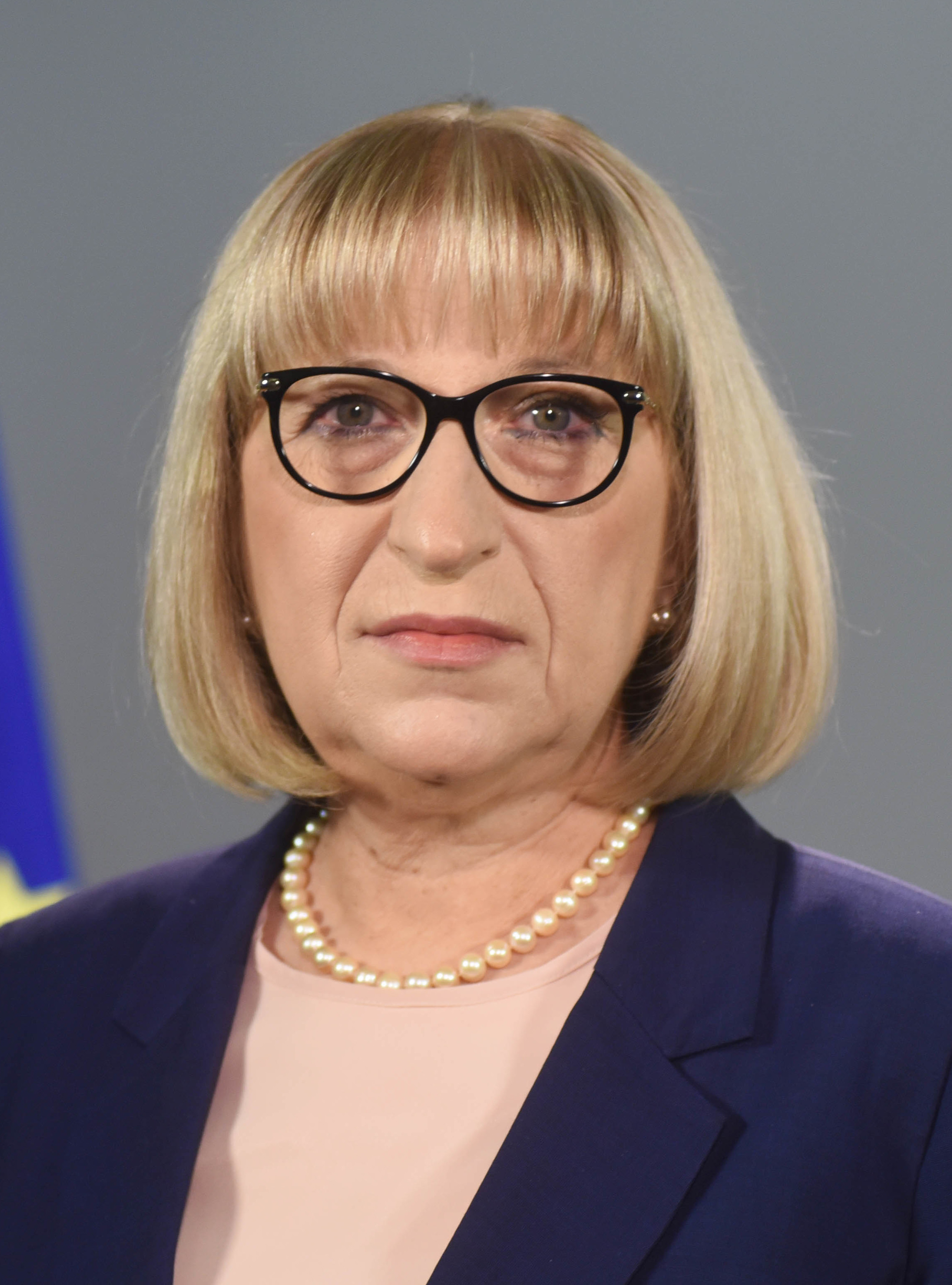
Nominee	Rumen Radev	Tsetska Tsacheva
Party	Independent	GERB
Running mate	Iliana Iotova	Plamen Manushev
Popular vote	2,063,032	1,256,485
Percentage	59.37%	36.16%
- Results by province Radev: 50-60% 60-70% 70-80%
President before election
Rosen Plevneliev
GERB
Elected President
Rumen Radev
Independent

Presidential elections were held in Bulgaria on 6 November 2016, alongside a referendum on changes to the electoral system and political party funding. The second round was held on 13 November 2016, resulting in the victory of Rumen Radev.

== Electoral system ==
The president was elected using the two-round system. For the first time voters were allowed to vote for none of the above.

== Candidates ==
Incumbent president Rosen Plevneliev announced in May 2016 that he would not be running for re-election.

=== Official candidates ===
Presidential candidate	Born	Vice presidential running-mate	Party	Notes
Maj.Gen.Rumen Radev	18 June 1963 (age 53); Town Dimitrovgrad, Region Haskovo, Bulgaria	Iliana Iotova	Independent supported by Bulgarian Socialist Party	General Radev, the former commander of the Bulgarian Air Force, is supported by the Bulgarian Socialist Party and was originally endorsed by the Alternative for Bulgarian Revival, but on 23 August 2016 the Bulgarian Socialist Party denied plans for a common coalition for the presidential elections. Iotova is an MP in the European Parliament.
Tsetska Tsacheva	24 May 1958 (age 58); Village Dragana, Municipality Ugarchin, Region Lovech, Bulgaria	Plamen Manushev	GERB	Tsacheva is the incumbent Chairwoman of the National Assembly of Bulgaria. Manushev is MP.
Krasimir Karakachanov	29 March 1965 (age 51); Rousse, Bulgaria	Yavor Notev	United Patriots	Karachanov is co-chairman of the Patriotic Front and a Deputy Chairman of the National Assembly. Notev is the Deputy Chair of the Attack party and a Deputy Chairman of the National Assembly.
Traycho Traykov	19 April 1970 (age 46); Sofia, Bulgaria	Sabi Sabev	Reformist Bloc	Traykov is the former Minister of Economy, Energy and Tourism and is currently a municipal councilor in Sofia. Sabev is a general in the Bulgarian army.
Ivaylo Kalfin	30 May 1964 (age 52); Sofia, Bulgaria	Lyubomir Halachev	Kalfin President Coalition	Kalfin is a Former Minister of Foreign Affairs and Former Minister of Labour and Social Policy, as well as the BSP presidential candidate in the 2011 election.
Tatyana Doncheva	28 January 1960 (age 56); Tryavna, Bulgaria	Mincho Spasov	Movement 21; National Movement for Stability and Progress	Doncheva is a jurist and a former MP; Spasov is a jurist and former MP.
Plamen Oresharski	21 February 1960 (age 56); Dupnitsa, Bulgaria	Danail Papazov	Independent supported by Movement for Rights and Freedoms	Oresharski is a former Prime Minister of Bulgaria; Papazov is a former minister of Transport.
George Ganchev	29 August 1939 (age 77); Plovdiv, Bulgaria	Kolyo Paramov	Christian Social Union	Ganchev is a former MP and three-time presidential candidate. Paramov is an economist and former MP.
Velizar Enchev	7 January 1953 (age 63); Galabovo, Bulgaria	Bilyana Grancharova	Movement for Radical Change Bulgarian Spring	Enchev is an independent MP; Grancharova is a jurist.
Veselin Mareshki	26 March 1967 (age 49); Varna, Bulgaria	Petar Petrov	Independent	Mareshki is a businessman.
Dimitar Marinov	15 August 1955 (age 61); Karaisen, Bulgaria	Radoslav Petrov (aka Rado Shisharkata)	Bulgarian National Unification	Marinov (known as Mityo The Pistol) is a popular entertainer and reality show star, having appeared in VIP Brother 1, a spinoff of the Big Brother franchise; Petrov (known as Rado the Fircone) is a pop-folk singer.
Vladimir Kuzov	16 June 1966 (age 50); Sofia, Bulgaria	Borislav Noev	Independent	Kuzov and Noev are former MPs from the union around the Attack party; Their registration in the elections was denied due to insufficient number of signatures gathered.
Aleksandar Tomov	27 April 1954 (age 62); Sofia, Bulgaria	Radoslav Radoslavov	Bulgarian Socialdemocratic-Euroleft	Tomov is a businessman.
Gospodin Tonev	29 November 1955 (age 60); Dimitrovgrad, Bulgaria	Andrey Andreev	Bulgarian Democratic Community	
Kamen Popov	Bulgaria	Georgi Nedelchev	Independent	Popov is a businessman, sportsman. Popov struck the leader of Attack party Volen Siderov.
Svetoslav Vitkov	26 January 1971 (age 45); Sofia, Bulgaria	Ivan Velkov	Independent supported by People's Voice; The Greens	Vitkov is a musician, and a municipal councilor in Sofia; Velkov is a Deputy Chairman of the municipal councilor in Sofia. Their registration in the elections was denied due to insufficient number of signatures gathered.
Kemil Ramadan	Bulgaria	Momchil Dobrev	Balkanic Democratic League	
Nikolay Banev	16 August 1959 (age 57); Lyubimets, Bulgaria	Sali Ibrayim	Independent	Banev is a businessman; Ibrayim is a former mayor of Momchilgrad.
Biser Milanov	Bulgaria	Krasimir Nastev	Independent	Milanov is a recidivist; Nastev is a businessman.
Diana Dimitrova	Bulgaria	Gabriel Gerasimov	Independent	
Yordanka Koleva	Bulgaria	Veselin Hristov	Independent	
Plamen Paskov	Bulgaria	Svetozar Saev	Independent	
Rumen Galabinov	Bulgaria	Veska Voleva	Independent	

=== Declined ===
Candidate	Born	Party	Notes
President Rosen Plevneliev	14 May 1964 (age 52); Town Gotse Delchev, Region Blagoevgrad, Bulgaria	Independent	
Prime Minister Boyko Borisov	13 June 1959 (age 57); Town Bankya, Region Sofia, Bulgaria	GERB	Endorsed Tsetska Tsacheva

== Opinion polls ==
=== First round ===
Qualifying for the second round

Pollster	Date	Radev	Tsacheva	Karakachanov	Mareshki	Oresharski	Traykov	Kalfin	Others
Market Links	4 October 2016	14.9	19.8	7.9	–	1.1	4.5	5.4	46.4
Mediana	8 October 2016	18	25.4	9.9	3.2	1.3	4.2	6.1	31.9
Gallup International	12 October 2016	15.1	19.2	7.2	4.7	1.3	5.2	4.9	42.4
Alpha Research	13 October 2016	21.4	29.3	8.7	3.3	0.5	5.0	6.8	25
TSAM	22 October 2016	22	32	9.1	5.3	2.8	5.6	6.3	16.9
IMP	22 October 2016	21.1	26.6	9.7	–	1.8	4.9	8.6	27.3
Gallup International	25 October 2016	16.3	20.2	8.1	5	3.8	5.2	5.3	36.1
Market Links	30 October 2016	18.1	19.4	8.5	4.3	2.2	3.8	3.5	40.2
Online Solutions	3 November 2016	18	19	16	–	–	–	15	32
Barometre Bulgaria	3 November 2016	14.4	19.3	19.1	4.4	4.8	4.6	4.2	29.2

=== Second round ===
Pollster	Date	Radev	Tsacheva	Others
Gallup International	12 October 2016	29.6	26.4	44
Alpha Research	13 October 2016	31.3	32.6	36.1
Sova Harris	15 October 2016	37.8	38.7	23.5
TSAM	22 October 2016	41	43	16
Gallup International	25 October 2016	32.1	31.3	36.6
Market Links	30 October 2016	30.7	25	44.3
Mediana	31 October 2016	37.2	36.2	26.6

== Results ==
Candidate	Running mate	Party	First round		Second round	
Candidate	Running mate	Party	Votes	%	Votes	%
Rumen Radev	Iliana Iotova	Independent (Bulgarian Socialist Party)	973,754	25.44	2,063,032	59.37
Tsetska Tsacheva	Plamen Manushev	GERB	840,635	21.96	1,256,485	36.16
Krasimir Karakachanov	Yavor Notev	United Patriots	573,016	14.97		
Veselin Mareshki	Petar Petrov	Independent	427,660	11.17		
Plamen Oresharski	Danail Papazov	Independent (Movement for Rights and Freedoms)	253,726	6.63		
Traycho Traykov	Sabi Sabev	Reformist Bloc	224,734	5.87		
Ivailo Kalfin	Lyubomir Halachev	Alternative for Bulgarian Revival	125,531	3.28		
Tatyana Doncheva	Mincho Spasov	Movement 21–NDSV	69,372	1.81		
George Ganchev	Kolyo Paramov	Christian Social Union	27,928	0.73		
Velizar Enchev	Bilyana Grancharova	Movement for Radical Change Bulgarian Spring	18,213	0.48		
Dimitar Marinov	Radoslav Petrov	Bulgarian National Unification	14,974	0.39		
Rumen Galabinov	Veska Voleva	Independent	10,286	0.27		
Plamen Paskov	Svetozar Saev	Independent	10,103	0.26		
Aleksandar Tomov	Radoslav Radoslavov	Bulgarian Social Democracy–EuroLeft	9,513	0.25		
Gospodin Tonev	Andrey Andreev	Bulgarian Democratic Community	6,855	0.18		
Kemil Ramadan	Momchil Dobrev	Balkanic Democratic League	6,089	0.16		
Kamen Popov	Georgi Nedelchev	Independent	5,212	0.14		
Diana Dimitrova	Gabriel Gerasimov	Independent	4,362	0.11		
Nikolay Banev	Sali Ibrayim	Independent	4,196	0.11		
Yordanka Koleva	Veselin Hristov	Independent	4,182	0.11		
Biser Milanov	Krasimir Nastev	Independent	3,215	0.08		
None of the above			214,094	5.59	155,411	4.47
Total			3,827,650	100.00	3,474,928	100.00
Valid votes			3,827,650	96.96	3,474,928	98.14
Invalid/blank votes			119,925	3.04	66,036	1.86
Total votes			3,947,575	100.00	3,540,964	100.00
Registered voters/turnout			7,014,723	56.28	7,020,119	50.44
Source: Electoral Commission of Bulgaria

=== Voter demographics ===
Gallup exit polling suggested the following demographic breakdown.

Voter Demographics
Social group	% Radev	% Tsacheva	% Karakachanov	% Mareshki	% Oresharski	% Traykov	% Kalfin	% Others	% Lead
Exit Poll Result	26	22	15	11	6	7	4	9	4
Final Result	25.4	22.0	15.0	11.2	6.6	5.9	3.3	10.5	3.4
Gender
Men	26	21	16	12	6	6	4	9	5
Women	27	23	14	9	6	7	4	10	4
Age
18–30	19	20	11	15	7	10	3	15	1
30-60	23	23	15	11	6	8	4	10	0
60+	39	21	17	6	6	4	5	2	18
Highest Level of Education
Lower Education	29	24	8	10	15	1	4	9	5
Secondary Education	24	23	16	12	6	4	3	10	1
Higher Education	28	20	15	9	2	12	4	10	8
Ethnic Group
Bulgarian - 88%	28	22	17	11	1	8	5	8	6
Turkish - 9%	7	19	1	13	44	1	2	13	25
Roma - 3%	27	36	7	9	8	2	4	7	9
Location
Towns and Villages	25	25	11	9	18	2	3	7	0
Smaller Cities	29	24	18	12	3	5	3	6	5
Larger Cities	27	21	16	12	1	7	4	12	6
Sofia	24	20	16	6	1	16	5	12	4

== Aftermath ==
Following the results of the second round, Prime Minister and GERB leader Boiko Borisov tendered his resignation. Two days later, on 16 November, the National Assembly voted 218–0 to accept it, resulting in early parliamentary elections.
