= Neutral Bulgaria =

Neutral Bulgaria Неутрална България
- Leader: Nikolai Malinov
- Founded: 2023
- Dissolved: 2024
- Preceded by: Left Union for a Clean and Holy Republic
- Succeeded by: Russophiles for Bulgaria
- Ideology: Russophilia; Anti-NATO; Hard Euroscepticism; Factions: Communism; Marxism–Leninism; National conservatism Ultranationalism
- Political position: Big tent Factions: Far-left to far-right
- Colours

Neutral Bulgaria (Bulgarian: Неутрална България, romanized: Neutralna Balgarija) was a coalition of political parties in Bulgaria created to participate in the 2023 Bulgarian parliamentary election. The members are in support of the Russian Federation and Russian president Vladimir Putin, as well as in opposition to NATO.

== History ==
The coalition was led by Nikolai Malinov, who was personally awarded by Vladimir Putin and has been placed under sanctions from the Magnitsky Act. Volen Siderov stood as the party's candidate in Sofia and Varna. The coalition received 0.40% of the vote, well below the 4% threshold to enter the National Assembly.

The coalition fell apart during the lead-up to the October 2024 parliamentary election due to the ideological gap between the right-winged Russophiles and the left-winged communists, as well as internal opposition within the communist parties due to Malinov's espionage charges. Malinov would go on to form the Russophiles for Bulgaria to contest the elections.

== Composition ==
=== 2023 ===
Party	Leader	Ideology	Position
Attack	Volen Siderov	Bulgarian nationalism Ultranationalism	Far-right
Bulgarian Communist Party	Zonka Zlatkova Spasov	Communism; Stalinism	Far-left
Party of the Bulgarian Communists	Collective Leadership	Communism; Marxism-Leninism	Far-left
Russophiles for the Revival of the Fatherland	Nikolai Malinov	Russophilia; National conservatism	Right-wing

=== 2024 ===
Party	Leader	Ideology	Position
Communist Party of Bulgaria	Aleksandar Paunov	Communism; Marxism-Leninism	Far-left
Bulgarian Communist Party	Zonka Zlatkova Spasov	Communism; Stalinism	Far-left
Party of the Bulgarian Communists	Collective leadership	Communism; Marxism-Leninism	Far-left
Russophiles for the Revival of the Fatherland	Nikolai Malinov	Russophilia; National conservatism	Right-wing

== Electoral history ==
=== National Assembly ===
Election	Votes	%	Seats	+/–	Government
2023	10,505	0.42 (#9)	0 / 240	New	Extra-parliamentary
Jun 2024	2,462	0.11 (#25)	0 / 240	Steady	Extra-parliamentary
