= Movement 21 =

Bulgarian political party

Movement 21 Движение 21
- Abbreviation: D21
- Leader: Tatyana Doncheva
- Founder: Tatyana Doncheva
- Founded: 23 April 2010
- Split from: Bulgarian Socialist Party
- Headquarters: 12 Vitosha St., Sofia
- Ideology: Social democracy Pro-Europeanism
- Political position: Centre-left
- National affiliation: Stand Up.BG! We are coming! (2021); The Left! (2023–2024); BSP – United Left (2024–2025)
- Colors: Purple; White
- National Assembly: 0 / 240
- European Parliament: 0 / 17

Website
- d21.bg

Movement 21 (Bulgarian: Движение 21, romanized: Dvizhenie 21, D21) is a political party in Bulgaria established in 2011 and led by Tatyana Doncheva.

== History ==
In April 2010, Tatyana Doncheva, a former Bulgarian Socialist Party (BSP) deputy and member of the party's National Council, presented her new Movement 21 (D21) project, which she plans to set up as a civic association to be established as a non-governmental organization, and within a few months later became a political party. In 2011, it was established as a political party. D21 joined the BSP – United Left (BSP–OL) electoral coalition in the run-up to the October 2024 Bulgarian parliamentary election but left the alliance in 2025 following the BSP leadership negotiating to join government with GERB.

== Elections ==
Presidential elections

In the 2016 Bulgarian presidential election, the party formed a coalition with the National Movement for Stability and Progress (NDSV), with presidential candidate Tatyana Doncheva and vice presidential candidate Mincho Spasov. They received 69,372 votes, or 1.81% support, with 57.47% turnout.

Parliamentary elections

In the 2017 Bulgarian parliamentary election, the party formed a coalition with Alternative for Bulgarian Revival (ABV), together receiving 54,412 actual votes, or 1.59% support, with 54.07% turnout. In the April 2021 Bulgarian parliamentary election, the party was part of the Stand Up! Mafia, Get Out! coalition which received 4,64% of the popular vote and 14 seats in the National Assembly.

European Parliament elections

In the 2019 European Parliament election in Bulgaria, the party received 4,141 actual votes, or 0.21% support, with 32.64% turnout.

Local elections

In the 2015 Bulgarian local elections, the party won 25 municipal councilors in various municipalities, including among others Blagoevgrad, Garmen, Petrich, Lom, Sopot, Vidin, Tvarditsa, and Sofia.

== Election results ==
=== National Assembly ===
Election	Leader	Votes	%	Seats	+/–	Government
2014	Tatyana Doncheva	39,221	1.19 (8th)	0 / 240	New	Extra-parliamentary
2017 (Note: Ran in coalition with ABV)	Tatyana Doncheva	54,412	1.55 (10th)	0 / 240	0	Extra-parliamentary
Apr 2021 (Note: Ran as part of the Stand Up! Mafia, Get Out! coalition)	Tatyana Doncheva	150,940	4.65 (6th)	14 / 240	▲14	Snap election
Jul 2021	Tatyana Doncheva	136,885	4.95 (6th)	13 / 240	▼1	Snap election
Nov 2021 (Note: Ran as part of the Stand Up.BG! We are coming! coalition)	Tatyana Doncheva	60,055	2.26 (8th)	0 / 240	▼13	Extra-parliamentary
2022	Tatyana Doncheva	Did not contest		0 / 240	0	Extra-parliamentary
2023 (Note: Ran as part of The Left coalition)	Tatyana Doncheva	56,481	2.14 (8th)	0 / 240	0	Extra-parliamentary
Jun 2024	Tatyana Doncheva	15,175	0.69 (1th3)	0 / 240	0	Extra-parliamentary
Oct 2024 (Note: Ran as part of the BSP – United Left coalition)	Tatyana Doncheva	184,403	7.32 (5th)	0 / 240	0	Extra-parliamentary

=== European Parliament ===
Election	List leader	Votes	%	Seats	+/–	EP Group
2019	Danail Georgiev	4,141	0.21 (17th)	0 / 17	New	–
2024 (Note: Ran as part of The Left coalition)	Valeri Zhablyanov	10,230	0.51 (14th)	0 / 17	0	–

== See also ==
- List of political parties in Bulgaria
