= Bulgarian Progressive Line =

Democratic socialist party in Bulgaria

Bulgarian Progressive Line Българска прогресивна линия Bŭlgarska progresivna liniya
- Abbreviation: BPL
- Leader: Krassimir Yankov
- Founded: 26 November 2020
- Registered: 3 February 2021
- Split from: Bulgarian Socialist Party
- Preceded by: Bulgarian Liberal Party
- Headquarters: Bacho Kiro 26, Sofia
- Ideology: Democratic socialism
- Political position: Left-wing
- National affiliation: Left Union for a Clean and Holy Republic (2021); The Left! (2023)
- Colours: Red
- National Assembly: 0 / 240

Website
- bpl.bg

The Bulgarian Progressive Line (Bulgarian: Българска прогресивна линия, romanized: Bŭlgarska progresivna liniya, BPL) is a democratic socialist and left-wing political party in Bulgaria. It has been the successor of the Bulgarian Liberal Party.

== History ==
The party was created in the winter of 2020–2021 by several progressive deputies of the National Assembly of Bulgaria who split from the Bulgarian Socialist Party. The BPL participated in the April 2021 Bulgarian parliamentary election but did not meet the electoral threshold. The party had 3,751 votes (0.15%).

In July 2021, the party entered the Left Union for a Clean and Holy Republic coalition with the Party of the Bulgarian Communists, the Left Alternative, the Socialist Party "Bulgarian Way", and the party Revival of the Fatherland.

Prior to the 2023 Bulgarian parliamentary election, the party was registered as part of the Levitsata! coalition.

In the June 2024 Bulgarian parliamentary election, the parties nominal leader, Krasimir Yankov, ran as part of Bulgarian Rise.

== Election results ==
=== National Assembly ===
Election	Votes	%	Seats	+/–	Government
Apr 2021	3,751	0.12 (#20)	0 / 240	New	Extra-parliamentary
Jul 2021 (Note: Run as part of the Left Union coalition.)	10,309	0.37 (#11)	0 / 240	0	Extra-parliamentary
Nov 2021	1,498	0.06 (#24)	0 / 240	0	Extra-parliamentary
2022	Did not contest		0 / 240	0	Extra-parliamentary
2023 (Note: Run as part of The Left coalition.)	56,481	2.14 (#8)	0 / 240	0	Extra-parliamentary
June 2024	Did not contest		0 / 240	0	Extra-parliamentary
