= Russophiles for the Revival of the Fatherland =

Bulgarian political party

- Leader: Valentin Grigorov
- Honorary Chairman: Nikolay Malinov
- Founder: Yordan Mutafchiev
- Founded: 2009
- Headquarters: Sofia, 1298 "Mikhail Marinov" St. No. 21
- Membership: 250
- Ideology: Russophilia; National conservatism Hard Euroscepticism
- Political position: Right-wing
- National affiliation: Patriotic Front (2014); Coalition for Bulgaria (2019); Left Union for a Clean and Holy Republic (2021); Neutral Bulgaria (2023–2024); Russophiles for Bulgaria (since 2024)
- Slogan: "Strong State – Traditional Values – Multipolar World"
- National Assembly: 0 / 240
- European Parliament: 0 / 17
- Provinces of Bulgaria: 0 / 28
- Municipalities of Bulgaria: 8 / 266

Website
- ppvo.bg

Russophiles for the Revival of the Fatherland (Note: Formerly just Revival of the Fatherland (Bulgarian: възраждане на Отечеството, romanized: Vazrazhdane na Otechestvoto)) (Bulgarian: Русофили за възраждане на Отечеството, romanized: Rusofili za vazrazhdane na Otechestvoto) is a Bulgarian political party. The leader of the party is Nikolay Malinov.

== History ==
On November 1, 2008, a congress was held to create Revival of the Fatherland with 500 generals and officers of the Bulgarian Land Forces in attendance. The two founding groups of the party were two Veterans' organizations; "For the Honor of the Epaulette" and the "Green Alliance" with the party officially being founded in 2009 and receiving court recognition on February 11, 2010. In 2014, the party became part of the Patriotic Front coalition. In 2019, the party has been part of the Coalition for Bulgaria led by the Alternative for Bulgarian Revival. In the 2019 Bulgarian local elections the party saw 64 councilors and 8 mayors elected. During the party's congress on September 5, 2020, the party elected Nikolay Malinov as its leader and four members of its Russophile wing were elected to the party's executive board. For the 2021 Bulgarian general election the party was part of the Left Union for a Clean and Holy Republic coalition and signed a memorandum of cooperation with United Russia.

=== Neutral Bulgaria ===
In 2023 the party spearheaded the formation of the Neutral Bulgaria coalition, consisting of Russophiles for the Revival of the Fatherland, as well as: Attack, Party of the Bulgarian Communists, and the Bulgarian Communist Party. The goal of the alliance was to pursue a reconciliatory policy towards Russia by withdrawing from NATO. During the 2023 Bulgarian parliamentary election the coalition received just 0.40% of the vote with Attack leaving and the Communist Party of Bulgaria joining for the June 2024 parliamentary election where they received an even worse 0.11%. After this the coalition collapsed due to the ideological divide between the right winged Russophiles and the left winged communists, as well as due to internal opposition in the communist parties due to Malinov's espionage charges.

=== Russophiles for Bulgaria ===
Malinov announced that Russophiles for the Revival of the Fatherland would be contesting the October 2024 parliamentary election as a member of Russophiles for Bulgaria. They were joined by the Bulgarian Communist Party and the Party of Bulgarian Communists.

Russophiles for Bulgaria ended up earning just 0.35% of the vote.

== Election results ==
=== National Assembly ===
Election	Leader	Votes	%	Seats	+/–	Status
2014 (Note: Run as part of the Patriotic Front coalition.)	Yordan Mutafchiev	239,101	7.18 (#5)	19 / 240	New	Support
2017	Yordan Mutafchiev	Did not contest		0 / 240	▼19	Extra-parliamentary
Apr 2021	Nikolay Malinov	13,182	0.41 (#15)	0 / 240	0	Extra-parliamentary
Jul 2021 (Note: Run as part of the Left Union coalition.)	Nikolay Malinov	10,309	0.37 (#11)	0 / 240	0	Extra-parliamentary
Nov 2021	Nikolay Malinov	6,803	0.26 (#17)	0 / 240	0	Extra-parliamentary
2022	Nikolay Malinov	6,533	0.25 (#14)	0 / 240	0	Extra-parliamentary
2023 (Note: Run as part of the Neutral Bulgaria coalition.)	Nikolay Malinov	10,505	0.40 (#9)	0 / 240	0	Extra-parliamentary
Jun 2024	Nikolay Malinov	2,462	0.11 (#25)	0 / 240	0	Extra-parliamentary
Oct 2024 (Note: Run as part of Russophiles for Bulgaria)	Nikolay Malinov	8,860	0.35 (#12)	0 / 240	0	Extra-parliamentary
