= Vladimir Kuzov =

Bulgarian politician

Personal details
- Born: Vladimir Parvanov Kuzov; 16 June 1966 (age 59) Sofia, Bulgaria
- Party: Independent (2006-present) Attack (2005-2006)
- Profession: Politician

Vladimir Parvanov Kuzov (Bulgarian: Владимир Първанов Кузов) is a Bulgarian politician. He was an MP in the 40th National Assembly.

In early 2009, several months before the end of the mandate of the National Assembly, Kouzov received a suspended sentence for child sexual abuse. and his status as an MP was taken away.

== Political activity ==
Vladimir Kuzov entered parliament on July 11, 2005 on the list of the National Attack League, but at the beginning of February 2006 was expelled from the parliamentary group of the coalition after saying that he faced police investigation for sexual acts with minors. According to the National Attack League party, Kouzov proposed for MP from National Movement for the Salvation of the Fatherland and closest to his political circle "New Dawn". He introduced Bill 26 as an MP.

On February 18, 2009 Kouzov got a suspended sentence for child molestation. On February 26, 2009 the National Assembly terminated his mandate as a lawmaker. His seat in parliament was given to loan financier Nadia Ivanova.

In 2016 Bulgarian presidential election he was an independent presidential candidate supported by an initiative committee. His registration was denied however since he failed to submit a petition with at least 2500 valid signatures.
