= Nikolay Banev =

Bulgarian businessman, entrepreneur

Nikolay Yordanov Banev

Personal details
- Born: 16 August 1959 (age 66) Lyubimets, Bulgaria
- Party: Bulgarian Communist Party (before 1989); Independent (1989–present)
- Profession: Politician, businessman

Nikolay Yordanov Banev (Bulgarian: Николай Йорданов Банев; born 16 August 1959) is a Bulgarian businessman, entrepreneur. Founder in 1990 of the Fund "AKB Fores" (later "AKB Fores – Bulgarian investment group" AD) holding shares in more than 130 companies in Bulgaria, Russia, Switzerland, the Netherlands, the Republic of Macedonia. According to various sources the condition of Nikolay Banev amounts to more than 1 billion. Levs, distributed securities, shares, real estate, etc.

Since 2019 he remains under arrest for a wide variety of crimes. He is charged with money laundering, tax evasion and document fraud.

== Early life and education ==
The father of Nicholas – Jordan Banev, is the youngest officially recognized active fighter against fascism and capitalism in Haskovo for yatashkata activity that began 14 years of age.

Nikolai Banev graduated from the Russian Language School in Haskovo, then Bulgarian Philology at Plovdiv University "of Plovdiv" and Labour Economics at HIE "Karl Marx".

Nikolai Banev began his occupation as a turner at the factory relays in Harmanli.

His military service in the Bulgarian People's Army earned as a soldier in the School for reserve officers in Shumen (1977–1978) and as sergeant-Shkolnik 15 months serving in operational-tactical missile troops (1978–1979). Dismiss as a reserve officer.

During his school years in the army, Banev was a Komsomol activist. In 1977 Banev became a Komsomol secretary. In early 1981 began full-time work in Dimitrov Communist Youth Union (DKMS), where he worked until 1988 as an instructor in the organizational department of the District Committee of Komsomol in Haskovo. Eight years working in the DKMS, as he held various managerial positions in the Factory Committee, Municipal Committee, District Committee and the Central Committee of DKMS. During this time and occupies positions in numerous local and central government and various social organizations and movements.

== Career ==
In 1990 he created one of the first private companies in Bulgaria. The company starts as one of the first security companies in Haskovo. Founders are Nikolai Banev Rosen Arakliev, the son of the commander of the partisan unit "Zlatarov" Ivan Arakliev Regiment. Kostadinov.

In 1996, he took a loan of $3,500,000 from the Czech "Forestinvest" and participated in the mass privatization through the company "AKB Fores". Using an advertising campaign the company tempted investors from across the country with high interest (up to 40% annually, according to advertising), and tens of thousands of citizens were willing to invest their voucher booklets. The capital raised was 2.7 million lev. AKB won stakes in over 30 companies, but investors did not get interest and did not get their money back, and the Czechs from "Forestinvest" that give part of the name and prestige of the privatizers, did not get their loans back. Although it received a license for one of the established three privatization funds, in 1997 Banev managed to attract the confidence of the 124,000 Bulgarians who entrust AKB Fores SOCIAL vouchers's licenses.

In 2000, he bought about 70 thousand. USD complex "Kavaci" and camping "Garden", "Kavaci", "Goldfish", "Veselie" and "Chernomorets", Sozopol residence and restaurant "Wine Cellar" Tavern "and" horizon 'in Sozopol.

In 2003 Banev acquires newspaper "Cash".

2016 Nikolai Banev is the majority owner of FIC "AKB Fores" HAD. Holding public limited company at that time owns shares in about 100 companies from the entire spectrum of the economy – heavy industry, light industry, services, service sector and others.

Nikolai Banev participate as owner in: AKB Fores, Chiminvest, ACB and ACB Industry Consortium. In management's Golf hotels Irakli Forest Green HAD, Glamour, Elmatech, Elma Electric, Association "Tennis Club Mermaid" tourist holding Rusalka Holidays, Air Slide, Helio-tour with, Association "Golf Club Irakli" Kostenetz – HHI, Polymers, Heat Yambol, DHC Kazanlak, European corporation for effective development, polychlorinated Bulgaria and heavy machinery.

Nikolai Banev was accused in dozens of cases of deliberate bankruptcy of over 100 privatized enterprises. Banev were brought against dozens of civil claims by residents of the town usurpation of private property and unauthorized use. Lawsuits are kept for unpaid wages of employees in numerous companies.

Nikolai Banev is a member of the Board of BRCCI (Bulgarian-Russian Chamber of Commerce).

Full member (academician) of the International Academy of Electrical based in Moscow.

Chairman and member of several non-profit organizations, including "Democracy Network"; "Southern Spring"; International Music Academy "Rusalka" and others.

In 1997/98, he was president of PFC "Pirin" Blagoevgrad, briefly sponsor of September (Sofia), then became the owner of Beroe.

The 2016 Bulgarian presidential election Nicolas Banev run for president paired with Sally Ibryam.

== Personal life ==
Nikolai Banev been awarded many times by Bulgarian, Russian, Macedonian, Ukrainian government and public awards – medals, diplomas and more.

Nikolai Banev had three marriages. His first wife, Krasimira, had a daughter. His second wife was a poet and public figure, Dochka Baneva, who died in 2005, from which they had a son. The third wife of Nicholas Banev is Eugenia Baneva who is the CEO of TX Rusalka Holidays. By Eugenia Baneva they have four children. Banev has a grandson.

He is estranged from his eldest son.

== Crimes and prosecution ==
In January 2019 private bailiffs accompanied by police, seized Banev's house in the Boyana district of Sofia. After defaulting on a loan of 15,000 Leva (approximately 7500 Euro) with costs Sofia city court ruled against Banev to a total of 102,000 leva. On 20 March 2019 the house was sold at auction for 5.78 million leva to settle the debt.
