= 2016 Bulgarian referendum =

- 6 November 2016

Do you support MPs being elected by a majority electoral system with an absolute majority in two rounds?
For	73.80%
Against	16.47%
Neither	9.73%

Do you support the introduction of compulsory voting in elections and referendums?
For	63.48%
Against	26.63%
Neither	9.89%

Do you support the annual state subsidy granted to finance political parties and coalitions to be one lev for every vote received in the last parliamentary elections?
For	74.02%
Against	15.40%
Neither	10.58%
- Yes: 50-60% 60-70% 70-80%

A three-question referendum was held in Bulgaria on 6 November 2016 alongside presidential elections. Voters were asked whether they supported limiting public funding of political parties to one lev per year per valid vote received at the previous elections, the introduction of compulsory voting in elections and referendums, and changing the electoral system for the National Assembly to the two-round system. In order to be binding, the number of voters participating in the referendum must be equal to or higher than the number who voted in the 2014 parliamentary elections.

All three proposals were supported by a majority of those voting, but the number of votes cast (3,488,484) was around 12,000 lower than in the 2014 parliamentary elections, meaning the quorum was not met. However, as over 20% of registered voters voted in favour, the proposals still had to be debated in the National Assembly. The National Assembly subsequently rejected all three proposals.

== Conduct ==
Slavi Trifonov, the initiator of the referendum claimed that the number of people voting in the referendum was actually slightly higher than the number required to make it mandatory, that the Election Commission had closed polling stations while people were still waiting to vote and had removed video surveillance from polling stations to "sabotage the referendum". Some sections could not serve all the voters in reasonable time and a number waited on the line and could not vote, other sections closed earlier than the appointed time (20:00) and in some sections entire boxes with ballots were locked in the sections themselves to avoid their enumeration. Trifonov claimed that more than 12,000 ballots were excluded from the count for not being in an envelope.

== Results ==
Question	For		Against		None of the above		Invalid/ blank	Total votes	Registered voters	Turnout	Outcome
Question	Votes	%	Votes	%	Votes	%	Invalid/ blank	Total votes	Registered voters	Turnout	Outcome
Two-round system for parliamentary elections	2,509,864	73.80	560,024	16.47	330,928	9.73	87,668	3,488,484	6,865,086	50.81	Quorum not met
Compulsory voting	2,158,929	63.48	905,691	26.63	336,180	9.89	87,668	3,488,468	6,865,086	50.81	Quorum not met
Political funding	2,516,791	74.02	523,759	15.40	359,778	10.58	87,668	3,487,996	6,865,086	50.81	Quorum not met
Source: CIK
