= Tsetska Tsacheva =

Bulgarian jurist and politician

- Цецка Цачева
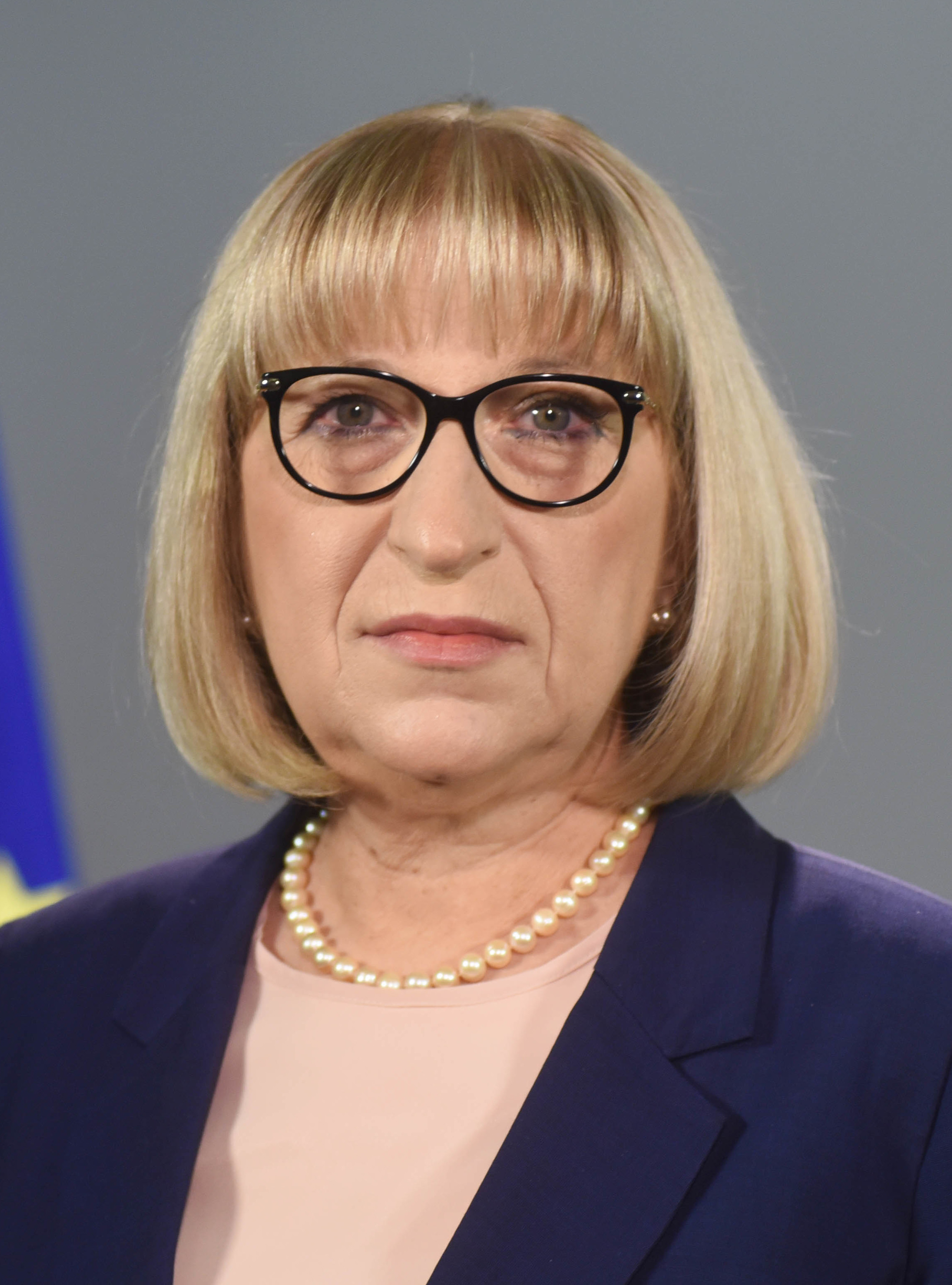
- Tsacheva in 2017

Minister of Justice
- In office 4 May 2017 – 5 April 2019
- Prime Minister: Boyko Borisov
- Preceded by: Maria Pavlova
- Succeeded by: Danail Kirilov

Chair of the National Assembly
- In office 27 October 2014 – 26 January 2017
- Preceded by: Mihail Mikov
- Succeeded by: Dimitar Glavchev
- In office 14 July 2009 – 13 March 2013
- Preceded by: Georgi Pirinski
- Succeeded by: Mihail Mikov

Personal details
- Born: 24 May 1958 (age 68) Dragana, Bulgaria
- Party: Communist Party (Before 1989); GERB (2006–present)
- Education: Sofia University

Tsetska Tsacheva Dangovska (Bulgarian: Цецка Цачева Данговска; born 24 May 1958) is a Bulgarian politician and jurist. A member of centre-right conservative GERB political party, Dangovska has served as the Minister of Justice from 4 May 2017 to 5 April 2019. She had previously held the position of Chairwoman of the National Assembly of Bulgaria on two occasions. She was the first woman to ever chair the National Assembly since its establishment in 1878.

== Background ==
Tsacheva was born in Dragana, Ugarchin Municipality, Lovech Province. She finished the Pleven High School of Mathematics in 1976 and graduated in law from Sofia University.

A member of the Pleven Bar Association, she practised as a lawyer and was subsequently a head legal advisor to the Pleven Municipality for seven and a half years until 2007.

Tsacheva is married to the architect Rumen Dangovski and has a son, also named Rumen, who is a college student studying Math at the Massachusetts Institute Of Technology in the United States.

== Political career ==
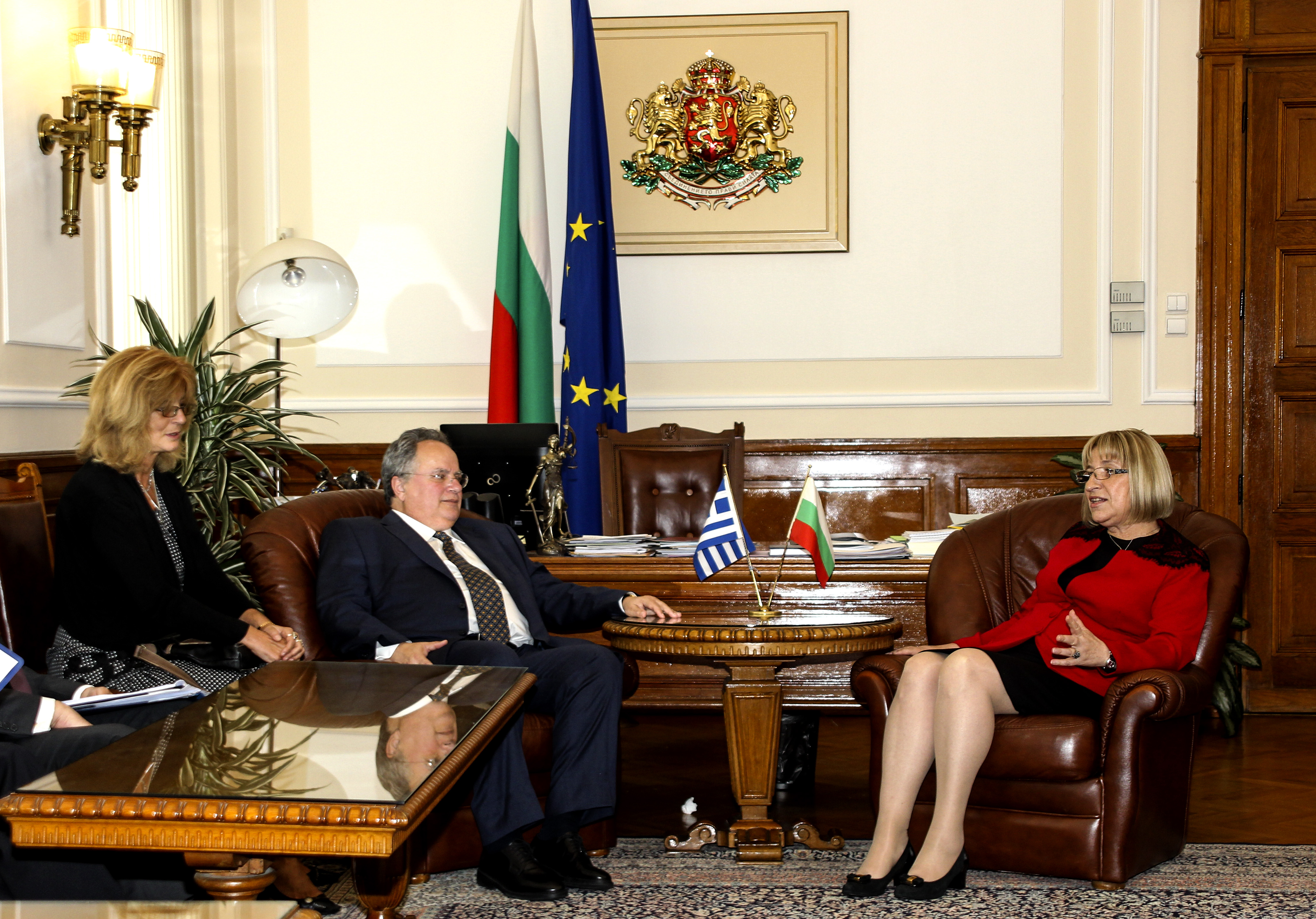
Tsacheva in 2015 with Greek Minister for Foreign Affairs Nikos Kotzias

Until the democratic changes in 1989, Tsacheva was a member of the Bulgarian Communist Party, though she quit promptly after the fall of the People's Republic of Bulgaria. In 2007, she joined the Pleven Municipal Council as a member of Boyko Borisov's party GERB. Tsacheva was GERB's candidate for mayor of Pleven in 2007, but she only came third as Nayden Zelenogorski of the Union of the Democratic Forces won his third term in the first round. Tsacheva was also behind the Bulgarian Socialist Party's Vasil Antonov in that election.

In the 2009 Bulgarian parliamentary election, Tsacheva headed GERB's voting list in Pleven Province and was also the party's proportional candidate for that constituency. She won the proportional elections in Pleven Province with 36.92%, or 54,880 votes. After her party's decisive electoral victory, she was selected as GERB's candidate for Chairwoman of the National Assembly of Bulgaria and was unanimously elected to that post by 227 votes out of 240 and no votes against.

Tsacheva was considered a member of the reform-minded group around Deputy Prime Minister Simeon Djankov. She ensured the passage of several legislative packages to reduce the burden on business and avoid a meltdown of the banking system.

=== Presidential candidate ===
Tsacheva was nominated to be her party's candidate for the 2016 Presidential election. Plamen Manushev was chosen to be the vice-presidential candidate. She lost the run-off to Rumen Radev, former air force commander. As a reaction, prime minister Boyko Borisov resigned.

Political offices
Preceded by Georgi Pirinski	Chair of the National Assembly; 2009–2013	Succeeded by Mihail Mikov
Preceded by Mihail Mikov	Chair of the National Assembly; 2014–2017	Succeeded by Dimitar Glavchev
Preceded by Maria Pavlova	Minister of Justice; 2017–2019	Succeeded by Danail Kirilov
