= Yavor Notev =

Bulgarian politician

Yavor Bozhilov Notev

Vice Chairperson of the National Assembly of Bulgaria
- Incumbent
- Assumed office 19 April 2017
- In office 27 October 2014 – 26 January 2017

Personal details
- Born: 10 July 1957 (age 68) Sofia, Bulgaria
- Party: United Patriots (2016-present) Attack (2005-present)
- Spouse: died in 2013
- Children: Borislav (died in 2017)
- Profession: Jurist, Politician

Yavor Bozhilov Notev (Bulgarian: Явор Божилов Нотев) is a Bulgarian politician, member of the Bulgarian political party "Ataka" (Attack). He is a deputy in the 43rd National Assembly of Bulgaria.

== Biography ==
Yavor Notev was born on 10 July 1957 in Sofia.

He graduated in law from Sofia University "St. Kliment Ohridski".

He spent five years working as an investigator in the Department for the Investigation of Serious Accidents and Catastrophes.

Since 1988, he was a lawyer from the Sofia college and worked on criminal cases.

He was an MP from Attack in the 41st, 42nd, vice president of the 43rd National Assembly, Deputy Chairman of the Committee on Legal Affairs, the first rotating Chairman of the Subcommittee control SIMs and a candidate for mayor of the town. Sofia in 2015, a candidate for Vice President of the Republic of Bulgaria Ataka in 2016 Bulgarian presidential election, paired with the presidential candidate of VMRO Krasimir Karakachanov. The couple received the support of the parliamentary parties of the Patriotic Front - and NFSB VMRO and Ataka.
