= Agrarian Union "Aleksandar Stamboliyski" =

Bulgarian political party

Agrarian Union "Aleksandar Stamboliyski" Земеделски съюз „Александър Стамболийски“
- Abbreviation: ZS-AS
- Leader: Spas Panchev
- Founded: 1993
- Split from: Bulgarian Agrarian People's Union
- Headquarters: Sofia
- Ideology: Agrarianism
- Political position: Centre-left
- National affiliation: BSP for Bulgaria (1994–1997, 2013–April 2021); The Left (2023-)
- Colours: Orange; Green
- National Assembly: 0 / 240
- European Parliament: 0 / 17
- Municipalities: 4 / 265

Website
- bznsas.org

The Agrarian Union "Aleksandar Stamboliyski" (Bulgarian: Земеделски съюз „Александър Стамболийски“, romanized: Zemedelski Sayuz "Aleksandar Stamboliyski", ZS-AS), is an agrarian political party in Bulgaria.

It was founded in 1993 by members of the Bulgarian Agrarian People's Union. Until 2005 it was known as the Bulgarian Agrarian People's Union "Aleksandar Stamboliyski" (Balgarski Zemedelski Naroden Sayuz "Aleksandar Stamboliyski", BZNS-AS). Since 2001 it is part of the Coalition for Bulgaria, an alliance led by the Bulgarian Socialist Party.

At the Bulgarian parliamentary election in 2009, the Coalition for Bulgaria received 17.7% of the popular vote and 40 out of 240 seats. The party had only 1 seat for its leader Panchev.

During the 2017 Bulgarian parliamentary election the ZS-AS ran on the electoral-list of Coalition for Bulgaria, where it won 1 seat of a total of 80, that the coalition won. In 2019 due to squabbles with BSP, ZS-AS left the alliance and its one single MP move to the group of the Independent MPs in parliament, still representing the ZS-AS.

== Election results ==
=== National Assembly ===
Election	Leader	Votes	%	Seats	+/–	Government
1994 (Note: Run as part of the Democratic Left coalition.)	Svetoslav Shivarov	2,262,943	43.50 (#1)	1 / 240	New	Coalition
1997	Svetoslav Shivarov	939,308	22.07 (#2)	0 / 240	▼1	Extra-parliamentary
2001 (Note: Run as part of the Coalition for Bulgaria coalition.)	Svetoslav Shivarov	783,372	17.15 (#3)	0 / 240	0	Extra-parliamentary
2005	Spas Panchev	1,129,196	30.95 (#1)	0 / 240	0	Extra-parliamentary
2009	Spas Panchev	748,147	17.70 (#2)	1 / 240	▲1	Opposition
2013	Spas Panchev	942,541	26.62 (#2)	1 / 240	0	Coalition
2014 (Note: Run as part of the BSP – Left Bulgaria coalition.)	Spas Panchev	505,527	15.40 (#2)	1 / 240	0	Opposition
2017 (Note: Run as part of the BSP for Bulgaria coalition.)	Spas Panchev	955,490	27.19 (#2)	1 / 240	0	Opposition
Apr 2021	Spas Panchev	480,146	14.79 (#3)	0 / 240	▼1	Extra-parliamentary
Jul 2021	Did not contest			0 / 240	0	Extra-parliamentary
Nov 2021	Did not contest			0 / 240	0	Extra-parliamentary
2022	Did not contest			0 / 240	0	Extra-parliamentary
2023 (Note: Run as part of The Left coalition.)	Spas Panchev	56,481	2.14 (#8)	0 / 240	0	Extra-parliamentary
Jun 2024	Spas Panchev	15,175	0.69 (#13)	0 / 240	0	Extra-parliamentary
Oct 2024	Did not contest			0 / 240	0	Extra-parliamentary
2026	Did not contest			0 / 240	0	Extra-parliamentary

=== European Parliament ===
Election	List leader	Votes	%	Seats	+/–	EP Group
2024 (Note: Run as part of The Left! coalition.)	Valeri Zhablyanov	10,230	0.51 (#14)	0 / 17	New	–
