= Bulgarian Democratic-Constitutional Party =

Bulgarian Democratic-Constitutional Party (in Bulgarian: Българска демократ-конституционна партия) was a right-wing political party in Bulgaria, led by Ivan Ambarev.

The party was founded in Plovdiv on January 3, 1990 as the Bulgarian Democratic-Monarchist Party (Българска демократ- монархическа партия). The name 'Bulgarian Democratic-Constitutional Party' was adopted on February 5, 1990. As of 1990, the party was led by a National Operations Centre, chaired by Ivan Ambarev. It had its headquarters in Plovdiv. Apart from Ambarev other party leaders included Alexander Dolev and Nikolay Buckov.

The party was registered on April 18, 1990.

In 1993 the party participated in the Federation of the Kingdom of Bulgaria coalition.
