= Nationalist Party of Bulgaria =

Nationalist Party of Bulgaria Националистическа партия на България
- Leader: Simeon Kostadinov
- Founded: 9 November 2013
- Dissolved: 2014
- Headquarters: Sofia, Bulgaria
- Ideology: Ultranationalism
- Political position: Far-right
- International affiliation: None
- Colours: Black, Yellow

The Nationalist Party of Bulgaria or NPB (Natzionalisticheska Partiya na Bulgaria) (Bulgarian: Националистическа партия на България), was a far-right nationalist political party in Bulgaria that was formed in 2013. Since then the party is believed to have carried out multiple attacks on illegal migrants and refugees within Bulgaria, however, these claims were never substantiated. Some commentators have compared it to the Golden Dawn party in Greece.
