= Left Union for a Clean and Holy Republic =

Left-wing nationalist electoral alliance in Bulgaria

Left Union for a Clean and Holy Republic Ляв съюз за чиста и свята република Lyav sŭyuz za chista i svyata republika
- Abbreviation: LSCHSR
- Leader: Ivan Atanasov
- Founder: Zhan Videnov
- Founded: 24 May 2021
- Ideology: Left-wing nationalism Socialism; Factions: Communism; Marxism–Leninism; National conservatism
- Political position: Left-wing to far-left
- Member parties: BPL; Bulgarian Way; BRSP; Che Guevara Movement; Left Alternative; PBK; Revival of the Fatherland
- Colours: Red
- National Assembly: 0 / 240

Website
- lschsr.com

The Left Union for a Clean and Holy Republic (Bulgarian: Ляв съюз за чиста и свята република, romanized: Lyav sŭyuz za chista i svyata republika, LSCHSR) was a Bulgarian left-wing nationalist electoral alliance which ran in the July 2021 Bulgarian parliamentary election.

== History ==
In May, 2021, former Bulgarian Prime Minister, Zhan Videnov, announced his intention to form a new party called "Left Alternative", justifying his decision by the poor electoral results of the Bulgarian Socialist Party. The party announced its intention to participate in a broad left-wing coalition during the upcoming parliamentary elections.

On the 23d of May, Videnov presented the alliance, composed of the following parties: Bulgarian Progressive Line, the Left Alternative, the Party of the Bulgarian Communists, the Socialist Party "Bulgarian Way", and the more conservative Revival of the Fatherland. Former BSP MP and Videnov ally, Ivan Atanasov, was selected as the alliance's leader, while Videnov assumed the role of organisational secretary.

== Election results ==
National Assembly of Bulgaria
Election	Votes	%	Seats	+/–	Government
2021 (July)	10,309	0.37	0 / 240	New	Extra-parliamentary
