= Alternative for Bulgarian Revival =

Political party in Bulgaria

Alternative for Bulgarian Revival Алтернатива за българско възраждане
- Abbreviation: ABV
- Leader: Rumen Petkov
- Founder: Georgi Parvanov
- Founded: 25 January 2014; 12 years ago
- Split from: Bulgarian Socialist Party
- Headquarters: Sofia, Bulgaria
- Ideology: Social democracy Social conservatism
- Political position: Centre-left
- National affiliation: BSP for Bulgaria (2021); Bulgarian Rise (2022–2023); The Left! (2023–2024); BSP – United Left (2024–)
- Colours: Maroon
- National Assembly: 0 / 240
- European Parliament: 0 / 17

Website
- abv-alternativa.bg

The Alternative for Bulgarian Revival (Bulgarian: Алтернатива за българско възраждане, romanized: Alternativa za balgarsko vazrazhdane, АБВ, ABV) is a centre-left political party in Bulgaria. ABV, the romanized party's initials in Bulgarian, are the first three letters of the Cyrillic alphabet, equivalent to ABC. A social-democratic party, it is pro-European, and holds "quasi-nationalist social conservative" views.

== History ==
The party was founded and is led by Georgi Parvanov, who was the president of Bulgaria from 2002 to 2012, as a splinter from the Bulgarian Socialist Party (BSP). In the May 2014 European Parliament election in Bulgaria, the party received 4% of the vote, failing to elect any Member of the European Parliament (MEP). In the 2014 Bulgarian parliamentary election, the party received 4.15% of the vote and 11 seats in the National Assembly.

== List of chairmen ==
No.	Name (birth–death)	Portrait	Term of office	
1	Georgi Parvanov (born 1957)		25 January 2014	15 January 2017
2	Konstantin Prodanov (born 1977)		15 January 2017	19 May 2018
3	Rumen Petkov (born 1961)		19 May 2018	Incumbent

== Election results ==
=== National Assembly ===
Election	Leader	Votes	%	Seats	+/–	Government
2014	Georgi Parvanov	136,223	4.15 (8th)	11 / 240	New	Coalition (2014-2016)
2014	Georgi Parvanov	136,223	4.15 (8th)	11 / 240	New	Opposition (2016-2017)
2017 (Note: Ran in coalition with Movement 21)	Konstantin Prodanov	54,412	1.55 (10th)	0 / 240	▼11	Extra-parliamentary
Apr 2021	Rumen Petkov	14,794	0.45 (14th)	0 / 240	0	Extra-parliamentary
Jul 2021 (Note: Ran as part of the BSP for Bulgaria coalition)	Rumen Petkov	365,695	13.22 (3rd)	0 / 240	0	Extra-parliamentary
Nov 2021	Rumen Petkov	267,817	10.07 (4th)	1 / 240	▲1	Coalition
2022 (Note: Ran as part of the Bulgarian Rise coalition)	Rumen Petkov	115,872	4.47 (7th)	1 / 240	0	Snap election
2023 (Note: Ran as part of The Left coalition)	Rumen Petkov	56,481	2.14 (8th)	0 / 240	▼1	Extra-parliamentary
Jun 2024	Rumen Petkov	15,175	0.69 (13th)	0 / 240	0	Extra-parliamentary
Oct 2024 (Note: Ran as part of the BSP – United Left coalition)	Rumen Petkov	184,403	7.32 (5th)	0 / 240	0	Extra-parliamentary
2026	Rumen Petkov	97,753	2.97 (8th)	0 / 240	0	Extra-parliamentary

=== President of Bulgaria ===
Election	No. of total votes (1st round)	% of popular vote (1st round)	Ranked (1st round)	No. of total votes (2nd round)	% of popular vote (2nd round)	Ranked (2nd round)
2016	125,531	3.28%	7th	–	–	–

=== European Parliament ===
Election	List leader	Votes	%	Seats	+/–	EP Group
2014	Ivailo Kalfin	90,061	4.02 (6th)	0 / 17	New	–
2019	Boyan Durankev	16,759	0.86 (13th)	0 / 17	0	–
2024 (Note: Ran as part of The Left! coalition)	Valeri Zhablyanov	10,230	0.51 (14th)	0 / 17	0	–

== See also ==
- List of political parties in Bulgaria
- Progressive Bulgaria
