= Gospodin Tonev =

Bulgarian politician (1955–2021)

Gospodin Tonchev Tonev
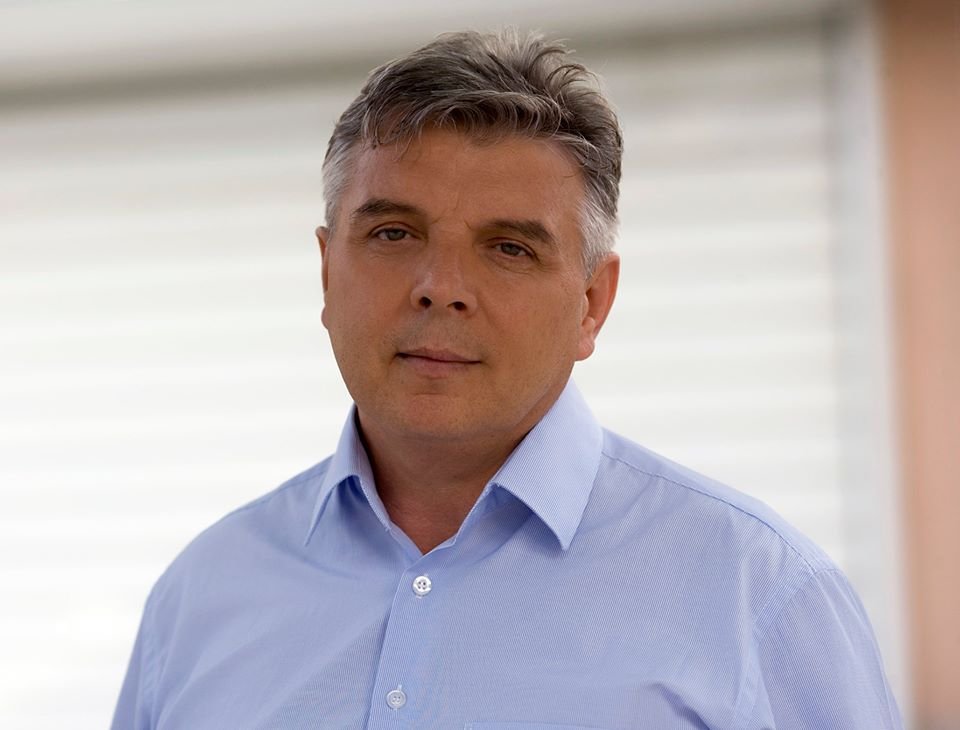

Personal details
- Born: 29 November 1955 Dimitrovgrad, Bulgaria
- Died: 5 September 2021 (aged 65) Sofia, Bulgaria
- Party: Independent (2008–2021) Union of Democratic Forces (before 2008) United Democratic Forces (before 2001)
- Profession: Politician, teacher, translator

Gospodin Tonchev Tonev (Bulgarian: Господин Тончев Тонев; 29 November 1955 – 5 September 2021) was a Bulgarian teacher, translator, and politician. He also lectured at seminars on the social market economy and the value foundations of politics. He is founder, owner and editor of the site "Values and Community".

== Biography ==
Tonev was born on 29 November 1955 in Dimitrovgrad. He graduated from the German language school in Burgas and earned a degree in German Studies at Sofia University "St. Kliment Ohridski", German literature. He is married with two children.

His political worldview came from the "open right" or conservative Christian Democracy. He presents ideas about the spiritual foundations and principles of the social market economy, and applying the principles of this ethical and economic model in Bulgaria.

He edited books about the origins and values of Christian Democracy:

"Tolerance is the soul of Europe" – a collection of speeches, articles and interviews of Federal Chancellor Angela Merkel, Compilation and Translation Mr. Tonev, published jointly by the Foundation "Konrad Adenauer", in 2009. The collection offers texts for the political rise of Angela Merkel and excerpts from its public statements in which she exposes their beliefs and values foundation of their activity as chancellor and president of the German Christian Democratic Union.

"What will save the economy" – The social market economy of Ludwig Erhard and its importance for the future. Mr. Tonev, compiler and translator of the book, together with the Foundation "Konrad Adenauer", in 2010. The book provides texts of personalities from different spheres of German public life essence and spiritual foundations of the social market economy for the beliefs and political activity of Ludwig Erhard.

== Political life ==
1997–2001, He was a member of the United Democratic front between 1997 and 2001, and from 2002 to 2008 part of the leadership of the Sazyuza democratic forces.

He entered the October 2014 Parliamentary Election as an Independent candidate, where he got 286 votes.

On 26 July 2016, the Bulgarian Democratic Union presented publicly the address "Honor and Justice" and announced the nomination of Mr. Tonev for President of the Republic. His running mate, Andrey Andreev, is a musicologist who heads the Philharmonic Orchestra of Plovdiv, Bulgaria's second-largest city, and several other institutions. He was also a lawmaker in a Great National Assembly in the 1990s and became one of the few MPs who refused to sign the new constitution. The Presidential pair was registered on 22 September 2016 for the 2016 Bulgarian Presidential Election.
