= Bulgarian Summer =

Bulgarian Summer Българско лято
- Abbreviation: GPBL
- Leader: Boril Sokolov
- Founded: 3 January 2021
- Succeeded by: Centre (de facto)
- Headquarters: 43 Moscow St., Sofia
- Ideology: Direct democracy; Populism; Soft Euroscepticism
- Political position: Centre
- Colors: Blue; Orange
- Slogan: «Justice for all» (Bulgarian: «Справедливост за всеки»)
- National Assembly: 0 / 240

Website
- gpbl.bg

Bulgarian Summer (Bulgarian: Българско лято, romanized: Balgarsko lyato; GPBL) is a political party and civic platform founded in 2021 by an initiative committee, headed by Boril Sokolov.

== History ==
The Bulgarian Summer civic platform emerged during the 2020 protests. It was officially established on January 3, 2021. The process was made entirely online due to the emergency pandemic situation and more than 900 people took part in the establishment. The party's registration in court has been challenged by the Prosecution, and due to this delay it failed to run in the April parliamentary elections. The Bulgarian National Unification was used as the mandator, winning 94,515 votes or 2.91%. In the early parliamentary elections in July, "Bulgarian Summer" officially appeared alone.

== Electoral results ==
National Assembly
Election	Votes	%	Seats	+/–	Government
Apr 2021	94,515	2.91 (#8)	0 / 240		Snap election
July 2021	49,833	1.80 (#9)	0 / 240		Snap election

- GPBL participated in the elections in April 2021 with the Bulgarian National Unification.
