= Bulgarian Euroright =

Political party in Bulgaria

Bulgarian Euroright (in Bulgarian: Българска евродесница) is a political party in Bulgaria, founded in Sofia June 30, 2000. The party is led by Аleiko Kiokchuiev.
