= Tatyana Doncheva =

Bulgarian politician (born 1960)

- Татяна Дончева
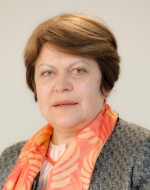

Personal details
- Born: 28 January 1960 (age 66) Tryavna, People's Republic of Bulgaria
- Party: BSP (before 2009); D21 (2010–present)
- Occupation: Politician; jurist

Tatyana Doncheva Toteva (Bulgarian: Татяна Дончева Тотева; born 28 January 1960) is a Bulgarian politician from the Movement 21 (D21) political party, of which she is the chairperson. Until 2009 a member of the Bulgarian Socialist Party (BSP), she has been a member of the 38th, 39th, 40th, and 45th National Assemblies.

== Early life and career ==
Doncheva was born on 28 January 1960 in Tryavna. Receiving an education in the field of legal studies (graduating from the juridical faculty of Sofia University), Doncheva has worked as a jurist, lawyer and prosecutor in Sofia. She is also a member of the Arbitration Commission of the Bulgarian Rhythmic Gymnastics Federation. In 2005, she was a candidate (backed by BSP and a number of other parties) to become mayor of the capital city, losing out to Boyko Borisov in the second decisive electoral round of the municipal elections.

After being unable to stake a strong enough claim for the leadership position of BSP at the party congress in October 2009, Doncheva founded the PP "Movement 21" in April 2010, which does not constitute a political party but represents the activism of citizens. Doncheva ran in the 2016 Bulgarian presidential election. She speaks English and Russian in addition to her native Bulgarian.

== Political views ==
Doncheva is a vocal opponent against corruption and argues in favor of reforms in Bulgaria's justice system. She raised concern about the anti-constitutional amendments to Bulgaria's Code of Criminal Procedure which were passed by the Bulgarian Parliament in August 2017. Doncheva was worried that the new changes create more possibilities for repression: for instance, one of the new provisions permits an investigation to be kept open indefinitely.

Previously, Doncheva had argued that Bulgaria's Prosecution acts like "a shah from the Middle Ages". She also warned that Bulgaria's Prosecutor General Sotir Tsatsarov abuses his office and attacks businessmen for personal reasons. In the summer of 2017, Doncheva suspected that Tsatsarov was working towards extending his already excessive powers through negotiations behind the curtain. Sotir Tsatsarov was subsequently nominated for sanctions under the US Magnitsky Act.
