= Party of the Bulgarian Communists =

Party of the Bulgarian Communists Партия на Българските комунисти
- Abbreviation: PBC (English); PBK (Bulgarian)
- Leader: Collective; Mincho Petrov Minchev; Ivan Krastev Ivanov; Vasil Petrov Kolarov
- Founded: 1999 (BCP-GD); 15 July 2006 (PBC)
- Headquarters: Sofia, Bulgaria
- Newspaper: Novo Rabotnichesko Delo
- Membership: 8,600 (2006)
- Ideology: Communism; Marxism-Leninism
- National affiliation: BSP – Left Bulgaria (2014); Left Union for a Clean and Holy Republic (2021); Neutral Bulgaria (2023–2024); Russophiles for Bulgaria (since 2024)
- European affiliation: INITIATIVE
- International affiliation: IMCWP
- Colours: Red
- National Assembly: 0 / 240
- European Parliament: 0 / 17

Website
- bgcomparty.co.nf (2017–2019)

The Party of the Bulgarian Communists (Bulgarian: Партия на Българските комунисти, romanized: Partiya na Bulgarskite Komunisti, PBK) is a Marxist-Leninist party in Bulgaria, registered in 2006.

The PBK was founded in February 1999 as the Bulgarian Communist Party "Georgi Dimitrov" (Bulgarian: Българска комунистическа партия "Георги Димитров, romanized: Bulgarska Komunisticheskaya Partiya "Georgi Dimitrov", BKP-GD) by the Initiative Committee for the Unification of the Communist Movement of Bulgaria. In January 2000 it was joined by the United Communist Party of Bulgaria (Bulgarian: Българска единна комунистическа партия, Bulgarska Edinna Komunisticheska Partiya, BEKP). In 2005 the Marxist Platform of BSP joined the BKP-GD which received its present name on 15 July 2006.

The party participated in the parliamentary elections of 1999 with the Alliance Coalition of Left Bulgaria which won 8,762 votes (0.2%) and no seats. In the local elections of 1999 the PBK won 36 seats and 18 mayoral posts. In 2003 it kept nine seats and five mayoral posts. In 2014 it took part in the parliamentary elections on the List of the BSP – Left Bulgaria winning no seat.

The PBK publishes the newspaper Novo Rabotnichesko Delo (Bulgarian: Ново работническо дело).

In the 2023 Bulgarian parliamentary election, the Party of the Bulgarian Communists participated in the coalition Neutral Bulgaria, which included the Bulgarian Communist Party and the far-right Attack party.
