= Bulgarian Communist Party (modern) =

Bulgarian Communist Party Българска комунистическа партия
- President: Zonka Zlatkova Spasova
- Founder: Vladimir Asenov Spasov
- Founded: 1990
- Split from: Bulgarian Socialist Party
- Preceded by: Party of the Working People
- Headquarters: Sofia
- Membership: 12,000 (2000)
- Ideology: Communism; Marxism-Leninism; Stalinism; Anti-revisionism
- Political position: Far-left
- National affiliation: Russophiles for Bulgaria (since 2024)
- International affiliation: ICOR
- National Assembly: 0 / 240
- European Parliament: 0 / 17

Website
- http://archivek-p.org/

The Bulgarian Communist Party (Bulgarian: Българска комунистическа партия, romanized: Balgarska komunisticheska partiya, BKP) is a Marxist-Leninist and Stalinist party in Bulgaria registered in 1990.

The BKP was founded on 25 April 1990 as the Party of the Working People (Bulgarian: Партия на трудовия народ, romanized: Partiya na Trudoviya Narod) which split from the Bulgarian Socialist Party. Renamed on 21 June 1990 the BKP proclaimed on 24 September 1990 claiming to be the successor of the original BKP.

The BKP took part in the parliamentary elections of 1991, 1994 and 1997, winning the best result in 1994 with 1,5%. In 2003, joint lists with the Communist Party of Bulgaria won 12 seats and five mayoral posts in local elections. The candidacy of the secretary general Vladimir Spasov for the 2006 presidential election failed because insufficient supporting signatures were collected.

The BKP cooperates with other Stalinist parties. In 1995, it hosted the foundation of a New Communist International. Today it is a member party of the International Coordination of Revolutionary Parties and Organizations.

Most recently, the party joined the Neutral Bulgaria coalition with the parties ATAKA, Russophiles for the Revival of the Fatherland and the Party of Bulgarian Communists.

The BKP published the newspaper Komunistichesko Delo (Bulgarian: комунистическо дело).

== See also ==
- List of anti-revisionist groups
