= Plamen Manushev =

Bulgarian politician

Plamen Ivanov Manushev
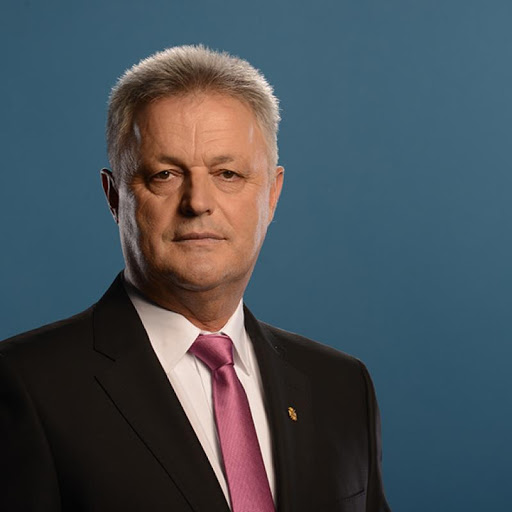
- Plamen Manushev

Personal details
- Born: 16 April 1954 (age 72) General Toshevo, Dobrich Province, Bulgaria
- Party: Bulgarian Communist Party (before 1989) GERB (2006–present)
- Profession: Politician

Plamen Ivanov Manushev (Bulgarian: Пламен Иванов Манушев; 16 April 1954, General Toshevo, Bulgaria) is a Bulgarian politician and retired Vice Admiral of the Bulgarian Navy.

== Education ==
Plamen Manushev received his secondary education at the Mathematics High School in Tolbuhin in 1972. That same year he joined the National Higher Naval School "N. Vaptsarov "in Varna. In 1977, he graduated from the Naval Academy and joined the ranks of the Bulgarian Army. From 1984 to 1986 he studied at the Naval Academy "A. A. Grechko" in Leningrad, RSFSR, USSR, yielding a degree "Master of warfare". In 1997 – 1998 he graduated from the Naval College (Naval War College) in Newport, Rhode Island, United States (with the status of General Staff Academy).

In addition to his native Bulgarian, he speaks English and Russian.

== Military career ==
His military career is as follows:

1977 – 1982 years – navigator and commander of mining torpedo warhead in Varna Naval Base; 1982 – 1984 years – the commander of the base tralchik VMB in Varna; 1986 – 1988 years – Chief of Staff of a separate division tralchitsi; 1988 – 1990 years – the commander of a separate division tralchitsi; 1990 – 1991 years – head of the department "Operative combat training" in the headquarters of VMB Varna; 1991 – 1992 years – Deputy Chief of Staff, he and the head of the department "Operations – combat training" in the headquarters of VMB Varna; 1992 – 1994 years – deputy chief, he's planning of combat training department of "combat training" in the headquarters of the Navy; 1994 – 1996 years – deputy commander of VMB Varna; 1996 – 1997 years – Chief of Staff of VMB Varna; 1998 – 2001 years – Chief of Staff of VMB Varna; 2001 – 2003 years – commander of VMB Varna; 2003 – 2007 years – Deputy Chief of General Staff of Naval Operations and Deputy Commander of the Navy; 2007 – 2009 years – defense attache of the Republic of Bulgaria in London, UK; 2009 – 2011 years – commander of the Navy; 2011 – 2012 years – deputy head of the Defense Ministry of Defence.

== Honours ==
Retired Vice Admiral Plamen Manushev has the following medals and awards: awarded the sign "For loyal service under the banner" II degree; awarded the sign "For loyal service under the banner" I degree; hunting rifle "Mazalat" medal "For Military Merit" I degree – awarded by President R. Plevneliev for long flawless service, contribution to the development and strengthening of the Bulgarian Army and contributions to the defense of the country (2012).

== Political activity ==
At the end of 2012 Plamen Manushev was appointed Deputy Regional Governor of Varna.

For the election of the representative at the 42nd National Assembly he was No. 3 GERB in Varna constituency. Elected MP in the 42nd National Assembly of the Republic of Bulgaria. Member of the parliamentary group of GERB, Foreign Affairs Committee, Committee on Defence Delegation to the NATO Parliamentary Assembly, Friendship group Bulgaria – UK Friendship group Bulgaria – India Friendship group Bulgaria – Kazakhstan Friendship group Bulgaria – Macedonia friendship group Bulgaria – Pakistan friendship group Bulgaria – Russia.

Elected MP in the 43th National Assembly of the Republic of Bulgaria constituency Varna. Chlen the parliamentary group of GERB, Foreign Affairs Committee, Committee on Defence Delegation to the NATO Parliamentary Assembly, Friendship group Bulgaria – Ukraine Group friendship Bulgaria – Afghanistan friendship group Bulgaria – Pakistan.
