= Rumen Petkov (politician) =

Bulgarian politician (born 1961)

- Румен Петков
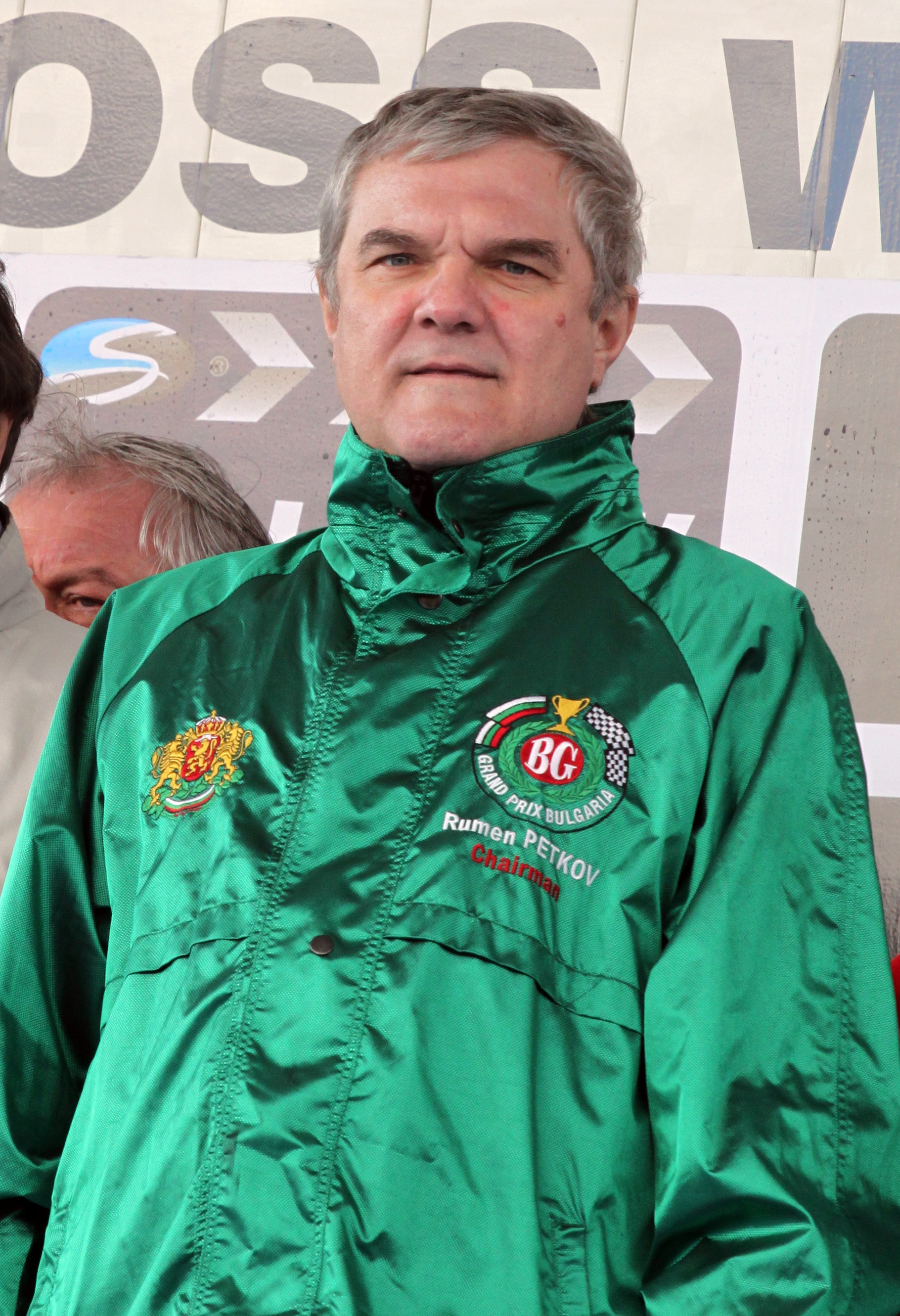
- Petkov in 2011

Minister of the Interior
- In office 17 August 2005 – 24 April 2008
- Prime Minister: Sergei Stanishev
- Preceded by: Georgi Petkanov
- Succeeded by: Mihail Mikov

Personal details
- Born: 23 June 1961 (age 65) Pleven, Bulgaria
- Party: Bulgarian Socialist Party (before 2014); Alternative for Bulgarian Revival (after 2014)
- Spouse: Galina Petkova
- Children: 2

Rumen Yordanov Petkov (Bulgarian: Румен Йорданов Петков) (born 23 June 1961) is a Bulgarian politician.

== Biography ==
Prior to turning to politics, Petkov received an education in mathematics, studying the subject at the mathematics high school in Pleven and Plovdiv University.

He served as mayor of Pleven between 1995 and 1999. Petkov was a member of the Bulgarian Socialist Party until 7 March 2014, but is currently affiliated with ABV.

Between August 2005 and April 2008, Petkov held the position of Minister of the Interior.

Petkov is married to Galina Ilieva Petkova and they have two sons named Bogdan and Philip.
