= Bulgarian National Unification =

Resistance Съпротива
- Leader: Georgi Georgiev-Goti
- Founder: Georgi Georgiev-Goti
- Founded: 1 December 2013
- Registered: 20 March 2014
- Merger of: Association of Bulgarian Pensioners; Bulgarian Criminal Detachment; Association of Argoecological Producers
- Headquarters: 8 Kokiche St., Sofia
- Ideology: Bulgarian nationalism; National conservatism; Euroscepticism
- Political position: Right-wing
- Colors: Blue
- Slogan: «Faith, home, family, country» («Вяра, дом, семейство, държава»)
- National Assembly: 0 / 240

Website
- bno-bg.com ppsaprotiva.com

The Resistance (Bulgarian: Съпротива, romanized: Saprotiva) is a Bulgarian nationalist political party. The leader of the party is chalga singer Georgi Georgiev-Goti.

Before 2014, the party was called Bulgarian National Unification (Bulgarian: Българско национално обединение, romanized: Bŭlgarsko natsionalno obedinenie; BNO)

== History ==
On December 1, 2013, the Association of Bulgarian Pensioners, Bulgarian Criminal Detachment, Association of Argoecological Producers and others. establish the Bulgarian National Unification party with Georgi Georgiev as chairman. The party describes itself as center-left and patriotic. BNO states that it will fight for a complete revision of the status quo, raising the standard of living by stimulating the economy and offering better conditions for small and medium-sized businesses.

On March 20, 2014, BNO was officially registered by the court.

BNO participated in several elections, but received more media attention in 2016, when it nominated Mityo Pishtova for presidential candidate. In 2019, Evgenia Baneva was nominated as an MEP, but soon after they withdrew their support for her.

In February 2021, BNO became a mandate holder and submitted its lists for the parliamentary elections in April to the Civil Platform "Bulgarian Summer", which was established by businessman Vasil Bozhkov.

=== Renaming ===
Prior to the October 2024 parliamentary elections, the party renamed itself to the name "Bulgars" (Bulgarian: Булгари, romanized: Bulgari). The party was once again renamed to "Resistance" prior to the 2026 Bulgarian parliamentary election.

== Electoral results ==
- BNO participated in the elections in April 2021 as a mandate holder of the Bulgarian Summer.

== Party logos ==
2016–2017 logo

2017–2021 logo

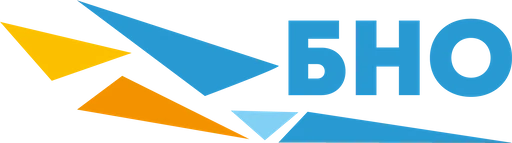
April 2021 electoral campaign logo, during which the candidates of the Bulgarian Summer marched inside the BNO

2021–2024 logo
