= Stand Up.BG =

Civic platform

Stand Up.BG Изправи се.БГ
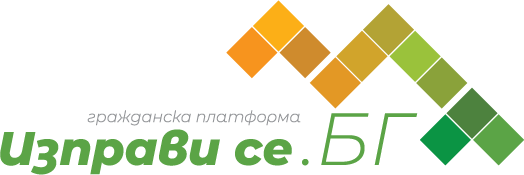
- Abbreviation: IS.BG, ISBG
- Leader: Maya Manolova
- Founded: 6 December 2019; 6 years ago
- Registered: 1 May 2022; 4 years ago
- Headquarters: 4th building, 3rd floor, Slaveikov Square, Sofia
- Ideology: Social liberalism
- Political position: Centre-left to left-wing
- National affiliation: Stand Up.BG! We are coming! (2021) The Left! (2023–2024) Solidary Bulgaria (2024) BSP – United Left (2024–2025)
- Colours: Green; Orange
- National Assembly: 0 / 240
- European Parliament: 0 / 17
- Municipalities: 2 / 265
- Sofia City Council: 1 / 61
- City councillors: 100 / 5,025

Website
- izpravise.bg

Stand Up.BG or Stand Up Bulgaria (Bulgarian: Изправи се.БГ, romanized: Izpravi se.BG) is a Bulgarian non-governmental organization and political party which was founded by Maya Manolova on December 6, 2019.

== History ==
On September 3, 2019, Maya Manolova resigned as national ombudswoman to Bulgaria to run for mayor of Sofia. Manolova founded Stand Up.BG on December 6 of that year. On May 23, 2020, Stand Up.BG organized a protest in front of the Council of Ministers which demanded the resignation of the government. At the protest, Manolova announced that she would run in the 2021 parliamentary election.

The organization participated in the country's anti-government protests. On August 31, 2020, Stand Up.BG announced that it would not become a political party; it would participate in elections as a partner network encompassing dozens of initiative committees from throughout the country. At the end of the year, an agreement on joint participation in the elections was signed with the Poisonous Trio (Otrovnoto trio). The leaders of Stand Up.BG and the Poisonous Trio announced on February 7, 2021, that they would not negotiate with GERB and DPS, and would run instead as a coalition entitled Stand Up! Mafia, Get Out!.

IS.BG joined the BSP – United Left electoral coalition in the run-up to the October 2024 election, but left the alliance in 2025 in opposition to the prospect of joining the government with GERB amongst others.

== 2020–2021 election campaign ==
- August 2020: Bulgaria for Citizens Movement president Dimitar Delchev announces the union of his party with Stand Up.BG during a public presentation in Slaveykov Square. Volt Bulgaria party chair Nastimir Ananiev and Movement 21 party chair Tatyana Doncheva does the same. The System Kills Us announces its support for Nikola Vaptsarov as their representative in Stand Up.BG.
- December 29, 2020: Poisonous Trio representative Nikolay Hadjigenov, signs an agreement to participate in the parliamentary elections with Stand Up.BG.
- January 6, 2021: The System Kills Us issues a statement refusing to support "any political or civic formation in the upcoming parliamentary elections that has anything to do with the so-called Poisonous Trio."
- January 17, 2021: In a Bulgarian National Television (BNT) interview, Maya Manolova says that Stand Up.BG "will never, and on no occasion, form a coalition with GERB."
- January 29, 2021: Volt Bulgaria leader Nastimir Ananiev says in a BNT interview that "a coalition will certainly be formed [by us]", and he "firmly excludes" GERB and the Bulgarian Socialist Party from any coalition with Stand Up.BG. Asked about a coalition with There Is Such a People, Ananiev replies, "If we unite in politics" and adds that "the people we can't work with ... are the hidden model that is currently governing. Officially ... that is GERB and the United Patriots, but in fact it is GERB and DPS."
- February 7, 2021: The leaders of Stand Up.BG and the Poisonous Trio announce that they will run together in the elections under the name "Stand Up! Mafia, Get Out!", and they refuse to negotiate with GERB and DPS.
- February 10, 2021: The Poisonous Trio sends an open letter to the chairs of There Is Such A People, Democratic Bulgaria, BSP and DPS, urging them not to "enter into an overt or covert coalition with Boyko Borisov and GERB" and to "negotiate and vote on texts that remove the prosecutor general from the judiciary and establish control mechanisms over the Prosecutor General of Bulgaria", "uphold the country's Euro-Atlantic orientation" and "defend the parliamentary republic."
- April 4, 2021: The coalition "Stand Up! Mafia Out!" receives 4.72% of the vote in the parliamentary elections or 150,940 votes, thus entering the 45th National Assembly of the Republic of Bulgaria with 14 seats.
- May, 2021: the parliamentary group of "Stand Up! Mafia Out!" with its leader Maya Manolova founds a parliamentary commission for revision of the government for the past 10 years which created a lot of public scandals related to revelations about corruption in Boyko Borissov's government

== Election results ==
=== National Assembly ===
In the snap April 2021 Bulgarian parliamentary election, the Stand Up! Mafia, Get Out! coalition finished in sixth place with 4.72 percent of the popular vote and 14 seats in the country's 45th National Assembly.

Election	Leader	Votes	%	Seats	+/–	Government
Apr 2021 (Note: Run as part of the Stand Up! Mafia, Get Out! coalition.)	Maya Manolova	150,940	4.72 (#6)	14 / 240	New	Snap election
Jul 2021	Maya Manolova	136,885	5.01 (#6)	13 / 240	▼1	Snap election
Nov 2021 (Note: Run as part of the Stand Up.BG! We are coming! coalition.)	Maya Manolova	60,055	2.29 (#8)	0 / 240	▼13	Extra-parliamentary
2022	Maya Manolova	25,207	1.01 (#9)	0 / 240	0	Extra-parliamentary
2023 (Note: Run as part of The Left! coalition.)	Maya Manolova	56,481	2.24 (#8)	0 / 240	0	Extra-parliamentary
Jun 2024 (Note: Run as part of the Solidary Bulgaria coalition.)	Maya Manolova	31,476	1.47 (#10)	0 / 240	0	Extra-parliamentary
Oct 2024 (Note: Run as part of the BSP – United Left coalition.)	Maya Manolova	184,403	7.56 (#5)	0 / 240	0	Snap election

=== European Parliament ===
Election	List leader	Votes	%	Seats	+/–	EP Group
2024 (Note: Run as part of the Solidary Bulgaria coalition.)	Vanya Grigorova	24,685	1.23 (#11)	0 / 17	New	–

=== President ===
Election	Candidate	First round			Second round		
Election	Candidate	Votes	%	Rank	Votes	%	Result
2026	Iliana Iotova	528,951	34.76	1st			TBA
