= Konstantin Bachiyski =

Bulgarian politician

- Константин Бачийски
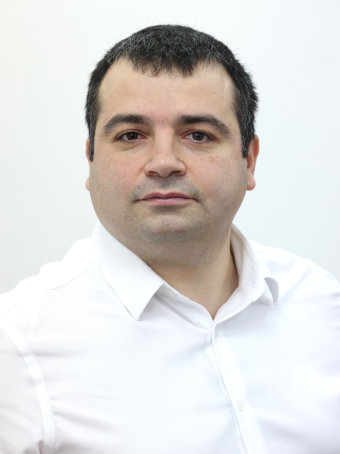

Member of the National Assembly
- In office 3 December 2021 – 19 June 2024
- Constituency: 2nd MMC - Burgas

Member of the Burgas City Council
- In office 28 October 2011 – 20 November 2021

Personal details
- Born: Konstantin Zhivkov Bachiyski; November 22, 1978 (age 47) Burgas, PR Bulgaria
- Party: Middle European Class
- Occupation: Politician

Konstantin Zhivkov Bachiyski (Bulgarian: Константин Живков Бачийски; 22 November 1978) is a Bulgarian politician and the chairman of the Middle European Class party. He has served as a municipal councillor for two terms representing the party in Burgas from 2015 to 2021. He has also been a member of the parliament, serving as a representative from the parliamentary group of "We Continue the Change" (PP) in the XLVII, XLVIII, and XLIX National Assemblies.

== Biography ==
Konstantin Bachiyski was born on 22 November 1978. He graduated from the Technical University of Sofia with specializations in telecommunications and business management.

During the European Parliament elections in 2014, Konstantin Bachiyski was a candidate on the list of the National Front for the Salvation of Bulgaria (NFSB). At that time, he was a member of the executive committee of the Middle European Class party.

In the local elections in 2015 he was elected as a municipal councillor representing the "Middle European Class" party.

In the local elections in 2019, Konstantin Bachiyski ran as a candidate for mayor of Burgas from the Middle European Class party (SEK) but was elected as a municipal councillor. He served in this position until the end of 2021 when he was elected as a member of the National Assembly.

On 17 September 2021, the chairman of SEK, Georgi Manev, authorized his deputy, Konstantin Bachiyski, to represent the party until the regular congress held on October 9.

The party, along with the VOLT party, became the official supporter of the newly created but unregistered political project "We Continue the Change" (Продължаваме промяната) led by Kiril Petkov and Asen Vassilev, enabling "We Continue the Change" to participate in the parliamentary elections in November 2021. Since then, Konstantin Bachiyski has been leading the list for "We Continue the Change" in Burgas for the parliamentary elections. He became a member of the National Assembly in the XLVII, XLVIII, and XLIX legislatures.
