= Nastimir Ananiev =

Volt Representative in the Bulgarian Parliament

- Настимир Ананиев

Member of the National Assembly
- In office 3 December 2021 – 19 June 2024
- Constituency: 23rd MMC - Sofia
- In office 12 November 2014 – 26 January 2017
- Constituency: 23rd MMC - Sofia

Personal details
- Born: 17 July 1975 (age 51) Sofia, PR Bulgaria
- Party: Volt Bulgaria
- Other political affiliations: Bulgaria for Citizens Movement (until 2018)
- Education: Griffith College; American University in Bulgaria; Harvard Kennedy School
- Website: Official website

Nastimir Ananiev (born 17 July 1975 in Sofia) is a Bulgarian politician. From 2014 to 2017 he represented the movement "Bulgaria of Citizens" in the Bulgarian National Assembly. In 2018, he founded Volt Bulgaria and stood for the party as a top candidate in the 2019 European elections. In 2021, he was elected to the National Assembly as his party's top candidate in the parliamentary elections in November 2021.

== Biography ==
Nastimir Ananiev was born in Sofia in 1975. Ananiev graduated from Griffith College in Ireland with a Bachelor's degree in Business Administration and from the American University in Bulgaria with a Master's degree in Business Administration. He is also a graduate of the Leadership, Organisation and Action programme at Harvard Kennedy School. From 1997 to 2008 he lived in Ireland and was 7 years Marketing Director for Central and Eastern Europe at the Griffith College Dublin. In 2012, he was a founding member of the Bulgaria for Citizens Movement. In 2014, he was elected as a member of the 43rd National Assembly as part of the Bulgaria of Citizens for Reformist Bloc movement, and served as chairman of the Transport, Information Technology and Communications Committee, among other positions. 2017, he left the Bulgaria of Citizens Movement and his position as deputy leader of the party due to the weak result of the 2017 parliamentary elections and the lack of personal responsibility of the leader Nayden Zelenogorski.

In 2018, he joined Volt Europa, a progressive and federalist European political alliance, and founded the Bulgarian chapter Volt Bulgaria, of which he subsequently became chairman. He was Volt's top candidate in the 2019 European elections, as well as in the 3 parliamentary elections in 2021 (In April and July as part of the alliance Stand up BG! Mafia out! and in November as part of the coalition We Continue the Change). In November 2021, he was re-elected as MP for Volt on the We Continue Change list. He was re-elected for his third and fourth terms in the 2022 and 2023 parliamentary elections and has been the only Volt Bulgaria MP in parliament since the last election.

== Political positions ==
Ananiev campaigns against corruption and the misuse of EU funding programmes in Bulgaria. He also considers old-age poverty and the poor health system in Bulgaria to be the country's biggest challenges. In 2019, Ananiev organised protests against the planned electoral reform, fearing that it would make it easier to rig elections. He is also campaigning for easier voting for Bulgarians living abroad.

He supports the introduction of the euro in Bulgaria.

== Controversies ==
On April 10, 2024, offices associated with companies linked to Ananiev were raided by the Bulgarian police and Gendarmerie at the request of Belgium. According to the Sofia City Prosecutor's office, the action was targeting an organized criminal group involved in drug trafficking and money laundering.

According to Ananiev, the action had a political motivation, as Ananiev had a strong emphasis that the media agency PIK - which is widely known for reporting on fake news, that usually aim to be right-wing biased attempted to create a "political bat".
