= Iva Miteva =

Bulgarian lawyer and politician

- Ива Митева
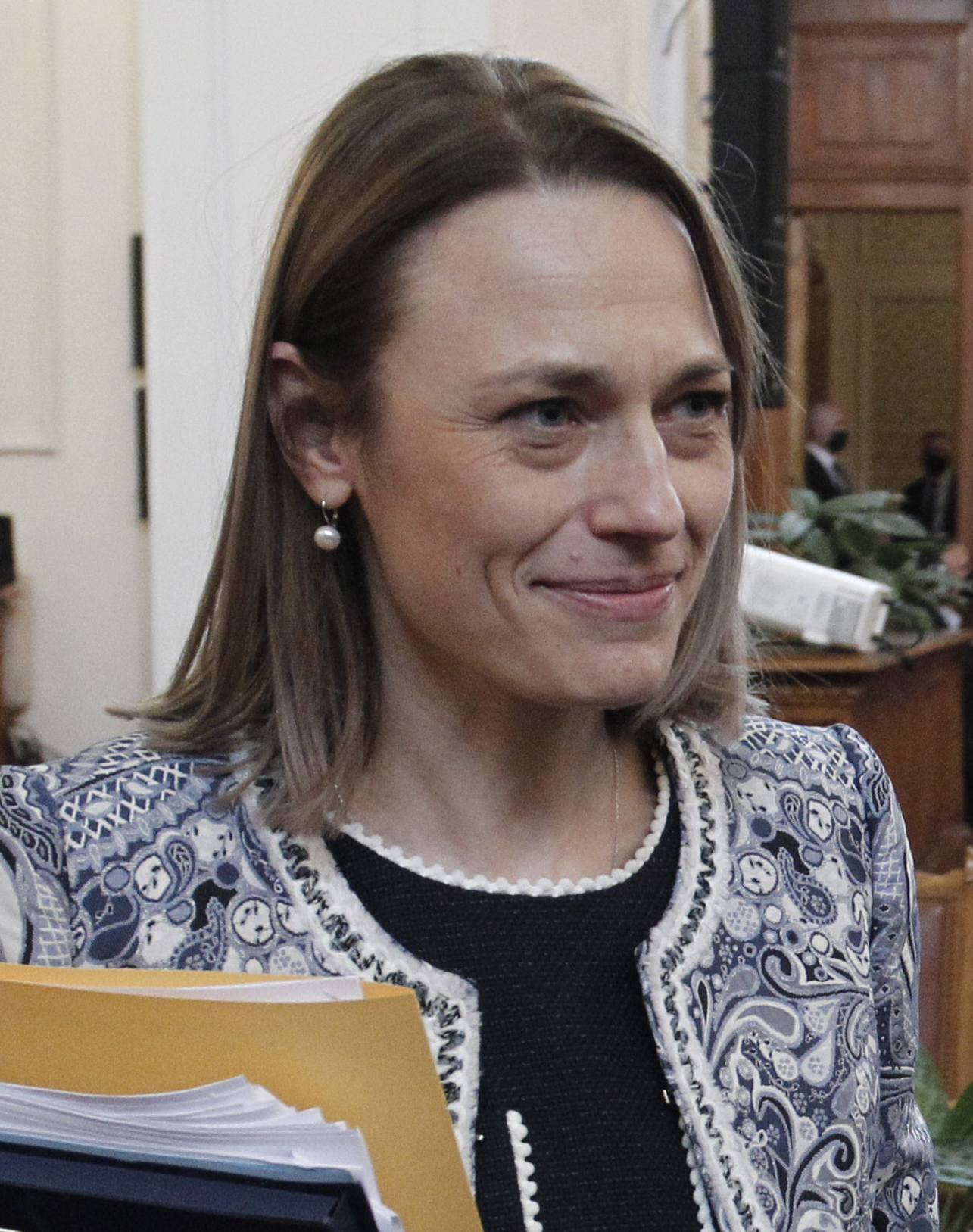
- Miteva in 2021

Chairperson of the National Assembly
- In office 21 July 2021 – 16 September 2021
- Succeeded by: Nikola Minchev
- In office 15 April 2021 – 12 May 2021
- Preceded by: Tsveta Karayancheva

Personal details
- Born: 25 October 1972 (age 53) Razgrad, People's Republic of Bulgaria
- Citizenship: Bulgarian
- Party: There Is Such a People
- Occupation: Lawyer

Iva Miteva Yordanova-Rupcheva (born 25 October 1972) is a Bulgarian lawyer and politician who was the Speaker of the 45th National Assembly and the 46th National Assembly.

== Early life and education ==
Miteva was born in Razgrad on October 25, 1972 and graduated from Sofia University in 1996. She is undertaking a doctoral thesis through the Bulgarian Academy of Sciences.

== Career ==
Miteva began her career at the Ministry of Justice in 1998. She worked for the Committee on Legal Affairs before leading the Parliament's EU Legislature and Law Directorate. She has been involved in writing parliamentary rules, drafting changes to the Electoral Code and proposing amendments to the Constitution. She is also a lecturer at the New Bulgarian University in the Department of Law.

Miteva is a member of the There Is Such A People party and was elected to the National Assembly in 2020 as one of 23 members for the constituency in Sofia. She was elected Speaker of the 45th National Assembly on 15 April 2021, at the first session of Parliament after the April 4 election at which no party won the majority needed to form government on its own. Miteva was elected by what President Rumen Radev called a "fragmented" parliament expressing voters' desire for change with 163 votes in favour and 75 abstentions, all from the GERB Party who voted for their own candidate and former Speaker Tsveta Karayancheva. Miteva said that "transparency and accountability" must be the guiding principles for the Assembly, quoting Bulgarian National Revival figure Todor Ikonomov. Miteva is the third woman to hold the position of Speaker. In the second sitting of the new assembly, Miteva presided over a vote to approve the resignation of Prime Minister Boyko Borisov's government.

On 21 July 2021 she was reelected as Speaker of the 46th National Assembly.
