= April 2021 Bulgarian parliamentary election =

- 4 April 2021
- All 240 seats in the 45th National Assembly; 121 seats needed for a majority
- Turnout: 49.10% (▼4.75pp)
Party	Leader	Vote %	Seats	+/–
GERB–SDS	Boyko Borisov	26.18	75	−20
ITN	Slavi Trifonov	17.66	51	New
BSPzB	Korneliya Ninova	15.01	43	−37
DPS	Mustafa Karadayi	10.51	30	+4
DB	A. Atanasov & H. Ivanov	9.45	27	+27
ISMV	M. Manolova & N. Hadjigenov	4.72	14	New
This lists parties that won seats. See the complete results below.

Prime Minister before	Prime Minister after
Boyko Borisov; GERB (Third Borisov Government)	Stefan Yanev; Independent (First Yanev Government)

Parliamentary elections were held in Bulgaria on 4 April 2021 at the end of the term of the National Assembly elected in 2017. Parties in the governing coalition led by Boyko Borisov lost seats and no party leader was able to form a coalition government within the time limit. This triggered the July 2021 Bulgarian parliamentary election.

== Electoral system ==
The 240 members of the National Assembly are elected by open list proportional representation from 31 multi-member constituencies ranging in size from 4 to 16 seats. The electoral threshold is 4% for parties, with seats allocated using the largest remainder method.

== Parties and coalitions ==
The incumbent government was a coalition between the conservative GERB party of Prime Minister Boyko Borisov and the nationalist United Patriots alliance (formed from IMRO, Attack and the NFSB), with the support of the populist Volya Movement. Together they held 132 out of 240 seats in the National Assembly.

During The Greens' 2020 national meeting, the party representatives voted in favor of a coalition at "the next parliamentary election with the other two members of Democratic Bulgaria". The party representatives voted against a "coalition with any of the political parties in the current National Assembly" - namely, GERB, BSP, DPS, Volya and OP.

The deputy chairman of ITN, Toshko Yordanov, said in an interview for the Bulgarian National Radio, that the party "will not enter a coalition with GERB, DPS or BSP".

The cochairman of Democratic Bulgaria, Hristo Ivanov, stated in an interview for bTV, that "there will be no coalition with GERB, whether with or without Borisov".

The chairman of Bulgaria for Citizens Movement, Dimitar Delchev, announced that his party was joining Stand Up.BG during a public presentation of the citizens' platform at Slaveykov Square, in August 2020. The same was done by the chairman of Volt Bulgaria - Nastimir Ananiev, as well as the chairman of the party Movement 21 - Tatyana Doncheva. The citizens' organization The System Kills Us announced their support for Nikola Vaptsarov as their representative within Stand Up.BG.

=== List ===
When only some of the leaders of a coalition are its official representatives, their names are in bold. All lines with a light gray background indicate support for a party or coalition that has been agreed upon outside of the official CEC electoral registration.

Name			Ideology	Leader(s)	2017 result		Seats at dissolution
Name			Ideology	Leader(s)	Votes (%)	Seats	Seats at dissolution
**GERB–SDS**	**GERB**	Citizens for European Development of Bulgaria	Conservatism; Populism	**Boyko Borisov**	32.65	95 / 240	94 / 240
**GERB–SDS**	**SDS**	Union of Democratic Forces	Conservatism; Christian democracy	Rumen Hristov	32.65	95 / 240	94 / 240
**GERB–SDS**	**DEN**	Movement for the Unity of the People	Turkish minority interests	Mehmed Dikme	32.65	95 / 240	94 / 240
**BSP** **for Bulgaria**	**BSP**	Bulgarian Socialist Party	Social democracy Democratic socialism	**Korneliya Ninova**	27.19	80 / 240	69 / 240
**BSP** **for Bulgaria**	**NZ**	New Dawn	Left-wing nationalism	Mincho Minchev	27.19	80 / 240	69 / 240
**BSP** **for Bulgaria**	**CPB**	Communist Party of Bulgaria	Communism; Marxism–Leninism	Aleksandar Paunov	27.19	80 / 240	69 / 240
**BSP** **for Bulgaria**	–	Ecoglasnost	Green politics Environmentalism	Emil Georgiev	27.19	80 / 240	69 / 240
**BSP** **for Bulgaria**	**Trakiya**	Trakiya Political Club	Bulgarian nationalism	Stefan Nachev	27.19	80 / 240	69 / 240
**VMRO**	**IMRO–** **BNM**	IMRO – Bulgarian National Movement	Bulgarian ultranationalism National conservatism	**Krasimir Karakachanov**	9.07 (OP)	12 / 240	13 / 240
**VMRO**	**ROD**	Association „ROD International“	Conservatism	David Alexandrov	9.07 (OP)	12 / 240	13 / 240
**VMRO**	**SEK**	Middle European Class	Pro-Europeanism	Georgi Manev	9.07 (OP)	12 / 240	13 / 240
**VMRO**	**SPSZ**	Union of Patriotic Forces "Defense"	Bulgarian nationalism	Petar Beron	9.07 (OP)	12 / 240	13 / 240
**VMRO**	**ZS-AS**	Agrarian Union "Aleksandar Stamboliyski"	Agrarianism; Progressivism	Spas Panchev	9.07 (OP)	12 / 240	13 / 240
**Ataka**		Attack	Bulgarian ultranationalism Right-wing populism	Volen Siderov	9.07 (OP)	6 / 240	6 / 240
**DPS**		Movement for Rights and Freedoms	Liberalism; Turkish minority interests	Mustafa Karadayi	8.99	26 / 240	25 / 240
**Patriotic**; **Coalition**; **Volya–NFSB**	**Volya**	Volya Movement	Right-wing populism Anti-establishment	**Veselin Mareshki**	4.15	21 / 240	21 / 240
**Patriotic**; **Coalition**; **Volya–NFSB**	**NFSB**	National Front for the Salvation of Bulgaria	Bulgarian nationalism National conservatism	**Valeri Simeonov**	4.15	21 / 240	21 / 240
**Patriotic**; **Coalition**; **Volya–NFSB**	**OSD**	United Social Democracy	Social democracy	Jordan Gergov	4.15	21 / 240	21 / 240
**Patriotic**; **Coalition**; **Volya–NFSB**	**BSDP**	Bulgarian Social Democratic Party	Social democracy	Yordan Nihrizov	4.15	21 / 240	21 / 240
**Patriotic**; **Coalition**; **Volya–NFSB**	**CDP**	Christian Democratic Party of Bulgaria	Christian democracy	Irina Arabadzhieva	4.15	21 / 240	21 / 240
**Patriotic**; **Coalition**; **Volya–NFSB**	**RDP**	Radical Democratic Party in Bulgaria	Liberalism	Zahari Petrov	4.15	21 / 240	21 / 240
**Patriotic**; **Coalition**; **Volya–NFSB**	**BDSR**	Bulgarian Democratic Union "Radicals"	Agrarianism; Conservatism	Tsvetan Manchev	4.15	21 / 240	21 / 240
**Patriotic**; **Coalition**; **Volya–NFSB**	**BZNS**	Bulgarian Agrarian National Union	Agrarianism; Centrism	Nikolay Nenchev	4.15	21 / 240	21 / 240
**Patriotic**; **Coalition**; **Volya–NFSB**	**SBDR**	Association "Bulgarian Homemade Brandy"	Farmers' rights	Petko Sabev	4.15	21 / 240	21 / 240
**GN**		People's Voice	Eurorealism; Populism	Svetoslav Vitkov	3.06 (RB)	0 / 240	0 / 240
**DB**	**DSB**	Democrats for a Strong Bulgaria	National liberalism Pro-Europeanism	**Atanas Atanasov**	3.06 (RB)	0 / 240	0 / 240
**DB**	**DaB!**	Yes, Bulgaria!	Anti-corruption; Civic engagement	**Hristo Ivanov**	2.88	0 / 240	0 / 240
**DB**	**ZD**	Green Movement	Green politics Green liberalism	Borislav Sandov; Vladislav Panev	2.88	0 / 240	0 / 240
**DB**	**DEN**	Dignity of United People	Liberalism	Nayden Zelenogorski	2.88	0 / 240	0 / 240
**ABV**		Alternative for Bulgarian Revival	Social democracy Social conservatism	Rumen Petkov	1.55	0 / 240	0 / 240
**Revival**		Revival	Bulgarian nationalism Anti-corruption	Kostadin Kostadinov	1.08	0 / 240	0 / 240
**Greens**		Party of the Greens	Green politics Anti-capitalism	Vladimir Nikolov	0.29	0 / 240	0 / 240
**Together** **for Change**	**BSDE**	Bulgarian Social Democracy – EuroLeft	Social democracy Third Way	Aleksandar Tomov; **Dimitar Mitev**	0.17; KN)	0 / 240	0 / 240
**Together** **for Change**	**ESI**	European Security and Integration	Romani minority interests Social democracy	Toma Tomov	0.17; KN)	0 / 240	0 / 240
**Together** **for Change**	**R 2000**	Patriotism 2000	Patriotism	Julian Ivanov	0.17; KN)	0 / 240	0 / 240
**BNO**	**BNO**	Bulgarian National Unification	Bulgarian nationalism	**Georgi Georgiev**	0.11	0 / 240	0 / 240
**BNO**	**GPBL**	Civic Platform „Bulgarian Summer“	Populism	Boris Sokolov	0.11	0 / 240	0 / 240
**Citizens** **of Protest**	**BL**	Bulgarian Left	Socialism; Democratic socialism	Boyan Kirov	0.08	0 / 240	0 / 240
**Citizens** **of Protest**	**KOY**	Competence, Responsibility and Truth	Right-wing	**Svetozar Saev**	0.08	0 / 240	0 / 240
**Citizens** **of Protest**	**BZP**	Bulgarian Agrarian Party	Agrarianism	**Peycho Kasarov**	0.08	0 / 240	0 / 240
**Citizens** **of Protest**	**SKB**	Union of Communists in Bulgaria	Communism; Marxism	Pavel Ivanov	0.08	0 / 240	0 / 240
**We,** **the Citizens**	**KtB**	Coalition For you Bulgaria	Pro-Europeanism; Centre-right	Valeri Grigorov	–	0 / 240	0 / 240
**We,** **the Citizens**	**BDO**	Bulgarian Democratic Union	Christian democracy	Gospodin Tonev	–	0 / 240	0 / 240
**BNU–ND**		Bulgarian National Union – New Democracy	Neo-Nazism; Racism; Hard Euroscepticism	Boris Ivanov; Bogdan Yotsov	–	0 / 240	0 / 240
**KOD**		Conservative Union of the Right	National conservatism	Petar Moskov	–		0 / 240
**BPL**		Bulgarian Progressive Line	Democratic socialism Progressivism	Krasimir Yankov	–		5 / 240
**VO**		Revival of the Fatherland	Conservatism; Russophilia	Nikolay Malinov	–		0 / 240
**Nation**		Nation	Right-wing populism Hard euroscepticism	Kiril Gumnerov	–		0 / 240
**MIR**		Morality, Initiative, Patriotism	Conservatism	Simeon Slavchev	–		0 / 240
**ISMV**	**D21**	Movement 21	Social democracy Environmentalism	Tatyana Doncheva	–		0 / 240
**ISMV**	**DBG**	Bulgaria for Citizens Movement	Centrism	Dimitar Delchev	–		0 / 240
**ISMV**	**ENP**	United People's Party	Liberalism; Pro-Europeanism	Valentina Vasileva-Filadelfevs	–		0 / 240
**ISMV**	**IS.BG**	Stand Up.BG	Anti-corruption; Anti-elitism	**Maya Manolova**	–		0 / 240
**ISMV**	**OT**	Poisonous Trio and Citizens	Direct democracy Populism	**Nikolay Hadjigenov**	–		0 / 240
**ISMV**	**VOLT**	Volt Bulgaria	Pro-Europeanism; European federalism	Nastimir Ananiev	–		0 / 240
**ISMV**	**DNES**	Movement for National Unity and Salvation	Social liberalism	Angelica Tsokova	–		0 / 240
**ISMV**	**ZNS**	Agrarian People's Union	Agrarianism	Rumen Yonchev	–		0 / 240
**DNK**		Movement of Independent Candidates	Populism	Boyko Mladenov; Boyko Nikiforov; Mincho Kuminev; Ognyan Boyukliev	–		0 / 240
**RzB**		Republicans for Bulgaria	Conservatism; Economic liberalism	Tsvetan Tsvetanov	–		1 / 240
**Pravoto**		Rights, Reforms, Alternative, Opportunities, Responsibility, Tolerance and Unity	Populism	Maria Koleva	–		0 / 240
**BOG**		Prosperity-Unity-Construction	Patriotism	Ivan Gaberov	–		0 / 240
**ONB**	**ONB**	Society for New Bulgaria	Conservatism	**Kalin Krulev**	–		0 / 240
**ONB**	**ZM**	NGO "Green Mladost"	Green politics	Desislava Ivancheva	–		0 / 240
**BSDD**		Bulgarian Union for Direct Democracy	Direct democracy	Georgi Nedelchev	–		0 / 240
**ITN**		There Is Such A People	Populism; Direct democracy	Slavi Trifonov	–		0 / 240
**PD**		Direct Democracy	Direct democracy	Peter Klisarov	–		0 / 240
**Independents**		–	–	–	0.15	0 / 240	19 / 240

== Opinion polls ==
The opinion poll results below were recalculated from the original data and exclude pollees that chose 'I will not vote' or 'I am uncertain'.

Polling firm	Fieldwork date	Sample size	Margin of error	GERB	BSP	DPS	OP (Note: Percentages might not include Ataka's results, as they left the coalition around mid-2019.)	DB	Volya	ITN	ISMV	Others / None	Lead
Alpha Research (voters)	26 Feb–1 Mar 2021	1,013	–	28.5% (Note: In an electoral alliance with SDS.)	23.2%	12.5%	3.7% (Note: IMRO-BNM only.)	5.7%	1.8% (Note: In an electoral alliance with NFSB.)	13.3%	4.5%	6.8%	5.3%
Mediana	22–26 Feb 2021	943	–	27.5%	24.2%	10.7%	4.0%	4.2%	3.1%	15.2%	5.0%	6.1%	3.3%
Market Links (voters)	17–24 Feb 2021	1,019	–	24.6%	18.9%	8.5%	2.7%	7.6%	–	13.0%	3.9%	20.8%	5.7%
Trend (voters)	12–19 Feb 2021	1,008	± 3.1%	28.9%	24.1%	11.1%	3.8%	6.2%	2.6%	12.9%	4.0%	6.4%	4.8%
Gallup (voters)	4–12 Feb 2021	1,011	± 3.1%	25.8%	21.9%	12.4%	4.2%	6.8%	2.7%	13.1%	4.7%	8.4%	3.9%
Market Links (voters)	23–31 Jan 2021	500	–	28.6%	20.9%	11.9%	3.4%	10.7%	–	15.5%	5.3%	3.8%	7.7%
Market Links (all)	23–31 Jan 2021	1,000	–	25.5%	22.5%	11.2%	4.3%	8%	–	18.1%	6.6%	3.8%	3%
Trend (voters)	12–19 Jan 2021	1,008	± 3.1%	27.6%	24.9%	10.3%	4%	6%	1.3%	11.8%	4.1%	10%	2.7%
Gallup (voters)	7–15 Jan 2021	1,010	± 3.1%	25.6%	21.4%	12.2%	5.1%	6.9%	2.3%	13.8%	5%	7.6%	4.2%
Alpha Research (voters)	15–21 Dec 2020	504	–	29%	26.2%	8.6%	3.2%	7.3%	–	12.2%	5.9%	7.6%	2.8%
Mediana	12–17 Dec 2020	954	–	24.2%	25.7%	10.8%	4.7%	3.4%	1.6%	17%	4.8%	7.8%	1.5%
Exacta	5–12 Dec 2020	1,025	–	28.8%	25.6%	8.4%	5.4%	6%	–	14%	3.7%	8.1%	3.2%
Barometer	24–29 Nov 2020	847	–	33.5%	20.8%	13.2%	12.7%	5.2%	1.2%	6.2%	2.5%	4.8%	12.7%
Barometer	6–11 Nov 2020	882	–	33.6%	21.6%	12.3%	12%	5.1%	1.1%	6.1%	2.6%	5.7%	12%
Sova Harris	27 Oct–3 Nov 2020	1,000	± 3.1%	26.6%	25.1%	8.7%	5.5%	8.4%	3.2%	11.4%	5.7%	5.4%	1.5%
Rego (voters)	21–27 Oct 2020	2,000	–	27.1%	26.3%	8.3%	2.8%	7.6%	1.1%	18.6%	3.9%	4.3%	0.8%
Specter (voters)	12–16 Oct 2020	1,016	–	22.9%	21.8%	10.4%	3.4%	12.2%	0.8%	16.1%	3.5%	8.9%	1.1%
Barometer	10–16 Oct 2020	866	–	32.7%	23.6%	12.4%	11.3%	4.7%	1.1%	6.1%	2.7%	5.3%	9.1%
Trend (voters)	3–10 Oct 2020	1,008	± 3.1%	24.1%	23.6%	10.2%	3.8%	8.8%	1.6%	15.9%	3.9%	8.1%	0.5%
Gallup	1–9 Oct 2020	803	± 3.5%	19.1%	19.8%	10.1%	3.4%	7.3%	2.6%	12.6%	3.7%	21.4%	0.7%
Alpha Research (voters)	21–30 Sep 2020	1,031	–	22.8%	21.8%	11%	4.2%	10.5%	0.3%	16.6%	5.1%	7.7%	1%
Market Links (voters) (Note: The original source data had percentages that totaled 100.2 due to rounding. Due to a lack of better data, the same is true for the recalculated percentages.)	18–26 Sep 2020	544	–	27.4%	27.2%	9.9%	2.7%	11.8%	–	13.5%	3.1%	4.4%	0.2%
Market Links (all)	18–26 Sep 2020	1,058	–	24.6%	25.5%	11.7%	2.8%	10%	–	17%	4.2%	4.2%	0.9%
Gallup	3–11 Sep 2020	807	± 3.5%	18.6%	19%	10.7%	3.8%	7.3%	2.5%	11.7%	3.1%	22.6%	0.4%
Trend (voters)	29 Aug–5 Sep 2020	1,008	± 3.1%	23.8%	23.4%	10.4%	3.9%	9.9%	1.2%	15.9%	4%	7.5%	0.4%
Sova Harris	19–25 Aug 2020	1,000	± 3.1%	27.7%	24.5%	9.2%	4.4%	7%	3%	15.7%	4.5%	4%	3.2%
Barometer	3–11 Aug 2020	842	–	38.9%	18.9%	12.2%	11.7%	4.8%	1.7%	5.3%	1.9%	4.5%	20%
Trend (voters)	3–10 Aug 2020	1,010	± 3.1%	24.2%	22.9%	9.8%	4.1%	10.1%	1.2%	14.9%	4.4%	8.4%	1.3%
Gallup	30 Jul–7 Aug 2020	811	± 3.5%	20%	19.1%	9.4%	3.2%	7.9%	2.2%	10.9%	3.3%	24.1%	0.9%
CAM	1–5 Aug 2020	1,021	± 3.1%	30.1%	19.7%	10.8%	4.3%	10.1%	2.1%	13.9%	5%	3.9%	10.4%
Market Links (voters)	28 Jul–3 Aug 2020	573	–	26.3%	24.7%	10.5%	5%	12.8%	–	13.8%	2.5%	4.5%	1.6%
Market Links (all)	28 Jul–3 Aug 2020	1,093	–	23.3%	20.7%	9.6%	4.6%	10.1%	–	23%	4%	4.7%	0.3%
Gallup	Jul 2020	–	± 3.5%	27.4%	25.7%	8.5%	4.4%	3.2%	2.4%	8.6%	1.8%	17.9%	1.7%
Alpha Research	23–30 Jul 2020	1,017	–	26.7%	19.2%	8.3%	4.1%	12.3%	0.9%	18.8%	5.9%	3.9%	7.5%
Sova Harris	26 Jun–1 Jul 2020	1,000	–	37.4%	21.4%	7.7%	7.5%	4.2%	4.2%	9.1%	2.6%	5.8%	16%
Gallup	Jun 2020	–	± 3.5%	29%	23.1%	7.9%	3.8%	3.2%	2.4%	7%	2.4%	21.3%	5.9%
Barometer	20–25 Jun 2020	828	–	37.5%	20.4%	11.2%	10.1%	3.4%	1.5%	3.8%	1.7%	10.5%	17.1%
Market Links (voters)	27 May–3 Jun 2020	483	–	34.1%	25.6%	9.8%	3.7% (Note: Results of IMRO only, no information on NFSB's results, which are probably counted as 'Others'.)	8.5%	–	9.8%	–	8.5%	8.5%
Alpha Research	28 Apr–5 May 2020	1,000	–	33.4%	19.6%	10.3%	6.3%	5.9%	1.6%	14.6%	–	8.2%	13.8%
Mediana	21–28 Feb 2020	1,008	–	29.4%	25.7%	13.3%	5.8%	2.7%	1.9%	12.9%	–	8.3%	3.7%
Barometer	27 Feb 2020	–	–	35.2%	24%	10.5%	9%	3.1%	1.4%	3.7%	1.6%	11.5%	11.2%
Trend	3–10 Feb 2020	1,007	± 3.1%	30.6%	27.3%	10.1%	3.9%	6%	2%	10.7%	–	9.4%	3.3%
Barometer (voters)	9–13 Jan 2020	873	–	35.5%	28.2%	11%	11%	3.2%	–	3.6%	–	7.5%	7.3%
Alpha Research	5–12 Dec 2019	1,017	–	29.8%	25%	10.7%	7.3%	7%	2.1%	11.8%	–	6.2%	4.8%
Market Links (voters)	21–28 Nov 2019	448	–	29.4%	29.4%	8.2%	5.9%	10.6%	2.4%	10.6%	–	4.7%	Tie
Market Links (all)	21–28 Nov 2019	980	–	28.6%	25.4%	12.7%	6.3%	7.9%	1.6%	12.7%	–	3.2%	3.2%
Trend	7–15 Nov 2019	1,008	± 3.1%	35.6%	27.5%	10.3%	5.1%	4.6%	1.8%	7.6%	–	7.3%	8.1%
Alpha Research	10–16 Sep 2019	1,023	–	29.6%	25.8%	11.8%	6.6%	5.6%	2.8%	11.4%	–	6.3%	3.8%
Market Links (voters)	11–19 Jun 2019	429	–	34.9%	33%	9.1%	6.8%	6%	3.8%	–	–	6.4%	1.9%
Trend	5–12 Jun 2019	1,008	± 3.1%	36.7%	29.1%	10.9%	7.6%	5.1%	1.8%	–	–	8.8%	7.6%

== Results ==
Party	Votes	%	+/–	Seats	+/–
GERB–SDS	837,707	25.80	–6.9	75	–20
There Is Such A People	565,014	17.40	New	51	New
BSP for Bulgaria	480,146	14.79	–12.4	43	–37
Movement for Rights and Freedoms	336,306	10.36	+1.4	30	+4
Democratic Bulgaria	302,280	9.31	+4.0	27	+27
Stand Up! Mafia, Get Out!	150,940	4.65	New	14	New
IMRO – Bulgarian National Movement	116,434	3.59	New	0	–12
Bulgarian National Unification	94,515	2.91	New	0	New
Revival	78,414	2.41	+1.3	0	0
Patriotic Coalition (Volya–NFSB)	75,926	2.34	–1.8	0	–9
Republicans for Bulgaria	42,057	1.30	New	0	New
Movement of Independent Candidates	16,868	0.52	New	0	New
Attack	15,659	0.48	New	0	–6
Alternative for Bulgarian Revival	14,798	0.46	–1.1	0	0
Revival of the Fatherland	13,182	0.41	New	0	New
Conservative Union of the Right	9,415	0.29	New	0	New
People's Voice	8,308	0.26	New	0	New
Green Party	5,554	0.17	New	0	New
We, the Citizens	4,788	0.15	New	0	New
Bulgarian Progressive Line	3,751	0.12	New	0	New
Morality, Initiative, Patriotism	3,653	0.11	New	0	New
Together for Change	3,485	0.11	New	0	New
Society for New Bulgaria	3,438	0.11	New	0	New
Direct Democracy	3,408	0.10	New	0	New
Bulgarian Union for Direct Democracy	3,342	0.10	New	0	New
Bulgarian National Union – New Democracy	2,901	0.09	New	0	New
Citizens of Protest	2,356	0.07	New	0	New
The Right	2,165	0.07	New	0	New
Prosperity-Unification-Building	1,586	0.05	New	0	New
Nation	897	0.03	New	0	New
Independents	428	0.01	–0.1	0	0
None of the above	47,749	1.47	–1.0	–	–
Total	3,247,470	100.00	–	240	0
Valid votes	3,247,470	97.40			
Invalid/blank votes	86,527	2.60			
Total votes	3,333,997	100.00			
Registered voters/turnout	6,789,605	49.10	–3.5		
Source: CIK

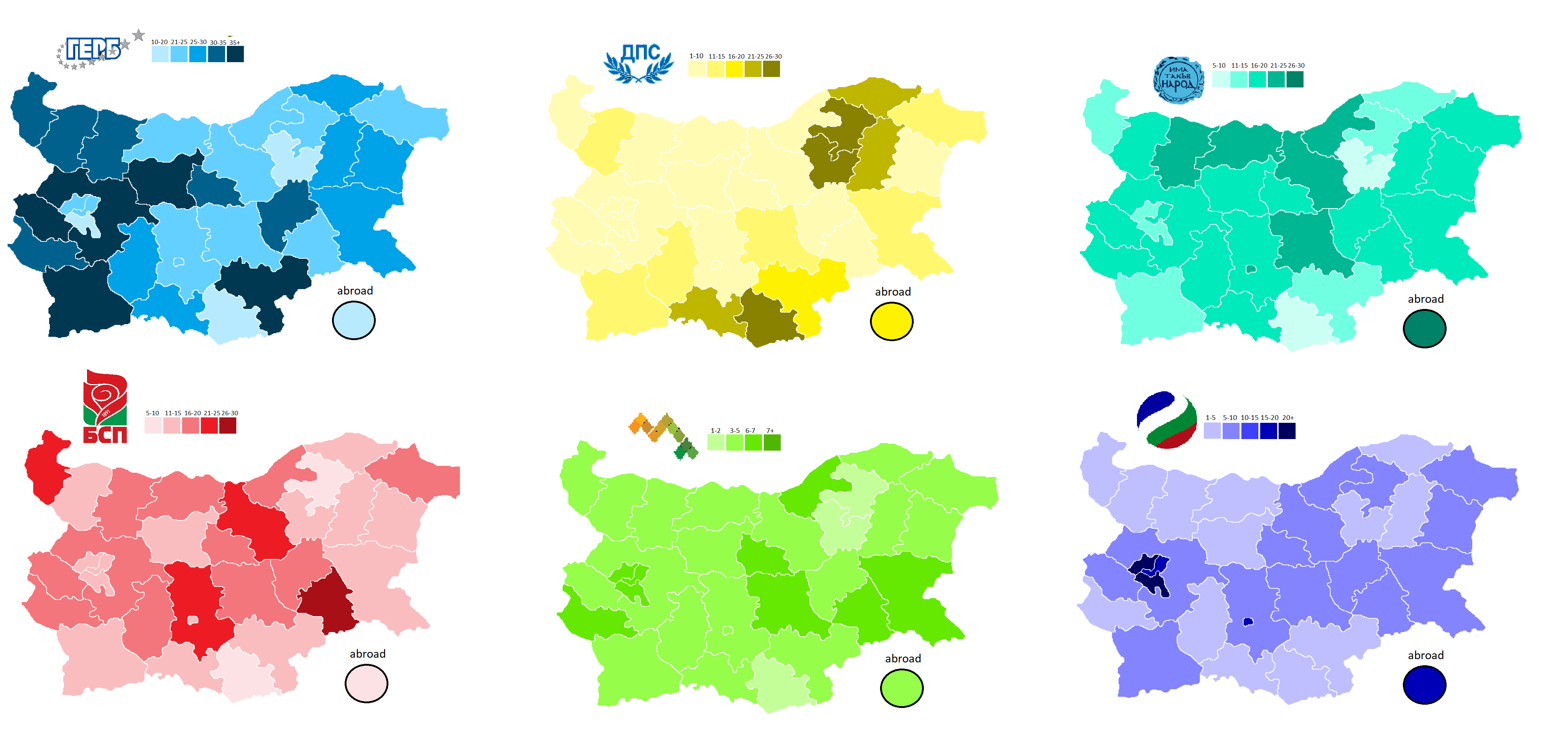
Strength of each party in each constituency in the election

=== By constituency ===
Constituency	GERB–SDS	ITN	BSPzB	DPS	DB	ISMV	VMRO	Others
Blagoevgrad	34.94%	14.99%	12.58%	13.55%	5.10%	3.00%	6.59%	9.25%
Burgas	25.68%	15.33%	14.29%	12.85%	7.18%	5.89%	4.35%	14.43%
Varna	28.84%	19.24%	11.27%	5.65%	8.75%	5.24%	5.98%	15.03%
Veliko Tarnovo	24.00%	20.87%	21.99%	6.61%	6.03%	4.38%	4.11%	12.01%
Vidin	33.13%	14.93%	20.52%	8.78%	4.79%	3.17%	2.85%	11.83%
Vratsa	32.99%	17.63%	16.26%	10.34%	4.28%	3.93%	3.72%	10.85%
Gabrovo	32.20%	19.82%	15.71%	3.68%	5.40%	5.84%	3.41%	13.94%
Dobrich	27.49%	16.86%	19.33%	8.43%	5.52%	4.56%	3.36%	14.45%
Kardzhali	15.30%	5.34%	8.13%	63.05%	2.11%	1.10%	0.49%	4.48%
Kyustendil	31.95%	17.59%	19.59%	1.87%	4.66%	6.16%	4.51%	13.67%
Lovech	35.11%	16.80%	16.09%	10.17%	4.23%	4.29%	2.79%	10.52%
Montana	34.12%	13.56%	14.64%	13.36%	3.04%	3.89%	2.81%	14.58%
Pazardzhik	30.14%	15.91%	16.48%	14.43%	4.12%	3.38%	3.10%	12.44%
Pernik	36.74%	17.48%	16.98%	1.15%	6.00%	5.14%	3.15%	13.36%
Pleven	24.63%	24.23%	18.75%	5.13%	4.60%	4.28%	5.69%	12.69%
Plovdiv-city	25.49%	19.94%	14.63%	2.95%	12.65%	5.08%	4.41%	14.85%
Plovdiv-province	24.87%	18.64%	20.48%	8.50%	4.74%	4.51%	3.26%	15.00%
Razgrad	22.35%	9.01%	9.61%	40.08%	7.51%	1.98%	1.21%	8.25%
Ruse	20.86%	20.98%	18.86%	9.06%	7.99%	5.02%	5.63%	11.60%
Silistra	29.31%	12.01%	13.39%	27.12%	3.49%	2.87%	3.84%	7.97%
Sliven	30.80%	17.22%	17.76%	8.20%	5.51%	5.32%	2.67%	12.52%
Smolyan	29.41%	16.06%	13.53%	20.89%	4.06%	3.72%	1.53%	10.80%
Sofia-city 23	20.17%	14.40%	13.32%	0.57%	28.48%	6.54%	3.32%	13.20%
Sofia-city 24	22.62%	15.41%	13.07%	1.33%	24.43%	5.96%	3.53%	13.65%
Sofia-city 25	24.08%	18.81%	14.70%	0.72%	16.12%	6.28%	4.09%	15.20%
Sofia-province	35.19%	19.02%	16.64%	4.14%	5.24%	3.85%	4.61%	11.31%
Stara Zagora	22.34%	20.70%	16.57%	12.20%	6.23%	6.07%	2.98%	12.91%
Targovishte	18.40%	11.74%	13.41%	37.52%	2.67%	2.63%	1.67%	11.96%
Haskovo	37.34%	14.20%	14.87%	13.40%	4.72%	4.32%	1.42%	9.73%
Shumen	27.69%	14.50%	14.50%	22.65%	3.43%	3.42%	2.80%	11.01%
Yambol	24.38%	18.72%	27.27%	1.54%	5.08%	6.00%	2.34%	14.67%
Bulgarian nationals abroad	8.66%	30.75%	6.52%	13.17%	17.56%	4.24%	1.57%	17.53%
Source: CIK

=== Voter demographics ===
Gallup exit polling suggested the following demographic breakdown. The parties which received below 4% of the vote are included in 'Others':

Voter demographics
Social group	% GERB	% ITN	% BSP	% DPS	% DB	% ISMV	% VMRO	% Others	% Lead
Exit Poll Result	23	17	16	10	10	5	4	15	6
Final Result	25.8	17.4	14.8	10.4	9.3	4.7	3.6	14	8.4
Gender
Men	22	17	16	12	9	3	5	15	5
Women	23	17	17	8	11	6	3	14	6
Age
18–30	15	30	7	11	14	2	3	18	15
30-60	24	18	13	10	11	6	4	14	6
60+	23	8	33	11	6	4	4	11	10
Highest Level of Education
Lower Education	20	6	22	35	2	1	3	11	13
Secondary Education	24	17	19	12	4	4	4	16	5
Higher Education	21	19	14	2	19	7	4	14	2
Ethnic Group
Bulgarian	23	18	18	2	11	5	5	18	5
Turkic	13	3	7	67	1	1	1	7	54
Roma	24	10	18	27	2	2	4	13	3
Location
Towns and Villages	24	10	18	26	2	3	5	12	2
Smaller Cities	24	19	20	9	3	4	5	16	4
Larger Cities	23	20	16	2	10	6	4	18	3
Sofia	19	15	12	0	30	6	3	15	11

== Analysis ==
Both GERB and BSP had very poor results and there was a large turnover with a third of the seats taken by parties not represented in the previous parliament. A central theme in the election was purported corruption in the GERB-led government, which saw GERB lose seats and various anti-corruption parties gain, most notably Slavi Trifonov's ITN, but also DB and ISMV. The Bulgarian Socialist Party suffered from division between its leader Korneliya Ninova and other factions. The BSP recorded their worst-ever result in a democratic election. The far-right parties also suffered from splits, losing their representation in parliament; the Attack party and the two remaining parties from the United Patriots alliance (the National Front for the Salvation of Bulgaria and Volya Movement) contested the elections separately, with none winning a seat. The three combined results of the three parties suggested they could have crossed the electoral threshold if they had run together.

The election happened during the COVID-19 pandemic, which necessitated a greater focus on online campaigning. Contrary to expectations, voter turnout was broadly unchanged.

== Government formation ==
After his offer of a technocrat government was rejected by the opposition, Borisov said that as leader of the largest party, he would try to form a coalition government, and that he would also be open to supporting an ITN-led government. However, Borisov himself stated he would likely be unsuccessful in forming a coalition, with the likeliest outcomes being either a caretaker government followed by new elections or a coalition of parties new to Parliament.

After former foreign minister Daniel Mitov, whom Boyko Borisov had nominated as GERB's candidate for prime minister, failed to form a government, the mandate was then offered to Slavi Trifonov's ITN. Chess grandmaster Antoaneta Stefanova, whom Trifonov appointed to take the mandate from president Rumen Radev immediately returned it in accordance with Trifonov's wish. Korneliya Ninova of BSPzB formally received the final mandate from president Radev on 5 May 2021, but refused to form a government due to a lack of support from other parliamentary opposition parties. This triggered an early election (to be held on 11 July), and the president appointed a caretaker government led by Stefan Yanev to run the country until the elections are over and a permanent administration is formed.
