= 2015 Bulgarian local elections =

← 2011	25 October and 5 November 2015	2019 →
Party	GERB	RB	DPS
Provincial Mayoralities	21	4	1
Provincial Mayoralities +/–	▲7	▲1	Steady
Party	Others
Provincial Mayoralities	1
Provincial Mayoralities +/–	▼8

Local elections were held in all municipalities in Bulgaria on 25 October 2015 (first round) and on 1 November 2015 (second round). Voters elected municipal mayors, village mayors and members of municipal councils of 265 municipalities. They were held alongside a referendum on the electoral code.

== Controversy ==
The election campaign was accompanied by multiple scandals about vote-buying, voting tourists and arrests. On the election day, the election authorities in some polling stations did not provide ballots. After the first round, members of election officials were kept 48 hours locked in the election authority counting center at Arena Aremeec Hall.

== Results ==
=== First round ===
GERB, the opposition party won 34.5% of the vote and their incumbent mayors were reelected in Sofia, Burgas, Varna, Veliko Tarnov, Stara Zagora, Blagoevgrad and Haskovo. Second and third were the government parties the Bulgarian Socialist Party with 17.2% and the Right and Freedom Movement (the Turkish ethnic party) with 14.6%. The smaller parties from the opposition, the Reformist Block, ABV and the Patriot Front, got respectively 9%, 4.3% and 5.2%.

The turnout of the first round was 53.6% which was 5% higher than 2011 local elections.

GERB won 21 regional mayorships, the Reformist Bloc 3, 1 was won by a candidate backed by both. DPS also won 1 and an independent candidate won one.
