= Middle European Class =

Bulgarian political party

Middle European Class Средна Европейска Класа
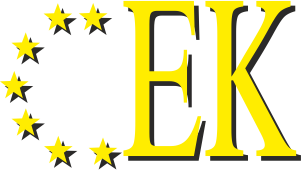
- Abbreviation: SEC
- Leader: Konstantin Bachiyski
- President: Ivan Ivanov
- Founder: Georgi Manev
- Founded: 11 July 2007
- Headquarters: Bulair 8, Burgas
- Ideology: Economic liberalism Burgas regionalism Pro-Europeanism
- Political position: Centre-right
- National affiliation: United Patriots (2017–2020); National Union of the Right (July 2021); We Continue the Change (2021-2024)
- Colours: Blue; Yellow
- National Assembly: 0 / 240

Website
- cek.bg

The Middle European Class (Bulgarian: Средна европейска класа, romanized: Sredna evropejska klasa; SEC/SEK), sometimes translated as Average European Class, is a political party in Bulgaria established by nightclub owner Georgi Manev. It is currently led by Konstantin Bachiiski.

== Electoral participation ==
=== Parliamentary elections ===
==== 2017 ====
In the 2017 parliamentary election, the party was part of the ultranationalists electoral alliance United Patriots with IMRO – Bulgarian National Movement, National Front for the Salvation of Bulgaria and Attack. SEC failed to secure any seats, but United Patriots entered a coalition with GERB to form the Third Borisov Government. In July 2020 SEC withdrew from United Patriots.

==== April 2021 ====
SEC entered a new coalition with far-right political party IMRO but on 17 February 2021 the Central Election Commission did not approve "Middle European Class" for participation in the April 2021 parliamentary election. The reason given was "unsealed documents, lack of signature of the party representative and other documentary failures."

==== July 2021 ====
On 6 June 2021 SEC was again not approved for participation in the July 2021 parliamentary election but party members became part of Petar Moskov's "National Union of the Right" electoral coalition.

==== November 2021 ====
On 17 September 2021 Georgi Manev stepped down as leader of the party and retired from politics. Konstantin Bachiiski became party leader and on 19 September 2021 the party and Volt Bulgaria announced the electoral coalition We Continue the Change led by Kiril Petkov and Assen Vassilev, former caretaker ministers. In the November 2021 Bulgarian parliamentary election We Continue the Change came in first place with 67 seats. It formed a broad coalition with BSP, ITN and DB and was given the mandate to form a government on 13 December 2021. SEK had 4 seats in the National Assembly. After ITN withdrew from the government in June 2022, a snap election was called.

April 2024

On 23 April 2024 the party leader, Konstantin Bachiiski announced to the public that SEK would be leaving the We Continue the Change coalition, a little after the Greens did the same.
