= "VOLT" (Political party in Bulgaria) =

Bulgarian political party

"VOLT" Политическа партия ,,ВОЛТ"
- Abbreviation: Volt / Волт
- Chairperson: Nastimir Ananiev
- Vice Chairperson: Boris Borisov
- Founded: 19 May 2018; 8 years ago
- Headquarters: Sofia
- Ideology: Pro-Europeanism; Social liberalism; Progressivism; Technoliberalism
- Political position: Centre to centre-left
- National affiliation: Stand Up.BG! We are coming! (2021); We Continue the Change (2021–2024); Siyanie (2026)
- National Assembly: 0 / 240
- European Parliament: 0 / 17
- Municipalities: 3 / 265

Website
- volt.bg

National sections of Volt Europa. The borders of the European Union are shown in red.

Political party "VOLT" (Bulgarian: ПП, ВОЛТ") is a social-liberal political party in Bulgaria. Formerly it was the Bulgarian branch of Volt Europa, a progressive and federalist European political alliance. The party has formerly participated in elections, mainly aligning its branding with coalitions rather than acting independently.

== Foundation ==
Volt Bulgaria was founded in Sofia on 19 May 2018, with Nastimir Ananiev as its first chairman.

== History ==
=== 2019 European Parliament election ===
The 2019 European Parliament election in Bulgaria was the first election in which Volt took part. The party obtained 0.18% of the Vote in Bulgaria. Although the Bulgarian branch of Volt was unable to obtain a seat in the European Parliament, it was represented by the German branch, which won one seat.

=== 2019 Bulgarian local election ===
Volt Bulgaria participated in the 2019 Bulgarian local elections with the ''Together for Change'' Coalition list and obtained a seat in several cities thanks to 7.12% of the votes in Haskovo, 6.12% in Rodopi, and 6.39% in Sopot.

=== April 2021 Bulgarian parliamentary election ===
Volt Bulgaria participated in the April 2021 Bulgarian parliamentary election as part of the anti-government Stand Up! Mafia, Get Out! (ISMV) coalition. The coalition gained 14 seats in the National Assembly, none of which were allocated to members of Volt.

=== July 2021 Bulgarian parliamentary election ===
Volt Bulgaria again participated in the July 2021 Bulgarian parliamentary election as part of ISMV. The coalition gained 13 seats in the 240-seat parliament, none of which were allocated to members of Volt.

=== November 2021 Bulgarian parliamentary election ===
Volt Bulgaria participated in the November 2021 Bulgarian parliamentary election as part of the electoral coalition We Continue the Change (PP) led by Kiril Petkov and Assen Vassilev, respectively the former caretaker economy and finance ministers. The coalition gained 67 seats, two of which was allocated to members of Volt. This made Volt Bulgaria the second Volt Europa party to enter a national legislature after Volt Netherlands.

== Election results ==
=== National Assembly ===
Election	Leader	Votes	%	Seats	+/–	Government
Apr 2021 (Note: Ran as part of the Stand Up! Mafia, Get Out! coalition)	Nastimir Ananiev	150,940	4.65 (6th)	0 / 240	New	Snap election
Jul 2021	Nastimir Ananiev	136,885	4.95 (6th)	0 / 240	0	Snap election
Nov 2021 (Note: Ran as part of the We Continue the Change coalition)	Nastimir Ananiev	666,837	25.65 (1st)	2 / 240	▲2	Coalition
2022	Nastimir Ananiev	506,099	19.52 (2nd)	2 / 240	0	Snap election
2023 (Note: Ran as part of the PP–DB coalition)	Nastimir Ananiev	621,069	23.54 (2nd)	1 / 240	▼1	Coalition
Jun 2024	Nastimir Ananiev	307,849	13.92 (3rd)	0 / 240	▼1	Snap election
Oct 2024	Nastimir Ananiev	Did not contest				
2026 (Note: Ran as part of the Siyanie coalition)	Nastimir Ananiev	93,559	2.84 (9th)	0 / 240	0	Extra-parliamentary

=== European Parliament ===
Election	List leader	Votes	%	Seats	+/–	EP Group
2019	Nastimir Ananiev	3,500	0.18 (18th)	0 / 17	New	–
2024 (Note: Ran as part of the PP-DB coalition)	Nikola Minchev	290,865	14.45 (3rd)	0 / 17	0	–
