= United People's Party (Bulgaria) =

United People's Party Единна народна партия
- Abbreviation: ENP
- Leader: Valentina Vasileva-Filadelfevs
- Founder: Mariya Kapon
- Founded: December 10, 2007
- Dissolved: March 25, 2023
- Split from: Democratic Party
- Merged into: We Are Coming
- Headquarters: Ivan Denkoglu St. 19, Sofia
- Ideology: Liberalism; Economic liberalism Pro-Europeanism
- Political position: Centre-right
- National affiliation: Forwards (2009); The Rights (2014); Rise (2019); Stand Up.BG! We are coming! (2021-2023); PP–DB (2023)
- Colours: Blue
- National Assembly: 0 / 240

Website
- enp.bg

The United People's Party (Bulgarian: Единна народна партия, romanized: Edinna narodna partiya; ENP) is a political party in Bulgaria. The chairwoman of the party is Valentina Vasileva-Filadelfevs.

== History ==
The party ran in the April 2021 election as part of the Stand Up! Mafia, Get Out! coalition, and won three seats.
