= 2019 Bulgarian local elections =

Elections to municipal councils and mayoralties

- 27 October and 3 November 2019

All positions for mayors and councillors on both the local and provincial level
- Turnout: 42%
	First party	Second party	Third party
Party	GERB–SDS	BSP	SDS
Provincial Mayoralities	17	4	2 (Note: Since 2019 SDS and GERB have been coalition partners on the national level. Elected oblast mayors from SDS are thus only listed as "SDS" when they weren't endorsed by GERB and are otherwise included in GERB-SDS.)
Provincial Mayoralities +/–	▼4 (Note: Compared to just GERB in 2015.)	▲4	▼2 (Note: Compared to the Reformist Bloc.)
	Fourth party	Fifth party	Sixth party
Party	DPS	DBG	Others
Provincial Mayoralities	1	1	2
Provincial Mayoralities +/–	Steady	▲1	▲1
- A map showing the final results for mayoral positions on the Provincial level following the second round of the election

The first round of the local elections for mayors and municipal councilors on both the local and provincial level in Bulgaria were held on 27 October 2019. The second round of the election took place on 3 November, as per the decree signed by the President of Bulgaria. 6,227,901 Bulgarians were included on the voter lists and were eligible to vote, a 136,000 voter reduction compared to the 2015 local elections.

Following the final results, the results on the provincial level showed that the ruling GERB party had lost 6 mayorships in comparison to the previous election. The Socialist Party gained four, the Bulgaria for Citizens movement gained one, the Movement for Rights and Freedoms kept their previous result by obtaining one each, and two independent candidates were elected.

== Electoral system ==
The elections to Bulgaria's municipal councils are conducted via proportional representation with an open list preferential voting system.

The mayoral elections take place within the context of a majoritarian two-round system. The first round of the elections was held on 27 October. If no candidate in a given constituency managed to gain 50% of the vote, a runoff election was held for that constituency in the second round on 3 November.

Voting is officially mandatory, but in practice there is no punishment for failing to vote and the law itself isn't strictly enforced.

Voters further have the option to vote against all proposed candidates.

A recent change in Bulgaria's electoral code made it mandatory for all candidates in the local elections to have had a permanent address registration within their respective constituency for at least 6 months prior to the election in order to be permitted to stand for election in that constituency.

Machine voting did not take place, as this type of voting was removed from Bulgaria's electoral code in July, under the pretext that it would be "too complicated" for voters to vote in local elections using machines.

Bulgarian law imposes strong restrictions on campaign agitation. Each piece of electoral propaganda must clearly show the candidate which it represents and must contain the phrase "the buying and selling of votes is a crime". The use of Bulgaria's flag or coat of arms on election materials is strictly forbidden. Religious symbols, as well as symbols representing foreign countries or regions are also banned. All campaign materials must be issued in the Bulgarian language only. No agitation is permitted on 26 October, the day before the election. Candidates may also only present their platforms before the media after concluding a written contract. Agitation within public transport, as well as all state or local institutions, as well as corporations with over 50% state ownership are banned.

Voting takes place between 7:00 and 20:00, which can be extended to 21:00, if by 20:00 there are still people waiting in line to vote. After the votes are collected, they are transported by the Bulgarian police to Arena Armeets, where they are subsequently verified and counted.

== Electoral campaign ==
The electoral season officially began on 27 September. A total of 59 political parties, 7 coalitions and numerous independents announced their intention to field a total of 12,000 mayoral candidates and 36,000 candidates for members of the municipal councils.

All of Bulgaria's political parties spent a total sum of 1,3 million Bulgarian lev in the electoral campaign in the run-up to the elections. VMRO spent the largest amount of money on the campaign, totaling nearly 300,000 lev. The Movement for Rights and Freedoms came second in terms of spending with over 145,000 lev spent, while the Bulgarian Socialist Party came in third with around 140,000 lev.

The Mayors of Montana and Gotse Delchev set the record for longest mayoral terms, with both of them standing for election for the seventh consecutive term.

=== Funding changes ===
A few months before the election, Bulgaria's National Assembly accepted a government bill, which cut public party subsidies from 11 down to just 1 lev per vote. The bill also permitted unlimited donations to political parties by private individuals or corporations for the first time in Bulgaria's history. The change was criticised by Bulgaria's opposition as a "hit by a bat" from the government in time for the local elections.

== Mayorship of Sofia ==
The election for the position of Mayor of Sofia, Bulgaria's capital and largest city, was expected to be hotly contested in particular. Twenty people announced their intention to run for that position, including incumbent mayor Yordanka Fandakova from the ruling GERB party, former Ombudsman and parliamentary deputy head Maya Manolova, VMRO deputy chairman Angel Dzhambazki, and Volen Siderov, the leader of the ATAKA party, who resigned from his seat in the National Assembly in order to announce his candidacy.

Fandakova based her campaign around continuing the work she had begun during her previous tenures. Manolova's campaign revolved around fixing the aftermath of various scandals surrounding municipal renovations that had happened during Fandakova's previous term, digitalization of municipal services and ensuring kindergarten access for all young children in the city. Dzhambazki focused his campaign on dismantling ghettos inhabited primarily by Bulgaria's romani minority, as well as banning the annual Sofia Pride gay parade as part of what he described as a 'law and order' campaign.

The election was expected to be a very tight race between Fandakova, who had run the city for three consecutive mandates and Manolova, who is one of the only two Bulgarian politicians with an approval rating of above 50%. Dzhambazki was expected to come in third.

The election was also noteworthy for the fact that it breaks the typical electoral mould. Sofia is traditionally known as a stronghold of centre-right and right-wing politics and is usually considered a very safe election for the ruling GERB party, yet Maya Manolova, who hails from the leftist Socialist Party, was predicted to be one of the top two candidates. If elected, she would have become the first left-wing Mayor of Sofia since the end of the socialist period.

A pre-election study found it necessary for a candidate to receive around 6000-7000 votes in order to be elected into Sofia's municipal assembly.

== Conduct ==
=== First round ===
The first round of the election took place on October 27. The electoral commission ordered the seizure of all preference vote ballots in the town of Pleven due to what it deemed a "technical error".

The ruling GERB party's campaign announced that it would ask Bulgaria's electoral authorities to punish television broadcaster BTV for airing footage which GERB deemed to have negatively affected their electoral result during the voting day. BTV stated that they would refuse to comment before they receive a copy of the complaint.

VMRO complained of what they deemed to be "vote buying, voter intimidation and harassment". VMRO's candidate in Plovdiv decried what he deemed to be "monsterous" electoral manipulation and stated that he would refer the matter to Bulgarian public prosecution.

Maya Manolova's campaign raised concerns over what they deemed to be "organized vote buying" in favour of Fandakova in three of Sofia's districts, pointing to large discrepancies between the candidates in several electoral sections, in which Fandakova has 10 times more votes than all other candidates combined, despite polling at around 30% in opinion polls and not being native to those districts. Manolova later alleged that the "entire Bulgarian underground was mobilized" to engage in widespread electoral fraud in favour of her opponent Yordanka Fandakova from the ruling GERB party. Fandakova denied the allegations and stated that it would be impossible for her to win the Sofia election via vote buying.

Three cases of major fraud were investigated in the town of Byala Slatina, in which undefined figures broke the secrecy of the ballot by observing which candidates voters were casting their ballot for. In addition, hundreds of voters voted in special mobile voting booths using allegedly fake medical documents. Some of these voters admitted that they were illiterate, that they had no real medical documents and that the voting booth officials "helped them secretly" to make a decision on whom to vote for. An illegally unsealed ballot box was also allegedly found to have been used during the voting process in the town.

Due to long waiting times during the counting of the ballots, the central electoral commission provided government-funded Sorry! board games, playing cards, plasma TVs which play Bulgarian movies and various other tabletop games in an attempt to please the counters of the electoral vote. The commission also separated the entry points to the counting arena, in order to attempt to avoid a repeat of the 2015 elections, in which the counting authorities were locked in without food for over 3 days and wrote SOS messages on Arena Armeec's windows in what was described as analogous to a "hostage crisis". Despite these measures, two civilian counters and one policeman fell unconscious during the counting process.

Numerous errors were discovered during the ballot verification process. Bulgaria's electoral authorities refused to specify the amount of the errors.

ATAKA's Volen Siderov arrived at the ballot counting premises and insisted to be allowed in. He was denied entry by the policemen guarding the area and left by midnight after a long argument with the authorities, which stated that Bulgarian electoral law makes no provision for election candidates to observe the counting process.

The independent mayor of Nesebar, who was running for a new term, was arrested the day before the election and held in detention throughout the first round election. Several socialist party councillors were also arrested alongside him by police. Despite this, he managed to win the election while still under arrest by defeating GERB's candidate for the position. A local court later ordered that he continue to be held in detention, which rendered the newly re-elected mayor unable to attend the oath-taking ceremony at the local council, thus raising legal questions as to whether or not he would be eligible to take up the position for another mandate. The arrestees were accused by prosecutors of taking part in a vote buying ring, an allegation dubbed "hilarious" by the mayor's attorney, which stated that the prosecution had only summoned a single witness, which allegedly rambled on stories with an "unexpected" ending. The arrests came after a request by State Prosecutor Sotir Tsatsarov to the Central Electoral Commission for the removal of the legal immunity of the mayor, the socialist party councillors, as well as several candidates from the "21 Movement", was granted by the commission. The chairman of Nesebar's Municipal Assembly, himself hailing from the socialist party, stated that he believed the only explanation for these arrests were a "political order" as part of a "war" to seize power in the town.

Despite these events, Bulgaria's electoral authorities stated that the first round of the vote had taken place successfully "without major incidents".

==== Aftermath ====
Following civil protests in favour of Nesebar's re-elected Mayor, who was held in detention, Bulgarian authorities eventually agreed to allow him to give his oath of office. He was escorted in a police van to the local municipal assembly by a dozen officers and became the first elected Bulgarian official to give his oath of office while wearing handcuffs. He pledged to serve the town and denied all accusations levied against him. Following his oath, he was taken back to jail by the police. His inauguration was ceremonial, as he would not be permitted to run the town from his jail cell. In addition, Bulgarian prosecutors stated that they were considering the option of calling for the annulment of the Nesebar election and the termination of his term.

=== Second round ===
Bulgaria's Central Electoral Commission stated that numerous reports were made about illegal vote buying and improper electoral agitation during the election day.

Maya Manolova's electoral campaign in Sofia stated that it allegedly had evidence of organized electoral fraud organized by the ruling GERB party. It stated that it had dozens of reports of vote buying, exit poll rigging and violations of Bulgaria's electoral law, adding that the electoral commission had refused access to any of her campaign's authorized representatives to the vote counting premises at Arena Armeec, despite them having the legal right to do so. For these reasons, her campaign declared that it did not recognize the election results and would attempt to have the Sofia election annulled and re-run. The Bulgarian Socialist Party stated that it did not have the legal right to ask for a re-run of the election, as Manolova had formally run as an independent, instead of a Socialist Party candidate. Despite this, the party declared that it would support her bid for a re-run, promising to "remain on the same team" as her and adding that it would "remain eternally loyal to Miss Manolova". Tomislav Donchev from the ruling GERB party denied that his party had been involved in electoral manipulation, stating that GERB's "various opponents had always complained of electoral fraud", adding that he was not concerned with them.

On the nationwide scale, the Socialist Party's leader Korneliya Ninova stated that the elections were skewed by "vote buying" and an "atmosphere of fear" among voters. She lamented both the conduct of the elections and the recent changes to Bulgaria's electoral code and raised concerns over the election over the mayorship of the Shumen Province, where the candidate supported by GERB defeated the Socialist Party's nominee by just 77 votes, while the electoral authorities declared over 400 ballots as 'invalid'. She also stated that the socialist party's candidate in the Lovech Province had also lost the election to GERB's nominee by just 347 votes and alleged that in that case the number of invalidated ballots was also "huge". She finished by stating that her party was considering filing a petition before the Bulgarian courts for the annulment and rerunning of the elections in these provinces.

A newly elected mayor hailing from the Alternative for Bulgarian Revival stated that a fellow local councillor and party member in the city of Strelcha was ambushed and badly beaten during the dark hours of the day due to his local political activities in favour of the party. He further alleged that the party had been targeted with "pressure" during the elections, which he described as a "swamp".

Large irregularities during the verification of ballots in several villages in Varna Province led to a case being filed with the Bulgarian Administrative Court, as a third of all ballots cast were declared to be "blank".

Several political analysts asserted that the elections in several provinces and localities were allegedly won by illegal vote buying. A sociologist further called the elections "the most corrupt elections in the country" and alleged that one of the political parties had even announced a campaign, where it would pay 50 lev to any citizen, which signs up as a party member.

The former mayor of Garmen was arrested by police for alleged illegal vote buying. A candidate for the Blagoevgrad municipal council was also interrogated by Bulgarian police over vote buying allegations.

Bulgarian President Rumen Radev stated that he believed the electoral process had been "compromised" and called on all citizens to vote in order to dilute the effect of the alleged mass vote buying campaigns. He further stated, that he would invite the Bulgarian Police, Central Electoral Commission and Parliamentary parties to a discussion on what should be the response to what he deemed to be the "retreat of fairness from the electoral process".

==== Aftermath ====
A week following the second round of the election, Maya Manolova officially filed a petition for the annulment of Sofia's Mayoral election, stating that she had deposited 14 folders full of evidence of alleged fraud and errors in both the voting and counting process. She further alleged that nearly 6700 residents of EU-member states, which are enfranchised in local elections, had been denied their right to vote as the local administration only included 44 such residents on the electoral rolls. The Socialist Party further filed petitions for the annulment of the elections in three of Sofia's districts - Iskar, Lyulin and Krasna polyana, in which the socialist candidates were all very narrowly defeated by GERB candidates, with the socialists alleging that they had evidence these electoral victories were due to illegal vote buying.

The GERB candidates denied the allegations, while Bulgarian Prime minister and GERB leader Boyko Borisov reacted sharply by declaring that GERB's victory in Sofia had been "undebatable" and adding that in the same vein that Manolova wanted to annul the mayoral election, he himself would like to annul the 2016 Bulgarian presidential election which GERB lost, but that it would be pointless as the president's mandate was already coming to an end.

== Results ==
=== First round ===
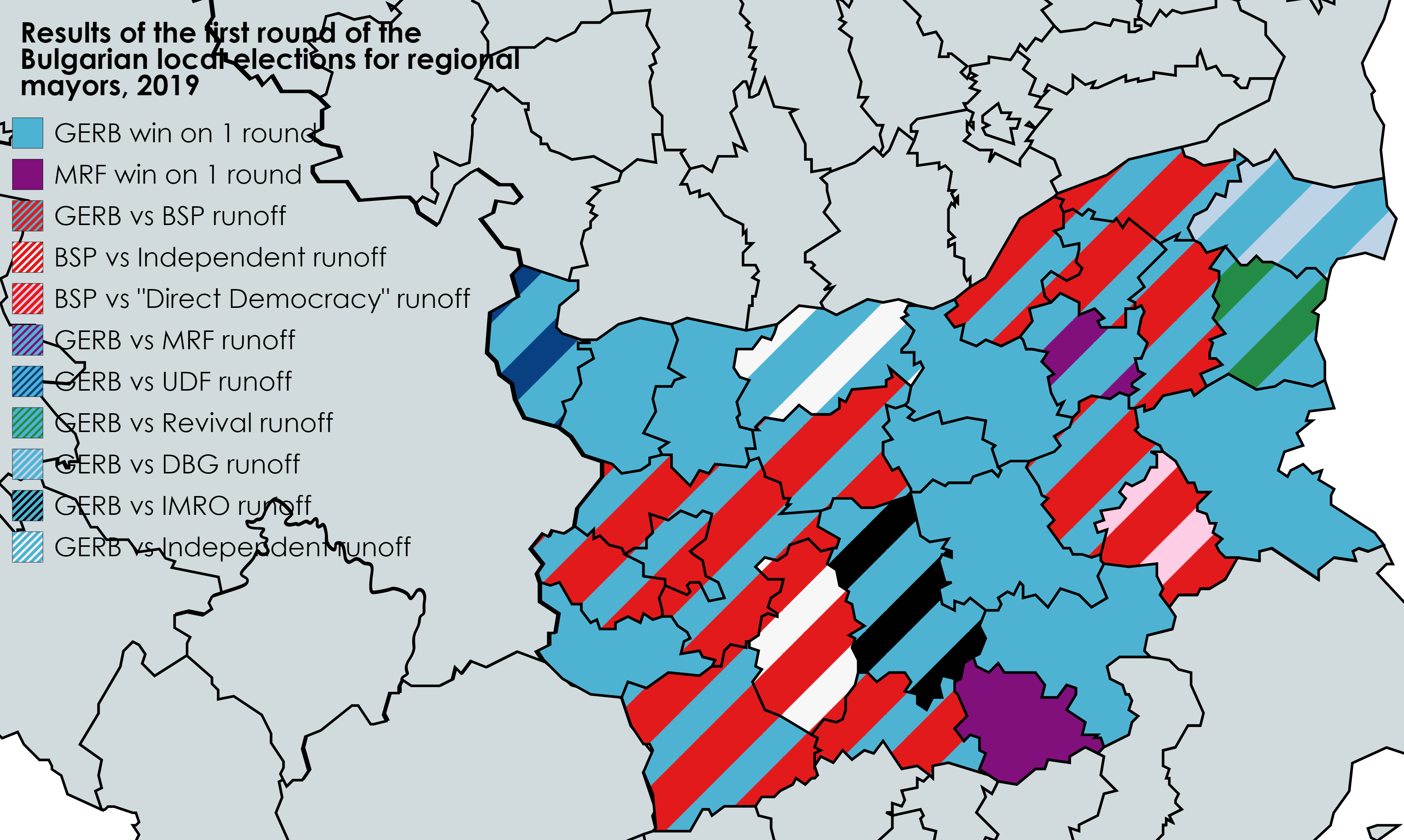
A map graphically depicting the results of the First round of the mayoral election on the provincial level of the election. Source: Central Electoral Commission official results

Following the first round on 27 October, the ruling GERB party remained Bulgaria's strongest political party. It won 90 localities in the first round, compared to 65 in the 2015 elections. Despite this increase, GERB's overall support had actually decreased, in what some political scientists described as an "erosion", a "serious challenge" for the party, and a "heavy hit". On the provincial level, the party obtained a plurality of Bulgaria's provinces, winning the mayoral elections on the first round in 8 regions, and qualifying for a runoff in all but three other regions.

The Bulgarian Socialist Party won 35 localities in the first round and qualified for the runoff election in 50 more. The party is going to compete against GERB in a runoff election in 9 major cities, compared to the zero it had during the previous election. The party enjoyed a considerable overall increase in support, but still lagged behind GERB by a non-negligible margin. On the provincial level, while the party didn't win any mayoral positions in the first round, it qualified to the runoff election in 13 of Bulgaria's regions.

The Movement for Rights and Freedoms won the Kardzhali mayoral election on the provincial level in the first round and qualified for the runoff in the Targovishte Province.

VMRO, the Union of Democratic Forces, the Bulgaria for Citizens Movement, the "Direct Democracy" movement and two Independent candidates didn't win any mayoral positions on the provincial level in the first round of the election, but qualified for one runoff election each.

The nationwide electoral turnout was around 42%.

==== Sofia ====
Popular vote (Sofia City Council)
GERB-UDF	32.68%
Bulgarian Socialist Party	18.05%
Democratic Bulgaria (Note: A coalition between Yes, Bulgaria!, The Greens and Democrats for a Strong Bulgaria)	14.52%
Boris Bonev (Note: Stood as an independent candidate, but backed by the "Save Sofia" movement. He was simultaneously a candidate for both Mayor of Sofia and municipal councillor.)	8.55%
VMRO	4.82%
ATAKA	1.61%
MRF	1.27%
People's Voice	1.16%
Revival	1.08%
GREENS	1.04%
ABV	0.95%
Others	8.74%

Popular vote (Mayor of Sofia) - First Round
Yordanka Fandakova	36.37%
Maya Manolova (Note: Officially stood as an independent candidate, as she never renewed her party membership, which she was forced to renounce by law during her previous tenure as Ombudsman. However, she was officially endorsed by the Bulgarian Socialist Party and was previously a provincial party leader.)	27.79%
Borislav Ignatov	12.20%
Boris Bonev (Note: Stood as an independent candidate, but backed by the "Save Sofia" movement. He was simultaneously a candidate for both Mayor of Sofia and municipal councillor.)	10.77%
Angel Dzhambazki	3.90%
Against all	2.32%
Volen Siderov	1.44%
Others	5.23%

GERB doubled its number of councillors among Sofia's districts. At the same time, GERB's mayoral candidate in Sofia, Yordanka Fandakova, saw only 36% voter support in comparison to 60% in 2015. Furthermore, while GERB had won between 18 and 20 of Sofia's districts in the first round during the previous election, the party failed to muster the same support this time around, thus forcing every single district of Sofia into a second round runoff election.

The Socialist Party's Maya Manolova managed to obtain 27% of the vote, thus securing a runoff election with the incumbent Fandakova from the GERB party and marking a huge increase from the previous election, in which the Socialist Party's Mihail Mirchev polled third with only 8% of the vote. The party also more than doubled its representation in Sofia's municipal assembly, becoming the second largest party in the chamber by surpassing the "urban rightist" coalitions.

The Democratic Bulgaria coalition, a union of centre-right and right-wing parties which represent Sofia's traditional "urban rightists" came in third, with its candidate Borislav Ignatov securing 12% of the vote.

Boris Bonev from the widely pro-European localist "Save Sofia" movement came in fourth with just under 11% of the vote. Despite the fact that he was not elected as Mayor of Sofia, he was nonetheless elected as a municipal councillor, as he had been a candidate for both Mayor and municipal councilor in the same election.

VMRO's Angel Dzhambazki fared far worse than expected, polling in fifth at under 4% voter support, despite the fact that the party had spent the largest amount of money for its election campaign.

The rest of Bulgaria's nationalist parties, including ATAKA and the National Front for the Salvation of Bulgaria, also fared relatively poorly, receiving less support than in the country's European Parliament election that same year, as well as when compared to the previous local elections in 2014. ATAKA's Volen Siderov polled in at just over 1% of the vote.

=== Second round ===
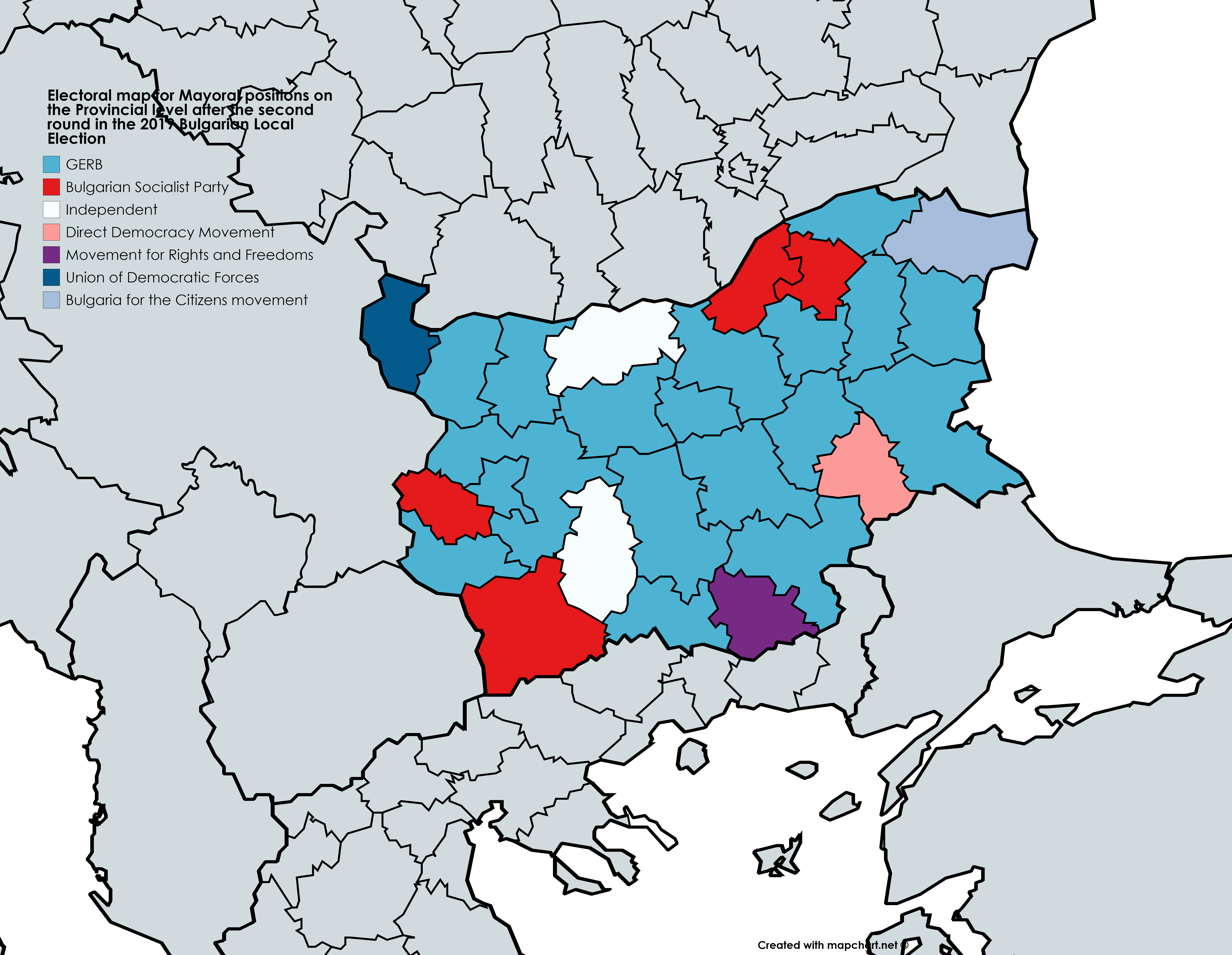
A map depicting the end result for mayoral positions on the provincial level after the second round of the 2019 Bulgarian Local elections. Source: Central Electoral Commission

GERB managed to win the majority of Mayoral positions on the provincial level after the second round, thus securing its position in first place, despite obtaining a noticeably poorer result than in the previous election and losing several regions. GERB's largest success in the election, however, was managing to narrowly secure their control of Sofia City Province and Plovdiv Province, which were strongly contested by the Socialist Party and VMRO respectively.

The Socialist Party marked a major increase in support, managing to secure 4 mayoral positions, including the very hotly contested Pernik Province. On the local level, the socialist party won the runoff in 26 localities, thus bringing the total number of local settlements under the party's control up to 61 - more than double the party's result from the previous local election.

Two independent candidates won mayoral positions by defeating the two main parties' candidates in the second round - one in Pazardzhik Province (Note: Supported by the VMRO, the Alliance of Free Democrats and United Agrarians) and the other in Pleven Province. (Note: Supported by "Democratic Bulgaria" and the UDF)

The UDF managed to avoid being taken off the Bulgarian provincial map by winning the Vidin Province.

The Bulgaria for Citizens Movement defeated GERB's candidate and won the election in the Dobrich Province.

The "Direct Democracy" movement entered the Bulgarian local scene by securing the Yambol Province.

Bulgaria's central electoral commission reported that total voter turnout was at 42,1%.

==== Sofia ====
Popular vote (Mayor of Sofia) - Second Round
Yordanka Fandakova	49.98%
Maya Manolova (Note: Officially stood as an independent candidate, as she never renewed her party membership, which she was forced to renounce by law during her previous tenure as Ombudsman. However, she was officially endorsed by the Bulgarian Socialist Party and was previously a provincial party leader.)	45.13%
Against all	4.89%

Although she failed to achieve a majority, GERB's Yordanka Fandakova won the election by managing to score at just over 4% more support than her primary opponent - Maya Manolova, and was thus re-elected for another term as Mayor of Sofia.

In an unexpected turn of events, a large percentage of the centre-right and right-wing voters, which had previously supported the "Democratic Bulgaria" coalition or the VMRO's Angel Dzhambazki, voted mostly in favour of Manolova, the candidate supported by the leftist Socialist Party, instead of Fandakova from the centre-right GERB party. Despite this, political analysts noted that the newly-added option for voters to cast a ballot for none of the above allowed Fandakova to secure another mandate as Mayor of Sofia.

GERB, however, took a very heavy hit in Sofia's local districts. The GERB-UDF coalition managed to win only 11 of Sofia's 25 local mayoral positions, as opposed to the 2015 elections in which GERB alone won 23.

The candidates of the "Democratic Bulgaria" coalition fared well, winning control over 11 local mayoral positions, the vast majority of which were held by GERB in the previous election.

The Bulgarian Socialist Party entered into the field of Sofia's local politics, as it won control of two of Sofia's districts - Izgrev and Mladost, whereas it lacked any local mayoral seats in Sofia in the previous election.

==== Summary of results ====
Results by province:

Elected mayors by province in 2019
Province	Candidate	Party / Coalition	1st Round	2nd Round
Province	Candidate	Party / Coalition	%	%
Blagoevgrad	Atanas Kambitov	GERB	25.65%	40.98%
Blagoevgrad	Rumen Tomov	Independent candidate (BSP for Bulgaria)	20.50%	56.61%
Burgas	Димитър Николов	ПП ГЕРБ	65,83	-
Varna	Иван Портних	ПП ГЕРБ	49,29	60,79
Varna	Костадин Костадинов	ВЪЗРАЖДАНЕ	14,30	35,99
Veliko Tarnovo	Даниел Панов	ПП ГЕРБ	60,55	-
Vidin	Огнян Ценков	ПП ГЕРБ	32,12	39,49
Vidin	Цветан Ценков	Местна коалиция СДС (НДСВ, Нова алтернатива, ЗНС, БЗНС, БДСР)	30,41	58,27
Vratsa	Калин Каменов	ПП ГЕРБ	72,82	-
Gabrovo	Таня Христова	ПП ГЕРБ	58,63	-
Dobrich	Йордан Йорданов	Местна коалиция ДБГ (ДБГ, НДСВ, ССД, ГН)	41,22	66,54
Dobrich	Надежда Петкова	Местна коалиция ГЕРБ (СДС)	29,46	31,97
Кърджали	Хасан Азис	Движение за права и свободи – ДПС	53,02	-
Кюстендил	Петър Паунов	Местна коалиция ГЕРБ (ПП ГЕРБ, ПП СДС, ПП ВМРО-БНД, ДБГ, ЗНС, ПП ОБЕДИНЕНИ ЗЕМЕДЕЛЦИ)	54,96	-
Ловеч	Корнелия Маринова	ПП ГЕРБ	28,82	48,45
Ловеч	Радина Банкова	БСП ЗА БЪЛГАРИЯ	26,30	46,45
Монтана	Златко Живков	Местна коалиция „СДС (ГЕРБ, БНД, ВМРО-БНД и ЗНС)“	71,75	-
Пазарджик	Тодор Попов	Местна коалиция НОВОТО ВРЕМЕ	44,72	56,11
Пазарджик	Благо Солов	Местна коалиция БСП ЗА БЪЛГАРИЯ (ЗЕМЕДЕЛСКИ НАРОДЕН СЪЮЗ, ПАРТИЯ НА ЗЕЛЕНИТЕ, СОЦИАЛДЕМОКРАТИЧЕСКА ПАРТИЯ, НФСБ, ДВИЖЕНИЕ ЗА РАДИКАЛНА ПРОМЯНА БЪЛГАРСКАТА ПРОЛЕТ)	18,90	41,05
Перник	Вяра Церовска	ПП ГЕРБ	40,98	47,68
Перник	Станислав Владимиров	БСП ЗА БЪЛГАРИЯ	39,61	50,27
Плевен	Мирослав Петров	ПП ГЕРБ	30,29	47,24
Плевен	Георг Спартански	независим кандидат	36,90	50,60
Пловдив	Здравко Димитров	ПП ГЕРБ	36,14	57,32
Пловдив	Славчо Атанасов	Местна коалиция „НФСБ (ВМРО-БНД)“	16,15	38,10
Разград	Валентин Василев	ПП ГЕРБ	24,36	42,48
Разград	Денчо Бояджиев	БСП ЗА БЪЛГАРИЯ	25,38	54,32
Русе	Диана Иванова	ПП ГЕРБ	25,13	36,63
Русе	Пенчо Милков	Местна коалиция БСП за България (АБВ, Движение за радикална промяна Българската пролет, ПД Социалдемократи)	35,16	60,53
Силистра	Юлиян Найденов	ПП ГЕРБ	48,51	52,12
Силистра	Момчил Неков	Местна коалиция БСП за България (БСП за България, НДСВ, ДРП Българската пролет, МИР)	29,02	45,63
Сливен	Стефан Радев	ПП ГЕРБ	48,47	64,75
Сливен	Кольо Милев	БСП ЗА БЪЛГАРИЯ	24,33	32,71
Смолян	Николай Мелемов	ПП ГЕРБ	39,84	56,73
Смолян	Стефан Сабрутев	БСП ЗА БЪЛГАРИЯ	21,46	40,52
София	Йорданка Фандъкова	Местна коалиция ГЕРБ (СДС)	36,37	49,98
София	Мая Манолова-Найденова	независим кандидат (БСП ЗА БЪЛГАРИЯ)	27,79	45,13
Стара Загора	Живко Веселинов Тодоров	ПП ГЕРБ	68,63	-
Търговище	Дарин Димитров	ПП ГЕРБ	48,43	69,41
Търговище	Хамди Илиязов	Движение за права и свободи – ДПС	37,36	29,27
Хасково	Станислав Дечев	ПП ГЕРБ	51,75	-
Шумен	Любомир Христов	ПП ГЕРБ	32,35	48,57
Шумен	Венцислав Венков	БСП ЗА БЪЛГАРИЯ	22,02	48,27
Ямбол	Валентин Ревански	ПРЯКА ДЕМОКРАЦИЯ	40,18	61,92
Ямбол	Катя Георгиева	БСП ЗА БЪЛГАРИЯ	21,54	35,27
