= Maya Manolova =

Bulgarian politician (born 1965)

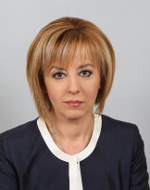

Member of the National Assembly
- In office 15 April 2021 – 15 September 2021
- Constituency: 23rd MMC - Sofia
- In office 11 July 2005 – 8 October 2015
- Constituency: 10th MMC - Kyustendil

Leader of Stand Up.BG
- Incumbent
- Assumed office 6 December 2019
- Preceded by: Position established

3rd National Ombudswoman of Bulgaria
- In office 20 October 2015 – 3 September 2019
- Preceded by: Konstantin Penchev
- Succeeded by: Diana Kovacheva

Deputy Speaker of the National Assembly
- In office 21 May 2013 – 6 August 2014
- Speaker: Mihail Mikov
- Preceded by: Ekaterina Mihaylova
- Succeeded by: Yanaki Stoilov

Personal details
- Born: 4 May 1965 (age 61) Kyustendil, PR Bulgaria
- Party: Stand Up.BG (2019–present)
- Other political affiliations: BSP (1990–2015); Communist Party (1989–1990)
- Spouse(s): Milen Manolov (m. 2000; div. 2007) Angel Naydenov (m. 2016)
- Children: 1
- Education: Moscow University; University of National and World Economy
- Occupation: Lawyer, Politician
- Website: https://mayamanolova.bg/ For her candidacy as Mayor of Sofia

Maya Bozhidarova Manolova (Bulgarian: Мая Божидарова Манолова; born 4 May 1965) is a Bulgarian politician and lawyer, who has served as chairperson of the Commission for Consumer Protection since September 2026. She previously served as a member of the National Assembly, Deputy Speaker of the National Assembly of Bulgaria and National Ombudsman of Bulgaria.

== Biography ==
Manolova was born on 4 May 1965 in Kyustendil. She graduated History in the Moscow University for Humanities and later earned master's degrees in Economics and Law at the Bulgarian University of National and World Economy, as well as completing a specialty program in social management. Manolova was a registered attorney in her home town of Kyustendil from 1998 to 2015 and later from 2019 to 2026.

== Political career ==
=== Member and Deputy Chairperson of the National Assembly ===
She became a member of Bulgaria's National Assembly, representing the Bulgarian Socialist Party in August 2005, taking part in numerous parliamentary commissions.

In 2008, she took control of the Socialist Party's Kyustendil branch.

Following the 2013 Bulgarian parliamentary election, she was elected as Deputy Speaker of Bulgaria's national assembly. She lost that position after her party's exit from government following the 2014 Bulgarian parliamentary election, but was reеlected as a member of the National Assembly for another term. Upon the resignation of Sergey Stanishev as party chair in July 2014, she unsuccessfully participated in the Socialist Party leadership election, placing fifth with the support of 83 delegates. Manolova was one of the ideologists of the machine voting in Bulgaria. During the 42nd National Assembly, she was the chief of the parliamentary commission for creating a new electoral codex which was known as the "Manolova Electoral Codex" and for the first time in Bulgarian history machine voting was introduced, although later delayed by GERB.

=== Ombudsman ===
Manolova was appointed as Ombudsman of Bulgaria by the National Assembly on 20 October 2015. Even though the ruling GERB party, her socialist party's largest rival, initially rejected her candidacy, it eventually voted in its favour after all of the other parliamentary groups in the national assembly announced their support for it. She left the Socialist Party in order to take up her new position, as Bulgarian law doesn't allow the ombudsman to be a member of a political party.

Manolova was extremely active during her tenure as Ombudsman, helping push through several landmark laws as she positioned herself as a "defender of the little people", which made her very popular among the Bulgarian public. By early 2019, she was one of the only two Bulgarian politicians (the other being President Rumen Radev) with an approval rating above 50%. She resigned as Ombudsman in early September 2019, citing "systematic neglect of the ombudsman institution" and a "lack of political will" by the National Assembly, as well as her intention to run for Mayor of Sofia, Bulgaria's capital and largest city.

=== Candidate for Mayor of Sofia ===
After resigning as Ombudsman, she entered into the race for Mayor of Sofia in the 2019 Bulgarian local elections as an independent candidate without a formal affiliation to a political party. Nevertheless, the Sofia branch of the Bulgarian Socialist Party decided to support and formally endorse her candidacy several days later on 11 September. Her candidacy was deemed as the first serious left-wing challenge for the position of Mayor of Sofia since the end of the socialist period, as following the end of that period Sofia was typically seen as a very safe election for GERB and a stronghold of centre-right and right-wing politics.

Following the first round of the election Manolova secured a runoff round, in which she faced longstanding Mayor of Sofia Yordanka Fandakova from Bulgaria's ruling GERB party. Although her opponent Fandakova failed to secure a majority of votes even on the second round of the election, she was nevertheless elected as Mayor of Sofia, as she managed a lead over Manolova by about 4% of the vote.

Manolova expressed doubts as to the fairness of the election, expressing the opinion that "the entirety of the Bulgarian underground had been mobilized" to swing the election in favour of her opponent.

A week after the vote, Manolova officially filed a motion before the Bulgarian judiciary for the election in Sofia to be annulled and rerun, presenting 14 folders of what she dubbed as evidence of "heavy violations" of Bulgaria's electoral code and law, which she deemed had undermined the fairness of the election and skewed its result.

In addition, she filed another civil lawsuit for 15,000 Bulgarian lev against Bulgarian Prime Minister and GERB leader Boyko Borisov personally. She accused Borisov of "false" and "defamatory" comments due to a statement he made in a television interview in the run-up to the second round of the election, in which he accused her of illegally buying votes from Romani in one of Sofia's districts. She pledged that if granted, she would donate all of the proceeds to fund the construction of a children's playground in that district.

=== Political project ===
In late 2019, following Sofia's Mayoral election, Manolova launched a civic movement Stand Up.BG, which she stated would not become a political party or affiliate itself to such, but would leverage political demands against Bulgaria's government. She stated that she would not run for leadership of Bulgaria's Socialist Party, nor for President of Bulgaria, and would instead dedicate her work to her new project. She described the project as a "civic platform" on a national scale, which would aim to coordinate actions of individual citizens and NGOs to "fight against monopolies and overconstruction and for living wages, a fair business environment, the lessening of the administrative burden on citizens and the securing of fair elections".

After the April 2021 Bulgarian parliamentary elections, the coalition which she led, Stand up! Mafia, get out! (later, Stand Up.BG! We are coming!), was part of the 45th and 46th Bulgarian National Assembly. During those National Assemblies Manolova headed a parliamentary commission which revised the 11-year rule of GERB. Despite numerous efforts from her parliamentary group and the one of Democratic Bulgaria, they could not reach an agreement with the first political power There is Such a People to form a government. Manolova and the leader of Democratic Bulgaria Hristo Ivanov shared their concerns that There is Such a People's actions were dictated by the Movement for Rights and Freedoms and GERB. Tensions rose so much that once Manolova accused Slavi Trifonov from the parliamentary tribune of trying to persuade her to not become a candidate for mayor of Sofia back in 2019 "for something in return". In November 2021 there were both parliamentary and presidential elections. The coalition Stand Up.BG! We are coming! led by Manolova was the first one to support the run for re-election of the incumbent President Rumen Radev. He went on to win the presidential elections, but Manolova's formation could not enter parliament. After the coalition could not enter parliament, it dissolved itself. As Manolova said, they achieved their goal to take down GERB and now each of the members had to go in their path - either to the left or to the right of the political spectrum.

In 2022 Manolova announced that the civic platform Stand Up.BG would evolve into a political party - Stand up Bulgaria. The founding congress of the party was held on May 1, 2022 and was attended by 857 people. According to the political declaration of the party, the main goal of Stand Up Bulgaria is for Bulgarians to live in a fair, social state, without poverty and inequalities, with the rule of law and intransigence towards corruption, for Bulgaria to be a country with a high standard of living, an innovative economy, affordable quality education and health care for all and clean nature. During this time, Manolova was one of the main critics of the Petkov Government because of the inflation and the energy crisis. Her main target for critics was the economic vice-prime minister and leader of BSP Korneliya Ninova. According to Manolova, although Ninova claimed that no ammunition would be sent to Ukraine, her signature as minister of economics was under every deal for weapon export. After the motion of no confidence made the government resign, early elections followed. Stand Up Bulgaria participated with the mothers of handicapped children from The System Kills Us. During the elections campaign, Manolova's formation presented itself as the new pro-European left. Its main causes were peace due to the Russian invasion of Ukraine, increased social spendings by the government, decrease of energy prices and gasoline, and the rights of handicapped people. The formation could not enter parliament.

In the end of 2022 and the beginning of 2023 Manolova participated in left forums, organised by former BSP member Kostadin Paskalev, which aimed to form a wide left coalition that would serve as an alternative to BSP. Following these events was formed the coalition The Left! which participated in the 2023 parliamentary elections in the country. Despite expectations created by polls, the coalition could not enter parliament. The coalition later participated in the 2023 Bulgarian local elections and was together with BSP raised Vanya Grigorova as a candidate for mayor of Sofia. Grigorova reached the second round of the elections and lost by 1%. During the summer of 2023 due to the rising tensions surrounding the proposed removal of the Monument of the Soviet Army in Sofia, Manolova and her supporters organised a camp in front of the monument as a sign of protest against the removal.

In April 2024, Manolova's Stand Up, Bulgaria joined the Bulgarian Left and United Social Democracy parties to form the Solidary Bulgaria coalition for the June 2024 Bulgarian parliamentary and European Parliament elections. The coalition was represented by Sofia municipal councillor Vanya Grigorova, while Manolova headed its candidate list in Sofia's 23rd electoral district and Shumen. In the parliamentary election, Solidary Bulgaria received 31,476 votes, or 1.47% of the vote. In the same election, The Left!, from which Manolova had split, received 15,175 votes, down from 56,481 in 2023; Solidary Bulgaria's vote total was equivalent to roughly three-quarters of that decline.

In September 2024, Stand Up Bulgaria joined BSP – United Left, a broader coalition centred on the Bulgarian Socialist Party, for the October 2024 parliamentary election. Manolova participated in the coalition's campaign, although she had announced that she would not stand on its candidate lists. Stand Up Bulgaria withdrew from the coalition due to BSP forming a government with GERB and DPS which Manolova called "a kiss of death".

In February 2025, Manolova became involved in a series of nationwide consumer boycotts of major supermarket chains over food prices. The first boycott, held on 13 February, was initiated by the Federation of Consumers in Bulgaria, the Association for Affordable and Quality Food, the United Pensioners' Unions and The System Is Killing Us, and was publicly supported by Manolova. According to government figures based on supermarket fiscal-device data, turnover at the major retail chains fell by 28.8% compared with the previous day, from BGN 27.3 million on 12 February to BGN 19.4 million on 13 February.

Manolova subsequently joined the initiative committee organising further actions and announced a second supermarket boycott for 20 February. Further boycotts were held on 27 February and 6 March. Participation varied between the actions: data from the National Revenue Agency showed that supermarket turnover during the second boycott fell by slightly more than 4%, substantially less than during the first. The organisers also called for measures concerning food mark-ups, unfair practices in the food supply chain and banking fees. Manolova drafted a bill for capping markups on staple food and non-foods which she proposed in parliament.

On 6 June 2025, Stand Up BG, together with the Federation of Consumers in Bulgaria, the Association for Affordable and Quality Food, the United Pensioners' Unions and the Your Voice civic platform, launched the Antispekula ("Anti-speculation") initiative. The online platform was established to monitor changes in prices and allow consumers to report suspected unjustified price increases and unfair commercial practices during Bulgaria's transition from the lev to the euro. Initially, the organisers monitored prices of essential goods and fuels. On 24 June, they also presented the Antispekula mobile application, which allowed users to submit reports concerning food and other essential goods, medicines, fuels, retail practices and services including banking and telecommunications.

The organisations involved in Antispekula also prepared proposed legislation on price controls for essential goods and services. The bill was introduced in the National Assembly on 16 July 2025 and included measures concerning basic food products, medicines, fuels and certain service charges. The National Assembly adopted the bill at first reading on 14 January 2026. A draft committee report for its second reading was published in February 2026, but the bill had not completed the legislative process by September 2026.

In March 2025, Manolova was nominated for a second term as Ombudsman of Bulgaria by 23 civil and professional organisations, with additional organisations subsequently expressing support for her candidacy. Six candidates were considered by the National Assembly. On 18 July, Manolova's candidacy received 38 votes in favour, 65 against and 114 abstentions and was not elected; Parliament instead elected Velislava Delcheva as ombudsman.

=== Commission for Consumer Protection ===
On 17 September 2026, the Bulgarian government appointed Manolova chairperson of the Commission for Consumer Protection, succeeding acting chair Aleksandar Kolyachev. The Commission is the state body responsible for enforcing consumer-protection legislation and supervising unfair commercial practices and the safety of goods and services on the Bulgarian market. Among the first actions announced after Manolova took office were nationwide inspections of petrol stations over possible unjustified increases in fuel prices, with the commission also stating that it would examine price increases in food and non-prescription medicines and unfair contractual terms in consumer services.

== Personal life ==
Manolova was married to Milen Manolov, a customs officer from her home town. She had one daughter from this marriage. She divorced him in 2007. She married Angel Naidenov, a politician from the Socialist Party, on 2 October 2016. Manolova speaks English and Russian in addition to her native Bulgarian. Manolova has a daughter and a grandson.
