= Nikolay Hadjigenov =

Bulgarian politician

Nikolay Hadjigenov Николай Хаджигенов Member of Parliament

Member of the 45th and 46th National Assembly
- Incumbent
- Assumed office 15 April 2021
- Constituency: 25 MIR, Sofia

Personal details
- Born: Nikolay Dimitrov Hadjigenov; 30 June 1971 (age 54) Sofia, People's Republic of Bulgaria
- Party: Poisonous Trio; Stand Up.BG! We are coming! (2020-2021); We are Coming (2021-present)
- Education: New Bulgarian University
- Occupation: Politician, Lawyer, Public figure
- Profession: Advocate

Nikolay Dimitrov Hadjigenov (Bulgarian: Николай Димитров Хаджигенов; born 30 June 1971) is a Bulgarian lawyer, public figure and politician.

== Childhood and education ==
Nikolay Hadjigenov was born on June 30, 1971, in the city of Sofia. He graduated in law from the New Bulgarian University. He is a known public rights activist and criminal defence attourney, who often discusses civil and political issues on his personal blog. He gained recognition for being the defence attourney of Desislava Ivancheva, the former mayor of the Mladost District in Sofia.

Hadjigenov is one of the organizers of the 2020–2021 Bulgarian protests and an outspoken opposer to the corrupt rule and oligarchy that consume Bulgarian jurisprudence, politics and business.

He was elected a Member of Parliament in the 45th National Assembly, from the 25th MIR, in the city of Sofia, from the quota of the Stand Up! Mafia, Get Out! coalition. He was elected a Member of Parliament in the 46th National Assembly, from the 25th MIR, in the city of Sofia, from the quota of the coalition "Stand Up.BG! We are coming!".

== Public activity ==
In March 2021, the position of the Stand Up! Mafia, Get Out! coalition was published in the 24 Chasa newspaper, which declared itself against gay marriage and the Istanbul Convention. After this statement, Nikolay Hadjigenov, together with Viktor Lilov - the only openly gay candidate for MP in the 45th National Assembly, held a meeting with the LGBTI community.

Lawyer Hadjigenov publicly supports the fight for the rights of LGBTI people, but states his support as a personal position, not on behalf of the coalition.
