= Technoliberalism =

Political ideology

Technoliberalism is a political ideology founded on ideas of liberty, individuality, responsibility, decentralization, and self-awareness. It also highlights an idea that technology should be available to everyone with minimal controls. Its core beliefs fit under five main interests that include Construction of the Government, Economics, Civil Liberties, Education and Science, and Environment. Technoliberals support such ideas as the balance of powers in the government, decentralization, affordable education, the protection of planet Earth, and the freedom of speech.

== Outline ==
In his book titled Technoliberalism the End of Participatory Culture in the United States, Adam Fish describes technoliberalism as a belief that networked technologies ameliorate the contradictions of a society that cherishes both the free market of economic liberalism and the social welfare of social liberalism. In this manner, technoliberalism has some links to neo-liberalism, yet with some core differences; "While Adam Smith conceived of a market that was in a way a natural and ineradicable part of the landscape (based on the human propensity 'to truck, barter and exchange'), and neoliberal thought continues to see the market in this way, technoliberalism holds up the idea that such complex systems can be contrived in their entirety." At the centre of the ideology of Technoliberalism as a belief and a movement is "an overriding faith in technology, a suspicion of conventional modernist (top-down) institutions and a conviction that the aggregate effects of individual engagement of technology will generate social goods" Technoliberalism is about the combining of decentralism, individualism, responsibility and self-awareness, nothing in excess, sustainability, and engineering style regulation and governance. Its core beliefs fit under five main interests; Construction of the Government, Education and Science, Economics, the Environment, and Civil Liberties. They include:

- The protection of the individuals' freedom, whilst maintaining that of others.
- Free markets with strongly enforced rules.
- Fair taxation, especially of big companies.
- The protection of our planet through strong regulation on damage to the environment.
- The power of small and medium-sized businesses.
- The freedom of speech and communication technologies.
- The emphasis on technological advancements instead of the status quo.

== Networked technology ==
- High-speed development of networked technology provides the platform for spreading information which encourages the freedom of speech and communication technologies.
- Networks of distributed intelligence increase the capacity of information technology.
- Free access to the Internet deeply reflects the idea of technoliberalism.
- New forms of networked technology appear such as Current TV and mobile network which increase the opportunity in pursuing democratization. But one of the civil liberty is net neutrality for landline Internet and no net neutrality for mobile and satellites.
- Cultural myths impact the success of digital democracy as much or more than technology.

== Economic freedom ==
=== Businesses ===
Economic freedom in terms of technoliberalism involves small scale capitalism, that is capitalism for small and medium-sized businesses, rather than corporate organizations created by major interest groups. Ideally, localized systems and community ties will pave the way for a new capitalist economy, undoing the power of global capitalism. Implemented trust regulations will complement this, meaning more rules for big companies to create better competition, whereas smaller companies will be enforced with fewer rules. Technoliberalism places an emphasis on these small and medium-sized businesses because it can help boost economic growth. Money spent by local authorities with small firms is re-spent into the local economy, compared to that spent with large businesses in the same area. Doing business this way then, is better value for money.

=== Rules ===
Decentralization is also a key ideological idea to technoliberalism, sought to work through the deregulation of rules that stop businesses competing with the government services. Decentralization means distributing the power away from the center of an organization, diffusing authority outwards to workers in the field. The rapid growth of information technology has aided this concept as the likes of the internet have made the distribution of information accessible and cheap. On the other hand, is the ideological idea of free markets. Strongly enforced rules would be needed here as this type of market would be based on supply and demand with little government control. Technoliberals believe that knowledge and technology can be geographically transferred without much difficulty or state action, envisaging a completely free market where buyers and sellers are allowed to transact unreservedly, based on a mutual agreement on price without state intervention in the form of taxes, subsidies or regulation. Whilst this is an idealized view, it would be hard to implement.

=== Taxation ===
Technoliberals believe in negative income tax. This is the idea that people earning below a certain amount receive supplemental pay from the government, instead of paying taxes to the government. This ensures that there is a minimum level of income for all. Whilst common criticisms revolve around the fact that negative income tax could reduce the incentive to work, Technoliberals want to ensure there is a basic level of income available to everyone. Equally, technoliberalism wants fair taxation of big companies. Controversies involving multinational companies abusing tax rules, means Technoliberals want to see fair tax being paid by big businesses. Ideas such as the Fair Tax Mark are already in progress.

== Free speech ==
Technoliberalism is seen as 21st century liberalism. New technologies and social networking sites allow for the free speech of citizens to voice their views. The discussions surrounding technoliberalism involve:

- Decentralism
- Individualism, Responsibility and Self-Awareness.
- Nothing In Excess.
- Sustainability.
- Engineering-Style Regulation and Governance.

== Citizen responsibility ==
Citizen responsibility in ‘Technoliberalism’ refers to the protection of the individuals' freedom while maintaining that of others. Techno-liberals look for change. By their nature, they're not satisfied with the way things are and want to find new ways to do things. Liberals in technology arena move a society forward as the opportunists. Techno-liberalism represents socio-cultural perspectives that imply all human endeavors. This includes how we develop and use technology, especially computer technology. In the technology arena, liberalism normally points to innovation and risk-taking. Furthermore, if you're a techno-liberal in information technology, the future can't come soon enough. For those who see the true promise of the web for multi-media and as a general platform for application software, the Internet is still far too slow and primitive.

== Worldwide examples ==
Technoliberalism is a good example of liberalism with Scientific and technological advancement plus advanced education, but there is no country that adheres to technoliberalism. There are no examples of Real World Application of this form of Government.

=== Construction of the government ===
To construct a government, power will be balanced and peer-reviewing everything is a core principle. Moreover, there will be separation of concerns and convention over configuration. For example, in United Kingdom, the prime minister leads the government with the support of the Cabinet and ministers. While departments and their agencies are responsible for putting government policy into practice and the public can engage with government through consultations and petitions to inform and influence the decisions it makes.

=== Economics ===
Small scale capitalism, which means, capitalism for small and medium-sized business instead of corporate capitalism; decentralization. The Negative Income Tax or Universal Basic Income in addition trust regulation are examples of technoliberalism in the economic aspect. For example, European Union competition law to control large, potentially monopolistic companies by applying more regulations to them, while applying less harsh regulations for smaller companies. The main goal for this is that only consumer welfare considerations are relevant there.

=== Civil liberties ===
In today's society, free access to the Internet with the freedom to discuss different issues was a well-known example of technoliberalism.

=== Education and science ===
Technoliberalism can be found in examples relating to education and scientific fields. Within science some examples include more engineers and scientists within the political industry and free science on genetic engineering. Examples included in Education can be the following:

- Tuition fee for Bachelor / Master for every student -> 3% of GDPpA per capita,
- Secondary education for every student -> 0.5% of GDPpA per capita,
- Primary education for every student: -> 0.1% of GDPpA per capita.

=== Environment ===
Examples of how technoliberalism can be applied to the environment are the following:

- Higher taxes on fossil fuels and anything that is damaging the environment
- Emissions trading / cap and trade
- Car-free Cities.
- Genetic engineering (also for food) must be allowed
