= Nikola Minchev =

Bulgarian politician and lawyer (born 1987)

- Никола Минчев
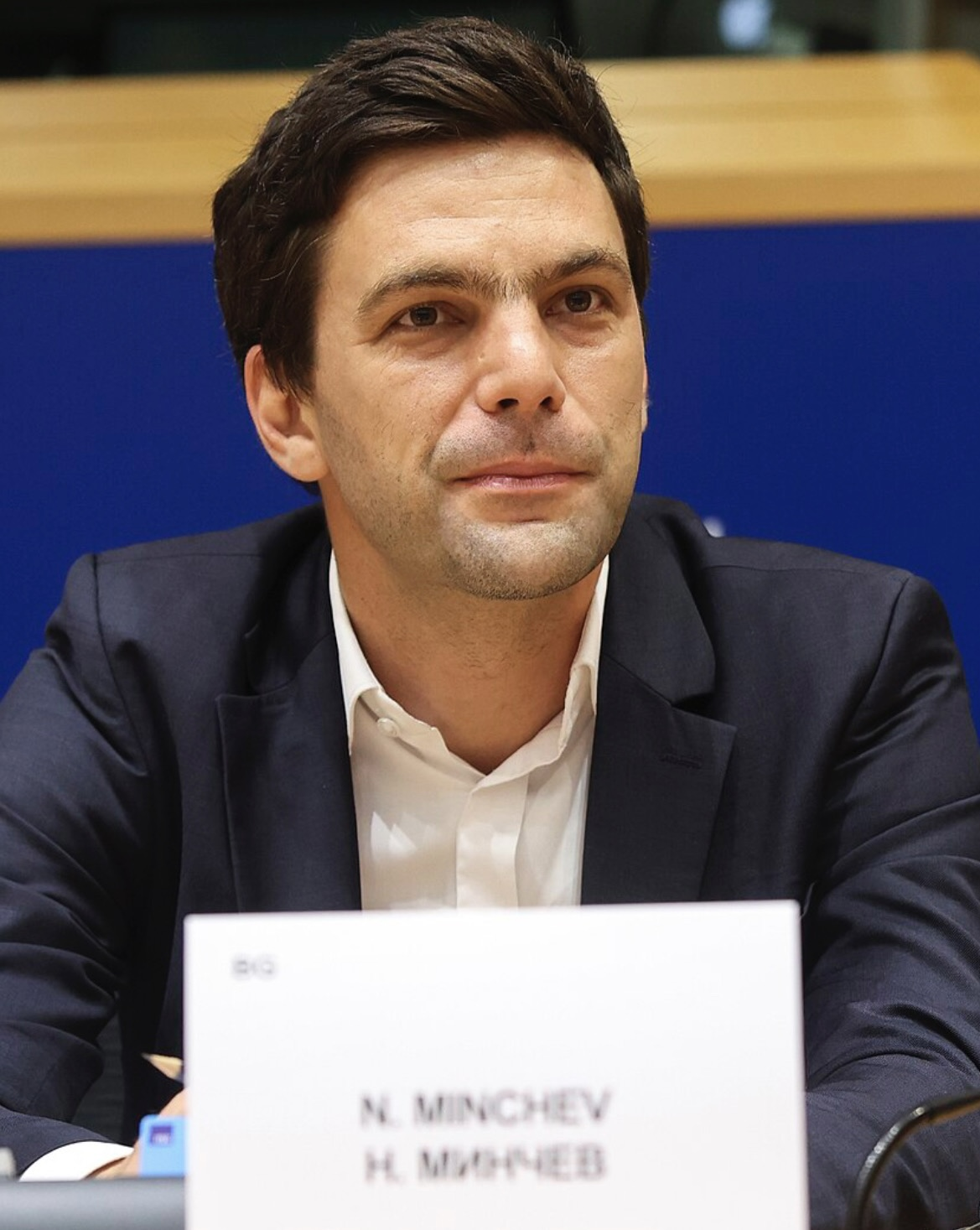
- Minchev in 2024

Member of the European Parliament for Bulgaria
- Incumbent
- Assumed office 16 July 2024

Speaker of the National Assembly
- In office 3 December 2021 – 16 June 2022
- Preceded by: Iva Miteva
- Succeeded by: Vezhdi Rashidov

Member of the National Assembly
- In office 3 December 2021 – 19 June 2024
- Constituency: 24th MMC - Sofia (2021–2022); 16th MMC - Plovdiv (2022–2024)

Personal details
- Born: Nikola Georgiev Minchev; 13 September 1987 (age 39) Sofia, PR Bulgaria
- Party: We Continue the Change
- Other political affiliations: Renew Europe
- Children: 2
- Education: Sofia University (LLB, LLM)
- Occupation: Politician; lawyer

Nikola Georgiev Minchev (Bulgarian: Никола Георгиев Минчев; born 13 September 1987) is a Bulgarian politician. He was elected MEP at the 2024 European Parliament election. A member of the PP party, he previously served as Speaker of the National Assembly from 2021 to 2022 and Member of the National Assembly from 2021 to 2024.

== Early life ==
Minchev was born in Sofia on 13 September 1987. He graduated from the German High School in Sofia, after which he obtained a master's degree in law from Sofia University.

== Career ==
=== Lawyer ===
Minchev began his career at Djingov, Guginski, Kyuchukov and Velichkov, Bulgaria's largest law firm. He defended clients before the Arbitration Court of the International Chamber of Commerce. He participated in conferences and lectured at the Energy Law Group (European Network of Lawyers in the Field of Energy Law). He was quoted saying that good laws can be achieved with good lawyers so that young people do not have to choose between happiness in Bulgaria and opportunities abroad.

=== Chairman of National Assembly ===
Bulgaria's parliament elected Minchev as Chairman of the 47th National Assembly on their first session. He was elected in a 158–1 vote with 72 abstentions.

In his first address to Parliament as Chairman he stated, "Today we set the start of the new Parliament. We are in the favourable stead of people who have recently won the trust of the Bulgarians. However, this favorable position is about to end. We are now faced with tackling the more difficult task of living up to the expectations and trust put in us." In his first interview, he said the closure of the specialised court and prosecutor's office was one of the priorities of the 47th National Assembly. He called for the common will of parliament to be reflected in quality discussion, saying "to restore the spirit of mutual understanding and a new model of quality policy. I will work for the Bulgarian Parliament to be a place for free and constructive debates and discussions".

Minchev announced that some changes in the rules of procedure would be done. One possible correction concerned political nomadism - the transfer of members of one parliamentary group to another.

In May 2025, President of the European Parliament Roberta Metsola requested that Minchev's parliamentary immunity be lifted with regard to a bribery investigation against Huawei.
