= Slaveykov Square =

Square in Sofia, Bulgaria

Coordinates: 42°41′31″N 23°19′27″E

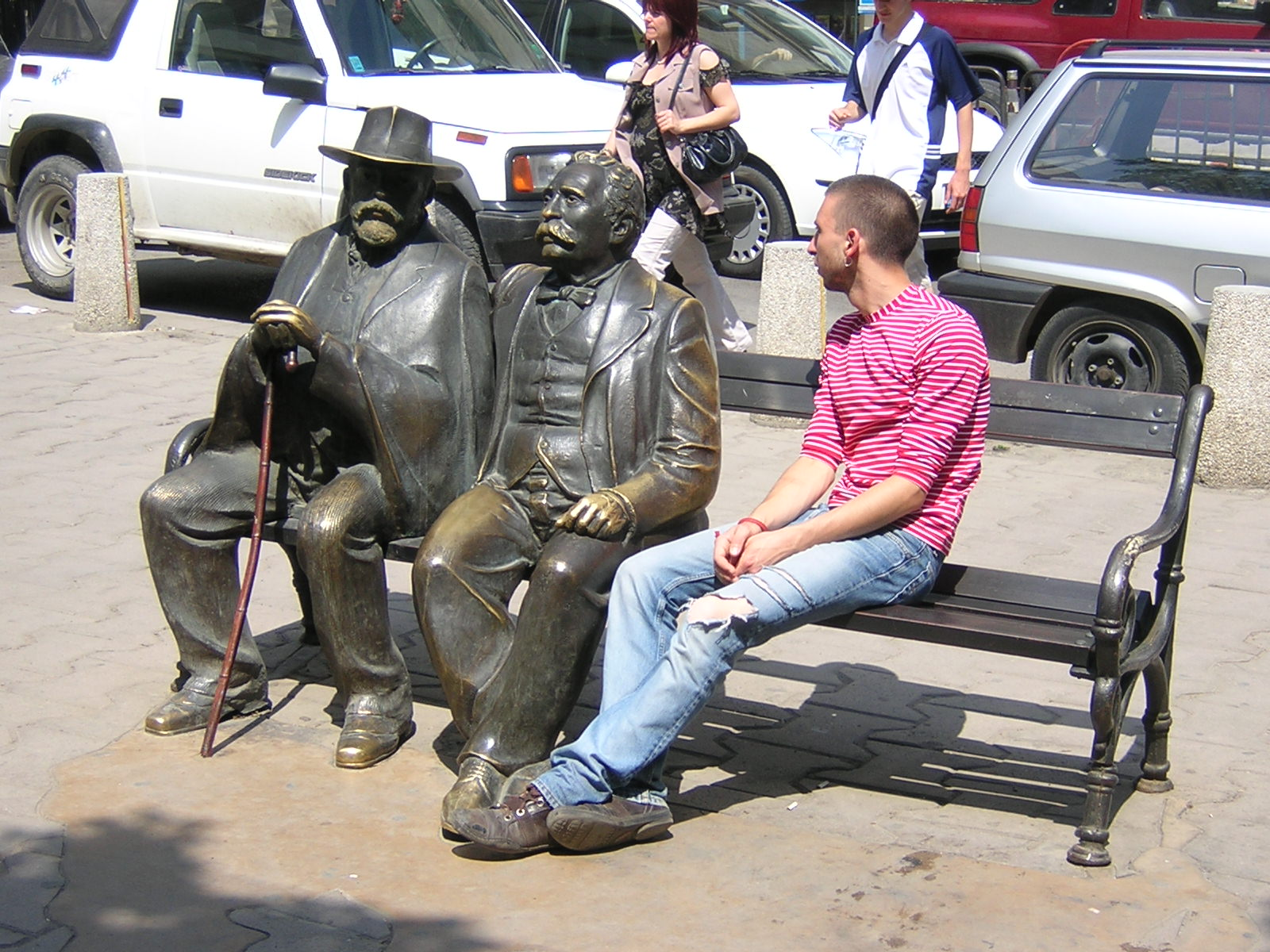
The sculpture of Petko and Pencho Slaveykov (right to left)

Slaveykov Square (Bulgarian: Площад Славейков) is one of the most popular squares in Sofia, the capital of Bulgaria. It is named after Bulgarian writers Petko and Pencho Slaveykov, father and son. A sculpture of the two sitting on a bench is one of its main landmarks.

A square called Kafene Başi is first mentioned to have existed at the modern place in 1515. A coffeehouse, a mosque, and two Turkish police stations were situated there.

In the 17th century, the square was an important crossroad stretching from modern Sveta Nedelya Square to Vitosha Boulevard and featured a fountain.

After the liberation of Bulgaria, the square was extended, and many one- and two-story houses with gardens were erected on the site, one of which belonged to Petko Slaveykov, whose name the square later took.

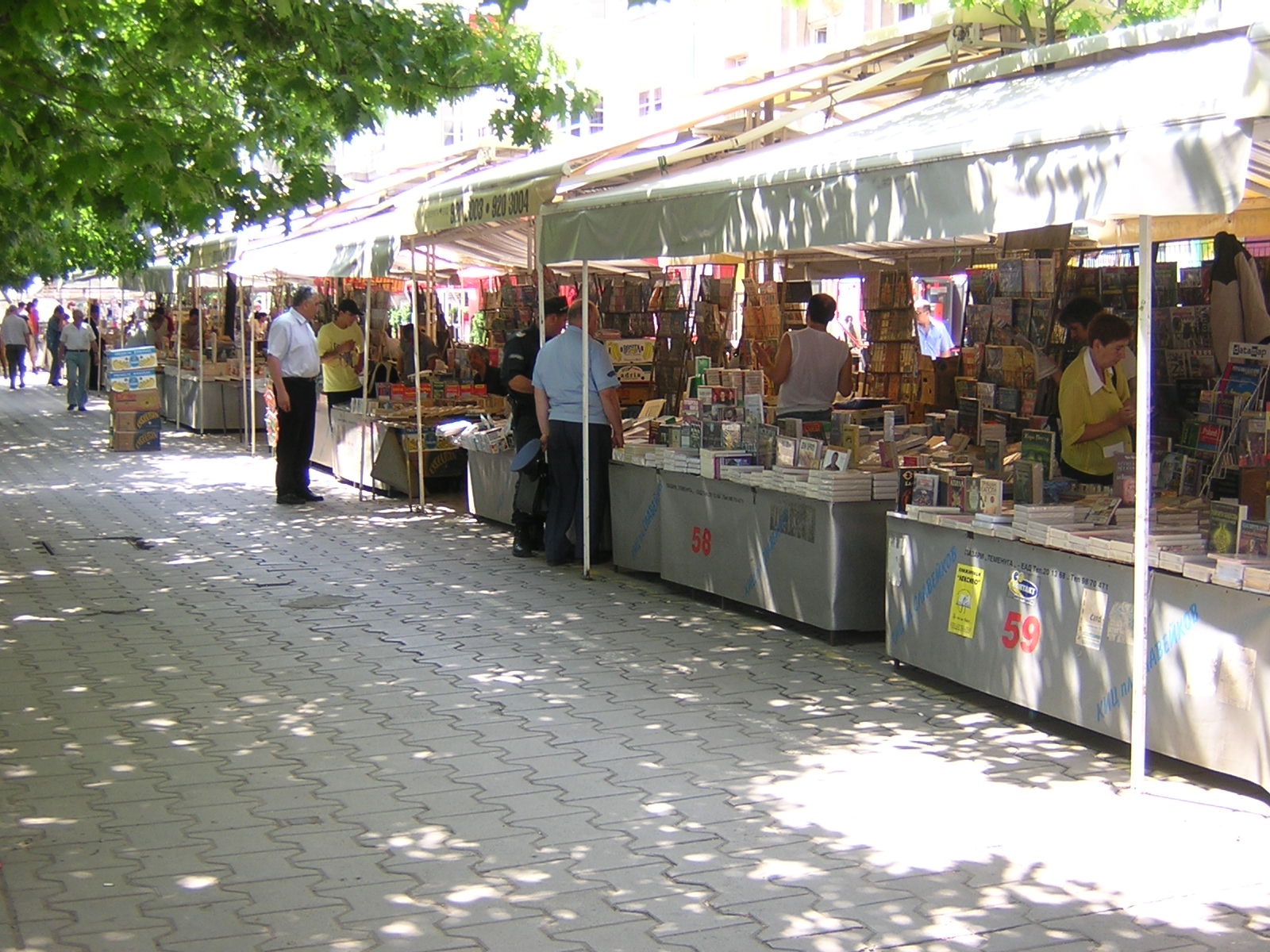
Bookstalls on the square

During the 1920s and 1930s, Slaveykov Square formed its modern appearance, with five- to seven-storey buildings featuring a shop on the ground floor. The first significant constructions appeared in this period — the Teachers' Fund (1924). the Ministry of Public Works (1928), and the French Institute (1934).

After 1944, the automobile traffic around the square was gradually limited, and it turned into a pedestrian area.

In the years following 1990, the square became a preferred place for booksellers, and many bookshops emerged on it. This is probably because the Sofia City Library is at the square.
