= Bulgaria for Citizens Movement =

Bulgarian political party

Movement "Bulgaria of the Citizens" Движение „България на гражданите“ Dvizhenie „Bulgariya na grazhdanite“
- Leader: Yordan Yordanov
- Founded: 1 July 2012
- Split from: National Movement for Stability and Progress
- Headquarters: Sofia
- Ideology: Liberal conservatism Liberalism; Conservatism
- Political position: Centre to centre-right
- National affiliation: Reformist Bloc (2013–2017); Stand Up.BG! We are coming! (2021–2023); PP–DB (2023); Blue Bulgaria (2024–)
- European affiliation: European People's Party
- Colours: Blue and Green
- National Assembly: 0 / 240
- European Parliament: 0 / 17
- Municipalities: 1 / 265

Website
- grajdani.bg

Bulgaria for Citizens Movement (Bulgarian: Движение „България на гражданите“, ДБГ, romanized: Dvizhenie „Bulgariya na grazhdanite“, lit. 'Movement "Bulgaria of the Citizens"') is a political party in Bulgaria, founded by former European Commissioner and National Movement for Stability and Progress member Meglena Kuneva on July 1, 2012.

== Party Platform ==
The party has identified three key planks on which they will run the 2013 election.

The first plank, entitled "The Citizen", aims at bringing in more control mechanisms on power, removing obstacles from holding referendums at a local level and steps towards the adoption of a new constitution.

The second plank, entitled "The Economy" describes the party’s dedication towards the growth and stability of the economy. The party is also preparing to bring in "real" reforms in health care, education and old age pensions. The party wishes to return the economy to its pre-2009 level and guide the economy towards above-average EU growth.

The third plank, entitled "Bulgaria of the Future", aims at a radical reform of the judiciary. It calls for the direct election of Supreme Court judges as well as the removal of the prosecution from the justice system.

== List of chairmen ==
- Meglena Kuneva (2012–2017)
- Dimitar Delchev (2017–2023)
- Yordan Yordanov (2023–present)

== Important members ==
- Plamen Konstantinov
- Nayden Zelenogorski

== Election results ==
=== National Assembly ===
Election	Leader	Votes	%	Seats	+/–	Government
2013	Meglena Kuneva	115,190	3.25 (#6)	0 / 240	New	Extra-parliamentary
2014 (Note: Run as part of the Reformist Bloc coalition.)	Meglena Kuneva	291,806	8.89 (#4)	23 / 240	▲23	Coalition
2017	Meglena Kuneva	107,407	3.06 (#6)	0 / 240	▼23	Extra-parliamentary
Apr 2021 (Note: Run as part of the Stand Up! Mafia, Get Out! coalition.)	Dimitar Delchev	150,940	4.65 (#6)	1 / 240	▲1	Snap election
Jul 2021	Dimitar Delchev	136,885	4.95 (#6)	2 / 240	▲1	Snap election
Nov 2021 (Note: Run as part of the Stand Up.BG! We are coming! coalition.)	Dimitar Delchev	60,055	2.26 (#8)	0 / 240	▼2	Extra-parliamentary
2022	Did not contest			0 / 240	0	Extra-parliamentary
2023	Did not contest			0 / 240	0	Extra-parliamentary
Jun 2024 (Note: Run as part of the Blue Bulgaria coalition.)	Yordan Yordanov	33,613	1.52 (#9)	0 / 240	0	Extra-parliamentary
2026	Did not contest			0 / 240	0	Extra-parliamentary

=== European Parliament ===
Election	List leader	Votes	%	Seats	+/–	EP Group
2024 (Note: Run as part of the Blue Bulgaria coalition.)	Tsveta Kirilova	24,917	1.24 (#10)	0 / 17	New	–
