= Stand Up.BG! We are coming! =

Bulgarian political alliance

Stand Up.BG! We are coming! Изправи се.БГ! Ние идваме!
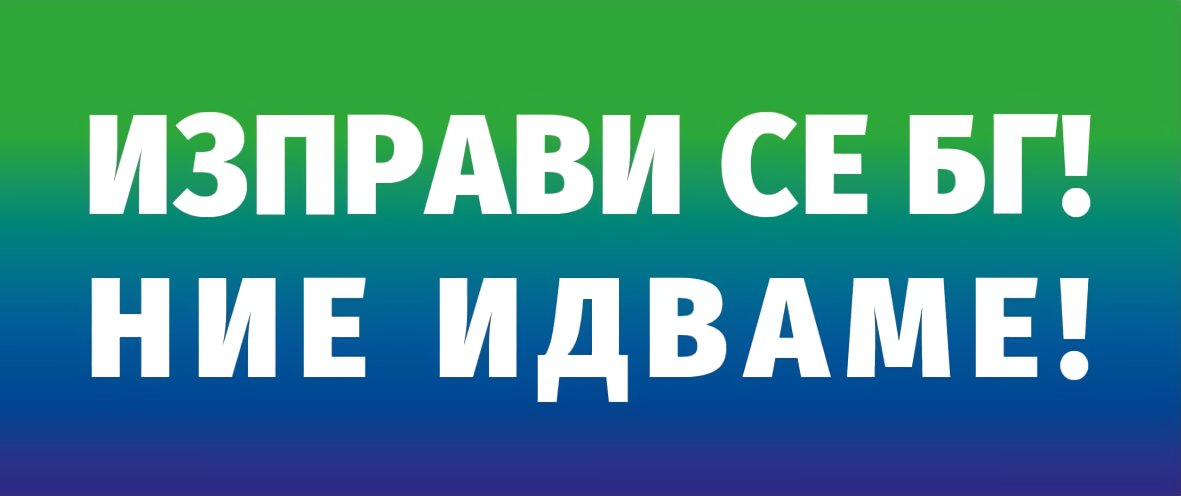
- Abbreviation: IBG-NI
- Leader: Maya Manolova
- Founders: Maya Manolova; Nikolay Hadjigenov; Tatyana Doncheva; Arman Babikyan; Mariya Kapon
- Founded: 7 February 2021 (ISMV coalition); 21 July 2021 (IBG-NI parliamentary group)
- Dissolved: 2 August 2022
- Succeeded by: The Left! (partly)
- Ideology: Anti-corruption; Pro-Europeanism; Factions; Social democracy; Social liberalism; Liberal conservatism
- Political position: Centre to left-wing
- Member parties: Stand Up.BG; The Poisonous Trio; Bulgaria for Citizens; Movement 21; United People's Party; Agrarian People's Union
- Colours: Green Blue

Website
- izpravise.bg

Stand Up.BG! We are coming! (Bulgarian: Изправи се.БГ! Ние идваме!, romanized: Izpravi se.BG! Nie idvame!; IBG-NI), until 20 July 2021 known as Stand up! Mafia, Get Out! (Bulgarian: Изправи се! Мутри вън!, romanized: Izpravi se! Mutri van!; ISMV) was a coalition of political parties in Bulgaria established by leaders of Stand Up.BG and The Poisonous Trio (Otrovnoto trio), also including Movement 21 (D21), the Bulgaria for Citizens Movement (DBG), the United People's Party and the Agrarian People's Union (ZNS)

== Name ==
The second part of the former name of the party, "Mafia, get out!" (Bulgarian: Мутри вън!, romanized: Mutri van!, мутра, pl. мутри being a slang word for mafia member), was taken directly from president Rumen Radev's final words in his speech in 9 July 2020 in front of the gathered crowd which was one of the factors that sparked the 2020–2021 anti-government protests. In his speech, Radev called for the expulsion of the Bulgarian mafia from the executive and the judiciary.

On 20 July 2021, the party changed its name to "Stand Up.BG! We are coming!"

== Election results ==
National Assembly
Election	Votes	%	Seats	+/–	Government
Apr 2021	150,940	4.72 (6th)	14 / 240		Snap election
Jul 2021	136,885	5.01 (6th)	13 / 240	▼1	Snap election
Nov 2021	60,057	2.26 (8th)	0 / 240	▼13	Extra-parliamentary

== See also ==
- The Left (Bulgaria)
