= 2015 Bulgarian electoral code referendum =

25 October 2015
- Do you support being able to vote remotely electronically when conducting elections and referenda?

Results
Choice	Votes	%
Yes	1,883,411	72.79%
No	704,182	27.21%
Valid votes	2,587,593	95.49%
Invalid or blank votes	122,339	4.51%
Total votes	2,709,932	100.00%
Registered voters/turnout	6,766,619	40.05%
- Results by municipality Yes: 50-60% 60-70% 70-80%

A referendum on introducing electronic voting was held in Bulgaria on 25 October 2015 alongside local elections. Although the referendum resulted was approved by a wide margin, turnout was far below the required threshold to make its result binding.

== Background ==
A petition was introduced into the Bulgarian Parliament on 10 March 2013 by an Initiative Committee presided by professor Georgi Bliznashki on proposed changes to the electoral code of Bulgaria. These included: reintroducing first-past-the-post voting alongside proportional representation, making voting compulsory and introducing electronic voting. Under current Bulgarian law a referendum is mandatory if a petition receives at least five hundred thousand signatures. Supporters claimed to have 560,000 signatures on the petition, giving Parliament three months (until early June) to authenticate the signatures. Numerous signatures were nullified, however, and so the requirement of half of million authentic signatures was missed. Still, there were enough signatures to put the content up for debate before parliament. When the debate came in June, however, lawmakers rejected the idea of holding the referendum.

One of the elements in the petition, that of introducing mandatory voting, has been put forward by the leader of the Bulgarian Socialist Party, Sergei Stanishev, and has been endorsed by the leader of GERB, Boyko Borisov.

== Results ==
Choice	Votes	%
For	1,883,411	72.79
Against	704,182	27.21
Total	2,587,593	100.00
Valid votes	2,587,593	95.49
Invalid/blank votes	122,339	4.51
Total votes	2,709,932	100.00
Registered voters/turnout	6,766,619	40.05
Source: CEC
