= Nayden Zelenogorski =

Bulgarian politician (born 1961)

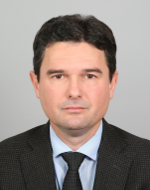
Nayden Zelenogorski

Nayden Zelenogorsky (born September 2, 1961) is a Bulgarian politician and former mayor of Pleven Municipality and a member of parliament.
