= Reformist Bloc =

2013–2017 Bulgarian political alliance

Reformist Bloc Реформаторски блок
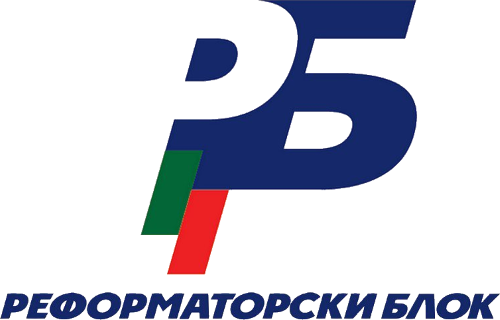
- Abbreviation: RB
- Leader: Radan Kanev (last)
- Founded: 20 December 2013
- Dissolved: 2016–2017
- Preceded by: Blue Coalition
- Succeeded by: Conservative Union of the Right; Democratic Bulgaria
- Headquarters: 134th Building, Rakovski St., Sofia
- Ideology: Christian democracy; Liberal conservatism; Conservative liberalism; Conservatism
- Political position: Centre-right
- European Parliament group: European People's Party
- Member parties: Union of Democratic Forces; Democrats for a Strong Bulgaria; Bulgarian New Democracy; People's Party "Freedom and Dignity"; Bulgarian Agrarian National Union; People's Voice; Bulgaria for Citizens Movement
- Colors: Dark blue
- 43rd National Assembly: 23 / 240
- 8th European Parliament: 1 / 17

Website
- reformatorskiblok.bg

The Reformist Bloc (Bulgarian: Реформаторски блок, romanized: Reformatorski blok) was a centre-right electoral alliance in Bulgaria.

== History ==
The coalition agreement to form the alliance was signed on 20 December 2013. The five parties that signed the agreement were: Democrats for a Strong Bulgaria, Bulgaria for Citizens Movement, Union of Democratic Forces, People's Party Freedom and Dignity, and the Bulgarian Agrarian National Union. At the time of signing the coalition the parties had one seat in the European Parliament but none in the National Assembly.

In early August 2014 spokesperson Radan Kanev resigned because of what he said was a lack of unity within the alliance: "The image of a united multi-party coalition was replaced by an image of a traditional coalition with many and often conflicting interests."

He initially supported the government, led by Prime Minister Boyko Borisov. Politicians from the Reformist Bloc received ministerial posts as coalition partners.

In December 2015, DSB turned into opposition because of the discontent with the speed and depth of the judicial reform by the second government of Boyko Borisov. Minister Petar Moskov retained his post but was excluded from his DSB leadership. This event marked a new flaw in the Reformist Bloc. The other coalition partners remained in the government. The Parliamentary Group of the Reformist Bloc does not split up. At the end of 2016 DSB left the block. In February 2017, the People's Party "Freedom and Dignity" left to join Lutvi Mestan's DOST.

== Elections ==
The electoral alliance made its debut in the 2014 European Parliament election. Meglena Kuneva, the leader of Bulgaria for Citizens Movement, was placed as number one on the party's list. However, Svetoslav Malinov from Democrats for Strong Bulgaria won the only place for the alliance in the European Parliament due to the preferential voting in his favour.

=== Statistics ===
European Parliament
Election	# of seats won	# of total votes	% of popular vote	rank
2014	1 / 17	144,532	6.45%	5th

Bulgarian National Assembly
Election	# of seats won	# of total votes	% of popular vote	rank
2014	23 / 240	291,806	8.89%	4th
2017	0 / 240	107,399	3.06%	6th

Traykov for President
Election	# of total votes (1st round)	% of popular vote (1st round)	rank (1st round)	# of total votes (2nd round)	% of popular vote (2nd round)	rank (2nd round)
2016	224,734	5.87%	6th	-	-	-

== See also ==
- Blue Coalition, a previous centre-right electoral alliance in Bulgaria
