= 2023 Bulgarian local elections =

- 29 October and 5 November 2023
Party	GERB–SDS	PP-DB	BSP
Provincial Mayoralities	14 (Note: Including GERB endorsed mayors not directly affiliated with GERB or SDS in Yambol and Pernik)	4	4
+/–	▼3	▲4	Steady
Party	DPS	ITN	SDS
Provincial Mayoralities	1	1	1 (Note: Since 2019 SDS and GERB have been coalition partners on the national level. Elected oblast mayors from SDS are thus only listed as "SDS" when they weren't endorsed by GERB and are otherwise included in GERB-SDS.)
+/–	Steady	▲1	▼1
Party	DBG	Others
Provincial Mayoralities	1	1
+/–	Steady	▼1
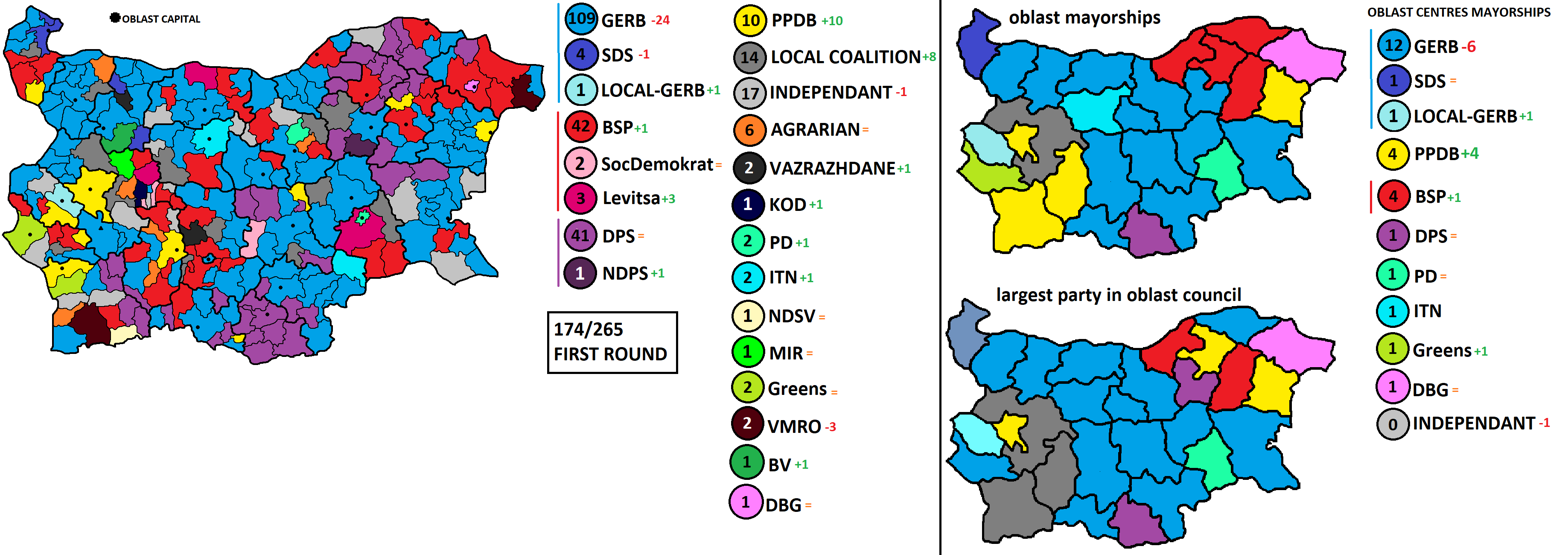

Local elections in Bulgaria were held on 29 October 2023. Mayors and municipal councillors across the country were elected.

== Electoral system ==
The elections to Bulgaria's municipal councils are conducted via proportional representation with an open list preferential voting system.

The mayoral elections take place within the context of a majoritarian two-round system. The first round of the elections will be held on 29 October. If no candidate in a given constituency manages to gain 50% of the vote, a runoff election will be held for that constituency in the second round on 5 November.

Voting is officially mandatory, but in practice there is no punishment for failing to vote and the law itself isn't strictly enforced.

Voters further have the option to vote against all proposed candidates.

== Contesting parties and Results ==
Name		Ideology	Position	Leader(s)	2023 result	
Name		Ideology	Position	Leader(s)	Votes (%)	Seats
BND	Bulgarian New Democracy	Conservative liberalism	Centre-right	Valery Timov	DNP	0 / 240
Svoboda	Freedom	Bulgarian nationalism	Right-wing	Vladimir Simenov	DNP	0 / 240
Zelenite	Party of the Greens	Green Politics; Anti-corruption	Syncretic	Vladimir Nikolov	Together (BG)	0 / 240
DD	Direct Democracy	Direct democracy	Syncretic	Petar Klisarov	DNP	0 / 240
DnG	Movement for Our Cities	Local politics	Centre	Atanas Kalchev	DNP	0 / 240
Volya	Volya	Bulgarian nationalism Right-wing populism	Right-wing	Veselin Mareshki	DNP	0 / 240
Revival	Revival	Ultranationalism; Russophilia	Far-right	Kostadin Kostadinov	13.58	37 / 240
NDPS	National Movement for Rights and Freedoms	Turkish Minority interests	Centre	Gyuner Tahir	DNP	0 / 240
Euroma	Euroroma	Romani Minority interests	Centre	Tsvetalin Kanchev	DNP	0 / 240
BSD	Bulgarian Social Democrats	Social democracy	Centre-left	Georgi Atanasov Mariya Dobreva	DNP	0 / 240
BSDE	Bulgarian Social Democracy -Euro Left	Social democracy	Centre-left	Aleksandar Tomov	0.10	0 / 240
SDS	Union of Democratic Forces	Christian democracy Conservatism	Centre-right	Rumen Hristov	(GERB-SDS)	2 / 240
KOD	Conservative Union of the Right	National conservatism Right-wing populism	Right-wing	Petar Moskov	0.29	0 / 240
ONB	Society for a New Bulgaria	National conservatism	Right-wing	Margarit Mitsev	DNP	0 / 240
OBT	United Block for Labour	Social democracy Labourism	Centre-left	Yekaterina Atanasova	DNP	0 / 240
Pravoto	Pravoto (political party)	Anti-corruption; Russophilia	Syncretic	Mariya Koleva	DNP	0 / 240
BDS-R	Bulgarian Democratic Union-Radicals	National conservatism	Right-wing	Tsvetan Manchev	DNP	0 / 240
Georges Day	George's Day Movement	National conservatism Right-wing populism	Right-wing	Dragomir Stefanov	(GERB-SDS)	1 / 240
PDS	Political Movement "Social Democrats"	Social democracy	Center-left	Yelena Noneva	DNP	0 / 240
ZS "AS"	Agrarian Union "Aleksandar Stamboliyski"	Social democracy Agrarianism	Center-left	Spas Panchev	(Levitsata!)	0 / 240
OZ	United Agrarians	Liberal conservatism Agrarianism	Center-right	Petya Stavreva	(PP-DB)	0 / 240
NI!	We are Coming!	Anti-corruption	Syncretic	Nikolay Hadjigenov; Armyan Babikyan	DNP	0 / 240
BV	Bulgarian Rise	National conservatism	Syncretic	Stefan Yanev	2.93	0 / 240
KB	Conservative Bulgaria	National conservatism	Right-wing	Boris Yachev	DNP	0 / 240
BPL	Bulgarian Progressive Line	Democratic Socialism	Left-wing	Krasimir Yankov	(Levitsata!)	0 / 240
BG	Bulgarian Voice	Anti-corruption; Right-wing populism	Syncretic	Georgi Popov	DNP	0 / 240
MIR	MIR (political party)	Left-wing nationalism	Center-left	Simeon Slavchov	0.10	0 / 240
GN	Peoples Voice	Right-wing populism	Right wing	Svetoslav Vitkov	0.21	0 / 240
DPS	Movement for Rights and Freedoms	Turkish minority interests Liberalism	Centre	Mustafa Karadaya	13.58	36 / 240
Velichie	Greatness	Anti-corruption	Syncretic	Albena Peskova	DNP	0 / 240
VMRO	VMRO-BNM	National conservatism Bulgarian nationalism	Right-wing to far-right	Angel Dzhambazki	DNP	0 / 240
BSDP	BSDP	Social democracy	Centre-left	Yordan Nihrizov	DNP	0 / 240
BZNS	BZNS	Agrarianism	Centre	Iliya Zyumbulev	DNP	0 / 240
SDP	Social Democratic Party	Social democracy	Centre-left	Todor Barobolov	Together (Bulgaria)	0 / 240
SP	Socialist Party "Bulgarian Way"	Socialism; Left-wing nationalism	Far-Left	Angel Dimov	0.03	0 / 240
SSD	Union of Free Democrats	Conservatism	Centre-right	Milan Lilanov	DNP	0 / 240
DNB	Movement "Forward Bulgaria"	Conservatism	Syncretic	Zoritsa Atanasova	DNP	0 / 240
ATAKA	Ataka	Bulgarian nationalism Russophilia	Far-Right	Volen Siderov	(Neutral Bulgaria)	0 / 240
BDF	Bulgarian Democratic Forum	Conservatism	Centre-right	Zhaklin Toleva	DNP	0 / 240
ITN	There is Such a People	Conservatism; Right-wing populism	Right-wing	Slavi Trifonov	4.11	11 / 240
NV	New Time (political party)	Liberalism	Centre	Miroslav Sevelievski	DNP	0 / 240
DDD-DZ	Movement of Democratic Action	Liberal conservatism	Centre-right	Stefan Ivanov	DNP	0 / 240
SBOR	SBOR	Syncretic Politics	Syncretic	Dimitar Iliev	Together (Bulgaria)	0 / 240
DBG	Bulgaria for Citizens Movement	Liberal conservatism	Centre to Centre-right	Jordan Yordanov	DNP	0 / 240
GERB	GERB	Conservatism; Populism	Centre-right	Boyko Borisov	26.9	67 / 240
NDSV	National Movement for Stability and Progress	Liberalism	Centre	Stanimir Ilchev	0.27	0 / 240
SPS "Zashita"	Union of Patriotic Forces "Defense"	Bulgarian nationalism	Right-wing	Petar Beron	DNP	0 / 240
Edinstvo	National Movement "Unity"	Liberal conservatism	Center-right	Nikolay Ivanov	DNP	0 / 240
RZS	Order, Law and Justice	Right-wing populism	Right-wing	Yane Yanev	DNP	0 / 240
ZNS	Agrarian People's Union	Agrarianism	Centre-right	Rumen Yonchev	DNP	0 / 240
BUDD	Bulgarian Union for Direct Democracy	Direct democracy	Syncretic	Georgi Nedelchev	0.10	0 / 240
SEK	Middle European Class	Liberal conservatism	Center-right	Konstantin Bachiyski	PP-DB	1 / 240
"Citizens for the Communities"	Bulgarian Workers-Peasants Party	Communism; Marxism-Leninism	Far-Left	Georgi Georgiev; Yordan Maldzhanski	DNP	0 / 240
"Citizens for the Communities"	Competency, Responsibility, Truth	Euroscepticism; Populism	Syncretic	Svetozar Suev	Out of EU and NATO	0 / 240
"Together for Strong Communities"	Republicans for Bulgaria	Conservative liberalism	Center-right	Tsvetan Tsvetanov	DNP	0 / 240
"Together for Strong Communities"	"Green Union"	Green Politics	Center		DNP	0 / 240
Levitsata!	Stand Up.BG	Social liberalism Social democracy	Center-left	Maya Manolova	2.23	0 / 240
Levitsata!	Alternative for Bulgarian Revival	Social democracy Moderate social conservatism	Center-left	Rumen Petkov	2.23	0 / 240
Levitsata!	ex-BSP faction	Social democracy	Center-left	Kostadin Paskalev; Valeri Zheblyan	2.23	0 / 240
Levitsata!	Movement 21	Social democracy	Center-left	Tatyana Doncheva	2.23	0 / 240
Neutral Bulgaria	Russophiles for the Revival of the Fatherland	Russophilia; National conservatism	Syncretic	Nikolay Malinov	0.42	0 / 240
Neutral Bulgaria	Communist Party of Bulgaria	Communism; Marxism-Leninism	Far-left	Aleksandar Paunov	0.42	0 / 240
Neutral Bulgaria	Bulgarian Communist Party	Communism; Left-wing nationalism	Far-left	Zonka Spasova	0.42	0 / 240
Neutral Bulgaria	Party of the Bulgarian Communists	Communism; Marxism–Leninism	Far-left	Collective leadership	0.42	0 / 240
Neutral Bulgaria	New Force	Bulgarian nationalism	Far-right	Collective leadership	0.42	0 / 240
"Bulgaria of the Regions"	New Bulgaria	Anti-corruption	Center	Ivaylo Simeonov	DNP	0 / 240
"Bulgaria of the Regions"	NPPB	Local politics of Haskovo			DNP	0 / 240
BSP for Bulgaria	Bulgarian Socialist Party	Social democracy Social conservatism	Center-left	Korneliya Ninova	8.93	23 / 240
BSP for Bulgaria	Ecoglasnost	Green politics	Center-left	Emil Georgiev	8.93	23 / 240
BSP for Bulgaria	Political Club "Trakiya"	Southern Bulgarian regionalism Left-wing nationalism	Center-left	Stefan Nachev	8.93	23 / 240
Alternative for the Citizens	Green Party	Green politics	Center-left	Mariya Dragomiretskaya	DNP	0 / 240
Alternative for the Citizens	Bulgarian Left	Democratic socialism	Left-wing	Collective leadership	DNP	0 / 240
Alternative for the Citizens	Unified Social-Democracy	Social-democracy	Center-left	Yordan Gergov	DNP	0 / 240
Alternative for the Citizens	Movement for Social Humanism	Social-democracy	Center-left	Tsevtan Minkyovski	DNP	0 / 240
PP-DB	We Continue the Change	Liberalism; Anti-corruption	Center	Kiril Petkov Assen Vassilev	24.56	63 / 240
PP-DB	Volt Bulgaria	Eurofederalism	Center	Nastimir Ananiev	24.56	63 / 240
PP-DB	Yes, Bulgaria!	Economic liberalism Anti-corruption	Center-right	Hristo Ivanov	24.56	63 / 240
PP-DB	Democrats for a Strong Bulgaria	Liberal conservatism Atlanticism	Center-right	Atanas Atanasov	24.56	63 / 240
PP-DB	Green Movement	Green politics Green liberalism	Centrist	Vladislav Panev	24.56	63 / 240

=== Local parties & coalitions ===
Name		Location	Ideology	
Name		Location	Ideology	Leader(s)
Unification for Plovdiv	Bulgarian Cause	Plovdiv	Local politics	Georgi Tityukov
Unification for Plovdiv	New Leaders	Plovdiv	Local politics Direct democracy	Ivanka Miteva
RzSR	Development for Septemvri and the Region	Septemvri	Local politics	Radoslav Lyutakov
SzP	Union for Plovdiv	Plovdiv	Local politics Liberal conservatism	Yevelin Paraskov; Veselin Kozarev
BzR	Future of the Motherland	Stara Zagora	Local politics	Stanislav Popov
DzPP	Movement for the Prosperity of Pernik	Pernik	Local politics	Stanislav Vladimirov
SS	Spasi Sofia	Sofia	Local politics Anti-corruption	Boris Bonev
MORE	More	Nesebar	Local politics Rural interests	Peycho Kolev

== Mayorship of Sofia ==
The 2023 Sofia mayoral election took place as part of Bulgaria’s local elections, with the first round held on 29 October 2023 and a runoff on 5 November 2023. Voters in Bulgaria’s capital elected a new mayor to succeed long-serving incumbent Yordanka Fandakova from GERB who had held the office since 2009.

The main candidates were

- Vasil Terziev — candidate of the reformist coalition We Continue the Change – Democratic Bulgaria – Save Sofia. He is a tech entrepreneur and co-founder of software company Telerik.
- Vanya Grigorova — backed by the Bulgarian Socialist Party (BSP) and allied left-wing parties.
- Anton Hekimyan — candidate from the center-right GERB–SDS coalition (eliminated in the first round).

Other candidates included nominees from Revival, Blue Sofia, and ITN, but none advanced to the runoff.

Opinion polls for Mayor of Sofia

Polling firm	Fieldwork date	Sample	Vasil Terziev			Anton Hekimyan		Dean Nikolov	Vanya Grigorova		Vili Lilkov	Others	None of the above	Lead		
Polling firm	Fieldwork date	Sample	PP	DB	SS	GERB	SDS	Revival	BSP	Levitsata!	Vili Lilkov	Others	None of the above	Lead		
ЕСТАТ	29.09-9.10 2023	800	27.8			18.7			20.6		6.4	Others	None of the above			7.2
CAM	21–25 Jul 2023	1,212	33.4			22.7		12.0	10.6		4.8	Others	None of the above	7.9	2.7	10.7

No candidate secured an outright majority in the first round, leading to a runoff between the top two finishers. In the runoff on 5 November, Vasil Terziev won with 48.2 % of the vote, narrowly defeating Vanya Grigorova, who received 46.9 %. The victory margin was one of the tightest in recent Sofia elections. A small share of voters (about 4.9 %) chose the “I do not support anyone” option.

Terziev’s win marked a political shift in Sofia, ending nearly two decades of dominance by the conservative GERB party in the capital.

== Results ==
=== First round ===
According to Central Election Commission the number of people who voted on 29 October totaled 2,713,979 or 44.94% of eligible voters. The turnout was 49.76% in the 2019 local elections. The invalid ballots in the 29 October, 2023 elections totaled over half a million, including 412,711 ballots for municipal councilors, 94,195 for municipality mayor (down from 128,204 in 2019) and 34,235 for mayoralty mayor.

In general, GERB had the strongest showing throughout the country, although the party failed to make it to the second round in the capital.

=== Second round ===
Overall, GERB won 11 regional towns, PP–DB won four, and the Bulgarian Socialist party won three. Of the largest four cities, PP-DB won in the capital (Sofia) and Varna while GERB won in Plovdiv and Burgas.

==== Sofia ====
Popular vote (Sofia City Council)
We Continue the Change–Democratic Bulgaria	34.3%
GERB-UDF	19.9%
Bulgarian Socialist Party-Levitsata!	13.9%
Revival	11.1%
Blue Sofia-KOD	4.7%
ITN	4.5%
VMRO	1.8%
Others	9.8%

Popular vote (Mayor of Sofia) - First Round
Vasil Terziev	31.8%
Vanya Grigorova	21.6%
Anton Hekimyan	17.8%
Dean Nikolov	7.7%
Vili Lilkov	5.7%
Ivaylo Valchev	3.2%
Radostin Vassilev	2.5%
Others	9.7%

Popular vote (Mayor of Sofia) - Second Round
Vasil Terziev	48.2%
Vanya Grigorova	46.9%
Against all	4.9%
