= 2023 Sofia mayoral election =

Mayoral election in Sofia

2023 Sofia mayoral elections
- 29 October 2023 (first round); 5 November 2023 (runoff)
- Turnout: 36.04% (first round) ▼6.78 pp 34.64% (runoff) ▼5.38 pp

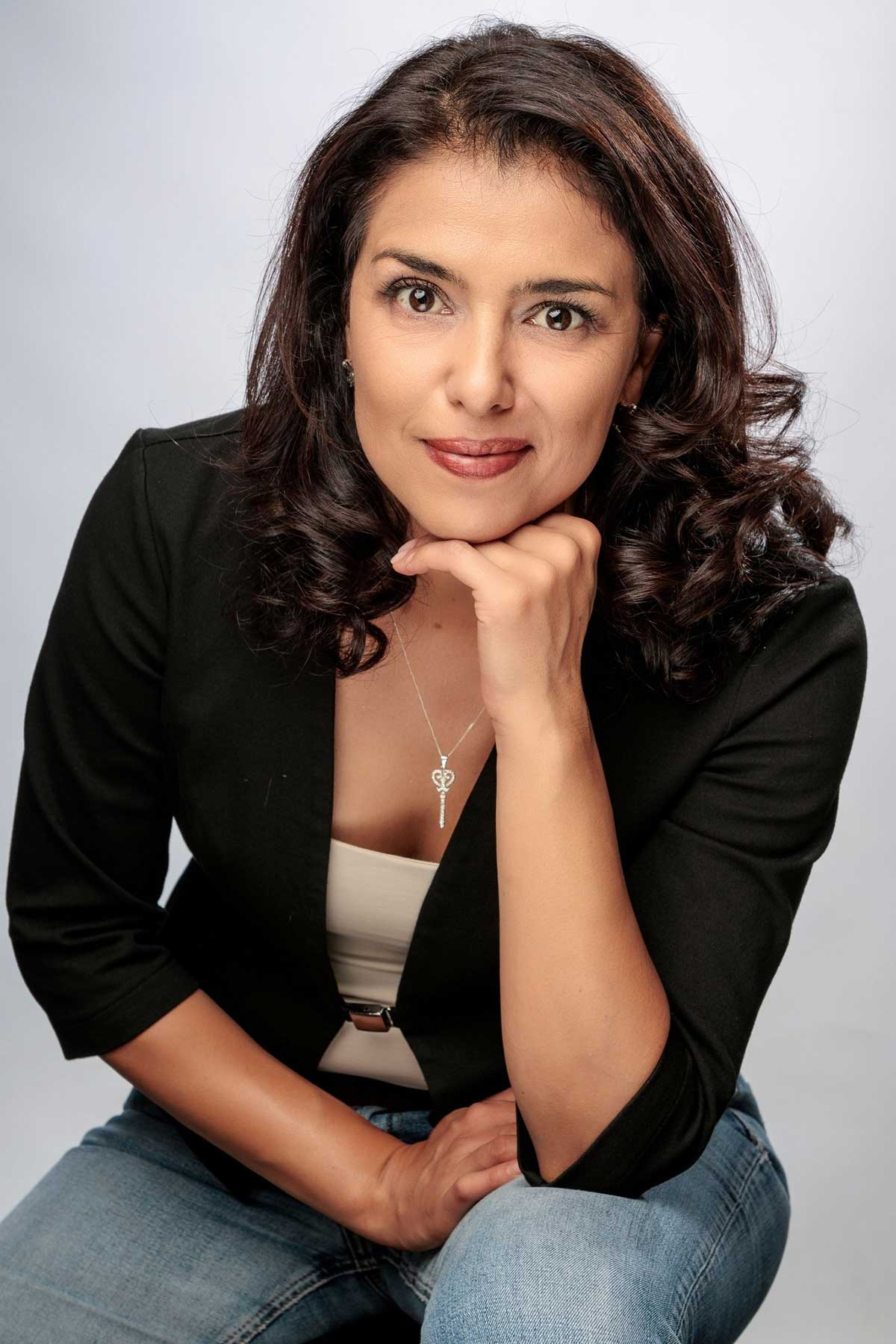

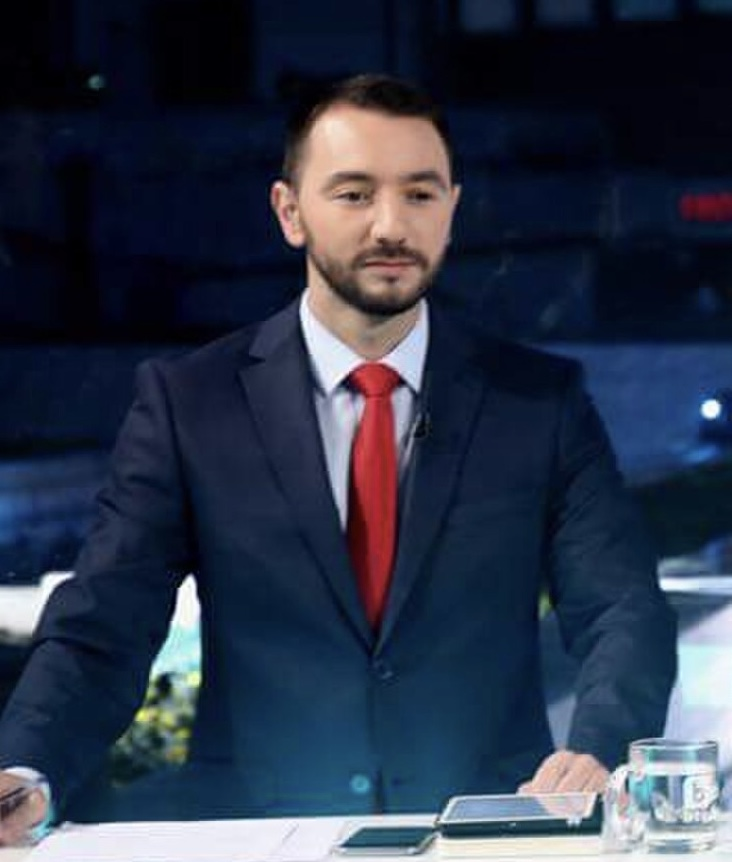

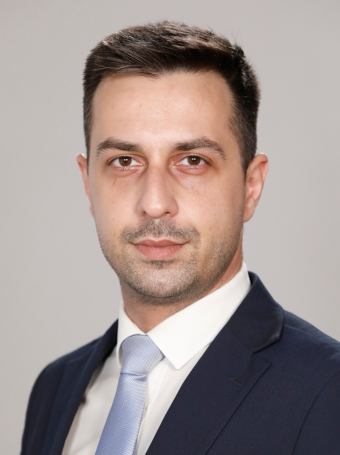

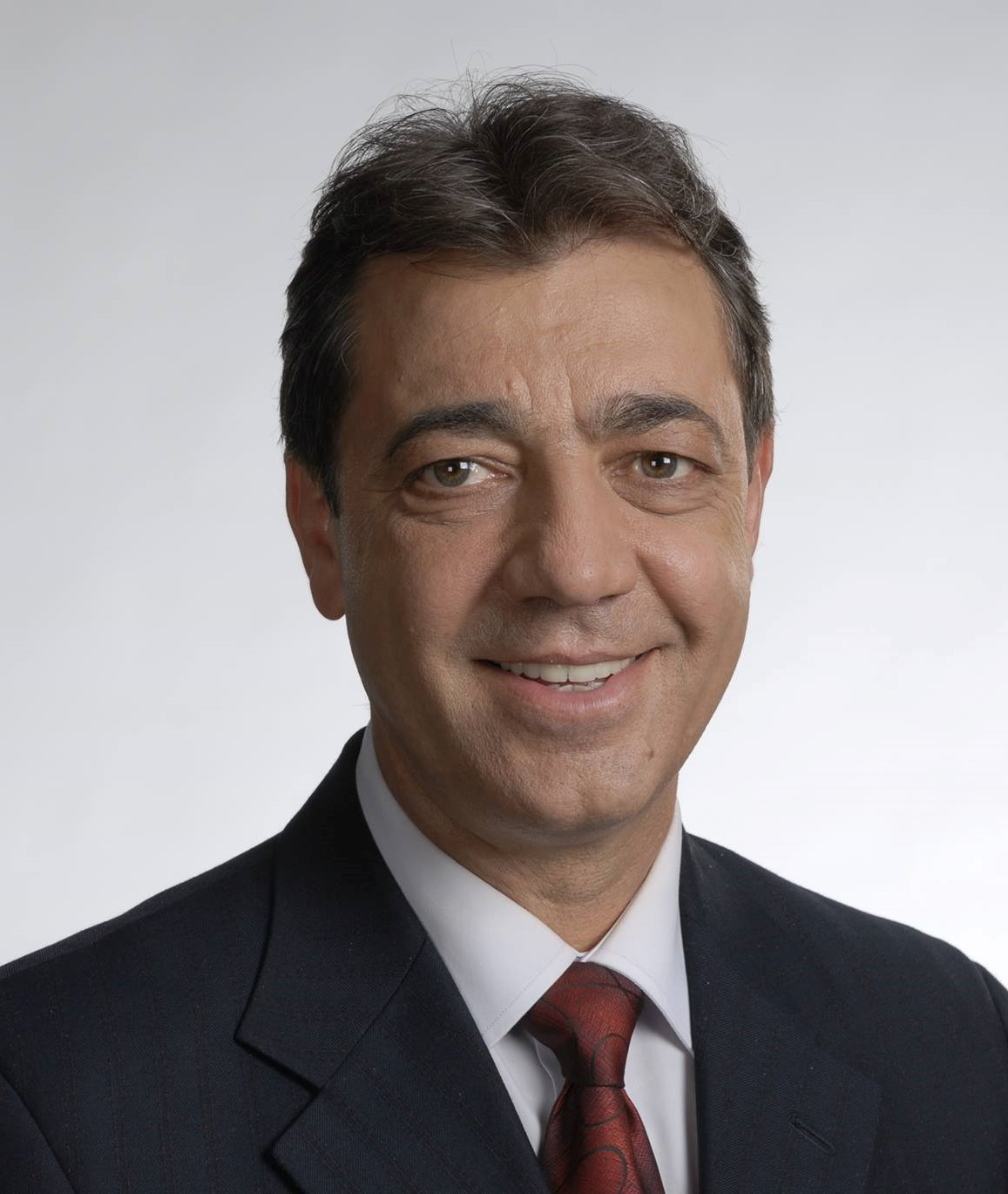

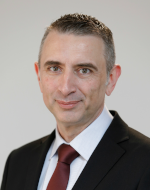
Candidate	Vasil Terziev	Vanya Grigorova	Anton Hekimyan
Party	PP–DB—SS	BSPzB	GERB—SDS
First round	119,121; 31.80%	80,875; 21.59%	66,792; 17.83%
Runoff	175,044; 48.20%	170,258; 46.89%	Eliminated (Note: Refused to endorse a candidate initially, then endorsed Terziev)
Candidate	Deyan Nikolov	Vili Lilkov	Ivaylo Vulchev
Party	Revival	Blue Sofia	ITN
First round	29,052; 7.76%	21,326; 5.69%	11,861; 3.17%
Runoff	Eliminated	Eliminated	Eliminated (Note: Endorsed Grigorova)
Mayor before election
Yordanka Fandakova
GERB
Elected mayor
Vasil Terziev
PP-DB—Spasi Sofia

The 2023 Sofia mayoral election was held on 29 October 2023, during the 2023 Bulgarian local elections, to elect the next mayor of Sofia.

== Background ==
For the past 14 years (since 2009), the mayor of Sofia has been Yordanka Fandakova, from the party GERB.

Fandakova served four terms, including three full terms, as mayor of Sofia, becoming the first woman to serve in the position and the longest serving mayor of Sofia.

During Fandakova's time in office, the public transportation system has been expanded, in particular with a number of projects aimed at expanding the Sofia metro. Additionally, Fandakova has taken credit for initiating the project "Green Sofia", which is supposed to support initiatives meant to make Sofia more environmentally friendly.

However, Fandakova's tenure as mayor has also come under scrutiny. Fandakova has been accused of allowing corruption in new construction projects. Specifically, critics of Fandakova have identified the construction of the new metro lines as a source of corruption, often leading to inefficient results.

Calls for Fandakova to resign increased in the period between 2018 and 2019, with her vice-mayor, Evgeni Krusev, resigning his position due to mismanagement of repairs in the Grafa Street district. However, Fandakova herself refused to resign, and sought a third term as Mayor in the 2019 Sofia Mayoral Elections. Fandakova faced a challenge in the 2019 elections, from BSP-supported independent, Maya Manolova, VMRO candidate Dzhambanski and leader of the civic organisation Spasi Sofia, Boris Bonev, as well as other candidates. According to some polls, Maya Manolova was even in the lead, ahead of the incumbent. Fandakova ended up narrowly defeating Manalova in the second round, although Manolova has claimed that election fraud took place, and called for a recount.

== Candidates ==
Every Bulgarian citizen older than 18 and who is registered in Sofia City is allowed to run for the position of mayor of Sofia.

=== Announced and Registered ===
Candidate name, age, political party		Political offices	Endorsing parties	Campaign announcement
Vasil Terziev (48); PP–DB	Vasil Terziev	Entrepreneur, founder of the Software Company, Telerik	PP; VOLT; DB; Yes, Bulgaria!; DSB; ZD; Spasi Sofia; Team for Sofia (Note: Technically a civic organisation, rather than a political party, however has endorsed Vasil Terziev.)	27 June 2023
Deyan Nikolov (36); Revival		Member of Bulgarian National Assembly (2021–present)	Revival	4 July 2023
Vili Lilkov (71); Independent	Vili Lilkov	Member of the 43d Bulgarian National Assembly from the Reformist Bloc	Coalition "Blue Sofia"; Conservative Union of the Right (KOD); BZNS-Sofia (Note: While the BZNS regional branch has declared its support for Vili Lilkov, and has been included in the coalition "Blue Sofia", the national branch of the BZNS has not supported this and has said that an official decision as to the endorsement of the BZNS will come in September.); Movement for Democratic Action; NDSV; Bulgarian Democratic Forum (BDF); Bulgarian New Democracy (BND); Union of Free Democrats (SSD)	16 July 2023
Vanya Grigorova (48); Independent		Economist advisor the chairman of the trade union "Podkrepa"	BSP for Bulgaria; BSP; Ecoglasnost; Trakiya "Political Club"; Levitsata! (Note: Officially endorsed by the chairman of Levitsata! (Kostadin Paskalev), but it is not yet certain if all constituent parties shall support her nomination.); Movement 21; ABV; Stand Up.BG (Note: ISBG technically endorsed Nikola Vaptsarov for mayor in July and have not withdrawn his candidacy, however, they are a constituent memember of Levitsata!, who signed in support of Grigorova's candidacy); Neutral Bulgaria; Communist Party of Bulgaria; BCP; RVO; New Force; Alternative for Bulgarian Citizens; Bulgarian Left; Green Party of Bulgaria; Unified Social Democratic Party; Movement for Social Humanism; ATAKA; New Dawn; European Security and Integration; Union for the Fatherland; Agrarian Union "Aleksandar Stamboliyski"; Socialist Party "Bulgarian Way"	25 August 2023
Radostin Vasilev (41); Independent	Radostin Vasilev	Member of the Bulgarian National Assembly (2021-2024)	Strong Bulgaria	5th September 2023
Mariya Koleva (65); Pravoto		Leader of Pravoto (2019–present)	Pravoto	6 September 2023
Karlos Kontrera (39); VMRO		Member of the Sofia City Council (2015-present)	VMRO	17th September 2023
Alexander Tomov (72); BSDE		Member of the 7th Grand National Assembly (1990-1991); Member of the 38th and 40th National Assembly (1994-2001); Leader of the Bulgarian Social Democratic Party "Euro-Left" (2003-)	BSDE	17 September 2023
Krasimir Stoychev (71); Independent		Owner of the mobile phone operator "Citron" (1992-1997); Consultant for the development of Green Energy in Bulgaria	Party of the Greens; Civic Platform "Power to the People"	20 September 2023
Simeon Ananiev (71); Independent		Acting head of the "Bulgarian Railroad Association" (2006-2010); Chairman of the "Green Transport" Organization	Moralitiy, Initiative, Responsibility (MIR)	19 September 2023
Ivaylo Valchev (54); ITN		Member of the Bulgarian National Assembly (2022-present)	ITN	21st September 2023
Anton Hekimyan (42); Independent		Director of the BTV news and sports section (2020-2023)	GERB; SDS	21 September 2023
Violeta Komitova (69); Bulgarian Rise		Minister of Regional Development in the First and Second Yanev Government (2021); Member of the 48th National Assembly (2022-2023)	Bulgarian Rise	27 September 2023
Svetoslav Vitkov (69); People's Voice		Lead vocalist of the Punk Rock group Hipodil (1990-1999); Leader of People's Voice (2013-)	People's Voice	27 September 2023
Asen Angelov (48); Independent		Acting Head of the Bulgarian Employment Agency (2005-2010); Administrative Secretary of the government owned "Agrarian Fund" (2013-2015)	SBOR	28 September 2023
Mazhd Algafari (59); Independent		Journalist	Coalition "Citizens for the Communities"; Bulgarian Peasants-Workers Party; Competency, Responsibility, Truth	28 September 2023
Petar Klisarov (58); Direct Democracy		Leader of the party "Direct Democracy" (2014–)	Direct Democracy	28 September 2023
Kamen Dyulgerov (47); Independent		Businessman	Bulgarian Voice	28 September 2023
Emil Atanasov; BSD		Actor; Founder and Chairman of the "Professional Syndicate of Bulgarian Actors" (2016-)	Bulgarian Social-Democrats	28 September 2023
Georgi Nedelchev; BUDD		Leader of the party "Bulgarian Union for Direct Democracy" (2015-)	Bulgarian Union for Direct Democracy	28 September 2023
Kalin Krulev; ONB		Former candidate for the party NFSB (2021); Lead candidate for ONB in Lovech and Sofia (2022-2023)	Society for a New Bulgaria	28 September 2023
Teodor Dechev (64); BSDP		Deputy Minister of Labour and Social Affairs in the Kostov Government (1997-2001); Chief Editor of the newspaper "Svoboda" (2012-2013)	Bulgarian Social Democratic Party	2 October 2023

=== Registration denied ===
The following candidates were not registered as candidates for the Sofia Mayoral Election, despite announcing their intention to participate in it.

- Hristo Popov, anti-vaccine activist who announced his intention to participate in the Sofia Mayoral Elections as an independent candidate. Registration denied by the Oblast Electoral Commission (OEC).
- Atanas Stefanov, subdeacon, famous for his protest against Ukrainian President Volodymyr Zelensky and removing the Ukrainian flag, who announced his intention to participate in the Sofia Mayoral Elections as an independent candidate. Registration denied by the Oblast Electoral Commission (OEC).

=== Withdrawn ===
The following candidates withdrew from the race from the Sofia Mayoral Election before the registration date.

- Nikola Vaptsarov, announced his candidacy on 20 July, endorsed by Stand Up.BG, implicitly endorsed Vanya Grigorova and did not submit his candidacy.

=== Declined ===
The following individuals were speculated to have been interested in running within the Sofia Mayoral election, but eventually decided not to run.

==== GERB ====
- Yordanka Fandakova, incumbent mayor from GERB since 2011.
- Rosen Zhelyazkov, incumbent Chairman of the 48th Bulgarian National Assembly.
- Georgi Georgiev, current chairman of the Sofia City Council. Was speculated to be the presumptive GERB nominee, however ended up endorsing Anton Hekimyan.
- Nikolai Gabrovski, neurosurgeon and PM candidate for GERB in 2022. Has been speculated as a potential nomination for GERB, but was not selected as the eventual GERB candidate

==== PP-DB ====
- Boris Bonev leader of the political party Spasi Sofia and member of the Sofia City Council. Endorsed Vasil Terziev.
- Lena Borislavova, speaker of former Prime Minister Kiril Petkov.

==== BSPzB ====
- Ivan Takov, leader of the Sofia city branch of the BSP, nominated by local chapters of BSP-Sofia for mayor. Endorsed Vanya Grigorova.
- Maya Manolova, leader of the political party Stand Up.BG and BSP supported candidate in the 2019 Sofia Mayoral election. Declined to participate in the 2023 Sofia Mayoral Election and instead endorsed a "unity left candidate".

==== Other ====
- Ivan Shishkov, former Caretaker Minister of Regional Development in the Donev I & Donev II. Served as deputy minister of Regional Development in the Stefan Yanev caretaker cabinets. Professionally is an architect. Has expressed interest in running for Mayor of Sofia, however did not end up filing for registration.

== Election campaign ==
=== Vasil Terziev ===
Vasil Terziev was announced as the joint candidate of PPDB, Spasi Sofia and Team for Sofia on 27 June 2023.

=== Asen Angelov ===
The candidate of the party "SBOR", Asen Angelov, gained some notoriety due to his campaigns use of unconventional campaign strategies: such as internet memes or the use of door-to-door campaigning rather than mass rallies. The campaign similarly gained some attention due to its intense spending on advertisements (potentially up to 130,000 Leva), while still receiving a rather disappointing result.

== Opinion polls ==
Fieldwork date	Polling firm	Terziev	Hekimyan	Nikolov	Grigorova	Lilkov	Valchev	Vaptsarov	Komitova	Kontrera	Undecided	Lead
21–24 Oct 2023	Alpha Research	29.8%	21.1%	10.2%	20.2%	8.3%	3.4%	N/A	1.9%	0.6%	4.5%	8.7%
16–20 Oct 2023	SovaHarris	32.9%	22.9%	13.1%	20.8%	4.0%	3.2%	N/A	1.7%	1.8	1.7%	10.0%
10–17 Oct 2023	Mediana	24.8%	21.4%	13.4%	22.2%	7.2%	5.4%	N/A	1.8	0.6	3.0	2.6%
29 Sept–9 Oct 2023	ESTAT	27.8%	18.7%	4.7%	20.6%	6.4%	2.4%	N/A	N/A	N/A	N/A	7.2%
21- 25 July 2023	Center for Analysis and Marketing	33.4%	22.7%	12%	10.6%	4.8%	N/A	0.8%	N/A	N/A	N/A	10.7%

== Results ==
Candidate	Party	1st Round		2nd Round	
Candidate	Party	Votes	%	Votes	%
Vasil Terziev	PP-DB	119,121	31.80	175,044	48.20
Vanya Grigorova	BSPzB	80,875	21.59	170,258	46.89
Anton Hekimyan	GERB-SDS	66,792	17.83		
Deyan Nikolov	Revival	29,052	7.76		
Vili Lilkov	Blue Sofia	21,356	5.69		
Ivaylo Valchev	ITN	11,861	3.17		
Radostin Vasilev	Independent	9,450	2.52		
Violeta Komitova	BV	4,333	1.16		
Karlos Kontrera	VMRO	3,462	0.92		
Svetoslav Vitkov	GN	2,335	0.62		
Asen Angelov	SBOR	2,320	0.62		
Petar Klisarov	DD	1,850	0.49		
Teodor Dechev	BSDP	1,682	0.45		
Krasimir Stoychev	Zelenite	1,581	0.42		
Mazhd Algafari	CfC	776	0.21		
Mariya Koleva	Pravoto	642	0.17		
Alexander Tomov	BSDE	638	0.17		
Kamen Dyulgerov	BG	580	0.15		
Yemil Atanasov	BSD	563	0.15		
Simeon Ananiev	MIR	452	0.12		
Georgi Nedelchev	BUDD	417	0.11		
Kalin Krulev	ONB	412	0.11		

== See also ==
- 2023 Bulgarian local elections
