= Vili Lilkov =

Bulgarian physicist and politician

- Лили Вилков
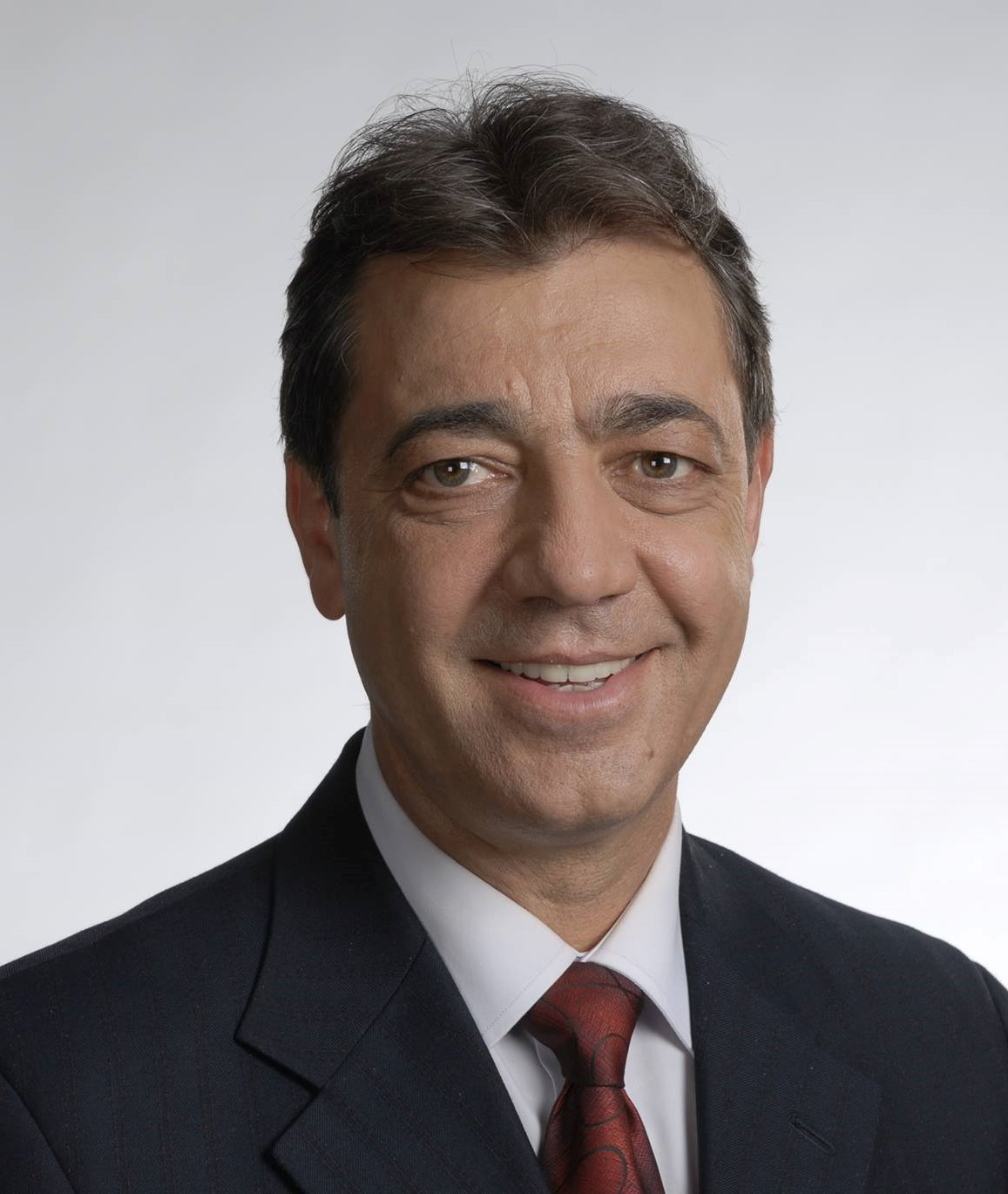
- Lilkov in 2023

Member of the Sofia City Council
- Incumbent
- Assumed office 13 November 2023
- In office 8 November 1999 – 27 October 2014

Member of the National Assembly
- In office 27 October 2014 – 26 January 2017
- Constituency: 25th MMC - Sofia

Personal details
- Born: 6 April 1955 (age 71) Vidin, Bulgaria
- Party: Blue Bulgaria
- Other political affiliations: Union of the Democratic Forces (1994–2004); Democrats for Strong Bulgaria (2004–2017)
- Education: Sofia University (BSc); Sofia University of Mining and Geology (PhD)
- Occupation: physicist, politician

Vili Mladenov Lilkov is a Bulgarian physicist, politician, author, and basketball player. He is the deputy chairman of the Sofia City Council (2023 - 2027) from the "Blue Sofia" coalition. In 2024, he founded the Blue Bulgaria coalition.

He is a professor at the Sofia University of Mining and Geology. Lilkov is also a co-founder of the Democrats for a Strong Bulgaria. He served four terms as a member of the Sofia City Council (1999–2014) and was deputy chairman (2011–2014) representing the Union of Democratic Forces and the Blue Coalition. He was a member of the 43rd National Assembly as part of the Reformist Bloc parliamentary group.

== Early life and education ==
Vili Lilkov graduated from the local High School of physics and mathematics. After winning the selection round at the International Physics Olympiad, he was admitted without any examination to Sofia University in 1973. He graduated with a degree in Engineering Physics and a specialization in Nuclear Physics in 1980.

He would work at the Chemical Plant in Vidin from 1980 to 1983.

== Scientific career ==
He joined the Department of Physics of the Sofia University of Mining and Geology (1984) as an assistant, became a senior assistant (1986), then a chief assistant (1988). He was a part-time PhD student in neutron physics at the Institute of Nuclear Research and Nuclear Energy of the Bulgarian Academy of Sciences under the supervision of prof. Kiril Krejov in 1989–1994. He defended his doctoral thesis on "Spectrometer for polarized neutrons and study of amorphous magnetic bands" in 1994.

He became Associate Professor (1998), then Professor (2011) of Nuclear Physics at the Sofia University of Mining and Geology. Since 1999 he has been Head of the Department of Physics and is currently a lecturer in general physics and atomic and nuclear physics at the university.

In 2018, he defended his dissertation on "Hydration of cements with mineral additives and structure of hardened cement pastes" and received the degree of Doctor of Science.

== Political career ==
In 1994 he became a member of the Union of the Democratic Forces and then chairman of its regional organization in the capital's Triaditsa district. He was a co-founder of the Democrats for a Strong Bulgaria party (2004) and became chairman of its Sofia city organization in 2013.

In 1999 he was elected to the Sofia City Council and served for 4 consecutive terms. In 2011, he was elected Deputy Chairman of the Sofia Cith Council.

At the parliamentary elections in October 2014 he became a member of the XLIII National Assembly as part of the Reformist Bloc parliamentary group.

In September 2015, Lilkov was the candidate of the Reformist Bloc for Mayor of Sofia. He finished second and received 9.62% of the votes but the GERB candidate Yordanka Fandakova was still re-elected as mayor in the first round of the election by reaching a majority result of 60.17%.

In 2021, he joined the initiative committee that nominated Anastas Gerdzhikov for President of Bulgaria.

On 15 July 2023, an initiative committee nominated Lilkov for Mayors of Sofia. He went on to accept the invitation and join the race. His candidacy heavily opposed PP-DB candidate Vasil Terziev, whose controversial family background was criticized by Lilkov. He also declared himself in opposition to the governing model of GERB, the party that had been in charge of Sofia for the past 18 years. He also claimed to be the only right wing candidate in the race. He received the full support of the Conservative Union of the Right party, led by Petar Moskov. Together, they launched the "Blue Sofia" project calling, for the support of other right wing parties like the Union of the Democratic Forces and Democrats for Strong Bulgaria. The first decided to remain a part of the local coalition GERB-SDS and so did the second by remaining a member of Democratic Bulgaria.

Lilkov ended up fifth in the election with 21,326 votes, which represents 5.69% of the total votes cast. He refused to endorse a candidate for the second round of the election between Vasil Terziev and Vanya Grigorova. Nevertheless, his result granted him and his party 3 seats at the Sofia City Council.

== Books ==
Lilkov has thoroughly researched archival documents relating to Bulgaria's recent past. He was author or co-author of the following books:

- Former People (2017)
- The Ruined Bulgaria (2019)
- Valor and Punishment (2021)
- The Economic Absurdities of Bulgarian Communism (2022)
- Our People (2023)
