= Mihail Belchev =

Bulgarian singer, songwriter and poet (1946–2026)

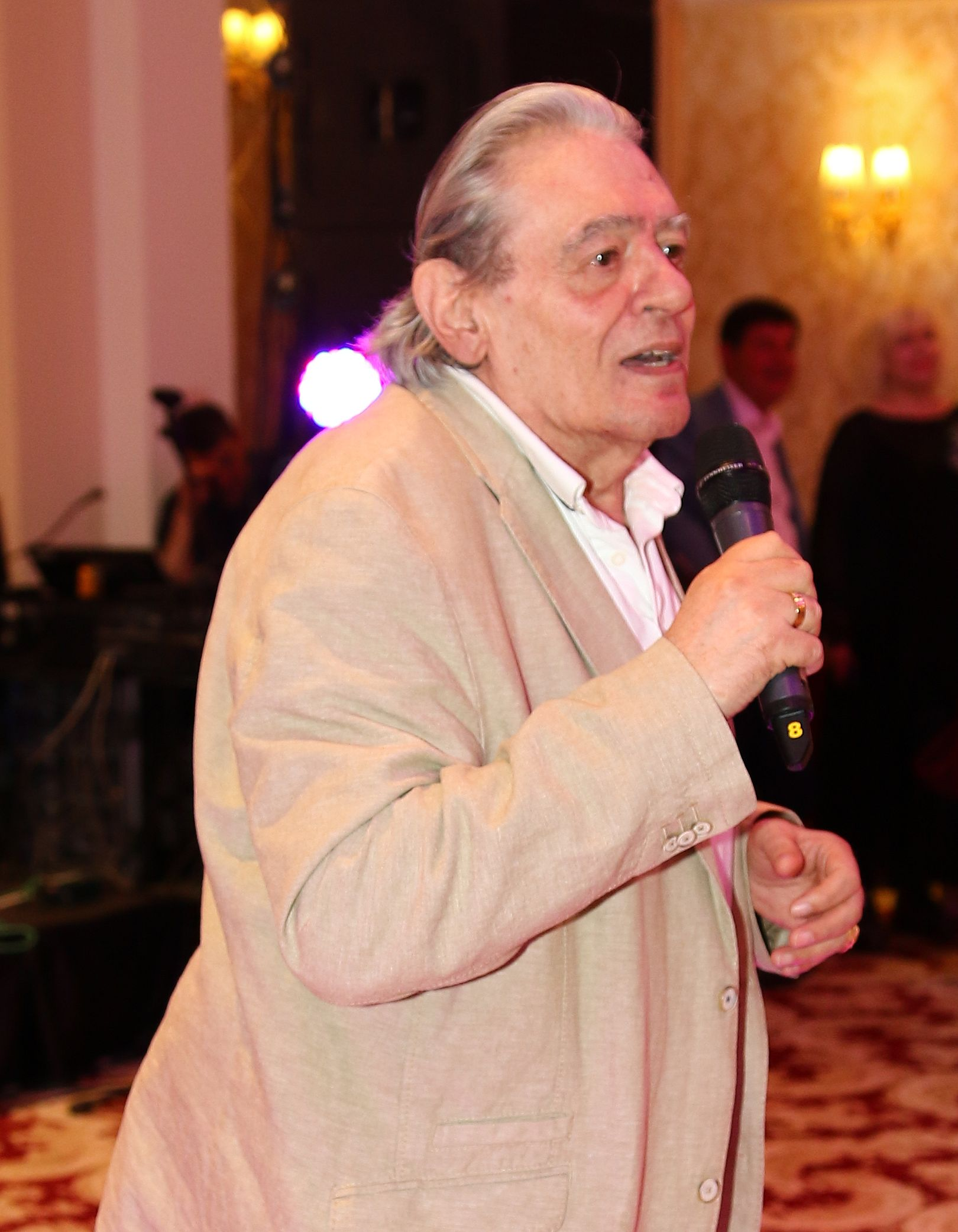
- Belchev in 2019

Background information
- Born: 13 August 1946; Sofia, Bulgaria
- Died: 6 April 2026 (aged 79) Sofia, Bulgaria
- Genres: Pop
- Occupations: Singer; songwriter; poet; director

Mihail Ivanov Belchev (Bulgarian: Михаил Иванов Белчев; 13 August 1946 – 6 April 2026) was a Bulgarian singer, songwriter, poet and director.

== Life and career ==
Mihail Belchev was born in Sofia, Bulgaria on 13 August 1946. He studied for four years at High Mining and Geological Institute in Sofia. He also studied at Saint Petersburg State Theatre Arts Academy of Theatre Arts, where he specialized in television directing.

He wrote either the music or the lyrics, and sometimes both, for songs that have become eternal Bulgarian hits (The Boulevard, At the First Roosters, In 10 Years, I will continue to sing, Not everything is Money, My Friend, and many others).

Belchev was the author of music for theater productions and films. He is also the author of several poetry collections.

He was a two-time winner of the Grand Prix of the Golden Orpheus Festival. He received first prizes at the festival for his songs in 1984, 1990, 1998. In 1996 he also received a prize for his entire career. First winner of the national literary award "Georgi Dzhagarov" (2004). Honorary citizen of Sofia (2004). Holder of the Order of Saints Cyril and Methodius with a necklace (2010), and Order of Stara Planina (2018).

Belchev died in Sofia on 6 April 2026, at the age of 79.

== Discography ==
=== Albums ===
- 1976 Михаил Белчев (Mihail Belchev), producer: Balkanton
- 1977 Двойник (Dvoinik), producer: Balkanton
- 1990 Преквалификация (Retraining), producer: Balkanton
- 1994 Човек за прегръщане; songs based on poems by Mihail Belchev, Cassette, producer: Mega Music
- 1996 Късна любов (Late Love), CD, producer: Mega Music
- 2000 Мила моя (My Dear), CD, producer: Mega Music
- 2004 Булевардът (The Boulevard), CD, producer: Not On Label
- 2008 Прераждане (Rebirth), CD, producer: Gaberoff
- 2009 Хитове (Hits), 2 CD, producer: Stefkos Music, SM0902121
