= Republicans for Bulgaria =

Republicans for Bulgaria Републиканци за България
- Leader: Tsvetan Tsvetanov
- Founder: Tsvetan Tsvetanov
- Founded: 27 October 2020
- Split from: GERB
- Headquarters: Sofia
- Membership (2020): 5,717
- Ideology: Conservatism; Economic liberalism; Populism; E-democracy; Pro-Europeanism; Atlanticism
- Political position: Centre-right
- National affiliation: Free Voters (2024)
- Colors: Deep Blue
- National Assembly: 0 / 240
- European Parliament: 0 / 17

Website
- republikanci.bg

Republicans for Bulgaria (Bulgarian: Републиканци за България, romanized: Republikantsi za Balgariya) is a Bulgarian political party formed as a split from GERB by Tsvetan Tsvetanov, formerly the second most senior official in the ruling GERB party, after he was demoted from his positions by GERB leader and Bulgarian Prime Minister Boyko Borisov. The party's abbreviation (RB) is an allusion to the defunct rightist Reformist Bloc coalition.

== Identity ==
The party's core was formed primarily from former GERB, and to a lesser extent - also former DSB and SDS members. It officially positioned itself in the centre-right political space, seeing centrist and rightist parties as potential partners. Despite the party's origins as a splinter movement, its leader has generally refused to rule out a potential future coalition government between his old and new parties.

Tsvetanov stated that the party's goal was to become an "insurmountable factor in Bulgarian politics and a guarantor of the Euro-atlantic direction of development". As such, it became one of the staunchest supporters of Bulgarian membership in NATO.

== Analysis ==
According to Bulgarian financial publication "Kapital", Republicans for Bulgaria had the potential to undermine and siphon support from GERB "from below" due to the fact that Tsvetanov had deep connections with several local GERB chapters he helped build, but also that the party was incapable of attracting leftist, centrist or liberal voters. At the same time, the party could potentially also siphon votes from other rightist parties such as the SDS, primarily from "people with a more staunchly euro-atlantic, Russophobic and rightist sentiment". The publication stated that GERB was primarily supported by people who had "tied their business, professional and personal interests to the party" and Tsvetanov's new party could potentially threaten GERB if it could offer those supporters similar arrangements within itself.

According to Deutsche Welle, Republicans for Bulgaria represented a "GERB-2" and was based not on Euro-atlanticist values, but on promises of power and "personal material prosperity" to its members, as well as the loyalty of many of its cadres to Tsvetanov himself. Nevertheless, the publication noted that the party was "cutting of living flesh" from GERB by taking over not only individual GERB members, but entire leading GERB party structures in major cities and towns in Bulgaria.

GERB official and Deputy Prime Minister Tomislav Donchev acknowledged that party members were being siphoned away to the new Republicans for Bulgaria, but stated that this would not play in the latter's favour, as he opined that "you can take part of the membership, but not from the support base".

== Election results ==
At its formation, the party's program stated that "at minimum" it would enter into Bulgarian parliament with a "pretty large parliamentary group", adding that the party was aiming for a far higher result than the 4% electoral threshold required by Bulgarian law for entry into the National Assembly. Tsvetanov predicted that the party would match GERB's electoral result and gather at least around 500,000 votes in the April 2021 Bulgarian parliamentary election. These goals were met with strong scepticism by Bulgarian sociologists and pollsters, which stated that less than 1% of Bulgarian voters intended to vote for the party in October 2020 and that it had mostly failed at attracting sympathizers outside of its base core.

The party failed to enter the assembly, gaining only 1.31% of the popular vote. In the second election of that year, it fared even worse, managing to obtain only 0.31% of the vote. After the party failed to enter the National Assembly twice during the first two parliamentary elections in 2021, Tsvetanov blamed an "inability to present the [party] program before the people during the campaign" and stated that he would try with "shorter messages".

By September, Tsvetanov announced that his party was looking for coalition partners to contest the 2021 Bulgarian general election together with. Eventually, he reached an agreement with the political formation around Petar Moskov, former DSB member and also an ex-minister in Borisov's former cabinet. The two formed the National Union of the Right, a right-wing, conservative and anti-communist political movement seeking to "go back to the roots of the Bulgarian right". The coalition only gained 0.43% of the popular vote and as such it also failed to enter into the Bulgarian parliament. RzB did not join the Blue Bulgaria alliance but instead formed "Free Voters" with the Green Union and Union of Free Democrats for the October 2024 election.

=== National Assembly ===
Election	Leader	Votes	%	Seats	+/–	Government
Apr 2021	Tsvetan Tsvetanov	42,057	1.30 (#11)	0 / 240	New	Extra-parliamentary
Jul 2021	Tsvetan Tsvetanov	8,546	0.31 (#12)	0 / 240	0	Extra-parliamentary
Nov 2021 (Note: Run as part of the National Union of the Right coalition (KOD, BZNS, BDF and RzB).)	Tsvetan Tsvetanov	11,239	0.42 (#14)	0 / 240	0	Extra-parliamentary
2022	Did not contest			0 / 240	0	Extra-parliamentary
2023	Did not contest			0 / 240	0	Extra-parliamentary
Jun 2024	Did not contest			0 / 240	0	Extra-parliamentary
Oct 2024 (Note: Run as part of the Free Voters coalition (ZS, RzB and SSD).)	Tsvetan Tsvetanov	6,293	0.25 (#15)	0 / 240	0	Extra-parliamentary
