= Blue Bulgaria =

Blue Bulgaria Синя България
- Leader: Petar Moskov; Vili Lilkov
- Founded: 22 April 2024 (nationwide)
- Preceded by: National Union of the Right
- Headquarters: Tsarigradsko shose Blvd, Sofia
- Ideology: National liberalism Conservatism; Anti-communism; Pro-Europeanism
- Political position: Centre-right to right-wing
- Coalition members: See composition
- Colors: Blue
- Slogan: Защото има смисъл ('Because there is a point')
- National Assembly: 0 / 240
- European Parliament: 0 / 17
- Sofia City Council: 3 / 61

Website
- sinyabulgaria.bg

Blue Bulgaria (Bulgarian: Синя България, romanized: Sinya Bŭlgariya) is a right-wing Bulgarian political electoral coalition founded in 2024.

== History ==
In July and November 2021, KOD alongside BDF and others (BZNS and RzB) ran as the National Union of the Right. The coalition got 0.28% and 0.42% in July and November, respectively.

In the 2023 Bulgarian local elections, an electoral coalition called 'Blue Sofia' was formed, nominating Vili Lilkov as their mayoral candidate. The coalition received 5.7% of the vote for mayor, and they received 3 seats in the Sofia City Council.

Following the relative success of the electoral coalition in the local elections, Blue Bulgaria was set up as a nationwide electoral coalition to contest the 2024 European Parliament and National Assembly elections.

== Composition ==
The compositions of the electoral coalition at different elections are as follows:

=== October 2024 and 2026 elections ===
Party	Leader	Ideology
Conservative Union of the Right (KOD)	Petar Moskov	National conservatism Pro-Europeanism
Bulgarian Democratic Forum (BDF)	Jacqueline Toleva	National conservatism
Democratic Action Movement (D3)	Stefan Ivanov	Anti-establishment
Conservative Bulgaria (NFSB)	Boris Yachev	National conservatism
Radical Democratic Party (RPB)	Zahari Petrov	Liberalism
Bulgarian New Democracy (BND)	Borislav Velikov	Liberalism
United Agrarians (OZ)	Vacant	Agrarianism

=== June 2024 election ===
Party	Leader	Ideology
Conservative Union of the Right (KOD)	Petar Moskov	National conservatism Pro-Europeanism
Bulgarian Democratic Forum (BDF)	Jacqueline Toleva	National conservatism
Democratic Action Movement (D3)	Stefan Ivanov	Anti-establishment
National Movement for Stability and Progress (NDSV)	Stanimir Ilchev	Populism; Conservative liberalism
Conservative Bulgaria (NFSB)	Boris Yachev	National conservatism
Bulgaria for Citizens Movement (DBG)	Yordan Yordanov	Liberal conservatism
Radical Democratic Party (RPB)	Zahari Petrov	Liberalism
Bulgarian New Democracy (BND)	Borislav Velikov	Liberalism
Agrarian People's Union (ZNS)	Roumen Yonchev	Agrarianism

== Election results ==
=== National Assembly ===
Election	Leader	Votes	%	Seats	+/–	Government
Jun 2024	Petar Moskov	33,613	1.52 (#9)	0 / 240	New	Extra-parliamentary
Oct 2024	Petar Moskov; Vili Lilkov	26,066	1.07 (#10)	0 / 240	0	Extra-parliamentary
2026	Petar Moskov; Vili Lilkov	18,640	0.53 (#13)	0 / 240	0	Extra-parliamentary

=== European Parliament ===
Election	List leader	Votes	%	Seats	+/–	EP Group
2024	Tsveta Kirilova	24,917	1.24 (#10)	0 / 17	New	–
