= Lena Borislavova =

Bulgarian politician and lawyer

- Лена Бориславова
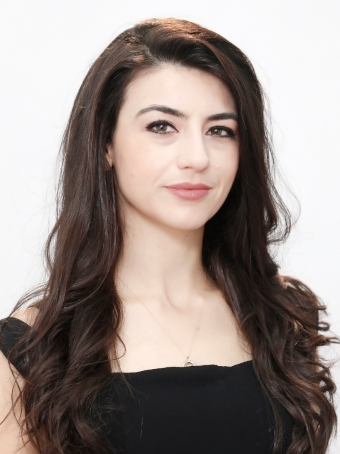
- Official portrait, 2024

Member of the National Assembly
- Incumbent
- Assumed office 19 June 2024
- Constituency: 24th MMC - Sofia

Personal details
- Born: Lena Zdravkova Borislavova; 8 October 1989 (age 36) Sofia, PR Bulgaria
- Party: We Continue the Change (since 2021)
- Other political affiliations: Yes, Bulgaria! (2017-2018)
- Domestic partner: Miroslav Ivanov
- Children: 1
- Education: Sofia University (LL.B, LL.M); Harvard University (LL.M)
- Occupation: Politician; lawyer

Lena Zdravkova Borislavova (Bulgarian: Лена Здравкова Бориславова, born 8 October 1989) is a Bulgarian politician who is a current Member of the National Assembly. A member of the PP party, she previously served as Head of the political cabinet in the Petkov Government, an equivalent position to the chief of staff in other countries.

== Biography ==
Borislavova was born on 8 October 1989 in Sofia. She graduated from the 91st German Language High School "Prof. Konstantin Galabov" in Sofia, and then studied law at Sofia University graduating with honors in 2013.

Borislavova also specialized at Harvard in the United States, where she was a member of the "European Law Students Association at Harvard" and the "Harvard Law and Business Association" during her studies.

=== Law career ===
In 2018 she was included in the prestigious European ranking by Forbes magazine called "30 Under 30", which recognizes the best young leaders, inventors, and entrepreneurs on the continent. She was recognized in the category of "Politics and Law".

Before entering politics she worked in the team of the law firm "Djingov, Gouginski, Kyutchukov & Velichkov", and prior to that, she was with "Georgiev, Todorov & Co". Her work focused on competition law, banking and finance law, commercial law, personal data protection, anti-money laundering measures, and procedural representation. She provided consultation to international clients interested in investing in Bulgaria. She has been a member of the Sofia Bar Association since 2015.

=== Political career ===
In January 2017 she was elected as a member of the National Council of Yes, Bulgaria! She was elected to the XLVII National Assembly from 24 MIR, as a member of We Continue the Change. On 15 December, she resigned from her parliamentary seat to head the political cabinet of Prime Minister Kiril Petkov. She was elected to the XLIX National Assembly, but resigned soon afterwards to focus on leading PP–DB's campaign in Sofia during the 2023 local elections.
