= Sergei Ignatov =

Bulgarian egyptologist

- Сергей Игнатов
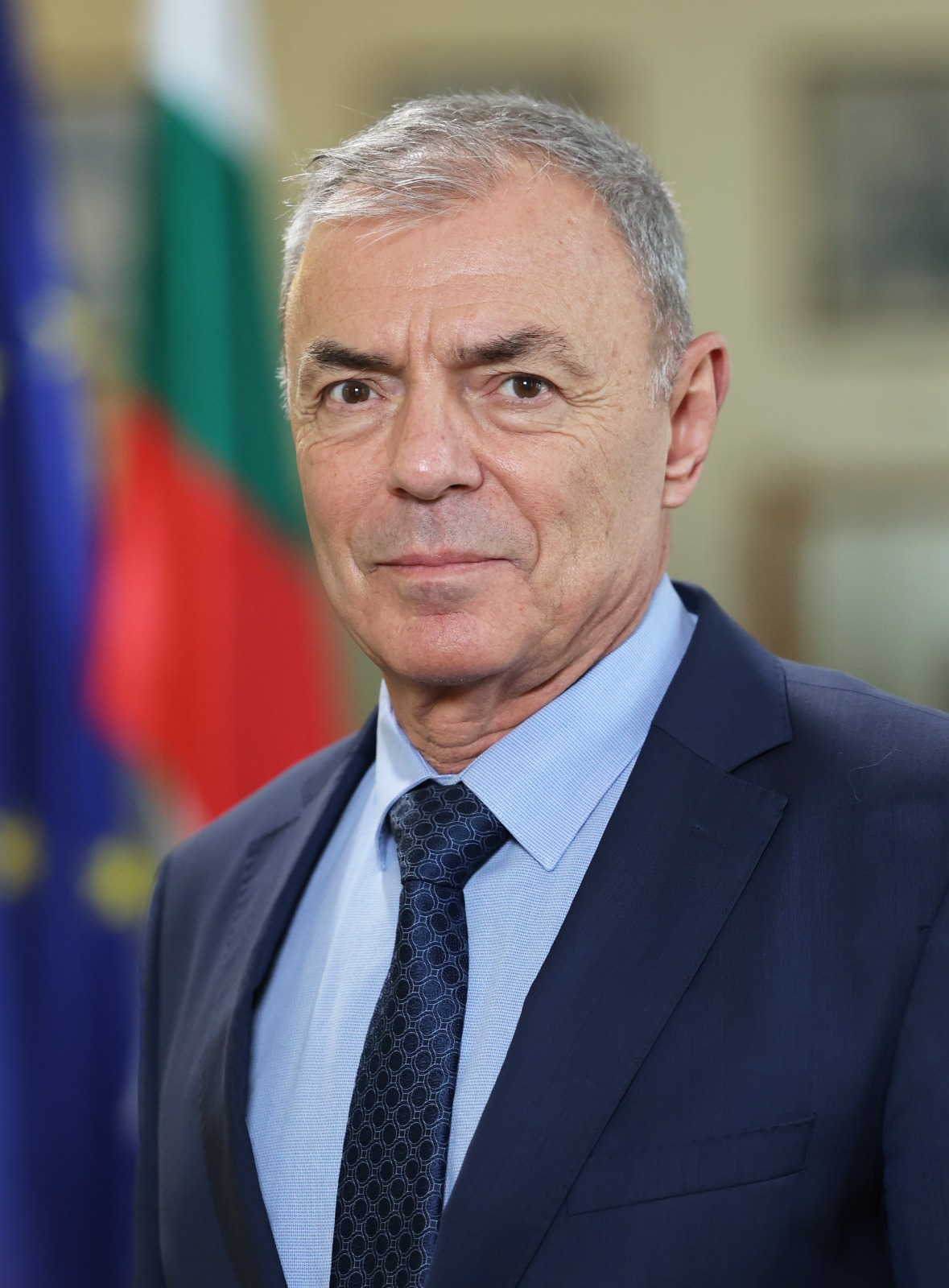
- Official portrait, 2026

Minister of education, youth and science
- In office 19 November 2009 – 28 January 2013
- Prime Minister: Boyko Borisov
- Preceded by: Yordanka Fandakova (minister of education and science)
- Succeeded by: Stefan Vodenicharov

Vice minister of education and science
- In office August 2009 – 19 November 2009
- Prime Minister: Boyko Borisov

Personal details
- Born: 6 August 1960 (age 65) Vidin, Bulgaria
- Party: GERB

Sergei Simeonov Ignatov (Bulgarian: Сергей Симеонов Игнатов; born August 6, 1960) is a Bulgarian Egyptologist and politician, minister of education, youth and science from November 2009 to 28 January 2013, and Minister of education and science in the Gyurov caretaker government since 19 February 2026.

Ignatov was born in Vidin, Bulgaria on 6 August 1960. He graduated with a degree in Egyptology from Leningrad State University in 1985 and later specialized in All Souls College, Oxford. He was lecturer and later associated professor at the Sofia University (1985–1996) and at New Bulgarian University (1994–2009), dean of the bachelor faculty (1998–2002) and chancellor of NBU (2002–2009). Sergei Ignatov is Rector of European Humanities University in Vilnius, Lithuania (since 2018).

In November 2010, Ignatov joined the Bulgarian National Science Fund (BNSF), but following corruption investigation resigned on 4 February 2013. Ignatov is an MEP of political party GERB.
