= Test Studio =

Software test automation tool

- Developer: Telerik
- Stable release: R1 2022(v. 2022.1.215) / February 15, 2022; 4 years ago
- Operating system: Microsoft Windows
- Type: Test automation
- License: Proprietary
- Website: https://www.telerik.com/teststudio

Progress Telerik Test Studio is a Windows-based software test automation tool for web and desktop that supports functional testing, software performance testing, load testing and RESTful API testing developed by Telerik. The tool ships with a plugin for Visual Studio and a standalone app that use the same repositories and file formats. Test Studio supports HTML, AJAX, Silverlight, ASP.NET MVC, JavaScript, WPF, Angular, React, ASP.NET AJAX, ASP.NET Core, and Blazor. Any application that runs on .NET 5, .NET Core, .NET 6 or higher can be automated with Test Studio. Test Studio supports cross-browser testing for Internet Explorer, Firefox, Microsoft Edge, and Chrome.

== Product ==
Test Studio's standalone IDE comes with an integrated visual record and playback test recorder that allows users to create test steps based on mouse-click interaction with the UI elements in the browser. Automated test cases can be further enhanced going into the test script and performing advanced in-code actions. The Visual Studio extension allows users to use Test Studio's automation features within Microsoft Visual Studio.

Functional Testing
The tool provides test automation support for web and desktop applications - Silverlight, WPF, AJAX, HTML, WPF, and MVC, JavaScript calls, dynamic page synchronization, client-side behaviours, as well as support for Visual Studio 2010 and 2012.

RESTful API Testing
Test Studio's API testing allows testing REST protocols. Test Studio supports the creation of verifications against all common API requests based on point and click.

Load Testing
Existing Test Studio functional tests or Fiddler logs can be used to create load tests. Test Studio's load agents are making use of multi-core, hyper-threaded CPUs in order to generate a high user load.

Responsive Web Testing
Test Studio supports testing of responsive web applications to check the UI under test against different form factors.

== Features in brief ==
Some of Test Studio's features include:

- Scriptless test recording and playback
- Cross-browser test execution – Internet Explorer, Firefox, Chrome and Microsoft Edge
- Support for HTML, AJAX, Silverlight, WPF and ASP.NET MVC application testing
- Element abstraction and reuse
- Hybrid element location combining DOM-based attributes and images
- Customizable test results and reports
- Integration with Visual Studio 2010 / 2012, MS Team Foundation Server
- Nunit, MbUnit, XUnit integration
- Sentence-based UI validation
- Continuous integration with Microsoft Build Server, CruiseControl and TeamCity
- Visual debugger
- Test customization in C# and VB.NET
- Exploratory testing
- Manual testing
- Integration with HP Quality Center
- Built-in testing framework
- DOM explorer
- Fiddler web debugger integration
- Automated data-driven testing
- Bug-tracking tools integration

== See also ==
- Test automation
- GUI software testing
- List of GUI testing tools
- List of web testing tools
