= Vasil Terziev =

Bulgarian politician and entrepreneur (born 1978)

- Васил Терзиев
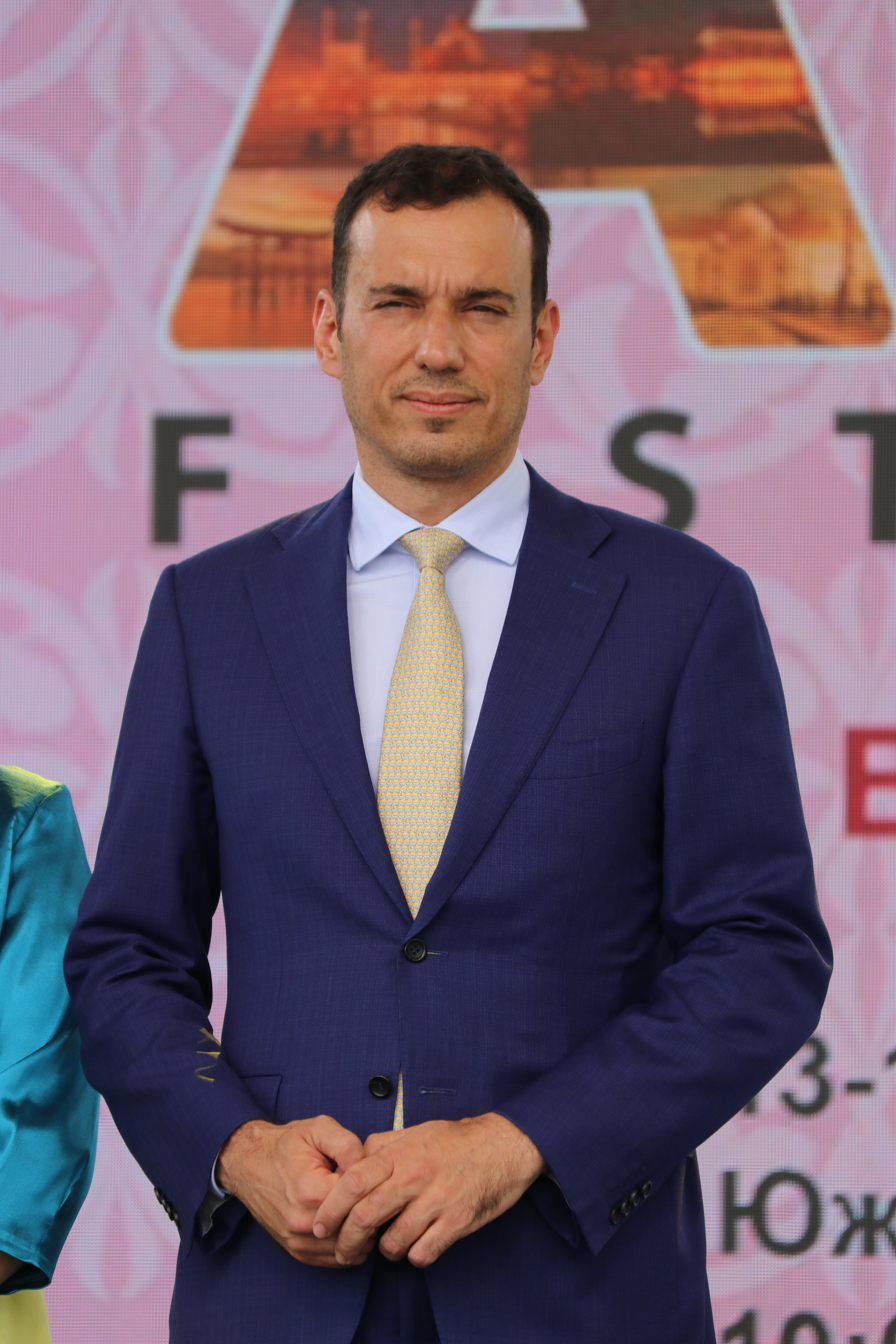
- Terziev in 2026

75th Mayor of Sofia
- Incumbent
- Assumed office 13 November 2023
- Preceded by: Yordanka Fandakova

Personal details
- Born: 9 June 1978 (age 48) Sofia, PR Bulgaria
- Party: We Continue the Change; Democratic Bulgaria; Save Sofia
- Education: American University in Bulgaria
- Occupation: Politician; entrepreneur
- Website: vassilterziev.bg

Vasil Aleksandrov Terziev (Bulgarian: Васил Александров Терзиев; born June 9, 1978) is a Bulgarian politician and businessman who co-founded the multi-million dollar software company Telerik. He is the incumbent Mayor of Sofia after winning the election on 5 November 2023.

== Early life ==
Terziev was born in Sofia on June 9, 1978. His parents were officers of the Committee for State Security, while his grandfather was a Communist partisan who later became a State Security general in charge of military counterintelligence.

He graduated from the First English Language School, after which he obtained a Business Administration degree from the American University in Bulgaria.

== Foundation and establishment of Telerik ==
In 2002, Terziev founded the software company Telerik together with Svetozar Georgiev, Boyko Yaramov and Hristo Kosev, and was its CEO for several years. In its early months, Telerik was involved in website development, but soon moved towards creating its own software products and components. As sales grew in the US market, Telerik attracted the attention of investment firm Summit Partners, which invested in the company in 2008 and helped improve its management. Telerik's business grew rapidly, including through acquisitions in Europe and North America, and in 2013 had 800 employees and 15 offices in various countries around the world.

In 2009, Telerik established Telerik Academy, a center for specialized training of software professionals, which in the following years played an important role for the software sector in Bulgaria. Terziev was a co-founder of the academy.

After several years of rapid sales growth of about 20% per year, in October 2014 the founders of Telerik sold the company to the American software company Progress Software, with an announced value of $262.5 million. That was the largest deal in the Bulgarian technology business as of 2014.

== Political career ==
On 27 June 2023 the electoral alliance of We Continue the Change, Democratic Bulgaria and Spasi Sofia presented Terziev as their candidate for Mayor of Sofia in the 2023 Sofia mayoral election.

Terziev ended up first in the first round of the election on October 29, 2023, winning 31.8% of the votes. He faced Vanya Grigorova on 5 November 2023 at the second round of the election, winning 48.17% of the votes, edging Grigorova by a bit more than 1%, and becoming the new Mayor of Sofia.
