= Vanya Grigorova =

Bulgarian trade unionist and politician (born 1978)

- Ваня Григорова
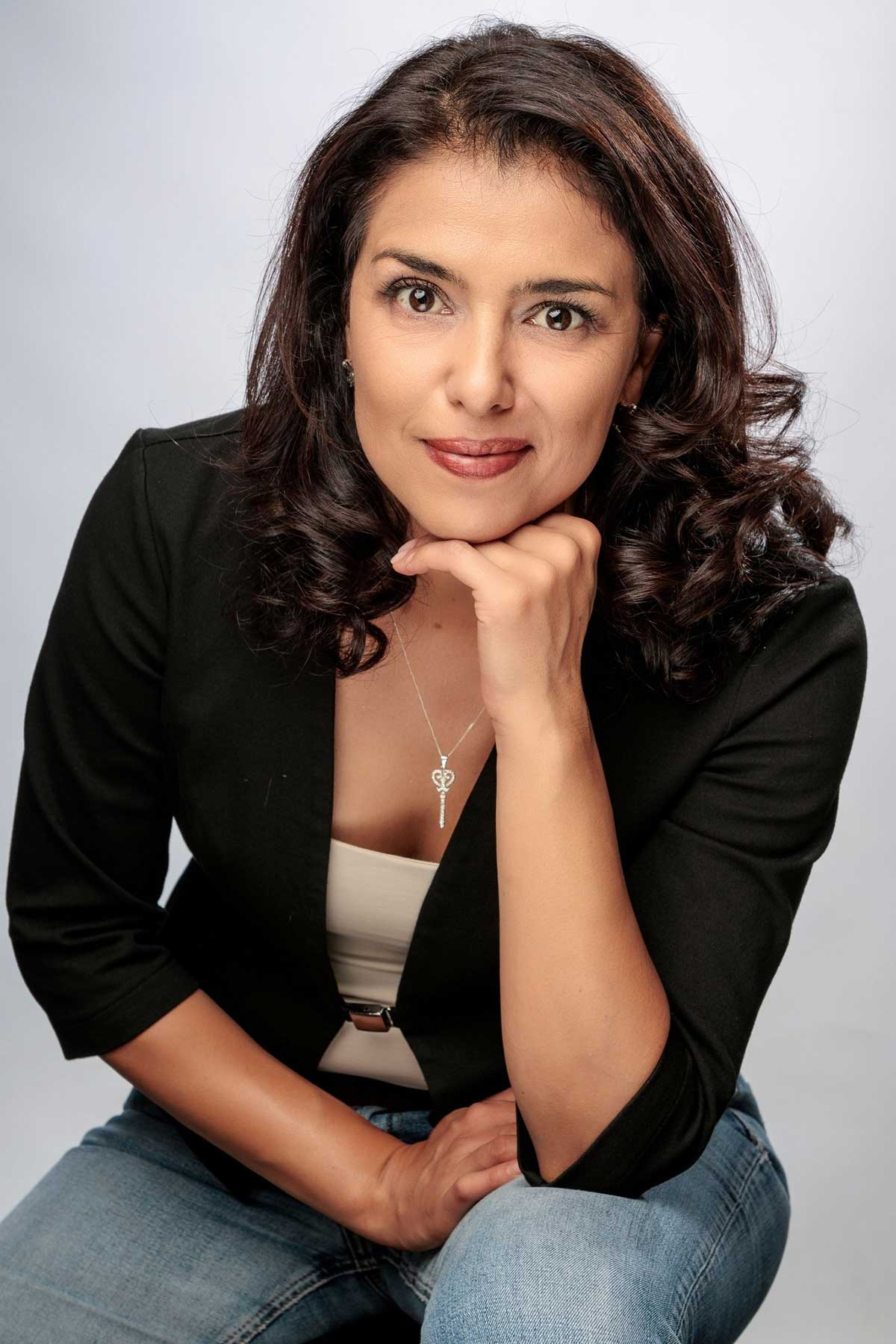

Member of the Sofia City Council
- Incumbent
- Assumed office 13 November 2023

Personal details
- Born: 12 September 1978 (age 48) Sofia, PR Bulgaria
- Party: Solidary Bulgaria (2024–present)
- Other political affiliations: BSP (Note: Grigorova was not officially part of the BSP, but she ran with them in the 2023 Sofia mayoral election elections) (2023)
- Education: University of National and World Economy
- Occupation: Economist; trade unionist; politician
- Website: vanyagrigorova.eu

Vanya Rumenova Grigorova (Bulgarian: Ваня Руменова Григорова; born 12 September 1978) is a Bulgarian economist, trade unionist, labour activist, and politician. She was an economic counselor to the Confederation of Labour Podkrepa from 2015 to 2023. She unsuccessfully ran for Mayor of Sofia in 2023 and is currently a member of the Sofia City Council.

== Early life, education and career ==
Born in Sofia, Vanya Grigorova grew up in the capital's Slatina district. She completed her secondary education at the National High School of Commerce and Banking. She holds a Bachelor's and master's degree from the University of National and World Economy, majoring in marketing.

She used to work as a cleaner in a school and as a worker in a fast food chain. Later on she was a researcher at an online research agency, a market expert at a telecom and a consultant at the Bulgarian wing of the Open Society Foundations NGO, where she was involved in projects aiming the integration of the Roma community.

In 2015, she became an economic advisor to the president of the Confederation of Labour Podkrepa. After the announcement of her candidacy for mayor of the capital in the local elections in 2023, she was relieved of her functions in the union.

== Political career ==
In the 2019 European Parliament elections, she ran for MEP as an independent with the slogan "People before profits". She only received 9320 votes (0.4%), therefore not passing the barrier to the European Parliament.

She ran for Mayor of Sofia in the 2023 Bulgarian local elections, and was nominated by a local coalition, which includes the Bulgarian Socialist Party, The Left!, Attack and other smaller parties. The first round of the election took place on 29 October 2023, and Grigorova ended up second with 21.59% of the votes. Grigorova's result was considered a big surprise, as Anton Hekimyan from the GERB—SDS coalition was expected to finish second as per opinion polls. Her result secured a place for her at the second round of the election, where on 5 November she faced PP–DB candidate Vasil Terziev and lost by a narrow margin.

== Political positions ==
In 2018, Grigorova supported the ratification of the Istanbul Convention in Bulgaria and criticised BSP for their opposition to it in a post on her Facebook page.
