= Telerik =

Bulgarian software company

- Native name: Телерик АД
- Type: Subsidiary
- Industry: Software development
- Founded: 2002
- Founder: Vassil Terziev, Svetozar Georgiev, Boyko Iaramov, Hristo Kosev
- Headquarters: Mladost, Sofia, Bulgaria
- Number of locations: Bulgaria, United States, Australia, Germany, India, Denmark, United Kingdom
- Area served: Worldwide
- Parent: Progress Software
- Website: www.telerik.com

Telerik AD (Bulgarian: Телерик АД) is a Bulgarian company offering software tools for web, mobile, desktop application development, tools and subscription services for cross-platform application development.

Founded in 2002 as a company focused on .NET development tools, Telerik now also sells a platform for web, hybrid and native app development specialising in UI component libraries.

On October 22, 2014, Progress Software announced its acquisition of Telerik. The acquisition was finalized on December 2, 2014.

On March 13, 2023, the Cybersecurity and Infrastructure Security Agency (CISA) published an advisory detailing an exploit that had been found in Telerik's UI for ASP.NET AJAX.

== History ==
Telerik was founded in 2002 by four graduates of American University in Bulgaria and Technical University of Sofia. Initially focused on providing outsourced software development for foreign and Bulgarian companies, the company shifted its direction to the creation of application development tools. Its first product, RAD editor (rapid application development), was a web page editor designed to support the then recently launched Microsoft technology, ASP.NET. The company then expanded its offerings to include user interface (UI) navigation controls, and the Telerik Sitefinity content management system a few years later. Based upon developer interaction, Telerik developed tools targeted to support other .NET technologies, such as ASP.NET AJAX, ASP.NET MVC, WPF, Silverlight and Windows/Windows Phone. Telerik introduced support for HTML5 and JavaScript in 2011 with its Kendo UI product, coinciding with expected industry growth in mobile adoption.

=== Merger & Acquisition ===
The company growth came by way of hiring in Bulgaria, as well as opening its first office abroad in the United States in 2006. By 2008, it had offices in Germany, Britain, Canada, Australia and India. After that the company rapidly expands by means of acquisition below:

- 2008 Germany: Acquired Vanatec GmbH, an enterprise-grade ORM provider
- 2010 USA: Merged with ArtOfTest, adding the Test Studio product
- 2010 Canada: Acquired TeamPulse, via a partnership deal with Imaginet
- 2011 UK and Australia: Expansion
- 2012 USA: Acquired Fiddler, a web debugging proxy
- 2013 Denmark: Acquired EQATEC Analytics, a software analytics suite

By 2013, Telerik had 800 employees in 11 offices, led by co-CEOs Vasil Terziev and Svetozar Georgiev, and Chief Product Officer Aaron Mahimainathan.

On October 22, 2014, Progress Software announced its acquisition of Telerik, for $262.5 million. The acquistion was completed on December 2, 2014.

== Products and technologies ==
Telerik is known for its .NET user interface controls, but through acquisition and invention, expanded to support additional areas of the software development lifecycle:

- DevCraft: A collection of UI controls and widgets with versions for use with applications developed on the .NET platform (ASP.NET AJAX, ASP.NET MVC and WPF), HTML5 (Kendo UI) or through Xamarin for mobile devices.
- Telerik Platform: An integrated group of SaaS suite products that included App Builder, Telerik Analytics and Telerik Back End services that together provide the ability to plan, develop, deploy and measure cross-platform and mobile applications via the cloud. On 10 May 2018, Telerik Platform was retired.
- TeamPulse: An agile development project management tool
- Test Studio: A tool that helps software developers implement testing protocols.
- Sitefinity: A web content management system (CMS), used to create and manage websites accessed via desktop or mobile devices.

=== Open-Source software products ===
For most of its products, Telerik takes a proprietary approach to its development process. However, it also has several products that are free and open source: NativeScript, Kendo UI Core, Data Access, Just Decompile and the “Sitefinity Project Feather” Initiative.

== Federal hacking incident ==
In 2023, it was reported that threat actors had exploited a vulnerability in the Telerik UI for ASP.NET AJAX in a US federal agency's web server. The vulnerability allowed the actors to remotely execute code on specific builds of the UI. The security flaw (CVE-2019-18935) was first disclosed in December 2019, and the activity was determined to have happened between November 2022 and January 2023.
