= Yordanka Fandakova =

Mayor of Sofia from 2009 to 2023

- Йорданка Фандъкова
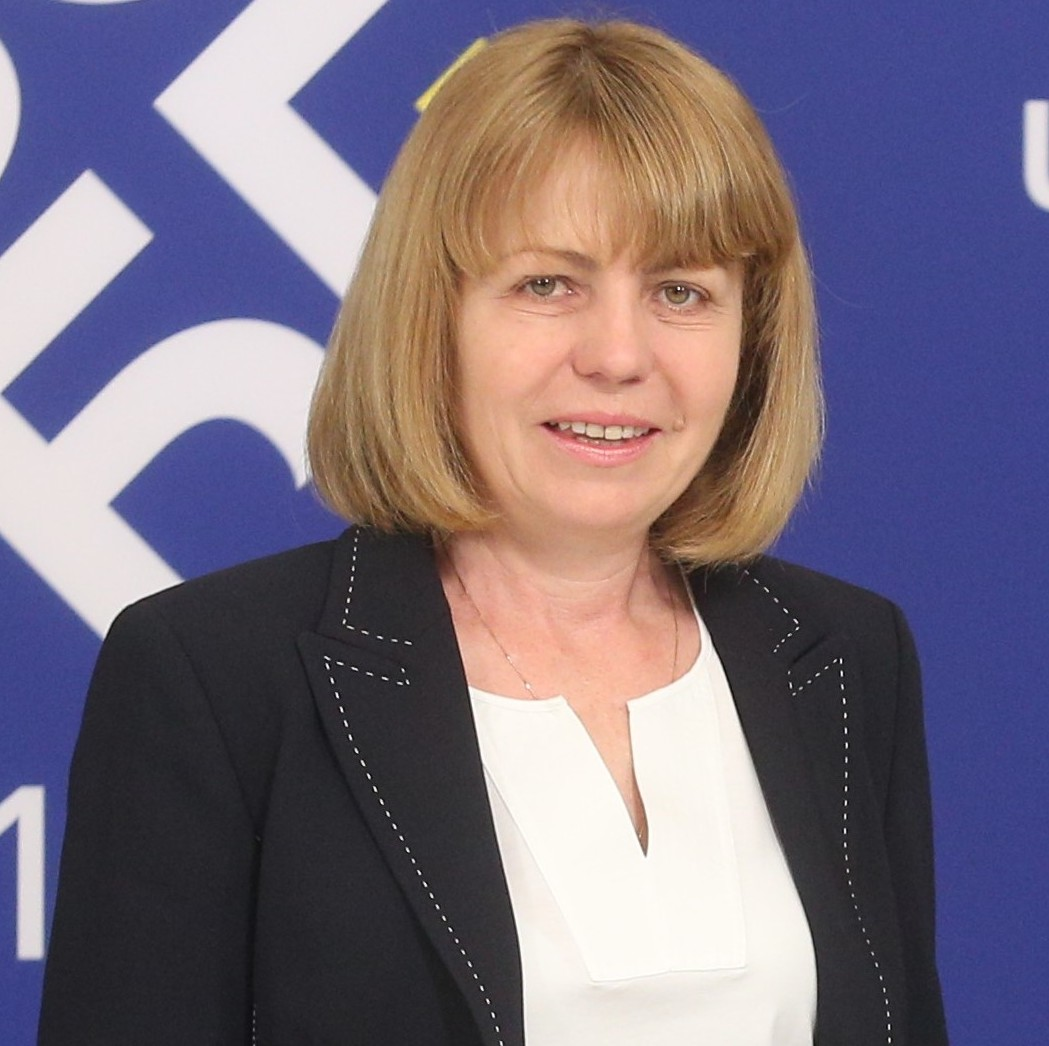

62nd Mayor of Sofia
- In office 23 November 2009 – 13 November 2023
- Preceded by: Minko Gerdzhikov (acting)
- Succeeded by: Vassil Terziev

Member of the National Assembly
- Incumbent
- Assumed office 19 June 2024
- Constituency: Sofia 25-MMC (2024); Sofia 24-MMC (2024-present)
- In office 14 July 2009 – 27 July 2009
- Constituency: Sofia 24-MMC (2009)

Minister of Education and Science
- In office 27 July 2009 – 19 November 2009
- Prime Minister: Boyko Borisov
- Preceded by: Daniel Valchev
- Succeeded by: Sergei Ignatov

Personal details
- Born: 12 April 1962 (age 64) Samokov, Bulgaria
- Party: GERB
- Spouse: Yuri Fandakov
- Children: 1
- Education: Sofia University

Yordanka Asenova Fandakova (Bulgarian: Йорданка Асенова Фандъкова; born 12 April 1962) is a Bulgarian politician and former Mayor of Sofia. She was the first woman to hold this position. She was elected on 15 November 2009, after defeating the Bulgarian Socialist Party contender Georgi Kadiev. Fandakova is a member of the conservative GERB party.

== Early life and education ==
Fandakova was born in Samokov, Sofia Province. She graduated the 35th Russian Language School in Sofia and the University of Sofia, majoring in Russian Studies. She is married and has a daughter. She was a teacher (from 1985) and head teacher (since 1998) at the 73rd secondary school for foreign languages "Vladislav Gramatik" in Sofia. She became Deputy Mayor of Sofia Municipality of Culture, Education, Sports and Prevention of Abuse in 2007.

== Political career ==
Fandakova was elected Member of Parliament for GERB in the National Assembly in the 2009 Bulgarian parliamentary election and was made Minister of Education, Youth and Science.

In October Fandakova took a leave because of campaign-trail for mayor elections in Sofia and was substituted by Sergei Ignatov, Deputy Minister of Education and Science who after she won election was appointed the new Minister of Education and Science.

On 15 November 2009, she was elected as mayor of Sofia. Fandakova received 66.23% of the vote in the elections held on 15 November 2009. The Socialist Party contender Georgi Kadiev received 27.71%, with a turnout of 23.17%.

She ran for another term as Mayor of Sofia in the 2019 Bulgarian local elections.

Her mandate ended four years later, as the 2023 Sofia mayoral election determined that Vassil Terziev would be the new Mayor.
