= Sofia University of Mining and Geology =

Sofia University of Mining and Geology Saint John of Rila
- Минно-геоложки университет
- Type: Public
- Established: 1953
- Rector: Prof. Ivaylo Koprev, PhD
- Students: ~2000
- Location: Sofia, Bulgaria
- Campus: Urban
- Website: http://www.mgu.bg

The Sofia University of Mining and Geology (Bulgarian: Минно-геоложки университет "Свети Йоан Рилски") is a state university in Sofia, Bulgaria, founded in 1953.

== History ==
The university were established in 1953 as High Mining and Geological Institute - (HMGI) with two faculties - Mining and Metallurgy and Mining and Mechanical Engineering.

== Structure ==
- Faculty of Mining
- Faculty of Mining and Mechanical Engineering
- Faculty of Geology

== Sport ==
- Basketball team of University of Mining and Geology
