= Bulgarian New Democracy =

Bulgarian New Democracy (Bulgarian: Българска Нова Демокрация, БНД) is a Political faction in the Bulgarian National Assembly formed on 2007-12-05 by fourteen dissenters of the National Movement for Stability and Progress who claim that their former party has lost its liberal roots. The faction may grow to about twenty MPs, but it is not expected to threaten the ruling government's majority. The leader of the faction is Borislav Ralchev.

The faction did not immediately decide whether it will found its own party or whether it will join an existing party — most likely the Citizens for European Development of Bulgaria —, but it announced that the voters would have the final word on that before the next elections are held in 2009. In the end, the party was formally established as a separate party on 11 May 2008, positioning itself in the centre-right and hoping to establish alliances with other centre-right parties.

Before the official announcement of the faction's foundation, European Liberal Initiative had been mentioned as a possible name.

In January 2008, BND suggested it may ally with the United Democratic Forces to form a new, right-wing movement.

== Election results ==
=== National Assembly ===
Election	Leader	Votes	%	Seats	+/–	Government
2017 (Note: Run as part of the Reformist Bloc coalition.)	Borislav Velikov	107,407	3.06 (#6)	0 / 240	New	Extra-parliamentary
Apr 2021	Did not contest			0 / 240	0	Extra-parliamentary
Jul 2021	Did not contest			0 / 240	0	Extra-parliamentary
Nov 2021	Did not contest			0 / 240	0	Extra-parliamentary
2022	Did not contest			0 / 240	0	Extra-parliamentary
2023	Did not contest			0 / 240	0	Extra-parliamentary
Jun 2024 (Note: Run as part of the Blue Bulgaria coalition.)	Borislav Velikov	33,613	1.52 (#9)	0 / 240	0	Extra-parliamentary
Oct 2024	Borislav Velikov	26,054	1.03 (#10)	0 / 240	0	Extra-parliamentary

=== European Parliament ===
Election	List leader	Votes	%	Seats	+/–	EP Group
2024 (Note: Run as part of the Blue Bulgaria coalition.)	Tsveta Kirilova	24,917	1.24 (#10)	0 / 17	New	–
