= Sofia City Council =

Legislature of the city of Sofia, Bulgaria

Sofia City Council Столичен общински съвет Stolichen obshtinski sŭvet

Type
- Type: Unicameral
- Term limits: 4 years

History
- Founded: 1991

Leadership
- Chairman: Tsvetomir Petrov, PP–DB since 8 February 2024
- Vice-chairmens: Bonka Vasileva (PP–DB); Vanya Tagareva (GERB-SDS); Andrey Zografski (Spasi Sofia); Diana Tonova (BSPzB); Vili Lilkov (KOD); Sevdalina Petrova (Bulgaria Can)

Structure
- Seats: 61
- Political groups: GERB-SDS (14); PP–DB (12); Spasi Sofia (8); BSPzB (8); Revival (4); KOD (3); ITN (3); Bulgaria Can (3) (Note: Former members of: Revival (3)); Solidary Bulgaria (1); VMRO (1); Independent (4) (Note: Former members of: PP-DB (3))
- Salary: c. 5,700 leva

Elections
- First election: 1991
- Last election: 29 October 2023
- Next election: by 29 October 2027

Website
- council.sofia.bg

The Sofia City Council is the legislative body of Sofia Municipality. It consists of 61 councilmen elected via proportional vote by constituents registered within the municipality.

== Committees ==
The Council has fourteen permanent committees:

- Assembly of the Territory, Architecture, and Housing policy (Chairperson: Sevdalina Petrova, Bulgaria Can);
- Finances and Budget (Chairperson: Dimitar Vuchev, GERB-SDS);
- Healthcare and Social policy (Chairperson: Vanya Grigorova, Solidary Bulgaria);
- Protection of the Environment, agriculture and forests (Chairperson: Krasimir Galabov, Bulgaria Can);
- Regional self-governing and regulatory use (Chairperson: Ivan Videlov, BSPzB);
- Education, Culture, Science and Cultural diversity (Chairperson: Diyan Stamatov, GERB-SDS);
- Economy, Property and Digital transformation (Chairperson: Proshko Proshkov, GERB-SDS);
- Engineer infrastructure and Energy planning (Chairperson: Aleksandar Aleksandrov, ITN);
- Public order and Security (Chairperson: Vanya Tagareva, GERB-SDS);
- Transport and Road safety (Chairperson: Ivan Takov, BSPzB);
- Children, Youth, and Sport (Chairperson: Dimitar Shalafov, Independent);
- Connections for urban integration (Chairperson: Nikolay Velchev, BSPzB);
- Global cooperation and Tourism, European programmes and projects (Chairperson: Tsvetelina Simeonova-Zarkin, PP–DB);
- Corruption and Unlawfully attained property confiscation committee (Chairperson: Anton Hekimian, GERB-SDS).
