= Spasi Sofia =

Bulgarian political party

Spasi Sofia Спаси София
- Abbreviation: SS
- Leader: Boris Bonev
- Founded: 2015 (as organization); November 2022 (as party)
- Headquarters: Sofia, Bulgaria
- Ideology: Regionalism; Social democracy
- Colours: Purple and yellow
- Sofia City Council: 8 / 61

Website
- spasisofia.org

Spasi Sofia (Bulgarian: Спаси София, lit. 'Save Sofia') is a Bulgarian non-governmental watchdog organization turned political party in November 2022. The organization monitors the work of the mayor and the administration of Sofia Municipality and raises the public awareness of many problems in the city management.

The organization has been a vocal critic of numerous issues with the management of the public transport network, road infrastructure, public procurement and investments, the preservation of historic buildings and the city's cultural heritage.

At the 2019 Bulgarian local elections Boris Bonev of Spasi Sofia was a candidate for both Mayor of Sofia and municipal councilor. He finished 4th in the mayoral election with 10,77% of the popular vote and was elected as municipal councilor.

In 2022, Spasi Sofia announced their intention to become a political party, and held an official 'founding congress' on 15 February 2023.

On 1 June 2023, Spasi Sofia was officially registered as a political party.

The party's chairman, Boris Bonev, has excluded the possibility of any deals with GERB for the 2023 local elections, however has not excluded the possibility of contesting the local elections together with the coalition PP-DB.
