= Petar Moskov =

Bulgarian physician and politician

- Петър Москов
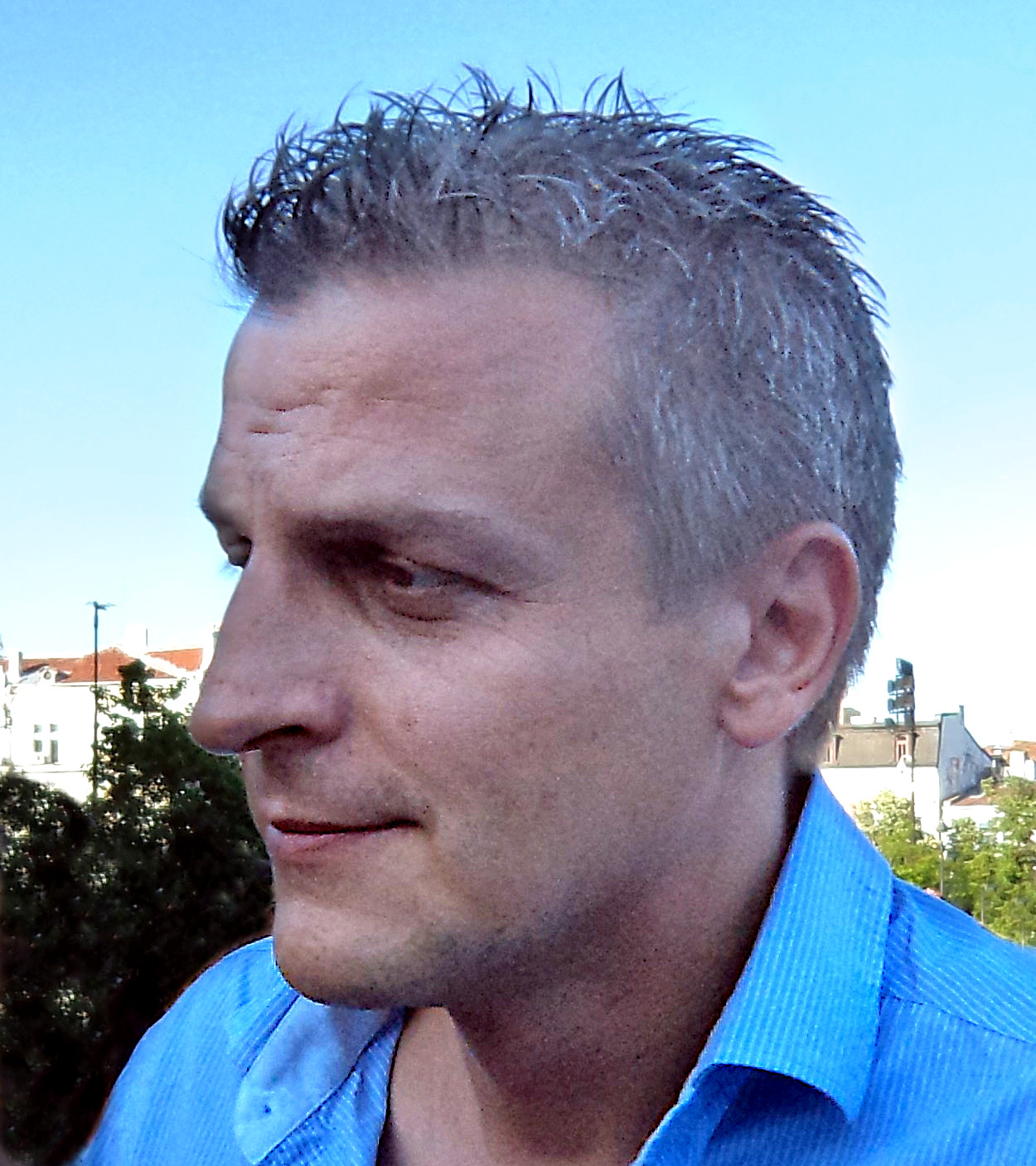
- Moskov in 2013

Minister of Health
- In office 7 November 2014 – 27 January 2017
- Prime Minister: Boyko Borisov
- Preceded by: Miroslav Nenkov
- Succeeded by: Ilko Semerdzhiev

Leader of the Conservative Union of the Right
- Incumbent
- Assumed office 28 March 2019
- Preceded by: Position established

Personal details
- Born: 17 December 1970 (age 55) Sofia, Bulgaria
- Party: Union of Democratic Forces (before 2004) Democrats for a Strong Bulgaria (2004-2016) Reformist Bloc (2013-2018) Independent (2016-2019) Conservative Union of the Right (2019-Present)
- Profession: Politician, Physician

Petar Stefanov Moskov (Bulgarian: Петър Стефанов Москов; born 17 December 1970) is a Bulgarian politician and anesthesiologist, who was the Minister of Health of Bulgaria as part of the Second Borisov Government. He was also among the leading members of the Reformist Bloc.

== Career ==
Born in Sofia, Moskov is a graduate of the Medical University in the capital city, specializing in anesthesiology and intensive care.

In 2004, Moskov was one of the founding members of the DSB. In 2013, he was elected as the vice-chairman of the party.

On 7 November 2014, Moskov assumed his duties as Minister of Health of Bulgaria, succeeding Miroslav Nenkov.

On 19 September 2016, the arbitrage board of DSB voted to remove Moskov from the party due to what they deemed to be his increasingly radical views, his refusal to resign from his position as minister after the party left the ruling coalition and nonpayment of party membership dues. Moskov reacted by accusing them of "returning to 1917" and postulated that his former party might desire to "intern himself and his family" in a prison.

== Political party project ==
In March 2019, Moskov announced that he would be forming a right-wing religious conservative political party dubbed the Conservative Rightist Unity (KOD), after separating from the Reformist Bloc as he thought it was not right-wing enough. His former coalition partners denounced both him and KOD, dubbing the party a project of "anti-European authoritarian conservatism".

The party was strongly conservative and right wing, viewing liberalism and socialism as its two greatest rivals. It declared its opposition to centrism and "popular" parties and instead sought to instead impose conservatism as the dominant social force, deeming it to support "rules and values that return normality". Consequently, he declared a principled opposition to all remaining Bulgarian political parties with the exception of IMRO – Bulgarian National Movement and the National Front for the Salvation of Bulgaria.

Moskov has declared that the previous right-wing governments' policies were akin to "a grandmother and grandfather watching porn together to see if they get married". He has cited the Trump Administration and Viktor Orbán's Hungary as examples of the type of right-wing conservatism his would seek to impose.

It declared its wish to impose a conservative ideology on Bulgaria in order to oppose what he dubbed the "obviously failed" principles of liberalism, socialism and green politics. He also sought to disfranchise former communists and BZNS members through a process of "criminal lustration", as well as those with lower education qualifications by one of his proposals to ban people that have not attained a certain level of academic education from voting in elections or referendums.

The party failed to register according to Bulgarian election law and declared that it was not ready to take part in the 2019 European Parliament election in Bulgaria. Meanwhile, both it and its former coalition partners all failed to obtain any seats in the country's parliamentary elections.

The party again failed to register for the 2019 Bulgarian local elections and as such did not appear on the ballot at all.

== Controversy ==
=== Refusal to send paramedics to minority neighbourhoods ===
In December 2014, Moskov declared that the ministry of Healthcare would refuse to send ambulances or medical personnel to neighbourhoods inhabited primarily by Bulgaria's Roma minority after stating that there were incidents of assaults on ambulances in those neighbourhoods. Due to his declaration, he faced public backlash and was accused of discrimination against the minority group.

=== Vaccine scandals ===
While serving as Minister for Health, he was embroiled in a scandal concerning the procurement of vaccines from Turkey. He was subsequently brought to criminal trial, accused of non-fulfilment of his duties through his acceptance of the delivery of non-authorized vaccines for use in Bulgaria. The accusation against him stated that his actions allegedly significantly undermined the Ministry of Health's credibility and raised anti-vaccination sentiments in the country.

He was also separately indicted of allegedly aiding in the creation of a bad government contract in which Bulgaria gave away 5,000,000 vaccine doses to a company for free.

== Personal life ==
He is a cousin of the film director Tedi Moskov. Moskov is married.
