= Conservative Union of the Right =

Bulgarian political party

Conservative Union of the Right Консервативно обединение на десницата
- Abbreviation: KOD
- Leader: Petar Moskov
- Founder: Petar Moskov
- Founded: 28 March 2019
- Split from: Democrats for Strong Bulgaria
- Headquarters: 9 Evlogi and Hristo Georgievi blvd., Sofia
- Ideology: National conservatism; Pro-Europeanism; Anti-communism; Russophobia; Right-wing populism
- Political position: Right-wing
- National affiliation: National Union of the Right (2021); Blue Bulgaria (2024)
- European affiliation: European Conservatives and Reformists (intention to join)
- Colors: Blue
- Slogan: "The Voice of the Free Bulgarian"
- National Assembly: 0 / 240
- European Parliament: 0 / 17
- Sofia City Council: 3 / 61
- Municipalities: 1 / 265

Website
- bulgarianconservatives.eu

The Conservative Union of the Right (Bulgarian: Консервативно обединение на десницата, romanized: Konservativno obedinenie na desnitsata, abbreviated as КОД/KOD) is a conservative Bulgarian political party. Its founder and current leader is the former Minister of Health of Bulgaria, Petar Moskov.

== History ==
The Conservative Union of the Right was founded on 29 March 2019 in Sofia by the former Minister of Health Petar Moskov, as well as other former members of Democrats for Strong Bulgaria. Moskov left the Reformist Bloc because he claimed that it was not right wing enough. His former coalition partners called his party a project of "anti-European authoritarian conservatism".

== Political positions ==
KOD is strongly conservative and right-wing, viewing liberalism and socialism as its two biggest rivals. Moskov declared his opposition to centrism and "popular" parties and tried to impose conservatism as the dominant social force, believing that it supports "rules and values that bring back normality". Therefore, he declared opposition to all other Bulgarian political parties, with the exception of VMRO and NFSB.

Moskov states that the policies of previous right-wing governments are similar to "grandparents watching porn together to see if they will get married". He points to Donald Trump's administration and Viktor Orban's Hungary as examples of the type of right-wing conservatism he would like to impose.

KOD aims to disenfranchise former communists and members of BZNS through a process of "criminal lustration", as well as those with lesser education, from voting in elections or referendums.

== Election results ==
=== National Assembly ===
Election	Leader	Votes	%	Seats	+/–	Government
Apr 2021	Petar Moskov	9,415	0.29 (#16)	0 / 240	New	Extra-parliamentary
Jul 2021 (Note: Run as part of the National Union of the Right coalition.)	Petar Moskov	7,872	0.28 (#13)	0 / 240	0	Extra-parliamentary
Nov 2021	Petar Moskov	11,239	0.42 (#14)	0 / 240	0	Extra-parliamentary
2022	Petar Moskov	5,028	0.19 (#19)	0 / 240	0	Extra-parliamentary
2023	Petar Moskov	7,739	0.29 (#12)	0 / 240	0	Extra-parliamentary
Jun 2024 (Note: Run as part of the Blue Bulgaria coalition.)	Petar Moskov	33,613	1.52 (#9)	0 / 240	0	Extra-parliamentary
Oct 2024	Petar Moskov	26,054	1.03 (#10)	0 / 240	0	Extra-parliamentary

=== European Parliament ===
Election	List leader	Votes	%	Seats	+/–	EP Group
2024 (Note: Run as part of the Blue Bulgaria coalition.)	Tsveta Kirilova	24,917	1.24 (#10)	0 / 17	New	–
