= Next Bulgarian parliamentary election =

- By 30 June 2030
- All 240 seats in the National Assembly; 121 seats needed for a majority
Party	Leader	Current seats
PB	Rumen Radev	131
GERB–SDS	Boyko Borisov	39
DB	Nadezhda Yordanova (Note: Yordanova serves as the group chair of Democratic Bulgaria. Bozhidar Bozhanov and Ivaylo Mirchev serve as co-leaders of Yes, Bulgaria!, while Radan Kanev serves as leader of Democrats for a Strong Bulgaria.)	21
DPS	Delyan Peevski	21
PP	Assen Vassilev	16
Revival	Kostadin Kostadinov	12
Incumbent Prime Minister
Rumen Radev; PB

Parliamentary elections are to be held in Bulgaria by 30 June 2030 to elect all 240 members of the National Assembly.

== Background ==
The 2026 parliamentary election resulted in a landslide victory for former president Rumen Radev and his newly formed party, Progressive Bulgaria. It received 44% of the vote and won 131 seats – an absolute majority in the legislature. GERB–SDS became the second-largest party, but suffered a significant decline, while the PP–DB coalition came third. Two other parties, the Movement for Rights and Freedoms and Revival also obtained representation. Multiple parties lost parliamentary representation due to falling short of the 4% electoral threshold, most notable the Bulgarian Socialist Party, which failed to obtain seats in parliament for the first time since 1990.

The newly elected 52nd National Assembly held its first sitting on 30 April 2026. Before the meeting, it was announced that unlike in previous legislatures, We Continue the Change and Democratic Bulgaria would be forming separate parliamentary groups, rather than forming a joint group.

On 8 May 2026, Radev was officially sworn in as the next Prime Minister of Bulgaria as the National Assembly approved him and his government.

== Opinion polls ==
=== Graphical summary ===
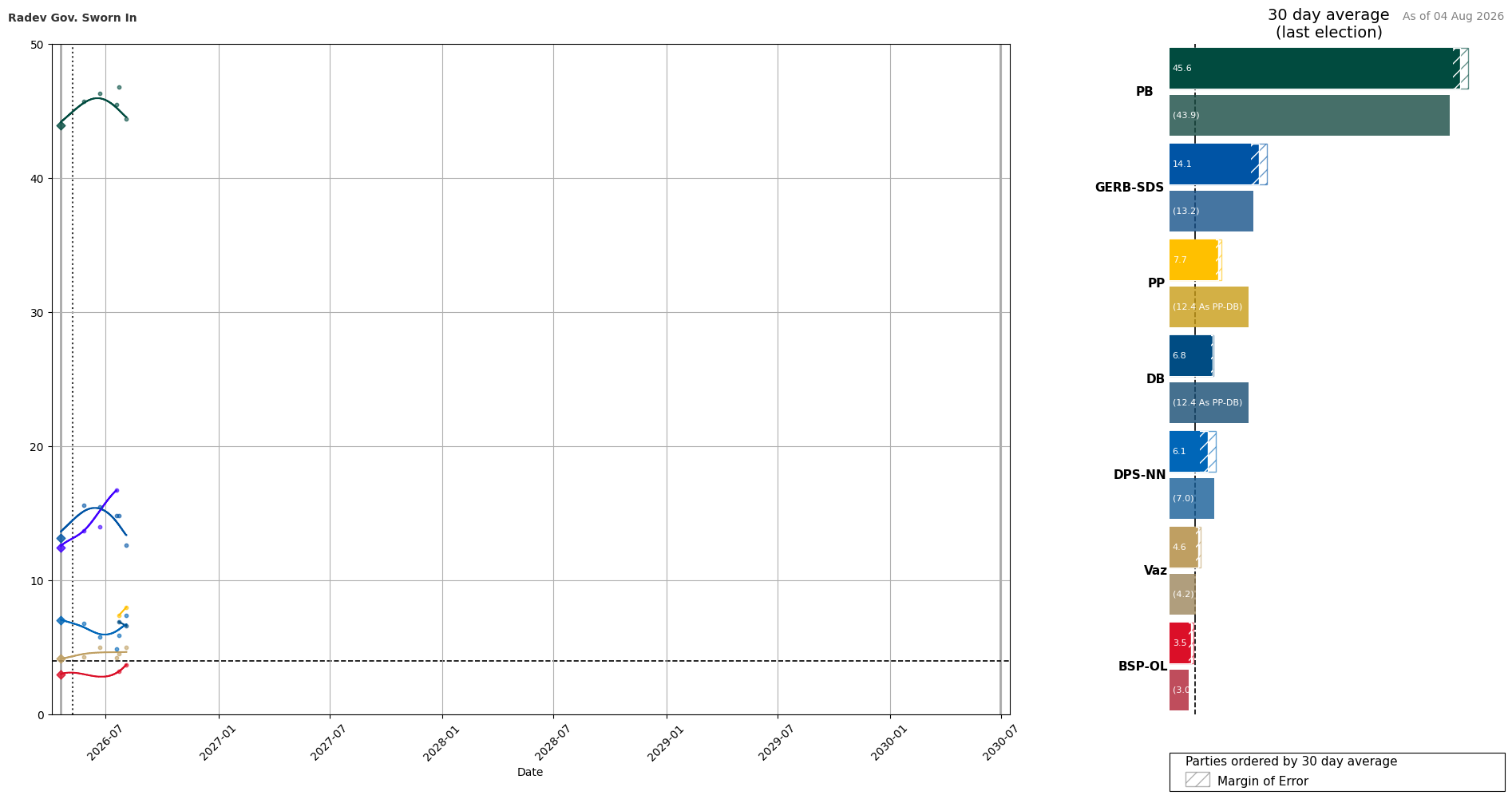
Local regression of polls conducted, excluding "none of the above"

=== Poll results ===
Opinion poll results below are recalculated from the original data by excluding undecided voters and non-voters. Seat projections are shown for each poll when available. 121 seats are needed for a parliamentary majority and all parties need to pass a 4% threshold (calculated excluding 'none of the above' votes) to win seats in the National Assembly.

Polling firm	Fieldwork date	Sample	PB	GERB–SDS	PP	DB	DPS	Vaz.	MECh	Veli.	BSP	APS	Others	NOTA	Lead
Gallup International	14–22 Oct 2026	1,001	35.6	14.7	12.3	6.7	7.0	6.3	3.2	2.7	3.1	–	6.9	1.8	20.9
Market Links	13–19 Oct 2026	1,006	37.3	11.2	11.9	8.8	6.5	5.1	–	–	–	–	17.1	2.2	25.4
Trend	26 Sep–2 Oct 2026	1,003	40.8	14.2	7.6	6.5	6.2	5.7	3.8	2.7	3.6	–	8.9	–	26.6
Market Links	26–29 Sep 2026	1,006	42.2	12.6	11.0	8.8	5.5	6.6	–	–	–	–	11.5	2.0	29.6
Gallup	24 Jul–4 Aug 2026	821	44.4	12.6	8.0	6.6	7.4	5.0	2.2	2.3	3.7	0.5	7.2	–	31.8
Alpha Research	17–23 Jul 2026	1,000	46.8	14.8	7.4	6.9	5.9	4.5	–	–	3.2	–	10.6	–	32.0
Market Links	11–19 Jul 2026	1,002	45.5	14.8	16.7		4.9	4.2	–	–	–	–	10.7	2.7	28.8
Market Links	13–21 Jun 2026	1,005	46.3	15.5	14.0		5.8	5.0	–	–	–	–	11.6	1.9	30.8
Market Links	16–27 May 2026	1,008	45.7	15.6	13.7		6.8	4.3	–	–	–	–	12.9	1.0	30.1
2026 election	19 Apr 2026	—N/a	43.9; 131	13.2; 39	12.4; 37		7.0; 21	4.2; 12	3.2; 0	3.1; 0	3.0; 0	1.5; 0	8.5; 0	1.5	30.7
