= 2025–2026 Bulgarian protests =

Series of demonstrations in Bulgaria

2025-2026 Bulgarian budget protests
- Part of the Gen Z protests and the Bulgarian political crisis (2021–2026)
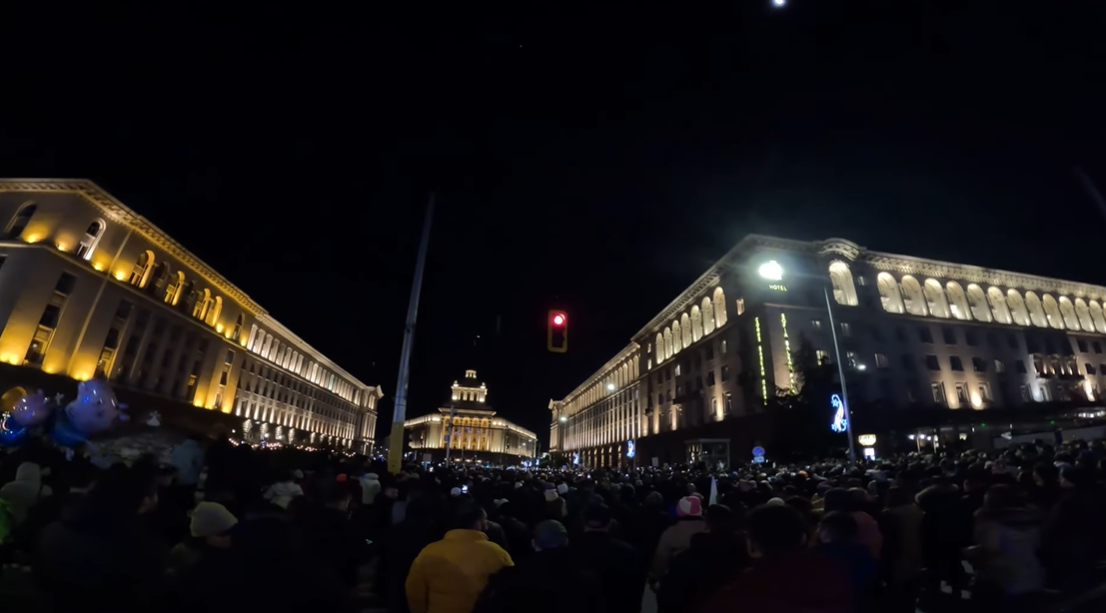
- Largo, Sofia, during the protests on 1 December 2025
- Date: 26 November 2025 – 14 January 2026
- Location: Bulgaria (with diaspora protests in Austria, Belgium, Czechia, Germany, the Netherlands, Spain, and the United Kingdom)
- Caused by: Corruption; Role of Delyan Peevski in government; State capture; 2026 Budget proposal
- Goals: Withdrawal of the 2026 Budget proposal; Increased anti-corruption; End of the Zhelyazkov Government
- Methods: Demonstrations; Picketing; Online activism; Student activism; Riots (on 1 December)
- Result: Protesters victory: Withdrawal of the 2026 Budget proposal; Resignation of the Zhelyazkov Government; Victory of Progressive Bulgaria in 2026 Bulgarian parliamentary election

Parties
Protesters; Anti-government demonstrators President of Bulgaria; Protesting parties: PP–DB; Revival (Note: Organized own protests, also protests against Bulgaria's entry into the Eurozone); Velichie (Note: Endorsed PP–DB led protests, but further organized independently); MECh	Government; National Police Service; Main targeted government parties: DPS–NN; GERB; Other government parties: BSP-OL; ITN

Lead figures
(Bulgaria) Decentralized leadership Political leaders Assen Vassilev; Bozhidar Bozhanov; Ivaylo Mirchev; Atanas Atanasov; Rumen Radev; Kostadin Kostadinov	Rosen Zhelyazkov; Daniel Mitov; Boyko Borisov; Delyan Peevski

Number
c. 20,000 (26 November 2025); 50,000 – c. 150,000 (1 December 2025); 100,000 – c. 250,000 (10 December 2025)	c. 100 police officers (10 December 2025, Sofia)

Casualties
- Injuries: 11+ (including at least 3 police officers)
- Arrested: 101+

Protests began in Bulgaria on 26 November 2025 after the Zhelyazkov government announced a 2026 budget plan that would have increased taxes—specifically, the amounts individuals were to contribute to pension and social-security programs. The government suspended, then withdrew the budget, but demonstrations continued, with protestors demanding the resignation of the government and new elections. The protests were identified as "Gen Z protests" by multiple sources.

Many university students in the capital of Sofia joined the mass protest. On 2 December, an estimated 50,000 people took part in a rally in Sofia, while demonstrations in other major cities drew another 50,000, organisers said. The Bulgarian media gave similar estimates, citing drone imagery. The estimates suggest that about 1.55% of the country's population participated.

On 11 December 2025, the Zhelyazkov government resigned, acknowledging "the voice of the people". "Our desire is to rise to the level of what society expects," Zhelyazkov said to reporters in Parliament in the capital, Sofia. "We have heard the voice of the people who have been protesting. We need to meet their demands, and what they are demanding at the moment is the resignation of the government."

Scale and significance of demonstration: Organizers and media reports estimated that tens of thousands people participated in the December protests, with some rallies drawing large crowds in Sofia and other cities. The demonstrations have been described as among the most significant public mobilizations in Bulgaria in years, reflecting deep public discontent with political corruption and governance.

== Causes ==
=== Corruption ===
In 2025, Transparency International ranked Bulgaria as having the highest perceived level of public-sector corruption among European Union member states alongside Hungary, while Eurostat data indicated that Bulgaria had the lowest GDP per capita in the Union.

This has resulted in public discontent and led to previous protests, such as the 2020–2021 Bulgarian protests.

Corruption was also stated as one of the reasons for the 2025 protests, with the topic being discussed extensively on social media. Former Prime Minister Boyko Borisov and DPS leader Delyan Peevski were targeted by the protests for their alleged corruption.

=== Conditions of doctors in Bulgaria ===
The protesters argued that the healthcare system was overlooked, underfunded and pushed young and experienced doctors to migrate to other countries.

This is part of a phenomenon that has been observed for decades, with 350 to 400 doctors leaving the country every year according to data from 2020.

=== 2026 Budget proposal ===
The 2026 Budget proposal sparked the current protests, and was criticized as the "worst budget in the last 30 years" by employer organizations. The protesters argued that the budget would have increased the individual contributions to pension and social-security programs, resulting in increased taxes to fund the pay of high-ranking officials, government administration and security institutions rather than to invest in social programs.

== Timeline ==
=== 2025 ===
==== 26 November ====
The first protest took place on 26 November 2025, when a crowd of protesters gathered in Sofia, being organized by We Continue the Change – Democratic Bulgaria. The protest drew around 20,000 people. The goal of the protests was to surround the parliament, thus stopping MPs from the governing majority from leaving the building. MPs from the PP-DB parliamentary group guarded the main exits of the National Assembly, while protestors attempted to form a human chain. The beginning of the protest was marked by the arrival of a white bus belonging to the Bulgarian police force, which had previously been used during the 2013–2014 protests against the government of Plamen Oresharski. Besides supporters of PP-DB, the protest was attended by MPs from Revival and MECh, as well as former leader of the BSP, Korneliya Ninova.

The protest was mostly peaceful, although occasional clashes between police forces and anti-government protestors did occur. A van belonging to the Gendarmerie was surrounded and pushed by protesters, although it was eventually recovered by the police. Similarly, a car belonging to the National Service for Protection (NSP) was surrounded and pelted with objects. Objects were reportedly thrown at the police cordon guarding the National Assembly, with 3 police officers being injured. At 22:00, the chief inspector of the Sofia Police Department, Ivan Georgiev, requested that the mayor order the protestors to disperse due to violations of public order, as well as the fact that the protest had been scheduled to end at that time. The request was, however, denied by Sofia mayor Vasil Terziev. In the aftermath of the protest, a video circulated on social media showing a man in a police uniform antagonising protesters and being held back by his colleague.

The protest was scheduled to take place concurrently with a meeting of the Budget and Finance Commission, which was set to review the proposed budgets of the National Health Insurance Fund and Social Security Institute. Unexpectedly, the committee's chairman and long time MP from GERB, Delyan Dobrev, summoned the meeting two hours earlier than the scheduled time. The commission's start was disrupted by PP leader and former finance minister, Assen Vassilev, who called the meeting an "outrage" and stated several times "it will not happen this way", referring to the alleged plans of the governing majority to vote on the proposed budgets without proper debate. The 7-hour session was screened at the protests.

After the session, scuffles between MPs from the governing majority and staff members belonging to PP-DB were reported in the corridors. Specifically, PP-DB alleged that DPS MP, Hamid Hamid, attacked two young staff members while they were filming inside the National Assembly.

==== 27 November ====
In the morning, GERB leader Boyko Borisov announced his support for the withdrawal of the proposed budget for 2026. Shortly thereafter, Prime Minister Rosen Zhelyazkov held a press briefing in which he announced a "suspension" of the current budget proposal process pending a restoration of dialogue with trade unions and employer organisations. He characterised the protest as "spontaneous" and promised to find a "middle ground" between the demands of protestors and fiscal realities. The decision to withdraw the budget was praised by representatives from PP-DB.

DPS leader Delyan Peevski condemned the protests, comparing the blockade of parliament to the "Peoples Courts" during communist rule and threatened to blockade parliament "every day" with his supporters. He further re-affirmed the parties support for the incumbent government.

Deputy prime minister and BSP leader, Atanas Zafirov, clarified at a press conference that the budget was not withdrawn but "postponed" and that the party would "rethink" its participation in government if the social measures agreed to were removed from the budget.

In the evening, Boyko Borisov claimed that "dialogue has been restored" after a meeting between representatives of trade unions, employer organisations and the finance ministry in GERB's office.

==== 28 November ====
On the morning of 28 November, there Velichie organised protests took place outside the parliament, demanding the resignation of the incumbent government. During the protest traffic movement in central Sofia was blocked after the intentional breakdown of cars by Velichie protesters.

Confusion increasingly emerged about what the suspension meant. Speaking to journalists on 28 November, Borisov clarified that the budget was not technically withdrawn, but rather that it would not be reviewed by the parliament until an agreement was reached with employers and trade unions. His statement was interrupted by Yes, Bulgaria's co-leader, Ivaylo Mirchev, who demanded that Borisov explain if the budget would be withdrawn and if tax increases would be retained. During the confrontation between Borisov and PP-DB leaders, they demanded that the government must withdraw the budget entirely in order to rework the financial projections. Borisov in turn claimed the previous protests were organised by the Alliance for Industrial Capital in Bulgaria and challenged PP-DB to organise their own.

Borisov's claim that the previous protests were organised by the AICB was supported by Delyan Peevski, who further declared that DPS represented the entire population.

Following the statements by Borisov and Peevski, PP-DB announced new protests scheduled for 1 December against the budget.

==== 1 December ====
On 1 December 2025, between 50,000 and 100,000 people showed up to the protest organized by PP-DB, with the protest being supported by various other civil society groups and social media influencers in Sofia. The protest was heavily promoted through the use of social media (such as TikTok and Instagram) and by high-profile singers, actors and influencers. The protest was actively attended by people from Generation Z, who made up a substantial proportion of the gathered protestors.

The protest initially started as peaceful, with speeches from the leaders of PP-DB and representatives of protest organisations. During the speech by former Prime Minister and PP co-leader, Kiril Petkov, he called for protesters to carry out a procession towards the offices of GERB and DPS.

The manifestation turned violent with dumpsters set alight, vandalised police vehicles, and attacks on GERB, There is Such a People and DPS offices. However, organizers claimed that those who rioted violently were not part of the protests but were provocateurs allegedly sent by the government. Protesters specifically condemned allegedly manipulated news recordings of the riot. At least 71 people were arrested, and 3 officers were injured. A cyberattack on the official streaming account broadcasting the event failed.

The protest was further accompanied by a range of technical malfunctions. Specifically, during the protest a black out occurred in parts of central Sofia, in what the Ministry of Energy classified as a likely act of sabotage.

Besides Sofia, protests took place in a number of other regional towns, including Varna, Plovdiv and Blagoevgrad. Counter-protests took place in Stara Zagora, targeting the Recovery and Sustainability Plan which had been developed during the Denkov Government.

The protest led to demands for the government's resignation from a range of political figures, including President Rumen Radev.

==== 2 December ====
After the protest the budget proposal was officially withdrawn by the government, with a promise to present a re-worked budget. However, PP-DB declared that the measure was unsatisfactory and they now demanded the resignation of the government. They further demanded the resignation of Minister of the Interior, Daniel Mitov, for the mismanagement of the protests.

Prime Minister Rosen Zhelyazkov insisted that the government would not resign and characterised the protest as primarily "social".

In a televised address to the nation, President Radev called on the government to resign and for snap elections to be held.

==== 3 December ====
In a statement to the press, DPS leader, Delyan Peevski accused PP-DB of trying to incite ethnic hatred against Turkish and Roma voters. He further claimed PP-DB co-leader, Ivaylo Mirchev had "bent" towards him during the time of the Denkov Government. Peevski's statement led to a scuffle in the corridors of the National Assembly, when Mirchev attempted to confront him in his office. The two men were separated by members of the National Service for Protection, tasked with guarding Peevski.

Despite the government withdrawing the budget, on 3 December 2025, protests against the government took place in Ruse, Pazardzhik, Sliven, Burgas, Varna, Montana, Veliko Tarnovo, Razgrad, Vidin, Blagoevgrad, Shumen, Yambol, and Sofia, asking the leading coalition to step down and decisive action against corruption. The protests passed mostly peacefully, although clashes between protesters and police were reported, specifically in Sliven.

Plans for an organized protest on 4 December 2025 were further scheduled and promoted on Facebook by someone known as Marian Ivanov.

==== 4 December ====
On 4 December, a parliamentary hearing was held with the attendance of minister of the interior, Daniel Mitov and senior police leadership about the riots on 1 December. During the hearing, opposition MPs, specifically from PP-DB, accused the ministry of having allowed provocateurs to enter the protests. Mitov, on the other hand, claimed it was the responsibility of the organisers to alert the police about the presence of provocateurs and accused PP-DB of having caused disturbances by encouraging an unregistered manifestation. He further denied allegations that provocateurs had been affiliated with the government, stating that at least two of those arrested during the riots were members of MECh and Velichie. The hearing was accompanied by a claim of police brutality against one of the detainees.

Protests organised by Revival took place on the evening of 4 December in Haskovo and Smolyan. Additionally, protests organised by the NGO "Boets" and supported by We Continue the Change took place in Sofia outside the Ministry of Interior, which demanded Mitov's resignation. Finally, anti-government demonstrations also took place in Varna, Vratsa and Stara Zagora.

Protests were also organised by supporters of the party Velichie outside the residence of GERB leader, Boyko Borisov in Bankya. The protest was condemned by GERB politicians, who organised a counter-protest in support of Borisov.

==== 5 December ====
On 5 December 2025, 61 MPs from the opposition in the National Assembly filed a vote of no confidence against the Zhelyazkov government, blaming them for alleged corruption and their failure to pursue economic policies. Two Gen-Zers who participated in the protests, named Ani Bodakova and Kaloyan Vasev, were also present and were involved in the process as representatives of their generation. PP-DB announced that a new protest would take place concurrently with the debate on the vote, if the government did not resign.

Minor protests took place in Vidin and Vratsa.

==== 6 December ====
Minister of Finance, Temenuzhka Petkova, published the renewed budget for 2026 after a tentative agreement with employer organisations and trade unions about the macro-economic parameters of the budget. Despite the exclusion of unpopular tax raises, the opposition and President announced their opposition to the new budget claiming that it inflated public debt and delayed taxation increases for later.

==== 7 December ====
Delyan Peevski announced that DPS would organise counter-protests in support of the government on 9 December, after meetings with the Regional Coordinators of DPS.

==== 8 December ====
The reviewed budget for 2026 was submitted by the cabinet to the National Assembly.

==== 9 December ====
The budgetary commission of the National Assembly approved the reviewed budget for 2026, as well as the budgets for the Health Insurance Fund and Social Security Institute.

In the evening, the DPS organised a counter-protest, with the slogan "No to Hate", which took place in around 20 towns, including Kardzhali, Montana, Pleven, Kyustendil, Yambol and Vratsa. The counter-protests typically gathered a few hundred people, with a few thousand reportedly joining in Kardzhali and Belitsa. In Stara Zagora, the counter-protest was further endorsed by the local GERB organisation. The planned protest was barred from taking place in Botevgrad due to potential public disturbances.

==== 10 December ====
On 10 December 2025, during ongoing debates for the sixth vote of no confidence, protests involving thousands of people occurred throughout Bulgaria, with large numbers of police and checkpoints mobilized in response. Students from various Bulgarian universities announced the start of the "Student protest march", gathering and joining the protest en masse. At least 30 people were arrested in Sofia. On the same day, significant protests by the Bulgarian diaspora took place in Austria, Belgium and the Czech Republic in coordination with the Bulgarian ones. The protests in Bulgaria drew between 150,000 and 250,000 people on that day.

==== 11 December ====
On 11 December 2025, Prime Minister Rosen Zhelyazkov announced the government's resignation on a live broadcast. This came minutes right before parliament was due to vote on a no-confidence motion and after an evaluation done by the parties within the government which also took into account the protests, which were cited as a main reason on why the government decided to step down.

He stated that:

People of all ages, ethnic backgrounds, and religions have spoken out in favour of [the government's] resignation. This civic energy must be supported and encouraged.

— Rosen Zhelyazkov, 11 December 2025

Assen Vassilev called the government's stepping down "the first step in making Bulgaria a normal European state".

==== 12 December ====
On 12 December 2025, 227 MPs (constituting all present MPs) voted in favor of the resignation of the Bulgarian government. President Rumen Radev announced that he would begin consultations with the parliamentary groups, as mandated by the constitution, in order to ascertain if any new government could be formed under the mandate of the current parliament. Following these consultations, the President would hand the first mandate to form a government to the largest parliamentary group, GERB-SDS.

Boyko Borissov, GERB's leader, indicated that GERB-SDS would return the mandate unfulfilled. Reuters, in an article, noted that: "In such a scenario, unless two other parties accept the mandate to form a government, Radev will appoint an interim administration and call a snap election". Meanwhile, some political analysts, such as commentator Daniel Smilov and Ivaylo Noizi Tsvetkov (co-founder of the popular Egoist magazine (in Bulgarian)) called for the continuation and intensification of the protests as to "protect its [the protests] ideas and prevent their distortion" and prevent the election of Peevski as PM.

==== 15 December ====
On 15 December, the government announced that it would submit a law extending the budget for 2025 into the first three months of 2026. The move was justified by the need to preserve welfare payments and the proper functioning of the state at a time when no majority existed for the passing of a regular budget. Previously, PP-DB had demanded that the 2025 budget be extended in order for the 2026 budget to be produced by a new government.

==== 16 December ====
On 16 December, the relevant parliamentary commissions approved the extension of the 2025 budget, as well as the budgets of the National Health Insurance Fund and Social Security Institute.

==== 17 December ====
During the plenary session on 17 December, MPs from GERB-DPS-BSP-ITN unexpectedly voted to include the previously proposed 2026 budget along with the extension of the 2025 budget on the parliamentary agenda. In response, PP-DB accused the parties of attempting to impose the budget upon the population for the "fourth time" and threatened to organise new protests. Shortly after PP-DBs statement, ITN and GERB held an emergency briefing where they clarified that the inclusion of the 2026 budget had been done at the BSP's request and promised to vote only in favour of the budget extension law proposed by the government. After a short break, the inclusion of the 2026 budget in the parliament's agenda was re-voted, and did not receive a majority from present MPs. Later, the plenary session officially approved the law extending the 2025 budgets.

Despite the removal of the 2026 budget from the agenda, PP-DB announced their intention to organise renewed protests on 18 December, demanding the resignation of acting General Prosecutor, Borislav Sarafov, restoration of machine voting and the removal of security from members of parliament. The protest coincided with a demonstration organised by the civic organisation, Justice for All, against Sarafov, who encouraged their supporters to join the PP-DB-organised protest after the conclusion of their own.

DPS leader Delyan Peevski set up an exhibition called "The Museum of the Deal" which showed photos, legislation and alleged text messages between Peevski and members of PP-DB.

==== 18 December ====
The protests called by PP-DB took place. gathering tens of thousands of people all over Bulgaria. The protests called for fair elections, widespread resentment for proposals to reintroduce the budget and also (the protests) kept an anti-Peevski attitude which was also observed in previous protests. Gen Z once again showed up in a considerable way.

==== 19 December ====
In the morning claims about journalists Maria Tsantsarova and Zlatimir Yochev being fired became widespread, leading to the spontaneous organization of a protest later in the day in front of the bTV headquarter, with protesters using slogans similar to the ones in the earlier days of protests and advising the broadcasters to not hinder freedom of press by firing independent voices. The Association of European Journalists and the Council for Electronic Mediain in Bulgaria also openly supported the protests, promoting them alongside the PP-DB which commented on the status of politicized news reportage and their management in Bulgaria. bTV later stated that the rumors regarding the journalists being fired was actually false, and that they were actually just discussing the future of their career with them, however, the protests continued, with some remaining skeptical. Meanwhile, the Confederation of Independent Trade Unions in Bulgaria announced they would organize protests against the decision of the National Assembly not to adopt the laws on the state budget.

=== 2026 ===
==== 14 January ====
Protests organised by PP-DB, and supported by a number of political parties including Revival, APS, MECh, and Velichie, took place in Sofia demanding that the upcoming snap elections be conducted using machine voting. The protest was meant to coincide with a meeting of the commission on judicial and constitutional questions, set to discuss potential amendments to the electoral code, including a proposal to introduce vote counting machines in place of currently existing machine voting installations. Representatives of PP-DB threatened to continue organising protests if the amendments were passed or if machine voting was not re-introduced, and urged attendees to sign up as election observers.

It was further announced that the pig sculpture which had been installed outside the parliament building in late November, and had become a symbol of the protests, would be sent on a "national tour" in order to increase interest in the upcoming elections.

== Symbols ==
During the protests, the Straw Hat Pirates' Jolly Roger was used as a symbol. Other symbols that appeared on signs held by the people on the protests included the letters "Д" (D) and "Б" (B), the Cyrillic initials of Delyan Peevski and Boyko Borissov, crossed out to show disapproval. Caricatures of pigs were also common, usually seen as a mockery of heavy-set oligarchs.

== Analysis and political implications ==
One of the organizers that was behind the protests has been identified as "We Continue the Change – Democratic Bulgaria" coalition. Constituent parties within the organisation, such as Yes, Bulgaria!, endorsed the protests.

The protest has been notable for attracting support from a wide range of political parties, unlike previous waves of anti-government action. For example, far-right and nationalist groups supported the protests. Additionally, a Turkish minority interests coalition, the Alliance for Rights and Freedoms, similarly expressed support for them.

Other parties that supported the protests, but did not directly participate within them, nor organized protests on their own, were Bulgarian Rise, Green Movement and VMRO.

Vessela Tcherneva, the Spokesperson of the Bulgarian Ministry of Foreign Affairs, and deputy director at the European Council on Foreign Relations in Sofia, hinted that the protests could influence future governments and their behaviours towards policy-making and how they approached the population.

== See also ==
- 2013 Bulgarian protests against the first Borisov cabinet
- 2013–2014 Bulgarian protests against the Oresharski cabinet
- 2020–2021 Bulgarian protests
- Bulgarian political crisis (2021–2026)
- 2024-present Serbian anti-corruption protests
- Flamingo Revolution
