= Democratic Bulgaria =

Bulgarian political party

Democratic Bulgaria Демократична България
- Abbreviation: DB
- Leaders: Ivaylo Mirchev; Bozhidar Bozhanov; Atanas Atanasov
- Founders: Hristo Ivanov; Atanas Atanasov
- Founded: 12 April 2018; 8 years ago
- Preceded by: Reformist Bloc
- Ideology: Liberal conservatism; Conservative liberalism; Liberalism (Bulgarian); Anti-corruption; Pro-Europeanism
- Political position: Centre-right
- National affiliation: PP–DB (2023–2026)
- European affiliation: European People's Party (Note: DaB! has expresses interest in joining the EPP and DSB is a full member.)
- Colours: Blue White Green Red
- National Assembly: 21 / 240
- European Parliament: 1 / 17

Website
- demokrati.bg

Democratic Bulgaria (DB, Bulgarian: Демократична България, romanized: Demokratichna Balgariya, ДБ) is a political alliance and a Parliamentary group in Bulgaria. Founded on 12 April 2018 as an electoral alliance between three political parties – DaB, DSB and the Green Movement. It merged into PP–DB in 2023, however in April 2026 PP and DB formed two separate groups in Parliament. The Green Movement left PP–DB in 2024, but DaB and DSB maintain close relations and brand themselves as "Democratic Bulgaria".

== History ==
The creation of Democratic Bulgaria was officially announced through the symbolic signing of a declaration entitled "A Democratic Bulgaria Can Do More". The three parties united after several months of talks on cooperation during the next general election. In its manifesto, the union set out its main goals, including to be an alternative to the current government and to consolidate Bulgaria's democratic values and Euro-Atlantic choices.

== Structure ==
The Democratic Bulgaria structure has two co-leaders – Hristo Ivanov of Yes, Bulgaria! and Atanas Atanasov of Democrats for a Strong Bulgaria. The leaders of The Greens – Vladislav Panev and Borislav Sandov – also participate in the union's council.

At the Congress of Yes, Bulgaria!, Hristo Ivanov proposed the formation of a joint board between the three DB member parties in order to coordinate decision making between the three parties, with PP similarly invited.

=== Composition ===
| Party | Abbr. | Founded | Leader | Ideology | MPs | MEPs |
|---|---|---|---|---|---|---|
| Yes, Bulgaria! Да, България! | DaB! | 7 January 2017 | Hristo Ivanov | Liberalism; Anti-corruption; Pro-Europeanism | 14 / 240 | 0 / 17 |
| Democrats for a Strong Bulgaria; Демократи за силна България | DSB | 30 May 2004 | Atanas Atanasov | Liberal conservatism Pro-Europeanism; Anti-communism | 6 / 240 | 1 / 17 |

== Political positions ==
=== Finance ===
Some of DB's priorities are Bulgaria's Eurozone and Banking union membership, a reduction of budget spending to 1/3 of the GDP, as well as taxation reform, with a reduction of VAT from 20% to 18% and a non-taxable minimum of the income tax.

=== Defense ===
In the sphere of defense, the party seeks public support of the Armed Forces using the Social contract of defensive politics.

=== Presidential endorsement ===
For the 2021 Bulgarian presidential election, DB supported the election bid of Lozan Panov, the chairman of the Bulgarian supreme court.

== Election results ==
=== 2019 European Parliament election ===
In order to select its candidates, Yes, Bulgaria! conducted a remote preliminary election. Those willing to vote could do it digitally using the mobile app of Yes, Bulgaria! or by mail. All members of Yes, Bulgaria! had the right to participate, together with everyone who received an invitation from a current party member. The electoral process began on 27 November 2018, and the final results were declared on 11 February 2019. A total of 5898 people voted, and the candidate with the most votes was Stefan Tafrov, a diplomat and former ambassador.

The candidate of Democrats for a Strong Bulgaria for the European elections Svetoslav Malinov was selected through a resolution during the party's National Congress on 12 November 2018. Malinov has been a Member of the European Parliament since 2009 as a member of the European People's Party.

On February 22, 2019, The Greens announced their primary candidate for the elections – Albena Simeonova – an environmentalist and entrepreneur in the sphere of bio agriculture. She was elected through an online vote on the website of the party.

Democratic Bulgaria eventually won one seat in the 2019 European Parliament election, which went to DSB member Radan Kanev.

=== 2019 Local elections ===
Local elections were held across Bulgaria on 27 October 2019, with Democratic Bulgaria failing to win a single mayoral contest, but far exceeding expectations in the capital Sofia, where they won 8 out of 25 districts, including most of the city center. The results were seen as a serious setback for the ruling party GERB, which had until then maintained a strong hold on the capital, winning 23 out of 25 districts in 2015.

== Electoral history ==
=== National Assembly ===
| Election | Votes | % | Seats | +/– | Government |
|---|---|---|---|---|---|
| Apr 2021 | 302,280 | 9.45 (#5) | 27 / 240 | New | Snap election |
| Jul 2021 | 345,331 | 12.64 (#4) | 34 / 240 | ▲7 | Snap election |
| Nov 2021 | 166,966 | 6.37 (#6) | 16 / 240 | ▼18 | Coalition |
| 2022 | 186,511 | 7.45 (#6) | 20 / 240 | ▲4 | Snap election |
| 2023 | PP–DB | | 26 / 240 | ▲6 | Coalition |
| Jun 2024 | PP–DB | | 17 / 240 | ▼9 | Snap election |
| Oct 2024 | PP–DB | | 18 / 240 | ▲1 | Opposition |
| 2026 | PP–DB | | 21 / 240 | ▲3 | Opposition |

=== European Parliament ===
| Election | Votes | % | Seats | +/– |
|---|---|---|---|---|
| 2019 | 118,484 | 6.06 (#5) | 1 / 17 | New |

=== President ===
Presidential elections
| Election | Candidate | First round | | | Second round | | |
| Election | Candidate | Votes | % | Rank | Votes | % | Result |
|---|---|---|---|---|---|---|---|
| 2021 | Lozan Panov | 98,488 | 3.68 | 5th | —N/a | | Lost |
| 2026 | Andrey Gyurov | 486,232 | 31.95 | 2nd | 750,251 | 39.48 | Lost |
