= We Continue the Change – Democratic Bulgaria =

Political coalition

We Continue the Change – Democratic Bulgaria Продължаваме промяната – Демократична България
- Abbreviation: PP–DB
- Leader: Assen Vassilev; Bozhidar Bozhanov; Ivaylo Mirchev; Radan Kanev
- Parliamentary leader: Nikolai Denkov; Nadezhda Yordanova
- Founders: Kiril Petkov; Assen Vassilev; Hristo Ivanov; Atanas Atanasov
- Founded: 13 February 2023
- Dissolved: 30 April 2026
- Ideology: Liberalism; Anti-corruption; Pro-Europeanism
- Political position: Centre to centre-right
- European affiliation: Alliance of Liberals and Democrats for Europe Party (PP); European People's Party (DSB)
- European Parliament group: Renew Europe (PP); European People's Party Group (DSB)
- Coalition members: We Continue the Change; Yes, Bulgaria! Democrats for a Strong Bulgaria
- Colours: Indigo
- Slogan: Има Как ('There is a Way')
- National Assembly: 37 / 240
- European Parliament: 3 / 17
- Municipalities: 7 / 265
- Sofia City Council: 12 / 61

Website
- ppdb.bg

We Continue the Change – Democratic Bulgaria (Bulgarian: Продължаваме промяната – Демократична България, ПП–ДБ, romanized: Prodŭlzhavame promyanata – Demokratichna Bŭlgariya, PP–DB), was a Bulgarian electoral coalition between We Continue the Change and Democratic Bulgaria (DaB and DSB). The alliance was formed prior to the 2023 election. The coalition was part of the Denkov Government between 2023 and 2024.

On 30 April 2026, We Continue the Change and Democratic Bulgaria formed separate parliamentary groups in the National Assembly, effectively dissolving it on the parliamentary level, but they announced that they would retain the electoral alliance for the 2026 presidential election and in municipal councils.

== Background ==
=== Bulgarian political crisis ===
Following numerous corruption scandals linked to the governing GERB party, several anti-corruption parties made breakthroughs in the April 2021 election. One of such parties was the liberal-conservative group, Democratic Bulgaria (DB). Due to the resulting political deadlock, no government could be formed and the country would go onto face two further elections in 2021, one in July and one in November. Before the November election, two popular ministers from Stefan Yanev's first interim government, Kiril Petkov and Assen Vassilev formed a new centrist political force, the We Continue the Change (PP). PP would go on to win the November election, and negotiated a government with DB, alongside the Socialist Party (BSP) and another anti-corruption party There Is Such a People (ITN).

The government fell after less than seven months in power, after ITN pulled out due to disagreements over the Budget and Macedonian accession to the European Union. The government was voted out in a Vote of No Confidence. President Rumen Radev called an election in October 2022, in which PP fell back to second behind GERB. No government could be formed as a result of the election, and so a further election was set to be held in April 2023.

=== Formation ===
The alliance was announced on 10 February 2023. The alliance's stated aim was to get the most votes in the April 2023 election, giving them the first chance of forming a government. A joint declaration titled "We Continue Together" was signed on 13 February 2023 by representatives of PP, Yes, Bulgaria!, Democrats for a Strong Bulgaria, and the Green Movement (ZD), formally announcing the formation of the alliance.

== History ==
The coalition was formed ahead of the 2023 election. There were disagreements between members of the alliance over the orders and members of regional lists. Prior to the final announcement and submission of the regional lists, some PP members left the party, notably MPs Ivan Hristanov and Alexander Dunchev. On 27 February, Ivan Dimitrov, a DB MP and candidate from Blagoevgrad announced that he would be withdrawing from politics, citing problems with the joint list. Following the 2023 election, where the coalition placed second, they negotiated and formed the rotational Denkov Government with GERB. Following nine months in power, negotiations around the rotation collapsed and the June 2024 snap election was scheduled.

Following the June 2024 election there was increasing speculation that the parties would separate, particularly following the alliance's poor performance, the resignation of Hristo Ivanov, SEK and the Green Movement left the alliance and internal disagreements regarding MP candidate selection. However the coalition ultimately continued, after negotiations.

Following the October 2024 election, PP-DB requested a cordon sanitaire against DPS-NN. In November the coalition proposed Atanas Atanasov as Chariman of Parliament and GERB expressed openness to the idea, as long as it led to negotiations for the formation of a government. On 28 November, the gridlocked 51st National Assembly failed to elect a Chairman for the 7th time, with ITN's Silvi Kirilov (supported by all parties except GERB, DPS-NN and BSP-OL) falling two votes short, due to Daniel Lorer and Yavor Bozhankov not supporting his candidacy. PP immediately moved to expel both members from the group, however DB was against the decision. Nataliya Kiselova from BSP-OL was ultimately elected in early December, with the support of GERB, PP-DB BSP-OL and APS. GERB began negotiations for a government in late December with BSP-OL, ITN and PP-DB, with DPS-NN and APS specifically excluded by GERB. PP did not attend the negotiations, due to GERB not having signed the cordon sanitaire declaration, however representatives of the parties of DB attended. In early January 2025 GERB announced the suspension of negotiations with DB. Soon afterwards GERB announced the formation of the Zhelyazkov minority government between GERB, BSP-OL and ITN. The government was ultimately apporoved with the support of APS and later DPS-NN. PP-DB announced they would be in opposition to the government but would abstain on votes of no confidence until the approval of Bulgaria's accession to the Eurozone in July 2025. The coalition remained in opposition and supported the anti-government protests that broke out later that year.

Following the resignation of the Zhelyazkov government and the scheduling of the snap 2026 election, the coalition announced it would include younger and protest-affiliated MP candidates in their electoral lists. There were disagreements within the alliance, however following negotiations its member parties agreed to retain the coalition. One particular disagreement was whether to include Lorer and Bozhankov as MP candidates, with the parties ultimately agreeing to exclude both. Following the election the co-leaders of DaB proposed merging the three parties of the coalition into a single center-right entity. Nikolai Denkov from PP rejected the idea due to PP's centrist positions. He further commented that there were ongoing discussions on whether the coalition would form one single parliamentary group or two separate groups in the elected 52nd National Assembly, however he affirmed that the three parties would have a joint candidate for the 2026 presidential election. On 29 April 2026, after a three-hour meeting, it was announced that they would form separate parliamentary groups and it was reaffirmed that they will continue to work together on policy areas and legislative initiatives. Nadezhda Yordanova became the leader of the Democratic Bulgaria parliamentary group, while Nikolai Denkov led the We Continue the Change group.

== Ideology and platform ==
On 3 March 2023, Bulgarian Liberation Day, PP–DB unveiled their slogan "There is a Way" and called for Bulgarians to come together to fight for change, proposing five steps that would ensure a "good European life for all Bulgarians":

- Joining the Eurozone in 2023
- Joining the Schengen area in 2023
- Investing millions into regional development, including especially strengthening farms
- Diversifying Bulgaria's energy supply
- Guaranteeing quality healthcare and education for all Bulgarians

Tagesschau described the PP–DB coalition as liberal-conservative, anti-corruption, and Atlanticist.

In their joint declaration, the coalition laid out their main policy proposals in 13 points, including:

- Equal rights for all Bulgarian citizens
- Judicial reform and equality before the law
- Improving conditions for development of private business
- Lowering carbon emissions and implementing environmental protection
- Working towards energy independence
- Further integration with the European Union and NATO and joining the Schengen Area and the Eurozone

== Composition ==
=== Members and Structure ===
The coalition was registered ahead of the 2023 election and originally included six parties (PP, DSB, DaB!, Volt, SEK and ZD) In addition, former BSP MP Yavor Bozhankov led the list in Gabrovo.

On 26 May, Radostin Vasiliev, leader of Strong Bulgaria and nominally a PP MP, announced that he would be leaving the PP–DB group in order to become an independent, due to his frustration with internal corruption and the recent government deal with GERB-SDS.

On 15 April 2024, the Green Movement left PP–DB. On 24 April 2024, SEK also left PP–DB.

Prior to the October 2024 election, Volt left the coalition following reports that DB pushed for them to be excluded.

Party	Leader	Ideology	Position	2023 MPs	Jun 2024 MPs	2024 MEPs	Oct 2024 MPs	2026 MPs
PP	Kiril Petkov; Assen Vassilev	Liberalism; Anti-corruption	Centre	36 / 240 (Note: During the term of the 49th National Assembly Radostin Vasilev left the PP-DB parliamentary group and founded MECh.)	22 / 240	2 / 17	19 / 240	16 / 240
DaB!	Bozhidar Bozhanov; Ivaylo Mirchev	Liberalism; Anti-corruption	Centre to centre-right	13 / 240	9 / 240	0 / 17	12 / 240	13 / 240
DSB	Atanas Atanasov	Conservatism; Conservative liberalism	Centre-right to right-wing	10 / 240	8 / 240	1 / 17	6 / 240	8 / 240
Volt (Note: This party has left the alliance.)	Nastimir Ananiev	European federalism Social liberalism	Centre to centre-left	1 / 240	0 / 240	0 / 17	Not in alliance	Not in alliance
ZD	Toma Belev	Green politics Environmentalism; Liberalism	Centre to centre-left	3 / 240	Not in alliance (Note: Former ZD members who had left the party ran on PP-DB's lists and were elected to Parliament.)	Not in alliance	Not in alliance (Note: Former ZD members who had left the party ran on PP-DB's lists.)	Not in alliance
SEK	Konstantin Bachiyski	Economic liberalism Burgas regionalism	Centre-right	1 / 240	Not in alliance	Not in alliance	Not in alliance	Not in alliance
OZ	Petya Stavreva	Agrarianism	Centre-right	0 / 240 (Note: Due to later MP resignations, OZ gained an MP during the term of the assembly.)	Not in alliance	Not in alliance	Not in alliance	Not in alliance

=== Affiliated groups ===
Group	Affiliation to PP–DB	Leader	Ideology	Position	Notes
Former BSP faction	Participating in PP–DB regional lists as individual members	Yavor Bozhankov	Pro-Europeanism; Social democracy	Centre-left	Bozhankov was an MP at the time of defection
Dissident Green Movement politicians	Participating in PP–DB regional lists as individual members	Vladislav Panev	Green liberalism Green politics	Centre	Two MPs defected rather than split off, as the rest of the party did
Republicans for Bulgaria (RzB)	Endorsed PP–DB for the 2023 elections	Tsvetan Tsvetanov	Conservatism; Conservative liberalism	Centre-right	0 / 240
Bulgarian Agrarian National Union (BZNS)	Political party that officially endorsed the PP–DB list	Ilya Zyumbilev	Agrarianism	Centre	0 / 240
Dignity of United People (DEN)	Political party that officially endorsed the PP–DB list	Naiden Zelenogorski	Liberal conservatism Liberalism	Centre-right	0 / 240
Spasi Sofia	A political group based in Sofia which endorsed the coalition. Individual members may be part of the regional lists	Borislav Bonev	Sofia regionalism Anti-corruption	Centre	—N/a
Justice For All	A non-governmental organisation which endorsed the coalition	Bilyana Gyaruva-Vegertseder	Judicial reform Anti-corruption	Single-issue	—N/a
For Good	A charity organisation which endorsed the coalition	Collective leadership	Children's rights	None	—N/a
Listen to Yourself	A public organisation for deaf and blind people that endorsed the coalition	Collective leadership	Sign language promotion Deaf and blind interests	None	—N/a
Center for Creative Justice Razgrad	A support group against domestic violence and for legal support based in Razgrad which endorsed the alliance	Dimo Borisov	Anti-domestic violence Judicial reform	None	—N/a
Three Women Foundation	A charity organisation which endorsed the alliance	Collective Leadership	None	None	—N/a
Team for Sofia	A public organisation based in Sofia which endorsed the list	Collective leadership	Sofia regionalism Technocracy	Big tent	—N/a

== Election results ==
=== National Assembly ===
Election	Votes	%	Seats	+/−	Government
2023	621,069	23.54 (#2)	64 / 240	New	Coalition
Jun 2024	307,849	14.33 (#3)	39 / 240	▼25	Snap election
Oct 2024	346,063	14.20 (#2)	36 / 240	▼3	Opposition
2026	408,845	12.62 (#3)	37 / 240	▲1	Opposition

=== European Parliament ===
Election	List leader	Votes	%	Seats	+/–	EP Group
2024	Nikola Minchev	290,865	14.45 (#3)	3 / 17	New	RE / EPP

=== President ===
Election	Candidate	First round			Second round		
Election	Candidate	Votes	%	Rank	Votes	%	Result
2026	Andrey Gyurov	486,232	31.95	2nd	750,251	39.48	2nd
