= Anna Bodakova =

Bulgarian politician (born 2003)

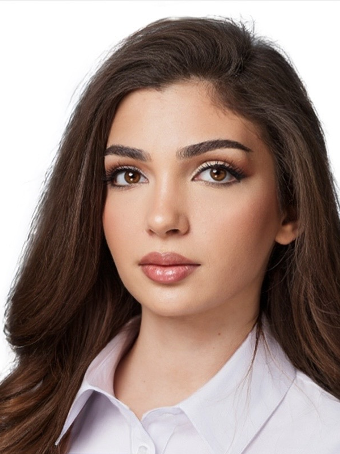
- Bodakova in 2026

Member of the National Assembly
- Incumbent
- Assumed office 30 April 2026
- Constituency: 24th MMC

Personal details
- Born: 1 March 2003 (age 23)
- Party: Yes, Bulgaria!
- Parents: Marin Bodakov (father); Zornitsa Hristova (mother)

Anna Marinova Bodakova (Bulgarian: Анна Маринова Бодакова; born 1 March 2003) is a Bulgarian politician serving as a member of the National Assembly since 2026. She was the youngest member elected in the 2026 parliamentary election. She is the daughter of Marin Bodakov and Zornitsa Hristova.
