= 2026 Bulgarian parliamentary election =

- 19 April 2026
- All 240 seats in the National Assembly; 121 seats needed for a majority
- Turnout: 50.70% (▲11.89pp)
Party	Leader	Vote %	Seats	+/–
PB	Rumen Radev (Note: Radev was the lead candidate and unofficial leader of the coalition, which is de jure led by five co-chairs: Galab Donev, Dimitar Stoyanov, Elena Noneva, Todor Barbolov, and Atanas Kalchev)	43.91	131	New
GERB–SDS	Boyko Borisov	13.18	39	−27
PP–DB	Assen Vassilev (Note: Joint leadership of Assen Vassilev, Ivaylo Mirchev, Bozhidar Bozhanov, and Atanas Atanasov)	12.42	37	+1
DPS	Delyan Peevski	7.01	21	−8
Revival	Kostadin Kostadinov	4.19	12	−21
This lists parties that won seats. See the complete results below.
Results by constituency
Prime Minister before	Prime Minister after
Andrey Gurov (caretaker); Independent (Gyurov Government)	Rumen Radev; PB (Radev government)

Parliamentary elections were held in Bulgaria on 19 April 2026 to elect 240 members of the National Assembly. The vote was triggered by the resignation of the Zhelyazkov Government on 11 December 2025 following widespread anti-corruption protests. It marked the country's seventh snap election since April 2021, the result of a five-year political crisis in Bulgaria. Key campaign issues included political corruption, the cost of living, foreign electoral interference, and allegations of vote buying.

The political scene was shifted significantly by the January 2026 resignation of President Rumen Radev, who entered parliamentary politics by forming the centre-left populist Progressive Bulgaria (PB) coalition. Radev campaigned on a platform to dismantle the oligarchic system. The pro-European conservative GERB–SDS and the liberal We Continue the Change – Democratic Bulgaria (PP–DB) entered the race as the largest established blocs.

In an election that saw an increase in voter turnout at 51%, PB obtained a landslide victory with 44% of the vote. This resulted in an absolute majority of seats, which observers suggested could resolve the prolonged political crisis. Most other parties lost seats, and nearly 20% of the total vote went to parties that failed to meet the 4% electoral threshold. While PP–DB gained one seat, GERB–SDS lost half of its support and the Movement for Rights and Freedoms (DPS) recorded its weakest result since 1994. Moreover, the Bulgarian Socialist Party (BSP)-led BSP – United Left (BSP–OL) alliance finished short of the threshold, leaving it with no seats in the National Assembly for the first time since its foundation in 1991. As a result, the BSP, successor of the Bulgarian Communist Party (BKP), will not be represented in the National Assembly for the first time since the end of Communism in Bulgaria. Every far-right party except Revival (which lost 60% of its seats) also fell out of the Assembly.

Analysts characterized the result as a win for Eurosceptic and pro-Russian sentiment, citing Radev's previous criticism of the European Union (EU) and his willingness to pursue relations with Russia. These positions drew comparisons to the governments of Viktor Orbán in Hungary and Robert Fico in Slovakia, although such characterizations remained a subject of debate. Following his victory, Radev received congratulations from both EU and Russian leadership, and maintained that his administration would pursue a pragmatic foreign policy.

== Background ==
After seven snap elections, the National Assembly failed to form a long-term government as anti-corruption parties made a breakthrough in the April 2021 elections, which started the political crisis, which was further complicated by the entrance of far-right parties. The October 2024 Bulgarian parliamentary election produced a minority government headed by Prime Minister Rosen Zhelyazkov (a member of GERB), comprising GERB–SDS, BSP–OL, and There is Such a People (ITN), with Alliance for Rights and Freedoms (APS), which split from DPS as a result of a rift between two of the party's factions, supporting the government in confidence votes; however, as a result of a ruling by the Constitutional Court of Bulgaria in March 2025, the far-right Velichie entered the National Assembly, bringing down the coalition to exactly the minimum 121 seats compared to the 119 seats held by the opposition.

Following DPS – New Beginning (DPS–NN) leader Delyan Peevski's commitment to support the government if the recalculation resulted in the loss of the government's majority, Alliance for Rights and Freedoms (APS) withdrew from the government in April 2025 because they refused to support a government with Peevski. Days later, the government survived a no-confidence vote due to Peevski's support, effectively creating a de facto confidence and supply agreement. Since taking office in January 2025, the Zhelyazkov government survived several no-confidence votes, bringing the total to five by September 2025. In December 2025, the Zhelyazkov government resigned after weeks of protests over the 2026 budget and corruption within the government. The Zhelyazkov government's primary commitment had been the country's entry into the eurozone in 2026, which it achieved in 2025 when Bulgaria had its final hurdles cleared and adopted the legal framework to make the entry possible.

As President, Radev took a critical stance on adopting the eurozone and attempted to delay it by calling a referendum, a move described as illegal because the Constitutional Court had already clarified in 2024 that Bulgaria was obliged to adopt the euro by its European treaties that were ratified when it joined the EU. Radev's attempt was rejected by Nataliya Kiselova (the BSP–OL-supported Speaker of the National Assembly of Bulgaria), and the decision was upheld by the Constitutional Court, which Radev sharply criticised. After it was confirmed there would be new elections in 2026, the eighth election of the political crisis, Radev resigned as President to contest the elections, seeking to become Prime Minister and describing his political project as a "powerful political alternative" to return Bulgarians' trust in their state, with "clear rules for everyone".

On 18 February 2026, President Iliana Iotova appointed a caretaker government led by Prime Minister Andrey Gurov, a former member of We Continue the Change (PP) who left PP and the parliament in 2023, and set a parliamentary election to be held on 19 April 2026. Gyurov's government had asked the EU for help to fight off interference from Russia ahead of the election, warning foreign actors were trying to manipulate public opinion through social media networks and propaganda websites. Radev responded by saying his party's likely success in the elections could trigger the "Romanian model", which would lead to annulled elections, such as in the 2024 Romanian presidential election, where a far-right candidate's first place finish in the first round was annulled by courts citing "foreign interference".

== Electoral system ==
The 240 members of the National Assembly were elected by an open list and proportional representation system from 31 multi-member constituencies ranging in size from four to nineteen seats. The electoral threshold was 4% for all political parties or electoral coalitions, with seats allocated according to the largest remainder method using a Hare quota.

== Political parties ==
=== Parliamentary parties ===
There were nine political party groups represented in the 51st National Assembly.

Name		Ideology	Position	Leader(s)	2024 result	
Name		Ideology	Position	Leader(s)	Votes (%)	Seats
GERB–SDS	GERB–SDS	Conservatism	Centre-right	Boyko Borisov	25.52%	66 / 240
PP–DB	We Continue the Change – Democratic Bulgaria	Liberalism	Centre to centre-right	Assen Vassilev; Ivaylo Mirchev; Bozhidar Bozhanov; Atanas Atanasov	13.75%	36 / 240
Revival	Revival	Ultranationalism	Far-right	Kostadin Kostadinov	12.92%	33 / 240
DPS	Movement for Rights and Freedoms	Minority interests (Turks)	Centre	Delyan Peevski	11.13%	29 / 240
BSP–OL	BSP – United Left	Social democracy	Centre-left	Krum Zarkov	7.32%	19 / 240
APS	Alliance for Rights and Freedoms	Minority interests (Turks)	Centre	Collective leadership	7.24%	19 / 240
ITN	There is Such a People	National conservatism	Right-wing	Slavi Trifonov	6.56%	16 / 240
MECh	Morality, Unity, Honour	Right-wing populism	Far-right	Radostin Vassilev	4.45%	11 / 240
Velichie	Velichie	Bulgarian nationalism	Far-right	Albena Pekova	3.87%	10 / 240

=== Contesting parties and coalitions ===
There were 24 official parties and coalitions that registered lists for the Bulgarian parliamentary election and were present on the ballot for the election.

Parties and coalitions which contested the 2026 Bulgarian parliamentary election
#	Party or coalition			Ideology	Leader	2024 result	
#	Party or coalition			Ideology	Leader	Votes (%)	Seats
1	ITN		There is Such a People	National conservatism Right-wing populism	Slavi Trifonov	6.56%	16 / 240
2	PD		Direct Democracy	Bulgarian nationalism Direct democracy	Petar Klisarov	0.32%	0 / 240
3	Blue Bulgaria	KOD	Conservative Union of the Right	National conservatism Anti-communism	Petar Moskov	1.02%	0 / 240
3	Blue Bulgaria	BDF	Bulgarian Democratic Forum	National conservatism Anti-communism	Zhaklin Toleva	1.02%	0 / 240
3	Blue Bulgaria	DDD	Democratic Action Movement	Liberal conservatism	Stefan Ivanov	1.02%	0 / 240
3	Blue Bulgaria	BND	Bulgarian New Democracy	Liberal conservatism	Valeri Georgiev	1.02%	0 / 240
3	Blue Bulgaria	KB	Conservative Bulgaria	National conservatism	Boris Yachev	1.02%	0 / 240
3	Blue Bulgaria	RDP	Radical-Democratic Party	Social conservatism Anti-communism	Zahari Petrov	1.02%	0 / 240
3	Blue Bulgaria	OZ	United Agrarians	Agrarianism; Liberal conservatism	Georgi Tashev	1.02%	0 / 240
3	Blue Bulgaria	Zlatiya	Zlatiya	Liberal conservatism	Nikolay Popov	DNE	
4	MECh		Morality, Unity, Honour	Anti-corruption; Social conservatism	Radostin Vasilev	4.45%	11 / 240
5	BSP – United Left	BSP	Bulgarian Socialist Party	Social democracy Social conservatism	Krum Zarkov	6.85%	19 / 240
5	BSP – United Left	–	Ecoglasnost	Green politics Environmentalism	Emil Georgiev	6.85%	19 / 240
5	BSP – United Left	Trakiya	Political Club "Trakiya"	Left wing nationalism	Stefan Nachev	6.85%	19 / 240
5	BSP – United Left	ABV	Alternative for Bulgarian Revival	Social democracy Social conservatism	Rumen Petkov	6.85%	19 / 240
5	BSP – United Left	SO	Union for the Fatherland	Left-wing nationalism	Vasil Tochkov	6.85%	19 / 240
5	BSP – United Left	BSDE	Bulgarian Social Democracy – EuroLeft	Social democracy	Aleksandr Tomov	6.85%	19 / 240
5	BSP – United Left	KPB	Communist Party of Bulgaria	Marxism–Leninism	Alexander Paunov	6.85%	19 / 240
5	BSP – United Left	Podem	Rise	Left-wing nationalism	Svetoslav Mandikov	6.85%	19 / 240
5	BSP – United Left	DSH	Movement for Social Humanism	Progressivism	Alexander Radoslavov	6.85%	19 / 240
5	BSP – United Left	ESI	European Security and Integration	Minority interests (Roma)	Toma Tomov	6.85%	19 / 240
5	BSP – United Left	M21	Movement 21	Social democracy	Tatyana Doncheva	6.85%	19 / 240
6	ISI		People's Party "Truth and Only the Truth"	Conspiracy theorism Anti-establishment	Ventsislav Angelov	0.10%	0 / 240
7	PP–DB	PP	We Continue the Change	Liberalism; Anti-corruption	Assen Vassilev	13.75%	36 / 240
7	PP–DB	DSB	Democrats for a Strong Bulgaria	Conservatism; Anti-communism	Atanas Atanasov	13.75%	36 / 240
7	PP–DB	DB	Yes, Bulgaria!	Liberalism; Anti-corruption	Ivaylo Mirchev; Bozhidar Bozhanov	13.75%	36 / 240
8	Revival		Revival	Ultranationalism; Right-wing populism	Kostadin Kostadinov	12.92%	33 / 240
9	My Bulgaria	ZP	Green Party	Green politics	Mariya Dragomiretskaya	DNP	
9	My Bulgaria	NS	New Power	Bulgarian nationalism	Anton Sirakov	DNP	
9	My Bulgaria	BNDS	BNDS "Entire Bulgaria"	Bulgarian nationalism	Georgi Valchev	DNP	
9	My Bulgaria	MSB	My Country Bulgaria	Left-wing nationalism Anti-Western sentiment	Ivaylo Drazhev	0.11%	0 / 240
10	DNK		Movement of Non-Partisan Candidates	Left-wing populism Anti-establishment	Boyko Mladenov; Boyko Nikiforov; Ognyan Boyukliev	DNP	
11	Alliance for Rights and Freedoms	APS	Alliance for Rights and Freedoms	Minority interests (Turkish minority); Liberalism	Taner Ali; Dimitar Nikolov; Sevim Ali; Hayri Sadakov	7.24%	19 / 240
11	Alliance for Rights and Freedoms	ZNS	Agrarian People's Union	Agrarianism; Liberal conservatism	Rumen Yonchev	7.24%	19 / 240
12	Anti-Corruption Bloc	ZD	Green Movement	Green politics Social liberalism	Toma Belev; Daniela Bozhinova	DNP	
12	Anti-Corruption Bloc	SEK	Middle European Class	Economic liberalism Regionalism (Burgas)	Konstantin Bachiyski	DNP	
12	Anti-Corruption Bloc	Edinenie	Unification	Liberalism; Anti-corruption	Ivan Hristanov	DNP	
12	Anti-Corruption Bloc	NI		Liberalism; Pro-Europeanism	Maria Kapon	DNP	
13	NB		Defiant Bulgaria	Left-wing populism Anti-corruption	Korneliya Ninova	DNE	
14	Velichie		Velichie	Right-wing populism Bulgarian nationalism	Albena Pekova	3.87%	10 / 240
15	GERB–SDS	GERB	GERB	Social conservatism Pro-Europeanism	Boyko Borisov	25.52%	66 / 240
15	GERB–SDS	SDS	SDS	Christian democracy Anti-communism	Rumen Hristov	25.52%	66 / 240
15	GERB–SDS	DG	George's Day Movement	National conservatism Bulgarian nationalism	Lyuben Dilov Jr.	25.52%	66 / 240
16	Third of March	ZVB	For a Great Bulgaria	Bulgarian nationalism	Kamen Popov	DNP	
16	Third of March	BOG	Prosperity-Unity-Construction	Anti-establishment; E-governance	Ivan Gaberov	DNP	
16	Third of March	PBZ	Party of Bulgarian Women	Women's issues	Vesela Draganova	DNP	
16	Third of March	3M	Third of March	Bulgarian nationalism	Tihomir Atanasov	DNЕ	
17	DPS		Movement for Rights and Freedoms	Minority interests (Turkish); Liberalism	Delyan Peevski	11.13%	29 / 240
18	Natsiya		Nation	Ultranationalism; Hard Euroscepticism	Kiril Gumnerov	DNP	
19	BM		Bulgaria Can	Bulgarian nationalism Social conservatism	Kuzman Iliev	DNP	
20	Siyanie	Volt	Volt Bulgaria	Social liberalism Pro-Europeanism	Nastimir Ananiev	DNP	
20	Siyanie	ONB	Society for a New Bulgaria	Conservatism; Bulgarian nationalism	Margarit Mitsev	DNP	
20	Siyanie	Siyanie	Siyanie	Anti-corruption	Nikolay Popov	DNE	
21	Progressive Bulgaria	PDS	Political Movement "Social Democrats"	Social democracy	Elena Noneva	BSP–UL	
21	Progressive Bulgaria	SD	Social Democratic Party	Social democracy	Todor Barbolov	DNP	
21	Progressive Bulgaria	DNN	Movement for Our People	Localism	Anton Kalchev	DNP	
21	Progressive Bulgaria	VMRO–BND	VMRO – Bulgarian National Movement	National conservatism	Krasimir Karakachanov	DNP	
21	Progressive Bulgaria	PB	Progressive Bulgaria	Anti-corruption	Galab Donev; Dimitar Stoyanov	DNE	
22	Resistance	Sŭprotiva	Resistance	Left-wing nationalism Social conservatism	Georgi Georgiev	0.07	0 / 240
22	Resistance	KOY	Competence, Responsibility, Truth	Anti-establishment	Svetozar Saev	0.08	0 / 240
23	BnZ		Party of the Greens	Green politics Left-wing nationalism	Vladimir Nikolov	0.19	0 / 240
24	GN		People's Voice	Right-wing populism Liberal conservatism	Svetoslav Vitkov	0.29	0 / 240

== Campaign ==
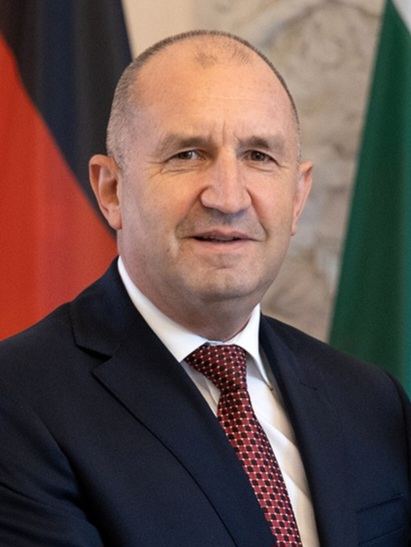
President Radev in September 2025

In January 2026, Radev resigned as President of Bulgaria, forming Progressive Bulgaria (PB), a centre-left party, to contest the election. Among the significant issues of Bulgaria that were key to the campaign were a cost of living crisis, as well as corruption and vote buying, as Radev supported the anti-corruption protests and promised to get rid of the "oligarchic governance model". At campaign rallies, he vowed to "remove the corrupt, oligarchic model of governance from political power." Radev launched the electoral programme of PB on 19 March, the eve of the beginning of the official campaign period. In Radev's speech, he vowed to dismantle the oligarchic system that controlled state institution and pledged to prevent oligarchs from accessing public finance, promising to free the private sector from racketeering. 4,786 candidates, of whom 3,347 men and 1,439 women, ran for the National Assembly. According to preliminary data from the Central Electoral Commission (CEC), a total of 6,641,768 Bulgarian citizens were eligible to vote.

The campaign period was dominated with a crackdown on vote buying, with an initial police operation taking place in Haskovo on 18 March resulting in the arrest of three people. On 26 March, the caretaker Minister of the Interior Emil Dechev stated that breaches of election law were between 500% to 600% up compared with the same period before the October 2024 parliamentary election. Further arrests relating to vote buying took place, with a 53-year-old man being arrested on 8 April who was in possession of more than €40,000 and two people being arrested on 9 April who were in possession of €88,720. By 14 April, more than €1 million had been confiscated in operations against vote buying by police. Caretaker Prime Minister Gyurov warned on 15 April that a scheme to buy votes using counterfeit euro banknotes was being prepared. A routine stop on 16 April upon a candidate driving a car resulted in the reveal of lists of names alongside a sum of euro banknotes, while a police operation upon four addresses on 17 April in Varna resulted in a seizure of €200,000. After the campaign period concluded on 17 April, election silence was imposed from 18 April to election day on 19 April. The Ministry of Interior revealed after the closure of polls on 19 April that DPS and GERB–SDS ranked first and second in official reports of vote buying, respectively generating 631 and 318 reports.

== Opinion polls ==
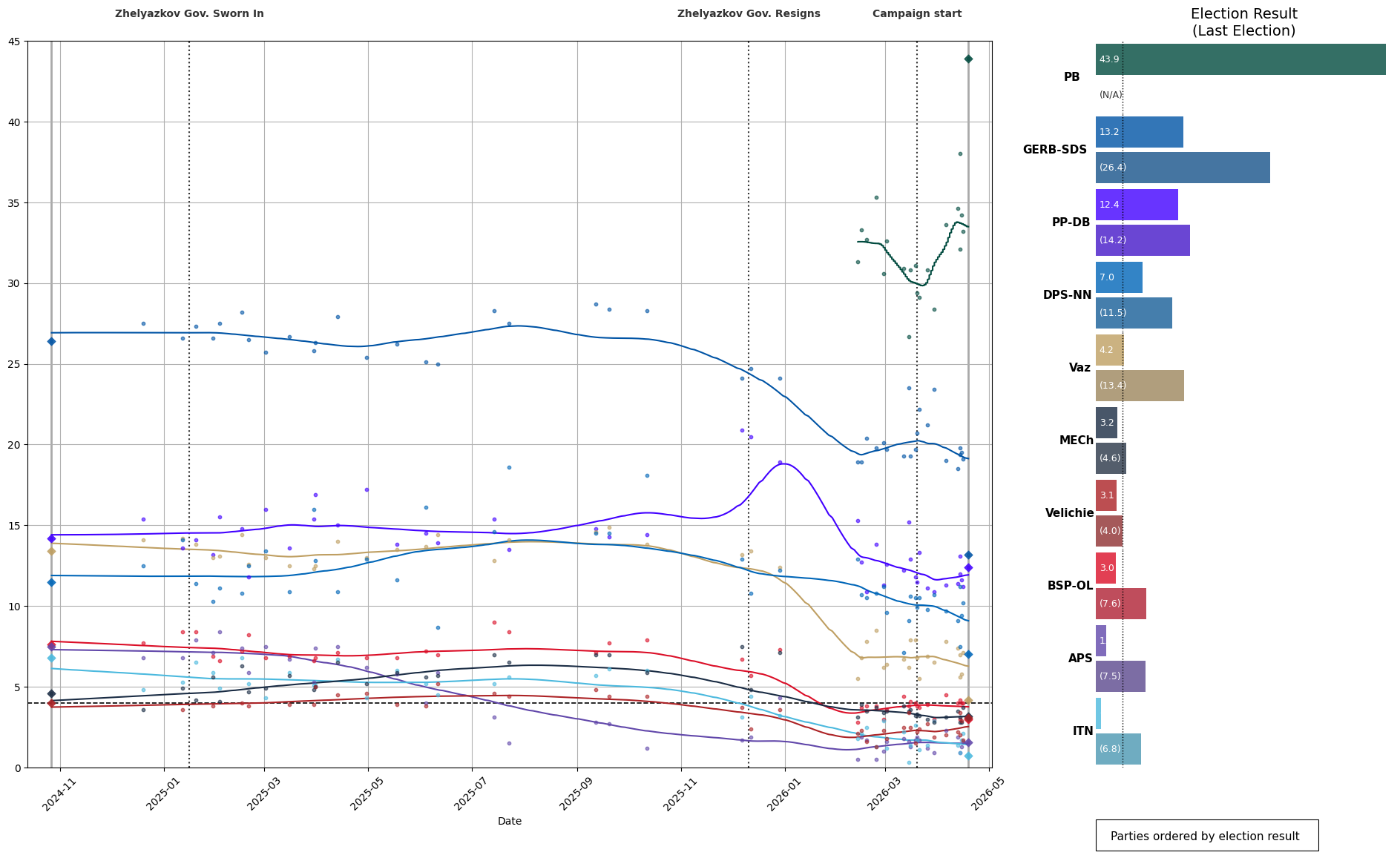
Local regression of polls conducted, excluding "none of the above"

Colour key

Exit poll

Polling firm	Fieldwork date	Sample	GERB–SDS	PP–DB	Vaz.	DPS	BSP–OL	APS	ITN	MECh	Veli.	SB	PB (Note: Presented before 2 March 2026 as "Rumen Radev's Party/Formation")	Siy.	Others	NOTA	Lead
2026 election	19 Apr 2026	—N/a	13.2; 39	12.4; 37	4.2; 12	7.0; 21	3.0; 0	1.5; 0	0.7; 0	3.2; 0	3.1; 0	0.6; 0	43.9; 131	2.8; 0	2.9	1.5	30.7
MarketLinks	19 Apr 2026 (20:45)	n/a	15.6; 47	13.4; 40	5.1; 15	7.5; 22	3.7; 0	1.3; 0	2.0; 0	3.1; 0	3.0; 0	0.7; 0	39.1; 116	3.3; 0	2.2; 0	–	23.5
Myara	19 Apr 2026	n/a	14.8; 42	13.1; 37	5.3; 15	9.2; 26	4.0; 11	1.7; 0	1.5; 0	3.2; 0	3.4; 0	0.5; 0	38.7; 109	2.4; 0	2.2; 0	–	23.9
MarketLinks	19 Apr 2026 (19:00)	n/a	15.4; 44	13.6; 39	5.1; 14	7.5; 21	4.1; 12	1.3; 0	2.0; 0	3.2; 0	3.0; 0	0.7; 0	38.9; 110	3.2; 0	2.0; 0	–	23.5
Alpha Research	19 Apr 2026	n/a	16.2; 46	14.3; 40	4.9; 14	8.4; 24	4.1; 11	2.8; 0	1.0; 0	2.9; 0	2.7; 0	0.8; 0	37.5; 105	2.6; 0	1.8; 0	–	21.3
Trend	19 Apr 2026	n/a	15.1; 43	13.3; 38	5.0; 14	8.1; 23	4.2; 11	2.1; 0	1.6; 0	2.7; 0	2.4; 0	0.7; 0	39.2; 111	3.1; 0	1.8; 0	–	24.1
Trend	13–16 Apr 2026	1,004	19.1	11.2	7.1	10.2	4.0	1.6	2.1	3.7	1.7	1.0	33.2	3.9	1.2	–	14.1
Gallup	8–16 Apr 2026	803	21.0	10.7	6.8	10.5	4.0	1.0	3.0	2.8	2.0	0.8	31.6	3.2	2.6	2.8 (Note: This poll reported the percentage respondents that do not support any party, or are undecided; however, the data was recalculated to exclude these percentages.)	10.6
Alpha Research	13–15 Apr 2026	1,003	19.5	11.6	5.8	9.4	4.0	1.3	1.7	2.8	2.9	1.0	34.2	3.2	2.6	–	14.7
MarketLinks (Note: The presented data in this row is a forecast prepared based on the median of four forecasting models, based on data from MarketLinks' electoral pre-election sentiment surveys for the 2021–2025 period.)	7–14 Apr 2026	1,003	19.8; 57	13.1; 37	5.6; 16	7.5; 21	3.0; 0	–	–	3.1; 0	3.4; 0	–	38.0; 109	3.1; 0	3.4; 0	–	18.2
CAM	3–14 Apr 2026	1,011	19.4	12.0	7.0	11.2	4.2	0.9	0.9	2.8	2.0	1.1	32.1	2.1	–	–	12.7
Myara	4–13 Apr 2026	1,002	18.5	11.4	7.4	9.1	4.0	1.9	1.4	3.5	2.2	–	34.6	3.6	2.4	–	16.1
Sova Harris	2–6 Apr 2026	800	19.0	11.2	7.8	9.7	4.5	2.3	–	3.1	2.0	–	33.6	3.1	3.7 (Note: This poll presents data for "Others" and "None of the above" (NOTA) as a cumulative percentage; as a result, overall figures do not account for NOTA exclusion.)		14.6
Gallup	20–30 Mar 2026	820	23.4	10.9	6.5	10.7	3.0	0.9	2.9	2.8	1.9	0.9	28.4	3.0	4.7	2.6	5.0
Alpha Research	19–26 Mar 2026	1,000	21.2	11.1	6.9	9.8	3.9	1.2	1.4	3.0	2.7	1.6	30.8	2.8	3.6	–	9.6
MarketLinks	17–21 Mar 2026	1,008	22.2	13.3	5.5	10.5	3.7	1.7	1.1	3.2	2.4	2.0	29.1	2.0	3.3	16.1	6.9
20 Mar 2026			Official start of the election campaign.														
Alpha Research	12–20 Mar 2026	1,000	20.7	11.5	6.8	9.9	3.8	1.9	1.7	3.3	2.2	1.5	29.4	2.4	4.9	–	8.7
Trend	13–19 Mar 2026	1,001	19.7	11.8	7.9	10.5	4.0	1.7	2.6	3.2	1.5	–	31.1	2.9	3.1	–	11.4
Myara	7–16 Mar 2026	809	19.3	12.9	7.9	10.6	4.1	1.3	1.4	3.6	2.5	–	30.8	2.3	3.3	–	11.5
MarketLinks	7–15 Mar 2026	1,006	23.5	15.2	6.2	9.1	3.8	1.6	0.3	3.5	3.4	1.5	26.7	1.3	3.9	1.8	3.2
Sova Harris	7–12 Mar 2026	1,000	19.3	12.2	6.7	7.1	4.4	1.8	2.2	3.8	2.5	–	30.9	2.9	6.2	–	11.6
Alpha Research	23 Feb–2 Mar 2026	1,000	19.7	12.6	6.4	9.6	3.6	1.6	1.2	3.5	1.8	1.5	32.6	–	5.9	–	12.9
Gallup	10–28 Feb 2026	800	20.1	11.3	6.2	11.2	3.0	1.0	2.9	3.4	2.3	0.9	30.6	–	7.1	2.7	10.5
CAM	17–24 Feb 2026	1,010	19.8	13.8	8.5	10.8	3.8	0.5	1.3	3.7	1.3	–	35.3	–	1.2	1.5	15.5
Trend	12–18 Feb 2026	1,002	20.4	10.9	7.8	10.5	3.8	1.7	2.5	3.6	1.6	–	32.7	–	4.5	–	12.3
Myara	9–15 Feb 2026	812	18.9	12.7	6.8	10.7	3.7	1.9	2.1	3.9	2.3	–	33.3	–	3.7	1.5	14.4
MarketLinks	7–13 Feb 2026	1,019	18.9	15.3	5.5	12.9	2.8	0.5	1.8	3.1	2.1	–	31.3	–	4.0	1.8	12.7
23 Jan 2026			President Radev's resignation is accepted by the Constitutional Court.														
19 Jan 2026			President Rumen Radev announces his intention to resign his post and enter active politics.														
MarketLinks	18–29 Dec 2025	1,008	24.1	18.9	12.4	12.2	7.3	4.3	3.2	7.1	3.6	–	–	–	6.7	3.3	5.2
Alpha Research	5–12 Dec 2025	1,009	24.7	20.5	13.4	10.8	5.7	1.9	4.4	4.8	2.4	–	–	–	11.4	–	4.5
11 Dec 2025			The Zhelyazkov government resigns.														
MarketLinks	3–7 Dec 2025	1,009	24.1	20.9	13.2	12.9	6.7	1.7	3.1	7.5	3.7	–	–	–	6.2	–	3.2
Gallup	29 Sep–12 Oct 2025	904	28.3	14.4	13.8	18.1	7.9	1.2	6.0	5.9	4.4	–	–	–	3.2	–	10.2
Trend	13–20 Sep 2025	1,004	28.4	14.3	14.9	14.5	7.7	2.7	6.1	7.0	4.4	–	–	–	6.9	–	13.5
Myara	4–12 Sep 2025	802	28.7	14.8	14.6	14.5	7.1	2.8	5.7	7.0	4.8	–	–	–	6.2	–	13.9
Gallup	11–23 Jul 2025	800	27.5	13.5	14.1	18.6	8.4	1.5	5.6	6.5	4.4	–	–	–	6.1 (Note: Including 1.9% undecided)	–	8.9
Alpha Research	7–14 Jul 2025	1,000	28.3	15.4	12.8	14.6	9.0	3.1	5.2	7.0	4.6	–	–	–	10.0 (Note: Including 6.4% undecided)	–	12.9
Sova Harris	9–11 Jun 2025	1,000	25.0	13.9	14.4	8.7	7.0	5.9	4.5	5.7	5.2	–	–	–	9.7	–	10.6
Gallup	28 May–4 Jun 2025	1,204	25.1	14.5	13.7	16.1	7.2	4.0	5.2	5.6	3.8	–	–	–	4.8	2.3	9.0
Trend	12–18 May 2025	1,001	26.2	13.8	13.5	11.6	6.8	5.8	6.0	5.9	3.9	1.1	–	–	5.4	–	12.4
MarketLinks	18–30 Apr 2025	1,010	25.4	17.2	13.0	12.9	6.8	6.2	4.3	5.2	4.6	–	–	–	4.5	2.9	7.0
17 Apr 2025			DPS–NN supports the government.														
Myara	3–13 Apr 2025	807	27.9	15.0	14.0	10.9	7.1	7.5	6.7	6.5	4.5	–	–	–	5.2	–	12.9
30 Mar 2025			APS withdraws its support from the government.														
MarketLinks	22–30 Mar 2025	1,004	26.3	16.9	12.5	12.8	6.8	7.4	5.1	5.0	5.0	–	–	–	2.1	2.5	9.4
Gallup	19–30 Mar 2025	846	25.8	15.4	12.3	16.0	6.6	5.3	5.1	4.8	3.9	–	–	–	5.1	–	9.6
Trend	10–16 Mar 2025	1,020	26.7	13.6	12.5	10.9	6.9	6.7	5.9	5.7	3.9	1.1	–	–	6.1	–	13.1
13 Mar 2025			The Constitutional Court orders a seat re-calculation and Velichie re-enters the National Assembly.														
MarketLinks	22 Feb–2 Mar 2025	1,025	25.7	16.0	13.0	13.4	6.8	7.5	4.3	4.9	–	–	–	–	8.3	2.7	9.7
Gallup	13–20 Feb 2025	841	26.5	11.8	12.6	12.5	8.2	5.9	5.2	4.7	3.8	–	–	–	5.0	–	13.9
Myara	6–16 Feb 2025	803	28.2	14.8	14.4	10.8	7.2	7.4	6.8	6.3	4.0	–	–	–	5.9	–	13.4
MarketLinks	25 Jan–3 Feb 2025	1,008	27.5	15.5	13.1	11.0	6.6	8.4	4.9	4.1	–	–	–	–	8.9	2.7	12.3
Trend	24–30 Jan 2025	1,003	26.6	13.2	13.0	10.3	6.9	7.1	5.9	5.6	3.8	1.2	–	–	6.4	–	13.4
Alpha Research	15–20 Jan 2025	1,000	27.3	14.1	13.8	11.4	8.4	7.9	6.5	4.2	–	–	–	–	4.9	–	13.2
16 Jan 2025			The Zhelyazkov government is sworn in.														
Gallup	8–12 Jan 2025	800	26.6	13.6	14.2	14.1	8.4	6.8	5.3	4.9	3.6	–	–	–	2.5	–	12.4
MarketLinks	12–20 Dec 2024	1,007	27.5	15.4	14.1	12.5	7.7	6.8	4.8	3.6	–	–	–	–	7.6	2.4	12.1
October 2024 election	27 Oct 2024	—N/a	25.5; 66	13.8; 36	12.9; 33	11.1; 29	7.3; 19	7.2; 19	6.6; 17	4.5; 11	3.9; 10	1.0; 0	–	–	3.3	3.3	11.7

== Results ==
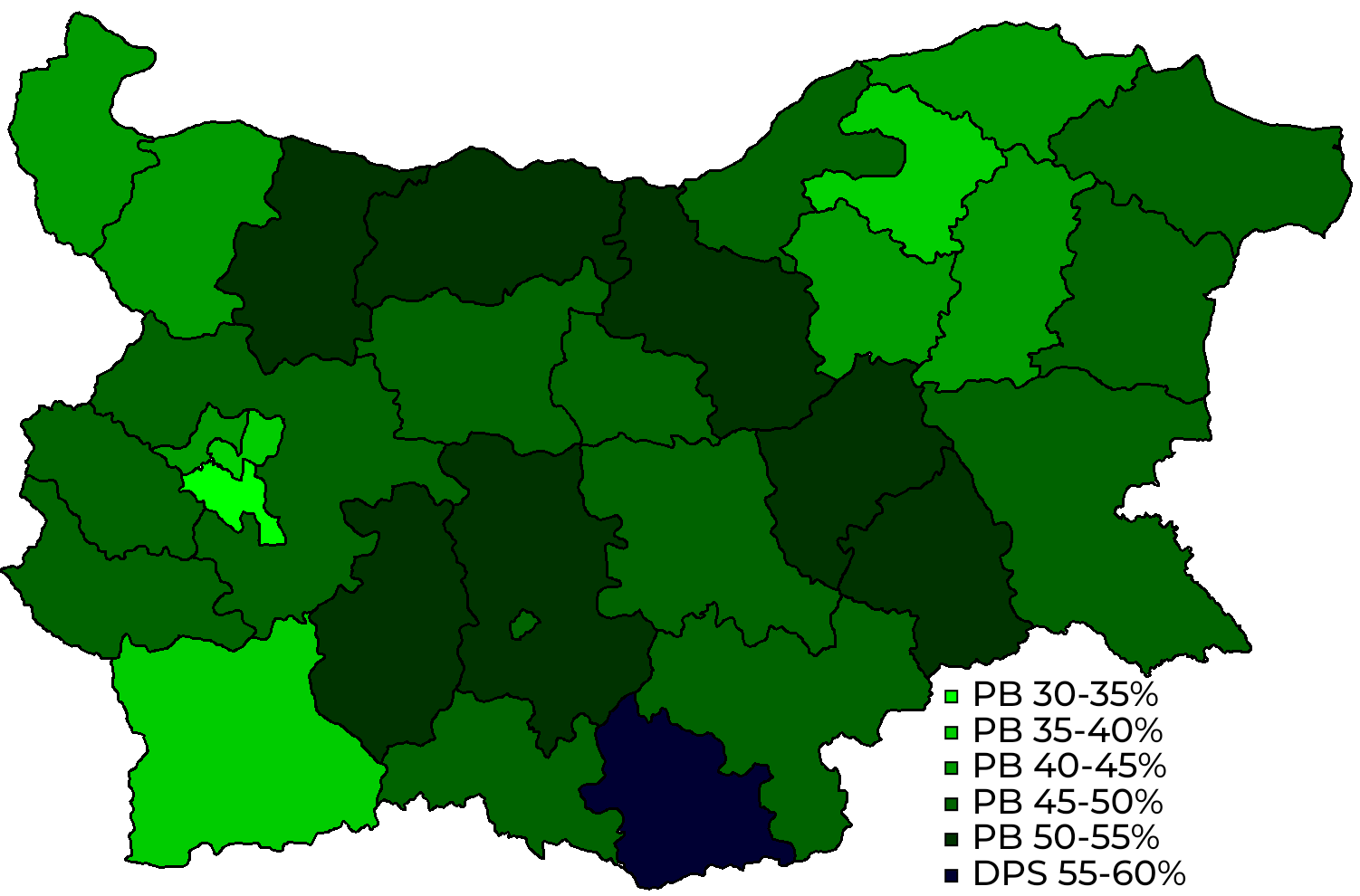
Results of the election showed that PB was the most voted party in all provinces of Bulgaria except Kardzhali .

PB was the largest party with 44.6% of the vote, followed by GERB/SDS with 13.3%, PP–DP with 12.6%, DPS with 7.1%, and Revival with 4.3%. Among other main parties, MECh, Velichie, and BSP–OL respectively obtained 3.2%, 3.1%, and 3.0%, narrowly below the 4% threshold. In terms of seats, PB obtained an absolute majority with 131 seats, followed by GERB/SDS with 39, PP–DP with 37, DPS with 21, and Revival with 12. Although PB obtained a larger than expected win, the final polls were relatively accurate and within (or close to) the margin of error as Market Links, Alpha Research, Myara, Sova Harris, Trend, CAM, and Gallup respectively deviated by an average of 2.79%, 3.14%, 3.24%, 3.64%, 3.71%, 4.01%, and 4.83% from the election results.

Party	Votes	%	Seats	+/–
Progressive Bulgaria	1,444,920	43.91	131	New
GERB–SDS	433,755	13.18	39	−27
We Continue the Change – Democratic Bulgaria	408,846	12.42	37	+1
Movement for Rights and Freedoms	230,693	7.01	21	−8
Revival	137,940	4.19	12	−21
Morality, Unity, Honour	104,506	3.18	0	–11
Velichie	100,572	3.06	0	–10
BSP – United Left	97,753	2.97	0	–19
Siyanie	93,559	2.84	0	New
Alliance for Rights and Freedoms	50,759	1.54	0	–19
There is Such a People	23,861	0.73	0	–17
Anti-Corruption Bloc	18,999	0.58	0	0
Blue Bulgaria	18,640	0.57	0	0
Bulgaria Can	17,263	0.52	0	0
Direct Democracy	10,032	0.30	0	New
Nation	9,804	0.30	0	New
Movement of Non-Partisan Candidates	9,761	0.30	0	New
Nepokorna Bulgaria	6,221	0.19	0	New
People's Voice	4,665	0.14	0	New
People's Party "Truth and Only the Truth"	4,392	0.13	0	0
My Bulgaria	4,358	0.13	0	0
Party of the Greens	3,027	0.09	0	0
Resistance	1,897	0.06	0	New
Third of March	1,840	0.06	0	New
Independents	2,093	0.06	0	New
None of the above	50,733	1.54	–	–
Total	3,290,889	100.00	240	0
Valid votes	3,290,889	97.94		
Invalid/blank votes	69,222	2.06		
Total votes	3,360,111	100.00		
Registered voters/turnout	6,627,747	50.70		
Source: Central Electoral Commission

Vote share
PB	43.91%
GERB–SDS	13.18%
PP–DB	12.42%
DPS	7.01%
Revival	4.19%
MECh	3.18%
Velichie	3.06%
BSP–OL	2.97%
Siyanie	2.84%
APS	1.54%
Others	5.70%

Seat share
PB	54.58%
GERB–SDS	16.25%
PP–DB	15.42%
DPS	8.75%
Revival	5.00%

=== Turnout ===
According to various exit polls, voter turnout at 19:00 was respectively estimated at 46.8% by Alpha Research and 44.9% by Myara. Final turnout exit polls showed that it was respectively estimated at 51.3% by Market Links, 48.8% by Alpha Research, 48.5% by Myara, and 48.0% by Trend. Overall, final turnout slightly exceeded 50%.

Turnout (only within Bulgaria, excluding voters from abroad)
Constituency	11:00	16:00	Overall
Blagoevgrad	11.33%	34.04%	48.78%
Burgas	10.51%	35.37%	49.96%
Varna	11.20%	35.11%	50.88%
Veliko Tarnovo	14.20%	36.98%	49.82%
Vidin	16.58%	35.26%	46.11%
Vratsa	17.13%	39.97%	52.95%
Gabrovo	12.67%	36.32%	48.73%
Dobrich	11.97%	30.31%	40.38%
Kardzhali	7.85%	23.34%	29.79%
Kyustendil	12.35%	32.88%	44.17%
Lovech	15.61%	36.98%	49.10%
Montana	16.46%	39.21%	52.11%
Pazardzhik	11.80%	32.07%	45.98%
Pernik	12.31%	38.43%	54.35%
Pleven	13.03%	34.73%	47.41%
Plovdiv-city	8.07%	34.50%	52.17%
Plovdiv-province	11.97%	33.76%	48.13%
Razgrad	12.41%	28.28%	36.86%
Ruse	13.30%	34.46%	45.92%
Silistra	13.96%	32.86%	43.88%
Sliven	10.35%	28.96%	39.79%
Smolyan	15.89%	42.63%	55.50%
Sofia-city 23	11.46%	43.38%	61.76%
Sofia-city 24	8.74%	29.46%	42.14%
Sofia-city 25	12.25%	38.58%	53.29%
Sofia-province	17.07%	34.45%	56.01%
Stara Zagora	14.21%	37.92%	51.13%
Targovishte	12.56%	31.03%	41.41%
Haskovo	14.26%	37.08%	49.28%
Shumen	11.38%	29.51%	38.49%
Yambol	14.88%	36.79%	48.28%
Bulgaria	12.12%	34.63%	51.11%

=== Voter demographics ===
As part of its exit poll, Alpha Research released a demographic breakdown showing that PB won in every age group, including among the 18–30 years old, a group of voters that had become more politically engaged as part of the anti-establishment protests in late 2025.

Voter demographics in percentage
Social group	PB	GERB–SDS	PP–DB	DPS	Vaz.	BSP–OL
Final result	43.9	13.2	12.4	7.0	4.2	3.0
Gender
Men	45	13	13	8	5	3
Women	44	14	12	7	4	4
Age
18–30	42	12	20	7	3	2
30–60	44	14	12	8	5	3
60+	46	13	8	7	4	8
Level of education
Lower education	44	11	2	27	1	4
Secondary education	45	15	15	5	5	4
Higher education	40	13	19	2	4	3
Ethnic group
Bulgarian	46	13	14	1	5	4
Turkish	20	6	5	45	0	1
Roma	15	20	1	30	3	5
Location
Towns and villages	38	9	4	24	3	5
Smaller cities	45	17	10	2	5	5
Larger cities	43	14	14	3	6	4
Sofia	32	14	30	0	5	3

== Aftermath ==
=== Exit polls ===
Exit polls projected Radev's PB coalition to have won the election in a landslide with around 37–39% of the vote, with GERB–SDS falling to around 15% and PP–DB retaining its result of 13% from the last election. The status of some parties was unclear, in particular that of BSP–OL as they were expected to enter the National Assembly but were within the margin of error or just above the threshold. Among the far-right or right-wing populist parties, only Revival was expected to cross the 4% threshold needed to enter the 240-seat parliament. The exit poll by Trend predicted a voter turnout of 43.4% and that six parties could pass the 4% threshold. An updated exit poll by Alpha Research showed that PB was first with 44%, significantly ahead of GERB–SDS at 12.5% and with a turnout of 47%, in what would mark "one of the strongest results by a single party in a generation, sideline a party that has ruled on and off for decades, and may see an end to the instability that has resulted in eight elections in five years."

=== International reactions ===
Following the election, Russia congratulated Radev, welcoming his victory, with Kremlin spokesman Dmitry Peskov saying: "Of course, we are impressed by the statements made by Mr Radev, who won the election, and by some other European leaders regarding their willingness to resolve problems through pragmatic dialogue." Serbian President Aleksandar Vučić was among the first to congratulate Radev on his win. European Commission President Ursula von der Leyen and European Council President António Costa also congratulated Radev, with von der Leyen saying she was looking forward to working with Radev "for the prosperity and security" of Europe. NATO Secretary-General Mark Rutte said he would "look forward to continued cooperation on shared security challenges" with Radev.

Czech MEP Tomáš Zdechovský of KDU–ČSL regretted the results, writing that "Bulgaria has sent a clear — and deeply concerning — signal" and that "Radev, a politician openly critical of support for Ukraine and long seen as sympathetic to Russia, appears to have secured a parliamentary majority. This is no longer just an election result, it is a serious geopolitical shift." Austrian MEP Andreas Schieder of SPÖ expressed disappointment with the results, describing Radev as "the next Putin friend" that would enter the European Council and that the election was a "setback for Europe".

=== Government formation ===
Before an outright majority for PB was reached, analysts speculated on at least two possible options for a majority government, which would bring the country some stability after seven elections in five years, namely one with the pro-EU liberal reformists of PP–DB and one with BSP–OL and the nationalists. In his first remarks after the vote, Radev said that he could find common ground by looking in "one and the same direction" with pro-EU liberal reformists in order to promote anti-corruption and judicial reforms. More specifically, Radev said he was "ready to go with different options so Bulgaria can have a functional and stable government". Radev said that "Bulgaria will make efforts to continue its European path" and that "a strong Bulgaria and strong Europe" needed pragmatism because "Europe has fallen victim to its own ambition to be a moral leader in a world without rules." Ivan Demerdzhiev, former interior minister and candidate from PB, said in an interview with bTV that the party has no intention of leading Bulgaria out of the EU, the eurozone, or NATO.

Before results showed that his party had won an absolute majority, Radev said he was open to a minority government, and told Reuters that his coalition would do "everything possible not to allow us to go [to elections] again" as it was "ruinous for Bulgaria" and were ready to "consider different options so that Bulgaria can have a regular and stable government". As votes were being counted and confirmed an even larger PB's landslide win, Radev hailed it as a "victory of hope", further stating that "PB has won unequivocally – a victory of hope over distrust, a victory of freedom over fear." In turn, Borisov congratulated Radev, cautioning that "winning elections is one thing, governing is another." With 96% of votes counted and PB's landslide win, five parties were set to enter the National Assembly compared with nine of the previous election. As a result of PB's win, Radev is considered the Prime Minister-designate; a former President, he would enter a position that is considered more powerful. In the aftermath, Borislav Sarafov resigned as Bulgaria's acting prosecutor general and Vanya Stefanova became acting Prosecutor General instead.

On 30 April, the first session of the newly elected 52nd National Assembly took place, electing Mihaela Dotsova from PB as speaker of the parliament. Subsequently, President Iliana Iotova held constitutionally-mandated consultations with all parliamentary groups on 5 May.

On 7 May, the first governing mandate was given by President Iotova to Rumen Radev, whose cabinet was elected by the National Assembly on 8 May.

== Analysis ==
=== National Assembly ===
With more than 60% of ballots counted, DPS was above the threshold while BSP–OL was not, with the CEC noting that PB had won about 45% and at least 132 seats, which was a majority in the 240-seat parliament. Final results were expected to be available by 20 April. As turnout exceeded 50%, higher than predicted by exit polls and the highest since April 2021, the electorate was seen as having voted in favour of politicians and parties promising significant changes and anti-corruption measures. Reflecting the electorate's call for changes, Evelina Koleva, a manager at a digital marketing company in Sofia, told Reuters: "There is now an opportunity for the things people have been hoping to see change to actually become visible." Addressing the cost of living, which was one of the election's key issues, Tihomir Bezlov, a senior fellow at the Centre for the Study of Democracy in Sofia, said: "The country's main challenge is the economic crisis and the demographic crisis ... There do not seem to be many ideas in the winning camp on either of these issues."

In what was seen as a significant loss for Boyko Borisov and the centre-right coalition of GERB–SDS, which had dominated the 2010s, Radev claimed an "uncontested victory". The incoming parliament would be less fragmented, with a significant decline in representation for parties associated with Borisov, and the new majority signalled an end to the prolonged political fragmentation that hindered the formation of stable governments in Bulgaria. Radev's PB received 44% of the vote and won an outright majority of seats, the first time a party or alliance has had a majority in the National Assembly since 1997. GERB–SDS lost half of its support, receiving 13% of the vote, while PP–DB received 12% of the vote, barely changing its result from the last election.

DPS, the Turkish minority party, had its weakest result since 1994, while their splinter party APS lost all 19 seats. Nearly all far-right or right-wing populist parties did not cross the 4% election threshold, including Velichie, ITN (a party that rose in prominence in the previous series of elections), and Morality, Unity, Honour (MECh), which were present in the previous National Assembly. The notable exception was Revival, which marginally crossed the threshold and lost more than half of its seats. The election also marked the first time in Bulgaria's modern history in which the BSP (the legal successor of the BKP and the main political party behind Radev's rise to prominence and that supported his first presidential bid) failed to enter the National Assembly. Alongside GERB and ITN, the BSP was part of the previous governing coalition, with the electorate voting against these parties, all of which suffered significant losses. Analysts argued that Radev's strategic ambiguity towards Russia and the EU had allowed him to take votes from both GERB and Revival. Political scientist Svetlin Tachev argued that PP–DB would have received stronger support if Radev had not entered the electoral race.

=== Comparisons to Eurosceptic and pro-Russian governments ===
The Atlantic Council warned that a Radev-led government could "replace Hungary as Putin's proxy inside the EU and NATO", although it assessed that the influence would be "nowhere near that of Viktor Orbán, at least initially." It concluded that Radev's government would be bad news for Ukraine and would represent a significant win for Russia. Politico included Radev as one of the five "possible successors to Orbán as a key destabilizer in the EU", alongside Fico of Slovakia and Czech Republic Prime Minister Andrej Babiš, further adding that his pro-Russian stances had drawn a strong rebuke from Ukrainian President Volodymyr Zelenskyy in 2023. Reuters reported that Radev's campaign drew comparisons with Orbán when he talked about improving ties with Moscow and resuming the free flow of Russian oil and gas into Europe. Raidió Teilifís Éireann also observed that Radev could find common ground with Fico and Babis, arguing that his victory speech was Eurosceptic and there is a risk he becomes the next disrupter of EU after Orbán if he pushes to restore Russian oil imports to Bulgaria. The European Council on Foreign Relations (ECFR) published an analysis arguing that Radev would be closer to Fico than Orbán, is ready to criticise the European Commission, especially on the EU energy policy and the European Green Deal, and would be tough on EU's enlargement; however, it predicted that Radev would generally not try to block major EU decisions, such as on Ukraine, for fear of losing EU funds. Another analysis maintained that in part because of Radev's dependence on PP–DB and the tide of public opinion, he could sometimes sound like Orban but would probably end up acting more like Fico. NIN also compared Radev to Fico rather than Orbán. In an interview, MEP Radan Kanev said that Radev would be more likely to resemble Fico in "speaking one thing, [and] doing a different one."

Al Jazeera English reported that Radev's stance on foreign policy had drawn attention in Europe, leading to a "pro-Russian" label as he objected to a defence pact concluded between Bulgaria and Ukraine in March and had called for the resumption of Russian imports to Europe despite EU sanctions on Russian oil. It added that some had branded Radev a Eurosceptic because he criticised aspects of EU policy, including reliance on renewable energy and Bulgaria's adoption of the euro, saying in a campaign rally: "The coalition-makers introduced the euro in Bulgaria without asking you. And now, when you pay your bills, always remember which politicians promised you that you would be in the 'club of the rich'." At the same time, it observed that Radev had said in his victory speech he would take a pragmatic approach. The New York Times also reported that Radev was perceived as pro-Russian and Eurosceptic on many issues, and that Radev's positioning on Russia had been a calculated balancing act to draw support from voters from all sides. It said analysts noted that he would have to clarify some of his positions as he would be making executive decisions for the first time. The BBC framed Radev as a "pragmatic, somewhat pro-Russian leader, who has criticised EU sanctions, and called for constructive dialogue with the Kremlin." The Guardian described Radev as Moscow-friendly and concluded that it could be bad for the EU. Meanwhile, it reported that EU diplomats had said they did not expect Radev to seek to take over Orbán's role as the EU's chief disrupter.

Ruslan Stefanov, an analyst at the Centre for the Study of Diplomacy, described Radev as a politician of "considerable strategic ambivalence toward Russia" who has "tried to cater to extreme Eurosceptic, and typically also pro-Russian, voter groups." Emilia Zankina of Temple University Rome agreed, saying: "There is a great concern that he may try to steer the country away from its pro-European line." Bulgarian political expert Dimitar Bechev told Politico that the biggest question is "what a future coalition will look like" and that Radev has to make a choice on the rule of law, deciding whether to align with anti-corruption reformists or defend vested interests. Frankfurter Allgemeine Zeitung said that "almost nothing is known about his intentions, especially in the area of financial and fiscal policy." An article published by Novinite argued that Western media's binary of "NATO pilot or Putin sympathizer" was too simple and that Radev, like Bulgaria itself, exists in the gray zone between the East and the West, comparing him to Péter Magyar rather than Orbán. Maria Simeonova of the Sofia bureau of the ECFR analysed Radev's Eurosceptic comments as being primary towards Bulgarians, stating: "His criticism, particularly regarding financial and military support for Ukraine or sanctions against Russia, will be aimed primarily at the domestic audience." Renew Europe politicians, such as Valérie Hayer and Nikola Minchev, branded the elections as a risk of another trojan horse in the EU.

== See also ==
- 2025–2026 Bulgarian protests
- 2026 Bulgarian presidential election
- 2026 elections in the European Union
- 2026 Hungarian parliamentary election
- Corruption in Bulgaria
- List of political parties in Bulgaria
- Presidency of Rumen Radev
