= Green Movement (Bulgaria) =

Bulgarian political party

Green Movement Зелено движение
- Leader: Kalin Angelov; Daniela Bozhinova
- Founded: 18 May 2008
- Headquarters: Sofia
- Ideology: Green politics; Green liberalism; Social liberalism
- Political position: Centre
- National affiliation: DB (until 2024)
- European affiliation: European Green Party
- European Parliament group: Greens–European Free Alliance
- International affiliation: Global Greens (Associate)
- Colors: Green
- National Assembly: 0 / 240
- European Parliament: 0 / 17

Website
- zelenodvizhenie.bg

Green Movement (Bulgarian: Зелено движение, romanized: Zeleno dvizhenie), until 2019 The Greens (Bulgarian: Зелените, romanized: Zelenite), is a green-liberal political party in Bulgaria founded in 2008.

== History ==
Green Movement emerged from a number of non-governmental organizations who felt, after years of work in the area of environment protection, human rights, etc. that their work needed serious political backing if it was to have a lasting effect. A major motivation to found a political party was criticism of various shortcomings in the political system in Bulgaria, including widespread corruption, lack of democratic control, and the general malfunction of state institutions at all levels. The party had its inaugural meeting in May 2008 in Sofia (capital of Bulgaria). During the following three months, more than 6000 members were registered. According to its statutes, the party has two chairpersons with equal rights.

In 2019, shortly before the European elections, the party was forced to change its name from "The Greens" to "Green Movement" because of a decision by Bulgaria's Supreme Court of Cassation which stated that another party had a right to the name. The leadership of Green Movement commented for the media: "Unfortunately, the pressure on us comes literally on the eve of the upcoming elections to the European Parliament, and at a time when the Greens, as part of the Democratic Bulgaria coalition, we have all chances to become a real political factor opposing the corrupt and populist status quo".

== Chairpersons ==
As first chairpersons were elected Denica Petrova, Andrey Kovatchev and Petko Kovachev (2008). A national assembly of the party in May 2010 consisting of about 50 delegates elected a new board of chairpersons with Georg Tuparev, Daniela Bozhinova and Andrey Kovachev.

== Program ==
Green Movement see themselves as part of the network of green parties in Europe. The political program of the Greens reflects a large extent the program of the European Green Party but also includes topics specific for Bulgaria such as changes in the political system in order to overcome inherent problems of governance and democratic control.

== Electoral history ==
=== National Assembly ===
Election	Votes	%	Seats	+/–	Government
2009	21,841	0.52 (#9)	0 / 240	New	Extra-parliamentary
2013	26,520	0.75 (#14)	0 / 240	0	Extra-parliamentary
2014	19,990	0.61 (#11)	0 / 240	0	Extra-parliamentary
2017 (Note: Run as part of the Movement "Yes, Bulgaria" coalition (DaB!, The Greens and DEOS).)	101,217	2.96 (#7)	0 / 240	0	Extra-parliamentary
Apr 2021 (Note: Run as part of the Democratic Bulgaria coalition.)	302,280	9.31 (#5)	4 / 240	▲4	Snap election
Jul 2021	345,331	12.48 (#4)	4 / 240	0	Snap election
Nov 2021	166,968	6,28 (#6)	2 / 240	▼2	Coalition
2022	186,511	7.45 (#6)	3 / 240	▲1	Snap election
2023 (Note: Run as part of the PP–DB coalition.)	621,069	23.54 (#2)	3 / 240	0	Coalition
June 2024	9,324	0.42 (#15)	0 / 240	▼3	Extra-parliamentary
Oct 2024	Did not participate				
2026 (Note: Run as part of the Anti-Corruption Bloc coalition.)	18,999	0.58 (#12)	0 / 240	0	Extra-parliamentary

=== European Parliament ===
Election	# of seats won	# of total votes	% of popular vote	rank	Notes
2009	0 / 18	18,444	0.72%	10th	
2014	0 / 17	12,547	0.56%	11th	
2019	0 / 17 of 1 / 17	118,484	6.06%	5th	In a coalition with Yes, Bulgaria! and Democrats for a Strong Bulgaria as Democratic Bulgaria
2024	0 / 17	8,347	0.41%	17th	

== Save Pirin Protests ==
In 2018, the Greens supported the "Save Pirin" mass protests in Bulgaria against the expansion of the ski area in the Pirin National Park.
