= Siyanie =

Bulgarian political movement

Shine Сияние
- Chairperson: Nikolay Popov
- Founded: 2025 (movement); 2026 (electoral coalition)
- Ideology: Anti-corruption
- Colours: Blue; Yellow
- National Assembly: 0 / 240

Siyanie (Bulgarian: Сияние; lit. 'Shine' or 'Shining') is an anti-corruption political movement and electoral list in Bulgaria led by Nikolay Popov.

== History ==
=== Founding and movement ===
In March 2025, 12-year-old Siyana Popova died in a car crash in a collision with a truck in the Pleven region of Bulgaria. Her father, Nikolay Popov, said that many reports had been submitted about the poor condition of the road prior to the death of his daughter. The incident led to protests across the country on the condition of the roads.

Following the incident, Popov campaigned on corruption in the country and particularly the court system. As a part of this movement, he garnered 22,000 signatures on a petition calling for the Supreme Court of Cassation president Galina Kakharova to resign due to corruption. He formed a movement named after his daughter in February 2026.

=== Electoral politics ===
In March 2026, Popov announced that his movement would be taking part in the 2026 Bulgarian parliamentary election, forming a civic electoral list. To run in the election, they allied with two smaller parties: Volt Bulgaria and Society for a New Bulgaria.

== Composition ==
| Party/Group | Leader | Ideology |
|---|---|---|
| Siyanie | Nikolay Popov | Anti-corruption |
| Volt Bulgaria | Nastimir Ananiev | Social liberalism Pro-Europeanism |
| Society for a New Bulgaria | Margarit Mitsev | Conservatism |

== Election results ==
=== National Assembly ===
| Election | Leader | Votes | % | Seats | +/– | Status |
|---|---|---|---|---|---|---|
| 2026 | Nikolay Popov | 93,559 | 2.84 (#9) | 0 / 240 | New | Extra-parliamentary |
