= Yes, Bulgaria! =

Bulgarian political party

Yes, Bulgaria! Да, България!
- Abbreviation: DaB!
- Leader: Bozhidar Bozhanov; Ivaylo Mirchev
- Founder: Hristo Ivanov
- Founded: 7 January 2017; 9 years ago
- Headquarters: Dragan Tsankov Blvd, Sofia, Bulgaria
- Youth wing: Young Bulgaria (МлаДа България)
- Ideology: Liberalism (Bulgarian); Anti-corruption; Pro-Europeanism
- Political position: Centre to centre-right
- National affiliation: Democratic Bulgaria (2018-present); PP–DB (2023-present)
- European affiliation: European People’s Party (intention to join)
- Colours: Green; Purple
- National Assembly: 12 / 240
- European Parliament: 0 / 17
- Sofia City Council: 5 / 61

Website
- dabulgaria.bg

Yes, Bulgaria! (Bulgarian: Да, България!, romanized: Da, Balgariya!, DaB!), is a Bulgarian political party, founded in January 2017 by former Minister of Justice Hristo Ivanov. Yes, Bulgaria! is part of an electoral alliance with the Democrats for a Strong Bulgaria called Democratic Bulgaria.

== History ==
The party was founded on 7 January 2017, by Hristo Ivanov, who served as Deputy Prime Minister and Minister of Justice in the caretaker Bliznashki Cabinet from 6 August 2014 until 7 November 2014. He then served as Minister of Justice in the Second Borisov Cabinet from 7 November 2014 until his resignation on 9 December 2015, submitted in protest of failed attempts at judicial reform. At its first meeting, Ivanov outlined the party's three main priorities – "to ensure the rule of law and efficient and accessible justice; to accelerate the pace of growth of the country; and the fight against systemic poverty and for raising the standards of living."

According to the Sofia Globe, "Ivanov did something few Bulgarian politicians have done before him: He stood up for his principles."

On 11 January 2017, Ivanov was elected as the party's chairman, together with an Executive Council of 13 parliamentary deputies. Two days later Yes, Bulgaria! submitted their registration documents for the upcoming parliamentary elections at the end of March. In the following weeks, several political formations approached the new party in order to form a possible coalition for the elections, including The Greens, DEOS and the Bulgaria for Citizens Movement. Radan Kanev's Democrats for a Strong Bulgaria, which had previously split from the Reformist Bloc in November 2016, offered to unite with Ivanov's party. In response, Yes, Bulgaria! announced they will attempt to run independently, with Ivanov saying that “it is fair to establish a long-term connection with the voter, to have our own image," thus rejecting the offer from Kanev's now re-branded 'New Republic' coalition.

On 30 January, the Sofia Municipal Court approved the registration of Yes, Bulgaria! as a political party, but three subsequent official complaints against that decision meant the leadership was forced to look for a possible coalition in order to make the deadline for registration. On February 8, Hristo Ivanov announced that an agreement to form a coalition between Yes, Bulgaria!, The Greens and DEOS had been reached, and registration would be possible after the collection of over 20,000 signatures in one day. All three complaints were later withdrawn, and despite further appeals to the Central Electoral Commission, the coalition was cleared for participation on February 15.

According to Novinite, "The Greens are Bulgaria's most active environmentalist party, while DEOS is a liberal organization focusing on the 'rule of law', active civic participation, and minorities."

At the 2017 elections, Yes, Bulgaria won a total of 101,217 votes, or 2.96% of all votes cast, leaving it as the 7th largest formation, but without parliamentary representation. In Sofia's three constituencies, the party gained a total of 7.77% of all votes cast, coming in at 4th place, less than 1,000 votes behind 3rd placed United Patriots. In total, more than 70,000 votes (almost 70%) came from Sofia, Plovdiv, and Varna, as well as from Bulgarians abroad.

On 30 March 2020, during the COVID-19 pandemic in the country, the Sofia City Council members from Democratic Bulgaria, a coalition Yes, Bulgaria is part of, proposed a package of measures in defense of local economy. Those included ten-fold tax cut for landlords for leasing an apartment, rent-free period for businesses renting municipal property for the duration of the national emergency, and reorganization of Sofia public transport in view of the reduced passenger flow.

Hristo Ivanov and the entire party leadership announced on 15 November their resignation following the DB coalition's poor results in the 14 November elections. He was re-elected as leader in January 2022.

=== Founders ===
Founders of the party included "intellectuals, entrepreneurs, artists" and many others, who had "intolerance" for corruption and poverty. Some of the party's founders included Dr. Boryana Museva (associate professor of law at Sofia University), economist Vera Asenova, former tennis player Manuela Maleeva, and associate law professor Kristian Takov (until his death in 2017).

One notable member of Yes, Bulgaria is activist Georgi Iliev. He "was one of the organizers of protests during the Peevski scandal the Socialist-led government caused" in 2013.

Following the poor result of the PP-DB alliance in the June 2024 Bulgarian parliamentary election, Hristo Ivanov resigned as leader of Yes, Bulgaria! and refused to take up his seat as an MP.

== Political views ==
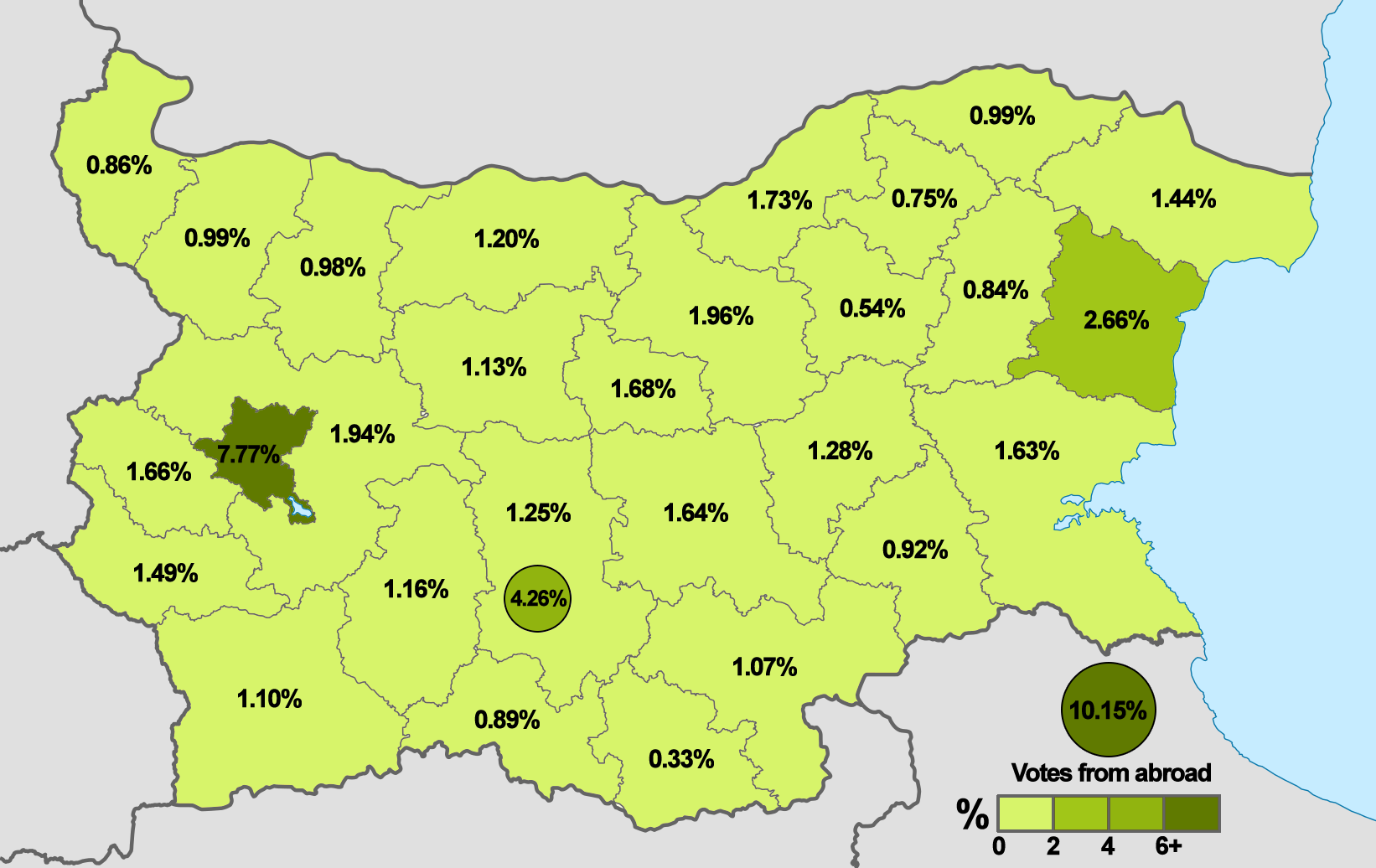
2017 parliamentary election results by province, showing the party's disproportionately strong showing in the 3 largest cities, as well as abroad.

In its founding declaration, the party featured seven major principles – personal freedoms and human rights, justice via rule of law, security through democracy and strong institutions, serving the public interest, creation of wealth through entrepreneurship and free enterprise, social solidarity, as well as pluralism and freedom of public debate. The document also outlined the party's 11 major goals. These included judicial, regulatory and media reforms, anti-corruption measures, increased economic growth, a focus on transparent administration and e-governance, higher education standards, civic engagement, energy independence and preservation of the country's national resources, as well as a completion of its integration into the European Union structures – full membership in the Eurozone, Schengen and the banking union.

Yes, Bulgaria's founder Hristo Ivanov has been particularly vocal about the necessity for reform in Bulgaria's justice system. He has raised concern about the excessive powers and lack of accountability of Bulgaria's General Prosecutor Sotir Tsatsarov. He has emphasized that Bulgaria's Prosecution has a Stalinist model which compromises the rule of law. He has repeatedly asked for Sotir Tsatsarov's resignation as the Prosecution was allegedly involved in major corruption scandals.

== Election results ==
=== National Assembly ===
Election	Leader	Votes	%	Seats	+/–	Government
2017	Hristo Ivanov	101,177	2.88 (#7)	0 / 240	New	Extra-parliamentary
Apr 2021 (Note: Run as part of the Democratic Bulgaria coalition.)	Hristo Ivanov	302,280	9.31 (#5)	13 / 240	▲13	Snap election
July 2021	Hristo Ivanov	345,331	12.48 (#4)	19 / 240	▲6	Snap election
Nov 2021	Hristo Ivanov	166,968	6.28 (#6)	7 / 240	▼12	Coalition
2022	Hristo Ivanov	186,511	7.45 (#6)	9 / 240	▲2	Snap election
2023 (Note: Run as part of the PP–DB coalition.)	Hristo Ivanov	621,069	23.54 (#2)	13 / 240	▲4	Coalition
Jun 2024	Hristo Ivanov	307,849	13.92 (#3)	9 / 240	▼4	Snap election
Oct 2024	Vacant	346,063	13.74 (#2)	12 / 240	▲3	Opposition
2026	Bozhidar Bozhanov; Ivaylo Mirchev	408,846	12.42 (#3)	13 / 240	▲1	Opposition

=== European Parliament ===
Election	List leader	Votes	%	Seats	+/–	EP Group
2019 (Note: Part of the Democratic Bulgaria coalition, that won 1 seat)	Radan Kanev	154,996	5.88 (#5)	0 / 17	New	–
2024 (Note: Part of the PP-DB coalition, that won 3 seats)	Nikola Minchev	290,865	14.45 (#3)	0 / 17	0	–

=== President ===
Election	Candidate	First round			Second round		
Election	Candidate	Votes	%	Rank	Votes	%	Result
2026	Andrey Gyurov	486,232	31.95	2nd			TBA
