= Hristo Ivanov (politician) =

Bulgarian politician and lawyer

- Христо Иванов
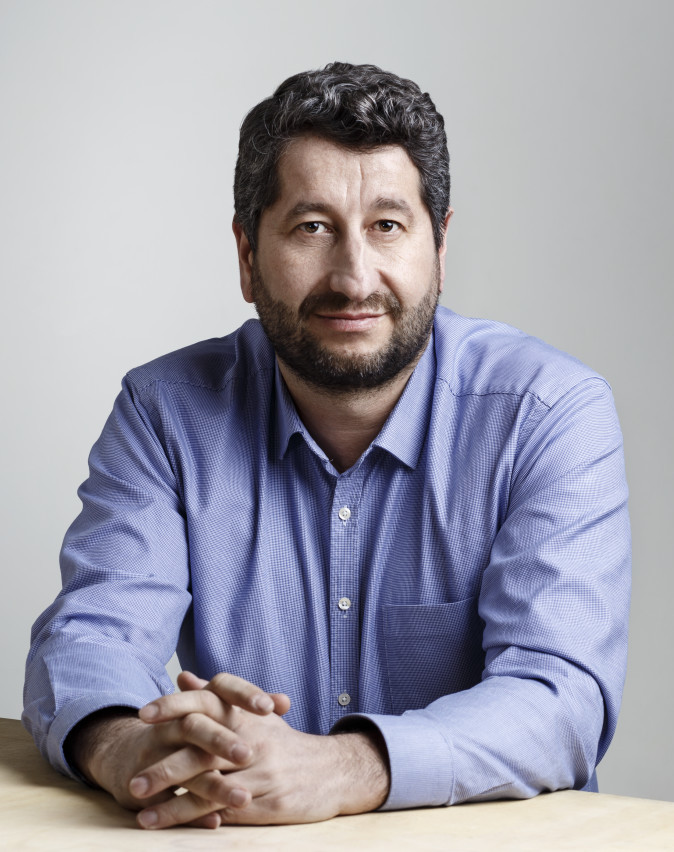
- Official portrait, 2017

Member of the National Assembly
- In office 15 April 2021 – 21 June 2024
- Constituency: 25th MMC - Sofia (2021-2021); 16th MMC - Plovdiv (2021-2023); 24th MMC - Sofia (2023-2024)

Leader of Yes, Bulgaria!
- In office 7 January 2017 – 27 April 2025
- Preceded by: Position established
- Succeeded by: Bozhidar Bozhanov; Ivaylo Mirchev

Minister of Justice
- In office 6 August 2014 – 9 December 2015
- Prime Minister: Georgi Bliznashki; Boyko Borisov
- Preceded by: Zinaida Zlatanova
- Succeeded by: Ekaterina Zakharieva

Deputy Prime Minister of Bulgaria (Note: Portfolio split between Ivanov, Ekaterina Zaharieva, Iliyana Tsanova and Yordan Hristoskov)
- In office 6 August 2014 – 7 November 2014
- Prime Minister: Georgi Bliznashki
- Preceded by: Daniela Bobeva (Note: Portfolio split between Bobeva, Tsvetlin Yovchev and Zinaida Zlatanova)
- Succeeded by: Tomislav Donchev (Note: Portfolio split between Donchev, Meglena Kuneva,Ivaylo Kalfin and Rumyana Bachvarova)

Personal details
- Born: Hristo Lyubomirov Ivanov; 13 September 1974 (age 51) Sofia, PR Bulgaria
- Party: DaB!
- Other political affiliations: Independent (until 2017)
- Children: 2
- Education: Sofia University (LL.B, LL.M)
- Occupation: Politician; lawyer

Hristo Lyubomirov Ivanov (Bulgarian: Христо Любомиров Иванов, born 13 September 1974) is a Bulgarian politician who served as Member of the National Assembly from 2021 to 2024. A member of the Yes, Bulgaria! (DaB!) party, which he founded and led from 2017 to 2024, he previously served as Minister of Justice from 2014 to 2015 and briefly as Deputy Prime Minister in 2014.

== Education ==
Ivanov has a Master of Laws (LL.M.) degree from the University of Sofia (St. Kliment Ohridski). He has specialized in US National Security Law and Judicial Appointments Procedures at the American University's Washington College of Law through the Fulbright/Hubert Humphrey Fellowship Program.

== Family ==
His mother, Maria Boikikeva was born in Moscow and was a member of the Communist party, from which she was later suspended due to her support for Václav Havel. His father was a civil engineer. A political emigrant from Bulgaria to Germany, his grandfather, Nedyalko Boikikev, was convicted of organizing an exhibition "White Terror in Bulgaria" (September Uprising).

== Career ==
Between 1996 and 2002, he worked as a coordinator of legal and justice reform projects under the Initiative for Rule of Law at the American Bar Association.

Between 2002 and 2006, he worked as an independent consultant for various international institutions and private clients on projects related to the evaluation of legislations and promoting the rule of law.

Between 2006 and 2014, Ivanov was Program Director at the Bulgarian Institute for Legal Initiatives, where he led projects related to the judicial reform, the prevention of corruption and promoting the rule of law.

He was registered as a lawyer in 2002, but because of unpaid bar association fees he lost his license to practice law

In December 2016, Ivanov announced his intention to create a new political party called "Yes, Bulgaria!" (Да, България!) under the slogan "Let's get political!". In a bid to promote the new political entity, he initiated a series of meetings entitled "Is there a Bulgarian dream? Talks about Bulgaria".

=== Justice minister ===
Hristo Ivanov was appointed Deputy Prime Minister for justice, internal affairs and security, as well as Justice Minister in the transitional government of Georgi Bliznashki. After the transitional cabinet's term expired, Ivanov was appointed as Justice Minister in the Second Borisov Cabinet on 8 November 2014. He resigned on 9 December 2015 after disagreements with Boyko Borisov over Ivanov's proposed justice reform plan. Ivanov was primarily worried about the excessive powers of Bulgaria's prosecution.

==== Resignation ====
Following his resignation from Borisov's government, Ivanov stated that he had remained committed to the rule of law and would continue to argue for reform in Bulgaria's Prosecution. His opinion was shared by the Venice Commission whose President emphasized that “The Soviet model of [Bulgaria's] prosecution must be decisively turned down. It turns it into a source of corruption and blackmail and creates opportunities for its use for political aims.” In 2017, Ivanov repeatedly argued that Bulgaria's Prosecutor General Sotir Tsatsarov should resign "without any doubt." Indeed, Tsatsarov was nominated for sanctions under the Magnitsky Act which allows the US Government to sanction foreign government officials who violate human rights to hide corruption. Ivanov has expressed discontent that all recent reports by the Turkish Anti-Smuggling and Organized Crime Department refer to cigarette smuggling by the Bulgarian company Bulgartabac, but the Bulgarian prosecution refuses to investigate.

Hristo Ivanov became a vocal critic of the Mechanism for Cooperation and Verification to which Bulgaria is subjected by the European Commission. Under this mechanism, the commission is supposed to verify progress in key areas such as judicial independence and the fight against corruption. Ivanov argues, however, that this mechanism has been "politically killed": He contends that Jean-Claude Juncker and Frans Timmermans make unprincipled comments that this mechanism would be terminated for Bulgaria despite the fact that there is no real judicial reform and the government establishes "authoritarian practices."

However, in April 2019, after an article in a progovernment tabloid, Ivanov's wife was caught up in a real estate scandal, as his 2016 property declaration was made public and reportedly showed that his wife had allegedly bought an apartment and a car at very low, submarket prices. Ivanov rejected the allegations, stating that "his name had been caught up in the scandal with the purpose of placing everyone under a common denominator" and insisted that he had no properties obtained through "illegal or suspicious means".

==== Judge assignment investigation ====
In April 2020, Ivanov was summoned for interrogation as a witness by Bulgarian prosecution with regards to an investigation over an alleged breach and manipulation of the electronic system for the distribution of judges to cases within the judicial system. The system, which is designed to randomly assign cases to competent judges within their shift, was found to have allowed manipulation which permitted a bad actor to predefine which judges would be assigned to which cases without leaving any evidence of said manipulation. The system was found to have been integrated during Ivanov's tenure as justice minister and the prosecution stated that it was looking into whether or not Ivanov had lobbied private interests during its development. Ivanov stated that he would come "as a good-willed citizen and jurist to assist the investigation", adding that "it was possible that he could have ordered a move that at the time seemed reasonable".

=== The Dogan scandal ===
On 7 July 2020, Ivanov and a few activists disembarked from a motorboat near the seaside villa of Bulgarian oligarch Ahmed Dogan in Burgas and tried to plant a Bulgarian flag there. Ivanov wanted to show that Dogan was illegally treating the beach as his own, even though all the Bulgarian beaches are state owned and should be accessible to all Bulgarian citizens. There they were intercepted by security guards from National Service for Protection, who insisted that the beach was privately owned, pushed them into the water, and called the police, which assisted them. The whole incident was live-streamed by one of the activists.

In an address to the nation the following day, President of Bulgaria Rumen Radev revealed that the guards were employees of the National Service for Protection, which is only mandated to protect state leaders.

This scandal, along with the police raid on the Presidency of Bulgaria two days later, sparked several months of major protests against the government of Boyko Borisov. The protests gathered a various government opposition groups, including some former political opponents, and along with Hristo Ivanov's action in Rosenets were met with a high level of public approval, up to over 60% and 50% respectively In an article for Trud, largely in the tone of the pro-government press, Ivanov's actions were criticised by Rumen Petkov, a leader of ABV, a small opposition party trying to hitchhike the protest movement, as an attempt to "ride" the protest, stating that in doing so Ivanov had divided the protest movement, an action which only ended up "serving the government", despite that Ivanov actions were one of the two sparks that ignited the protests.

==== Lambovski scandal ====
During one of the protests, which Ivanov attended and livestreamed, he appeared to be approached by a former NDSV parliamentarian linked to the SIC crime group named Dimitar Lambovski, who mentioned 'He called Madzho' - the nickname of a prominent Bulgarian crime boss Младен Михалев. Ivanov appeared to shush Lambovski, appearing to tell him to talk at a later time as he was recording, which according to pro-government Bulgarian media raised suspicions as to whether or not Ivanov had ties to underground groups. Ivanov admitted to having met Lambovski before, but denied having any affiliation to him and stated that he had shushed him so that his livestreams would not "become a platform for such stories". Later Lambovski explained that he was referring as 'he' to Stoyan Mavrodiev, the former chairman of the Bulgarian Development Bank. Lambovski's connection to Mavrodiev was later confirmed by a leaked recording of a meeting between them. The lengthy conversation itself raised many questions about connections between Boyko Borisov and Delyan Peevski (mentioned with his nickname "Shishi" in the leaked conversation).

=== 2021 Elections ===
In late 2020, protest leaders attempted to form a coalition of extra-parliamentary political movements to take down Borisov's government. The talks, which included Maya Manolova's IzpraviSe.BG movement, the "Poisonous Trio" of independent protest organizers and Slavi Trifonov's 'There Is Such A People party offered Ivanov and his DB to be part of the coalition. However, Ivanov stated in an interview in early 2021 that he had rejected the proposals and his coalition would take part in the 2021 Bulgarian parliamentary election alone. He also added that he would refuse the offer of a hypothetical coalition government if offered not just by the pro-government GERB and DPS parties, but by the opposition BSP as well.

In 2021 Ivanov stated that he had made the forming of a majority government around his DB coalition the coalition's overriding goal going into the 2021 election. Ivanov stated that "power was not an end goal", but also that a hypothetical future parliament in which his coalition would be in opposition, as opposed to being in power, would "be an extremely sad parliament, which would end very quickly".

== Personal life ==
Hristo Ivanov is married and has two sons.

== See also ==
2020–2021 Bulgarian protests
