= Democrats for a Strong Bulgaria =

Bulgarian political party

Democrats for a Strong Bulgaria Демократи за силна България
- Abbreviation: DSB
- Leader: Radan Kanev
- Founder: Ivan Kostov
- Founded: 30 May 2004
- Split from: Union of Democratic Forces
- Headquarters: 18 Vitosha Blvd., Sofia
- Youth wing: YDSB
- Women's wing: WDSB
- Membership: 15,000
- Ideology: Conservatism; Conservative liberalism; Economic liberalism; Anti-communism; Pro-Europeanism
- Political position: Centre-right to right-wing
- National affiliation: Democratic Bulgaria (2018 - present); PP–DB (2023 - present)
- European affiliation: European People's Party
- European Parliament group: European People's Party Group
- Colors: Blue
- Slogan: "For a Strong Bulgaria in a Unified Europe" (За силна България в обединена Европа)
- National Assembly: 8 / 240
- European Parliament: 1 / 17

Website
- dsb.bg

Democrats for a Strong Bulgaria (Bulgarian: Демократи за силна България, ДСБ, romanized: Demokrati za Silna Balgariya, DSB) is a political party in Bulgaria established by former Prime Minister Ivan Kostov (1997–2001).

== History ==
Kostov resigned as chairman of the United Democratic Forces after a painful election defeat in June 2001 to Simeon Saxe-Coburg-Gotha's newly established National Movement for Simeon II. The UDF had suffered heavily from allegations of corruption and increased unemployment after having carried out economic reforms during its four-year term.

With time 29 (out of 51) UDF MPs including Kostov grew increasingly dissatisfied with the new UDF leadership of chairwoman Nadezhda Mihailova, who was the foreign minister in Kostov's own government. Following another defeat for the UDF in the 2003 local elections and after Nadezhda Mihailova's refusal to bear the responsibility and resign, the group of 29 around Kostov announced their departure from the UDF and the formation of a new political force, the DSB.

DSB is a member of the European People's Party (EPP).

On 30 March 2020, during the COVID-19 pandemic in the country, the Sofia City Council members from Democratic Bulgaria, a coalition Democrats for a Strong Bulgaria is part of, proposed a package of measures in defense of local economy. Those included ten-fold tax cut for landlords for leasing an apartment, rent-free period for businesses renting municipal property for the duration of the national emergency, and reorganization of Sofia public transport in view of the reduced passenger flow.

== Leaders ==
Former DSB logo

It was chaired by Ivan Kostov since its establishment in May 2004 until June 2013. He resigned after failing to reach the 4% electoral threshold in the 2013 election. The party was chaired by Radan Kanev, until his resignation following the 2017 election. Since then it has been chaired by Atanas Atanasov.

• Ivan Kostov (2004 - 2013)

• Radan Kanev (2013 - 2017)

• Atanas Atanasov (2017 - 2026)

• Radan Kanev (2026 - present)

== Election results ==
=== National Assembly ===
Election	Leader	Votes	%	Seats	+/–	Government
2005	Ivan Kostov	234,788	6.44 (#6)	17 / 240	New	Opposition
2009 (Note: Run as part of the Blue Coalition.)	Ivan Kostov	285,671	6.76 (#5)	15 / 240	▼2	Support
2013	Ivan Kostov	103,638	2.93 (#7)	0 / 240	▼15	Extra-parliamentary
2014 (Note: Run as part of the Reformist Bloc.)	Radan Kanev	291,806	8.89 (#4)	23 / 240	▲23	Coalition
2017 (Note: Run as part of New Republic, a coalition between Bulgarian democratic community, Union for Plovdiv and Democrats for a Strong Bulgaria.)	Radan Kanev	86,984	2.48 (#6)	0 / 240	▼23	Extra-parliamentary
Apr 2021 (Note: Run as part of the Democratic Bulgaria coalition.)	Atanas Atanasov	302,280	9.31 (#5)	10 / 240	▲10	Snap election
Jul 2021	Atanas Atanasov	345,331	12.64 (#4)	11 / 240	▲1	Snap election
Nov 2021	Atanas Atanasov	166,966	6.37 (#6)	7 / 240	▼4	Coalition
2022	Atanas Atanasov	186,511	7.45 (#6)	8 / 240	▲1	Snap election
2023 (Note: Run as part of the PP–DB coalition.)	Atanas Atanasov	621,069	23.54 (#2)	10 / 240	▲2	Coalition
Jun 2024	Atanas Atanasov	307,849	13.92 (#3)	8 / 240	▼2	Snap election
Oct 2024	Atanas Atanasov	346,063	13.74 (#2)	6 / 240	▼2	Opposition
2026	Atanas Atanasov	408,846	12.42 (#3)	8 / 240	▲2	Opposition

=== President of Bulgaria ===
Election year	Candidate	First round			Second round		
Election year	Candidate	Votes	%	Rank	Votes	%	Rank
2006	Nedelcho Beronov	271,078	9.75%	3rd	—N/a		Lost
2011	Rumen Hristov	65,761	1.95%	6th	—N/a		Lost
2016	Traycho Traykov	224,734	5.87%	6th	—N/a		Lost
2021	Lozan Panov	98,488	3.68%	5th	—N/a		Lost
2026	Andrey Gyurov	486,232	31.95	2nd			TBA

=== European Parliament ===
Election	List leader	Votes	%	Seats	+/–	EP Group
2007	Konstantin Dimitrov	84,350	4.35 (#7)	0 / 18	New	–
2009 (Note: Run as part of the Blue Coalition.)	Nadezhda Mihaylova	204,817	7.95 (#6)	2 / 18	▲2	EPP
2014 (Note: Run as part of the Reformist Bloc.)	Meglena Kuneva	144,532	6.45 (#5)	1 / 17	▼1	EPP
2019 (Note: Run as part of the Democratic Bulgaria coalition.)	Radan Kanev	118,484	6.06 (#5)	1 / 17	0	EPP
2024 (Note: Run as part of the PP-DB coalition.)	Nikola Minchev	290,865	14.45 (#3)	1 / 17	0	EPP

== Program ==
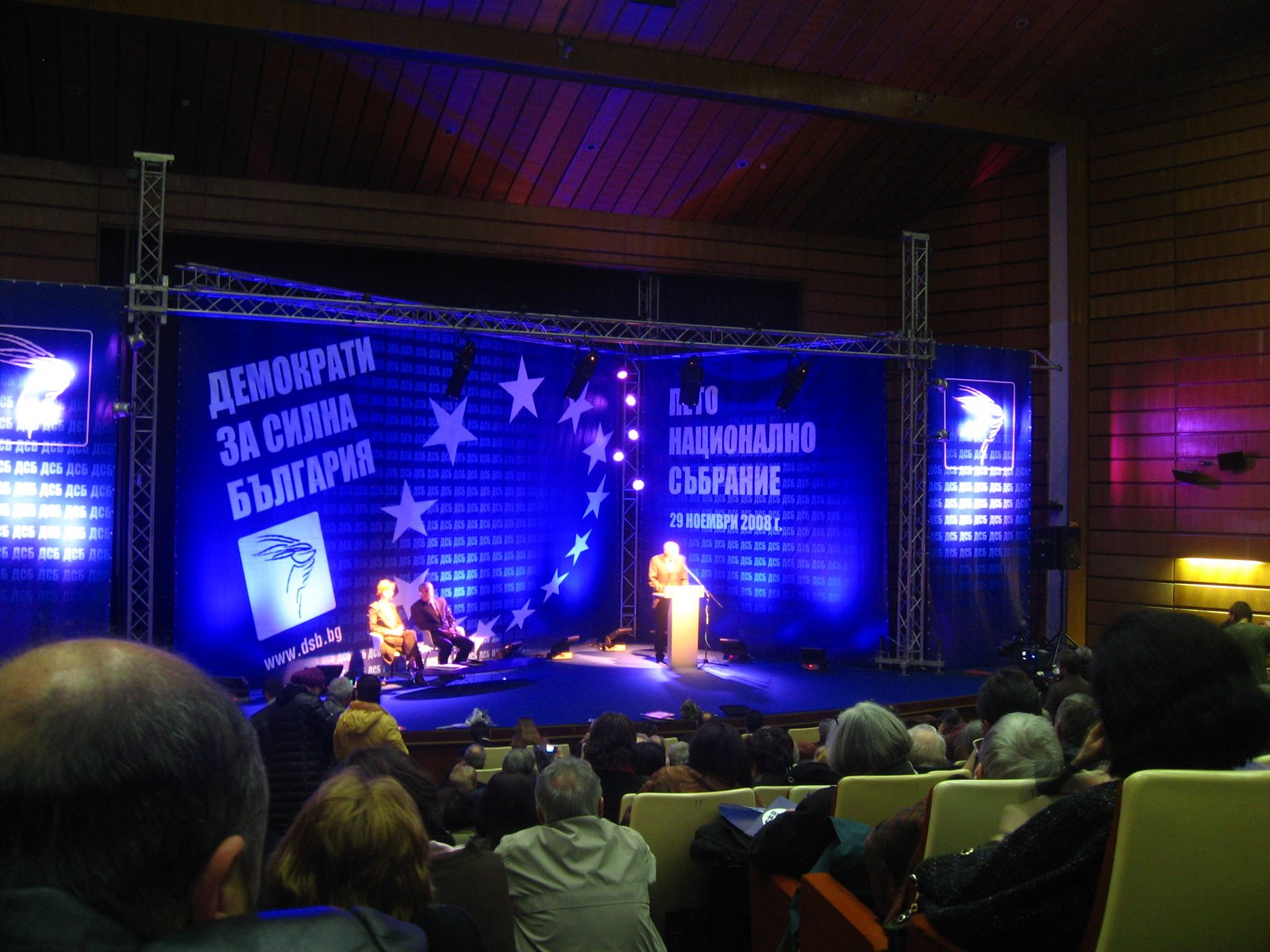
The fifth national meeting of the DSB in Sofia

The DSB define themselves as a moderately conservative, but also nationally oriented party.

They regard themselves as successors of the ruling mandate of the United Democratic Forces (1997–2001) and promise to stand up for its achievements and build on them.

The party stands for a new structure, composition and organization of the constitutional powers in Bulgaria through the adoption of a new Constitution.

They propose a decrease in overall taxes, the creation of an investor-friendly tax and insurance environment and tax and insurance incentives to small and medium-sized enterprises and to companies that generate long-term employment. The DSB propose to reform the law enforcement institutions in order to cut off their connection with the criminal world and in order to abolish corruption. They also insist on making officials of the executive and the other branches of power fully accountable for their actions stripping them of their immunity.

They support the independence and public nature of the National Health Insurance Fund, the promotion of additional health insurance schemes through optional funds and competition between these funds.

The DSB stand for integration and coexistence of different ethnic communities on the basis of equality before the Law, regardless of religion, gender and origin and strongly oppose Ahmed Dogan, the leader of the Movement for Rights and Freedoms claiming that his "Bulgarian Ethnic Model" is one of separation and encapsulation of Bulgarian Turks, aimed at monopolizing their vote instead of integrating them in Bulgarian society. This opposition has often been referred to as anti-minority nationalism.

Kostov and the DSB are outspoken opponents of the Bulgarian Socialist Party whom they regard as the heir to the Bulgarian Communist Party and define them as their main political enemy. They have also often criticized ex-Prime Minister Simeon Saxe-Coburg-Gotha for allying himself with the socialists and who is accused, very much like Kostov was, of corruption.

Kostov's government was the one to begin adhesion talks with the European Union back in 1999 and the DSB continue to support European orientation for the country.

Before the elections of June 2005 Democrats for a Strong Bulgaria issued the Treaty for a Strong Bulgaria which is a 12-point resume of their program.
