= Atanas Atanasov (politician, born 1959) =

Bulgarian lawyer and politician (born 1959)

- Атанас Атанасов
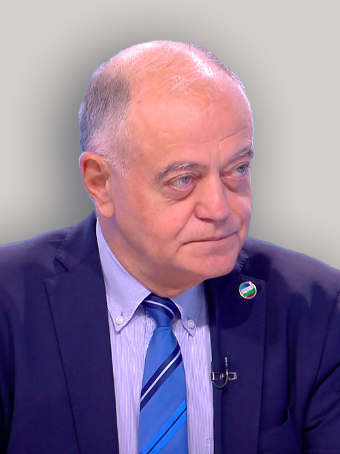
- Atanasov in 2024

Member of the National Assembly
- Incumbent
- Assumed office 15 April 2021
- Constituency: 23rd MMC – Sofia
- In office 27 October 2014 – 26 January 2017
- Constituency: 23rd MMC – Sofia
- In office 25 June 2005 – 25 June 2009
- Constituency: 23rd MMC – Sofia

Leader of the Democrats for a Strong Bulgaria
- Incumbent
- Assumed office 10 June 2017
- Preceded by: Radan Kanev
Other offices
Director of the State Agency for National Security
In office 8 December 1997 – 14 December 2001
Prime Minister	Ivan Kostov
Preceded by	Vladimir Manolov
Succeeded by	Ivan Drashkov
Secretary of the Ministry of Interior
In office 8 September 1997 – 8 September 1998
Prime Minister	Ivan Kostov
Minister	Bogomil Bonev

Personal details
- Born: Atanas Petrov Atanasov; 17 May 1959 (age 67) Batin, PR Bulgaria
- Party: DSB (since 2004)
- Other political affiliations: SDS (until 2004)
- Spouse(s): Anelia Atanasova (div. 2006) Vesela Mihova (m. 2007)
- Children: 4
- Education: Sofia University
- Occupation: Politician; lawyer

Atanas Petrov Atanasov (Bulgarian: Атанас Петров Атанасов, born 17 May 1959) is a Bulgarian politician who is currently serving as Member of the National Assembly. A member of the DSB party, which he also leads, Atansov previously served as Member of the Sofia City Council from 2011 to 2014 and Director of the State Agency for National Security from 1997 to 2001.

== Biography ==
Atanasov was born on 17 May 1959 at Batin, Ruse, Bulgaria. He graduated from Sofia University. He worked as a judge in Ruse (1987–1988) and a prosecutor in Razgrad (1989–1992). From 1992 to 1995, Atanasov was the regional director of Minister of Interior at Razgrad. He became a lawyer.

In 1997, Atanasov briefly became the Secretary of the Minister of Interior. He was also the director of the SANS for a year. He resigned from the post of Secretary and he became the director of the SANS. He became a Major General. He began to be in politics. On 10 December 1999, he provided Kostov a list of 226 people who were corrupt. Due to this, ten of the ministers were fired, including Bogomil Bonev, Mario Tagarinski, and Alexander Bozhkov. On 5 December 2001, his list was quoted on a presidential debate, leading many to not support him.

On 14 December 2001, he resigned as the director of the SANS. He then was involved in public activities. He was a member of the Dialog Club, which later became the DSB (2004). He was an MP for the DSB (2005–2009). Since 2006, he has been the regional chairman of the DSB in Sofia. He became the chairman of the DSB since 10 June 2017.

In 2009, Atanasov did not have a seat yet, but he was appointed director of the Information Services AD until August 2010, being replaced by Dyankov. In 2011, he became a local councilman for Sofia, being part of the Blue Coalition. In October 2014, he became an MP from the Reformist Bloc.

He became chairman of the DSB on 10 June 2017.

On 12 April 2018, as chairman, he co-founded an electoral alliance called Democratic Bulgaria. He was elected as the deputy speaker of the 45th and the 46th National Assembly.

== See also ==
- July 2021 Bulgarian parliamentary election
