= Bozhidar Bozhanov =

Bulgarian politician from the Yes Bulgaria!

- Божидар Божанов
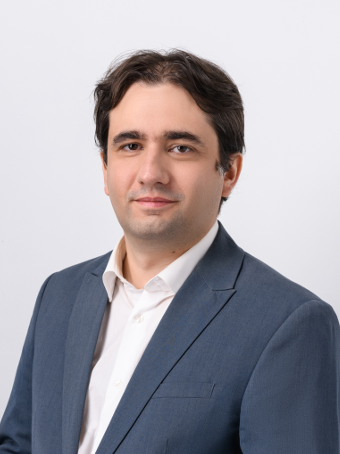
- Official portrait, 2023

Member of the National Assembly
- Incumbent
- Assumed office 19 October 2022
- Constituency: 23rd MMC - Sofia

Minister of Electronic Governance
- In office 13 December 2021 – 2 August 2022
- Prime Minister: Kiril Petkov
- Preceded by: Position established
- Succeeded by: Georgi Todorov

Leader of Yes, Bulgaria!
- Incumbent
- Assumed office 27 April 2025 Serving with Ivaylo Mirchev
- Preceded by: Hristo Ivanov

Personal details
- Born: August 19, 1987 (age 39) Burgas, PR Bulgaria
- Party: Yes, Bulgaria!
- Education: University of London
- Occupation: Politician

Bozhidar Plamenov Bozhanov (born 19 August 1987) is a Bulgarian programmer, entrepreneur politician and co-leader of the Yes Bulgaria! party. He was the Minister of Electronic Governance from 13 December 2021 to 2 August 2022. He is a member of the 47th, 48th, 49th, 50th, and the 51st National Assembly.

== Biography ==
Bozhidar Bozhanov was born on 19 August 1987 in Burgas, and grew up in Dimitrovgrad. In 2006, he graduated from the mathematical high school in Dimitrovgrad, and in 2011, he completed his studies in computer and information systems at Goldsmiths College, part of the University of London. Following that, he worked as a software engineer in Sofia and Amsterdam.

He is involved with the non-governmental organization "Obshtestvo.bg", which promotes e-government. In 2015–2016, he served as an advisor on these matters to deputy prime minister Rumyana Bachvarova in the second government of Boyko Borissov. In early 2017, he was among the founders of Yes Bulgaria! and was elected as a member of its Executive Council.

In 2021 Bozhanov actively participated in several election campaigns of the coalition Democratic Bulgaria, which includes Yes Bulgaria!. As a result, he was elected as an MP to the 47th National Assembly in the November elections. On December 13, he became one of the representatives of "Democratic Bulgaria" in the coalition government led by Kiril Petkov, where he headed the newly established Ministry of Electronic Governance.

In February 2025, Bozhanov voluntarily renounced his parliamentary immunity and on 27 March he was charged with malfeasance in connection with a public procurement from the time he was a minister. It is part of a campaign by the caretaker Prosecutor General Borislav Sarafov against leaders of the opposition coalition "We Continue the Change – Democratic Bulgaria". At the same time, Bozhanov became one of the candidates for a new chairman of "Yes, Bulgaria!" after the withdrawal of the party's founder, Hristo Ivanov.
