= Ivaylo Mirchev =

Bulgarian politician (born 1980)

- Ивайло Мирчев
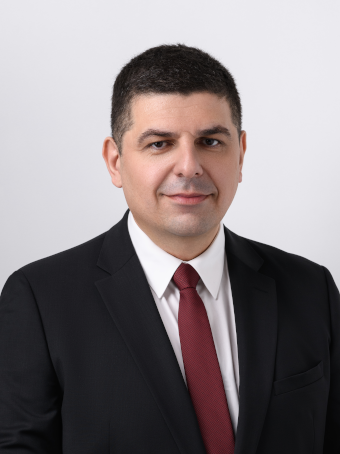
- Mirchev in 2023

Member of the National Assembly
- Incumbent
- Assumed office 11 December 2024
- Constituency: 23rd MMC
- In office 15 April 2021 – 18 June 2024
- Constituency: 24th MMC (2021); Burgas (2021–2022); Razgrad (2022–2023); Dobrich (2023–2024)

Leader of Yes, Bulgaria!
- Incumbent
- Assumed office 27 April 2025 Serving with Bozhidar Bozhanov
- Preceded by: Hristo Ivanov

Personal details
- Born: 6 May 1980 (age 45)
- Party: Yes, Bulgaria!

Ivaylo Nikolaev Mirchev (Bulgarian: Ивайло Николаев Мирчев; born 6 May 1980) is a Bulgarian politician, who is the current co-leader of the party Yes, Bulgaria! along with Bozhidar Bozhanov. He has been a member of the National Assembly since 2024, having previously served from 2021 to 2024. From August to September 2021, he served as chairman of the committee on digitalization, e-government and information technology.
