= 51st National Assembly of Bulgaria =

November 2024 legislature in Bulgaria

51st National Assembly 51-то Народно събрание

History
- Founded: 11 November 2024
- Disbanded: 30 April 2026
- Preceded by: 50th National Assembly
- Succeeded by: 52nd National Assembly

Leadership
- Speaker: Raya Nazaryan (GERB-SDS)
- Deputy Speakers: Kostadin Angelov (GERB-SDS); Atanas Atanasov (PP-DB); Tsoncho Ganev (Revival); Dragomir Stoynev (BSP-OL); Hayri Sadukov (APS); Nikoleta Kuzmanova (ITN); Radostin Vasilev (MECh); Juliana Mateeva (Velichie)

Structure
- Seats: 240
- Political groups: Government (Zhelyazkov Government) (102) GERB–SDS (66) BSP–OL (19) ITN (16) Supported by (35) DPS–NN (29) (Note: Delyan Peevski, leader of DPS–NN, has committed to supporting the government, though there is no official coalition agreement.) Independent (6) Opposition (104) PP–DB (36) (Note: PP–DB, has committed to supporting the government when it comes to Bulgaria's accession to the eurozone, while being in opposition.) Revival (33) APS (Note: The parliamentary group was renamed from Democracy, Rights and Freedoms-DPS, to Alliance for Rights and Freedoms as a result of a National Assembly decision) (14) MECh (11) Velichie (10)

Meeting place
- "The Party House", Sofia

Website
- parliament.bg/en

The Fifty First National Assembly (Bulgarian: Петдесет и първото народно събрание) is a convocation of the National Assembly of Bulgaria, formed according to the results of the snap parliamentary elections in Bulgaria, held on 27 October 2024.

== Positions and Leadership ==
=== National Assembly speaker and deputy speakers ===
==== Speaker elections ====
The opening session of the 51st National Assembly, as per tradition, was chaired by the oldest MP, Silvi Kirilov from ITN, who had also chaired the opening session of the preceding parliament.

Five candidacies were presented for the Speakership in the first attempt to elect a speaker: former Speaker of the 50th National Assembly, Raya Nazaryan, from GERB-SDS, former minister of regional development and PP-DB MP Andrey Tsekov, Revival MP Petar Petrov, BSP MP Natalia Kiselova, and ITN MP Nikoleta Kuzmanova. During the voting, most parliamentary groups voted along party lines, with the exception of MECh and APS, who voted in support of all candidates with the exception of Nazaryan, while DPS-NN voted against all the candidates. Ultimately, Raya Nazaryan and Andrey Tsekov proceeded into a second round, in which neither candidate managed to gain the necessary support for a majority. Following the failure of the first attempt to elect a speaker, ITN representative Toshko Yordanov called for the election of the oldest MP, Silvi Kirilov, as a temporary chairman in order to enable the function of the National Assembly, as had previously occurred with the election of Vezhdi Rashidov in the 48th National Assembly.

A second attempt at electing a speaker was scheduled for 13 November. The same 5 candidates were nominated, indicating that no deal had been made between the political parties in the preceding day. All the candidates received a similar number of votes as to the first attempt, with neither Nazaryan nor Tsekov being able to gain the votes necessary for a majority.

A third attempt was undertaken on 15 November with a similar outcome, although, unlike in prior rounds, ITN nominated Silvi Kirilov (who had been chairing the proceedings as the oldest MP) and MECh changed their position from voting in favour of all non-GERB candidates to abstaining.

On 20 November, a fourth attempt to elect a speaker was undertaken. Prior to the vote, PP-DB announced that they would withdraw the candidacy of Andrey Tsekov and instead support the candidacy of Silvi Kirilov from ITN. Thus, four candidacies were initially nominated: Raya Nazaryan from GERB-SDS, Petar Petrov from Revival, Natalia Kiselova from BSP - OL and Silvi Kirilov from ITN. Presenting the candidacy of Kirilov, ITN MP, Toshko Yordanov, implied that the selection of Kirilov may also enable a change in the current Caretaker Government and allow for the operation of parliament until a stable majority is formed. In the vote for the candidacies, a notable split was noted within the PP-DB group: most MPs belonging to PP voted for the candidacy of Silvi Kiilov, while those belonging to Yes, Bulgaria! and DSB abstained. Kirilov ultimately gained 67 votes in the first round, assuring his participation in a second round against Raya Nazaryan who gained 69 votes. In the 2nd round, Silvi Kirilov received 101 votes, which fell short of a majority.

The fifth attempt to elect a speaker took place on 22 November, with the same four candidates being nominated. Following the nomination of the candidates, heated debate took place between, primarily, representatives of ITN and Vazrazdhane on the one hand, and representatives of Yes, Bulgaria! and the BSP on the other. The former accused the two parties of blocking the functioning of the parliament and servicing the interests of Delyan Peevski and Boyko Borisov. The latter, on the other hand, pointed out that the election of a speaker should be contingent on the adoption of a clear legislative program, and further argued that electing Kirilov would absolve GERB of responsibility in the government formation process. During the debates, GERB leader, Boyko Borisov, made clear that he did not intend to withdraw the candidacy of Nazaryan. Due to the high tension caused by the debate, Acting Speaker Kirilov scheduled a 30-minute break before voting. The vote yielded a similar result as in the previous attempt 2 days ago, with Kirilov entering into a runoff with Nazaryan and receiving 101 votes in favour, while Nazaryan received 69.

On 27 November, a sixth attempt to elect a speaker took place, with the same four candidates nominated. Despite appeals by ITN MPs to representatives from BSP, Yes, Bulgaria! and DSB, the vote ended up yielding a similar result, with Nazaryan receiving 69 votes, while Kirilov received 100.

On 28 November, a seventh attempt to elect a speaker took place. The same four candidates as in previous rounds were initially nominated and received similar levels of support as in prior rounds, with Kirilov and Nazaryan proceeding to the second round. The debate became increasingly heated due to clashes between MPs from ITN and Revival on the one hand, and BSP, Yes, Bulgaria! and DSB on the other. Tensions became especially high during the speech of Revival leader,Kostadin Kostadinov, who called DB marginal and dangerous, leading to heckling by Yes, Bulgaria MP, Manol Peykov. The heated nature of debate led to a 30-minute break prior to the first voting round. During the break, Manol Peykov alleged that he was attacked by Revival MP, Slavcho Krumov. Following the first round, which yielded similar results, a long break was scheduled, during which MP Bozhidar Bozhanov claimed that representatives of the Democratic Bulgaria parties had agreed to support Kirilov . During the vote, Kirilov initially received 118 votes, which ITN MP Toshko Yordanov argued constituted a majority as 234 MPs had registered on the opening day (albeit 238 MPs were present in the room during voting). This led to demands for a re-vote, during which, Kirilov received 117 votes, thus conclusively falling short of a majority.

On 29 November, one month after the 51st National Assembly was elected, the parliament undertook an eighth attempt to elect a speaker. Only three candidates were nominated in this attempt after GERB-SDS withdrew the candidacy of Raya Nazaryan: Petar Petrov from Revival, Natalia Kiselova from ITN, and Silvi Kirilov from ITN. During the first round vote, Kirilov once again received the support of MPs from PP, APS, ITN and MECh, meanwhile, Kiselova was supported by MPs from GERB and BSP; thus enabling the two candidates to enter a run-off. Prior to the runoff, MPs from DB lamented that they would not vote for either Kirilov or Kiselova, citing the failure of the previous attempt to elect Kirilov the previous day, as well as the fact that BSP had not signed PP-DBs declaration of a cordon sanitaire against DPS-NN. Ultimately, in the runoff both candidates fell short of a majority: with Kiselova receiving 87 votes in favour, while Kirilov received 99.

On 4 December, the parliament undertook a 9th attempt to elect a speaker. One new candidate was nominated, that being Atanas Atanasov from PP-DB. Ultimately, however, Atanasov did not enter the second round, and received only 56 votes, with a similar outcome to previous attempts in the subsequent runoff between Kiselova and Kirilov. The tenth attempt yielded a similar outcome, albeit Kiselova came close to the majority after DPS-NN voted in her favour, receiving 118 votes.

Finally, on 6 December, after BSP - United Left signed the PP-DB declaration promising a cordon sanitaire against DPS-NN, Natalia Kiselova was elected as speaker with 140 votes (from GERB, PP-DB, BSP-OL and APS).

On 29 October 2025, as part of an agreement within the governing coalition, Nataliya Kiselova resigned as speaker of the National Assembly. Raya Nazaryan, nominated by GERB-SDS, was subsequently elected with the votes of 129 MPs coming from the GERB-SDS, DPS-NN, BSP-UL and ITN parliamentary groups.

==== Deputy Speaker Elections ====
7 deputy speakers were selected promptly after the election of Kiselova as speaker of the National Assembly from the parliamentary groups of GERB-SDS, PP-DB, BSP-OL, DPS, ITN and MECh. The election was boycotted by representatives of DPS-NN, who did not present their own candidate nor were present for the vote.

On 21 March 2025, Chairwoman of the National Assembly, Nataliya Kiselova, dissolved the Parliamentary Group of MECh, meaning the groups representative as deputy speaker, Radostin Vasilev, vacated his position. However, following the re-formation of the MECh Parliamentary Group 26 March, the National Assembly voted to restore Radostin Vasilev as Vice-Speaker. Additionally, Juliana Mateeva was elected as deputy speaker of the National Assembly, nominated by the Velichie parliamentary group, which had been formed following a partial annulment of the election results by the Constitutional Court.

=== Permanent Committees of the National Assembly ===
The chairpersons of each of the permanent committees of the 51st National Assembly are listed below, with all being elected on 22 January, two months after the first session. Representatives of the parliamentary opposition did not receive any positions.

Committee	Chairperson	Parliamentary Group	Term start	Term End
Budget and Fiscal Policy	Delyan Dobrev	GERB-SDS	22 January 2025	30 April 2026
Constitutional and Judicial questions	Anna Aleksandrova	GERB-SDS	22 January 2025	30 April 2026
Economy and Innovations	Petar Kanev	BSP – United Left	22 January 2025	30 April 2026
Energy	Pavela Mitova	ITN	22 January 2025	30 April 2026
Regional policy, development and local government	Nikolay Nankov	GERB-SDS	22 January 2025	30 April 2026
Foreign Affairs	Boyko Borisov	GERB-SDS	22 January 2025	24 January 2025 (Note: Boyko Borisov resigned as chairman of the Foreign Affairs committee on 24 January.)
Foreign Affairs	Yordanka Fandakova	GERB-SDS	24 January 2025	30 April 2026
European Affairs and European finances	Dimitar Gurdev	ITN	22 January 2025	30 April 2026
Defense	Hristo Gadzhev	GERB-SDS	22 January 2025	30 April 2026
National Security and Internal Order	Manoil Manev	GERB-SDS	22 January 2025	30 April 2026
Oversight over the Security Services, special surveillance tools and classified information	Hristo Terziyski (Note: According to the rulebook of the Bulgarian parliament, the chairman of the Security Services Committee is rotational)	GERB-SDS	22 January 2025	29 April 2025
Oversight over the Security Services, special surveillance tools and classified information	Atanas Atanasov	PP-DB	30 April 2025	3 September 2025
Oversight over the Security Services, special surveillance tools and classified information	Zlatan Zlatanov	Revival	3 September 2025	14 January 2026
Oversight over the Security Services, special surveillance tools and classified information	Deyan Dechev	BSP – United Left	14 January 2026	30 April 2026
Agriculture, food and forestry	Sevim Ali	Democracy, Rights and Freedoms	22 January 2025	5 June 2025 (Note: Released from position by a National Assembly vote on June 5, 2025.)
Agriculture, food and forestry	Tsveta Karayancheva	GERB-SDS	5 June 2025	30 April 2026
Labour and Social Policy	Denitsa Sacheva	GERB-SDS	22 January 2025	30 April 2026
Education and Science	Andrey Chorbanov	ITN	22 January 2025	19 December 2025 (Note: Andrey Chorbanov automatically vacated the position after becoming an independent MP on 19 December)
Youth and Sport	Georgi Vulkov	BSP - United Left	22 January 2025	30 April 2026
Healthcare	Kostadin Angelov	GERB-SDS	22 January 2025	30 April 2026
Environment and Water	Dzhevdet Chakarov	Democracy, Rights and Freedoms	22 January 2025	28 May 2025 (Note: Dzhevdet Chakarov automatically vacated the position after becoming an independent MP on 28 May.)
Environment and Water	Mladen Shishkov	GERB-SDS	5 June 2025	30 April 2026
Transport and Communication	Kiril Dobrev	BSP - United Left	22 January 2025	30 April 2026
E-Governance and Informational Technologies	Levent Memish	Democracy, Rights and Freedoms	22 January 2025	5 June 2025
E-Governance and Informational Technologies	Petya Dimitrova	ITN	5 June 2025	30 April 2026
Culture and Media	Toshko Yordanov	ITN	22 January 2025	30 April 2026
Civic engagement and interactions with citizens	Rositsa Kirova	GERB-SDS	22 January 2025	30 April 2026
Human Rights and Religious Freedom	Krasimir Sabev	GERB-SDS	22 January 2025	30 April 2026
Policies concerned with Bulgarians abroad	Stoyan Taslakov	Revival	22 January 2025	30 April 2026
Prevention of corruption	Maya Dimitrova	BSP - United Left	22 January 2025	30 April 2026
Tourism	Taner Ali	Democracy, Rights and Freedoms	22 January 2025	5 June 2025
Tourism	Desislav Taskov	BSP - United Left	5 June 2025	30 April 2026
Demographic policies, children and families	Hasan Ademov	Democracy, Rights and Freedoms	22 January 2025	5 June 2025
Demographic policies, children and families	Iliana Zhekova	GERB-SDS	5 June 2025	30 April 2026

=== Temporary Parliamentary Committees ===
Five temporary parliamentary committees were formed during the tenure of the 51st National Assembly.

==== Rulebook Temporary Committee ====
Traditionally, following the election of a speaker, a temporary committee was formed in order to review the parliament's rulebook. Hristo Gadzhev, from GERB, was elected chairman with 165 votes, including all the MPs present from the GERB-SDS, PP-DB, DPS-NN, BSP-OL and DPS-DPS groups. Tsveta Rangelova (Revival) and Aleksandr Rashev (ITN), were similarly nominated, however did not receive support outside of their own parties and MECh.

A number of amendments were passed in the temporary rulebook committee including: the introduction of mandatory drug and alcohol tests prior to every legislative session, as well as at the initiative of the Speaker or 1/3 of MPs; expansion of the reasons for closed sessions of the National Assembly as well as the ability of MPs to retain their positions in higher education institutions. The amendment concerning mandatory drug and alcohol tests for MPs did not pass in the subsequent plenary session.

==== Water Scarcity Temporary Committee ====
The formation of a temporary committee to investigate the reasons behind water scarcity in Bulgaria was presented by PP-DB MP, Bogdan Bogdanov on 11 December, citing that up to 250,000 Bulgarians were living in municipalities with ongoing water rationing. The formation of the commission was approved unanimously by the present MPs.

Three candidacies were presented for the position of chair of the committee: Bogdan Bogdanov (PP-DB), Kosta Stoyanov (Revival) and Manol Genov (BSP-OL). Manol Genov was elected chair of the commission with 123 votes, coming from the parliamentary groups of GERB-SDS, DPS-NN, BSP-OL and DPS-DPS, with a three-month mandate. Bogdan Bogdanov received 57 votes (from PP-DB, DPS-DPS and MECh) and Kosta Stoyanov received 53 votes (from Revival and ITN). Genov vacated his position following his election as a minister in the Zhelyazkov government.

On 29 January, the parliament voted to elect a new chair of the committee, with three candidacies being presented: Bogdan Bogdanov (PP-DB), Kosta Stoyanov (Revival) and Mladen Shishkov (GERB-SDS). Shishkov was elected as the new chairman of the committee with 110 votes in favour of his candidacy.

On 6 February, the committee held a hearing of the minister for the environment, Manol Genov and minister of regional development, Ivan Ivanov on the state of water reservoirs in the country. This was followed by further hearings of representatives of the ministries of agriculture, healthcare and other relevant organisations.

On 13 March, the National Assembly unanimously voted to extend the functioning of the temporary committee for a further three months. During its tenure, the committee heard from representatives of the state company, "Watering Systems" and "Watercanalproject" about the state of water reservoirs in the country.

On 3 July, the committee published its final report, which contained recommendations in order to improve water supply. The report obliged the government to present an action plan to deal with water scarcity within 3 months, and endorsed a number of measures, including the formation of a unified state institution to manage water resources.

==== Velingrad Animal Plague Temporary Committee ====
A temporary committee was proposed by MECh MP, Borislav Petkov, to investigate the circumstances around the alleged outbreak of plague among sheep in the area of Velingrad. The committee received unanimous support from present MPs, with Borislav Petkov from MECh similarly being unanimously elected as the committee's chairman with a one-month mandate.

During the committees activity, the committee heard from representatives of the ministry of agriculture, as well as the Agency for Food Safety, who insisted on the presence of a plague in the Velingrad municipality. This claim was disputed during the hearings of local farmers and their lawyers, who argued the samples taken by the Agency for Food Safety were deficient, and claimed that the sheep in Velingrad did not show signs of illness.

The functioning of the committee was extended by chairman Borislav Petkov, who cited the need for further investigation of alleged discrepancies in the reports of key agencies, as well as the halting of parliamentary activity due to the winter holiday, as the key factors in the decision.

In its final report, presented at the committee's final session on the 23d of January, the committee recommended that the ministry of agriculture carry out a renewed inspection of the health of the animals in conjunction with EU officials; called for a discussion on the modernisation of existing EU regulations in relation to animal illness and proposed new measures to prevent the spread of disease within livestock in the future.

==== Highway Safety Temporary Committee ====
A temporary committee was proposed by GERB-SDS MP, Manoil Manev, to investigate the circumstances and develop legislative solutions to the high level of road-traffic accidents in Bulgaria, with around 400 Bulgarians dying as a result of such accidents annually. The formation of the committee was supported unanimously by present MPs, with Andrey Runchev (GERB-SDS) being elected as its chairman with a three-month mandate.

The temporary committee passed a number proposals aimed at reducing road-traffic accidents, such as: increasing the fine issued to drivers in the event of non-payment; reducing the maximum alcohol threshold for young and inexperienced drivers, and restricting the possibility of drivers with unpaid fines to have access to technical assistance.

==== Nitrous Oxide and other narcotics Temporary Committee ====
A temporary committee was proposed by MPs from the parliamentary groups of GERB-SDS, PP-DB, BSP-OL, ITN and MECh, in response to the recent increase in the use of various narcotic substances, especially by Bulgarian youths. The committee was criticised by some MPs, specifically from within the BSP-OL parliamentary group, for being unnecessary. The committee passed with 168 votes in favour and 27 votes against, Lachezar Ivanov (GERB-SDS) being elected chairman with a six-month mandate.

During the committee's activity, a hearing was scheduled for representatives of law enforcement agencies, who cited a lack of proper regulation surrounding the legal status of nitrous oxide as a major difficulty in law enforcement activity to reduce its circulation.

The committee submitted its report on 16 September, which recommended a penalty of up to 5 years imprisonment for anyone in possession of nitrous oxide, with the exception of medical or agricultural needs, as well as greater resource for support of addicts.

==== George Soros Temporary Committee ====
A temporary committee to investigate the activities of George Soros, Alexander Soros and NGOs associated with them (such as the Open Society Foundations) in Bulgaria was proposed by Delyan Peevski in November, 2025. It received support from the parliamentary groups of DPS-NN, Revival, BSP-UL, ITN, MECh and Velichie, thus securing a majority. The commission was opposed by PP-DB, who claimed it was meant to imitate a temporary commission proposed by them to investigate the activities of Delyan Peevski.

Only one candidacy was submitted for the chairmanship of the committee: Angel Yanchev, from Revival. Yanchev's candidacy did not receive a majority, therefore meaning the committee did not have an elected chairman.

The first scheduled meeting of the committee did not take place due to a lack of quorum.

== Parliamentary Groups ==
8 parliamentary groups were registered at the opening session of the 51st National Assembly. A 9th Parliamentary Group, Velichie, was registered on 19 March 2025, following the decision of the Constitutional Court to partially annul the preceding elections.

=== GERB-SDS ===
Name of Group	Seats		
Name of Group	Opening Session	After Recalculation	Disbandanment
GERB-SDS	69 / 240	66 / 240	66 / 240

The Parliamentary Group leadership was as follows:

Position	Name	Political Party	Term start	Term End
Parliamentary Group Chair	Boyko Borisov	GERB	6 December 2024	30 April 2026
Parliamentary Group Vice-chair	Temenuzhka Petkova	GERB	6 December 2024	16 January 2025
Parliamentary Group Vice-chair	Denitsa Sacheva	GERB	6 December 2024	30 April 2026
Parliamentary Group Vice-chair	Raya Nazaryan	GERB	6 December 2024	30 April 2026
Parliamentary Group Vice-chair	Rumen Hristov	SDS	6 December 2024	30 April 2026
Parliamentary Group Vice-chair	Kostadin Angelov	GERB	22 January 2025	30 April 2026
Parliamentary Group Secretary	Aleksandar Nenkov	GERB	6 December 2024	14 March 2025
Parliamentary Group Secretary	Hristo Gadzhev	GERB	4 April 2025	30 April 2026

==== Parliamentary group developments ====
The partisan breakdown of the seats within the Parliamentary Group is as follows.

Name of Party	Seats		
Name of Party	Opening Session	After Recalculation	Disbandanment
GERB	67 / 240	63 / 240	64 / 240
SDS	1 / 240	2 / 240	1 / 240
George's Day	1 / 240	1 / 240	1 / 240

On 4 December, GERB MP, Tervel Georgiev, announced that he intended to resign due to his role as a defense attorney. He was replaced as an MP by Fidanka Katsarova, vice-mayor of the "Central" district of Plovdiv, on 12 December.

Eight MPs from the GERB-SDS group resigned their positions in the National Assembly in order to take up ministerial positions within the Zhelyazkov Government.

On 13 March the Constitutional Court ruled that three members of the GERB-SDS parliamentary group: Temenuzhka Petkova (whose term was being served out by Nikola Dzhambazov), Aleksandr Nenkov and Pavlin Yotov, had been elected illegally. Further, as a result of the recalculation of the results, GERB-SDS lost three MPs as a result of the entrance of Velichie into parliament, meaning all three illegally elected MPs had to vacate their seats.

=== PP-DB ===
Name of Group	Seats		
Name of Group	Opening Session	After Recalculation	Disbandanment
PP-DB	37 / 240	36 / 240	36 / 240

The parliamentary group's leadership was as follows:

Position	Name	Political Party	Term start	Term End
Parliamentary Group Chair	Nikolay Denkov	PP	6 December 2024	30 April 2026
Parliamentary Group Chair	Nadezhda Yordanova	Yes, Bulgaria!	6 December 2024	30 April 2026
Parliamentary Group Vice-chair	Bozhidar Bozhanov	Yes, Bulgaria!	6 December 2024	30 April 2026
Parliamentary Group Vice-chair	Lena Borislavova	PP	6 December 2024	30 April 2026
Parliamentary Group Vice-chair	Lyudmila Ilieva	DSB	6 December 2024	30 April 2026
Parliamentary Group Vice-chair	Stoyu Stoev	PP	6 December 2024	30 April 2026
Parliamentary Group Secretary	Tatyana Sultanova-Siveva	PP	6 December 2024	30 April 2026

==== Parliamentary Group developments ====
The partisan breakdown of the Parliamentary Group is as follows:

Party	Seats		
Party	Opening Session	After Recalculation	Disbandanment
PP	18 / 240	18 / 240	18 / 240
Yes, Bulgaria!	11 / 240	11 / 240	11 / 240
DSB	6 / 240	5 / 240	5 / 240
Independent politicians	2 / 240	2 / 240	2 / 240

During the election of the speaker, MPs Yavor Bozhankov and Daniel Lorer, who had previously been affiliated with PP were both expelled from the party after they did not vote in favour of PP-endorsed candidate Silvi Kirilov thus leading to the failure of his election. Despite the end of their affiliation with PP, the two remained members of the PP-DB group due to opposition from Yes, Bulgaria! and DSB to their expulsion from the group as a whole.

On 13 March the Constitutional Court ruled that one member of the PP-DB parliamentary group, Ivaylo Mitkovski, had been elected illegally. As PP-DB lost a seat following the recalculation of the election results due to the entrance of Velichie into the National Assembly, the seat was vacated.

On 30 June, former PP co-leader, Kiril Petkov, resigned as an MP. He was substituted by Vasil Stefanov, from PP, who was sworn in as an MP on 4 July 2025.

=== Revival ===
Name of Group	Seats		
Name of Group	Opening Session	After recalculation	Disbandanment
Revival	35 / 240	33 / 240	33 / 240

The parliamentary group's leadership is as follows:

Position	Name	Political Party	Term start	Term End
Parliamentary Group Chair	Kostadin Kostadinov	Revival	6 December 2024	Incumbent
Parliamentary Group Vice-chair	Petar Petrov	Revival	6 December 2024	Incumbent
Parliamentary Group Secretary	Svetoslav Todorov	Revival	6 December 2024	14 March 2025

==== Parliamentary Group developments ====
On 13 March the Constitutional Court ruled that two member of the Revival parliamentary group: Viktor Papazov and Svetoslav Todorov, had been elected illegally. As Revival lost two seat following the recalculation of the election results due to the entrance of Velichie into the National Assembly, the seats were vacated.

On 1 March, Revival MP Slavcho Krumov died. He was substituted by Viktor Papazov, who had previously served as an MP until 13 March, 2025.

=== DPS- A New Beginning ===
Name of Group	Seats		
Name of Group	Opening Session	After recalculation	Disbandanment
DPS-NN	30 / 240	29 / 240	29 / 240

The parliamentary group's leadership is as follows:

Position	Name	Political Party	Term start	Term End
Parliamentary Group Chair	Delyan Peevski	DPS (Note: Disputed since 8 August 2024.)	6 December 2024	30 April 2026
Parliamentary Group Vice-chair	Bayram Bayram	DPS	6 December 2024	30 April 2026
Parliamentary Group Vice-chair	Erten Anisova	DPS	6 December 2024	30 April 2026
Parliamentary Group Vice-chair	Iskra Mihaylova	DPS	6 December 2024	30 April 2026
Parliamentary Group Vice-chair	Yordan Tsonev	DPS	6 December 2024	30 April 2026
Parliamentary Group Vice-chair	Stanislav Atanasov	DPS	6 December 2024	30 April 2026
Parliamentary Group Vice-chair	Halil Letifov	DPS	6 December 2024	30 April 2026
Parliamentary Group Vice-chair	Hamid Hamid	DPS	6 December 2024	30 April 2026
Parliamentary Group Secretary	Elvan Gyurkash	DPS	6 December 2024	30 April 2026

==== Parliamentary Group developments ====
The partisan breakdown of the Parliamentary Group is as follows:

Party	Seats		
Party	Opening Session	After Recalculation	Disbandanment
DPS	29 / 240	28 / 240	28 / 240
Independent politicians	1 / 240	1 / 240	1 / 240

On 13 March the Constitutional Court ruled that two member of the DPS-NN parliamentary group: Stanislav Atanasov and Metin Kachan, had been elected illegally. As DPS-NN lost one seat following the recalculation of the election results due to the entrance of Velichie into the National Assembly, only one seat was vacated while the other was to be redistributed according to the recalculated preferences. On 14 March, DPS-NN MP, Hamid Hamid, announced that the newly elected MP, Taner Emin, had resigned his seat in favour of Stanislav Atanasov.

=== BSP - United Left ===
Name of Group	Seats		
Name of Group	Opening Session	After recalculation	Disbandanment
BSP-United Left	20 / 240	19 / 240	19 / 240

The parliamentary group's leadership is as follows:

Position	Name	Political Party	Term start	Term End
Parliamentary Group Chair	Atanas Zafirov	BSP	6 December 2024	16 January 2025
Parliamentary Group Chair	Borislav Gutsanov	BSP	6 December 2024	16 January 2025
Parliamentary Group Chair	Dragomir Stoynev	BSP	22 January 2025	11 February 2026
Parliamentary Group Chair	Nataliya Kiselova	BSP	11 February 2026	30 April 2026
Parliamentary Group Vice-chair	Ivan Ivanov	BSP	6 December 2024	16 January 2025
Parliamentary Group Vice-chair	Manol Genov	BSP	6 December 2024	16 January 2025
Parliamentary Group Vice-chair	Kiril Dobrev	BSP	6 December 2024	11 February 2026
Parliamentary Group Vice-chair	Maya Dimitrova	BSP	22 January 2025	11 February 2026
Parliamentary Group Vice-chair	Vladimir Georgiev	BSP	11 February 2026	30 April 2026
Parliamentary Group Vice-chair	Mariyana Boyadzhieva	BSP	11 February 2026	30 April 2026
Parliamentary Group Secretary	Stefan Burdzhev	BSP	6 December 2024	14 February 2025
Parliamentary Group Secretary	Deyan Dechev	BSP	6 December 2024	30 April 2026
Parliamentary Group Secretary	Atanas Atanasov	BSP	6 December 2024	30 April 2026
Parliamentary Group Secretary	Petya Tsankova	BSP	19 February 2025	30 April 2026

==== Parliamentary Group Developments ====
Party	Seats		
Party	Opening Session	After Recalculation	Disbandanment
BSP	18 / 240	17 / 240	17 / 240
Independents	2 / 240	2 / 240	2 / 240

On 16 January, 4 MPs from the BSP-OL parliamentary group, including the two co-chairmen, Atanas Zafirov and Borislav Gutsanov, vacated their seats in the National Assembly due to being ministers in the Zhelyazkov Government. In their place, the parliamentary group voted to elect vice-speaker Dragomir Stoynev as the new chairman of the group, and elected MP Maya Dimitrova as a new vice-chair of the group.

On 14 February, parliamentary group secretary, Stefan Burdzhev, vacated his seat in order to take up the position of deputy-minister of agriculture.

On 13 March the Constitutional Court ruled that one member of the BSP-OL parliamentary group: Andrey Vulchev, had been elected illegally. As BSP-OL lost one seat following the recalculation of the election results due to the entrance of Velichie into the National Assembly the seat was vacated.

On 11 February, Nataliya Kiselova was elected as the new chairwoman of the BSP-United Left parliamentary group, replacing Dragomir Stoynev. Furthermore, parliamentary group vice-chairpersons, Kiril Dobrev and Maya Dimitrova, resigned being replaced by Vladimir Georgiev and Mariyana Boyadzhieva.

=== Alliance for Rights and Freedoms ===
Name of Group	Seats		
Name of Group	Opening Session	After recalculation	Disbandanment
APS	19 / 240	19 / 240	14 / 240

The parliamentary group's leadership is as follows:

Position	Name	Political Party	Term start	Term End
Parliamentary Group Chair	Dzhevdet Chakarov	DPS (Note: Disputed since 16 November 2024.)	6 December 2024	28 May 2025
Parliamentary Group Chair	Hayri Sadukov	DPS	28 May 2025	30 April 2026
Parliamentary Group Vice-chair	Mario Rangelov	DPS	6 December 2024	3 July 2025
Parliamentary Group Vice-chair	Dzheyhan Ibryamov	DPS	6 December 2024	30 April 2026
Parliamentary Group Vice-chair	Sevim Ali	DPS	6 December 2024	30 April 2026
Parliamentary Group Vice-chair	Taner Ali	DPS	6 December 2024	30 April 2026
Parliamentary Group Secretary	Pavlin Krastev	DPS (Note: Disputed since 8 September 2024.)	6 December 2024	30 April 2026

==== Parliamentary Group Developments ====
Party	Seats		
Party	Opening Session	After Recalculation	Disbandanment
DPS	18 / 240	18 / 240	0 / 240
ZNS	1 / 240	1 / 240	1 / 240
APS (Note: Did not exist as a political party until September, 2025)	0 / 240	0 / 240	13 / 240

On 13 March the Constitutional Court ruled that one member of the APS parliamentary group: Esheref Esheref, had been elected illegally. As APS lost no seats following the recalculation of the election results due to the entrance of Velichie into the National Assembly the seat was redistributed according to the recalculated preferences. Esheref's seat was taken up by the newly elected MP, Pavlin Haytov, who was sworn in on the 14th of March.

On 28 May, parliamentary group chairman, Dzhevdet Chakarov, resigned from the parliamentary group and became an independent MP. MP Hayri Sadukov was elected as the new chairman of the parliamentary group.

On 30 May, MP Vanya Vasileva announced her intention to become an independent MP.

On 19 June 2025, the National Assembly voted to approve a rule-book change that forbid parliamentary groups from having the same abbreviation as the name of another political party that had contested the preceding election. This meant that the parliamentary group, previously called Democracy, Rights and Freedoms had to change their name in order to be in compliance. As DRF did not submit a name change, the name of the parliamentary group was automatically assigned as the name of the electoral coalition that had contested the preceding elections, Alliance for Rights and Freedoms.

Он 2 July, MP Myumyun Myumyun announced that he had left the APS parliamentary group. On 3 July, vice-chair of the APS parliamentary group, Mario Rangelov, similarly left the parliamentary group and became an unaffiliated MP.

On 25 February, Edis Daudov was sworn in after a member of the APS parliamentary group- Hasan Ademov- resigned in order to become a member of the Gyurov government. Shortly after being sworn in, Daudov declared his intention to sit as an unaffiliated MP .

=== ITN ===
Name of Group	Seats		
Name of Group	Opening Session	After recalculation	Disbandanment
ITN	18 / 240	17 / 240	16 / 240

The parliamentary group's leadership is as follows:

Position	Name	Political Party	Term start	Term End
Parliamentary Group Chair	Toshko Yordanov	ITN	6 December 2024	30 April 2026
Parliamentary Group Vice-chair	Stanislav Balabanov	ITN	6 December 2024	30 April 2026
Parliamentary Group Secretary	Aleksandr Vulchev	ITN	6 December 2024	30 April 2026
Parliamentary Group Secretary	Pavela Mitova	ITN	6 December 2024	30 April 2026

==== Parliamentary Group Developments ====
On 16 January, ITN MP, Silvi Kirilov, vacated his seat due to becoming a minister in the Zhelyazkov Government.

On 13 March the Constitutional Court ruled that three member of the ITN parliamentary group: Emil Trifonv, Ivan Kyuchukov, and Aleksandr Markov had been elected illegally. As ITN lost one seat following the recalculation of the election results due to the entrance of Velichie into the National Assembly, only one seat was vacated and the other seats were redistributed according to the recalculated preferences. The seats was taken up by the newly elected MPs, Ivaylo Kostadinov and Ivan Klisurski, who were sworn in on 14 March.

On 19 December, ITN MP Andrey Chorbanov left the parliamentary group.

=== MECh ===
Name of Group	Seats		
Name of Group	Opening Session	After recalculation	Disbandanment
MECh	12 / 240	11 / 240	11 / 240

The parliamentary group's leadership is as follows:

Position	Name	Political Party	Term start	Term End
Parliamentary Group Chair	Kiril Veselinski	MECh	6 December 2024	30 April 2026
Parliamentary Group Vice-chair	Ventislav Petkov	MECh	6 December 2024	30 April 2026
Parliamentary Group Vice-chair	Nikolay Radulov	MECh	6 December 2024	30 April 2026
Parliamentary Group Secretary	Deyan Petkov	MECh	6 December 2024	13 March 2025
Parliamentary Group Secretary	Krasimir Donchev	MECh	26 March 2025	30 April 2026

==== Parliamentary Group Developments ====
On 13 March the Constitutional Court ruled that three member of the MECh parliamentary group: Deyan Petkov, Rosen Ivanov, and Borislav Petkov had been elected illegally. As MECh lost one seat following the recalculation of the election results due to the entrance of Velichie into the National Assembly, only one seat was vacated and the other seats were redistributed according to the recalculated preferences. One seat was taken up by the newly elected MP: Samuil Slavov, who was sworn in on 14 March. The other newly elected MP, Iliyan Iliev, announced that he did not intend to take up a seat within the National Assembly.

On 19 March, MP Samuil Slavov announced his intention to resign as an MP, with his resignation being approved on the same day. Following this decision, MECh technically fell under the threshold required for a parliamentary group, leading National Assembly chairwoman Nataliya Kiselova to announce the group as dissolved on 20 March.

The MECh Parliamentary Group was reformed by an exceptional act of the National Assembly on 26 March, following the swearing-in of two new MPs elected from the MECh list: Ivan Ivanov and Plamen Petkov.

=== Velichie ===
Name of Group	Seats		
Name of Group	Opening Session	After recalculation	Disbandanment
Velichie	0 / 240	10 / 240	10 / 240

The parliamentary group's leadership is as follows:

Position	Name	Political Party	Term start	Term End
Parliamentary Group Chair	Ivelin Mihaylov	Velichie	19 March 2025	30 April 2026
Parliamentary Group Vice-chair	Krasimira Kantincharova	Velichie	19 March 2025	30 April 2026
Parliamentary Group Vice-chair	Pavlin Petrov	Velichie	19 March 2025	30 April 2026
Parliamentary Group Secretary	Larisa Savova	Velichie	19 March 2025	30 April 2026
Parliamentary Group Secretary	Stiliana Bobcheva	Velichie	19 March 2025	30 April 2026
