= 52nd National Assembly of Bulgaria =

April 2026 legislature in Bulgaria

52nd National Assembly 52-то Народно събрание

History
- Founded: 30 April 2026
- Preceded by: 51st National Assembly

Leadership
- Speaker: Mihaela Dotsova (PB)
- Deputy Speakers: Ivan Angelov (PB); Raya Nazaryan (GERB-SDS); Atanas Atanasov (DB); Ayten Sabri (DPS); Stoyu Stoev (PP); Tsoncho Ganev (Revival)

Structure
- Seats: 240
- Political groups: Government (Radev Cabinet) (131): PB (131); Opposition (109): GERB–SDS (39); DB (21); DPS (21); PP (16); Revival (12)

Meeting place
- "The Party House", Sofia

Website
- parliament.bg/en

The Fifty Second National Assembly (Bulgarian: Петдесет и второто народно събрание) is a convocation of the National Assembly of Bulgaria, formed according to the results of the 2026 Bulgarian parliamentary election in Bulgaria, held on 19 April 2026.

== Positions and Leadership ==
=== National Assembly speaker and deputy speakers ===
The opening session of the 52nd National Assembly was, as per tradition, presided by the oldest elected MP, that being Gen. Rumen Milanov from Progressive Bulgaria.

Two candidacies were nominated for the Speakership of the National Assembly: Mihaela Dotsova, nominated by Progressive Bulgaria, and Petar Petrov, nominated by Revival. Dotsova was elected as the new speaker with 188 votes in favour, being supported by all MPs from Progressive Bulgaria, GERB-SDS and DPS. Petar Petrov only received 12 votes in favour, from MPs belonging to Revival.

6 deputy speakers were elected unanimously belonging to the 6 parliamentary groups formed after the election of the speaker: Ivan Angelov from Progressive Bulgaria, Raya Nazaryan from GERB-SDS, Ayten Sabri from the DPS, Atanas Atanasov from DB, Stoyu Stoev from PP and Tsoncho Ganev from Revival. Unlike in the previous National Assembly, an MP from the DPS was selected as a deputy speaker.

=== Permanent Committees of the National Assembly ===
The chairpersons of each of the permanent committees of the 52nd National Assembly are listed below, with all being elected on 4 June 2026, almost one month after its convocation.

Committee	Chairperson	Parliamentary Group	Term start	Term End
Budget and Fiscal Policy	Konstantin Prodanov	PB	4 June 2026	Incumbent
Constitutional and Judicial questions	Yanka Tyankova	PB	4 June 2026	Incumbent
Economy and Innovations	Stefan Belchev	PB	4 June 2026	Incumbent
Energy	Rumyana Petrova	PB	4 June 2026	Incumbent
Regional policy, development and local government	Martin Zhlyabnikov	PB	4 June 2026	Incumbent
Foreign Affairs	Petar Vitanov	PB	4 June 2026	Incumbent
European Affairs and European finances	Galin Durev	PB	4 June 2026	Incumbent
Defense	Ivan Lalov	PB	4 June 2026	Incumbent
National Security and Internal Order	Petar Todorov	PB	4 June 2026	Incumbent
Oversight over the Security Services, special surveillance tools and classified information	Rumen Milanov (Note: According to the rulebook of the Bulgarian parliament, the chairman of the Security Services Committee is rotational)	PB	4 June 2026	Incumbent
Agriculture, food and forestry	Yavor Gechev	PB	4 June 2026	Incumbent
Labour and Social Policy	Venko Sabrutev	PP	4 June 2026	Incumbent
Education and Science	Dimitar Zdravkov	PB	4 June 2026	Incumbent
Youth and Sport	Petar Stoychev	PB	4 June 2026	Incumbent
Healthcare	Kostadin Angelov	GERB-SDS	4 June 2026	Incumbent
Environment and Water	Halil Letifov	DPS	4 June 2026	
Transport and Communication	Yordan Ivanov	DB	4 June 2026	Incumbent
Innovation and Digital Transformation	Tomislav Donchev	GERB-SDS	4 June 2026	Incumbent
Culture and Media	Anton Kutev	PB	4 June 2026	Incumbent
Civic engagement and interactions with citizens	Aleksandr Simidchiev	DB	4 June 2026	Incumbent
Human Rights and Religious Freedom	Atidzhe Alieva-Veli	DPS	4 June 2026	Incumbent
Policies concerned with Bulgarians abroad	Angel Georgiev	Revival	4 June 2026	Incumbent
Prevention of corruption	Dimitar Balev	PB	4 June 2026	Incumbent
Tourism	Rositsa Kirova	GERB-SDS	4 June 2026	Incumbent

=== Temporary Parliamentary Commissions ===
==== Rule book Temporary Commission ====
Following the election of a speaker, a temporary commission was formed to review the rule book of the National Assembly. Dimitar Zdrakvov, from PB, was elected unanimously as the commissions chairman. Unlike in previous National Assemblies, the temporary rule book commission was formed not on the basis of parity, but proportional to the number of seats held by each parliamentary group. This change was supported by the PB, GERB-SDS, DPS groups, meanwhile it was opposed by the DB, PP and Revival groups. As a result of the change, PB held 9 seats in the commission, GERB-SDS held 3, while all other parliamentary groups were allocated 1.

== Parliamentary Groups ==
6 parliamentary groups were registered in the 52nd National Assembly. Despite contesting the preceding elections together, PP and parties which composed Democratic Bulgaria formed two separate parliamentary groups.

=== Progressive Bulgaria ===
Name of Group	Seats
Name of Group	Opening Session
Progressive Bulgaria	131 / 240

The Parliamentary Group leadership was as follows:

Position	Name	Political Party	Term start	Term End
Parliamentary Group Chair	Petar Vitanov	Progressive Bulgaria (Note: The affiliation of Petar Vitanov with the BSP is unclear, but he contested the preceding elections as part of Progressive Bulgaria.)	30 April 2026	Incumbent
Parliamentary Group Vice-chair	Vladimir Nikolov	Progressive Bulgaria	30 April 2026	Incumbent
Parliamentary Group Vice-chair	Galin Durev	Progressive Bulgaria (Note: The affiliation of Galin Durev with the BSP is unclear, but he contested the preceding elections as part of Progressive Bulgaria.)	30 April 2026	Incumbent
Parliamentary Group Vice-chair	Olga Borissova	Progressive Bulgaria	30 April 2026	Incumbent
Parliamentary Group Vice-chair	Slavi Vassilev	Progressive Bulgaria	30 April 2026	Incumbent
Parliamentary Group Secretary	Asen Babachev	Progressive Bulgaria	30 April 2026	Incumbent
Parliamentary Group Secretary	Svetla Kodzhabasheva	Progressive Bulgaria	30 April 2026	Incumbent

=== GERB-SDS ===
Name of Group	Seats
Name of Group	Opening Session
GERB-SDS	39 / 240

The Parliamentary Group leadership was as follows:

Position	Name	Political Party	Term start	Term End
Parliamentary Group Chair	Boyko Borissov	GERB	30 April 2026	Incumbent
Parliamentary Group Vice-chair	Denitsa Sacheva	GERB	30 April 2026	Incumbent
Parliamentary Group Vice-chair	Kostadin Angelov	GERB	30 April 2026	Incumbent
Parliamentary Group Vice-chair	Rumen Hristov	SDS	30 April 2026	Incumbent
Parliamentary Group Secretary	Aleksandr Ivanov	GERB	30 April 2026	Incumbent

=== DPS ===
Name of Group	Seats
Name of Group	Opening Session
DPS	21 / 240

The Parliamentary Group leadership was as follows:

Position	Name	Political Party	Term start	Term End
Parliamentary Group Chair	Delyan Peevski	DPS	30 April 2026	Incumbent
Parliamentary Group Vice-chair	Ayten Sabri	DPS	30 April 2026	Incumbent
Parliamentary Group Vice-chair	Iskra Mihaylova	DPS	30 April 2026	Incumbent
Parliamentary Group Vice-chair	Halil Letifov	DPS	30 April 2026	Incumbent
Parliamentary Group Vice-chair	Hamid Hamid	DPS	30 April 2026	Incumbent
Parliamentary Group Secretary	Fatima Yaldas	DPS	30 April 2026	Incumbent

=== Democratic Bulgaria ===
Name of Group	Seats
Name of Group	Opening Session
DB	21 / 240

The Parliamentary Group leadership was as follows:

Position	Name	Political Party	Term start	Term End
Parliamentary Group Chair	Nadezhda Yordanova	Yes, Bulgaria!	30 April 2026	Incumbent
Parliamentary Group Vice-chair	Bozhidar Bozhanov	Yes, Bulgaria!	30 April 2026	Incumbent
Parliamentary Group Vice-chair	Katya Paneva	DSB	30 April 2026	Incumbent
Parliamentary Group Secretary	Aleksandra Sterkova	Yes, Bulgaria!	30 April 2026	Incumbent
Parliamentary Group Secretary	Aleksandra Sterkova	DSB	30 April 2026	Incumbent

=== We Continue the Change ===
Name of Group	Seats
Name of Group	Opening Session
PP	16 / 240

The Parliamentary Group leadership was as follows:

Position	Name	Political Party	Term start	Term End
Parliamentary Group Chair	Nikolay Denkov	PP	30 April 2026	Incumbent
Parliamentary Group Vice-chair	Ivaylo Shopov	PP	30 April 2026	Incumbent
Parliamentary Group Vice-chair	Tatyana Sultanova-Siveva	PP	30 April 2026	Incumbent
Parliamentary Group Secretary	Ivo Mihaylov	PP	30 April 2026	Incumbent

=== Revival ===
Name of Group	Seats
Name of Group	Opening Session
Revival	12 / 240

The Parliamentary Group leadership was as follows:

Position	Name	Political Party	Term start	Term End
Parliamentary Group Chair	Kostadin Kostadinov	Revival	30 April 2026	Incumbent
Parliamentary Group Vice-chair	Petar Petrov	Revival	30 April 2026	Incumbent
Parliamentary Group Secretary	Angel Yanchev	Revival	30 April 2026	Incumbent
