= Tsoncho Ganev =

Bulgarian politician (born 1979)

- Цончо Ганев
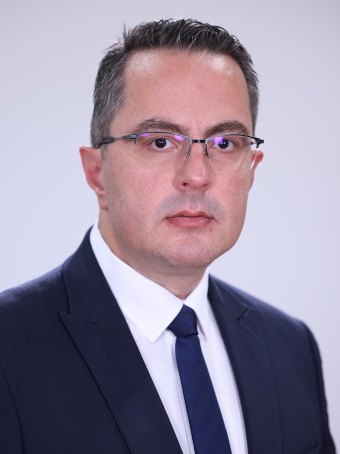
- Ganev in 2026

Deputy Speaker of the National Assembly
- Incumbent
- Assumed office 3 December 2021
- Speaker: Nikola Minchev; Vezhdi Rashidov; Rosen Zhelyazkov; Raya Nazaryan; Nataliya Kiselova; Raya Nazaryan; Mihaela Dotsova
- Preceded by: Tatyana Doncheva

Member of the National Assembly
- Incumbent
- Assumed office 3 December 2021
- Constituency: 2nd MMC – Burgas

Member of the Varna City Council
- In office 11 November 2019 – 25 November 2021

Personal details
- Born: 11 March 1979 (age 47) Sofia, PR Bulgaria
- Party: Revival
- Other political affiliations: VMRO (until 2012)
- Children: 1
- Education: D. A. Tsenov Academy of Economics
- Occupation: Politician; entrepreneur

Tsoncho Tomov Ganev (Bulgarian: Цончо Томов Ганев; born 11 March 1979) is a Bulgarian entrepreneur and politician, Member of the National Assembly and Deputy Chairman in the 47th, 48th, 49th, 50th, and 51st National Assembly, and co-founder of the far-right and ultranationalist Revival party. Deputy Chairman of the Revival party, from which he was a municipal councillor in Varna in 2019 – 2021. Previously, he was a member of VMRO-BND and a regional deputy mayor in Varna (2012 – 2015).

== Biography ==
Tsoncho Ganev was born on 11 March 1979 in Sofia. He lived in Petrich for the first 8 years, then his family moved to the capital. As a child, he was passionate about volleyball, he enrolled in the sports school, where he received his secondary education.

He received his higher education at the “Dimitar A. Tsenov” Academy of Economics in Svishtov, majoring in “Trade Economics”. He founded his first company, which worked in the field of tourism in the Golden Sands resort – Holiday 2001 Ltd., which was later managed by his wife Alexandra. He also held managerial positions in international companies, one of which was Devnya Cement.

He entered the executive branch in January 2012, when he became Deputy Mayor of the “Mladost” district in Varna, with the portfolio of Territorial Development. He left in October 2015.

In 2014, he became one of the founders of the Revival party. He became the vice-chairman and part of the National Committee and the Organization Council of the party. In the 2019 local elections, was elected as a candidate of the Revival party for municipal councillor in Varna.

In the parliamentary elections in Bulgaria in November 2021, as a candidate for MP, he was the leader of the lists of the Revival party for 2nd MMC – Burgas and 1st MMC – Blagoevgrad. He was elected as a member of parliament from 2nd MMC – Burgas. He was also elected to the next four parliaments, and in all of which he was the deputy speaker of the National Assembly from the Revival party quota.

== Criticism ==
As a member of the 49th National Assembly, on 1 June 2023, during a plenary session, he spat on his opponent. The next day, he declared that they would not let their opponents, MPs from the We Continue the Change – Democratic Bulgaria coalition Manol Peykov and Yavor Bozhankov, speak from the parliamentary rostrum.

On 4 June 2025, the day of the release of the convergence report on Bulgaria’s accession to the Eurozone, Tsoncho Ganev physically assaulted his fellow MP Yavor Bozhankov.

Ganev is often associated with pro-Russian organizations and is a vocal supporter of Bulgaria’s adherence to Russia and its sphere of influence. He is an outspoken opponent of the European Union and the Eurozone.
