= 49th National Assembly of Bulgaria =

2023 legislature in Bulgaria

49th National Assembly 49-то Народно събрание

History
- Founded: April 12, 2023
- Disbanded: June 19, 2024
- Preceded by: 48th National Assembly
- Succeeded by: 50th National Assembly

Leadership
- Speaker: Rosen Zhelyazkov (GERB—SDS) (Note: Ousted by a no-confidence vote on April 25, 2024. Deputy Speaker Rositsa Kirova proceeded to serve as Speaker pro tempore until the dissolution of the Assembly on June 19, 2024.)
- Deputy Speakers: Rositsa Kirova; Nikola Minchev; Tsoncho Ganev; Filiz Hyusmenova; Kristian Vigenin; Andrey Chorbanov

Structure
- Seats: 240
- Political groups: Government (132) GERB-SDS (69) PP-DB (63) Confidence and supply (36) DPS (36) Opposition (72) Revival (34) BSP (23) ITN (11) Independent (4) (Note: Former members of: Revival (3) PP-DB (1))

Meeting place
- National Assembly Building, Sofia

Website
- parliament.bg

The Forty-Ninth National Assembly (Bulgarian: Четиридесет и деветото народно събрание) was a convocation of the National Assembly of Bulgaria, formed according to the results of the early parliamentary elections in Bulgaria, held on 2 April 2023. It was replaced by the 50th National Assembly, summoned by the President on the 17th of June.

== Speakership selection ==
Despite each parliamentary group having the right to nominate a candidate for the Speakership role, it was contested only between GERB’s Rosen Zhelyazkov and Revival’s Petar Petrov. The process failed twice due to Petrov only receiving the support of his own party and Zhelyazkov not getting enough votes. The problem was resolved after PP-DB agreed to back Zhelyazkov's candidacy, with the agreement for him to switch places with Nikola Minchev in three months time. This was later changed, after the two parties agreed to a rotation government, in which the Prime Ministers would switch places simultaneously as the Speakers of the National Assembly.

== Government formation ==
With Bulgaria being in the middle of an already 2-year-lasting political crisis, the GERB-SDS and PP-DB parliamentary groups decided to disregard their differences and embrace their common pro-European goals. The solution was to be a rotation government, many of whose Ministers were to be Independent experts. The respective nominees for Prime Minister were Mariya Gabriel, the European Commissioner for Innovation, Research, Culture, Education and Youth and Nikolay Denkov, a former Minister of Education and Science. After long negotiations, Nikolay Denkov was sworn in as Prime Minister on June 6, 2023, while Gabriel assumed the role of his Deputy and Minister of Foreign Affairs. The two would switch places in nine months time. The main goals of the new Government were Bulgaria joining both the Schengen area and the Eurozone, as well as other legislative initiatives, such as a constitutional amendment in regards to the judicial branch in Bulgaria.

== Independents ==
The parliamentary group of Revival party initially won 37 seats in the National Assembly. However, 3 members later left the group, reducing their number of seats to 34. Similarly, the coalition PP-DB, which secured 64 seats, experienced the departure of 1 member, leaving them with 63 seats.
