= Viktoria Vassileva =

Bulgarian economist and politician

- Виктория Василева

Member of the National Assembly
- Incumbent
- Assumed office 20 June 2024
- Constituency: 26th MMC – Sofia-province
- In office 4 April 2021 – 13 July 2022
- Constituency: 10th MMC – Kyustendil (2021); 1st MMC – Blagoevgrad (2021-2022)
- In office 7 May 1997 – 19 April 2001

Personal details
- Born: 27 October 1971 (age 54) Ruse, Bulgaria
- Party: It Makes Sense
- Other political affiliations: SDS (1997–2003); ITN (2020–2022); Velichie (2024)
- Occupation: Politician, economist

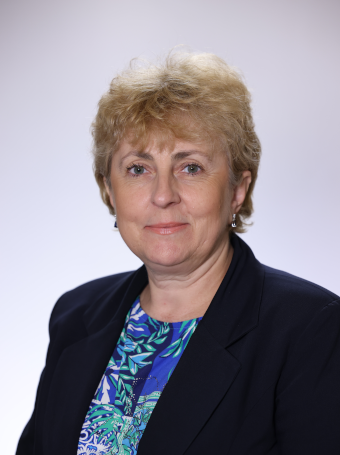

Viktoria Dimitrova Vassileva (Bulgarian: Виктория Димитрова Василева; born 27 October 1971) is a Bulgarian economist and politician, Member of the National Assembly (MP) on the list of the United Democratic Forces (UDF) in the XXXVIII National Assembly and on the list of the There is Such a People (ITN) in the XLV, XLVI and XLVII National Assemblies. On 13 July 2022, she left the ITN political party and the National Assembly.

== Early life, education and career ==
Victoria Vassileva was born on 27 October 1971, in Ruse, People's Republic of Bulgaria. She graduated from the English Language High School "Geo Milev" – Ruse in 1990.

She worked for Slavi Trifonov's company 7/8 TV as head of administration in Slavi's Show until the show's finale in 2019.

== Political career ==
=== UDF youth wing ===
At the early parliamentary elections in 1997, she was elected from the list of the United Democratic Forces (UDF) to the 38th National Assembly.

Until 2003, she was part of the leadership of the UDF youth.

=== Association with Slavi Trifonov & ITN ===
She represented the Initiative Committee that initiated the 2016 referendum.

In 2021, she was the secretary general of There is Such a Nation (ITN) and in charge of the party's structures. Vassileva was referred to as one of the closest people to Slavi Trifonov.

In the parliamentary elections of the same year, she was elected from the ITN list as a deputy to the 45th National Assembly from the 10th MMC – Kyustendil. She was elected deputy speaker of the National Assembly and vice-chair of the parliamentary group.

At the early parliamentary elections in July 2021 she was elected as a member of parliament for ITN in the 46th National Assembly from the same multi-member constituency. She was re-elected as deputy speaker of the National Assembly and vice-chair of the ITN parliamentary group. In her tenure as an MP, she was a member of the "Committee on Internal Security and Public Order". In August 2021, she shared her disbelief that the other parties really wanted a coalition agreement and called the debates in the National Assembly a "circus."

In the early parliamentary elections in November 2021, she was elected as an ITN MP to the 47th National Assembly from the 1st MMC – Blagoevgrad. She was a vice-chair of the parliamentary group, as well as a member of the Foreign Policy Committee and the Internal Security and Public Order Committee. She was chosen as a member of the Delegation to the Parliamentary Assembly of the Organisation for Security and Cooperation in Europe.

Vassileva participated in the coalition negotiations during the formation of the Petkov Government.

She left ITN shortly after the dissolution of the 47th National Assembly.

=== Association with Nikolay Markov & Velichie ===
In the 2024 Bulgarian parliamentary election, Viktoria Vasileva was selected as the lead candidate for the newly formed party Velichie in Sofia-Province. In an interview with the outlet 24 Chasa, Vasileva says she was invited to join the list by Nikolay Markov, with whom she agreed on a number of topics.

Vasileva was one of the elected Velichie MPs as a result of the elections. Some media outlets ascribed the surprise success of the party to Vasileva's organisational connections from her days in the UDF and ITN, although she herself has denied such claims.

During the convocation of the parliament, Vasileva was chosen as the vice-chairwoman of the Velichie parliamentary group and delivered the traditional opening remarks on behalf of the party. She was later nominated to be deputy-speaker by the Velichie Group.

Vasileva turned into a source of controversy within the group, when the party's founder, Ivelin Mihaylov, demanded her expulsion from the group, alleging that she was aligned with GERB. She however did not comment Mihaylov's statements, and claimed that she did not know who Mihaylov was. Vasileva further stated that she had received death threats, although she did not comment from whom.

Ultimately, the Velichie parliamentary group ended up being dissolved. The dissolution of the parliamentary group led to Vasileva's tenure as Vice-Speaker ending prematurely.

=== Foundation of "It Makes Sense" ===
On 16 August, Viktoria Vassileva held an initiative committee meeting for the party "It Makes Sense". The party, led by Viktoria Vassileva, purports to fights apathy, and corruption.

The party attempted to contest the October 2024 Bulgarian parliamentary election together with the Bulgarian Social Democratic Party and Be Brave, however, the Central Electoral Commission rejected its application due to inconsistencies in the provided documents.
