= Nataliya Kiselova =

Bulgarian politician (born 1977)

- Наталия Киселова
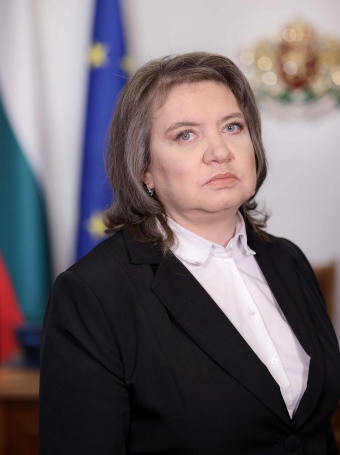
- Official portrait, 2024

Speaker of the National Assembly
- In office 6 December 2024 – 29 October 2025
- Preceded by: Raya Nazaryan
- Succeeded by: Raya Nazaryan

Member of the National Assembly
- Incumbent
- Assumed office 11 November 2024
- Constituency: 23rd MMC - Sofia

Personal details
- Born: Nataliya Vasileva Kiselova; 19 June 1977 (age 49) Kazanlak, PR Bulgaria
- Party: Independent
- Other political affiliations: BSP–OL (since 2024)
- Education: Sofia University (LL.B, LL.M, PhD)
- Occupation: Jurist; lecturer; politician

Nataliya Vasileva Kiselova (Bulgarian: Наталия Василева Киселова, born 19 June 1977) is a Bulgarian jurist and politician who serves as a member of the National Assembly from the BSP – United Left (BSP–OL) parliamentary group. She further served as the Speaker of the National Assembly between 6 December 2024 and 29 October 2025. Kiselova is also a professor of constitutional law at Sofia University.

== Early life, education and career ==
She was born on the 19 June 1977, in Kazanlak. She graduated from the high school, "Saint Cyril and Metodi", specialising in humanities, before attending Sofia University for Law. Kiselova graduated with a degree in "Law" with a specialisation on "administration of justice" and "public administration" in 2002. From 2003 to 2005, Kiselova was a PhD candidate at Sofia University. She successfully defended her PhD dissertation in the topic of "parliamentary control" in 2007 and received a doctorate in Constitutional Law in 2008. Kiselova further specialised by attending Moscow State University in 2014.

=== Constitutional Law expert ===
Kiselova became an instructor of constitutional law within the Law Faculty of Sofia University in 2005 and has been responsible for teaching various courses on the subject since then. She has also taught courses in constitutional law in the Academy of the Ministry of Interior. From 2011 to 2012, she served as the scientific secretary of the Law Faculty of Sofia University. Kiselova published a monograph in 2017 titled "The Political Rights of Bulgarian Citizens", which focuses on the fundamental political rights which Bulgarian citizens hold. Besides the monograph, she has written and published a number of articles on the topic of Bulgarian constitutional law.

Kiselova has played an advisory role as an expert in Constitutional Law to a number of state institutions. From 2006 to 2009, she was designated an expert to the state administration commission of the 40th National Assembly. Between 2010 and 2012, she was designated a state expert to the "legislation council" department of the Ministry of Justice. From 2012 to 2016, Kiselova was an advisor on judicial questions to President Rosen Plevneliev. In 2016, she was appointed secretary of justice to President Plevneliev, serving until the end of Plevneliev's term in 2017.

During the Bulgarian political crisis, Kiselova became a frequent guest on TV, commenting ongoing political events from a legal perspective. In this role, she often commented on the constitutionality of the actions undertaken by political forces, as well as the implications of various court rulings. Specifically, Kiselova became prominent in the aftermath of a plagiarism scandal concerning ITN-proposed minister Petar Iliev. In her interviews, she consistently expressed skepticism about the constitutional changes proposed by the Denkov Government for excessively disrupting the balance of power between institutions. She further criticised the election of two new constitutional justices by the 49th National Assembly as rushed and potentially unconstitutional.

== Political career ==
Prior to the October 2024 Bulgarian parliamentary election, Nataliya Kiselova was nominated by the Sofia organisation of the BSP as part of the civic quota for the future BSP–OL coalition list in Sofia. Kiselova accepted the nomination. In an interview with 24Chasa, Kiselova justified her entrance into electoral politics by noting that she believed she could accomplish more within parliament, then as an outside expert and praised the BSP for their role as a "systemic" party that defended the values of parliamentary democracy. Following the elections, Kiselova was elected to serve as an MP representing the 23d MMC-Sofia.

Kiselova was nominated to be the speaker of the 51st National Assembly by BSP–OL. Speaking after her nomination, Kiselova underlined that the BSP had always been a supporter of parliamentarism and urged all the parliamentary parties to unite around a common ideal of defending the constitutional order of Bulgaria.

In the initial voting rounds to elect a speaker, Kiselova consistently received support from MP's belonging to the BSP–OL, APS and MECh political groupings, despite this she was disqualified in the 1st round during the first 8 attempts. On 29 November, prior to the 8th attempt to elect a speaker, GERB-SDS surprisingly chose to withdraw the candidacy of Raya Nazaryan, and instead endorsed the candidacy of Kiselova. Despite GERB's support enabling Kiselova's qualification into the 2nd round, she did not receive a majority.

During the 9th attempt to elect a speaker, Kiselova surprisingly received the support of DPS-Peevski in the 2nd round, despite the BSP consistently excluding DPS-Peevski from negotiations. In response, Kiselova stated that she had not personally searched for support for her candidacy from DPS-Peevski, and promised to resign as Speaker if her election was secured with their votes. On 6 December, Kiselova was elected the speaker of the National Assembly, with 140 votes from GERB-SDS, PP-DB, BSP–OL, and APS. In her victory speech, Kiselova thanked the MPs for their presence and expressed hopes that Bulgaria may have a stable government.

=== Speaker of the National Assembly ===
One of the questions following the election of Kiselova was her stance concerning her potential role as a caretaker Prime Minister, due to the Speakership of the National Assembly being one of the positions eligible for the role per the 2023 constitutional changes. Commenting the rumours about her undertaking the role, Kiselova confirmed that she did not exclude the possibility in the case of failed government negotiations.

Shortly after being elected, Kiselova further promised to expedite the process of electing regulators with an expired mandate, as well as pass the 2025 budget.

In an interview on 24 December 2024, Kiselova confirmed that the two main priorities for the parliament in the first months of the New Year would be the passage of legislation concerning the budget and the Supreme Judicial Council. She further opined that a GERB-led government was more likely, following the beginning of negotiations between GERB, BSP, ITN and DB.

Commenting the developments around government formation, including the BSP's decision to enter a coalition government with GERB and ITN, she argued that the decision was necessary in order to guarantee stability. She further made clear that the decision to enter into government with GERB did not mean an endorsement of GERB's governance model or the potential candidacy of Boyko Borisov for Prime Minister.

During a hearing of the minister of finance, Temenuzhka Petkova, on 30 January, PP-DB MP, Venko Sabrutev, threw the rulebook of the National Assembly at Kiselova, after she interrupted his speech. Leading Kiselova to give him a verbal warning.

Kiselova refused a request by the Ukrainian foreign ministry for the Ukrainian flag to be displayed on the National Assembly building during the commemoration of the Russian invasion of Ukraine on February, 24. She further halted the procedure for the emplacement of a new coat of arms on the parliaments meeting place, the Party House, which was set to replace the old coat of arms which contained the hammer and sickle.

On 12 March, Kiselova submitted a declaration for the National Assembly's consideration, which condemned the lack of clarity about the recount ordered by the Constitutional Court in relation to the preceding elections in October. The declaration was condemned by representatives of the PP-DB parliamentary group for being potentially unconstitutional.

On the morning of 21 March, Kiselova dissolved the MECh parliamentary group after they technically fell below the required threshold of 10 MPs following the resignation of newly elected MP, Samuil Slavov. The decision was heavily criticised by MECh leader, Radostin Vasilev, who stated that the current number of MPs within the MECh parliamentary group was only temporary, due to the recent Constitutional Court decision for the re-calculation of the election results, meaning Kiselova's decision went against the spirit of the rule. Vasilev promised to obstruct the work of the National Assembly until the parliamentary group was restored and called for Kiselova's resignation.

In response, she accused Vasilev of "denigrating the dignity" of the National Assembly with his recent statements and ignoring the rule-book. In a briefing on 25 March, Kiselova denied allegations brought forth by Vasilev that she had been pressured into dissolving the MECh parliamentary group, and claimed that she had been in frequent contact with MECh about the status of their parliamentary group. She proposed two potential solutions to the problem: either an amendment to the existing rule-book, or an exceptional act of the National Assembly. The MECh parliamentary group was restored on 26 March following the swearing-in of two new MPs from the MECh list, as well as an exceptional act of the National Assembly.

Commenting the first one hundred days of the Zhelyazkov Government, Kiselova generally praised the work of the government and expressed frustration with attempts by the opposition to obstruct the work of the parliament.

On 22 April, Kiselova appeared at a game of local football club CSKA Sofia wearing the club's jersey, which was showing its sponsor, the gambling company Winbet. Her appearance in the jersey led to calls by DSB leader, Atanas Atanasov, for her resignation as it violated a rulebook provision banning the advertisement of gambling by MPs. Kiselova has denied the existence of a problem with her wearing the jersey, and has called for a broader discussion about the influence of gambling companies within the sports industry.

On 12 May, President Rumen Radev submitted a proposal for a referendum on the adoption of the Euro in 2026 to the National Assembly. Kiselova decided to return the proposed referendum to the presidency, motivating her decision by its potential anti-constitutionality. She expressed support for the countries ascension into the Eurozone. Further, she criticised President Radev for his obstruction of key appointments within the security services. Kiselova further denied Radev's claims that Peevski had influence over the Zhelyazkov government.

On 25 September, the parliamentary group of Revival formally announced they would start collecting signatures to initiate Kiselova's removal. The initiative for Kiselova's removal had previously also been proposed by DSB. PP and MECh both confirmed they would support Revival's initiative. Kiselova stated that she was "not worried" about the procedure, and denied claims of prejudice.

On 14 October, GERB leader, Boyko Borisov, unexpectedly called for Kiselova's removal, stating that it was time for a new chairperson to be elected and criticising her for her frequent participation in public events. Kiselova's replacement with another figure, specifically selected from GERB, was supported by DPS leader, Delyan Peevski. She was defended by BSP chairman, Atanas Zafirov who stated that he had not heard any substantive criticisms of Kiselova's work. Kiselova stated that she was ready to resign if it was in the interests of maintaining a stable majority.

On 21 October, GERB and ITN officially confirmed that they wished for the removal of Kiselova and the election of a new chairperson on a rotational principle. After BSP accepted the proposal, Nataliya Kiselova formally resigned on 29 October. Following the resignation of the Zhelyazkov government on 12 December 2025, as a result of the 2025 Bulgarian protests, Kiselova argued that the decision for her resignation was an event that undermined relations inside the governing coalition.

=== BSP–OL Parliamentary Leader ===
On 11 February, National Assembly chairwoman Raya Nazaryan announced that Kiselova had been elected as the chairwoman of the BSP-United Left parliamentary group, replacing Dragomir Stoynev.
