= 46th National Assembly of Bulgaria =

July 2021 legislature in Bulgaria

46th National Assembly 46-то Народно събрание

History
- Founded: July 21, 2021
- Disbanded: September 15, 2021
- Preceded by: 45th National Assembly
- Succeeded by: 47th National Assembly

Leadership
- Speaker: Iva Miteva (ITN)
- Deputy Speakers: Kristian Vigenin; Atanas Atanasov; Viktoria Vassileva; Tatyana Doncheva; Rositsa Kirova; Mukaddes Nalbant

Structure
- Seats: 240
- Political groups: ITN (65) GERB-SDS (63) BSP (36) DB (34) DPS (29) IBG-NI (12)

Meeting place
- National Assembly Building, Sofia

Website
- parliament.bg

The Forty-Sixth National Assembly (Bulgarian: Четиридесет и шестото народно събрание) was a convocation of the National Assembly of Bulgaria, formed according to the results of the early parliamentary elections in Bulgaria, held on 15 July 2021.

== Details ==
The assembly was dissolved on 15 September 2021 by President Rumen Radev, as he is obliged to do according to the Constitution in the event of three unsuccessful attempts to form a government.
