= Stoyan Taslakov =

Bulgarian politician (born 1987)

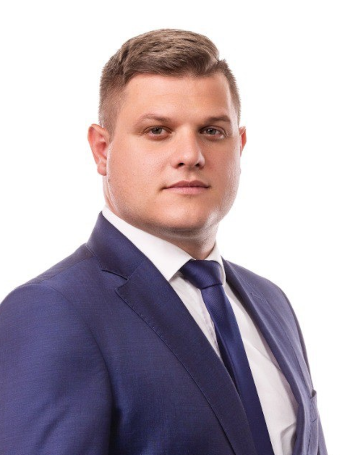
- Taslakov in 2024

Member of the National Assembly
- Incumbent
- Assumed office 3 December 2021
- Constituency: Pazardzhik (2021–2022); Plovdiv Province (2022–2023); Pazardzhik (2023–present)

Personal details
- Born: 25 March 1987 (age 39)
- Party: Revival

Stoyan Nikolov Taslakov (Bulgarian: Стоян Николов Таслаков; born 25 March 1987) is a Bulgarian politician serving as a member of the National Assembly since 2021. He has served as chairman of the committee on diaspora policy since 2025.
