= Nikola Dimitrov (Bulgarian politician) =

Bulgarian politician (born 1990)

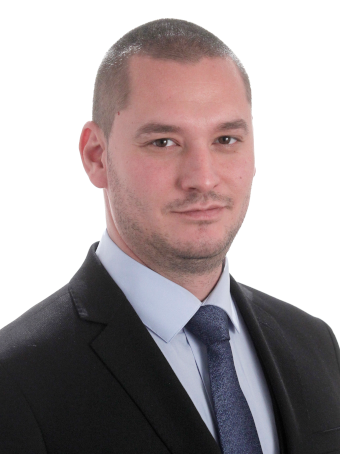
- Dimitrov in 2021

Member of the National Assembly
- Incumbent
- Assumed office 3 December 2021
- Constituency: Yambol

Personal details
- Born: 17 November 1990 (age 35)
- Party: Revival (since 2014)

Nikola Angelov Dimitrov (Bulgarian: Никола Ангелов Димитров; born 17 November 1990) is a Bulgarian politician of Revival. Since 2021, he has been a member of the National Assembly. In 2014, he was a co-founder of Revival.
