= Kostadin Angelov (disambiguation) =

Kostadin Angelov may refer to:

- Kostadin Angelov (born 1973), Bulgarian football manager
- Kostadin Angelov (politician) (born 1977), Bulgarian politician
- Kostadin Angelov (artist) (c. 1835–1905), Bulgarian artist
