= 47th National Assembly of Bulgaria =

December 2021 legislature in Bulgaria

47th National Assembly 47-мо Народно събрание

History
- Founded: December 3, 2021
- Disbanded: August 1, 2022
- Preceded by: 46th National Assembly
- Succeeded by: 48th National Assembly

Leadership
- Speaker: Nikola Minchev (PP)
- Deputy Speakers: Kristian Vigenin; Iva Miteva; Atanas Atanasov; Tsoncho Ganev; Rositsa Kirova; Miroslav Ivanov; Mukaddes Nalbant

Structure
- Seats: 240
- Political groups: Government (134) PP (67) BSP (26) ITN (25) DB (16) Opposition (106) GERB-SDS (59) DPS (34) Revival (13) Government (109) PP (67) BSP (26) DB (16) Confidence and supply (6) Independent (6) Opposition (125) GERB-SDS (59) DPS (34) ITN (19) Revival (13)

Meeting place
- National Assembly Building, Sofia

Website
- www.parliament.bg

The Forty-Seventh National Assembly (Bulgarian: Четиридесет и седмото народно събрание) was a convocation of the National Assembly of Bulgaria, formed according to the results of the early parliamentary elections in Bulgaria, held on 14 November 2021.

== Government formation ==
After coalition negotiations between the parliamentary groups of PP, BSP, ITN and DB, the four parties agreed to a cabinet structure and a common legislative program. Despite some political differences, the four political forces were united behind the idea of ousting the GERB and DPS parties from power, which they deemed as corrupt. The failure of the previous two convocations of the National Assembly to elect a government also made the formation of a new one an urgency.

== Votes of no-confidence ==
On 8 June 2022 ITN leader Slavi Trifonov announced that he was putting an end to the coalition by pulling his ministers from the cabinet. He explained that decision by calling the government's policy in regards to North Macedonia ‘weak’ and blaming Finance Minister Assen Vassilev for the economic status of Bulgaria.

Following that announcement, 6 members of the National Assembly from ITN declared their independence. Nikola Minchev was among the first victims of the government becoming a minority one by being removed as Speaker of the National Assembly on June 6, 2022. The Petkov Government was removed from office after a successful vote of no-confidence against itself.
