= Galin Durev =

Bulgarian politician (born 1987)

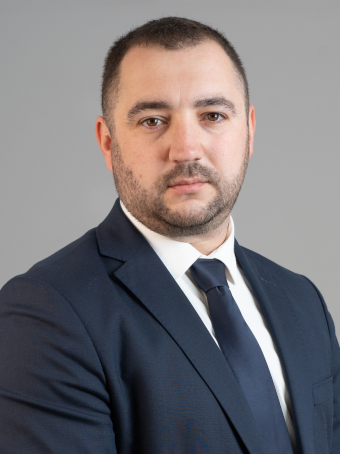
- Durev in 2026

Member of the National Assembly
- Incumbent
- Assumed office 17 January 2025
- Constituency: Plovdiv Province

Personal details
- Born: 21 May 1987 (age 38)
- Party: Progressive Bulgaria (since 2026); BSP (before 2026)

Galin Nedelchev Durev (Bulgarian: Галин Неделчев Дурев; born 21 May 1987) is a Bulgarian politician serving as a member of the National Assembly since 2025. He has served as deputy group leader of Progressive Bulgaria since 2026.
