= Mihaela Dotsova =

Bulgarian politician (born 1984)

- Михаела Доцова
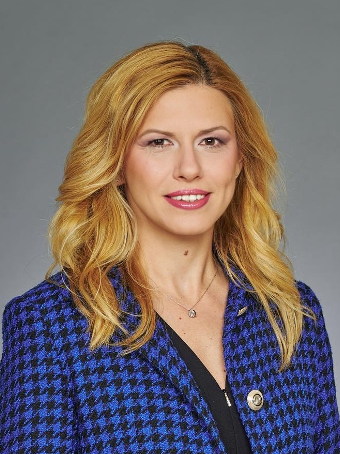
- Dotsova in 2026

Chairwoman of the National Assembly
- Incumbent
- Assumed office 30 April 2026
- Preceded by: Raya Nazaryan

Personal details
- Born: 17 March 1984 (age 42) Berkovitsa, PR Bulgaria
- Party: Progressive Bulgaria (since 2026)
- Education: Sofia University

Mihaela Milcheva Dotsova (Bulgarian: Михаела Милчева Доцова; born 17 March 1984) is a Bulgarian jurist and politician serving as a member of the 52nd National Assembly since 2026. She has served as chairwoman of the Assembly since 30 April 2026, representing the Progressive Bulgaria party.

== Early life and education ==
Mihaela Dotsova was born on 17 March 1984 in the town of Berkovitsa, PR Bulgaria. Her father, Milcho Dotsov, served as the mayor of Berkovitsa for two non-consecutive periods: from 2004 to 2011 and from 2015 to 2019. She completed her primary education at the Second Primary School "Hristo Smirnenski" in her hometown.

Dotsova later graduated in law from Sofia University "St. Kliment Ohridski". She holds a PhD in administrative law and administrative process.

== Career in public administration ==
Before entering high-level politics, Dotsova worked as a legal expert in the administration of the National Assembly and the regional administration of Sofia Province.

From 2017 to 2026, her professional career was tied to the Ministry of Environment and Water. She spent over seven years as the director of the "Legal" directorate within the ministry. During her tenure at the institution, she also held the positions of Chief Secretary and Head of the Cabinet. Notably, during the mandate of the Zhelyazkov cabinet, she served as the head of the political cabinet for the Minister of Environment and Water, Manol Genov.

== Political career ==
In 2026, Dotsova was elected as a Member of Parliament in the 52nd National Assembly as a representative of the Progressive Bulgaria party.

On 30 April 2026, she was nominated for the position of Chairwoman of the National Assembly by her colleague Petar Vitanov. She won the election with a decisive majority, receiving 188 votes in favor, zero against, and 49 abstentions (primarily from the PP-DB coalition and Vazrazhdane). Her only competitor for the post, Petar Petrov from the Vazrazhdane party, received 12 votes in favor.
