= Political Movement "Social Democrats" =

Bulgarian political party

Political Movement "Social Democrats" Политическо движение „Социалдемократи“
- Abbreviation: PDS
- Leader: Elena Noneva
- Founded: 3 June 2000
- Registered: 19 July 2000
- Headquarters: Vasil Levski Boulevard 25, Sofia
- Ideology: Social democracy
- Political position: Centre-left
- National affiliation: BSP for Bulgaria (2001–2005); We Continue the Change (2021–2022); Levitsata! (2024); BSP – United Left (2024); Progressive Bulgaria (2026–)
- Colours: Red
- National Assembly: 0 / 240
- European Parliament: 0 / 17

Website
- pdsocialdemocrati.org

The Political Movement "Social Democrats" (Bulgarian: Политическо движение „Социалдемократи“, romanized: Politicesko Dviženie "Socialdemokrati", PDS) is a centre-left and social-democratic political party in Bulgaria.

== History ==
After being founded in 2000, PDS was part of the Coalition for Bulgaria, an alliance led by the Bulgarian Socialist Party (BSP) over the following years. In the 2001 Bulgarian parliamentary election, the Coalition for Bulgaria won 17.1% of the popular vote and 48 out of 240 seats. At the 2005 Bulgarian parliamentary election, the coalition won 34.2% of the popular vote and 82 out of 240 seats – the PDS had one MP elected, Nikolay Kamov.

At the beginning of 2008, the PDS had over 20,000 members.

The party joined the electoral coalition We Continue the Change (PP) to compete in the 2021 Bulgarian general election; while the coalition as a whole gained seats in the National Assembly, the PDS did not. In the 2022 Bulgarian parliamentary election, the PDS was no longer part of the PP coalition. In December 2023, it was included without their knowledge in the BSP – United Left coalition led by the BSP. Elena Noneva, leader of the PDS, emphasized their ideological differences with the BSP and disavowed any affiliation.

Ahead of the 2026 Bulgarian election, PDS acted as a "mandate carrier" party for Rumen Radev's new electoral coalition, Progressive Bulgaria (PB). The coalition went on to win the election with 44.6% of the vote, with PDS winning 2 of the 131 seats won by the coalition. As PB was not a registered party following the election, PDS and the other minor parties in the electoral coalition came to an agreement to share the state subsidy given out to political parties.
