= Petar Petrov (politician) =

Bulgarian politician (born 1983)

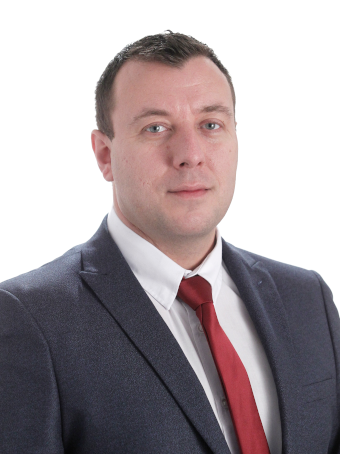

Member of the National Assembly
- Incumbent
- Assumed office 3 December 2021
- Constituency: 24th MMC (2021–2022); Montana (2022–present)

Personal details
- Born: 14 March 1983 (age 43)
- Party: Revival (since 2014)

Petar Nikolaev Petrov (Bulgarian: Петър Николаев Петров; born 14 March 1983) is a Bulgarian lawyer, politician and a deputy chairman of the far-right Revival party, member of the 47th, 48th, 49th, 50th, and 51st National Assembly. Member of the Parliamentary Committees on Constitutional and Legal Affairs and on Internal Security and Public Order.

== Biography ==
Petar Petrov was born on 14 March 1983. In 2006, he graduated in Law from Sofia University “St. Kliment Ohridski”. After that, he practiced in the field of civil litigation – with experience in tort cases, corporate law and real estate transactions. In his activities over the years, he has also implemented a number of investment projects of foreign investors in the field of construction and purchase of real estate in Bulgaria. He participates as a managing partner in the law firm “Yosifova, Ivanov & Petrov”, and in non-profit associations for public benefit activities, such as “Great Bulgaria”.

== Political career ==
In 2014, he became one of the founders of the Revival party, becoming its deputy chairman.

In the parliamentary elections in Bulgaria in November 2021, as a candidate for a member of the National Assembly, he was the leader of the list of the Revival party in 24th MMC – Sofia. He was elected as a Member of the National Assembly from the same constituency. In the 47th, 48th, 49th, 50th, and 51st National Assembly, he was deputy chairman of the parliamentary group. In all aforementioned legislatures, he is a member of the Parliamentary Committees on Constitutional and Legal Affairs and on Internal Security and Public Order.
