= Manol Genov =

Bulgarian politician (born 1960)

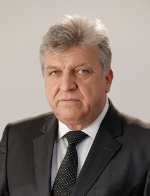
- Genov in 2021

Minister of Environment and Water
- Incumbent
- Assumed office 16 January 2025
- Prime Minister: Rosen Zhelyazkov
- Preceded by: Petar Dimitrov

Member of the National Assembly
- Incumbent
- Assumed office 11 November 2024
- Constituency: Plovdiv Province
- In office 27 October 2014 – 18 June 2024
- Constituency: Plovdiv Province

Personal details
- Born: 14 June 1960 (age 65)
- Party: Bulgarian Socialist Party

Manol Trifonov Genov (Bulgarian: Манол Трифонов Генов; born 14 June 1960) is a Bulgarian politician. He has been a member of the National Assembly since 2024, having previously served from 2014 to 2024. He has served as deputy parliamentary leader of BSP – United Left since 2024.
