= Pavela Mitova =

Bulgarian politician (born 1991)

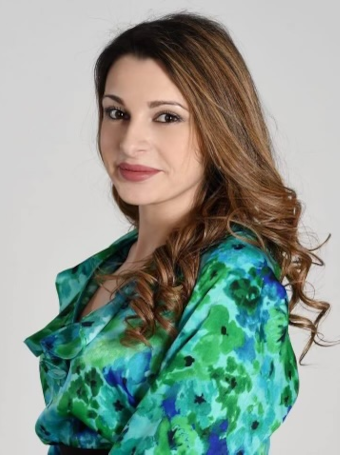
- Mitova in 2024

Member of the National Assembly
- Incumbent
- Assumed office 12 April 2023
- Constituency: 23rd MMC (2023–2024); Blagoevgrad (2024–present)
- In office 21 July 2021 – 15 September 2021
- Constituency: Stara Zagora

Personal details
- Born: 28 January 1991 (age 35)
- Party: There is Such a People

Pavela Vasileva Mitova (Bulgarian: Павела Василева Митова; born 28 January 1991) is a Bulgarian politician. She has been a member of the National Assembly since 2023, having previously served from July to September 2021. Since 2025, she has chaired the energy committee.
