= George's Day Movement =

George's Day Movement Движение Гергьовден
- Honorary President: Lyuben Dilov Jr.
- Chairman: Dragomir Stefanov
- Founder: Lyuben Dilov Jr.
- Founded: 10 December 1996
- Registered: February 1997
- Headquarters: Sofia, Bulgaria
- Ideology: National conservatism Bulgarian nationalism Right-wing populism
- Political position: Centre-right to right-wing
- National affiliation: GERB-SDS
- Colors: Yellow
- National Assembly: 0 / 240
- European Parliament: 0 / 17

Website
- www.gergiovden.eu

The George's Day Movement (Bulgarian: Движение Гергьовден, romanized: Dvizhenie Gergyovden) is a nationalist political party in Bulgaria.

The party was founded in December 1996 by members of the political satire television programme Canaletto. Members of the show, which succeeded Ku-Ku in the mid-1990s, participated in the 1997 Bulgarian protests, and had previously tried to create a party named the Ku-Ku People’s Movement in 1994, but the registration was denied by the Supreme Court of Cassation of Bulgaria, with tacit support from the two major political parties at the time, the Union of Democratic Forces and the Bulgarian Socialist Party. The founder of the party, Lyuben Dilov Jr. estimated that had it run in the 1997 parliamentary election, the party could have earned roughly 10% of the vote and over 30 seats in the parliament. Ultimately, it opted to instead focus on the local elections held in 1999, until which time it de facto operated as a union of clubs alongside the Civil Society Against Corruption Association. Future There Is Such a People founder Slavi Trifonov was a supporter of the party during this time and a member of the television program Ku-Ku and its successor.

It joined the United Democratic Forces before the 2005 elections. The party participated in an electoral coalition with GERB and the Union of Democratic Forces since elections in 2021.
