= Nikoleta Kuzmanova =

Bulgarian politician (born 1971)

- Николета Кузманова
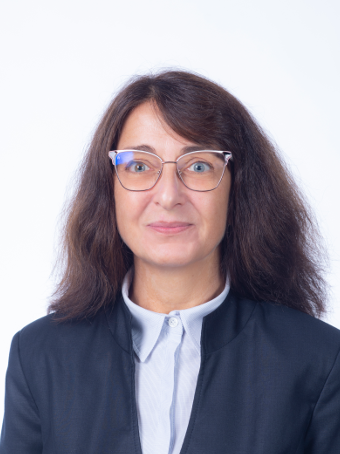

Member of the National Assembly
- Incumbent
- Assumed office 11 November 2024
- Constituency: Gabrovo

Personal details
- Born: 7 October 1971 (age 54)
- Party: There is Such a People

Nikoleta Kirilova Kuzmanova (Bulgarian: Николета Кирилова Кузманова; born 7 October 1971) is a Bulgarian politician of There is Such a People serving as a member of the National Assembly since 2024. She is a professor of criminal law at Sofia University.
