= Andrey Chorbanov =

Bulgarian politician (born 1967)

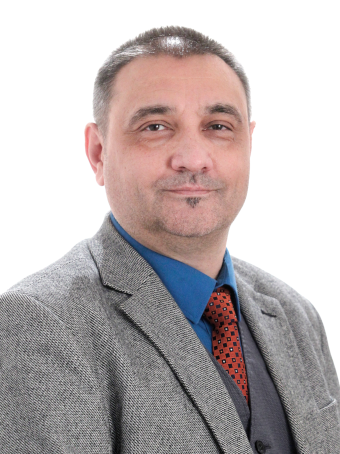

Member of the National Assembly
- Incumbent
- Assumed office 19 April 2023
- Constituency: Veliko Tarnovo
- In office 15 April 2021 – 1 August 2022
- Constituency: 23rd MMC; 24th MMC; Sofia Province

Personal details
- Born: 1 June 1967 (age 58)
- Party: There is Such a People

Andrey Ivanov Chorbanov (Bulgarian: Андрей Иванов Чорбанов; born 1 June 1967) is a Bulgarian immunologist and politician of There is Such a People. He has been a member of the National Assembly since 2023, having previously served from 2021 to 2022. Since 2023, he has served as deputy speaker of the assembly. In the 2011 presidential election, he was a candidate for president of Bulgaria.
