= Chairperson of the National Assembly of Bulgaria =

Presiding officer of the National Assembly of Bulgaria

Chairperson of the National Assembly of the Republic of Bulgaria
- Председател на Народното събрание на Република България; Predsedatel na Narodnoto sabranie na Republika Balgariya
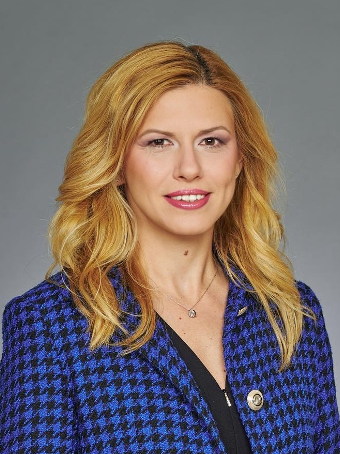
- Incumbent; Mihaela Dotsova since 30 April 2026
- National Assembly of Bulgaria
- Style: Mister/Madam President
- Residence: No official residence
- Seat: Old Parliament House, Sofia
- Appointer: National Assembly
- Term length: Four years
- Inaugural holder: Anthim I
- Formation: 14 February 1879; 147 years ago
- Salary: €6,238 monthly

The chairperson of the National Assembly of the Republic of Bulgaria (Bulgarian: Председател на Народното събрание на Република България, romanized: Predsedatel na Narodnoto sabranie na Republika Balgariya) is the presiding officer of the National Assembly of Bulgaria. The assembly selects the chairperson during its opening session. The term of the chairperson coincides with the term of the assembly. The salary of the chairperson is лв. 10,973 per month.

== List of chairpersons (1879–present) ==
This is a list of all chairpersons of the National Assembly of Bulgaria from its establishment in 1879 until today.

National Assembly	Portrait	Chairperson	Term
Constituent National Assembly		Anthim I	14 February 1879 – 16 April 1879
1st Grand National Assembly		Anthim I	17 April 1879 – 26 June 1879
1st Ordinary National Assembly		Petko Karavelov	21 October 1879 – 24 November 1879
2nd Ordinary National Assembly		Petko Karavelov	23 March 1880 – 26 March 1880
2nd Ordinary National Assembly		Petko Slaveykov	26 March 1880 – 28 November 1880
2nd Ordinary National Assembly		Nikola Suknarov	29 November 1880 – 18 December 1880
2nd Grand National Assembly		Todor Ikonomov	1 July 1881
3rd Ordinary National Assembly		Simeon Varnensko-Preslavski	11 December 1882 – 8 September 1883
3rd Ordinary National Assembly		Dimitar Grekov	9 September 1883 – 25 December 1883
4th Ordinary National Assembly		Petko Karavelov	27 June 1884 – 30 June 1884
4th Ordinary National Assembly		Stefan Stambolov	30 June 1884 – 26 August 1886
4th Ordinary National Assembly		Georgi Zhivkov	1 September 1886 – 6 September 1886
3rd Grand National Assembly		Georgi Zhivkov	19 October 1886 – 1 November 1886
3rd Grand National Assembly		Dimitar Tonchev	22 June 1887 – 3 August 1887
5th Ordinary National Assembly		Dimitar Tonchev	15 October 1887 – 12 December 1888
5th Ordinary National Assembly		Zahari Stoyanov	13 December 1888 – 6 September 1889
5th Ordinary National Assembly		Panayot Slavkov	22 October 1889 – 15 October 1890
6th Ordinary National Assembly		Panayot Slavkov	15 October 1890 – 12 December 1892
6th Ordinary National Assembly		Dimitar Petkov	14 December 1892 – 3 May 1893
4th Grand National Assembly		Dimitar Petkov	3 May 1893 – 17 May 1893
7th Ordinary National Assembly		Dimitar Petkov	15 October 1893 – 19 November 1893
7th Ordinary National Assembly		Georgi Zhivkov	20 November 1893 – 1 August 1894
8th Ordinary National Assembly		Teodor Teodorov	15 October 1894 – 10 October 1896
9th Ordinary National Assembly		Georgi Yankulov	1 December 1896 – 19 December 1898
10th Ordinary National Assembly		Dimitar Vachov	16 May 1899 – 1 October 1899
10th Ordinary National Assembly		Zhecho Bakalov	18 October 1899 – 29 September 1900
11th Ordinary National Assembly		Ivan Evstratiev Geshov	22 February 1901 – 25 October 1901
11th Ordinary National Assembly		Marko Balabanov	25 October 1901 – 23 December 1901
12th Ordinary National Assembly		Dragan Tsankov	22 April 1902 – 21 August 1903
13th Ordinary National Assembly		Petar Staykov	2 November 1903 – 30 January 1904
13th Ordinary National Assembly		Todor Gatev	20 October 1904 – 18 December 1905
13th Ordinary National Assembly		Petar Gudev	17 October 1905 – 2 March 1907
13th Ordinary National Assembly		Dobri Petkov	5 March 1907 – 18 April 1908
14th Ordinary National Assembly		Hristo Slaveykov	15 June 1908 – 15 September 1910
14th Ordinary National Assembly		Petar Orahovats	15 October 1910 – 15 February 1911
5th Grand National Assembly		Stoyan Danev	9 June 1911 – 9 July 1911
15th Ordinary National Assembly		Stoyan Danev	15 October 1911 – 1 June 1913
15th Ordinary National Assembly		Ivan Evstratiev Geshov	26 June 1913 – 23 July 1913
16th Ordinary National Assembly		Dimitar Vachov	19 December 1913 – 31 December 1913
17th Ordinary National Assembly		Dimitar Vachov	20 March 1914 – 15 April 1919
18th Ordinary National Assembly		Naycho Tsanov	10 October 1919
18th Ordinary National Assembly		Nedyalko Atanasov	2 October 1919 – 20 February 1920
19th Ordinary National Assembly		Aleksandar Botev	15 April 1920 – 24 June 1921
19th Ordinary National Assembly		Nedyalko Atanasov	4 November 1921 – 11 March 1923
20th Ordinary National Assembly		Aleksandar Botev	21 May 1923 – 11 June 1923
21st Ordinary National Assembly		Todor Kulev	9 December 1923 – 4 January 1926
21st Ordinary National Assembly		Aleksandar Tsankov	5 January 1926 – 15 April 1927
22nd Ordinary National Assembly		Aleksandar Tsankov	19 June 1927 – 15 May 1930
22nd Ordinary National Assembly		Nikola Naydenov	21 May 1930 – 15 April 1931
23rd Ordinary National Assembly		Stefan Stefanov	20 August 1931 – 12 October 1931
23rd Ordinary National Assembly		Aleksandar Malinov	15 October 1931 – 18 May 1934
24th Ordinary National Assembly		Stoycho Moshanov	22 May 1938 – 24 October 1939
25th Ordinary National Assembly		Nikola Logofetov	24 February 1940 – 16 May 1941
25th Ordinary National Assembly		Hristo Kalfov	16 May 1941 – 23 August 1944
26th Ordinary National Assembly		Vasil Kolarov	15 December 1945 – 6 November 1946
6th Grand National Assembly		Vasil Kolarov	7 November 1946 – 21 October 1949
1st (27th) National Assembly		Ferdinand Kozovski	1 February 1950 – 2 December 1953
2nd (28th) National Assembly		Ferdinand Kozovski	14 January 1954 – 11 December 1957
3rd (29th) National Assembly		Ferdinand Kozovski	13 January 1958 – 4 November 1961
4th (30th) National Assembly		Ferdinand Kozovski	15 March 1962 – 12 September 1965
4th (30th) National Assembly		Sava Ganovski	6 December 1965 – 8 December 1965
5th (31st) National Assembly		Sava Ganovski	11 March 1966 – 6 July 1971
6th (32nd) National Assembly		Georgi Traykov	7 July 1971 – 27 April 1972
6th (32nd) National Assembly		Vladimir Bonev	27 April 1972 – 9 March 1976
7th (33rd) National Assembly		Vladimir Bonev	15 June 1976 – 7 April 1981
8th (34th) National Assembly		Stanko Todorov	16 June 1981 – 21 March 1986
9th (35th) National Assembly		Stanko Todorov	17 June 1986 – 3 April 1990
7th Grand National Assembly		Nikolai Todorov	17 July 1990 – 2 October 1991
36th National Assembly		Stefan Savov	4 November 1991 – 24 September 1992
36th National Assembly		Aleksandar Yordanov	5 November 1992 – 17 October 1994
37th National Assembly		Blagovest Sendov	12 January 1995 – 13 February 1997
38th National Assembly		Yordan Sokolov	7 May 1997 – 19 April 2001
39th National Assembly		Ognyan Gerdzhikov	5 July 2001 – 4 February 2005
39th National Assembly		Borislav Velikov	23 February 2005 – 17 June 2005
40th National Assembly		Georgi Pirinski	11 July 2005 – 25 June 2009
41st National Assembly		Tsetska Tsacheva	14 July 2009 – 13 March 2013
42nd National Assembly		Mihail Mikov	21 May 2013 – 6 August 2014
43rd National Assembly		Tsetska Tsacheva	27 October 2014 – 26 January 2017
44th National Assembly		Dimitar Glavchev	19 April 2017 – 17 November 2017
44th National Assembly		Tsveta Karayancheva	17 November 2017 – 25 March 2021
45th National Assembly		Iva Miteva	15 April 2021 – 11 May 2021
46th National Assembly		Iva Miteva	21 July 2021 – 16 September 2021
47th National Assembly		Nikola Minchev	2 December 2021 – 16 June 2022
47th National Assembly		Miroslav Ivanov (acting)	16 June 2022 – 1 August 2022
48th National Assembly		Vezhdi Rashidov	21 October 2022 – 3 February 2023
49th National Assembly		Rosen Zhelyazkov	19 April 2023 – 25 April 2024
49th National Assembly		Rositsa Kirova (acting)	25 April 2024 – 19 June 2024
50th National Assembly		Raya Nazaryan	20 June 2024 – 11 November 2024
51st National Assembly		Nataliya Kiselova	6 December 2024 – 29 October 2025
51st National Assembly		Raya Nazaryan	29 October 2025 – 30 April 2026
52nd National Assembly		Mihaela Dotsova	30 April 2026 – present

== List of living former chairpersons of the National Assembly ==
Name	Term of office	Date of birth
Aleksandar Yordanov	1992–1994	13 February 1952 (age 74)
Ognyan Gerdzhikov	2001–2005	19 March 1946 (age 80)
Borislav Velikov	2005	29 October 1946 (age 80)
Georgi Pirinski	2005–2009	10 September 1948 (age 78)
Mihail Mikov	2013–2014	16 June 1960 (age 66)
Tsetska Tsacheva	2009–2013; 2014–2017	24 May 1958 (age 68)
Dimitar Glavchev	2017	15 August 1963 (age 63)
Tsveta Karayancheva	2017–2021	25 February 1968 (age 58)
Iva Miteva	2021	25 October 1972 (age 54)
Nikola Minchev	2021–2022	13 September 1987 (age 39)
Rosen Zhelyazkov	2023–2024	5 April 1968 (age 58)
Nataliya Kiselova	2024	19 June 1977 (age 49)
Raya Nazaryan	2024; 2025–2026	16 September 1985 (age 41)

== See also ==
- History of Bulgaria
- Politics of Bulgaria

== Notes ==
1. Naycho Tsanov retired for political reasons on 10 October 1919, his duties being done by vice-chairman Nedyalko Atanasov.
2. Nikolay Georgiev was acting Chairman 20 April 1964 – 23 April 1964.
3. After the 7th Grand National Assembly dissolved on 12 July 1991, it continued to function as an Ordinary National Assembly until 2 October the same year.
4. Snezhana Bothusharova was acting Chairman 24 September 1992 – 5 November 1992
5. Kamelia Kasabova was acting Chairman 4 February 2005 – 23 February 2005
