= Stoyu Stoev =

Bulgarian politician (born 1992)

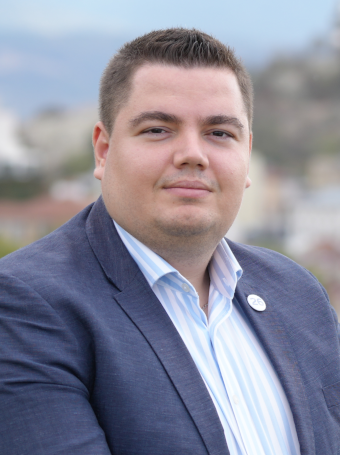
- Stoev in 2024

Member of the National Assembly
- Incumbent
- Assumed office 3 December 2021
- Constituency: Plovdiv Province (2021–2024); Plovdiv City (2024–present)

Personal details
- Born: 11 November 1992 (age 33)
- Party: We Continue the Change
- Other political affiliations: We Continue the Change – Democratic Bulgaria

Stoyu Teodorov Stoev (Bulgarian: Стою Теодоров Стоев; born 11 November 1992) is a Bulgarian politician of We Continue the Change serving as a member of the National Assembly since 2021. He is a deputy group leader of We Continue the Change – Democratic Bulgaria.
