= GERB–SDS =

GERB–SDS ГЕРБ – СДС
- Abbreviation: GERB–SDS
- Leader: Boyko Borisov
- Founders: Boyko Borisov; Rumen Hristov
- Founded: 28 March 2019
- Ideology: Conservatism; Populism; Pro-Europeanism
- Political position: Centre-right to right-wing
- European affiliation: European People's Party
- European Parliament group: European People's Party Group
- International affiliation: Centrist Democrat International; International Democrat Union
- Coalition members: GERB; Union of Democratic Forces; George's Day Movement
- Colours: Blue
- National Assembly: 39 / 240
- European Parliament: 5 / 17
- Municipalities: 108 / 265

The GERB–SDS (Bulgarian: ГЕРБ – СДС) is a Bulgarian two-party political coalition between GERB and the Union of Democratic Forces, headed by Boyko Borisov.

== History ==
A coalition between the two parties was formed ahead of the 2019 European Parliament election in Bulgaria. On 28 March 2019, an agreement between the two parties was officially signed. In the election, the coalition won first place and received 6 EP seats: five went to GERB, one to SDS.

Party cooperation continued ahead of the April 2021 parliamentary election. The coalition has also signed the political partnership agreements with George's Day Movement, United Agrarians, the Movement for the Unity of the People and the Union of Repressed by Communism "Pamet" The coalition lists were registered in the electoral districts of the country on 1 March 2021. In the election, the coalition won 75 seats out of 240.

The George's Day Movement entered into a coalition ahead of the snap July 2021 parliamentary election. The slogan of the coalition was "Order in the midst of chaos." As a result of the election, the coalition received 63 seats in parliament, losing to the There Is Such a People party, which received 65 seats.

The coalition also participated in the 2021 general presidential and parliamentary election. Coalition candidate Anastas Gerdzhikov finished second in the second round of the presidential election.

GERB–SDS became the largest party coalition in the 2022 parliamentary election and its member Vezhdi Rashidov became the Chairperson of the National Assembly.

The coalition also finished as the largest group in the 2023 parliamentary election. A member of the group, Rosen Zhelyazkov, became Chairman of the National Assembly after a deal with the second largest group- PPDB.

== Parliamentary leaders ==
No.	Name	Portrait	National Assembly
1	Desislava Atanasova (1978–)		45th
1	Desislava Atanasova (1978–)		46th
1	Desislava Atanasova (1978–)		47th
1	Desislava Atanasova (1978–)		48th
1	Desislava Atanasova (1978–)		49th
2	Boyko Borisov (1959–)		49th
2	Boyko Borisov (1959–)		50th
2	Boyko Borisov (1959–)		51st

== Election results ==
=== National Assembly ===
Election	Votes	%	Seats	+/–	Status
Apr 2021	837,707	25.80 (#1)	73 / 240	▼22	Snap election
Jul 2021	642,165	23.21 (#2)	63 / 240	▼13	Snap election
Nov 2021	596,456	22.44 (#2)	59 / 240	▼3	Opposition
2022	634,627	24.48 (#1)	67 / 240	▲8	Snap election
2023	669,924	25.39 (#1)	69 / 240	▲2	Coalition
Jun 2024	530,658	23.99 (#1)	68 / 240	▼1	Snap election
Oct 2024	642,521	25.52 (#1)	66 / 240	▼2	Coalition
2026	433,755	13.18 (#2)	39 / 240	▼27	Opposition

=== European Parliament ===
Election	List leader	Votes	%	Seats	+/–	EP Group
2019	Mariya Gabriel	607,194	30.13 (#1)	6 / 17	0	EPP
2024	Rosen Zhelyazkov	474,059	23.55 (#1)	5 / 17	▼1	EPP
