= Hristo Gadzhev =

Bulgarian politician (born 1983)

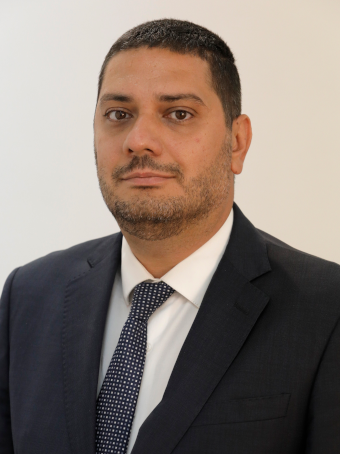
- Gadzhev in 2021

Member of the National Assembly
- Incumbent
- Assumed office 14 November 2014
- Constituency: 25th MMC (2014–2024); 24th MMC (2024–present)

Personal details
- Born: 28 May 1983 (age 42)
- Party: GERB

Hristo Georgiev Gadzhev (Bulgarian: Христо Георгиев Гаджев; born 28 May 1983) is a Bulgarian politician of GERB serving as a member of the National Assembly since 2014. In 2024, he was nominated for minister of defence by prime ministerial candidate Mariya Gabriel.
