= Bogdan Bogdanov (politician) =

Bulgarian politician (born 1987)

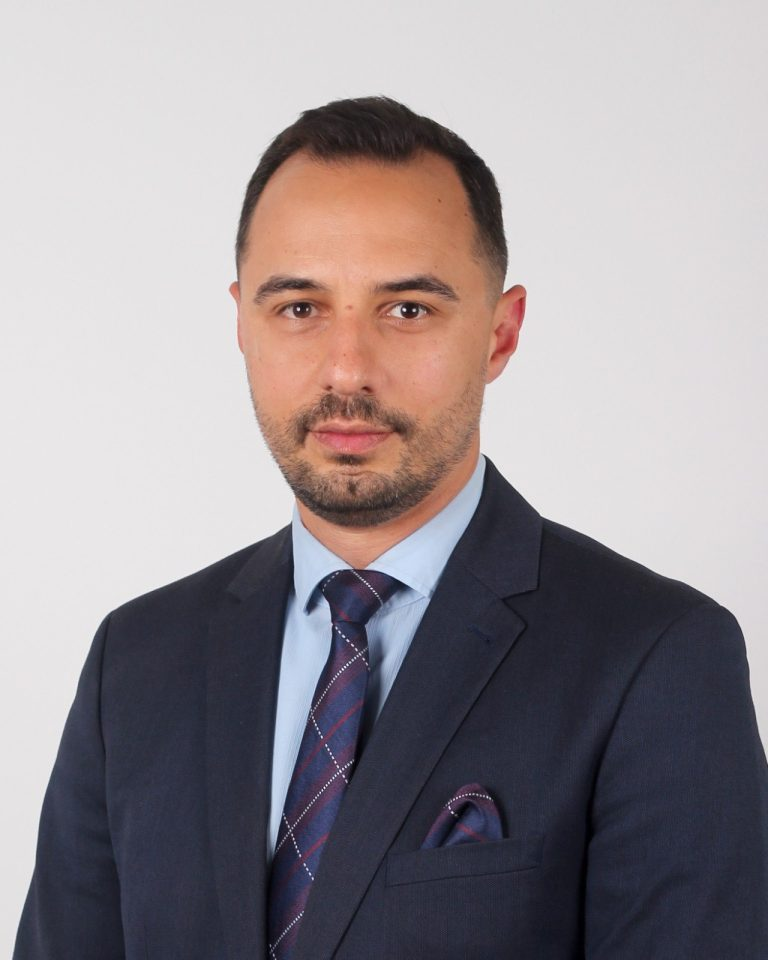
- Bogdanov in 2023

Member of the National Assembly
- Incumbent
- Assumed office 19 June 2024
- Constituency: Pleven

Minister of Economy and Industry
- In office 6 June 2023 – 9 April 2024
- Prime Minister: Nikolai Denkov
- Preceded by: Nikola Stoyanov
- Succeeded by: Petko Nikolov

Personal details
- Born: 19 June 1987 (age 38)
- Party: PP–DB

Bogdan Valeriev Bogdanov (Bulgarian: Богдан Валериев Богданов; born 19 June 1987) is a Bulgarian politician. Since 2024, he has been a member of the National Assembly. From 2023 to 2024, he served as minister of economy and industry. From 2022 to 2023, he was the executive director of the Bulgarian Investment Agency.
