= Halil Letifov =

Bulgarian politician (born 1979)

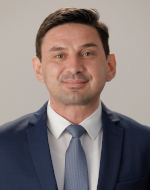
- Letifov in 2021

Member of the National Assembly
- Incumbent
- Assumed office 19 April 2017
- Constituency: Stara Zagora (2017–2021); Blagoevgrad (2021); Stara Zagora (2021–2024); Smolyan (2024–present)
- In office 21 May 2013 – 5 August 2014
- Constituency: Stara Zagora

Personal details
- Born: 16 April 1979 (age 47)
- Party: DPS – A New Beginning (since 2024); Movement for Rights and Freedoms

Halil Redzhepov Letifov (Bulgarian: Халил Реджепов Летифов; born 16 April 1979) is a Bulgarian politician. He has been a member of the National Assembly since 2017, having previously served from 2013 to 2014. He is a deputy group leader of DPS – A New Beginning.
