= Ivelin Mihaylov =

Bulgarian politician (born 1977)

- Ивелин Михайлов
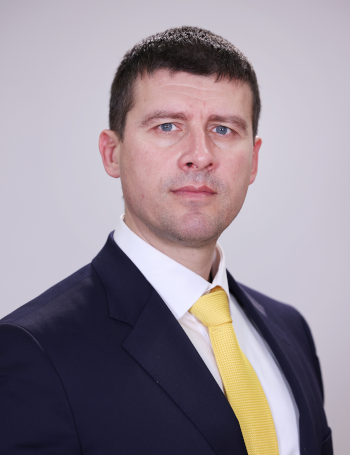
- Official portrait, 2025

Member of the National Assembly
- Incumbent
- Assumed office 14 March 2025
- Constituency: 25th MMC

Personal details
- Born: 30 August 1977 Gorna Oryahovitsa, People's Republic of Bulgaria
- Party: Velichie

Ivelin Lyudmilov Mihaylov (Bulgarian: Ивелин Людмилов Михайлов; born 30 August 1977) is a Bulgarian politician serving as a member of the National Assembly since 2025. In 2023, he founded Velichie.
