= Kostadin Angelov (politician) =

Bulgarian politician (born 1977)

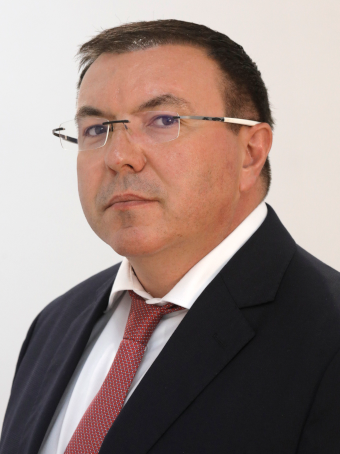
- Angelov in 2021

Member of the National Assembly
- Incumbent
- Assumed office 21 July 2021
- Constituency: Veliko Tarnovo

Minister of Health
- In office 24 July 2020 – 12 May 2021
- Prime Minister: Boyko Borisov
- Preceded by: Kiril Ananiev
- Succeeded by: Stoycho Katsarov

Personal details
- Born: 7 June 1977 (age 49)
- Party: GERB

Kostadin Georgiev Angelov (Bulgarian: Костадин Георгиев Ангелов; born 7 June 1977) is a Bulgarian politician serving as a member of the National Assembly since 2021. From 2020 to 2021, he served as minister of health.
