= Raya Nazaryan =

Bulgarian politician and lawyer (born 1985)

- Рая Назарян
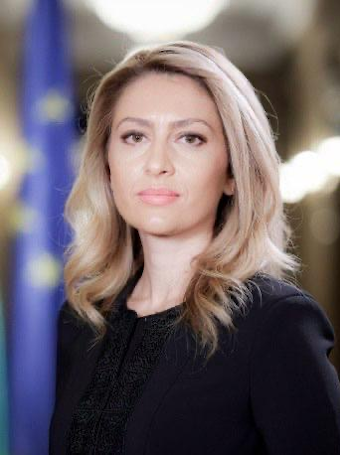
- Official portrait, 2025

Deputy Speaker of the National Assembly
- Incumbent
- Assumed office 30 April 2026
- Speaker: Mihaela Dotsova

Speaker of the National Assembly
- In office 29 October 2025 – 30 April 2026
- Preceded by: Nataliya Kiselova
- Succeeded by: Mihaela Dotsova
- In office 20 June 2024 – 10 November 2024
- Preceded by: Rosen Zhelyazkov
- Succeeded by: Nataliya Kiselova

Member of the National Assembly
- Incumbent
- Assumed office 19 October 2022
- Constituency: 24th MMC - Sofia (2022-2024); 23rd MMC - Sofia (2024-present)

Personal details
- Born: Raya Nazar Nazaryan; 16 September 1985 (age 40) Varna, PR Bulgaria
- Party: GERB
- Spouse: Emil Arabadzhiev (divorced)
- Children: 1
- Education: University of National and World Economy
- Occupation: Politician; lawyer

Raya Nazar Nazaryan (Bulgarian: Рая Назар Назарян; born 16 September 1985) is a Bulgarian lawyer and politician serving as Deputy Speaker of the National Assembly since 30 April 2026. A member of the GERB party, she has served as a Member of the National Assembly since 2022.

Nazaryan has twice served as Speaker of the National Assembly. She first held the office from June to November 2024, and later returned to the role as a rotating speaker from 29 October 2025 to 30 April 2026.

== Early life and education ==
Nazaryan was born on 16 September 1985 in Varna to an Armenian family. She completed her secondary education at the "Konstantin Preslavski" High School of Humanities in her hometown. She then pursued higher education in the capital, graduating with a degree in law from the University of National and World Economy in Sofia.

== Political career ==
Nazaryan entered politics as a member of the GERB party. She was first elected as a Member of Parliament in the 48th National Assembly in October 2022, representing the 24th Multi-member Constituency in Sofia. She subsequently retained her seat in the 49th, 50th, 51st, and 52nd National Assemblies, later representing the 23rd MMC in Sofia.

During the 49th National Assembly, she served as Chairperson of the Committee on Prevention and Counteraction of Corruption, showcasing her legal expertise in legislative matters. She was also a deputy chair of the GERB-SDS parliamentary group.

On 20 June 2024, she was elected as the Speaker of the 50th National Assembly. She held the position until 10 November 2024. In the 51st National Assembly, she initially served as Vice-President. On 29 October 2025, after the resignation of Nataliya Kiselova, Nazaryan was elected once again as the Speaker of the National Assembly as part of a rotating agreement. She received the support of 129 MPs during the vote, while 77 opposed and 14 abstained.

Her tenure as Speaker concluded on 30 April 2026, when she was succeeded by Mihaela Dotsova. Nazaryan then assumed the role of Deputy Speaker of the National Assembly.

== Personal life ==
Nazaryan is divorced from businessman Emil Arabadzhiev, and she has one child.
