= Revival (Bulgaria) =

Revival Възраждане
- Leader: Kostadin Kostadinov
- Founded: 2 August 2014
- Split from: VMRO
- Headquarters: Hristo Botev blvd. 111, Sofia
- Ideology: Ultranationalism; National conservatism; Right-wing populism; Hard Euroscepticism; Russophilia; Homophobia
- Political position: Far-right
- European affiliation: ESN Party (since 2024) (Note: The party was formerly part of the ID Party (2024).)
- European Parliament group: Europe of Sovereign Nations Group (since 2024)
- Colors: Black; Gold
- Slogan: Време е за Възраждане! ('It's time for Revival!')
- National Assembly: 12 / 240
- European Parliament: 3 / 17
- Municipalities: 1 / 265
- Sofia City Council: 3 / 61

Website
- vazrazhdane.bg

Revival (Bulgarian: Възраждане, romanized: Vazrazhdane) is a far-right political party in Bulgaria. Founded in August 2014, its chairman is Kostadin Kostadinov. The party is ultranationalist, pro-Russian, anti-EU, anti-NATO, and is opposed to COVID-19 vaccinations and spreads anti-vaccine and anti-LGBT rhetoric.

In the 52nd National Assembly of Bulgaria, Revival is the smallest parliamentary group, having only 12 seats. In the 2026 parliamentary election, it lost 60% of the seats it had in the previous assembly, where it was the third largest bloc (behind GERB–SDS and PP–DB) and the second largest party (behind GERB).

== History ==
In June 2014, Kostadin Kostadinov told media that there would be a Constituent Assembly on 2 August of the same year in the city of Pliska to create the party "Revival". The founders chose the day due to its significance as being the anniversary of the Ilinden Uprising. Kostadinov founded the party after he became unhappy following Krasimir Karakachanov's reelection as leader of IMRO-BNM in 2012.

=== Entrance into parliament ===
The party grew rapidly due to the Bulgarian political crisis. They first entered the Bulgarian National Assembly after the 2021 general election, gaining 13 seats. A member of Revival's parliamentary group left them in June 2022. The party would more than double its presence in the assembly, gaining 14 more seats in the 2022 general election and gaining another 10 seats in the 2023 general election bringing their total seats to 37. This came as the country drew closer to its adoption of the Euro, while the government was financially backing Ukraine in its defense against Russia. Only 30% of Bulgarians view Russia as a threat, and far more are worried about rising inflation and possible economic concerns with the adoption of the euro. Despite the party's pro-Russian rhetoric, observer Vesela Tcherneva, from the European Council on Foreign Relations, says that "Putin has lost some popularity so the campaign is not pro-Russia but anti-West, but it's the other side of the same coin". Additionally, the party has called for a public referendum on withdrawal from NATO and normalization of relations with Russia. The party has also supported the expansion of the Russian gas company Lukoil's presence in the country and to "renegotiate the conditions with the EU" either for a special status, or possible withdrawal.

Additionally, the party launched a petition that proposes postponing the adoption of the Euro until further notice. The petition collected over 604,000 signatures, significantly more than the 200,000 necessary to suggest a future referendum on the matter.

On 22 May 2023, Revival protesters stormed the EU offices in Sofia, dousing the interior with red paint while waving the Russian flag. President of the European Parliament Roberta Metsola called the protestors "vandals unhappy with our stance in support of Ukraine." while the Bulgarian government announced the attacks only strengthen their resolve to support Ukraine. On 16 June 2023, a microbrewery in Sofia was vandalized after standoffs with Revival with an antisemitic message scrawled on their window with a Star of David after the brewery posted a sign saying they don't serve members of Revival. The owners of the brewery, who are Jewish, filed an investigation with the Ministry of Interior for the attack to be prosecuted as an antisemitic hate crime.

=== Opposition to Denkov-Gabriel Government (2023–2024) ===
==== Protest activity ====
In mid-July 2023, members of We Continue the Change launched an official investigation into Revival for promoting violence, homophobia and "misanthropic propaganda." Namely, the prosecution cited a post on Revival's official telegram that consisted of the face of Solomon Passy, a former MP and founder of the Atlantic Club, as a prisoner in a Nazi concentration camp being taken away by the Schutzstaffel to be gassed with the caption, "If you don't want gas from Russia, come to us and we'll let you breathe some gas." In September 2023 Revival staged nationwide protests for the removal of all NATO bases in Bulgaria, waving Bulgarian and Russian national flags, blowing whistles and demanding an early election. The protests came shortly after the Bulgarian government ended an embargo on Ukrainian grain. During the protests Revival supporters rallied around a monument to the Red Army, which the government decided to remove. Additionally, the government deported one Russian and two Belarusian nationals connected to Revival on a recommendation by the State Agency for National Security.

==== Sofia City Councillors split ====
Upon the entrance of Revival MPs into the Sofia City Council, the party did not participate in negotiations to end the deadlock and elect a chairman of the city council and refused to support other nominees.

On 8 February, after three months of deadlock, 4 of the 7 Sofia city councillors from Revival voted in favour of Tsvetomir Petrov (PP-DB), who was selected as the compromise nominee after three-month long talks, subsequently being expelled both from the party and the councillors' group. The head of the Revival's group in the city council, Deyan Nikolov, accused the 4 city councillors of being "traitors" and alleged that they had been potentially bribed. The expelled city councillors defended their actions by claiming they had voted in favour of Petrov in order to end the deadlock. The split within the Revival group led to the de-listing of Revival as a group within the city council, due to it no longer being above the 5-member threshold.

The aftermath of the events in the city council ended up impacting the parliamentary group of Revival in the National Assembly, wherein Kostadinov demanded the resignation of three Revival MPs who had "vouched" for the inclusion of the expelled city councillors during the local elections. After their refusal, the three were expelled from the parliamentary groups and served out their term as Independent MPs. Expelled MP and former PG secretary, Nikolay Drenchev, later alleged that despite claims by Kostadinov that the party was now calm, the situation in the party remained tense and even claimed the party was attending sessions with a licensed psychiatrist.

==== Visit to Moscow ====
On 19 February, three Revival MPs visited Moscow at the invitation of the ruling party, United Russia, meeting with members of the State Duma and representatives of the Russian Ministry of Foreign Affairs.

The visit led the PP-DB parliamentary group to request that the MPs who participated in the visit be excluded from committees with significance for "national security". Additionally, the PP-DB MP Yavor Bozhankov sent a signal to the Prosecutors Office and DANS about potential illegal activity on the part of the three MPs. In response, Revival leader Kostadinov claimed the procedure for the expulsion of MPs from a committee did not exist within the rulebook and insisted that the MPs will continue to attend the committee meetings.

On 28 February, the point about the exclusion of two Revival MPs from the Foreign Affairs and Defense parliamentary committees was presented before the parliament by PP-DB, however, the measure was not supported due to the opposition of the other parliamentary parties.

=== Anti-Euro protests (2025) ===
On 22 February 2025, thousands of the party's supporters rallied in Sofia in opposition to the planned adoption of the euro. The demonstration began outside the Bulgarian National Bank where protestors immolated an effigy of Christine Lagarde. The protest then continued to a European Union facility in Sofia, which demonstrators attempted to storm. After being pushed away by police, some protestors threw paint and small explosives at the building. Commenting on the demonstration to the media, Kostadin Kostadinov explained "we are here to defend freedom". In a post to social media, EU Commission president Ursula von der Leyen denounced the attack as "outrageous".

Revival supported the referendum on ascension to the Eurozone proposed by President Rumen Radev in May 2025. Following the dismissal of the referendum by National Assembly chairwoman, Nataliya Kiselova, Revival held a (self-described) "popular assembly", at which they announced plans to organise a national protest on 31 May, as well as carry out acts of civil disobedience.

On 28 May, Revival once again proposed their referendum about ascension to the Eurozone before the National Assembly, however the motion was defeated.

On 31 May, protests organised by Revival were held in Sofia, as well as other towns in Bulgaria. During the protests, party leader Kostadin Kostadinov called for a protest to be held on the 4th of June, the date during which the convergence report about the feasibility of Bulgaria's membership in the Eurozone was set to be published. Revival claimed that 270,000 people participated in the nationwide protest on 31 May; however, those claims are disputed by law enforcement representatives.

During the protest on 4 June, Revival attempted to obstruct the functioning of the National Assembly by occupying the tribune. On 8 June, Revival held another protest against ascension to the Eurozone in front of the National Assembly building. Kostadinov further confirmed that Revival had sent letters to all heads of state and government within the European Union, appealing for them to obstruct Bulgaria's ascension into the Eurozone.

== Ideology ==
=== Economic policy ===
The party is opposed to the flat tax system in Bulgaria, advocating for the introduction of progressive taxation of up to 20% for high earners, albeit with no income tax for those earning the minimum wage, thereby reducing taxes on low earners. It supports abolishing VAT on food, medicines, books and textbooks.

The party has criticised Progressive Bulgaria's proposals for price controls as incompatible with a market economy.

The party calls for a 40% reduction in civil servants and a 50% reduction in the size of ministries in order to increase government efficiency.

The party strongly opposed Bulgarian adoption of the euro currency, seeking to stop Bulgaria's accession to the eurozone on multiple occasions.

=== Social policy ===
The party is strongly critical of the LGBT community, successfully proposing legislation banning promotion of non-traditional sexual orientation or gender identity in Bulgaria.

Revival is opposed to the EU Migration Pact, opposing Bulgarian ratification of it. It has also advocated for the deportation of refugees who do not meet refugee status criteria.

Revival rejects Bulgarian responsibility for the deportation of Jews from Bulgarian-administered regions of Yugoslavia and Greece during the Second World War as these were outside Bulgarian territory, claiming that Nazi Germany was to blame for the treatment of Jews in these regions and that Bulgaria had saved its own Jewish population. Nevertheless, it strongly opposed the demolition of the Monument to the Soviet Army in Sofia, claiming that the monument was important to the country's historical memory and served as a symbol to those who gave their lives to defeat fascism in Bulgaria.

=== Foreign policy ===
The party considers North Macedonia as the second Bulgarian state in the Balkans and claims to be working towards the country's unification with Bulgaria. It regards the "complete unification with North Macedonia and the revival and strengthening of the full state independence of a united Bulgaria" as the ultimate goal of its foreign policy.

== International relations ==
=== Cross-European affiliation and relations ===
Revival was a member of the Identity and Democracy Party from 31 January 2024. It was subsequently removed in early 2024 from the group's website

Following the 2024 European Parliament election, Revival was one of the first members of the Europe of Sovereign Nations Group in the European Parliament, alongside the various other European parties.

Revival also signed an official memorandum for cooperation "against the destruction of European civilisation" on the 23 August 2023, which was also signed by representatives from the following parties: the Hungarian Our Homeland Movement, the Dutch Forum for Democracy (FvD), the Czech Freedom and Direct Democracy (SPD), Alternative for Sweden (AfS) and the Swiss Mass Voll.

In December 2023, Revival participated in a conference in Belgrade hosted by the Serbian Party Oathkeepers and Dveri, alongside the Alternative for Germany (AfD) and the Our Homeland Movement.

On 12 April 2024, Revival organized the 'Sofia Declaration' with the Republic Movement, FvD, the Swiss Mass Voll, the Serbian Party Oathkeepers, Our Homeland Movement, AfS, the Moldovan Revival party and the Agricultural Livestock Party of Greece.

=== Ties to other European parties ===
Revival has developed a close relationship with the party Alternative for Germany, with Revival's chairman, Kostadin Kostadinov, attending the party's congress in July 2023. Revival additionally invited representatives from AfD, as well as the Moldovan party Revival to the annual commemoration of Liberation Day in 2024.

Revival has maintained cooperation with the Russian ruling party, United Russia, participating in the Forum "Freedom of Nations" hosted by the party. In April 2025, Revival signed a cooperation agreement with United Russia, which would see them exchange "experience, ideas and political practices."

The party has relations with the Alliance for the Union of Romanians (AUR), attending AUR conferences and campaigning jointly against restrictions during the COVID-19 pandemic. In March 2025, Kostadinov addressed a Bucharest rally in support of Romanian presidential candidate Călin Georgescu, at the invitation of AUR leader George Simion.

The party has also established cooperation with Debout la France and its leader, Nicolas Dupont-Aignan.

Kostadinov has also attended a conference hosted by Republika Srpska President Milorad Dodik, the leader of the Alliance of Independent Social Democrats in Bosnia and Herzegovina, with the two party leaders stressing their shared support for traditional family values.

=== Ties to parties outside Europe ===
Kostadinov, Revival's Chairman, has also claimed that the party has "begun friendly relations" with the African National Congress.

A Revival delegation, led by party vice-chairman Tsoncho Ganev, visited China between the 24 and 26 November 2024 as part of an official visit organised by the CCP.

The party has maintained relations with the Republicans for National Renewal, a donor organisation linked with the United States Republican Party, including a meeting between the head of the organisation, Mark Ivanyo, and Kostadin Kostadinov in November 2023.

In 2024, the party also had meetings with Republican Congressman Paul Gosar and officials from the 2024 Donald Trump presidential campaign.

The party expressed "full support" for Trump following the attempted assassination of Donald Trump.

The party has also voiced support for Trump's proposed annexation of Canada, Greenland and the Panama Canal by the United States. In April 2025, a Revival delegation met with Republican Congressmen Barry Moore and Keith Self and expressed support for replacing the euro on Bulgaria's currency board with the United States dollar, therefore tying the Bulgarian lev to the dollar. Revival MEP Rada Laykova has also cooperated with Republican Congressman Andy Ogles on opposing central bank digital currency.

== Leadership ==
- Kostadin Kostadinov – Chairman
- Petar Petrov – Vice chairman
- Tsoncho Ganev – Vice chairman
- Iskra Mihailova – Secretary

== Election results ==
=== National Assembly ===
Election	Leader	Votes	%	Seats	+/–	Status
2017	Kostadin Kostadinov	37,896	1.11 (#11)	0 / 240	New	Extra-parliamentary
Apr 2021	Kostadin Kostadinov	78,395	2.41 (#9)	0 / 240	0	Extra-parliamentary
Jul 2021	Kostadin Kostadinov	82,147	3.01 (#8)	0 / 240	0	Extra-parliamentary
Nov 2021	Kostadin Kostadinov	127,568	4.86 (#7)	13 / 240	▲13	Opposition
2022	Kostadin Kostadinov	254,952	10.18 (#4)	27 / 240	▲14	Snap election
2023	Kostadin Kostadinov	358,174	14.16 (#3)	37 / 240	▲10	Opposition
Jun 2024	Kostadin Kostadinov	295,915	13.78 (#4)	38 / 240	▲1	Snap election
Oct 2024	Kostadin Kostadinov	325,466	13.38 (#3)	33 / 240	▼5	Opposition
2026	Kostadin Kostadinov	137,940	4.19 (#5)	12 / 240	▼21	Opposition

=== European Parliament ===
Election	List leader	Votes	%	Seats	+/–	EP Group
2019	Tsoncho Ganev	20,319	1.04 (#13)	0 / 17	New	–
2024	Stanislav Stoyanov	281,439	13.98 (#4)	3 / 17	▲3	ESN

=== President ===
Election	Candidate	First round			Second round		
Election	Candidate	Votes	%	Rank	Votes	%	Result
2026	Kostadin Kostadinov	190,910	12.55	3rd	—N/a		Lost

== See also ==
- List of political parties in Bulgaria
