= Progressive Bulgaria =

Progressive Bulgaria Прогресивна България
- Abbreviation: PB
- Leader: Rumen Radev
- Co-chairs: Galab Donev; Dimitar Stoyanov; Elena Noneva; Todor Barbolov; Atanas Kalchev
- Founder: Rumen Radev
- Founded: 2 March 2026 (coalition); 17 April 2026 (party)
- Ideology: Left-wing populism; Left-wing nationalism; Social conservatism; Social democracy; Soft Euroscepticism
- Political position: Centre-left to left-wing
- Member parties: PDS; SDP; DNN; External support: VMRO-BND
- Colors: Dark green White
- National Assembly: 131 / 240
- European Parliament: 0 / 17

Website
- progresivnabulgaria.com

Progressive Bulgaria (Bulgarian: Прогресивна България, ПБ, romanized: Progresivna Balgariya, PB) is a left-wing populist and nationalist political party and coalition in Bulgaria led by Prime Minister Rumen Radev, who founded it to contest the 2026 Bulgarian parliamentary election. The coalition, presented on 2 March 2026, is composed of three major Bulgarian political parties as members, plus three smaller parties. On 17 April, Progressive Bulgaria was declared a party at its founding congress in Veliko Tarnovo. In the 2026 election, the coalition won a majority of seats in the National Assembly. On 8 May 2026, Rumen Radev was sworn in as Bulgaria's prime minister.

== History ==
=== Formation ===
On 2 March 2026, documents for a coalition called "Progressive Bulgaria" were submitted to the Central Electoral Commission of Bulgaria. The coalition, which was led by Former President Rumen Radev, included the following parties: the Political Movement "Social Democrats", led by Elena Noneva; the Social Democratic Party, led by Todor Barbolov; and the Our People Movement, led by Atanas Kalchev. Radev himself did not submit the documents; this was done by former Interim Prime Minister Galab Donev and former Defense Minister Dimitar Stoyanov. It was announced that Radev would not be part of the Progressive Bulgaria leadership; instead, Donev and Stoyanov would become co-chairs, as well as the leaders of the three mandate-carrier parties.

On 11 March, it was revealed that candidates from VMRO – Bulgarian National Movement would enter the lists of PB. According to party leader Krasimir Karakachanov, there is no formal agreement on the participation of VMRO candidates in the lists of "Progressive Bulgaria", but it was not ruled out that individual representatives would be included in them. The party had earlier announced its support for the coalition in a decision by the party's organizational council.

== Ideology ==
Progressive Bulgaria has been described as left-wing populist, left-wing nationalist, left-conservative, and socially conservative. It has been described as "ideologically positioned in the center-left" and to espouse "social democracy, social conservatism, and left-wing nationalism." It combines left-wing economic policies, such as increasing pensions and expanding state-owned healthcare, with conservative fiscal policies, social conservatism and sovereigntism. The party's ideology has been described as putting Bulgarian national interests first; it does not question Bulgaria's membership in the European Union and NATO, but plans to take a "more assertive" stance on energy, climate, and budget policies.

Publicist Yavor Siderov described Radev as a populist. In a Facebook post, Radev deemed his coalition "a response to Bulgarians' expectations for the dismantling of the oligarchic corruption model". As president, Radev has questioned Bulgaria's 2026 adoption of the euro and opposed sanctions against the Russian Federation. He, as well as the coalition itself, have been described as softly anti-Atlanticist or lenient towards Russia and sceptical of Ukraine in the context of the Russo-Ukrainian war. This assessment has been disputed, with Radev stating during his 2026 campaign that he would not veto EU aid to Kyiv if elected; however, he has repeatedly spoken against supplying weapons to Ukraine and criticised security agreements with the country.

Polish political scientist Jan Nowinowski described the party as similar to the Slovak party Direction – Social Democracy, led by Prime Minister Robert Fico; according to Nowinowski, Progressive Bulgaria offers pro-social and interventionist economic postulates and has conservative views in other spheres. He described the party as "nationalist, and at times sovereigntist", "verging on populism", and campaigning on anti-corruption, judicial reform, and fatigue with the political elite. OKO.press argues that the alliance is "not strictly speaking a left-wing party in the European sense", but rather a form of a "populist-nationalist left". The Centre for Eastern Studies described the party as centre-left conservative, and with a "centre-left but socially conservative profile". The Polish-language edition of Newsweek characterised the party in similar terms:

Nominally, Progressive Bulgaria is a centre-left party. But this left-wing stance is expressed mainly through socioeconomic promises; ideologically, the party is traditionalist. Central to its message are pledges to fight corruption; its slogans are otherwise very general, couched in populist language. To compare it to anything, it would be SMER — the party of Slovak Prime Minister Robert Fico, which was long part of the Socialist International but was recently expelled from it. Like SMER, Progressive Bulgaria represents the interests of the poorest, whilst also promoting nationalist slogans.

== Composition ==
Member parties

Party	Abbr.	Ideology	Leader	Member since
Progressive Bulgaria (party)	PB	Left-wing populism	Rumen Radev	17 April 2026
Political Movement "Social Democrats"	PDS	Social democracy	Elena Noneva	2 March 2026
Social Democratic Party	SDP	Social democracy	Todor Barbolov	2 March 2026
Our People Movement	DNN	Conservatism	Atanas Kalchev	2 March 2026

Supporting parties

Party	Abbr.	Ideology	Leader	Supporting since
VMRO – Bulgarian National Movement	VMRO-BND	National conservatism	Krasimir Karakachanov	11 March 2026

== Election results ==
=== National Assembly ===
Election	Leader	Votes	%	Place	Seats	+/–	Status
2026	Rumen Radev	1,444,920	44.59	1st	131 / 240	New	Majority

=== President ===
Election	Candidate	First round			Second round		
Election	Candidate	Votes	%	Rank	Votes	%	Result
2026	Iliana Iotova	528,951	34.76	1st	1,093,852	57.57	1st

== See also ==
- 2025–2026 Bulgarian protests, for events that preceded the formation of the party
- Alternative for Bulgarian Revival
- List of political parties in Bulgaria
