= 17th MMC – Plovdiv-province =

Bulgarian constituency

Coordinates: 42°10′N 24°45′E

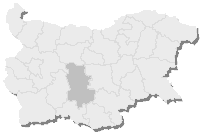
Map of Bulgaria, 17th MMC – Plovdiv-Province is highlighted

The 17th Multi-member Constituency – Plovdiv-Province is a constituency whose borders are the same as Plovdiv Province in Bulgaria, excluding the territory of Plovdiv Municipality.

== Background ==
In the 2009 Bulgarian parliamentary election the 17th Multi-member Constituency – Plovdiv elected 11 members to the Bulgarian National Assembly: 10 of which were through proportionality vote and 1 was through first-past-the-post voting.

== Members in the Bulgarian National Assembly ==
- Through first-past-the-post voting

Election	Member	Party
2009		

- Through proportionality vote

Election	Member	Party
2009		
2009		
2009		
2009		
2009		
2009		
2009		
2009		
2009		
2009		

== Elections ==
2009 election

- proportionality vote

Party	Votes	%	Change	Seats	Change	
Citizens for European Development of Bulgaria						
Coalition for Bulgaria						
Movement for Rights and Freedoms						
National Union Attack						
National Movement for Stability and Progress						
Blue Coalition						
Lider (Bulgaria)						
Order, Lawfulness, Justice						
Others				—		—
Total-Valid				'—		
Invalid			—	—	—	—
Total Turnout			—	—	—	—

- first-past-the-post voting

Party	Candidate	Votes	%	Change
Citizens for European Development of Bulgaria	Dimitar Lazarov			
Coalition for Bulgaria	Todor Petkov			
National Union Attack	Nikola Likov			
National Movement for Stability and Progress	Nonka Matova			
Blue Coalition	Iordan Bakalov			
Lider (Bulgaria)	Georgi Tsankov			
Order, Lawfulness, Justice	Maria Kapon			
Others				
Total Turnout			—	—

== See also ==
- 2009 Bulgarian parliamentary election
- Politics of Bulgaria
- List of Bulgarian Constituencies
