= Rositsa Kirova =

Bulgarian politician (born 1970)

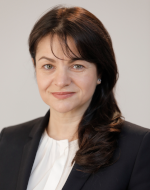
- Kirova in 2021

Member of the National Assembly
- Incumbent
- Assumed office 15 April 2022
- Constituency: Vidin

Personal details
- Born: 1 January 1970 (age 56)
- Party: GERB

Rositsa Lyubenova Kirova (Bulgarian: Росица Любенова Кирова; born 1 January 1970) is a Bulgarian politician of GERB. Since 2021, she has been a member of the National Assembly. She has served as a deputy speaker since 2023, having previously served from 2021 to 2022. She was a municipal councillor of Vidin from 2006 to 2015, and a candidate for mayor in the 2015 local elections.
