= There is Such a People =

Bulgarian populist political party

There is Such a People Има такъв народ
- Abbreviation: ITN
- Leader: Slavi Trifonov
- Founder: Slavi Trifonov
- Founded: 16 February 2020
- Headquarters: 70th Building, Odrin St., Sofia
- TV station: 7/8 TV
- Ideology: Populism; Social conservatism; Bulgarian nationalism
- Political position: Right-wing
- European affiliation: European Conservatives and Reformists Party
- European Parliament group: European Conservatives and Reformists Group
- Colours: Light blue Dark blue
- National Assembly: 0 / 240
- European Parliament: 1 / 17
- Sofia City Council: 3 / 61

Website
- pp-itn.bg

There is Such a People (Note: sometimes translated as There is Such a Nation) (Bulgarian: Има такъв народ, ИТН, romanized: Ima takav narod, ITN) is a populist political party in Bulgaria established by Bulgarian singer, TV host, and politician Slavi Trifonov. Self-described as a "political product", the party is named after one of Trifonov's own musical albums.

== History ==
=== Foundation ===
Trifonov originally attempted to found a political party under the name of "There is No Such State" (Bulgarian: Няма такава държава, romanized: Nyama takava darzhava). The application was turned down as the Supreme Court of Cassation of Bulgaria ruled that the party's proposed logo (a Bulgarian flag placed on top of an open human palm) violated the country's prohibition against the use of national symbols by political parties, causing him to change the name to "There is Such a People" and adopt a new logo.

=== April 2021 election ===
The party fared well in its first-ever election, the April 2021 Bulgarian parliamentary election, finishing second in the polls behind GERB. Trifonov won a seat in the National Assembly, but stated that he had contracted COVID-19 and as such demanded that he be allowed to attend the swearing-in ceremony remotely, which he was allowed to do. However, even after his recovery Trifonov refused to ever attend or even visit the parliament. After GERB failed to form a government, as per the Bulgarian constitution, ITN was handed the mandate to do so by the Bulgarian President. The party insisted on proposing a single-party cabinet, offering a chess player with no political experience as prime minister-designate. The proposal received no support from parliament, and as such the party withdrew its proposition before the deadline. Shortly thereafter, it stated that it would not support any other government and would seek new elections. As no majority had formed around any political party, the parliament was dissolved and snap elections were called for two months later.

=== July 2021 election ===
During the election campaign period, the party essentially refused to campaign or issue promises, largely staying out of the political debate. This was initially shown to be a winning move, as the party experienced a surge in popularity. Having faced criticism for never attending parliamentary sessions during the previous convocation, Trifonov did not put himself forward as a candidate, stating that it was "not his place" and that his job would be to "take on responsibility" from outside the National Assembly. In the July 2021 snap parliamentary election, ITN polled narrowly ahead of GERB, thus winning a plurality, though not a majority, in the National Assembly. ITN attempted to convince three members of Bulgaria's apolitical caretaker cabinet to join ITN as political ministers, but all three refused, stating that ITN had demanded public sector cuts, a zero-point budget deficit and the privatisation of the Bulgarian Development Bank as policy — demands that the ministers did not agree with.

Plans for a coalition formed around opposition to GERB were quickly dashed, as ITN declared that it would not take part in any coalition and would only rule by itself, with a "government of experts" consisting only of ITN party members. This immediately triggered backlash both politically and among the broader population, both due to the usage of power politics and the fact that ITN's proposed "government of change" was staffed largely by retired ex-NDSV politicians with a poor reputation among Bulgarians. The party proposed one of its own members, Nikolay Vasilev, for the post of Prime Minister. The proposal proved controversial and did not attract any political support. Moreover, Trifonov was widely criticised for not taking part in political negotiations, instead only communicating through Facebook posts. Trifonov rejected the criticism, stating that he would continue communicating through the social network, but sacked Vasilev's candidacy and promised to "renovate" his cabinet proposal. Bulgaria's remaining political parties stated that they would refuse to comment on Facebook posts and would wait for a formal political announcement.

The party then designated another prime ministerial candidate, Plamen Nikolov, who was revealed to have been chosen at a TV casting "for politicians" and had no prior political experience, also proving to be an unpopular candidate. More controversy then emerged, after an Austrian publication challenged a claim placed on Nikolov's profile page of him being an alumnus of the University of Klagenfurt in Austria. According to the publication, Nikolov's name did not appear in the university's student or graduate databases, nor in the Austrian Library Association archive, which maintains all works published by students in the country. In response, Nikolov stated that he had not graduated from the university, but only defended a postgraduate research project there. ITN's proposed single-party government did not find support among any of Bulgaria's other political parties. Following this revelation, Trifonov accused Democratic Bulgaria and Stand Up.BG! We are coming! of "betrayal" and withdrew his proposition, stating that ITN would in turn vote against any and all other proposed governments, regardless of composition. The party's deputy further stated that those parties could be considered "political genders" if they then attempted to form a government. This caused a small-scale constitutional crisis, as Bulgarian law did not explicitly provide the opportunity for a party to withdraw a nomination it had already made before voting. Bulgaria's parliamentarians attempted to remedy this and set up a legal mechanism through which it can be done, which had to be approved through a simple majority. This attempt failed, as ITN and GERB refused to attend the session and vote on the withdrawal. Following a second vote, the withdrawal was finally accepted and the proposed government was withdrawn. The party then refused to support any other parliamentary party's government proposal, leading once again to a parliamentary deadlock and snap elections.

=== November 2021 election and coalition ===
Following the 2021 Bulgarian general election, ITN suffered a major electoral defeat, losing more than 2/3 of its elected deputies and falling from first to fifth place in terms of both votes received and parliamentary representation. This forced the party into negotiations and subsequently led to a government being formed with ITN as the junior partner in a coalition comprising themselves, We Continue the Change, the Bulgarian Socialist Party and Democratic Bulgaria. Despite being granted four ministries, ITN did not get along well with its coalition partners. It shook the coalition as it introduced a competing candidate for director of the Bulgarian National Bank to run against the coalition's candidate and opposed the government's handling of Bulgaria–North Macedonia relations.

=== Withdrawal from government and split ===
On June 8, 2022, ITN withdrew its support for the coalition government led by Kiril Petkov after a dispute over the allocation of the government budget that compounded over previous disagreements. It helped the opposition remove the pro-government parliamentary speaker from his position, and subsequently voted in favor of a motion of no confidence against the Petkov Government brought by the opposition, leading to its adoption with 123 votes in favor to 116 opposed. The consequent collapse of Petkov's government made it the first government to be brought down by a no confidence vote in Bulgaria's modern history.

In regard to ITN's decision to withdraw from the government and the ruling coalition, 5 of their MPs left the party's parliamentary group on 13 June and were congratulated by Kiril Petkov. ITN and the secessionists held briefings on which they labeled each other "mafia". ITN and the ruling We Continue the Change did the same with each other too. The 5 MPs that left ITN's group declared that they will continue to support the ruling coalition. ITN said that the secessionists were "bought" by Kiril Petkov in order for the ruling coalition to not fall and that his party was making attempts to "buy" more ITN MPs. On 17 June another MP from ITN's group left them and joined the other 5 secessionists.

In the subsequent 2022 Bulgarian snap parliamentary election, held in October, the party obtained only 3.71% of the vote, thus falling below Bulgaria's 4% electoral threshold. Because of this, it lost all of its remaining seats in the National Assembly.

=== 2023 election ===
The party would return to the National Assembly after getting 4.11% of the party vote in the 2023 Bulgarian snap parliamentary election, earning them 11 seats in parliament.

The party's leader, Slavi Trifonov, expressed support for an expert government - hinting that ITN would support a government formed by GERB's PM candidate, Mariya Gabriel. However, a few days later Slavi Trifonov announced the party would not support the expert government formed by Mariya Gabriel arguing it lacked true expertise. The party also came out in opposition to the deal between Denkov and Gabriel for a government based on the rotation of Prime Ministers.

== Ideology and platform ==
=== Political position ===
Trifonov initially refused to position his party as either left or right, neither liberal nor conservative. When pressed by a journalist during an interview, he revealed that he opposed both progressive taxation and the Istanbul Convention on women's rights. When the journalist asked Trifonov if he thought that those positions were not right-wing conservative opinions, Trifonov admitted that his party would be "more likely conservative". Moreover, Trifonov stated that he was personally a right-winger, also opining that "whatever is good for the EU and NATO is also good for our motherland". Later, ITN stated that it would not support any government proposed by the Bulgarian Socialist Party (which had been granted the mandate to do so by the Bulgarian President), regardless of composition, largely because ITN considered the BSP a left-wing party. Economically, the party considered Assen Vassilev, the economics minister designated by Stefan Yanev's caretaker government, as being "too leftist". The party has further shifted to the right economically in 2023, openly saying that it was "economically right wing" and opposed to increased social spending during negotiations with other parties in the 49th National Assembly.

In 2021, the party said the Russo-Ukrainian war can only be resolved through diplomatic means. Trifonov backed military aid to Ukraine after the 2022 Russian invasion of Ukraine, including sending old armored personnel carriers in November 2023. However, as of 2024, the party is opposed to the deployment of Bulgarian soldiers in Ukraine or the use of Bulgarian airfields to strike Russian territory, has called for a greater European role in facilitating peace negotiations between the two sides, and is opposed to the provision of heavy weapons to Ukraine, such as the S-200 and S-300 missile systems, aircraft and tanks.

ITN has increasingly been identified with European nationalist movements. ITN also took a nationalist approach on relations with North Macedonia which led to the collapse of the Petkov Government. Additionally, due to their soft nationalist rhetoric, ITN gained voters from the established nationalist parties like IMRO, NFSB and Ataka. Trifonov was previously affiliated to the George's Day Movement. In December 2023, ITN expressed their intention to join the European Conservatives and Reformists group after the 2024 European Parliament election (like IMRO, RZS and RBZ before them) and ITN self-described themselves as a conservative party, the “ideology of common sense” with principles such as economic freedom and traditional family values.

=== Health, vaccines, and the COVID-19 pandemic ===
Deutsche Welle describes ITN as a party that could "turn anti-vax into state policy", stating that the party's parliamentary head, Toshko Yordanov, had supported and spread anti-vaccination conspiracy theories in parliament by claiming that vaccines do not reduce COVID-19 transmission. Trifonov rejected the accusation, stating that he would "not flirt with anti-vaxxers ... as that would be like flirting with death", adding that he himself is vaccinated against COVID-19. Despite this, ITN declared that recently adopted relaxations of COVID-19 measures for vaccinated individuals represented "discrimination" against non-vaccinated citizens and called for their abolition. Bulgaria's health minister, Stoycho Katsarov, defended the measures, stating that no additional lockdown measures had been introduced for those not vaccinated, merely relaxed for those that were. ITN also opposed an order by the health minister, which allowed local health authorities to impose additional lockdown measures and potentially require some schoolchildren to wear protective facemasks in in-person lessons during pandemic peaks. The party defined as "tyranny" an order by Plovdiv's Medical University that required students attending in-person lectures to either present vaccination certificates or recently conducted COVID-19 tests.

=== Electoral and administrative reform ===
The party has expressed support for a referendum on Bulgaria's to transition to a presidential republic. ITN claim that a presidential system would allow for a more clear division of responsibility between the National Assembly and President; they also described it as a potential solution to the Bulgarian political crisis.

The party has supported a switch to a First Past the Post system, as well as making it easier to organize referendums.

=== Policy platform ===
- Switching from a proportional representation system of voting to a constituency-based two-round system for national elections, and single transferable vote for EU and municipal council elections
- Halving the number of members in the National Assembly from 240 to 120
- Allowing remote electronic voting in elections and implementing elements of e-government
- Compulsory voting
- Introduction of some aspects of direct democracy, including direct elections of directors of the regional directorates and the heads of the regional departments of the Ministry of Interior, the Prosecutor General, and the Ombudsman
- Further integration with the European Union
- Further support to social security of families

== Election results ==
=== National Assembly ===
Election	Leader	Votes	%	Seats	+/–	Government
Apr 2021	Slavi Trifonov	564,989	17.36 (#2)	51 / 240	New	Snap election
Jul 2021	Slavi Trifonov	657,824	24.08 (#1)	65 / 240	▲14	Snap election
Nov 2021	Slavi Trifonov	249,726	9.39 (#5)	25 / 240	▼40	Coalition (2021–Oct 2022)
2022	Slavi Trifonov	96,071	3.71 (#8)	0 / 240	▼25	Extra-parliamentary
2023	Slavi Trifonov	103,971	4.11 (#6)	11 / 240	▲11	Opposition
Jun 2024	Slavi Trifonov	128,007	5.79 (#6)	16 / 240	▲5	Snap election
Oct 2024	Slavi Trifonov	165,160	6.56 (#7)	17 / 240	▲1	Coalition
2026	Slavi Trifonov	23,861	0.73 (#11)	0 / 240	▼17	Extra-parliamentary

=== European Parliament ===
Election	List leader	Votes	%	Seats	+/–	EP Group
2024	Ivaylo Vulchev	121,572	6.04 (#6)	1 / 17	New	ECR
