= October 2024 Bulgarian parliamentary election =

- 27 October 2024
- All 240 seats in the 51st National Assembly; 121 seats needed for a majority
- Turnout: 38.81% (▲4.38pp)
Party	Leader	Vote %	Seats	+/–
GERB–SDS	Boyko Borisov	25.52	66	−2
PP–DB	Kiril Petkov	13.75	36	−3
Revival	Kostadin Kostadinov	12.92	33	−5
DPS–NN	Delyan Peevski	11.13	29	−18
BSP–OL	Atanas Zafirov	7.32	19	0
APS	Dzhevdet Chakarov	7.24	19	New
ITN	Slavi Trifonov	6.56	17	+1
MECh	Radostin Vasilev	4.45	11	+11
Velichie	Ivelin Mihaylov	3.87	10	−3
This lists parties that won seats. See the complete results below.
Results by constituency (prior to recalculation)
Prime Minister before	Prime Minister after
Dimitar Glavchev (caretaker); Independent (Second Glavchev Government)	Rosen Zhelyazkov; GERB (Zhelyazkov Government)

Snap parliamentary elections were held in Bulgaria on 27 October 2024, after all three attempts to form a government following the latest June 2024 elections failed. This was the country's sixth snap election since 2021. This series of snap elections is the result of a political crisis affecting the country.

Eight parties passed the electoral threshold to win representation in the National Assembly, while Velichie came just 21 votes short to win representation. GERB–SDS had the best results by winning 25.5% of the vote, but were required to form an alliance with at least two other elected parties in order to achieve a voting majority in the National Assembly. The new elected 51st Parliament replaced the 50th Parliament when all elected members were sworn in on 11 November. After 11 voting rounds, Natalia Kiselova (BSP–OL) was elected as speaker of the National Assembly on 6 December. President Rumen Radev granted the first negotiation mandate to the largest party GERB-SDS on 15 January, which formed a minority government alongside BSP and ITN, with support from APS (Dogan). The government was led by GERB politician Rosen Zhelyazkov.

Velichie and all elected parties except DPS–NN (Peevski) contested the results and conduct of the parliamentary election by submitting complaint cases to the Constitutional Court; and the court subsequently appointed an independent expert panel to investigate all complaints. Following a recalculation of the results, the Constitutional Court ruled in March 2025 that 16 of the 240 MPs were elected illegally, and that Velichie had passed the threshold.

== Background ==
=== Elections and government breakdown ===
The June 2024 elections, held at the same time as the European Parliament elections, had the lowest turnout (33%) since the end of communist rule in 1989. It resulted in GERB–SDS winning 25% of the votes and 68 seats, with no party or alliance obtaining enough seats to form a majority in the National Assembly. The new elected 50th Parliament replaced the 49th Parliament, when all elected members were sworn in on 19 June. Government formation attempts were given to GERB, PP–DB and There is Such a People (ITN), with the final attempt failing on 5 August.

As a consequence, President Rumen Radev instead appointed the Vice President of the Bulgarian National Audit Office, Goritsa Grancharova-Kozhareva, as the next caretaker prime minister on 9 August. Grancharova-Kozhareva was granted ten days to form a proposal for the next caretaker government to be appointed on 20 August, and the upcoming next parliamentary elections were scheduled for 20 October 2024. Grancharova-Kozhareva made the controversial decision to propose that the incumbent minister of the interior, Kalin Stoyanov, should remain in his role, but this was opposed by President Radev. Radev rejected the government proposal, delaying the upcoming election.

Following the rejection of Grancharova-Kozhareva, Radev re-appointed Dimitar Glavchev as the caretaker prime minister, and his government proposal was sworn in on 27 August, and the elections were set for 27 October.

=== Changes in the Assembly's composition prior to the election ===
One MP was expelled from the BSP by its national council on 18 June, before being sworn in.

The Velichie parliamentary group comprised 13 MPs after the election. On 5 July, six MPs broke away from the group, dissolving it.

A rift in Movement for Rights and Freedoms (DPS) surrounding Delyan Peevski saw 17 MPs expelled and a further eight leave.

As of the end of July 2024, the composition of the Assembly was as follows:

Composition of the 50th Parliament
(by the end of July 2024)

GERB-SDS (68 MPs)
PP–DB (39 MPs)
VAZ (38 MPs)
DPS (22 MPs)
BSPzB (18 MPs)
ITN (16 MPs)
Independents expelled from DPS
(25 MPs, led by Ahmed Dogan)
Independents expelled from the former Velichie
(7 MPs, led by Nikolay Markov)
Independents from the dissolved Velichie
(6 MPs, led by Ivelin Mihaylov)
Independent expelled from BSPzB
(2 MPs, Kaloyan Metodiev and Mikhail Stavrev)

== Electoral system ==
The 240 members of the National Assembly were elected by open list, proportional representation from 31 multi-member constituencies ranging in size from four to nineteen seats. The electoral threshold was 4% for all parties or electoral coalitions, with seats allocated according to the largest remainder method using a Hare quota.

== Parties ==
=== Contesting parties and coalitions ===
Below is the official list of parties and coalitions that registered lists for the Bulgarian Parliamentary elections. Boxes shaded in grey are not officially parties in the coalitions according to the electoral commission, but they are key groups in each alliance.

It was reported that despite suggesting they could run, Volt, Bulgarian National Union and VMRO did not submit their lists in time to partake in the elections. NDPS also wished to partake, but its registration was deleted.

#	Party or coalition		Ideology	Leader	2024 result	
#	Party or coalition		Ideology	Leader	Votes (%)	Seats
1	Democrats for Responsibility, Solidarity and Tolerance		Turkish minority interests Erdoğanism	Taner Alimolla	DNP	
2	People's Voice		Right-wing populism	Svetoslav Vitkov	0.30%	0 / 240
3	Socialist Party "Bulgarian Way"		Left-wing nationalism Euroscepticism	Angel Dimov	DNP	
4	Greatness		Bulgarian nationalism Anti-corruption	Albena Pekova	4.52%	13 / 240
5	Bulgars		Bulgarian nationalism National conservatism	Georgi Georgiev-Goti	0.04%	0 / 240
6	My Country Bulgaria	Bulgarian Left	Democratic socialism	Boyan Kirov	Solidary Bulgaria	
6	My Country Bulgaria	United Social-Democracy	Social democracy	Yordan Gergov	Solidary Bulgaria	
6	My Country Bulgaria	My Country Bulgaria	Anti-Western sentiment Left-wing nationalism	Ivaylo Drazhev	DNE	
7	There is Such a People		Populism; Social conservatism	Slavi Trifonov	5.79%	16 / 240
8	DPS – A New Beginning	Movement for Rights and Freedoms	Turkish minority interests Liberalism	Delyan Peevski	16.56%	47 / 240
8	DPS – A New Beginning	New Leaders	Direct democracy	Georgi Tityukov	DNE	
8	DPS – A New Beginning	Bulgarian Voice	National conservatism Euro-atlanticism	Georgi Popov	0.15%	0 / 240
9	Brigade		Anti-establishment	Arben Khavalyov	DNP	
10	Party of the Greens		Green politics Left-wing nationalism	Vladimir Nikolov	0.25%	0 / 240
11	Pravoto		Populism	Maria Koleva	DNP	
12	Revival		Ultranationalism; Right-wing populism	Kostadin Kostadinov	13.38%	38 / 240
13	Alliance for Rights and Freedoms	Just Bulgaria United Patriots (SBOR)		Dimitar Iliev	DNP	
13	Alliance for Rights and Freedoms	Agrarian People's Union	Agrarianism	Rumen Yonchev	Blue Bulgaria	
13	Alliance for Rights and Freedoms	DPS dissidents	Liberalism; Turkish minority interests	Dzhevdet Chakarov	DNE	
13	Alliance for Rights and Freedoms	Bulgaria Awake	National conservatism Anti-corruption	Nikolay Barekov	DNP	
14	Bulgarian National Union – New Democracy		Ultranationalism	Boyan Rasate	0.10%	0 / 240
15	Bulgarian Union for Direct Democracy		Direct democracy Bulgarian nationalism	Georgi Nedelchev	0.04%	0 / 240
16	Blue Bulgaria	Conservative Union of the Right	National conservatism Anti-communism	Petar Moskov	1.52%	0 / 240
16	Blue Bulgaria	Bulgarian Democratic Forum	National conservatism Anti-communism	Zhaklin Toleva	1.52%	0 / 240
16	Blue Bulgaria	Democratic Action Movement	Liberal conservatism	Stefan Ivanov	1.52%	0 / 240
16	Blue Bulgaria	Bulgarian New Democracy	Liberal conservatism	Valeri Georgiev	1.52%	0 / 240
16	Blue Bulgaria	Conservative Bulgaria	National conservatism	Boris Yachev	1.52%	0 / 240
16	Blue Bulgaria	Radical-Democratic Party	Social conservatism Anti-communism	Zahari Petrov	1.52%	0 / 240
16	Blue Bulgaria	United Agrarians	Agrarianism; Liberal conservatism	Vacant	DNP	
17	Morality, Unity, Honour		Anti-corruption; Social conservatism	Radostin Vasilev	2.98%	0 / 240
18	GERB–SDS	GERB	Social conservatism Pro-Europeanism	Boyko Borisov	23.99%	68 / 240
18	GERB–SDS	SDS	Christian democracy Anti-communism	Rumen Hristov	23.99%	68 / 240
18	GERB–SDS	George's Day Movement	National conservatism Bulgarian nationalism	Lyuben Dilov Jr.	23.99%	68 / 240
19	Attack		Bulgarian nationalism Ultranationalism	Volen Siderov	DNP	
20	People's Party "Truth and Only the Truth"		Anti-vaccination; Anti-establishment	Ventsislav Angelov	0.11%	0 / 240
21	Direct Democracy		Bulgarian nationalism Direct democracy	Petar Klisarov	0.24%	0 / 240
22	Free Voters	Green Union	Green politics	Danail Dimov	DNP	
22	Free Voters	Republicans for Bulgaria	Conservatism; Economic liberalism	Tsvetan Tsvetanov	DNP	
22	Free Voters	Union of Free Democrats	Liberal conservatism	Radoslav Katsarov	DNP	
23	Bulgaria of Labor and Reason		Anti-Western sentiment Hard Euroscepticism	Georgi Manolov	DNP	
24	Competence, Responsibility and Truth		Right-wing populism	Svetozar Saev	We the Citizens	
25	Russophiles for Bulgaria	Bulgarian Communist Party	Communism	Vladimir Hristov	0.11% (NB)	0 / 240
25	Russophiles for Bulgaria	Party of the Bulgarian Communists	Communism; Marxism–Leninism	Ivan Penchev	0.11% (NB)	0 / 240
25	Russophiles for Bulgaria	Russophiles for the Revival of the Fatherland	Russophilia; National conservatism	Valentin Grigorov	0.11% (NB)	0 / 240
26	PP–DB	We Continue the Change	Liberalism; Anti-corruption	Kiril Petkov; Assen Vassilev	13.92%	39 / 240
26	PP–DB	Democrats for a Strong Bulgaria	Conservatism; Anti-communism	Atanas Atanasov	13.92%	39 / 240
26	PP–DB	Yes, Bulgaria!	Liberalism; Anti-corruption	Hristo Ivanov	13.92%	39 / 240
27	Bulgarian Rise		National conservatism	Stefan Yanev	0.56%	0 / 240
28	BSP – United Left	Bulgarian Socialist Party	Social conservatism Social democracy	Atanas Zafirov	6.85% (BSPzB)	19 / 240
28	BSP – United Left	Ecoglasnost	Green politics Environmentalism	Emil Georgiev	6.85% (BSPzB)	19 / 240
28	BSP – United Left	Political Club "Trakiya"	Left wing nationalism	Stefan Nachev	6.85% (BSPzB)	19 / 240
28	BSP – United Left	Stand Up.BG	Social democracy Left-wing populism	Maya Manolova	1.42% (SB)	0 / 240
28	BSP – United Left	Alternative for Bulgarian Revival	Social democracy Social conservatism	Rumen Petkov	0.69% (The Left)	0 / 240
28	BSP – United Left	Movement 21	Social democracy	Tatyana Doncheva	0.69% (The Left)	0 / 240
28	BSP – United Left	Political Movement "Social Democrats"	Social democracy	Elena Noneva	0.69% (The Left)	0 / 240
28	BSP – United Left	Bulgarian Social Democracy – EuroLeft	Social democracy	Aleksandr Tomov	0.10% (Rose Coalition)	0 / 240
28	BSP – United Left	Communist Party of Bulgaria	Marxism–Leninism	Alexander Paunov	Neutral Bulgaria	
28	BSP – United Left	Bulgarian Spring	Left-wing nationalism	Svetoslav Mandikov	We the Citizens	
28	BSP – United Left	Movement for Social Humanism	Progressivism	Alexander Radoslavov	DNP	
28	BSP – United Left	European Security and Integration	Roma Minority politics	Toma Tomov	DNP	
28	BSP – United Left	Union for the Fatherland	Left-wing nationalism	Vasil Tochkov	DNP	
28	BSP – United Left	Arise	Left-wing nationalism	Aleksandr Bogdanov	DNP	
29	Independent		Anti-corruption; Pleven localism	Chavdar Popov	DNP	

=== DPS leadership dispute ===
On 27 August, the central leadership organisation of the DPS removed Delyan Peevski as chairman of the party, and seven MPs close to Peevski were expelled from the party. This move has been linked to Ahmed Dogan, MP and honorary chairman of the party. Peevski called the move unconstitutional, and gained control of the official party website. This follows the rift in the party following the election, where the parliamentary group split. The controversy surrounding Peevski has led to two groups emerging, DPS – A New Beginning and Democracy, Rights and Freedoms, with both groups registering as electoral coalitions with the acronym DPS in order to get around the rules of the electoral commission. After DPS–Peevski was recognized to be the legitimate DPS by the Supreme Administrative Court of Bulgaria, DPS–Dogan changed their name to "Alliance for Rights and Freedoms" (АПС instead of ДПС) and registered without listing DPS as a member of the alliance. The DPS mayors split 50:50 between both groups.

== Campaign ==
=== Campaign finances ===
Ten days prior to the election, it was reported that 1.2 million BGN (US$680k) was spent on advertising in the media, with ITN spending the most, DPS–Peevski second most, and BPS–OL third.

The spending of each electoral group which won seats is as follows:

Party or coalition	Spending (in BGN)
PP–DB	1,309,218
DPS – A New Beginning	1,162,812
Revival	996,540
Alliance for Rights and Freedoms	957,722
GERB–SDS	901,518
There is Such a People	758,536
BSP – United Left	706,987
Morality, Unity, Honour	300,000+

=== Campaign slogans and websites ===
The following list present the official campaign slogans and websites of parties that contested the election:

Party or coalition	Slogan	Website
DOST	For a better future	N/A
People's Voice	For a future without political garbage! For a more clean and sacred (republic)!	N/A
SP "Bulgarian Way"	N/A	Website
Greatness	From the ashes - to the sun	Website
Bulgars	Bulgaria above all!	Website
My Country Bulgaria	Unity creates strength!	N/A
There is Such a People	The logical choice	Website
DPS – A New Beginning	It's time for a new beginning	Website
Brigade	To Save Bulgaria	N/A
Party of the Greens	Vote for the Greens with No. 10	Website
Pravoto	Give a chance for yourself... Vote for Legality!	Website
Revival	Enough experiments! Its time for Revival!	Website
Alliance for Rights and Freedoms	To defend democracy and statehood!	Website
BNS–ND	N/A	Website
Bulgarian Union for Direct Democracy	The system has completely failed! It is time for change to come!	Website
Blue Bulgaria	Believe strongly, act decisively.	Website
Morality, Unity, Honour	MECH or the mafia!	Website
GERB–SDS	Security and stability.	Website
Attack	The attack continues	N/A
Truth and Only Truth	Immediate change	N/A
Direct Democracy	New system	Website
Free Voters	Responsible choice	N/A
Bulgaria of Labor and Reason	For an independent Bulgaria of labour and reason outside the EU and NATO	Website
Competence, Responsibility and Truth	Who will return our fatherland?	N/A
Russophiles for Bulgaria	Bulgaria is stronger together with Russia!	Website
PP–DB	Let us care for Bulgaria.	Website
BSP – United Left	Time for decisions	Website

== Opinion polls ==
Local regression of polls conducted, excluding "none of the above"

The opinion poll results below were recalculated from the original data by excluding undecided and non-voters.

121 seats are needed for a parliamentary majority and all parties need to pass the 4% threshold to be elected to the National Assembly.

Polling firm	Fieldwork date	Sample	GERB–SDS	DPS		PP–DB	Vaz	BSP–OL			ITN	Vel	MECh	SB	Others	NOTA	Lead
Polling firm	Fieldwork date	Sample	GERB–SDS	APS	DPS–NN	PP–DB	Vaz	BSP	L!	IsBg	ITN	Vel	MECh	SB	Others	NOTA	Lead
October 2024 election	27 Oct 2024	—N/a	25.5; 66	7.3; 19	11.2; 30	13.7; 37	12.9; 35	7.3; 20			6.6; 18	3.9; 0	4.4; 12	1.0; 0	3.3	3.3 (Note: In official election results, None of the above votes don’t count as a proportion of the total vote. In the June 2024 election, they reached a total number of 63,913 or approximately 2.9%, if measured proportionally.)	7.4
Alpha Research	20–23 Oct	1,000	26.5	7.9	7.4	14.9	14.2	7.2			6.1	2.6	3.8	2.7	6.7	3.0 (Note: This poll reported the percentage respondents do not support any party, however the rest of the data was recalculated to exclude these percentages.)	11.6
Exacta	19–22 Oct	1,070	26.7	8.1	7.3	14.6	14.3	7.5			6.0	2.6	3.7	2.8	6.3	2.0	12.1
Trend	16–22 Oct	1,002	24.9	7.8	7.0	14.8	15.2	6.5			6.6	3.6	4.0	1.7	7.9	4.3	9.7
Gallup International	10–21 Oct	1,007	26.1	7.8	7.6	16.2	14.9	7.1			6.2	3.8	4.1	1.2	4.9	3.4	9.9
MarketLinks	15–20 Oct	1,014	27.2	9.3	8.1	16.0	14.9	7.9			5.2	4.1	1.8	3.1	2.0	2.7	11.2
Sova Haris	11–17 Oct	800	25.6	8.7	6.5	14.7	14.5	9.8			6.8	4.2	3.1	1.6	4.1	2.6	11.2
Mediana	8–13 Oct	978	27.7	9.8	5.6	13.9	15.5	10.0			7.9	–	2.7	3.4	3.7	11.4	12.2
Gallup International	28 Sep – 6 Oct	806	25.7	8.3	6.9	16.6	15.4	7.1			6.3	3.2	3.8	1.1	5.7	3.1	9.1
Market Links	25 Sep – 1 Oct	1,011	27.1	9.9	7.5	16.5	15.6	6.2			4.0	3.8	–	–	9.8	2.4	10.6
Trend	17–24 Sep 2024	1,003	24.8	8.5	5.8	15.1	15.6	6.9			6.9	3.4	3.5	1.6	7.9	3.9	9.2
Alpha Research	18–24 Sep 2024	1,000	26.0	8.6	6.6	15.7	15.4	6.8			5.9	3.5	3.0	2.8	5.5	2.6	10.3
11 Sep 2024			DPS splits into APS and DPS–NN														
5 Sep 2024			BSP and other leftist parties join to form BSP – OL														
Market Links	14–23 Aug 2024	1,038	26.2	18.4		17.1	13.7	7.4	–	–	3.8	2.4	–	–	8.0	3.0	7.8
Gallup International	1–9 Aug 2024	802	25.2	14.5		15.2	14.2	7.3	–	–	6.2	3.6	3.4	–	10.4	2.5	10.0
Market Links	20–28 Jul 2024	1,008	25.8	14.4		17.2	12.3	7.7	–	–	5.8	4.2	–	–	8.6	2.8	8.6
Market Links	18–25 Jun 2024	1,014	24.4	18.3		16.2	13.8	5.3	–	–	5.4	5.0	–	–	6.7	5.8	6.1
June 2024 election	9 Jun 2024	—N/a	24.7; 68	17.1; 47		14.3; 39	13.8; 38	7.1 (Note: As BSP for Bulgaria); 19	0.7; 0	1.5 (Note: As Solidary Bulgaria.); 0	6.0; 16	4.7; 13	3.0; 0	1.6; 0	7.7	2.9 (Note: In official election results, None of the above votes don’t count as a proportion of the total vote. In the June 2024 election, they reached a total number of 63,913 or approximately 2.9%, if measured proportionally.)	7.4

== Conduct ==
Allegations of vote buying are common occurrences in the Bulgarian electoral cycle, with allegations of vote buying happening more often in rural areas, which have more poverty and people who are less educated. During the election campaign, a deputy, Ivaylo Mirchev, from PP–DB, claimed that there was widespread vote buying being conducted by DPS–Peevski, claiming people were being paid up to 500 BGN (US$286) per vote. One of the leaders of the list for DPS–Peevski appeared to admit to vote buying in a social media poll.

The interior minister, Atanas Ilkov, told a parliamentary hearing that he had received two alerts of vote buying by 25 September. A national police operation that was set up to target the practice began operating two days later. On 18 October, Ilkov said his ministry had received 259 allegations of vote buying.

Deutsche Welle received reports, especially in Kardzhali Province, that DPS–Peevski was pressuring people to vote for the party in fear of losing their jobs, with already 60 jobs lost in the municipal administration. They also reported that Peevski personally was paying for various small-scale public repairs.

=== Dzheyhan Ibryamov case ===
On 2 October, the lead candidate of DPS–Dogan in Shumen, Dzheyhan Ibryamov, was arrested by the Prosecutors Office on the charge of attempting to buy vote and influence peddling. Following a request by the Prosecutors Office, the CEC and Chairwoman of the National Assembly, Raya Nazaryan, agreed to lift Ibryamov's immunity as a candidate in the elections. Despite the criminal case against him and his arrest, Ibryamov was still authorised to participate in the elections.

The arrest and criminal prosecution of Ibryamov provoked negative reactions from key DPS–Dogan figures, with the coalition de facto leader, Dzhevdet Chakarov, calling for the cancellation of the upcoming elections.

=== Post-result reports ===
In identified polling stations with a risk of high levels of controlled or bought votes, GERB and DPS–Peevski were the leading parties.

According to the Institute for the Development of the Public Environment, there were 827 polling stations with this risk, and bTV reported some voters in Blagoevgrad did not deny that there was vote buying occurring. The coordinator of the 'You Count' organisation, which asks voters to report election misconduct, claimed that there were entire municipalities at risk of high levels of bought and controlled votes. He claimed the results did not reflect the will of the Bulgarian citizens because the results were so skewed.

An investigation was released on the state broadcaster, BNT, claimed to show that discrepancies of up to 100 votes in one electoral district, as well as other malpractices elsewhere.

The Second Glavchev caretaker government, in its official report, stated that they believe that the elections had taken place in a free and fair environment, and cited positive comments made by international electoral observers. In a briefing shortly after the elections, Caretaker Minister of the Interior Atanas Ilkov claimed that no serious differences in the level of vote-buying had been noted by the Ministry and that there was no evidence of the use of state institutions in order to influence the elections outcome.

== Results ==
Exit polls showed a GERB victory with 26.4% of the vote, with the PP getting 14.9%, and Revival 12.9%.

The following table outlines the partial results by party. The national electoral threshold at 4% is calculated using the total specified votes cast for parties and independent candidates, and not the total of all valid votes which also include "None of the above" votes. Velichie received 3.9992% of the specified vote, and therefore lost its parliamentary representation by missing just 21 votes to reach the electoral threshold.

As of 22:03 Eastern European Time (UTC+02:00) on 27 October 2024, exit polls showed GERB–SDS was projected to win 65 to 76 seats, with PP–DB securing 37 to 42 seats and Revival claiming 35 to 36 seats. Parallel vote tabulation showed slightly different projections: 63 to 69 for GERB–SDS, 35 to 38 for PP–DB and 35 to 36 for Revival.

=== Results prior to the recalculation ===
The following are the results before the constitutional court ordered a recalculation of them based on a partial recount.

Party	Votes	%	Seats	+/–
GERB–SDS	642,973	25.52	69	+1
We Continue the Change – Democratic Bulgaria	346,063	13.74	37	–2
Revival	325,466	12.92	35	–3
DPS – A New Beginning	281,356	11.17	30	–17
BSP – United Left	184,403	7.32	20	+1
Alliance for Rights and Freedoms	182,253	7.23	19	New
There is Such a People	165,160	6.56	18	+2
Morality, Unity, Honour	111,965	4.44	12	+12
Velichie	97,438	3.87	0	–13
Blue Bulgaria	26,054	1.03	0	0
Bulgarian Rise	10,318	0.41	0	0
Russophiles for Bulgaria	8,860	0.35	0	New
Direct Democracy	7,952	0.32	0	0
People's Voice	7,298	0.29	0	0
Free Voters	6,293	0.25	0	New
Party of the Greens	4,897	0.19	0	0
Attack	3,965	0.16	0	0
My Country Bulgaria	2,781	0.11	0	New
People's Party "Truth and Only the Truth"	2,463	0.10	0	0
Pravoto	2,360	0.09	0	0
Democrats for Responsibility, Solidarity and Tolerance	2,260	0.09	0	0
Bulgarian National Union – New Democracy	2,230	0.09	0	0
Competence, Responsibility and Truth	2,022	0.08	0	New
Bulgars	1,737	0.07	0	New
Bulgarian Union for Direct Democracy	1,694	0.07	0	0
Socialist Party "Bulgarian Way"	1,570	0.06	0	New
Bulgaria of Labor and Reason	1,444	0.06	0	New
Brigade	1,181	0.05	0	New
Independent	2,000	0.08	0	New
None of the above	82,619	3.28	–	–
Total	2,519,075	100.00	240	0
Valid votes	2,519,075	98.00		
Invalid/blank votes	51,523	2.00		
Total votes	2,570,598	100.00		
Registered voters/turnout	6,619,877	38.83		
Source: Central Electoral Commission

=== Results after the recalculation ===
The following are the preliminary results after the recalculation was undertaken. The seat difference is compared to the election in June, rather than the change from the initial results.

Party	Votes	%	Seats	+/–
GERB–SDS	642,521	25.52	66	–2
We Continue the Change – Democratic Bulgaria	346,074	13.75	36	–3
Revival	325,358	12.92	33	–5
DPS – A New Beginning	280,246	11.13	29	–18
BSP – United Left	184,361	7.32	19	0
Alliance for Rights and Freedoms	182,254	7.24	19	New
There is Such a People	165,191	6.56	17	+1
Morality, Unity, Honour	111,993	4.45	11	+11
Velichie	97,497	3.87	10	–3
Blue Bulgaria	26,045	1.03	0	0
Bulgarian Rise	10,311	0.41	0	0
Russophiles for Bulgaria	8,855	0.35	0	New
Direct Democracy	7,933	0.32	0	0
People's Voice	7,289	0.29	0	0
Free Voters	6,290	0.25	0	New
Party of the Greens	4,900	0.19	0	0
Attack	3,972	0.16	0	0
My Country Bulgaria	2,771	0.11	0	New
People's Party "Truth and Only the Truth"	2,460	0.10	0	0
Pravoto	2,350	0.09	0	0
Democrats for Responsibility, Solidarity and Tolerance	2,253	0.09	0	0
Bulgarian National Union – New Democracy	2,225	0.09	0	0
Competence, Responsibility and Truth	2,014	0.08	0	New
Bulgars	1,727	0.07	0	New
Bulgarian Union for Direct Democracy	1,694	0.07	0	0
Socialist Party "Bulgarian Way"	1,555	0.06	0	New
Bulgaria of Labor and Reason	1,445	0.06	0	New
Brigade	1,173	0.05	0	New
Independents	2,004	0.08	0	New
None of the above	82,619	3.28	–	–
Total	2,517,380	100.00	240	0
Valid votes	2,517,380	97.98		
Invalid/blank votes	51,791	2.02		
Total votes	2,569,171	100.00		
Registered voters/turnout	6,619,877	38.81		
Source: BNT

=== Maps ===
Most voted-for party by province

GERB-SDS's results by province

PP–DB's results by province

DPS-NN's results by province
Winning party by abroad countries

== Aftermath ==
The new elected 51st Parliament replaced the 50th Parliament, when all elected members were sworn in on 11 November. The official start of the process for exploring the first negotiation mandate in order to form a new government, awaited a prior election of the speaker for the 51st National Assembly. After 11 voting rounds, Natalia Kiselova (BSP–OL) was elected as speaker of the National Assembly on 6 December. The unelected party Velichie and all elected parties, except DPS–NN (Peevski), contested the results and conduct of the parliamentary election by submitting complaint cases to the Constitutional Court; and the court subsequently appointed an independent expert panel with a given deadline on 10 January 2025 to investigate all complaints.

=== Election of the speaker ===
The election of a speaker for the 51st National Assembly is required before it can begin its work, which include conducting upcoming votes on potential government formation proposals. The Bulgarian President will only start the process of handing out the exploring government forming mandates, once a speaker of the Parliament has been elected.

The election of the speaker of the National Assembly was previously used by GERB as a key part of coalition negotiations. GERB again declared that as the largest party, they should elect the speaker and his party would not partake in coalition talks if this was not to be the case. PP–DB had previously stated they would not vote to elect a GERB speaker.

Initially, the GERB and PP–DB candidates, Raya Nazaryan and Andrey Tsekov respectively, made it into the run-off vote, but neither could get a majority of the votes. The results table of the two run-off votes in round 1 is displayed, which was similar to those of rounds 2 and 3.

Chairperson of the National Assembly run-off vote (1st round, 11 Nov); Raya Nazaryan (GERB–SDS)
Yes: • GERB-SDS (68)	68 / 239
No: • VAZ (35); • DPS–NN (Peevski) (30); • PP–DB (21); • ITN (18); • MECh (12); • BSP–OL (5)	121 / 239
Abstentions: • APS (Dogan) (19); • PP–DB (16); • BSP–OL (15)	50 / 239
Result	No (120 votes required for majority)

Chairperson of the National Assembly run-off vote (1st round, 11 Nov); Andrey Tsekov (PP–DB)
Yes: • PP–DB (37); • APS (Dogan) (19); • MECh (12)	68 / 239
No: • VAZ (35); • DPS–NN (Peevski) (30); • ITN (18); • GERB–SDS (3)	86 / 239
Abstentions: • GERB–SDS (65); • BSP–OL (20)	85 / 239
Result	No (120 votes required for majority)

At the opening of the Assembly, the oldest MP acted as the interim speaker; in this case, it was Silvi Kirilov from ITN. In the third round of voting, ITN suggested Kirilov should be elected as a 'temporary speaker', The vote failed but failed to get to the run-off. However, in rounds 4-9, PP–DB chose to support Kirilov. Kirilov came close in several rounds to get the necessary votes, and would have been elected in the seventh round if all PP–DB MPs had voted with their group. The results of this run-off are shown below.

Chairperson of the National Assembly run-off vote (7th round, 28 Nov); Raya Nazaryan (GERB–SDS)
Yes: • GERB–SDS (69)	69 / 238
No: • Vaz. (34); • PP–DB (32); • DPS–NN (Peevski) (30); • APS (Dogan) (19); • ITN (18); • BSP–OL (14); • MECh (12)	159 / 238
Abstentions: • BSP–OL (5); • PP–DB (5)	10 / 238
Result	No (120 votes required for majority)

Chairperson of the National Assembly run-off vote (7th round, 28 Nov); Silvi Kirilov (ITN)
Yes: • Vaz. (34); • PP–DB (34); • APS (Dogan) (19); • ITN (18); • MECh (12)	117 / 238
No: • GERB–SDS (69); • DPS–NN (Peevski) (30); • BSP–OL (3); • PP-DB (2)	104 / 238
Abstentions: • BSP–OL (16); • PP–DB (1)	17 / 238
Result	No (120 votes required for majority)

BSP had attempted to organise a majority around their candidate, excluding GERB and DPS–Peevski In the eighth round, GERB decided to withdraw their support for Nazaryan in favour of BSP's candidate, Nataliya Kiselova. Kiselova made it to the run-off, but failed to reach a majority. Kiselova and Kirilov continued to fail to be elected, with Kiselova almost receiving a majority following the backing of DPS–Peevski in the tenth round. However, finally on 6 December, following BSP agreeing to a cordon sanitaire around DPS–Peevski, Kiselova was elected in the eleventh round with the support of GERB, PP–DB, DPS–Dogan and BSP. One MP from each parliamentary group except DPS–Peevski was also elected as deputy speakers. The result of the final speaker election is below.

Chairperson of the National Assembly run-off vote (11th round, 6 Dec); Silvi Kirilov (ITN)
Yes: • Vaz. (34) • APS (Dogan) (19) • ITN (18) • PP–DB (16) • MECh (11)	98 / 234
No: • GERB–SDS (66) • DPS–NN (Peevski) (29) • BSP–OL (18) • PP–DB (6)	119 / 234
Abstentions: • PP–DB (14) • GERB–SDS (3)	17 / 234
Result	No (118 votes required for majority)

Chairperson of the National Assembly run-off vote (11th round, 6 Dec); Natalia Kiselova (BSP–OL)
Yes: • GERB–SDS (68) • PP–DB (35) • APS (Dogan) (19) • BSP–OL (18)	140 / 233
No: • Vaz. (34) • DPS–NN (Peevski) (29) • ITN (18) • MECh (11) • GERB–SDS (1)	93 / 233
Abstentions:	0 / 233
Result	Yes ✅ (117 votes required for majority)

=== Government formation ===
Following the results, the parliament remained fragmented, with no clear pre-existing majority being evident. On 29 October, a Bulgarian correspondent from the news network Deutsche Welle suggested the following coalition options were the most likely possibilities to occur, based on the election results and considering the positions stated by the parties during the election campaign:

Coalition Partners	Seats	Status in the National Assembly	Notes
GERB, PP–DB, APS		Majority (125/240)	
GERB, PP–DB, BSP		Majority (126/240)	
GERB, PP–DB, ITN		Majority (124/240)	
GERB, PP–DB, BSP, APS, ITN		Qualified majority (163/240)	This coalition could exclude one of the latter three parties and still retain a majority.
GERB, BSP, APS, ITN (Final)		Majority (126/240)	
GERB		Minority (69/240)	A GERB minority government, would require that minimum 62 GERB MPs vote in favour of this among 121 present MPs (or 69 GERB MPs among 121-137 present MPs), in order to satisfy the requirement to achieve a voting majority among the present MPs convened within the minimum quorum of the National Assembly, with the remaining elected MPs forming a silent majority of absentees or abstentions.

A new caretaker government shall be formed by the Bulgarian President, if all three government formation attempts mandated by the constitution fails. The procedure for appointing a caretaker government was recently changed by amendments to the Constitution adopted by the 49th National Assembly, but those changes were challenged for lack of constitutionality by President Radev for a second time on 20 November 2024.

==== Party positions ahead of the first negotiation mandate ====
GERB's leader, Borisov, claimed victory following the elections and declared that he would be willing to cooperate with all parties except for Revival, if they were willing to support GERB's program. Speaking at GERB's National Forum meant to discuss the election results, Borisov predicted that new elections were the most likely outcome of the next National Assembly. However, Borisov did call for a GERB, PP–DB, BSP, ITN government with himself as the prime minister; the party had ruled out governing with DPS–Peevski, Vaz, DPS–Dogan and MECh.

PP–DB, which finished second, called for a cordon sanitaire around DPS–Peevski, and urged all parties to sign an agreement to this effect, which would also include a commitment to support anti-corruption legislation and judicial reform. They said that signing this was a pre-condition for negotiating with any other party. This cordon was supported by DPS–Dogan, ITN and MECh. ITN signed it on the accepted condition PP–DB would agree to fix electoral rolls GERB rejected the concept of signing agreements prior to negotiations.

DPS–Peevski claimed attempts to exclude them were undemocratic and an attempt to sideline ethnic minority voter interests.

The BSP, in a statement after the election, did not explicitly rule out participation in a government with any of the other parliamentary represented parties, however made clear that any decision about government participation would have to be taken by all parts of the party and broader coalition. BSP also suggested they would not support a government led by Borisov.

DPS–Dogan wanted a Euro-Atlanticist coalition without Peevski, and argued for a GERB–PP–DB government.

MECh's leader, Radostin Vasilev, initially proposed a coalition excluding GERB and both wings of the DPS, where MECh would take the interior ministry.

==== Negotiations ahead of the first mandate ====
On 13 November, GERB met with BSP and ITN in closed negotiations to focus on policy rather than the makeup of a government. BSP also met with representatives of PP–DB, agreeing areas of policy they could jointly work on, though BSP did not sign PP–DB's cordon.

On 14 November, Revival announced that they would also initiate their own negotiations to form government without GERB nor the two wings of DPS. PP–DB for announced that they would not attend any negotiations or govern with Revival.

On 22 November, Borisov suggested the leaders of GERB and PP–DB should meet, which was agreed upon on 25 November with Borisov not present. At this stage, GERB declared they wished to choose the Prime Minister, with Borisov himself as the most likely candidate. He would lead a GERB–PP–DB–BSP–ITN government. PP–DB declared they would not support Borisov as Prime Minister, so he withdrew the suggestion on 26 November. Borisov also declared his party would return the first negotiation unfulfilled, likely leading to another election.

==== Party consultations ====
The official start of the process for exploring the first negotiation mandate was conditioned on the election of a speaker for the National Assembly. Following the speaker's election on 6 December, the President invited all elected parliamentary groups – except DPS–NN – over to consultation meetings between 10–12 December, to discuss initial party positions in regards to the first negotiation mandate. The consultation aimed to facilitate consensus to form a government with the President as a mediator. The President explained he had not invited DPS–NN to consultations as they had ruled themselves out of taking part in forming a government.

During the consultations, GERB leader, Boyko Borisov reiterated that GERB would only negotiate with PP–DB, BSP and ITN and that he should be Prime Minister. PP co-leader, Kiril Petkov, made clear that PP would not engage in any negotiations with GERB until they signed the cordon; however, co-chair of the PP–DB parliamentary group and member of Yes, Bulgaria!, Nadezhda Yordanova, indicated that the two Democratic Bulgaria parties were inclined to negotiate with GERB without any preconditions in order to fulfil the first mandate, but this would require GERB to incorporate all of the cordon's policy proposals into the governing agreement.

Vaz stated they would not support or be part of any government formed under the first or second negotiation mandate, and would only work to attempt forming a minority government around their own programme if they were granted the third mandate. BSP stated that they were ready to negotiate with all parties except DPS–NN, but would only support formation of a cabinet under the first mandate if it was a transitional or expert cabinet, and emphasized the future prime minister of such cabinet should not be closely tied to any of the political parties. APS was ready to negotiate for a potential government formation with all parties except DPS-NN and Revival. ITN stated they would be ready to negotiate with all parties except DPS–NN, but would not support Boyko Borisov as Prime Minister. MECh would not support or negotiate with GERB nor DPS–NN.

==== Government formation following party consultations ====
After the initial consultations, GERB invited ITN, BSP and DB from PP–DB over to bilateral negotiation meetings. The President expected to hand over the first negotiation mandate to GERB at the first working day in 2025, which mean the GERB-led initial negotiations should have been concluded before 6 January 2025.

On 16 December, the first round of talks between GERB's negotiation team and representatives of DB took place. The meeting led to a joint declaration, where they came to consensus around building a "stable, pro-European majority", and further rounds of negotiations focusing on policy were scheduled.

During the negotiations, the parliament was asked by the caretaker Prime Minister Dimitar Glavchev to approve the signing of a security cooperation agreement with Ukraine. This was opposed by Vaz, BSP and MECh, but with GERB trying to form a government with BSP, they postponed this decision for a non-caretaker government to take.

On 19 December, Borisov suggested that he did not need to be Prime Minister in a GERB-led government, instead he said it would be a collective decision. The following day, GERB and DB began drafting a joint governance agreement reflecting the results of their meetings held so far, with a mind to reach out to BSP and ITN if they could reach consensus on key topics.

Negotiations between GERB and DB broke down after three weeks, reportedly due to disagreement over who should be Prime Minister. GERB was proposing Rosen Zhelyazkov, a key figure in the party, but DB wanted one who was not a leading political figure.

In the attempt to revive the negotiations, President Radev opted to extend the date for when he will hand over the first negotiation mandate to GERB by a few days.

Negotiations with ITN and BSP were resumed by GERB on 8 January. On 12 January, the leadership council of DPS–Dogan were presented to a draft government agreement reached between GERB, ITN and BSP (collectively representing 107 MPs), and accepted an official invitation to begin negotiations with these three parties on "support for the formation of a regular government". Negotiations with PP–DB had not been resumed after they were terminated by GERB on 5 January.

The National Council of BSP gathered on 12 January and voted to approve forming a government together with GERB and ITN, where the party had been offered to appoint: Atanas Zafirov as Deputy Prime Minister without portfolio, Borislav Gutsanov as Minister of Labor and Social Policy, Ivan Valentinov Ivanov as Regional Minister, Manol Trifonov Genov as Minister of Environment and Water, and Ivan Maksimov Peshev as Minister of Sports. The speaker of the National Assembly, Natalia Kiselova (BSP), clarified the current draft agreement on governance and the structure and composition of the GERB-ITN-BSP government, had outlined that GERB had the right to appoint the Prime Minister (as long as they did not appoint Borisov), and that each of the parliamentary groups participating in the cabinet negotiations will have the right to appoint a deputy prime minister, meaning the government is expected to have three deputy prime ministers. Most of the wider BSP–OL coalition approved the agreement, but several figures spoke out against joining government with GERB, and Stand Up BG, Movement 21 and Bulgarian Spring subsequently left the coalition.

On 13 January, APS announced that their parliamentary group had received a mandate from their leadership structure to continue negotiations and support regular government. Unofficial sources from APS elaborated they were however not ready to approve the offer that they had received, which saw them support the government and there were no guarantees for a cordon sanitaire surrounding the influence of DPS–NN (Peevski).

==== First negotiation mandate ====
President Radev announced he would hand over the first negotiation mandate to GERB on 15 January. GERB confirmed they would propose formation of a GERB-ITN-BSP minority government, provided negotiations with APS would end up with an agreement for them to vote in support for such government. On 14 January, APS signed an agreement with the negotiation teams to support formation of the GERB-ITN-BSP minority government led by Prime Minister Rosen Zhelyazkov, and the Central Operational Bureau of APS officially approved the agreement the following day. The National Assembly approved the proposed GERB-ITN-BSP government and inaugurated its 19 ministers (11 from GERB, four from ITN, and four from BSP) in a vote on 16 January.

Investiture; Rosen Zhelyazkov (GERB); Zhelyazkov Government
Ballot →	16 January 2025
Required majority →	absolute majority among present MPs (120 of 239)
Yes: • GERB–SDS (68) • BSP–OL (20) • APS (Dogan) (19) • ITN (18)	125 / 239
No: • PP–DB (37) • Vaz. (35) • DPS–NN (Peevski) (30) • MECh (12)	114 / 239
Abstentions:	0 / 239
Result	Yes ✅
Source: BTA

The Zhelyazkov Government pledged to present its governance and legislative programme within a month after its inauguration, and Prime Minister-designate Zhelyazkov revealed in advance that "its top priority will be requesting a convergence report as part of the procedure to eurozone accession, the 2025 budget, stabilizing the institutions and restoring inter-institutional dialogue".

=== Contestation of the results and election conduct ===
Velichie, which according to the results remained just below the 4% threshold with exactly 3.9992% of the popular vote, alleged that the elections had been rigged against them and promised to contest the election results. They specifically accused GERB and DPS–Peevski of electoral fraud. The party staged protests in Sofia for multiple days in a row calling for the annulment of the results. There were reports that enough votes to put Velichie into the Assembly were misallocated to other parties in the vote count.

The conduct of the election had allegations of mass vote buying and voter manipulation, leading civil society organisations to call for the annulment of the results. President Rumen Radev noted the large amount of evidence supporting allegations of mass vote buying and called on the Ministry of Interior to reveal which parties were most complicit in the practice. ITN leader Slavi Trifonov endorsed Radev's calls and additionally called for the resignation of the Second Glavchev caretaker government due to their mishandling of the elections. The BSP similarly called on the Prosecutors Office to respond to the allegations of mass vote buying and irregularities. PP–DB said they wanted a comprehensive check of the results, pointing to irregularities like high turnout, high numbers of invalid ballots and discrepancies. Revival have also called for a general recount of the results of the elections, and they claimed to have calculated that between 400,000 and 500,000 votes were bought by all parties except them.

On 7 November, vice-president Iliana Iotova called the new parliament illegitimate. This was criticised by Boyko Borisov, who called on Iotova to apologise or otherwise not go ahead with the first sitting of the parliament if she believed it to be illegitimate. Iotova refused to apologise and reiterated claims serious irregularities in the conduct of the elections.

The following parties have called for a full or partial annulment of the election: the BSP, DPS–Dogan, GERB, ITN, MECh, and Velichie. Multiple parties also announced they would collect signatures to send a partial annulment case to the Constitutional Court, which requires the support of 48 MPs. ITN's case was sent with the signatures of 67 deputies of the last parliament, coming from their party, PP–DB, DPS–Dogan, BSP and Velichie. BSP and Vaz also submitted a case with 55 signatures, and argued the president should appoint the cabinet.

On 26 November, the Constitutional Court admitted all five election result complaint cases challenging the legality of the parliamentary election for a combined review. An appointed panel of 18 experts was granted a deadline on 10 January 2025 to investigate all complaints and conduct an independent audit of the election results, including a recount of all votes cast at 1777 polling stations. After completing the hand counting of over 400,000 ballots, the expert panel handed over their investigative report on 14 January 2025.

On 26 February 2025, the Constitutional Court ordered the recalculation of the results based on a partial recount of the election, citing a report that found voting discrepancies in almost half of precincts sampled as part of the audit.

==== Results recalculation ====
Borisov declared that if the government, which has the support of 125 assembly members, were to lose its majority following the recalculation of results, the government would either continue as a minority government or negotiate with DB.

On 7 March, the state-owned "Information Services" agency in charge of the recalculation sent a letter to the Constitutional Court claiming to have found errors in the expert recount and asked the court to review its ruling. The Central Electoral Commission (CEC) said the errors may have been due to the withholding of data in some areas, leading to a delay, confirmed to be approximately 780 votes. The Constitutional Court, in turn, requested that the CEC and Informational Services simply provide the recalculation with notes of potential discrepancies.

The Constitutional Court accused the involved bodies of delaying their ruling by not providing recount data.

President Radev called for the Central Electoral Commission to clarify the situation and support the Constitutional Court, in order to restore trust in the electoral process. Politicians from several parties condemned the bodies involved.

On 10 March, the Information Services agency published some results of the recount, suggesting all parties in parliament would lose votes. The largest decrease was for DPS–Peevski (234 votes), GERB (135 votes) and Revival (103 votes). Velichie, the party closest to the threshold, was set to have a decrease of 32 votes, meaning they were likely to remain below the threshold.

The conflict between the involved institutions led to an emergency session of the National Assembly. Following the testimonies of representatives of the institutions, GERB called for an open session of the Constitutional Court in order to determine how the recount was conducted. ITN supported this, and called for a hearing of the experts who had conducted the recount. Revival called for the resignation of the CEC, the head of the Information Services agency and the Constitutional Court. Thousands, including senior PP–DB figures, protested the process.

On 12 March, the National Assembly approved a declaration requesting that the Constitutional Court provide greater transparency about the recount and undertake further steps to establish the validity of the preceding elections. They further heard testimonies from some of the experts involved in the recount, who described some of the discrepancies found by the recount and confirmed that they had received empty boxes from certain electoral sections. The testimony of the experts led to accusations by ITN MP, Toshko Yordanov, that the Constitutional Court was potentially responsible for the disappearance of the ballots. The Constitutional Court in turn claimed that they had requested the missing ballots from the CEC, but didn't receive them.

On 13 March, the Constitutional Court declared that 16 sitting deputies in the National Assembly were illegally elected, and instructed the CEC to present a new composition of the Assembly.

The court's decision resulted in the following changes:

- The threshold to pass the 4% barrier was raised to 97,391 votes, something which Velichie passed.
- All parties' votes shifted, including DPS–Peevski receiving 1,110 fewer votes.
- ITN, MECh and GERB had 3 illegally elected MPs, DPS–Peevski and Vaz. had 2 each, and DPS–Dogan, PP–DB, and BSP–OL had 1 each.

The court suggested that there was more electoral fraud than had been found, but that it did not have the power to recognize it. Following the ruling, the Organisation for Fair Elections presented its analysis of the results, and suggested 238,000 votes could have been at risk of manipulation, the highest for the last five elections.

=== Government instability ===
With the Constitutional Court determining Velichie had passed the threshold and gained 10 seats in the National Assembly, the government's support was bought down to 121 out of 240 deputies. However, Borisov said that, because one government deputy was sick, the government de facto had a majority of 1 (120 to 119).

Prior to the Constitutional Court decision, Peevski alluded that his group in the National Assembly may provide support for the incumbent government if they were to lose their majority in the recalculation. After the decision, Borisov declared that the government would fall if Peevski did not support its budget. As DPS–Dogan had previously said they would refuse to support a government which included Peevski, they sought clarity on what the parliamentary majority of the government was. On 17 March, Prime Minister Zhelyazkov insisted that the government was stable, and there was no alternative majority that could be formed. Regardless, Peevski said that the government would be forced to work with him, and said his party would support the budget.

On 20 March, DPS–Peevski and the government, without DPS–Dogan, elected a member of the Constitutional Court.

Following the disputes, on 1 April, the top figures of DPS–Dogan met to reconsider their position supporting the government. They decided to continue the support for the cabinet until Bulgaria joined the Eurozone, but said they would set conditions on their support for the government.

On 15 April, DPS–Dogan announced they would withdraw their support for the government. The government said it would continue to govern. The government was set to face a vote of no confidence on 16 April, but it survived as Peevski said he would support the government, while PP–DB declared they would abstain.
