= Zhelyazkov Government =

Government of Bulgaria (2025–2026)

- 105th Cabinet of Bulgaria
- 2025–2026
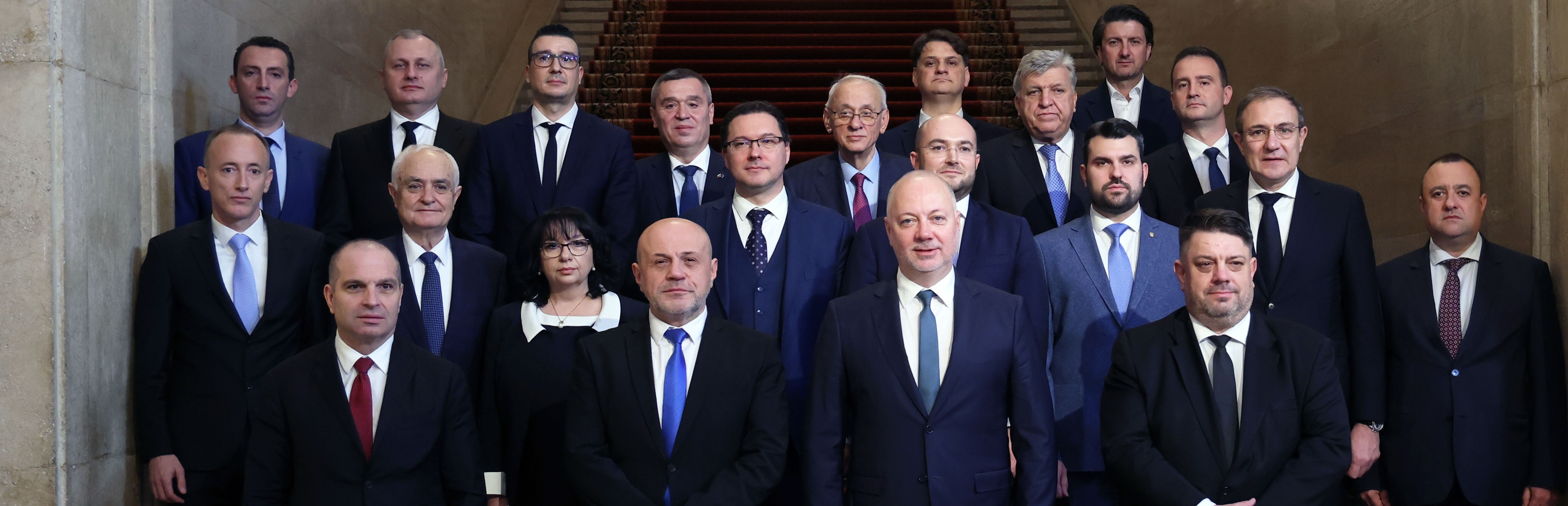
- Zhelyazkov Cabinet
- Date formed: 16 January 2025
- Date dissolved: 19 February 2026

People and organisations
- President: Rumen Radev; Iliana Yotova
- Prime Minister: Rosen Zhelyazkov
- Deputy Prime Minister: Tomislav Donchev, GERB; Atanas Zafirov, BSP; Grozdan Karadzhov, ITN
- No. of ministers: 21
- Ministers removed: 0
- Total no. of members: 21
- Member parties: GERB–SDS; BSP–OL; ITN; Supported by: DPS–NN (Note: Delyan Peevski, leader of DPS–NN, has committed to providing confidence and supply to the government.)
- Status in legislature: Minority coalition
- Opposition parties: PP–DB; Revival; APS; MECh; Velichie

History
- Election: October 2024
- Legislature term: 51st National Assembly
- Predecessor: Glavchev II
- Successor: Gyurov

The Zhelyazkov Government was the 105th cabinet of Bulgaria. It was approved by the parliament of Bulgaria on 16 January 2025. The cabinet is a minority coalition government with ministers nominated from GERB, BSP–OL and ITN. The cabinet resigned on 11 December 2025 after weeks of anti-government protests in the whole country and abroad over its economic policies and its perceived failure to tackle corruption. The government resignation was approved by the National Assembly on 12 December. On February 19, 2026, the cabinet handed over power to the caretaker government of Andrey Gyurov.

The cabinet was initially elected with the support of APS. However, on 16 April 2025, following disagreements with the government and the passing of legislation with DPS–NN, the party announced it would no longer support the government. The government's primary commitment has been the country's entry into the eurozone in 2026.

Though the government is not committed to creating a formal deal, it has been widely reported on and accepted that the government's majority depends on the support of DPS–NN. Prior to the approval of Bulgaria's accession to the Eurozone in July 2025, PP–DB, the largest parliamentary opposition, had pledged to abstain in no-confidence votes.

| Portfolio | Minister | Took office | Left office | Party |
|---|---|---|---|---|
| Prime Minister | Rosen Zhelyazkov | 16 January 2025 | 19 February 2026 | GERB |
| Deputy Prime Minister without portfolio | Atanas Zafirov | 16 January 2025 | 19 February 2026 | BSP |
| Deputy Prime Minister and Minister of Innovation and Growth | Tomislav Donchev | 16 January 2025 | 19 February 2026 | GERB |
| Deputy Prime Minister and Minister of Transport and Communications | Grozdan Karadzhov | 16 January 2025 | 19 February 2026 | ITN |
| Minister of Finance | Temenuzhka Petkova | 16 January 2025 | 19 February 2026 | GERB |
| Minister of Defence | Atanas Zapryanov (Note: Nominated by GERB.) | 16 January 2025 (reappointed) | 19 February 2026 | Independent |
| Minister of Foreign Affairs | Georg Georgiev | 16 January 2025 | 19 February 2026 | GERB |
| Minister of Interior | Daniel Mitov | 16 January 2025 | 19 February 2026 | GERB |
| Minister of Justice | Georgi Georgiev | 16 January 2025 | 19 February 2026 | GERB |
| Minister of Health | Silvi Kirilov | 16 January 2025 | 19 February 2026 | ITN |
| Minister of Education and Science | Krasimir Valchev | 16 January 2025 | 19 February 2026 | GERB |
| Minister of Agriculture and Foods | Georgi Tahov | 16 January 2025 (reappointed) | 19 February 2026 | Independent |
| Minister of Environment and Waters | Manol Genov | 16 January 2025 | 19 February 2026 | BSP |
| Minister of Energy | Zhecho Stankov | 16 January 2025 | 19 February 2026 | GERB |
| Minister of Tourism | Miroslav Borshosh | 16 January 2025 | 19 February 2026 | GERB |
| Minister of Economy and Industry | Petar Dilov | 16 January 2025 | 19 February 2026 | ITN |
| Minister of Regional Development and Public Works | Ivan Ivanov | 16 January 2025 | 19 February 2026 | BSP |
| Minister of Culture | Marian Bachev | 16 January 2025 | 19 February 2026 | ITN |
| Minister of Youth and Sports | Ivan Peshev | 16 January 2025 | 19 February 2026 | BSP |
| Minister of Labour and Social Affairs | Borislav Gutsanov | 16 January 2025 | 19 February 2026 | BSP |
| Minister of Electronic Governance | Valentin Mundrov | 16 January 2025 (reappointed) | 19 February 2026 | Independent |

Votes of no confidence
| Proposer | Sector | Date of submission | Date of vote | Yes | No | Abstentions | Absentees | Outcome |
|---|---|---|---|---|---|---|---|---|
| Revival, MECh and Velichie | foreign policy | 26 March 2025 | 3 April 2025 | 54: Revival (33); MECh (11); Velichie (10) | 150: GERB-SDS (66); DPS-NN (29); DPS-DPS (19); BSP-OL (19); ITN (17) | 0 | 36: PP-DB (36) | unsuccessful |
| Revival, MECh and Velichie | fight against corruption | 10 April 2025 | 17 April 2025 | 72: Revival (33); DPS-DPS (19); MECh (11); Velichie (9) | 130: GERB-SDS (66); DPS-NN (28); BSP-OL (19); ITN (17) | 0 | 38: PP-DB (36); DPS-NN (1); Velichie (1) | unsuccessful |
| Revival, MECh and Velichie | fiscal policy | 27 June 2025 | 4 July 2025 | 54: Revival (33); MECh (11); Velichie (10) | 130: GERB-SDS (65); DPS-NN (27); BSP-OL (17); ITN (17); Independent (4) | 0 | 56: GERB-SDS (1); PP-DB (36); DPS-NN (2); BSP-OL (2); APS (15); Velichie (1) | unsuccessful |
| Revival, MECh and Velichie | environment and water | 3 July 2025 | 11 July 2025 | 83: Revival (32); PP-DB (17); APS (14); MECh (10); Velichie (10) | 131: GERB-SDS (64); DPS-NN (29); BSP-OL (19); ITN (15); Independent (4) | 0 | 26: GERB-SDS (2); PP-DB (19); Revival (1); ITN (2); APS (1); MECh (1) | unsuccessful |
| PP-DB, APS and MECh | internal security and justice | 12 September 2025 | 18 September 2025 | 101: PP-DB (35); Revival (33); APS (12); MECh (11); Velichie (10) | 133: GERB-SDS (65); DPS-NN (28); BSP-OL (19); ITN (17); Independent (4) | 0 | 6: GERB-SDS (1); PP-DB (1); DPS-NN (1); APS (3) | unsuccessful |
| PP-DB, APS and MECh | economic policy | 5 December 2025 | 11 December 2025 | 106: PP-DB (36); Revival (33); BSP-OL (1); APS (15); MECh (10); Velichie (10); Independent (1) | 0 | 0 | 134: GERB-SDS (66); DPS-NN (29); BSP-OL (18); ITN (17); MECh (1); Independent (3) | unsuccessful |

Zhelyazkov Government approval rating
| Polling Firm | Fieldwork date | Approval | Disapproval | Unsure/no opinion | Net |
|---|---|---|---|---|---|
| Trend | 13–20 September 2025 | 23% | 66% | 11% | −43 |
| Myara | 4–12 September 2025 | 17.4% | 69.2% | 13.4% | −52 |
| Alpha Research | 7–14 July 2025 | 26.2% | 39.3% | 34.5% | −13 |
| Trend | 12–18 May 2025 | 26% | 57% | 17% | −31 |
| MarketLinks | 18–30 Apr 2025 | 25% | 48% | 27% | −23 |
| Myara | 3–13 Apr 2025 | 19.2% | 66.0% | 14.8% | −47 |
| MarketLinks | 22–30 Mar 2025 | 22% | 46% | 32% | −24 |
| Trend | 10–16 Mar 2025 | 27% | 50% | 23% | −23 |
| MarketLinks | 22 Feb.–2 Mar 2025 | 27% | 46% | 27% | −19 |
| Myara | 6–16 Feb 2025 | 26.8% | 56.7% | 16.5% | −30 |
| MarketLinks | 25 Jan.–2 Feb 2025 | 27% | 40% | 33% | −13 |
| Trend | 24 Jan.–30 Jan 2025 | 32% | 39% | 29% | −7 |
| Alpha Research | 15 Jan.–20 Jan 2025 | 39% | 29% | 32% | +10 |
