= Atanas Zafirov =

Bulgarian politician

- Атанас Зафиров
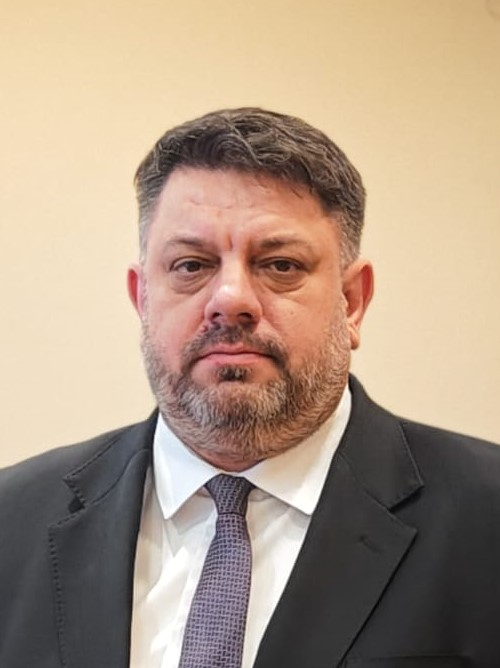
- Zafirov in 2025

Deputy Prime Minister of Bulgaria
- In office 16 January 2025 – 11 February 2026 Serving with Tomislav Donchev and Grozdan Karadzhov
- Prime Minister: Rosen Zhelyazkov
- Preceded by: Lyudmila Petkova

Leader of the Bulgarian Socialist Party
- In office 15 June 2024 – 7 February 2026
- Preceded by: Korneliya Ninova
- Succeeded by: Krum Zarkov

Member of the National Assembly
- In office 15 April 2021 – 30 April 2026
- Constituency: See list: 21st MMC – Sliven (2021–2022); 6th MMC – Vratsa (2022–2024); 4th MMC – Veliko Tarnovo (2024); 25th MMC - Sofia (2024–2025)
- In office 21 May 2013 – 26 January 2017
- Constituency: 2nd MMC – Burgas

Personal details
- Born: Atanas Zafirov Zafirov; 29 September 1971 (age 55) Burgas, PR Bulgaria
- Party: BSP
- Spouse: Gergana Zafirova (m. 1998; died 2023)
- Children: 2
- Education: Veliko Tarnovo University
- Occupation: Politician; historian; economist

Atanas Zafirov Zafirov (Bulgarian: Атанас Зафиров Зафиров; born 29 September 1971) is a Bulgarian politician who has served as Deputy Prime Minister of Bulgaria since 2025. A member of the Bulgarian Socialist Party, which he currently leads, he previously served as Member of the National Assembly from 2013 to 2017 and from 2021 to 2025.

== Early life and education ==
He was born on 29 September 1971 in Burgas.

Zafirov attended Veliko Tarnovo University, graduating with a degree in "Bulgarian History and Language" in 1994. He received a second degree in "Finance" from the university in 2007. In 2019, Zafirov received a degree from the Georgi Rakovski Military Academy in national security.

== Political career ==
According to Zafirov's personal recollections, he had been interested in politics from around the age of 14, when he joined the youth movement of the Bulgarian Communist Party, DMKS, in 1985. In 1990, Zafirov officially became a member of the BSP and participated as an activist in the electoral campaigns of the decade.

In 2001, he served as a political advisor to the MP-candidate for Burgas from the BSP, Penka Kentardzhieva. He also participated in and was nominated for local elections by the civic movement "Sarafovo 21st-century", meant to represent a newly built neighborhood in Burgas. Ultimately, he did not end up contesting the 2003 Local Elections, however he was later appointed to serve in the Burgas Municipal Administration.

He was nominated as an MP candidate from Burgas Province by the BSP in the 2005 and 2009 national elections, as well as a candidate for the Burgas City Council in the 2007 Local Elections, however did not get elected.

In 2011, he was elected as the Oblast Coordinator of the BSP for Burgas.

=== Member of the National Assembly ===
In 2013, Zafirov was elected as an MP for the first time. He briefly retired from parliamentary activity following the 2017 Bulgarian parliamentary election, but was elected to serve in parliament once again in 2021.

In his parliamentary activity, Zafirov participated a number of commissions, most notably the Defense Commission in the 47th National Assembly. He further played an important role within the Armenian-Bulgarian friendship committee, receiving a medal from Armenian President Vahagn Khachaturyan for his contribution to Armenian-Bulgarian relations in 2022.

Internally, between 2021 and 2023, Zafirov was the deputy leader of the BSP parliamentary group.

He continued to be active within the party structures, being a member of both the National Council and the Executive Council of the BSP. In these roles, Zafirov generally expressed support for the leadership of Korneliya Ninova.

=== BSP Chairman ===
==== Acting Chairman ====
Following the poor results in the June 2024 Bulgarian parliamentary election, BSP chair Korneliya Ninova announced her intention to resign. In her announcement, Ninova indicated that an acting chairman would be chosen from the ranks of her deputies by the National Council until a new chairperson was elected.

Zafirov was elected as acting chairman of the BSP on 15 June 2024, with the support of 103 votes within the National Council. Zafirov's election led to speculation about the possibility of BSP's support for a GERB-led government, as he had previously indicated openness to the idea.

In media statements following his selection, Zafirov denied those rumours, stating that the BSP would not support a government including GERB or the DPS. Further, he criticised the actions of Korneliya Ninova, who he accused of attempting to sabotage the new leadership. Additionally, he promised major reforms within the party, including the restoration of previously expelled members, cooperation with leftist projects formed by dissident BSP members and a renewal of relations with President Rumen Radev.

Zafirov delivered the opening remarks for the BSP Parliamentary Group in the 50th National Assembly, in which he emphasised the BSP's ability to negotiate with all other political forces.

He also met with various internal party platforms in order to discuss the restoration of party unity. In these meetings, Zafirov promised to convene a National Council meeting in order to discuss the restoration of former BSP members.

Another key element of Zafirov's leadership program was enabling the consolidation of the Bulgarian left, in this goal he cited the example of the French New Popular Front. On 27 July, after a few weeks of negotiations and one day prior to the traditional BSP rally on Buzludzha, it was announced that an agreement had been reached between the BSP and a number of other leftist formations to contest future elections together. Zafirov hailed the signing of this joint agreement as a major victory for Bulgarian leftists.

During the parties traditional rally at Buzludzha, Zafirov delivered a speech emphasizing the need for internal unity and the consolidation of leftist voters. He further argued that reforms were needed within the party in order to achieve electoral success, and accused certain forces within the party of attempting to sabotage the new course.

On 10 August, Zafirov announced that the parties National Council had ratified the idea of contesting new parliamentary elections as part of a broad left-wing coalition. Additionally, he criticised the statements of Ninova and her allies within the party for attempting to undermine such a coalition. In media statements following the confirmation of the formation of a broad left-wing coalition, Zafirov made clear that former chairwoman Ninova would not be nominated as a candidate.

On 5 September, following negotiations about a joint-program, the composition and program of the coalition, the BSP - United Left was officially unveiled.

Prior to the registration of the coalition, court challenges were launched by Ninova and her allies claiming that Zafirov was not the legal representative of BSP, and hence could not register BSP for the October elections. In response, Zafirov motioned for the expulsion of Ninova and her allies on the National Council from the party, which passed. Commenting her expulsion, he argued that the decision sent a signal about the new leaderships resolve to undertake important changes within the party. On 9 September, the High Arbitration Court officially ruled that Zafirov, as acting chairman, was the sole legal representative of the BSP.

On 20 September, the new left-wing coalition announced its list leaders, with Zafirov being selected to lead the list for the 25th MMC-Sofia. After criticism of the published lists, Zafirov denied allegations that figures influenced by Delyan Peevski had been selected or that the lists had been imposed upon local party structures.

On 29 October, commenting the provisional final results which gave the BSP-led coalition around 7.8%, he underlined its ability to stop the electoral decline of the left in Bulgaria, highlighting that the coalition received 33,000 more votes compared to the previous election in June. Discussing the possibility of BSP's potential participation in government, he stated that BSP's main priority during negotiations was stable governance, although he further argued that traditionally right-wing parties already had a governing majority.

Prior to the convocation of the new National Assembly, Zafirov confirmed that the BSP - United Left group would nominate their own candidate for the speakership position. While reiterating that BSP were willing to negotiate with all parties in parliament, he made clear that he upheld the previous congress decision not to govern with either GERB or DPS.

Zafirov delivered the coalitions opening remarks in the opening session of the 51st National Assembly, wherein he focused on the need for parties to unite in order to tackle the challenges facing Bulgaria and underlined the BSP's pro-European positions, while emphasising the need to retain Bulgaria's sovereignty.

On 13 November, Zafirov participated in talks between the BSP and GERB, however denied that the talks concerned government formation and were instead focused on major policy issues facing the new parliament. He further participated in talks with PP-DB, during which he re-iterated BSP's previous refusal to sign a "cordon sanitaire" against DPS-Peevski, however indicated an openness to cooperate on other policy topics.

Commenting the inability of the National Assembly to elect a speaker, he proposed that all parliamentary groups present new nominations for speaker in order to find a consensus. Ultimately, the deadlock was resolved after MPs from the BSP-United Left parliamentary group signed the "cordon sanitaire" against Delyan Peevski, leading to the election of BSP nominated Nataliya Kiselova on 6 December.

On December 11, during consultations with the President, Zafirov confirmed that the BSP would participate in talks with GERB. He further elaborated that the BSP aimed to participate in the formation of an "above-partisan", "national" government with a clear program. Commenting previous BSP Congress decisions about not supporting a government formed with a GERB mandate, he stated that the format of the government would insure that the cabinet does not have a clearly political nature.

On 12 January, the National Council of the BSP voted to approve the parties participation in a coalition government with GERB and ITN, with Zafirov being nominated for the position of Deputy Prime Minister without portfolio. On 15 January, Zafirov confirmed that a coalition government led by Prime Minister Rosen Zhelyazkov, with external support from DPS-Dogan had been formed. On 16 January, Zafirov was sworn in as part of the Zhelyazkov Government. In this role, Zafirov was tasked with coordinating the work of the BSP ministers and oversaw the governments relationship with certain government agencies, including the agencies on nuclear energy, child protection, refugees and state archive. At a press conference in early February, Zafirov defended the parties choice to enter government by claiming that key BSP priorities had been included in the government's agenda, as well as the need for stability. He further characterised the government as being based on mutual compromises, and emphasised that the BSP would leave the government if their core principles were negated.

Zafirov was one of the candidates registered for the BSP leadership election. Opening his campaign in the BSP headquarters, Zafirov stated that he wished to modernise the party, restore a sense of collective leadership and increase support for local party structures. As his main accomplishments as acting leader, Zafirov noted the formation of a united left-wing coalition for the preceding election, as well as the parties entrance into government. As part of the National Council, Zafirov supported the amendment to the parties rule which returned the right to elect the chairperson of the party to the Congress, rather than directly. An amendment that was subsequently approved by the Congress on 15 February.

Speaking at the Congress, Zafirov criticised decisions made by previous chairwoman, Korneliya Ninova, specifically in terms of aligning with "non-systemic" protest parties, crediting these decisions with contributing to a loss of support by the BSP. He further stated his belief that continued participation in government, as well as measures to increase internal democracy would act to restore faith in the party among the electorate. Zafirov was elected as the new Chairman of the Bulgarian Socialist Party by the Congress, beating organisational secretary and minister of social affairs, Borislav Gutsanov, in the second round. In his victory speech, he promised to restore collective leadership within the party and respect internal democracy.

==== Chairman of the BSP & Deputy Prime Minister ====
As Deputy Prime Minister, Zafirov defended the budget presented by the Zhelyazkov Government, claiming that it defended social rights and ensured economic growth. He further praised the work of Prime Minister Rosen Zhelayzkov, who he qualified as professional. However, the BSP insisted on the preservation of planned pension increases according to the "Swiss rule", something which GERB opposed. Ultimately, after a conversation between Zafirov and Borisov it was agreed that a recalculation of pensions within the given budgetary frame would be conducted by the National Insurance Institute. In the end, the two parties agreed to a 5% pension increase for 2025, which was lower compared to the estimate according to the "Swiss rule".

On 9 March 2025, Zafirov unveiled his deputies within the party before the new composition of the National Council: Kaloyan Pargov, Ivan Takov, Ivan Ivanov and Ivan Peshev.

Following the confirmation that Velichie were set to enter the National Assembly following a court-ordered recalculation of the results, Zafirov confirmed that the BSP would continue to support the Zhelyazkov Government, even if it meant maintaining an unstable majority.

Speaking before the National Conference on the Prevention of Drug Abuse by Minors, Zafirov expressed the view that vapes should be banned in Bulgaria.

On 31 March, Zafirov proposed a motion to extend welfare support for Ukrainian refugees until 1 May 2025, which was approved by the cabinet.

On 15 April, Zafirov confirmed that the government had stopped the procedure for the sale of two reactors from the Belene nuclear power plant to Ukraine, a key priority for the BSP in the previous elections.

With the increasing informal support of DPS-NN for the incumbent government, Zafirov praised their decision, stating that they were one of the parties that demonstrated "political reason" in the current parliament.

After a referendum on the entrance of Bulgaria into the Eurozone in 2026 was proposed by President Rumen Radev on 9 May, Zafirov stated that the BSP opposed the referendum due to it being unconstitutional. He further argued that the Eurozone would not have any adverse social or economic impacts on Bulgaria, advocating for immediate membership in 2026. The decision was a significant change in the position of the BSP, who had previously been sceptical of Bulgaria's Eurozone membership under the leadership of Korneliya Ninova.

Speaking at the annual BSP rally on Mount Buzludzha on 2 August 2025, Zafirov praised the current government and stated that the BSP were an important element in the revival of Bulgarian statehood.

On 3 September, Zafirov attended the 2025 China Victory Day Parade meeting with Chinese leader Xi Jinping. His attendance led to questions about whether Zafirov was present at the event in his capacity as Deputy Prime Minister. The opposition coalition, PP-DB, called on Zafirov to resign due to the presence of controversial figures, such as Russian President Vladimir Putin at the parade. Further, Prime Minister Rosen Zhelyazkov stated that he was not aware of the visit. In response, Zafirov argued that his attendance was in his capacity as leader of the Bulgarian Socialist Party, having received the invitation prior to his role as a government minister. He further emphasised that he did not meet with either Putin, or General Secretary of the Workers' Party of Korea Kim Jong-Un, and that the nature of his meetings with other leaders was focused on furthering Bulgaria's economic development.

Zafirov was appointed as the chairman of the newly formed "National Board of Waters", an institution created in order to manage cases of acute water scarcity which effected at least 280,000 Bulgarians. After the first meeting of the board, Zafirov reported that 3.7 billion Leva were required in order to renovate antiquated water-related infrastructure in order to prevent future problems. In later statements to the media, Zafirov praised the work of the government, and specifically the Ministry of Regional Development, for halving the number of people effected by acute water scarcity within a 10-day period.

On 14 October, GERB leader, Boyko Borisov made a speech in which he criticised the work of BSP-nominated ministers, as well as chairwoman Nataliya Kiselova, threatening new elections if a government re-shuffle didn't take place. In an emergency press conference on 16 October, Zafirov defended the work of ministers from the BSP, while re-iterating that he was open to making government changes in the interests of stability, provided they were a result of negotiations. During a meeting of the Council of Common Governance, it was decided that the composition of the current cabinet would remain unchanged, however GERB and ITN formally requested the resignation of Nataliya Kiselova. On 26 October, Zafirov confirmed that the BSP had agreed to her resignation, provided that the rotational principle was embedded in the coalition agreement and that the political priorities of the current government were reviewed.

Zafirov was a strong proponent of the 2026 state budget proposed by the Zhelyazkov government, calling it the "most left-wing budget in decades". After the government announced a review of the 2026 budget in response to large-scale protests, Zafirov confirmed that the party would "review" its participation in government if their key policies were excluded. On 2 December, after a new mass protest was held in Sofia, the government withdrew the budget for 2026 in order to rework it. Zafirov defended the governments decision and stated that the review of the budget could give an opportunity for the incorporation of other BSP proposoals.

Despite government concessions, large scale protests against the government continued in Sofia and across Bulgaria. On 12 December, the Zhelyazkov government resigned. In a press briefing after the resignation, Zafirov justified the BSP's participation in government as being necessary to restore stability, and promised to undertake a comprehensive review of the actions of the BSP in government. The BSP further insisted that the budget for 2026 be approved by the parliament, in order to ensure fiscal stability.

==== Post-Zhelyazkov BSP leader ====
Shortly after the resignation of the Zhelyazkov government, calls for the resignation of Atanas Zafirov and other members of the BSP leadership were issued by a number of regional branches of the BSP, along with current MPs. On 17 December, the entire Executive Bureau of the BSP resigned, however it reportedly rejected the resignation of Atanas Zafirov. In an interview on 20 December, Zafirov rejected the possibility of his resignation and argued that calls for an emergency congress prior to upcoming elections would destabilise the party.

During the plenum of the BSP National Council on 10 January 2026, Zafirov presented a report on the parties activity in government, which he categorised as largely positive. Despite objections by Zafirov and his supporters, the National Council voted to hold an extraordinary congress of the party in early February.

On 29 January, Zafirov announced that he would not seek re-election as an MP, but confirmed that he had no intention to resign as the party's chairman.

At the opening of the extra-ordinary BSP congress on 7 February, Zafirov confirmed his intention to resign as party chairman to prevent a factional struggle within the party. He confirmed that his resignation didn't mean a withdrawal from politics, and promised to support the BSP in the upcoming election campaign.

=== Post-Chairmanship career ===
On February 11, 2026, Zafirov returned to the National Assembly after the transfer of power from the Zhelyazkov government to the Gyurov Government. Zafirov was one of 8 BSP MPs who voted in favour of overturning the veto imposed by President Iliana Yotova against the law which amended the electoral code to limit the number of electoral sections opened outside the European Union. In the votes aftermath, party leader Krum Zarkov announced that none of the 8 MPs would be re-nominated, as they had defied a decision by the National Council in favour of supporting the President's veto.

Party political offices
Preceded by Korneliya Ninova	Leader of the Socialist Party; 2024	Incumbent
