= Ahmed Dogan =

Bulgarian politician and oligarch (born 1954)

- Ахмед Доган
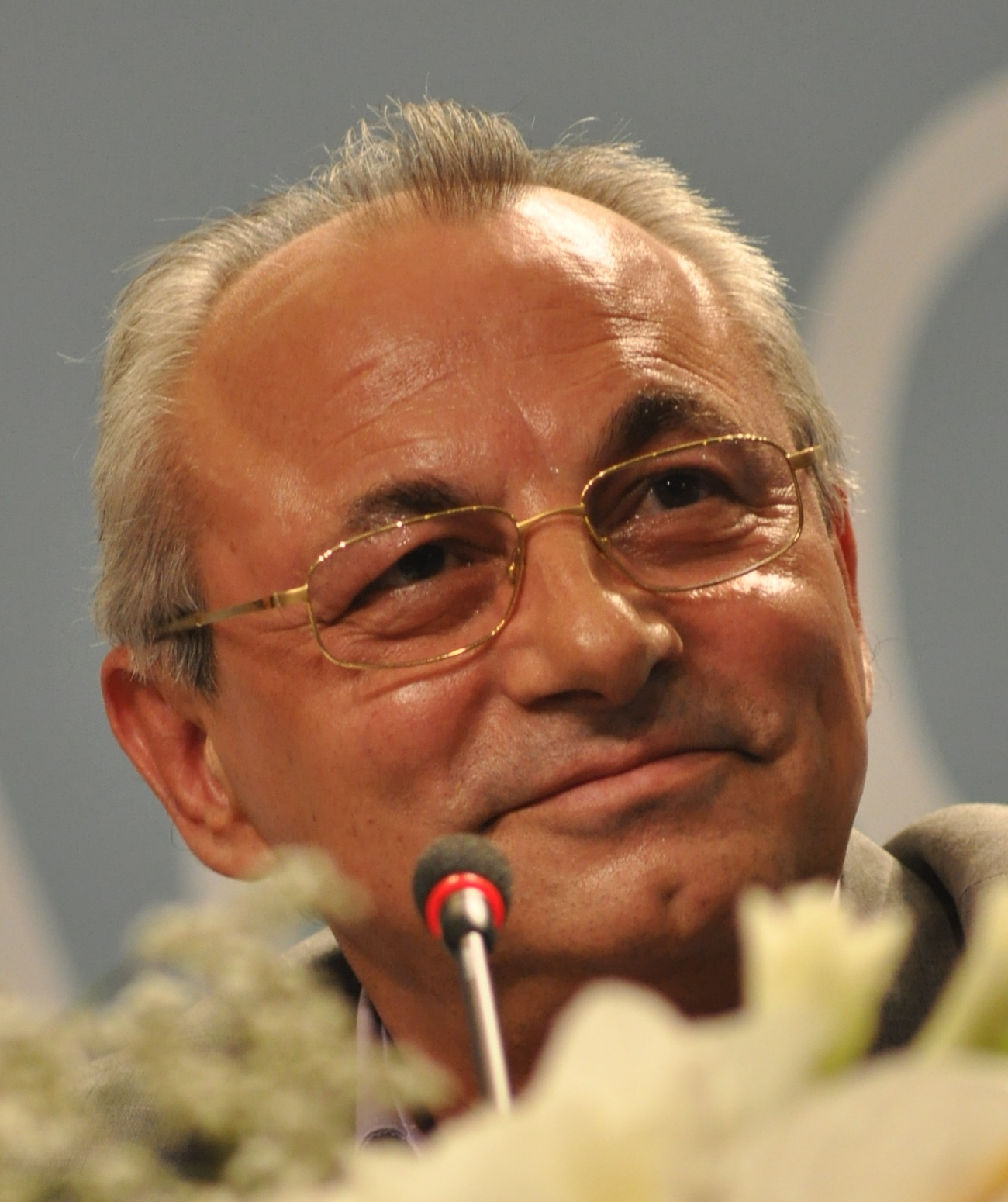
- Dogan in 2009

Member of the National Assembly
- In office 4 November 1991 – 14 March 2013
- Constituency: 9th MMC - Kardzhali

Member of the 7th Grand National Assembly
- In office 10 July 1990 – 2 October 1991
- Preceded by: Position established
- Succeeded by: Position abolished

Leader of the Movement for Rights and Freedoms
- In office 4 January 1990 – 19 January 2013
- Preceded by: Position established
- Succeeded by: Lyutvi Mestan

Personal details
- Born: Ahmed Ismailov Ahmedov; 29 March 1954 (age 72) Pchelarovo, PR Bulgaria
- Party: APS (2024–present); DPS (until 2025)
- Spouse: Shirin Karnobatla (m. 1995; div. 2002)
- Education: Sofia University
- Occupation: Politician; philosopher

Ahmed Demir Dogan (Bulgarian: Ахмед Демир Доган; (Note: Turkish: Ahmed Demir Doğan) born 29 March 1954) is a Turkish Bulgarian oligarch and politician who founded the DPS party in 1990 and remained its leader until he stepped down in 2013, from which point he continued to be its honorary chairman until 2025.

== Life and career ==
Dogan was born in Pchelarovo to Demire Dogan from Drandar and an unknown father from Pchelarovo, Dobrich Province. In 1981 he completed his studies in philosophy at Sofia University and in 1986 earned the then equivalent of a doctoral degree after completing a dissertation on the theme of "Philosophical analysis of the principle of symmetry". He is the founder of the Movement for Rights and Freedoms (DPS), a liberal party that claims to represent the interests of the Turkish minority in Bulgaria.

In September 2007, Dogan's name was listed on an official report of communist-era secret police collaborators. According to the report, Dogan was a paid agent of the Committee for State Security from August 1974 until March 1988.

In October 2010, the Supreme Administrative Court (SAC) in Sofia acquitted Dogan of corruption in a case brought by the Parliamentary Commission regarding consulting fees paid in 2008 and 2009 in respect of hydro-power projects.

== 2013 attack ==
On 19 January 2013, as Dogan addressed a large audience from a podium, Oktay Enimehmedov ran onto the stage. Enimehmedov, a Bulgarian national of Turkish descent, pointed a gas pistol within 30 centimetres (12 in) of Dogan's head, but did not discharge the firearm. It was reported that the gun contained blank cartridges, and that one of the cartridges contained pepper spray. Had the gun been fired, it would have caused non-lethal injuries. Dogan grappled with Enimehmedov, who was then tackled and wrestled to the ground by security guards and delegates. He was beaten and kicked for several minutes before being arrested.

In February 2014, Enimehmedov received a sentence of three-and-a-half years' imprisonment.

== Battle over the DPS ==
In 2024, there was a legal battle between the two co-chairmen of DPS, Delyan Peevski and Dzhevdet Chakarov, the latter of which Dogan aligned with. In the run-up to the October 2024 parliamentary election, the party split into DPS – New Beginning (led by Peevski) and the Alliance for Rights and Freedoms (led by Chakarov). At the time, the courts ruled that Peevski had submitted registration first, and as such the original DPS ran under Peevski's electoral coalition.

In July 2025, the Sofia City Court ruled that Peevski was the one sole chairman of DPS, and that Dogan was officially removed from the party.

== Bibliography ==
- Lilov, Grigor (2013). Най-богатите българи (1st ed.). Sofia: „Кайлас” ЕООД. ISBN 978-954-92098-9-1.
