= Tsekov =

Tsekov is a surname. Notable people with the surname include:

- Andrey Tsekov (born 1973), Bulgarian politician
- Borislav Tsekov (born 1972), Bulgarian politician and lawyer
- Sergei Tsekov (born 1953), Russian and Ukrainian politician
