= Hayri Sadakov =

Bulgarian politician (born 1970)

- Хайри Садъков
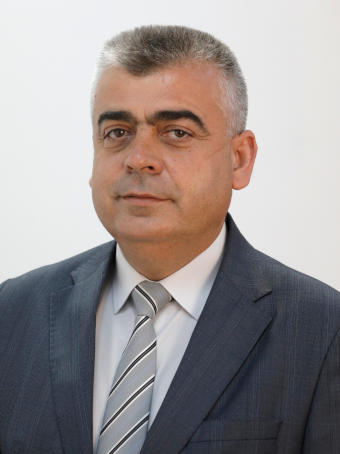
- Sadakov in 2021

Chairman of the Alliance for Rights and Freedoms
- Incumbent
- Assumed office 28 May 2025

Member of the National Assembly
- Incumbent
- Assumed office 19 April 2017
- Constituency: Smolyan

Personal details
- Born: 18 December 1970 (age 55) Zlataritsa, Bulgaria
- Party: Alliance for Rights and Freedoms (since 2024)
- Other political affiliations: Movement for Rights and Freedoms

Hayri Redzhebov Sadakov (Bulgarian: Хайри Реджебов Садъков; born 18 December 1970) is a Bulgarian politician. Initially elected in 2017 as a member of the Movement for Rights and Freedoms, he later became a member of the National Assembly for the Alliance for Rights and Freedoms (APS) group. He served as a deputy chairman of the National Assembly since 2024.

In May 2025, Sadakov was chosen as the chairman of the APS.
