= Velichie =

Greatness Величие
- Leader: Ivelin Mihaylov
- Chairwoman: Albena Pekova
- Founder: Ivelin Mihaylov
- Founded: 25 July 2023
- Headquarters: Starata Banya building, Vitosha street, Vetrino, Vetrino Municipality, Varna Province
- Paramilitary wing: Bulgarski Yunak (alleged)
- Ideology: Bulgarian nationalism Populism
- Political position: Far-right
- Colors: Red
- Slogan: От пепелта към слънцето! ('From the ashes to the sun!')
- National Assembly: 0 / 240
- European Parliament: 0 / 17

Website
- velichie.bg

Velichie (Bulgarian: Величие, lit. 'Greatness') is a Bulgarian political party founded in 2023, with strong connections to the Bulgarian businessman Ivelin Mihaylov. The party has a strong position in Vetrino Municipality and received parliamentary representation following the June 2024 Bulgarian parliamentary election.

Following the October snap election, the party won 3.999% of the vote, falling short by 21 votes of the 4% threshold required to gain representation in the 51st National Assembly. However, after the Constitutional Court ruled that Velichie passed the threshold following a recount, the party gained 10 seats in parliament.

== History ==
=== Origin ===
The Velichie party was founded in summer 2023 in Vetrino Municipality. It has been reported that the founder was Ivelin Mihaylov. In an interview with Radio Free Europe, Mihaylov recounted that the party was founded by Vetrino locals in response to plans to build a wind energy production site in the municipality.

The party contested the 2023 Bulgarian local elections, in which it gained 40.51% of the votes in Vetrino.

=== Nikolay Markov ===
In 2024, the party began an association with Nikolay Markov, who was often called the party's leader, although not legally holding the position. Markov, a National Guard Service veteran, earned the nickname "the Colonel" in media reports. He left the service in 2007 after a scandal with then-president Georgi Parvanov, whom he accused of abusing power. Since then, Markov has appeared in some media as an expert on national security and counterterrorism.

=== June 2024 elections ===
In April 2024, Markov announced that the party would participate in the snap parliamentary election and in the European Parliament election. The party's regional list leader in Sofia was Viktoria Vassileva, a former member of the National Assembly from Union of Democratic Forces and There is Such a People.

Despite not appearing in most opinion polls, the Velichie party passed the 4% electoral threshold for the parliamentary election and gained 13 seats in the National Assembly. On election day, the party leadership suggested that the vote had been rigged against the party. Additionally, they attacked sociological agencies for what they perceived to be an intentional omission of the party from opinion polls. The party failed to win representation in the European election on the same day, receiving 4% of the vote.

=== Parliamentary activity ===
The Velichie party had 13 seats at the start of the 50th National Assembly, with Nikolay Markov being selected as the chair of the parliamentary group.

Prior to the convention of the National Assembly, Markov did not deny the possibility of Velichie negotiating with GERB; however, he clarified that they would only negotiate with GERB leader Boyko Borisov. Ultimately, the party did not attend the meeting organised by the GERB negotiation team on 18 June.

During the first session of the National Assembly, the Velichie parliamentary group nominated its own candidates for the position of Speaker, although both candidacies failed to gather support outside of the grouping. During the first session, Markov, the chief of the parliamentary group, arrived late; it was later alleged by Velichie MP Darin Georgiev that the reason for Markov's lateness was due to alleged attempts at blackmail by GERB. Markov, in the days following, seemed to confirm the allegations, stating that a contact group representing "three political parties" had threatened to release an audio tape implicating himself and the party's founder, Ivelin Mihaylov, if Velichie did not give political support to GERB.

On 21 June, during a vote for who should chair the commission responsible for preparing the rulebook, the Velichie group voted together with GERB and DPS, thus assuring a majority for the GERB nominee, Anna Aleksandrova. In the aftermath of this vote, the party's founder, Ivelin Mihaylov, alleged that there was a possibility of a division within the parliamentary group, with 5–6 MPs potentially being aligned with GERB. Mihaylov's comments provoked an angry reaction from the leader of the parliamentary group, Markov, who accused him of undermining his authority and harming the reputation of the party. Mihaylov backed down from his comment following Markov's statement, apologised to the MPs, and emphasised his confidence in their abilities.

On 26 June, the party's representatives attended consultations with President Radev, during which they made clear their support for a government based on a clear programme, and stated that they would not support a GERB-led government due to a lack of communication from the largest party.

On 1 July, shortly after the nomination of Rosen Zhelyazkov as GERB's PM candidate, a message was published on the social media platform X from the account of Ivelin Mihaylov calling on Velichie MPs to vote in favour of the proposed government. In a Facebook post, he clarified that his account on X was hacked and that his position that Velichie should vote against a government proposed by GERB had not changed.

Later that day, Mihaylov published a series of claims on Facebook alleging that Nikolay Markov and a group of MPs aligned with him (specifically Viktoria Vasileva) had threatened him and planned to vote in favour of the proposed GERB cabinet. On 2 July, he published an address to Velichie supporters in which he expanded on his allegations against Markov, claiming that Markov had reached a deal with GERB and had attempted to sideline Mihaylov within the party, even promising to alleviate legal pressure against him in exchange for his political disengagement. The address was joined by Velichie MP Krasimira Kantincharova, who supported Mihaylov's claims that Markov and Vasileva had attempted to assert control over the party's parliamentary group for their own personal ends.

On 3 July, Markov made a Facebook post in which he officially disassociated himself from the party, and further claimed that it was a political vehicle for Mihaylov's economic interests.

Despite the allegations brought forth by Mihaylov, the entirety of the Velichie parliamentary group was present and voted against the nomination of Rosen Zhelyazkov for PM.

Speaking to the party's supporters in Razgrad shortly after the vote, Mihaylov informed them that a vote was scheduled for 4 July to expel Markov and Vasileva from the parliamentary group. Additionally, he continued his prior accusations against Markov, for instance accusing him of threatening five female MPs within the group. After Mihaylov's statement, the Central Council of Velichie formally requested that Markov and Vasileva leave the parliamentary group of the party.

In a statement to the media on 4 July, Markov claimed that the rift between him and Mihaylov had originated due to Mihaylov's insistence that the Velichie group cooperate with Revival. He further underlined Mihaylov's undue influence within the party, considering he was not part of the leadership. Ultimately, however, Markov indicated that he was open to leaving the parliamentary group, due to the presence of MPs within it who he alleged were controlled by Mihaylov through financial coercion.

On 5 July, six MPs from the Velichie parliamentary group officially announced their intention to leave it, thus dissolving the group. The MPs, in a briefing to the press, justified their decision by citing a loss of confidence in the parliamentary group's leadership. Specifically, the MPs cited a lack of communication from Markov about key topics, such as the party's stance in government negotiations, as well as Markov's social media statements in which he officially disavowed the party. The MPs claimed that they had attempted to remove the current leadership; however, their efforts proved unsuccessful due to obstruction by the leadership.

Markov claimed that the group of MPs who had left were financially beholden to Mihaylov. He also claimed that Mihaylov had attempted to intimidate Velichie MPs, recounting that he had locked a group of MPs in his barn and demanded they vote in favour of certain laws. Another Velichie MP, Darin Georgiev, corroborated Markov's allegation that Mihaylov had locked a group of Velichie MPs in his barn against their will. He further stated that the dissolution of the group meant the end of the political party, although he did not exclude future political cooperation with those MPs who had "not betrayed the ideals of Velichie".

Despite Georgiev's claim, Mihaylov announced that Velichie would continue its political activity and contest future elections, although with new MP candidates.

=== October 2024 parliamentary election ===
Velichie ran alone in the October 2024 Bulgarian parliamentary election. It opened its electoral campaign in the town of Troyan, with founder Ivelin Mihaylov claiming that Velichie's programme would be focused on creating a long-term plan for Bulgaria's development.

During the campaign period, the party office of Velichie in Varna was set on fire by unknown assailants. In a video on Facebook, party founder and candidate Ivelin Mihaylov implied that the assailants might be connected to GERB and may have done it due to Mihaylov's revelation of alleged vote-buying schemes in Varna.

Following the publication of the provisional final results from the electoral commission, Velichie was shown as being just below the 4% threshold to enter parliament, receiving 3.999%. In a number of publications on the party's Facebook page and by party candidates, it was implied that the percentage received by Velichie was intentionally lowered by the Central Electoral Commission, under pressure from external actors, in order to prevent Velichie from entering parliament.

In an address on the party-affiliated news channel Free Voice, Ivelin Mihaylov claimed that the election had been "stolen", both due to alleged mass vote buying and manipulations of the voting process at the local level. However, he discounted the possibility of organising mass protests or other civil actions to contest the result. Instead, he called on Velichie supporters to actively join the party, build up its local structures, and create a parallel governance structure in order to demonstrate the success of Velichie's approach in lieu of the next election.

On 29 October, Mihaylov published a new address on his Facebook page, in which he announced that Velichie intended to organise a protest campaign to call for the annulment of the October elections due to alleged large-scale irregularities. He specifically called for a protest in the government quarter of Sofia on the evening of 31 October. Besides protests, he stated that Velichie intended to legally challenge the election results and seek support from European and international institutions.

Shortly before the protest took place, the CEC officially confirmed that Velichie had not crossed the 4% threshold.

In a press briefing on 1 November, Velichie announced that they did not recognize the finalised election results and called for new elections to be held immediately. At these new elections, Velichie promised to gather at least 13,000 observers to "prevent voter manipulation".

Velichie organised a protest outside the National Assembly prior to the opening session in order to call for the annulment of the elections.

On 28 November, the Velichie-affiliated NGO "Patriots for Bulgaria" filed for the registration of the party-run YouTube channel "Free Voice" as an official TV channel.

Prior to the publishing of the results of the recalculation of the vote following a court-ordered recount of the elections in March 2025, Ivelin Mihaylov claimed that the recount had established that Velichie was set to enter parliament, as it passed the 4% threshold. On 11 March, Velichie organised a protest outside the house of former Prime Minister and GERB leader Boyko Borisov.

Following the confirmation that Velichie did indeed pass the threshold, Velichie was allocated ten seats within the National Assembly, thus forming a parliamentary group.

Velichie endorsed the referendum proposed by President Rumen Radev about Bulgaria's accession to the Eurozone in 2026. The party further endorsed Revival-organised protests in support of the referendum.

Velichie have participated in and organised protests during the 2025 Bulgarian protests. Supporters of the party organised а protest in favour of the governments resignation outside the parliament building on 28 November, blocking traffic in central Sofia due to the intentional breakdown of their cars. On 4 December, the party organised a protest in support of employees working at the Mihaylov-affiliated "Historical Park", who had been detained as part of a law enforcement probe into allegations of money laundering. Additionally, supporters of Velichie placed a satirical painting titled "the Bulgarian Mafia" outside the residence of former Prime Minister and GERB leader, Boyko Borisov in Bankya.

=== April 2026 parliamentary election & Aftermath ===
Velichie contested the snap legislative elections, held on April 19, 2026. The party finished below the threshold, receiving 3% of the vote, although it qualified for state funding by finishing above 1%. Velichie's parliamentary group chairman, Ivelin Mihaylov, confirmed that the party recognised the election results and warned the incoming government against carrying out repressions against Velichie members. He further announced that he would withdraw from active politics, although he confirmed that Velichie would continue to contest future elections and actively participate in the countries politics.

== Ideology ==
According to Nikolay Markov, the main goals of the party are to promote Bulgarian investments in the country, accelerate the completion of the Belene Nuclear Power Plant, and bring the fight against organized crime in the country to the European level. Markov also pointed out the prevention of Bulgaria's participation in the Russo-Ukrainian War, suspending the legal possibilities of such military intervention.

Bulgarian media calls Velichie a Russophile and anti-Western party, competing with Revival in this field. Velichie has denied claims of being pro-Russian or of being opposed to Bulgaria's membership in NATO and the EU.

== Controversies ==
=== Allegations of connections with a paramilitary organisation ===
Some media outlets have alleged that Velichie has its own paramilitary organisation, called "Bulgarski Yunak" (lit. 'Bulgarian Hero'), which is registered as a sports club. The organisation provides military training including "urban survival" and "building capture and retreat with covering fire". However, party figures have denied this allegation.

=== Allegations of electing illegitimate MPs ===
On 30 October 2025, Radostin Vassilev, leader of the parliamentary party MECh, alleged that one of the MPs elected from the Velichie list had not signed the necessary declaration confirming her will to become a member of parliament, with the document instead being signed by another MP, Stiliyana Bobcheva. He cited a signal sent by the civic organisation "Bulgarian anti-mafia league", as well as a review conducted by lawyers associated with MECh. Subsequently, Radostin Vassilev called on Mariya Ilieva to resign. On 12 November, Radostin Vassilev played a 4-minute audio recording in the National Assembly which was an extract of a telephone conversation between Velichie MP Stiliyana Bobcheva and a member of the civic organisation "Bulgarian Anti-Mafia League", Grigor Zdravkov. He alleged that the recording depicted Stiliyana Bobcheva as being complicit in the forgery of documents related to the election of MPs. Vassilev further claimed that the extract was part of a 40 minute long recording, which had been deposited to the general prosecutors office, and called for law enforcement intervention.

Mariya Ilieva, as well as politicians affiliated with Velichie, have denied the claims raised by Vassilev. After the publication of the allegations, parliamentary group chairman, Ivelin Mihaylov, publicly defended the MP. On 13 November, Ilieva denounced Vassilev's accusations and re-affirmed that all documents had been signed by her.

== Election results ==
=== National Assembly ===
Election	Leader	Votes	%	Seats	+/–	Status
Jun 2024	Albena Pekova	99,862	4.52 (#7)	13 / 240	New	Snap election
Oct 2024	Albena Pekova	97,438	3.87 (#8)	10 / 240	▼3	Opposition
2026	Albena Pekova	100,572	3.06 (#7)	0 / 240	▼10	Extra-parliamentary

=== European Parliament ===
Election	List leader	Votes	%	Seats	+/–	EP Group
2024	Nikolay Markov	81,955	4.07 (#7)	0 / 17	New	–

=== President ===
Election	Candidate	First round			Second round		
Election	Candidate	Votes	%	Rank	Votes	%	Result
2026	Ivelin Mihaylov	57,643	3.79	5th	—N/a		Lost
