= DPS – New Beginning =

Bulgarian in galti electoral coalition

Movement for Rights and Freedoms – New Beginning Движение за права и свободи – Ново начало
- Abbreviation: DPS–NN
- Chairperson: Delyan Peevski
- Founded: 2 September 2024
- Dissolved: 2 March 2026
- Ideology: Liberalism; Turkish minority interests
- Political position: Centre
- European affiliation: European Conservatives, Patriots & Affiliates
- European Parliament group: Renew Europe (2024); Non-Inscrits (2024–2026)
- Colors: Blue
- National Assembly: 29 / 240
- European Parliament: 2 / 17

Website
- dpsbg.eu / www.dps.bg (Note: The Alliance for Rights and Freedoms initially had control of this website, but following the legal success of DPS–NN, they took over the website.)

Movement for Rights and Freedoms – New Beginning (Bulgarian: Движение за права и свободи – Ново начало; ДПС-НН, romanized: Dvizhenie za prava i svobodi – Novo nachalo, DPS–NN), also referred to as DPS–Peevski, was a Bulgarian electoral alliance, led by DPS and its chairman, media mogul and oligarch Delyan Peevski.

== History ==
=== Formation ===
The coalition was set up in response to the removal of Peevski as co-leader of the DPS, ahead of the October 2024 Bulgarian parliamentary election. Its registration was submitted electronically early in the morning on 2 September, in order to be approved before the Alliance for Rights and Freedoms, the competing DPS faction. This move was unprecedented, and the electoral commission decided to allow both electoral coalitions to run with the same abbreviation. On 11 September, the SAC ruled that DPS was part of DPS-NN, because their registration had been submitted first. Peevski's removal from party leadership was later overturned by the Sofia City Court.

=== Consolidation ===
Following the split in the DPS, its elected mayors split roughly evenly between Peevski and Dogan's factions. In April 2025, Peevski launched a campaign to attract elected mayors to join his faction, targeting municipalities which had remained loyal to Dogan. According to research by Deutsche Welle, by 1 May 2025, DPS-NN had 34 mayors. By 17 June, all mayors in the Kardzhali Province were aligned with DPS–NN.

=== Dissolution ===
In early 2026, DPS under the leadership of Peevski registered on their own ahead of the upcoming election.

== Composition ==
Despite the original DPS being listed as part of both electoral coalitions, the Commission decided on 4 September that both had to prove the original party was not part of either group, something neither wing agreed to do by the 7 September deadline. Because it was technically registered first online, the Supreme Administrative Court of Bulgaria accepted the application filed by DPS–Peevski and as such the official DPS was part of DPS–Peevski. The composition of DPS–Peevski at the October 2024 election was as follows:

| Party | Leader | Ideology |
|---|---|---|
| Movement for Rights and Freedoms (DPS) | Delyan Peevski | Liberalism; Turkish minority interests |
| Bulgarian Voice (BG) (Note: The party first ran nationally in the June 2024 elections, supporting breakaway figures from Revival, but failed to win any seats.) | Georgi Zacharinin Popov | National conservatism Euro-Atlanticism |
| New Leaders (Note: The party has locally been in the United for Plovdiv coalition of former mayor Georgi Tityukov.) | Ivanka Miteva | Direct democracy Local politics of Plovdiv |

== Election results ==
=== National Assembly ===
| Election | Leader | Votes | % | Seats | +/– | Government |
|---|---|---|---|---|---|---|
| Oct 2024 | Delyan Peevski | 281,356 | 11.17 (#4) | 29 / 240 | New | Opposition (Jan-Mar 2025) |
| Oct 2024 | Delyan Peevski | 281,356 | 11.17 (#4) | 29 / 240 | New | Support (Mar 2025-Feb 2026) (Note: The party did not officially support the government, but is considered to be the party that gives the government a de facto majority.) |

== See also ==
- Alliance for Rights and Freedoms
