= Morality, Unity, Honour =

Far-right political party in Bulgaria

Morality, Unity, Honour Морал, Единство, Чест
- Abbreviation: MECh
- Leader: Radostin Vasilev
- Founder: Radostin Vasilev
- Founded: 9 February 2024; 2 years ago
- Split from: We Continue the Change
- Headquarters: 47 General Parensov St., Sofia
- Ideology: Bulgarian nationalism Right-wing populism Social conservatism Euroscepticism
- Political position: Far-right
- Colors: Red; Navy blue
- Slogan: България първо! ('Bulgaria first!')
- National Assembly: 0 / 240
- European Parliament: 0 / 17

Website
- ppmech.bg

Morality, Unity, Honour (Bulgarian: Морал, Единство, Чест, romanized: Moral, Edinstvo, Chest), also known simply as MECh (Bulgarian: МЕЧ, lit. 'Sword') is a far-right Bulgarian political party formed in February 2024 by former Minister of Youth and Sports and then-MP Radostin Vasilev. The party stands on a hard anti-establishment and anti-corruption platform, promising to fight organised crime and restore the rule of law in the country. It also advocates for traditional family values, while opposing the LGBT community, a Eurosceptic approach to Bulgaria's membership in the European Union, and has been accused of being pro-Russian.

== History ==
=== Background and foundation ===
Morality, Unity, Honour was officially registered as a political party on 9 February 2024, after its founder, Radostin Vasilev, launched its platform in the fall of 2023. Vasilev, formerly a member of the ITN and We Continue the Change parties, had left the latter in May 2023 following a wiretapping scandal involving him. On 21 May the party held a national video conference with about 50 people participating where it discussed the opportunity of forming a government in a coalition with GERB–SDS. As the conference was running late at night, Vasilev proceeded to record it and, in his words, go to bed. The following day he leaked the recording to the press, claiming he has lost confidence in party leaders Kiril Petkov and Assen Vassilev, who, unaware of being recorded, can be heard making controversial statements on multiple occasions in the tape. While the scandal stalled government talks, they concluded in the formation of the Denkov Government. As a result, Vasilev declared his independence from the PP-DB group in the National Assembly and served as MP until the dissolution of the 49th National Assembly, where he would actively criticize the government and use his position to increase the popularity of his newly formed party.

=== 2024 October elections & entrance into parliament ===
Following the October 2024 Bulgarian parliamentary election, MECh entered the Bulgarian National Assembly. Following the parties election result, the parties founder and leader, Radostin Vasilev, called for the formation of an “anti-GERB and DPS” majority within the parliament, in order to pass anti-corruption legislation. He further lamented that MECh's main demand if such a majority was formed was that the Minister of Interior be selected from MECh, with Vasilev presenting himself as a potential candidate.

MECh were one of the few parties in the Bulgarian parliament that openly called for the full annulment of the results of the October parliamentary elections.

It initially cooperated with Velichie and Revival in the 51st National Assembly of Bulgaria as opposition.

== Election results ==
=== National Assembly ===
Election	Leader	Votes	%	Seats	+/–	Government
Jun 2024	Radostin Vasilev	63,992	2.89 (#8)	0 / 240	New	Extra-parliamentary
Oct 2024	Radostin Vasilev	111,965	4.44 (#8)	11 / 240	▲11	Opposition
2026	Radostin Vasilev	104,506	3.18 (#6)	0 / 240	▼11	Extra-parliamentary

=== European Parliament ===
Election	List leader	Votes	%	Seats	+/–	EP Group
2024	Radostin Vasilev	51,076	2.54 (#8)	0 / 17	New	–

=== President ===
Election	Candidate	First round			Second round		
Election	Candidate	Votes	%	Rank	Votes	%	Result
2026	Radostin Vasilev	70,127	4.61	4th	—N/a		Lost
