= Alliance for Rights and Freedoms =

Bulgarian electoral coalition

Alliance for Rights and Freedoms Алианс за права и свободи
- Abbreviation: APS
- Parliamentary leader: Hayri Sadakov
- Honorary Chairman: Ahmed Dogan
- Chairmen: Taner Ali; Dimitar Nikolov; Sevim Ali; Hayri Sadukov
- Founders: Ahmed Dogan; Dzhevdet Chakarov
- Founded: 2 September 2024, 1 year ago
- Registered: 11 September 2024, 1 year ago
- Split from: Movement for Rights and Freedoms
- Ideology: Liberalism; Turkish minority interests
- Political position: Centre
- European Parliament group: Renew Europe
- Colors: Blue (official); Purple (customary)
- National Assembly: 0 / 240
- European Parliament: 1 / 17

Website
- alians.bg

The Alliance for Rights and Freedoms (Bulgarian: Алианс за права и свободи, АПС, romanized: Alians za prava i svobodi, APS; Turkish: Hak ve Özgürlükler İttifakı) formerly DPS–Dogan, DPS–DPS (Note: The coalition was also known as Democracy, Rights and Freedoms (DPS, or DPS–DPS), after the name of its parliamentary group in the Bulgarian national assembly, until use of the DPS acronym was disallowed in June 2025.) or the Doganists, is a Bulgarian political party and formerly an electoral alliance. It predominantly consists of former members of the DPS, including its founder Ahmed Dogan.

== History ==
=== As a coalition ===
The electoral coalition was formed following a rift between two factions in the DPS, led by its co-chairmen Dzhevdet Chakarov and Delyan Peevski. On 27 August 2024, the Central Committee of the party, closely linked to party founder and honorary chairman Ahmed Dogan, expelled Peevski and several of his allies. Peevski disputed this and both factions submitted registrations to participate in the October 2024 election. On 11 September, the SAC ruled that the unprecedented electronic application of DPS–Peevski was valid, because it had been submitted first. Afterwards DPS–Dogan changed their name and removed DPS from the registration of their coalition.

The Alliance for Rights and Freedoms coalition achieved 6th place and 19 seats in the October 2024 election and formed a parliamentary group named DPS - Democracy, Rights and Freedoms or DPS-DPS. In June 2025, the speaker of the National Assembly, Nataliya Kiselova, put forward proposals to strip the group of the name, due to its alleged conflict with electoral law, which were approved by the National Assembly. Although the group refused to comply, the name change from DPS–DPS to APS was enforced.

During the formation of the Zhelyazkov Government, the coalition agreed to provide external support. In early March 2025, the group announced that they believed the government had been working with DPS–Peevski and suggested they could withdraw their support for it, which they did later that month.

Peevski had challenged his expulsion from the party and removal as co-leader, arguing that it had been unconstitutional. In December 2024 and February 2025 the Sofia City Court ruled in his favour, affirming his leadership of the original DPS. In May, following legal pressure, Chakarov withdrew his claim to the leadership and announced he would be leaving the APS group. Over the following months, three further MPs also left the group. The remaining MPs selected Hayri Sadakov to succeed Chakarov as chairman of the group.

=== As a party ===
In late May 2025 Dogan and his supporters expressed interest in creating a new party, possibly named "Movement for Unity and Justice". On 22 July, Dogan announced the beginning of a three month transition period to a new political project, stating that the original DPS had been 'hijacked' by Peevski.

On 11 September Dogan announced that the Alliance for Rights and Freedoms would transform into a political party. Its founding congress was held on 15 November, Ahmed Dogan was elected honorary chairman and Hayri Sadakov, Taner Ali, Sevim Ali and Dimitar Nikolov were elected co-chairmen. The party submitted its registration on 9 January 2026. The party registered for the 2026 election as part of a coalition of the same name.

== National affiliation ==
Ahead of the October 2024 election, the Charakov-led Dogan faction of the DPS, initially registered as "Democracy, Rights and Freedoms - DPS", which included DPS. Following the decision not to approve the coalition, they registered as "Alliance for Rights and Freedoms" with the same composition, but with DPS excluded:

Party	Leader	Ideology
Just Bulgaria United Patriots (SBOR) (Note: Formerly part of the Together electoral coalition in 2023.)	Dimitar Iliev	
Agrarian People's Union (ZNS) (Note: Formerly part of various electoral coalitions, most recently Blue Bulgaria for the June 2024 elections.)	Rumen Yonchev	Agrarianism

Ahead of the 2026 election, APS registered as part of a coalition with the same name:

Party	Leader	Ideology
Alliance for Rights and Freedoms	Hayri Sadakov	Liberalism; Turkish minority interests
Agrarian People's Union (ZNS)	Rumen Yonchev	Agrarianism

== Election results ==
=== National Assembly ===
Election	Leader	Votes	%	Seats	+/–	Government
Oct 2024	Dzhevdet Chakarov	182,253	7.23 (#6)	19 / 240	New	Support (Jan–Mar 2025)
Oct 2024	Dzhevdet Chakarov	182,253	7.23 (#6)	19 / 240	New	Opposition (Mar 2025-2026)
2026	Hayri Sadakov	50,759	1.54 (#10)	0 / 240	▼19	Extra-parliamentary

== See also ==
- Movement for Rights and Freedoms
- DPS – A New Beginning
