= Silvi Kirilov =

Bulgarian doctor and politician

- Силви Кирилов
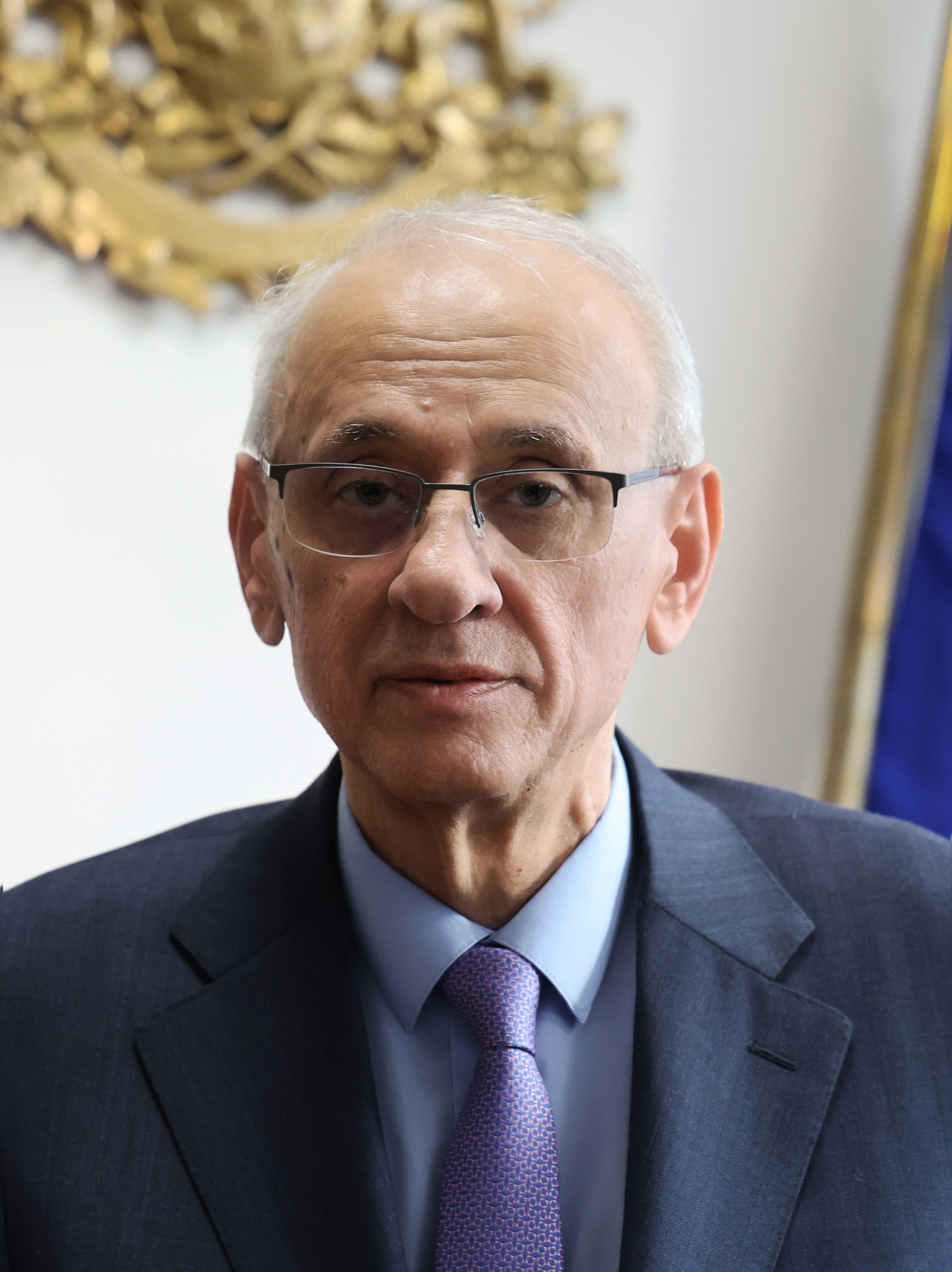

Minister of Health
- Incumbent
- Assumed office 16 January 2025
- Prime Minister: Rosen Zhelyazkov
- Preceded by: Galya Kondeva

Member of the National Assembly
- In office 19 July 2024 – 16 January 2025
- Constituency: 2nd MMC – Burgas (2024-2024); 24-MMC Sofia (2024-2025)
- In office 15 April 2021 – 1 August 2022
- Constituency: 29th MMC – Haskovo

Personal details
- Born: Silvi Kirilov Petrov; 17 December 1950 (age 75) Slavotin, PR Bulgaria
- Party: ITN (since 2021)
- Education: University of National and World Economy; Medical University of Sofia
- Occupation: Politician; doctor

Silvi Kirilov Petrov (Bulgarian: Силви Кирилов Петров, born 17 December 1950) is a Bulgarian politician who has been the Minister of Health since 2025. A member of the ITN party, he previously served as Member of the National Assembly from 2024 to 2025 and from 2021 to 2022.

== Biography ==
Silvi Kirilov was born in Slavotin. He graduated from the Medical University of Sofia with a degree in Urology. Master of Economics with a major in Health Management from the University of National and World Economy (UNWE). Doctor of Medicine.

Since 1977 he has worked at the Medical Academy as an associate professor of urology.

Over the years he has been the executive director of Aleksandrovska University Hospital, Doverie Hospital and Uni Hospital. He has been the director of the Executive Transplant Agency.

Member of the XLV, XLVI, XLVII, L and LI National Assemblies, elected from the lists of the There is Such a People party. As the oldest MP present, 70-year-old Kirilov opened the first session of the XLVII, L and LI National Assemblies.
