= Andrey Tsekov =

Bulgarian politician (born 1973)

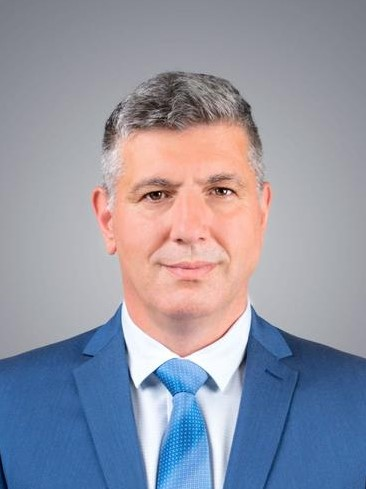
- Tsekov in 2023

Member of the National Assembly
- Incumbent
- Assumed office 19 October 2022
- Constituency: 24th MMC (2022–2024); Blagoevgrad (2024–present)

Minister of Regional Development and Public Works
- In office 6 June 2023 – 9 April 2024
- Prime Minister: Nikolai Denkov
- Preceded by: Ivan Shishkov
- Succeeded by: Violeta Koritarova-Kasabova

Personal details
- Born: 13 April 1973 (age 53)
- Party: We Continue the Change

Andrey Ivanov Tsekov (Bulgarian: Андрей Иванов Цеков; born 13 April 1973) is a Bulgarian politician of We Continue the Change serving as a member of the National Assembly since 2022. From 2023 to 2024, he served as minister of regional development and public works.

In November 2024, he was nominated by PP-DB as Speaker of the National Assembly.
