= Dzhevdet Chakarov =

Bulgarian politician (born 1960)

- Джевдет Чакъров
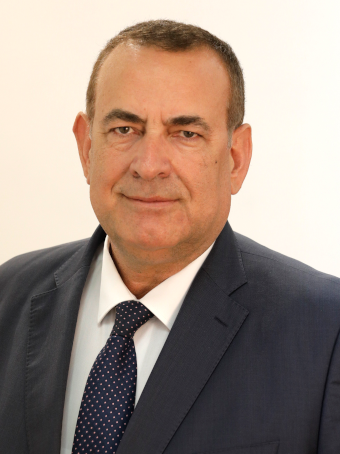
- Official portrait, 2021

Leader of the Movement for Rights and Freedoms
- In office 24 February 2024 – 27 May 2025 Serving with Delyan Peevski (disputed since August 2024)
- Preceded by: Mustafa Karadayi
- Succeeded by: Delyan Peevski (disputed)

Minister of Environment and Waters
- In office 17 August 2005 – 27 July 2009
- Prime Minister: Sergey Stanishev
- Preceded by: Dolores Arsenova
- Succeeded by: Nona Karadzhova

Member of the National Assembly
- Incumbent
- Assumed office 14 July 2009
- Constituency: 2nd MMC - Burgas (2009-2013); 17th MMC - Plovdiv (2013-2021); 20th MMC - Silistra (2021-present)
- In office 5 July 2001 – 17 August 2005
- Constituency: 8th MMC - Dobrich

Personal details
- Born: Dzhevdet Ibryam Chakarov; 8 August 1960 (age 66) Asenovgrad, PR Bulgaria
- Party: DPS (1990-2024, 2025-present); Alliance for Rights and Freedoms (2024-2025)
- Children: 2
- Education: Plovdiv Medical University
- Occupation: Politician; surgeon; author

Dzhevdet Ibryam Chakarov is a Turkish Bulgarian politician who is a long term and current Member of the National Assembly of Bulgaria. A member of the DPS party, he also served as the Minister of Environment and Waters from 2005 to 2009. Since 2024, Chakarov has been the co-leader of the DPS party alongside Delyan Peevski. After the party split in two in July 2024, Chakarov became leader of the faction which later entered the Alliance for Rights and Freedoms coalition.

Prior to becoming politically active, Chakarov worked as a surgeon.
