= Radostin Vasilev =

Bulgarian politician (born 1985)

- Радостин Василев
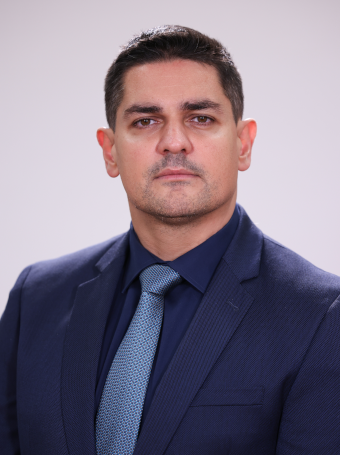
- Vasilev in 2024

Leader of the Morality, Unity, Honour Party
- Incumbent
- Assumed office 9 February 2024
- Preceded by: Position established

Minister of Youth and Sports
- In office 13 December 2021 – 2 August 2022
- Prime Minister: Kiril Petkov
- Preceded by: Andrey Kuzmanov
- Succeeded by: Vesela Letcheva

Member of the National Assembly
- Incumbent
- Assumed office 11 November 2024
- Constituency: 25th MMC - Sofia
- In office 15 April 2021 – 19 June 2024
- Constituency: 15th MMC - Pleven

Personal details
- Born: Radostin Petev Vasilev; 1 January 1985 (age 41) Pleven, PR Bulgaria
- Party: MECh (since 2024)
- Other political affiliations: ITN (2021–2022); PP (2022–2023)
- Children: 2
- Education: Sofia University
- Occupation: Politician; lawyer

Radostin Petev Vasilev (Bulgarian: Радостин Петев Василев, born January 1, 1985) is a Bulgarian politician who served as Minister of Youth and Sports from 2021 to 2022. Formerly affiliated with the ITN and PP parties successively, he also served as Member of the National Assembly from 2021 to 2024. In 2024, Vasilev founded his own political party, Morality, Unity, Honour, and became its leader.
