= Borislav Gutsanov =

Bulgarian politician (born 1967)

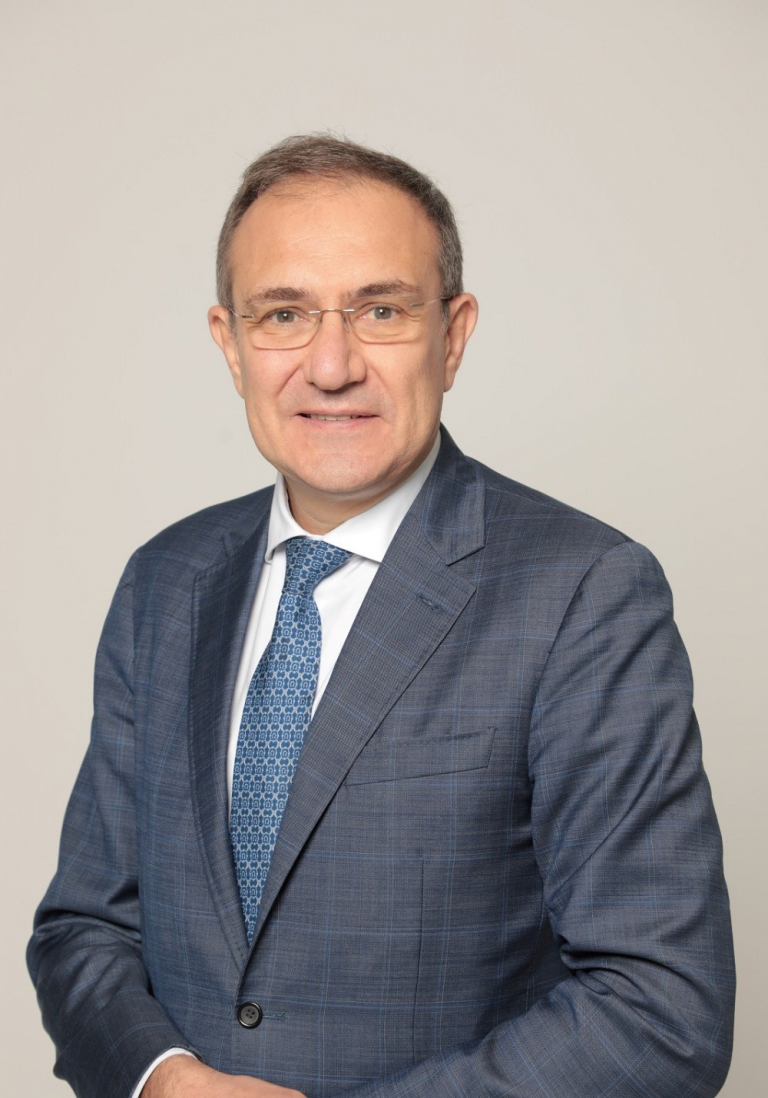

Minister of Labour and Social Affairs
- Incumbent
- Assumed office 16 January 2025
- Prime Minister: Rosen Zhelyazkov

Member of the National Assembly
- In office 15 April 2021 – 16 January 2025
- Constituency: Varna
- In office 21 May 2013 – 5 August 2014
- Constituency: Varna

Personal details
- Born: 17 June 1967 (age 58)
- Party: Bulgarian Socialist Party

Borislav Gutsanov Gutsanov (Bulgarian: Борислав Гуцанов Гуцанов; born 17 June 1967) is a Bulgarian politician. He has been a member of the National Assembly since 2021, having previously served from 2013 to 2014. He served as parliamentary chairman of the Bulgarian Socialist Party in 2024, and has served as co-chairman since 2024.
