= Rosen Zhelyazkov =

Prime Minister of Bulgaria from 2025 to 2026

- Росен Желязков
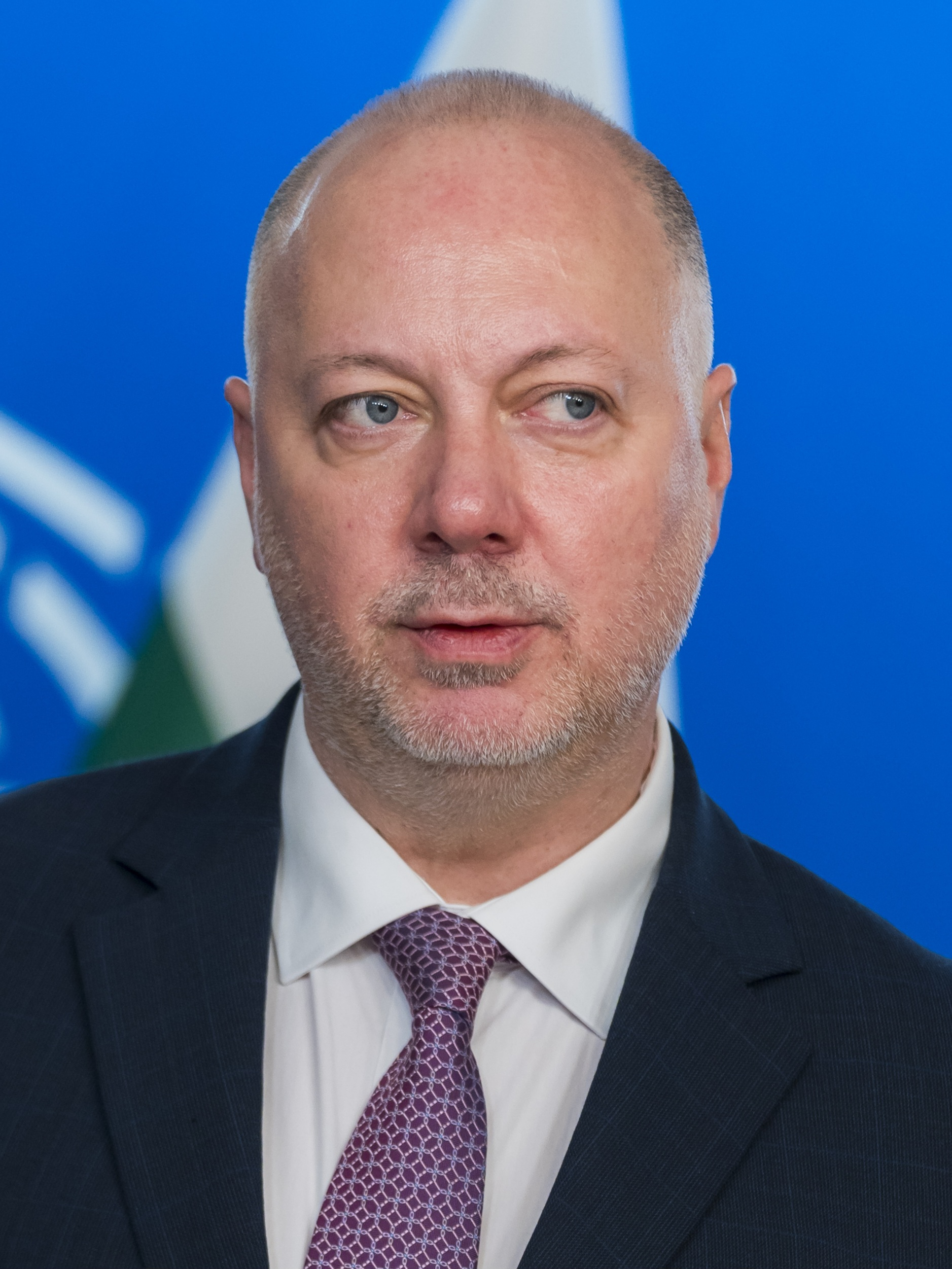
- Zhelyazkov in 2025

Prime Minister of Bulgaria
- In office 16 January 2025 – 19 February 2026 (Note: Caretaker: 11 December 2025 – 19 February 2026)
- President: Rumen Radev; Iliana Iotova
- Deputy: Tomislav Donchev; Atanas Zafirov; Grozdan Karadzhov
- Preceded by: Dimitar Glavchev (caretaker)
- Succeeded by: Andrey Gurov (caretaker)

Speaker of the National Assembly
- In office 19 April 2023 – 25 April 2024
- Preceded by: Vezhdi Rashidov
- Succeeded by: Raya Nazaryan

Member of the National Assembly
- In office 21 July 2021 – 16 January 2025
- Constituency: 1st — Blagoevgrad

Minister of Transport, Information Technologies and Communications
- In office 20 September 2018 – 12 May 2021
- Prime Minister: Boyko Borisov
- Preceded by: Ivaylo Moskovski
- Succeeded by: Georgi Todorov

Personal details
- Born: Rosen Dimitrov Zhelyazkov; 5 April 1968 (age 58) Sofia, Bulgaria
- Party: GERB
- Children: 2
- Education: Sofia University
- Occupation: Politician; lawyer

Rosen Dimitrov Zhelyazkov (Note: Bulgarian: Росен Димитров Желязков, pronounced [ˈrosɛn ʒɛˈʎaskof]; RO-sen-zhel-YAZ-kof) (born 5 April 1968) is a Bulgarian politician who served as Prime Minister of Bulgaria from 2025 to 2026. He previously served as Minister of Transport from 2018 to 2021, Member of the National Assembly from 2021 to 2025, and Speaker of the National Assembly from 2023 to 2024. He is a member of the conservative GERB party.

== Early life, education, and career ==
Zhelyazkov was born in Sofia on 5 April 1968. He earned a master's degree in Law from Sofia University.

In 1994, he began his career as a legal advisor for Sofia Municipality's Sredets district, where he held senior legal positions as well as positions in the local administration. In 1995, he was accepted into the Sofia Lawyers Association as an attorney specialising in civil and commercial law.

== Political career ==
=== Municipal administration ===
Zhelyazkov held his first political position from 1998 to 1999, when he was Deputy Mayor for "Law and Control" of Lozenets district.

In 2003, he was appointed as Secretary of Sofia Municipality by then-mayor Stefan Sofiyanski and was re-appointed to the role after the election of Boyko Borisov in 2005.

In 2009, after Borisov became prime-minister, Zhelyazkov was given the post of Secretary to the Ministerial Council, a position responsible for the administrative functions of the cabinet.

=== State Administrator ===
Zhelyazkov served as Secretary to the Ministerial Cabinet between 2009 and 2013 under both Borisov and interim Prime Minister Marin Raykov. In addition, he also served as chairman of the board of the Institute for Public Administration from 2011 to 2013 and represented Bulgaria at the European Institute for Public Administration (EIPA).

As secretary to the cabinet under the Raykov Government, Zhelyazkov was implicated in the so-called "Kostinbrod affair" surrounding the 2013 Bulgarian parliamentary election. A number of political parties, most notably the BSP, alleged that around 350,000 ballots were printed illegally at a facility in Kostinbrod with the authorisation of the caretaker government. As part of the investigation, Zhelyazkov was charged by the Prosecutor's Office for dereliction of his duty to oversee the proper printing of ballots. In 2014, the Sofia City Court found no evidence of wrongdoing by Zhelyazkov and ruled that he was innocent.

From 2016 to 2017, Zhelyazkov served as a Public Administration and e-Government advisor to Prime Minister Boyko Borisov. In this role, he helped draft legislation for the implementation of e-government in Bulgaria and represented the country at the annual summit for open government partnership.

Zhelyazkov was nominated for the position of Chairman of the Commission for the Protection of Competitiveness by GERB in April 2016, but ultimately withdrew his candidacy due to a lack of competition and after an appeal by Borisov for his party to withdraw from the process.

On 30 September 2016, he was appointed Chairman of the newly-created State e-Government Agency. In this role, Zhelyazkov was responsible for overseeing the digitalisation of state services and the implementation of online solutions for government-issued documents.

In October 2017, he was appointed as head of the Commission for the Regulation of Messages, responsible for overseeing the postal, radio, and e-signature state services.

=== Minister of Transport ===
On 20 September 2018, Zhelyazkov was elected by the National Assembly as Minister of Transport, Information Technology, and Communications. His appointment to the position came following the resignation of his predecessor, Ivaylo Moskovski, following a traffic accident near the town of Svoge.

Shortly after his election, Zhelyazkov promised to work closely with the National Assembly and aimed to continue the programs started by Moskovski. In one of his first acts as Minister, Zhelyazkov ended the concession of Plovdiv Airport following the withdrawal of the previous concessioners. Additionally, he chose to extend the deadline for the concession of Sofia Airport.

In November 2018, Zhelyazkov announced a change in the leadership of the Bulgarian State Railways after a number of allegations of misappropriation of funds, as well as a lack of communication with the Transport Minister.

During negotiations about the implementation of new amendments to the EU "mobility package", which aimed to regulate the status of inter-state logistical networks, Zhelyazkov opposed the proposed amendments for weakening workers' rights in the Bulgarian transportation sector and supported protests organised by them. In January 2019, Zhelyazkov announced that Bulgaria had managed to gain certain concessions about the status of Bulgarian lorry drivers during negotiations with EU institutions, although the concessions were judged as unsatisfactory by the lorry drivers union.

Another challenge faced by Zhelyazkov were allegations by the Bulgarian Socialist Party that the contract for the concession of Sofia Airport was contrary to European legal practices due to undue favouritism towards a private company. He denied these allegations, highlighting that the contract only restricted the rights of the state. Ultimately, despite obstructions from the BSP, the airport was given to Sof Connect in June 2019. The choice of Sof Connect was challenged legally by a number of other participants in the process, for alleged uncompetitive practices of the Transport Ministry. The official contract of the concession was signed by Zhelyazkov on 22 July 2020.

In February 2019, the bus drivers' union of Bulgaria threatened to hold a national strike due to unclear regulations surrounding the distribution of state subsidies to the sector. In response, a number of measures were announced to improve the working conditions of bus drivers and improve the distribution of state funds.

In an interview with bTV, Zhelyazkov admitted that widespread corruption remained a key problem in the "Automobile administration" department, and promised to address its "structural" causes. Looking to reduce the bureaucratic burden on car registrations, he proposed a law allowing car owners to receive a technical inspection of their vehicles by private firms rather than exclusively by the automobile administration. The law was criticised by the BSP and some media outlets for allegedly enabling criminal activity.

Zhelyazkov oversaw the construction of the 5G telecommunication infrastructure in Bulgaria.

In 2020, the Ministry of Transport decided to resume the process for the concession of Plovdiv Airport for a 35-year period.

In coordination with the Ministry of Education, Zhelyazkov attempted to reform the driving license examination requirements, including increasing the number of driving hours while reducing the theoretical requirements. The measure was opposed by driving schools, who alleged that the increased administrative burdens provided by the law, as well as the increase in driving hours, will lead to financial losses and over-work. Zhelyazkov defended the law, claiming that it would digitalise many elements of the examination process, thus in effect reducing corruption. Ultimately, the planned reforms were not implemented.

As part of the government's efforts to combat the economic impacts of COVID-19, Zhelyazkov authorised the implementation of the 60/40 wage scheme within the transport sector.

Zhelyazkov's tenure as Minister of Transport ended following the dissolution of the Third Borisov Government in May 2021.

=== Parliamentary activity and Speakership ===
He was a Member of Parliament (GERB-UDF) in the 45th, 46th, 47th, 48th and 49th National Assembly. He was consistently selected as the list-leader for the GERB-SDS list in the Blagoevgrad MMC.

On 19 April 2023, following an agreement between GERB-UDF and the second largest group in the National Assembly – PP-DB, Rosen Zhelyazkov was elected Speaker of the Bulgarian Parliament with 136 votes in favour.

On 25 April 2024, Zhelyazkov was removed from the post of Chairperson of the National Assembly with 129 votes in favour, a day prior to the disbandenment of the 49th National Assembly before the June 2024 Bulgarian parliamentary election.

Zhelyaskov was selected as the list-leader for GERB-SDS for the 2024 European Parliament election, however did not take his seat within the European Parliament.

He was nominated as the GERB-SDS Prime Ministerial candidate, following the June 2024 parliamentary elections. On 1 July 2024, Zhelyazkov received the first exploratory mandate for government formation by President Rumen Radev following the June 2024 Bulgarian parliamentary election. Zhelyazkov stated that he aimed to form a minority government and presented the composition of his cabinet before Radev on the day, thus fulfilling the first mandate. On 3 July, the National Assembly voted 138–98 to reject his proposed government, thus voiding the first mandate.

== Prime Minister of Bulgaria (2025–2026) ==
Zhelyazkov was selected as one of the members of the GERB-SDS negotiating team following the October 2024 parliamentary election, tasked with negotiating the formation of a regular government with DB, the BSP and ITN.

In early January 2025, it was revealed that Zhelyazkov was the Prime Ministerial nominee from GERB-SDS leading to DB leaving the aforementioned government negotiations and a temporary suspension of the negotiations as a whole. Negotiations later resumed between the three parties, with external support being sought from representatives of DPS-Dogan.

On 15 January, Zhelyazkov received and returned the first exploratory mandate to President Radev, presenting the composition of his cabinet. In his statement to the President, he outlined that the goal of the cabinet was to stabilise the country following a cycle of irregular elections and that the cabinet was based on mutual compromises between the parties participating in it. The National Assembly voted in favour of the Zhelyazkov Government, with Zhelyazkov as Prime Minister on 16 January 2025, with a majority of 125 votes.

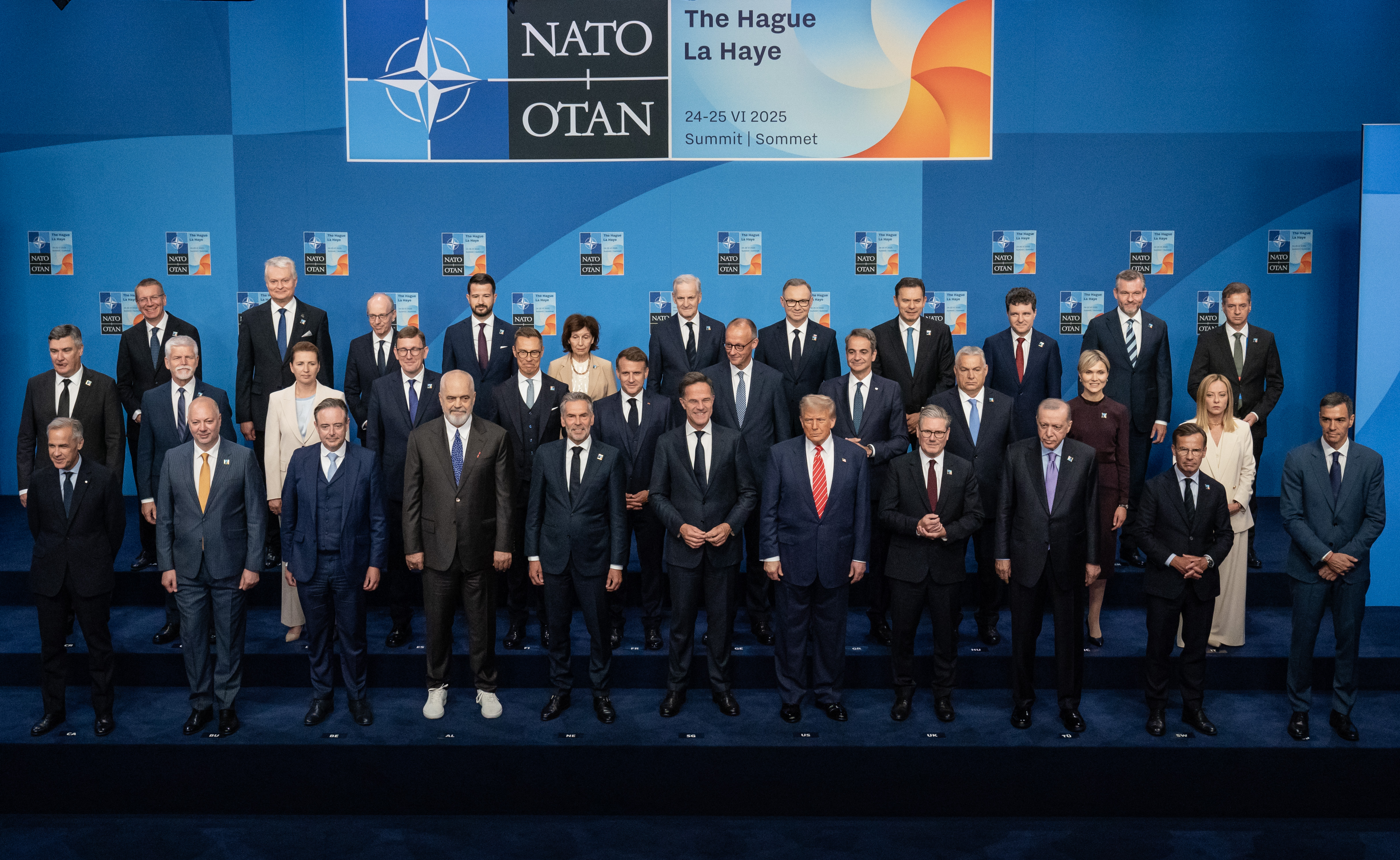
Rosen Zhelyazkov at the 2025 The Hague NATO summit (bottom left)

Following the investiture vote, Zhelyazkov met with his predecessor, Caretaker Prime Minister, Dimitar Glavchev, in the traditional transfer of power ceremony. In his statement during the ceremony, Zhelyazkov promised to present the cabinet's governance plan within a month and noted that he expected a productive dialogue with the parliamentary opposition.

From 21 to 22 January, Zhelyazkov departed on his first foreign visit to Strasbourg, where he met with EU Commission President Ursula von der Leyen, EU Council President Antonio Costa, European Parliament Speaker Roberta Metsola, as well as Bulgarian MEPs.

On 23 January, Zhelyazkov oversaw the first meeting of his cabinet, during which it was decided to withdraw the previously drafted budget for 2025 developed by the preceding caretaker Glavchev government.

=== Resignation ===
Major protests weakened his government in November 2025, forcing him to abandon his controversial budget plan, which included tax increases. In addition to the budget issue, other sources of discontent, such as rising prices amid the transition to the euro and corruption among government officials, contributed to the prime minister's unpopularity.

Zhelyazkov announced his pending resignation as Prime Minister on 11 December 2025 following weeks of country-wide protests against his government.

== See also ==
- List of current heads of state and government
- List of heads of the executive by approval rating

== Notes ==
Political offices
Preceded by Dimitar Glavchev	Prime Minister of Bulgaria; 2025–2026	Succeeded by Andrey Gyurov
