= Supreme Administrative Court of Bulgaria =

The Supreme Administrative Court of Bulgaria was first established on 25 November 1878 as one of the three divisions of the then-single Supreme Court. It did not exist during the Communist rule, but was restored in 1991.

The purpose of the Court is outlined in the Constitution: "Article 125 (1) The Supreme Administrative Court shall exercise supreme judicial oversight as to the precise and equal application of the law in administrative justice. (2) The Supreme Administrative Court shall rule on all challenges to the legality of acts of the Council of Ministers and the individual ministers, and of other acts established by law.

The Supreme Administrative Court became a separate institution with the promulgation of the Administrative Justice Law from 3 April 1912. The Constitution of the People’s Republic of Bulgaria of 1947 did not provide for judicial supervision over administrative acts, and as a result the Supreme Administrative Court was closed in 1948 by virtue of the Law on the Structure of People’s Courts. Bulgaria's seventh Grand National Assembly reestablished the Court in 1991.

The Constitution of the Republic of Bulgaria of 1991 provides for the establishment of a Supreme Administrative Court within one year. This requirement was not met and the SAC was reinstated only in 1996.

The current Chairman of the Supreme Administrative Court is Georgi Kolev. He was appointed to this position in 2010. The Deputies are Veneta Markovska and Galina Solakova. The Court consists of two colleges and six divisions, each with a particular sphere of responsibilities.

The Supreme Administrative Court publishes a periodical, the Administrative Justice Journal. It is used to describe the problems of Administrative Law and to present practices from the relevant European judicial institutions.
