= Ivan Peshev =

Bulgarian politician (born 1986)

- Иван Пешев
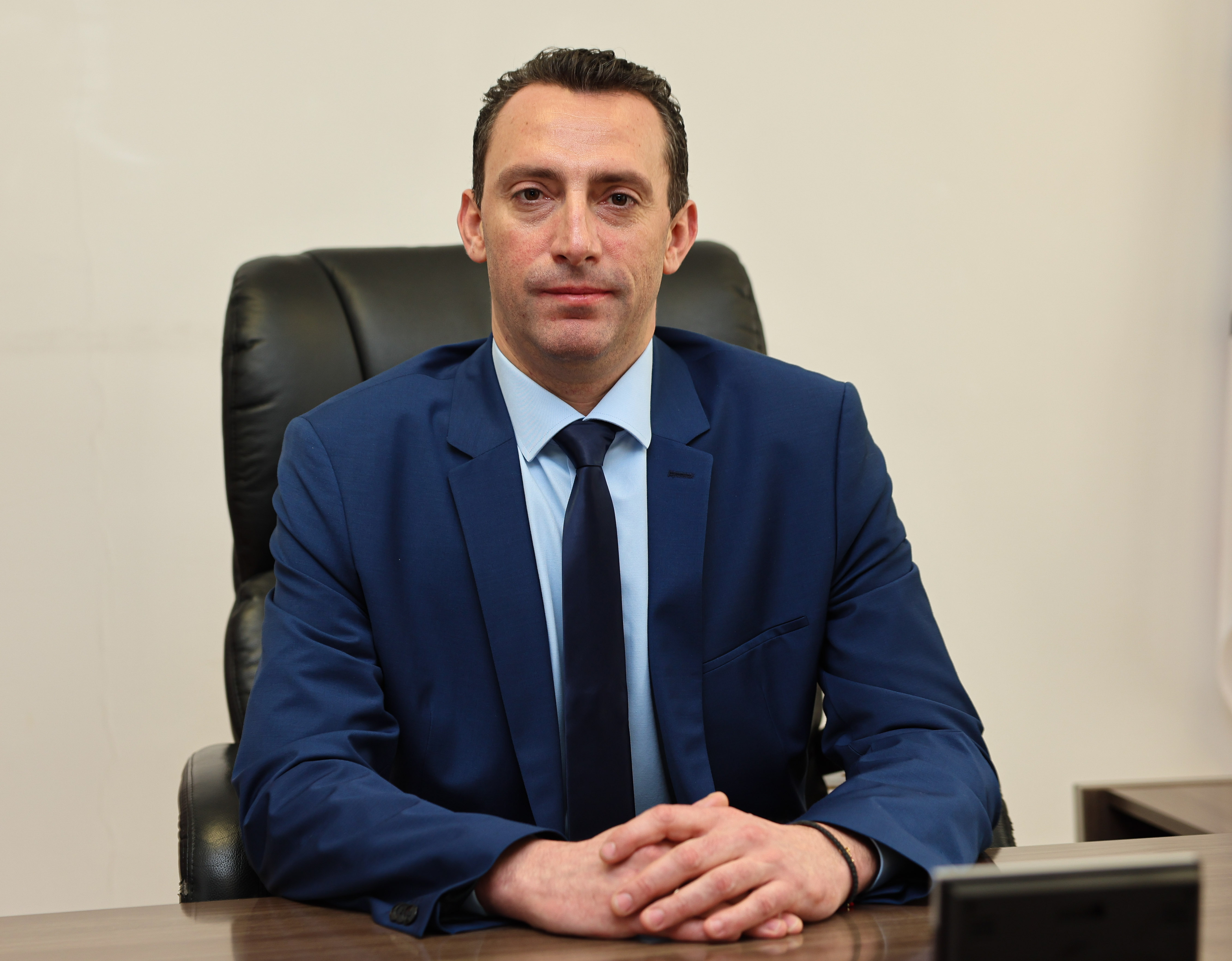
- Peshev in 2025

Minister of Youth and Sports
- In office 16 January 2025 – 19 February 2026
- Preceded by: Georgi Glouchkov
- Succeeded by: Dimitar Iliev

Personal details
- Born: 4 February 1986 (age 40) Sofia, PR Bulgaria
- Party: Bulgarian Socialist Party

Ivan Maksimov Peshev (Bulgarian: Иван Максимов Пешев; born 4 February 1986) is a Bulgarian politician who had served as Minister of Youth and Sports. He has been a member of the Sofia City Council since 2019.
