= Second Glavchev Government =

Government of Bulgaria (2024–2025)

- 104th Cabinet of Bulgaria
- 2024–2025
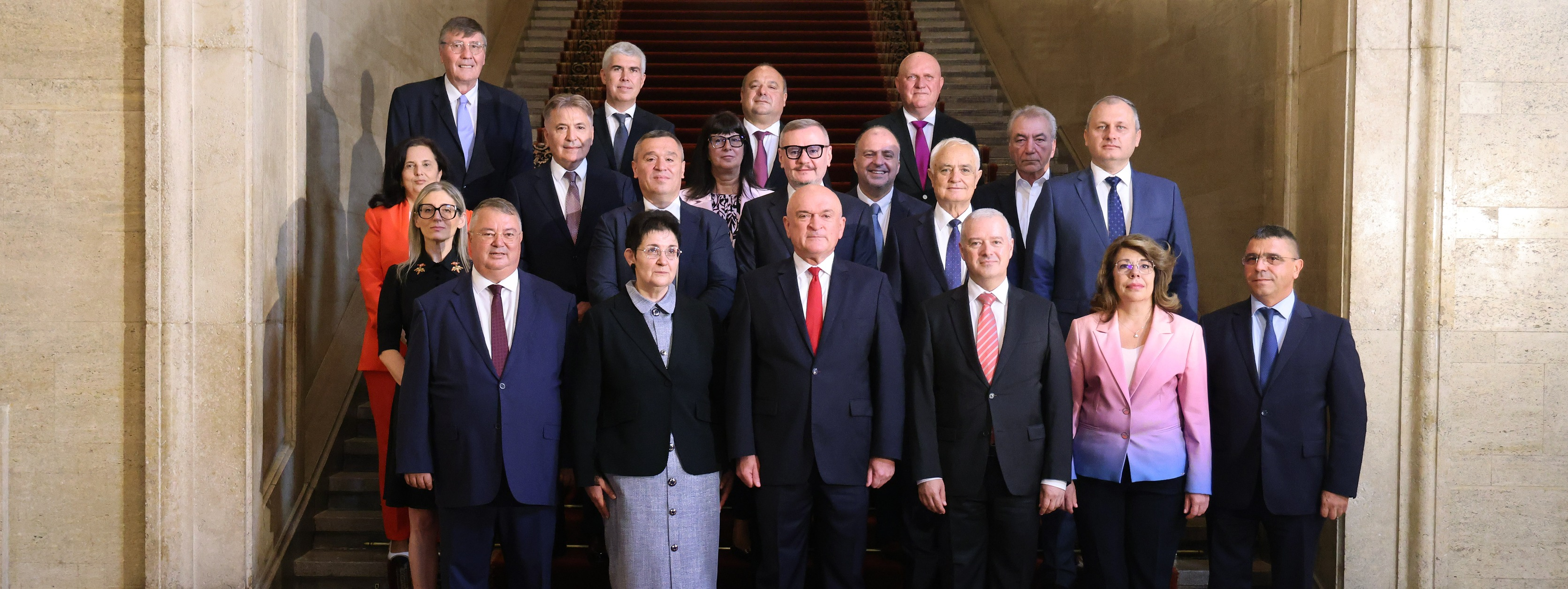
- Second Glavchev Cabinet
- Date formed: 27 August 2024
- Date dissolved: 16 January 2025

People and organisations
- President: Rumen Radev
- Prime Minister: Dimitar Glavchev
- Deputy Prime Minister: Lyudmila Petkova
- No. of ministers: 20
- Status in legislature: Caretaker government

History
- Legislature terms: 50th National Assembly of Bulgaria and 51st National Assembly of Bulgaria
- Predecessor: Glavchev I
- Successor: Zhelyazkov

The Second Glavchev Government was the 104th cabinet of Bulgaria. It was appointed by President Rumen Radev on 27 August 2024, and sworn in the same day at the National Assembly of Bulgaria. 17 out of 20 ministers were reappointed and continued their job as ministers in the same portfolios held in the preceding First Glavchev Government, with new appointments only made for the Minister of Foreign Affairs, Minister of Interior and Minister of Transport and Communications. Its tenure ended following the election of the Zhelyazkov government by the National Assembly on 16 January 2025.

== Cabinet ==
Portfolio	Minister	Took office	Left office	Party
Prime Minister	Dimitar Glavchev	27 August 2024 (reappointed)	16 January 2025	Independent
Deputy Prime Minister and Minister of Finance	Lyudmila Petkova	27 August 2024 (reappointed)	16 January 2025	Independent
Minister of Interior	Atanas Ilkov	27 August 2024	16 January 2025	Independent
Minister of Defence	Atanas Zapryanov	27 August 2024 (reappointed)	16 January 2025	Independent
Minister of Foreign Affairs	Ivan Kondov	27 August 2024	16 January 2025	Independent
Minister of Justice	Mariya Pavlova	27 August 2024 (reappointed)	16 January 2025	Independent
Minister of Health	Galya Kondeva	27 August 2024 (reappointed)	16 January 2025	Independent
Minister of Education and Science	Galin Tsokov	27 August 2024 (reappointed)	16 January 2025	Independent
Minister of Agriculture and Foods	Georgi Tahov	27 August 2024 (reappointed)	16 January 2025	Independent
Minister of Transport and Communications	Krasimira Stoyanova	27 August 2024	16 January 2025	Independent
Minister of Environment and Waters	Petar Dimitrov	27 August 2024 (reappointed)	16 January 2025	Independent
Minister of Energy	Vladimir Malinov	27 August 2024 (reappointed)	16 January 2025	Independent
Minister of Tourism	Evtim Miloshev	27 August 2024 (reappointed)	16 January 2025	Independent
Minister of Economy and Industry	Petko Nikolov	27 August 2024 (reappointed)	16 January 2025	Independent
Minister of Regional Development and Public Works	Violeta Koritarova	27 August 2024 (reappointed)	16 January 2025	Independent
Minister of Culture	Nayden Todorov	27 August 2024 (reappointed)	16 January 2025	Independent
Minister of Youth and Sports	Georgi Glushkov	27 August 2024 (reappointed)	16 January 2025	Independent
Minister of Electronic Governance	Valentin Mundrov	27 August 2024 (reappointed)	16 January 2025	Independent
Minister of Innovation and Growth	Rosen Karadimov	27 August 2024 (reappointed)	16 January 2025	Independent

== Tenure ==
=== Cabinet (re-)appointment ===
The Second Glavchev government was sworn in before the National Assembly on August the 27th. The cabinet had largely the same composition as the first glavchev caretaker government, with the notable replacement of Kalin Stoyanov by Atanas Ilkov, as Minister of Interior, as well as the replacement of Georgi Gvozdeykov by Krasimira Stoyanova, as Minister of Transport. Additionally, Glavchev relinquished the position of Minister of Foreign Affairs, which he had held in the first caretaker cabinet, appointing deputy-minister Ivan Kondov to the position.

Despite the change of Ilkov for Stoyanov, a number of political parties, particularly PP-DB and Revival, expressed a lack of faith that the changes will significantly alter the behaviour of the government and claimed it remained controlled by GERB leader, Boyko Borisov and DPS-Peevski leader, Delyan Peevski. Other parties, notably the BSP, commended Glavchev for undertaking the changes.

=== Organisation of Elections ===
As per the Bulgarian constitution, the primary role of a Caretaker Government is the organisation of snap legislative elections, with the elections in this case being scheduled for the 27th of October.

On the 12th of September, the cabinet sent a number of recommendations to the Central Electoral Commission in order to increase the transparency of the election process, including greater verification of the machine voting systems and steps to increase the secureness of paper ballots.

A major obstacle in the organisation of the elections came in late-September, when the company which had previously stored and delivered machines for voting, Siela Normal, announced that it wished for a greater compensation in return for the service that it provides. The cabinet, for its part, claimed that as it was not a party to the contract (which was signed and executed by the Central Electoral Commission), it was unable to intervene. Ultimately, the Electoral Commission ended up providing the amount required by the company in order to insure the availability of machine voting at the elections.

By 22 October, the Ministry of Interior announced that it had carried out 204 operations to prevent vote buying, including the arrest of 42 individuals.

The publication of provisional election results on October the 27th and 28th was accompanied by wide-scale allegations of vote buying, as well as other electoral irregularities by a number of political parties and civil organisations. The alleged failure of the caretaker government to organise free and fair elections led to calls for its resignation by various political forces, specifically by the parliamentary party, ITN.

In a press briefing immediately after the election, Caretaker Minister of the Interior, Atanas Ilkov, lamented that while reports of electoral law violations had increased, there was little evidence to support the notion that the ministry had failed to prevent electoral irregularities. This was similarly evident in the report of the Ministry, which claimed that the Ministry had undertaken all possible actions in order to prevent violations of electoral law, although did not exclude the possibility of future analyses to improve the work of the ministry during election time.

Prime Minister Glavchev similarly praised the cabinet's organisation of the elections, commenting on October the 28th that a number of steps were taken, including the greater verification of machine-voting devices, in order to insure the integrity of the voting process. Discussing the election at a cabinet session on November the 13th, Glavchev categorised the preceding October legislative elections as "the most verified elections" and argued that the cabinet had fulfilled its task of organising free and fair elections.

In its annual report, published on January 2, 2025, the Glavchev cabinet credited itself with successfully organising free and fair elections.

=== Foreign Policy activity ===
==== Increased tensions in the Middle East ====
The Glavchev caretaker cabinet undertook a number of steps to address the security threats generated by the increased tensions in the Middle Eastern region, motivated by the intensification of the Israel-Hezbollah conflict, as well as the Iranian involvement in it.

On 28 September, with an Israeli ground operation into Lebanese territory looking imminent, the Glavchev government organised a work-group to coordinate the evacuation of Bulgarian citizens from Lebanon. By 4 October, 169 Bulgarians had been evacuated from Lebanon according to the caretaker government, with a further 25 being evacuated on a Canadian-sponsored flight to Istanbul.

On 2 October, an in-cabinet security council was summoned by Glavchev to discuss the possible implications of the escalation in the Middle East on Bulgarian security, especially after the Iranian strike on Israel. While the council found little evidence that Bulgaria was at risk of increased terrorist activity and identified few imminent threats to national security, however new security measures, including an increased police presence around strategic locations and the Israeli embassy in Sofia were approved. А further Consultative Council for National Security was held at the President's behest on the 4th of October, but generally re-affirmed the findings of the cabinet.

==== Military & Diplomatic cooperation with Ukraine ====
As in the previous Glavchev caretaker cabinet, Bulgaria continued to offer military and diplomatic support for Ukraine as part of the Russo-Ukrainian War. On September 3d, caretaker minister of defense, Atanas Zapryanov, confirmed that Bulgaria had delivered 8 military-aid packages to Ukraine, all of them strictly in line with previous parliamentary decisions and largely composed of out-dated equipment in-storage.

Speaking at the EU Council meeting in October, Glavchev re-affirmed that his cabinet would continue to provide military and diplomatic aid to Ukraine.

In December, caretaker Prime Minister Dimitar Glavchev was set to sign a long-term security cooperation agreement with Ukraine during the monthly meeting of the European Council in Brussels. However, on the 18th of December, the cabinet approved a position written by Glavchev, that stated that they did not believe Glavchev should sign the agreement unless such a mandate was given by the National Assembly. This move provoked confusion from the parliamentary parties, GERB and PP-DB, who claimed that Glavchev was entitled to sign such a security agreement due to prior National Assembly decisions. Ultimately, the National Assembly refused to vote on the matter, with Glavchev subsequently not signing the document.

==== Schengen Area membership ====
Continued efforts to insure Bulgaria's full membership in the Schengen Area were one of the key priorities for the Glavchev government. During the EU Council meeting in October, Glavchev lamented that the cabinet had taken steps to significantly reduce illegal migration on its external border.

On 22 October, the Glavchev caretaker cabinet co-signed a joint-declaration with Romania, Hungary and Austria, in which Romania and Bulgaria promised to continue regular border checks on the Bulgarian-Romanian land border, as well as the implementation of other steps to decrease the risk of illegal migration, in exchange for Austria withholding its right to veto the full membership of the nations in the Schengen Area.

On 28 November, the cabinet officially authorised the formation of a working group with the aim of reforming all border guard services in preparation for the entrance into the Schengen Area on 1 January.

On 12 December, the European Council officially voted in favour of Romania and Bulgaria becoming full members of the Schengen Area from 1 January.

Shortly thereafter, the cabinet approved measures in relation to the prior joint-declaration, including the temporary continuation of border checkpoints at the internal border of Romania and Bulgaria for the next 6 months.

On 1 January 2025, alongside Romania, Bulgaria became a full member of the Schengen Area, an event that was listed as a major accomplishment in the annual report of the cabinet.

=== Public Finances & 2025 Budget ===
The second Glavchev caretaker cabinet had to deal with an increasing deficit. At the start of September, Ministry of Finance reported that the deficit had increased by around 600 million leva in August, thus reaching a total sum of 1.6 billion leva, motivated primarily by pension increases which had taken effect in the summer of 2024. By October, the deficit had increased to a total sum of 2.8 billion leva, representing 1.4% of GDP, with caretaker Finance Minister, Velkova, noting that the exponential increase in the deficit was primarily a concequence of decreased non-tax revenues and increases in spending. Worryingly, by November the deficit had reached 4 billion Leva (around 2% of GDP), thus potentially disrupting the budgetary frame of a 3% deficit to GDP ratio set in the 2024 budget. Ultimately, the budget deficit was somewhat decreased by the end of the fiscal year due to increases in state revenues, however it remained higher comparative to the same period of 2023.

Due to the absence of a regular government, the caretaker cabinet was tasked with developing the budget for the fiscal year of 2025. Legally, the cabinet had to submit its budget for review by the National Assembly by the 31 October, however due to the recently held elections the cabinet voted to postpone the submission of its draft-budget until the of the next parliament. Commenting the future budget of the government in early November, caretaker Minister of Finance, Lyudmila Velkova, made clear that the project-budget looked to address the increased deficit by introducing measures such as increasing the VAT on certain goods (such as cigarettes), as well as putting a brake on wage-increases for state workers.

On 4 December, the cabinet officially submitted its project-budget to the parliament. The budget, while preserving a budget-frame deficit of 3% to GDP, included a number of increases to the VAT rate, as well as the freezing of a number of social spending initiatives (particularly, pension increases). The proposed budget was criticised by a number of parliamentary parties, trade unions as well as the Bulgarian National Bank, for allegedly increasing projected-spending without cause and setting up unsustainable revenue streams.

Due to opposition from the National Assembly, the caretaker cabinet proposed a law on 31 December that aimed to extend certain welfare payments and revenue collection methods until the adoption of a budget for 2025, thus insuring that essential government activity continued.

=== Winter electricity shortages ===
In December, 2024, around 100 settlements in Bulgaria with a cumulative population of around 20,000 people experienced acute shortages of electricity. In response, the government directed around 2 million Leva in order to compensate the victims of the shortages, and undertook the payment of certain electrical bills.
