= First Glavchev Government =

Government of Bulgaria (Apr–Aug 2024)

- 103rd Cabinet of Bulgaria
- 2024
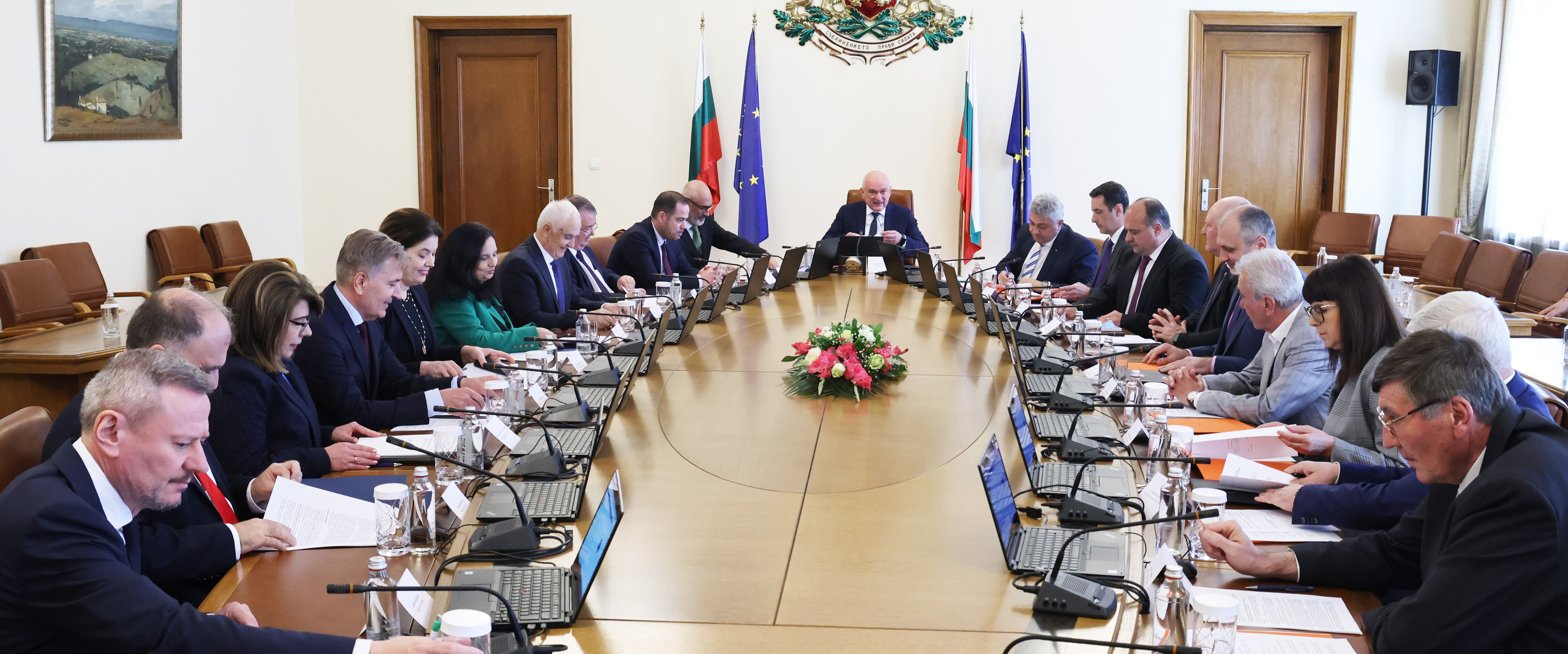
- Date formed: 9 April 2024
- Date dissolved: 27 August 2024

People and organisations
- President: Rumen Radev
- Prime Minister: Dimitar Glavchev
- Deputy Prime Minister: Lyudmila Petkova
- No. of ministers: 20
- Status in legislature: Caretaker government

History
- Legislature terms: 49th National Assembly and 50th National Assembly of Bulgaria
- Predecessor: Denkov
- Successor: Glavchev II

The First Glavchev Government was the 103rd cabinet of Bulgaria. It was appointed by President Rumen Radev on 9 April 2024, and sworn in the same day. The Glavchev Caretaker Cabinet was the first Caretaker Cabinet to be selected using the system created by the Constitutional Amendments of December 2023, and was the first Caretaker Cabinet to be sworn in in the presence of the National Assembly, rather than in the presence of the President.

== Cabinet ==
Portfolio	Minister	Took office	Left office	Party
Prime Minister	Dimitar Glavchev	9 April 2024	27 August 2024	Independent
Deputy Prime Minister and Minister of Finance	Lyudmila Petkova	9 April 2024	27 August 2024	Independent
Minister for Interior	Kalin Stoyanov	9 April 2024	27 August 2024	Independent
Minister of Defence	Atanas Zapryanov	9 April 2024	27 August 2024	Independent
Minister of Foreign Affairs	Stefan Dimitrov	9 April 2024	22 April 2024	Independent
Minister of Foreign Affairs	Dimitar Glavchev	22 April 2024	27 August 2024	Independent
Minister of Justice	Mariya Pavlova	9 April 2024	27 August 2024	Independent
Minister of Health	Galya Kondeva	9 April 2024	27 August 2024	Independent
Minister of Education and Science	Galin Tsokov	9 April 2024	27 August 2024	Independent
Minister of Agriculture and Foods	Kiril Vutev	9 April 2024	22 April 2024	Independent
Minister of Agriculture and Foods	Georgi Tahov	22 April 2024	27 August 2024	Independent
Minister of Transport and Communications	Georgi Gvozdeykov	9 April 2024	27 August 2024	Independent (Note: At the time of his appointment, Gvozdeykov was a member of PP, however he was expelled from the party.)
Minister of Environment and Waters	Petar Dimitrov	9 April 2024	27 August 2024	Independent
Minister of Energy	Vladimir Malinov	9 April 2024	27 August 2024	Independent
Minister of Tourism	Evtim Miloshev	9 April 2024	27 August 2024	Independent
Minister of Economy and Industry	Petko Nikolov	9 April 2024	27 August 2024	Independent
Minister of Regional Development and Public Works	Violeta Koritarova	9 April 2024	27 August 2024	Independent
Minister of Culture	Nayden Todorov	9 April 2024	27 August 2024	Independent
Minister of Youth and Sports	Georgi Glushkov	9 April 2024	27 August 2024	Independent
Minister of Electronic Governance	Valentin Mundrov	9 April 2024	27 August 2024	Independent
Minister of Innovation and Growth	Rosen Karadimov	9 April 2024	27 August 2024	Independent

== Tenure ==
=== Transition of power and initial civil service changes ===
The Glavchev Caretaker Government was officially sworn in on 9 April 2024, in the presence of the National Assembly.

In the days following its investiture, Caretaker Ministers made a number of changes within the civil service. Caretaker Finance Minister Lyudmila Petkova removed the incumbent head of the Customs Agency, Petya Bankova, who was detained in relation to alleged participation in an organised criminal group, and replaced her with Georgi Dimov. The head of the Financial Inspection, Ilka Dimova-Mazgaleva, was similarly replaced with Georgi Yordanov.

Kalin Stoyanov, Caretaker Minister of Interior, requested the removal of Secretary to the Ministry, Zhivko Kotsev. He later announced that he did not intend to appoint a replacement before the elections, allowing deputy Secretary Dimitar Kangaldzhiev to assume the role as Acting Secretary.

The cabinet also saw a number of changes within the deputy ministerial staff. One notable deputy minister appointment was that of former Minister of E-Government and Digitalisation, Alexander Yolovski, as Deputy Minister of E-Government.

On the 26th of April, the government announced a change in a number of oblast executives, including the Executive of Sofia.

By the end of April, Bulgarian media outlet Dnevnik reported that 44 changes had been made by the Glavchev government within the civil service.

In July, the cabinet undertook a number of changes within the security services and the oblast leadership positions. Some media outlets have connected the changes to the rift between Delyan Peevski and Ahmed Dogan within DPS, with it being alleged that the change of the Oblast-Executives of Kardzhali and Smolyan was part of a larger "purge" of pro-Dogan figures within the civil service. Such changes led to allegations by political parties in the National Assembly that Glavchev and other figures in the cabinet were being influenced by Delyan Peevski in making decisions.

=== Cabinet reshuffle ===
Only a week after the appointment of the cabinet, Prime Minister Glavchev requested the removal of two Ministers: the Minister of Foreign Affairs, Stefan Dimitrov, and the Minister of Foods and Agriculture, Kiril Vutev, both of whom he accused of not properly fulfilling their roles. In their place, he proposed GERB MP, Daniel Mitov, for Minister of Foreign Affairs, and head of the State Fund "Agriculture", Georgi Tahov, for Minister of Agriculture.

The cabinet reshuffle led to BSP and Revival submitting a vote of no confidence against the Glavchev government, which a number of legal experts and politicians considered unconstitutional. The vote of no confidence was, however, ultimately not presented before the National Assembly.

On the 19th of April, Mitov officially confirmed that he refused the position of Caretaker Minister of Foreign Affairs.

On the 20th of April, Glavchev announced that he had proposed himself for the position of Caretaker Minister of Foreign Affairs.

On the 22nd of April, Radev officially signed the changes in the Caretaker Cabinet, replacing Stefan Dimitrov with Dimitar Glavchev and Kiril Vutev with Georgi Tahov.

=== Organization of the elections ===
As a Caretaker Cabinet, one of the tasks was to organise the June 2024 Bulgarian parliamentary election and the 2024 European Parliament election in Bulgaria.

In the opening session of the cabinet, PM Dimitar Glavchev underlined that the organisation of "free and fair elections" was the main task of his government.

On the 12th of April, the cabinet met with representatives of the Central Electoral Commission to discuss the organisation of elections, promising full support. During this meeting, it was announced Minister of Transport and Communication, Georgi Gvozdeykov, would be responsible for inter-institutional communication on the topic of elections.

On the 29th of April, Glavchev and other cabinet minister participated in the randomised picking of machine voting installations which were to be inspected.

During events surrounding Europe Day (9 May), Glavchev announced there would likely be a delay in the announcement of results on election day due to the larger quantity of ballots to be counted, and urged parties to refrain from speculation about this delay on election day.

Minister of the Interior, Kalin Stoyanov, confirmed on the same day that the Ministry had received the first reports about alleged vote buying, as well as other violations of the electoral code.

On the 11th of May, Caretaker Minister of E-Government, Valentin Mundrov, confirmed that there would be "no issues with machine voting" during the upcoming elections and that the process of verifying the machine software before the elections was set to begin on the day.

=== Construction of a children's health center in Sofia ===
On the 30th of April, 2024, the Glavchev cabinet approved plans for the construction of a private medical facility in Sofia, specializing in the medical needs of children.

The decision was opposed by most parliamentary-represented parties and President Radev, with critics arguing that children's healthcare was a state competency. The backlash led Glavchev to announce that the project would not be implemented.

On the 7th of May, the Glavchev Government confirmed that it would go ahead with the construction of a state children's health hospital in Sofia, with area at which the hospital was to be built being scheduled for demolition.

=== Foreign policy activity ===
After entering office, the Glavchev government remained committed to continued military aid to Ukraine.

The Caretaker Cabinet was also responsible for hosting the spring session of the NATO Parliamentary Assembly, with it being held in Sofia in late May.

Prior to the vote in the UN GA for the classification of the Srebrenica massacre as a genocide, the cabinet came under fire after a leaked directive from Glavchev seemed to instruct the Bulgarian ambassador to the UN to abstain in the vote, instead of voting in favour as per the Bulgarian official position.

The government also experienced divisions with the President over who was to represent the country during the NATO summit in Washington, with the cabinet wishing for Glavchev to lead the delegation due to Radev's recent statements criticising the foreign policy direction of the alliance.

On the 5th of June, PM Glavchev announced his intention for the parliament to decide who should lead the Bulgarian delegation, unless a regular government had been formed. However, the parliament on the 21st of June proved unable to find a consensus on the matter, leading to the cabinet's eventual decision that both Glavchev and Radev would be present at the summit. It was further decided that President Radev was to represent the delegation based on the position prepared by the cabinet.

On the 27th of June, Radev announced that he would not represent the Bulgarian delegation citing deep disagreements with the position of the cabinet, specifically as pertains to the matter of Ukraine. As a concequence, PM Glavchev announced that he would lead the delegation. Radev's criticism of the Bulgarian position led to calls by the parliamentary group of Revival for the release of the document to the public. The cabinet refused to declassify Bulgaria's, however made clear that the document was in line with prior decisions made by the National Assembly in support of Ukraine.

=== Forest fires crisis ===
In early July, extreme heat in Bulgaria contributed to the outbreak of forest fires, particularly in the southern regions of the country near the border with Greece and Republic of North Macedonia.

In response to the crisis, the cabinet ordered the deployment of military personnel in order to help fire-fighters and asked for support from other EU nations, particularly the Czech Republic and France. The cabinet also promised to compensate victims of the fires, specifically the village of Voden, which suffered serious damage. The cabinet further claimed that by the end of July most of the fires in the south of Bulgaria had been contained.

Despite the government's claims that it had handled the fires well, opinion polling data seemed to suggest a more mixed reception of the government's actions by Bulgarian citizens.

=== Dissolution ===
By the beginning of August, government negotiations for the formation of a regular cabinet had ended unsuccessful, with the third mandate being returned unfulfilled. This meant the end of the tenure of the First Glavchev Caretaker Cabinet and the need for an appointment of a new caretaker cabinet prior to snap elections.

On 9 August, President Radev officially announced that the deputy chairwoman of the Chamber of Audit, Goritsa Grancharova-Kozhareva, was selected to serve as the next Caretaker Prime Minister in place of Glavchev. However, her caretaker cabinet proposal was ultimately rejected by the President on August the 19th.

On August the 22nd, Radev gave Dimitar Glavchev the mandate to form a caretaker government. On the 26th of August, Glavchev presented his second caretaker government to Radev, with Radev approving it and the new government being sworn in on the 27th of August, thus dissolving the first Glavchev caretaker cabinet.
