= 50th National Assembly of Bulgaria =

June 2024 legislature in Bulgaria

50th National Assembly 50-то Народно събрание

History
- Founded: June 19, 2024
- Disbanded: November 11, 2024
- Preceded by: 49th National Assembly
- Succeeded by: 51st National Assembly

Leadership
- Speaker: Raya Nazaryan (GERB)
- Deputy Speakers: Rositsa Kirova (GERB–SDS); Yordan Tsonev (DPS); Atanas Atanasov (PP–DB); Tsoncho Ganev (Revival); Dragomir Stoynev (BSPzB); Andrey Chorbanov (ITN)

Structure
- Seats: 240
- Political groups: GERB—SDS (68) PP-DB (39) Revival (38) DPS (22) BSPzB (18) ITN (16) Independent (39)

Meeting place
- "The Party House", Sofia

Website
- parliament.bg

The Fiftieth National Assembly (Bulgarian: Петдесетото народно събрание) was a convocation of the National Assembly of Bulgaria, formed according to the results of the early parliamentary elections in Bulgaria, held on 9 June 2024.

== Positions and leadership ==
=== National Assembly Speaker and Deputy-Speakers ===
The opening session of the 50th National Assembly, as per tradition, was chaired by the oldest MP, Silvi Kirolov from ITN. During the first day of the opening session, as had occurred in previous parliaments, none of the candidates for speaker managed to gain a majority of 121 votes, with the GERB nominated Raya Nazaryan coming closest with 114 votes. The other candidates for the position included Petar Petrov from Revival, Silvi Kirilov from ITN and Viktoria Vasilieva from Velichie, although none managed to gather support from outside their parliamentary group. The political deadlock was broken following the decision by ITN to vote in favour of all candidates for the Speakership, thus assuring a 10-seat majority for her election. In her speech following her selection, Nazaryan appraised the work of the National Assembly and promised political impartiality.

Following this, the vice-speakers of the National Assembly were similarly selected, with one being given to each of the 7 Parliamentary Groups. On 5 July 2024, Viktoria Vassileva, who had previously been the vice-speaker from Velichie, was automatically removed as vice-speaker due to the dissolution of the Velichie parliamentary group.

=== Permanent committees of the National Assembly ===
The chairperson of each of the permanent committees of the 50th National Assembly are listed below, with all being elected on 17 July, three weeks after the first session.

Committee	Chairperson	Parliamentary Group	Term start	Term End
Budget and Fiscal Policy	Bayram Bayram	DPS	17 July 2024	11 November 2024
Constitutional and Judicial questions	Anna Aleksandrova	GERB-SDS	17 July 2024	11 November 2024
Economy and Innovations	Petar Kanev	BSP for Bulgaria	17 July 2024	11 November 2024
Energy	Delyan Dobrev	GERB-SDS	17 July 2024	11 November 2024
Regional policy, development and local government	Andrey Tsekov	PP-DB	17 July 2024	11 November 2024
Foreign Affairs	Boyko Borisov	GERB-SDS	17 July 2024	11 November 2024
European Affairs and European finances	Kiril Petkov	PP-DB	17 July 2024	11 November 2024
Defense	Hristo Gadzhev	GERB-SDS	17 July 2024	11 November 2024
National Security and Internal Order	Manol Manev	GERB-SDS	17 July 2024	11 November 2024
Oversight over the Security Services, special surveillance tools and classified information	Daniel Mitov (Note: According to the rulebook of the Bulgarian parliament, the Chairman of the Security Services Committee is rotational, however in the 50th National Assembly the rotation did not take place.)	GERB-SDS	17 July 2024	11 November 2024
Agriculture, food and forestry	Ivan Ivanov	BSP for Bulgaria	17 July 2024	11 November 2024
Labour and Social Policy	Denitsa Sacheva	GERB-SDS	17 July 2024	11 November 2024
Education and Science	Silvi Kirilov	ITN	17 July 2024	11 November 2024
Youth and Sport	Kosta Stoyanov	Revival	17 July 2024	11 November 2024
Healthcare	Aleksandr Simidchiev	PP-DB	17 July 2024	11 November 2024
Environment and Water	Stanislav Atanasov	DPS	17 July 2024	11 November 2024
Transport and Communication	Halil Letifov	DPS	17 July 2024	11 November 2024
E-Governance and Informational Technologies	Bozhidar Bozhanov	PP-DB	17 July 2024	11 November 2024
Culture and Media	Angel Yanchev	Revival	17 July 2024	11 November 2024
Civic engagement and interactions with citizens	Stanislav Balabanov	ITN	17 July 2024	11 November 2024
Human Rights and Religious Freedom	Nadezhda Yordanova	PP-DB	17 July 2024	11 November 2024
Policies concerned with Bulgarians abroad	Angel Georgiev	Revival	17 July 2024	11 November 2024
Prevention of corruption	Georgi Georgiev	GERB-SDS	17 July 2024	11 November 2024
Tourism	Tsoncho Ganev	Revival	17 July 2024	11 November 2024
Demographic policies, children and families	Kostadin Kostadinov	Revival	17 July 2024	11 November 2024

=== Temporary parliamentary committees ===
Three temporary parliamentary committees were formed during the tenure of the 50th National Assembly.

==== Rulebook temporary committee ====
Traditionally, following the election of a speaker, a temporary committee is formed in order to review the parliament's rules. Anna Aleksandrova, from GERB, was elected with 129 votes, including the majority of GERB, DPS and Velichie MPs, as well as some MPs from PP-DB. The decision to support Anna Aleksandrova led to debates between Revival and Velichie MPs, with Revival accusing Velichie of covertly supporting GERB.

During debates about the rulebook, two proposals were made in order to not issue wages to MPs during the campaign period, as well as subject all MPs to drug tests. However, both ideas were ultimately rejected both in committee and by the plenary session.

==== Ivelin Mihaylov investigative committee ====
On 11 July, with 143 votes for, the parliament voted to form a commission to investigate potential financial crimes committed by Velichie founder and businessman, Ivelin Mihaylov. The motion to form the committee was presented by three former members of the Velichie Parliamentary Group.

During committee hearings, allegations of were heard of Mihaylov's role in various forms of financial misconduct, including: de-frauding investors, running a pyramid scheme, undertaking banking activity without a license and intimidating investors to avoid litigation. On the 24th of July, Caretaker Minister of the Interior, Kalin Stoyanov, was heard by the commission, revealing that the Ministry of Interior had begun investigating Mihaylov for financial crimes as early as 2019, however none of the cases had been prosecuted.

On 8 August, the report of the commission was officially presented before parliament, with it concluding that there was reasonable evidence of Mihaylov's participation in financial crimes such as money laundering and building a pyramid scheme. A classified part of the report was directed to the General Prosecutors Office.

==== Dospat investigative committee ====
On 1 August, a commission was formed to investigate whether the mayor of Dospat, Elin Radev, had abused his power and engaged in corrupt practices, with its tenure limited until the 1st of September. The commission's chairman was selected as Aleksandr Vulchev, from ITN.

The commission held a record-breaking seven-hour contiguous session, during which Dospat mayor, Elin Radev, members of the local administration, as well as supporters and opponents of the mayor were heard.

In early September, a report on the activity of the commission was officially prepared, however it was not adopted within the commission due to a boycott of the commission's activity by GERB. Despite this, a decision was taken by the National Assembly to send relevant information from the project-report to various law enforcement agencies.

==== Bozhanov-Evroto investigative committee ====
In addition to the above listed committees, the parliament voted to extend the work of the temporary committee from the 49th National Assembly investigating the assassination of suspected Bulgarian mafia member, Martin "The Notary" Bozhanov and the potential role of another suspected member of the Bulgarian mafia, Pepi Evroto, in it. The formation of the committee was supported by 117 votes, with 107 votes against coming from GERB and DPS. Former justice minister in the Petkov Government, Nadezhda Yordanova, was selected as the committees chairwoman. One of the most notable events in the committees activity was the unexpected appearance of DPS co-chairman, Delyan Peevski, to a hearing before the committee, which Peevski used in order to insinuate illegal activity from PP-DB. Members of the committee from PP-DB, in turn have accused GERB and DPS of obstructing the work of the committee. Ultimately, the committee did not produce a report on its activity by the end of the 50th National Assembly.

== Parliamentary groups ==
7 Parliamentary Groups were registered at the opening session of the 50th National Assembly.

=== GERB-SDS ===
Name of Group	Seats	
Name of Group	Opening Session	Dissolution
GERB—SDS	68 / 240	68 / 240

The parliamentary group's leadership was as follows:

Position	Name	Political Party	Term start	Term End
Parliamentary Group Chair	Boyko Borisov	GERB	20 June 2024	11 November 2024
Parliamentary Group Vice-Chair	Denitsa Sacheva	GERB	20 June 2024	11 November 2024
Parliamentary Group Vice-Chair	Raya Nazaryan	GERB	20 June 2024	11 November 2024
Parliamentary Group Vice-Chair	Temenuzhka Petkova	GERB	20 June 2024	11 November 2024
Parliamentary Group Vice-Chair	Rumen Hristov	SDS	20 June 2024	11 November 2024
Parliamentary Group Secretary	Aleksandar Nenkov	GERB	20 June 2024	11 November 2024

=== Group developments ===
The partisan breakdown of the seats within the parliamentary group is as follows.

Name of Party	Seats	
Name of Party	Opening Session	Dissolution
GERB	65 / 240	65 / 240
SDS	2 / 240	2 / 240
George's Day	1 / 240	1 / 240

The parliamentary group had no changes in its composition or leadership between the convocation and disbanding of the 50th National Assembly.

=== DPS ===
Name of Group	Seats	
Name of Group	Opening Session	Dissolution
DPS	47 / 240	22 / 240

The parliamentary group's leadership was as follows:

Position	Name	Political Party	Term start	Term End
Parliamentary Group Chair	Delyan Peevski	DPS (Note: Disputed since 8th August, 2024.)	20 June 2024	11 November 2024
Parliamentary Group Vice-chair	Erten Anisova	DPS	20 June 2024	11 November 2024
Parliamentary Group Vice-chair	Iskra Mihaylova	DPS	20 June 2024	11 November 2024
Parliamentary Group Vice-chair	Yordan Tsonev	DPS	20 June 2024	11 November 2024
Parliamentary Group Vice-chair	Halil Letifov	DPS	20 June 2024	11 November 2024
Parliamentary Group Vice-chair	Hamid Hamid	DPS	20 June 2024	11 November 2024
Parliamentary Group Vice-chair	Bayram Bayram	DPS	26 June 2024	11 November 2024
Parliamentary Group Secretary	Elvan Gyurkash	DPS	20 June 2024	11 November 2024

=== Parliamentary group developments ===
On 25 June, long-time DPS MP, Filiz Hyusmenova, resigned as an MP citing poor electoral results in her constituency of Varna She was replaced by MP-candidate Hyusni Hasan Adem.

On 27 June, first-time MP, Aysel Rufad, was expelled from the DPS Parliamentary Group, with no official reason being provided. On 3 July, long-time MP from Plovdiv-Province, Ramadan Atalay, was unanimously expelled from the DPS Parliamentary Group, after the province-leadership of the party removed their confidence from the MP due to a decrease in votes. Shortly thereafter, MP from Targovishte Province, Dzheyhan Ibryamov, was similarly expelled from the group due to a withdrawal of confidence by the province leadership.

On 11 July, 17 MPs in the group, including co-chairman Dzhevdet Chakarov, were expelled, in what was widely considered a by-product of the conflict between Parliamentary Group Chairman, Delyan Peevski, and DPS Honorary Chairman, Ahmed Dogan. Two MPs, Ahmed Vranchev and Dimitar Nikolov, left the DPS Parliamentary Group in solidarity with the expelled. Following the split of the group, 25 MPs remained in the official DPS Parliamentary Group.

On 12 July, two more DPS MPs, Myumum Myumum and Ibraim Zaydenov, left the parliamentary group in support of the expelled. Hyusni Adem, another DPS MP, left the group on the 17th of July.

By the end of the 50th National Assembly, the official DPS Parliamentary Group had only 22 members, with the majority of the original group sitting as independents.

=== PP-DB ===
Name of Group	Seats	
Name of Group	Opening Session	Dissolution
PP-DB	39 / 240	39 / 240

The parliamentary group's leadership is as follows:

Position	Name	Political Party	Term start	Term End
Parliamentary Group Chair	Nikolay Denkov	PP	20 June 2024	11 November 2024
Parliamentary Group Vice-chair	Bozhidar Bozhanov	Yes, Bulgaria!	20 June 2024	11 November 2024
Parliamentary Group Vice-chair	Kalina Konstantinova	PP	20 June 2024	11 November 2024
Parliamentary Group Vice-chair	Lyudmila Ilieva	DSB	20 June 2024	11 November 2024
Parliamentary Group Vice-chair	Stoyu Stoev	PP	20 June 2024	11 November 2024
Parliamentary Group Secretary	Tatyana Sultanova-Siveva	PP	20 June 2024	11 November 2024

==== Parliamentary group developments ====
The partisan breakdown of the Parliamentary Group was as follows:

Party	Seats	
Party	Opening Session	Dissolution
PP & affiliated independents	22 / 240	22 / 240
Yes, Bulgaria!	10 / 240	9 / 240
DSB	8 / 240	9 / 240

Leader of Yes, Bulgaria!, Hristo Ivanov, announced shortly after the election results that he would resign as an MP in the next parliament. After being sworn in, Ivanov resigned on 21 June. He was replaced by Stoyan Mihalev, a member of DSB, who was sworn in on 26 June.

=== Revival ===
Name of Group	Seats	
Name of Group	Opening Session	Dissolution
Revival	38 / 240	38 / 240

The parliamentary group's leadership was as follows:

Position	Name	Political Party	Term start	Term End
Parliamentary Group Chair	Kostadin Kostadinov	Revival	20 June 2024	11 November 2024
Parliamentary Group Vice-chair	Petar Petrov	Revival	20 June 2024	11 November 2024
Parliamentary Group Secretary	Iskra Mihaylova	Revival	20 June 2024	11 November 2024

=== BSP for Bulgaria ===
Name of Group	Seats	
Name of Group	Opening Session	Dissolution
BSP for Bulgaria	19 / 240	18 / 240

The parliamentary group's leadership was as follows:

Position	Name	Political Party	Term start	Term End
Parliamentary Group Chair	Borislav Gutsanov	BSP	20 June 2024	11 November 2024
Parliamentary Group Vice-chair	Ivan Ivanov	BSP	20 June 2024	11 November 2024
Parliamentary Group Secretary	Deyan Dechev	BSP	20 June 2024	11 November 2024
Parliamentary Group Secretary	Ivan Petkov	BSP	20 June 2024	11 November 2024

==== Parliamentary group developments ====
Party	Seats	
Party	Opening Session	Dissolution
BSP	18 / 240	14 / 240
Independents	1 / 240	3 / 240

Prior to the convocation of the parliament, there was confusion about who the Chairman of the BSP for Bulgaria parliamentary group would be. On 14 June, an announcement was made that the group would be led by Aleksandr Svilenski, after a vote by the "political council" of the BSP for Bulgaria coalition. This decision was contested by the BSP National Council, which voted to appoint Borislav Gutsanov head of the parliamentary group on 15 June. Gutsanov's election was confirmed on 20 June following a vote by the Parliamentary Group.

On the first day of the newly convened parliament, the BSP for Bulgaria parliamentary group expelled Kaloyan Metodiev, who the National Council had requested resign his seat, due to him receiving the seat in violation of a previous National Council decision. Thus Kaloyan Metodiev was the first independent MP in the new National Assembly.

On 4 September, long-time BPS MP, Mikhail Stavrev, resigned from the parliamentary group following the decision to expel Korneliya Ninova and other pro-Ninova politicians.

Despite the expulsion of Ninonva, Svilenski and Chenchev from the Bulgarian Socialist Party, they continued to sit with the BSP for Bulgaria Parliamentary Group until the disbandment of the 50th National Assembly.

=== ITN ===
Name of Group	Seats	
Name of Group	Opening Session	Dissolution
ITN	16 / 240	16 / 240

The parliamentary group's leadership was as follows:

Position	Name	Political Party	Term start	Term End
Parliamentary Group Chair	Toshko Yordanov	ITN	20 June 2024	11 November 2024
Parliamentary Group Vice-chair	Stanislav Balabanov	ITN	20 June 2024	11 November 2024
Parliamentary Group Secretary	Ivaylo Kostadinov	ITN	20 June 2024	11 November 2024
Parliamentary Group Secretary	Stanislav Bogdanski	ITN	20 June 2024	11 November 2024

=== Velichie ===
Name of Group	Seats	
Name of Group	Opening Session	Dissolution
Velichie	13 / 240	0 / 240

The parliamentary group's leadership was as follows:

Position	Name	Political Party	Term start	Term End
Parliamentary Group Chair	Nikolay Markov	Velichie (Note: Nikolay Markov's status as a party member of Velichie is disputed.)	20 June 2024	5 July 2024 (Note: Parliamentary Group automatically dissolved on the 5th of July.)
Parliamentary Group Vice-chair	Darin Georgiev	Velichie	20 June 2024	5 July 2024
Parliamentary Group Vice-chair	Georgi Kukov	Velichie (Note: Georgi Kukov's formal membership in Velichie has not been confirmed.)	20 June 2024	5 July 2024
Parliamentary Group Secretary	Irena Neginova	Velichie	20 June 2024	5 July 2024

==== Parliamentary Group developments ====
A conflict emerged between the parties founder, Ivelin Mihaylov, and Parliamentary Group Chairman, Nikolay Markov, which led the Central Council of Velichie to withdraw its confidence from the group's leadership.

On 5 July, 6 MPs from the Velichie Parliamentary Group officially announced their intention to leave it, thus dissolving the group. The MPs, in a briefing to the press, justified their decision due to a loss of confidence in the Parliamentary Group leadership. The MPs claimed that they had attempted to remove the current leadership, however their efforts proved unsuccessful due to obstruction by the leadership.

== Legislative activity and other notable developments ==
=== Zhelyazkov cabinet investiture vote ===
On 1 July, as part of the government-formation procedure, Zhelyazkov, as the PM-Candidate from GERB officially received the first mandate and submitted his project-cabinet. The debate for the investiture of the cabinet was scheduled for 13:00, on 3 July.

The candidacy of Zhelyazkov for PM was introduced to the parliament by GERB-SDS parliamentary group vice-chair, Temenuzhka Petkova, which was followed by Zhelayzkov introducing the personal composition of the project cabinet.

Zhelyazkov's speech was followed by a statement by former Prime Minister and PP-DB parliamentary group chairman, Nikolai Denkov, who chastised Zhelyazkov for not consulting other political forces in the negotiation process and for nominating candidate-Ministers who lacked the necessary acumen to lead Bulgaria forward.

During the debate about the government's investiture, GERB-SDS parliamentary group Chairman Boyko Borisov made a short statement addressed towards PP co-leader Kiril Petkov, hearkening to the shared responsibility the two parties held for the Denkov Government. Kiril Petkov, in response, demanded that Borisov show genuine interest in cooperation and apologise for his alleged role in the collapse of the Denkov and Petkov Government.

The debate was generally dominated by mutual allegations and attacks between representatives of the PP-DB and GERB-SDS parliamentary groups.

Ultimately, the Zhelyazkov government failed in its investiture vote, receiving 98 votes in favour.

Investiture; Rosen Zhelyazkov (GERB)
Ballot →	3 July 2024
Required majority →	120 of 240
Yes: • GERB–SDS (68); • DPS (30)	98 / 240
No: • PP–DB (38); • VAZ (38); • BSPzB (17); • ITN (16); • DPS (14); • Velichie (13); • Independent (2)	138 / 240
Abstentions: • DPS (1); • PP–DB (1)	2 / 240
Absentees: • DPS (1); • BSPzB (1)	2 / 240
Result →	No

=== 'Political nomadism' debate & committee distribution ===
By early July, a high number of unaffiliated MPs had appeared in the parliament due to internal developments within the individual parliamentary groups.

On 12 July, during debates about the parliament's rulebook in the National Assembly, BSP MP, Aleksandr Svilenski, proposed the removal of a clause prohibiting the formation of new parliamentary groupings by unaffiliated MPs or the entrance of an MP into a new parliamentary group (commonly known as "political nomadism"). Svilenski justified the legislative change by citing the high number of unaffiliated MPs and the possible obstructions to the functioning of the parliament due to the restrictions on the activity of unaffiliated MPs (such as less opportunities to participate in parliamentary committees). The proposed changes were however, ultimately rejected due to opposition from most of the other parliamentary parties.

Ultimately, none of the unaffiliated MPs were given a place in the distribution of the committees.

=== Economic legislation ===
During its tenure, specifically prior to the summer vacation, the parliament passed a number of important economic legislation.

==== Social Security reform bill ====
On 11 July, the GERB-SDS parliamentary group proposed a bill that was meant to alter certain aspects of the current unemployment benefit scheme and extend paternity leave.

The latter part of the bill, concerning the extension of paternity leave even without the mother's approval, was passed unanimously on 25 July. The second part of the legislative package, which aimed to end the practice by which unemployed persons, who had been employed even on a temporary basis in another EU country, qualified for the highest possible unemployment benefit, proved more contentious, being opposed by DPS.

Ultimately, the legislation ending the practice passed with 157 votes for and 11 against. Independent MPs affiliated with Ahmed Dogan called on President Radev to veto the bill.

==== Introduction of the Euro bill ====
On 7 August, the parliament adopted the "Law for the Adoption of the Euro" which had been developed jointly by the European Central Bank and Bulgarian National Bank. The law regulated the way in which the Euro was to be introduced in Bulgaria, and made provisions for potential malpractices by shopkeepers. It was seen as an important step in preparing the grounds for Bulgaria's membership in the Eurozone.

The law was supported by the groups of GERB-SDS, PP-DB and DPS, with Revival voting against, while BSP and ITN largely abstained.

==== Amendments to the state budget ====
Two amendments to the state budget were proposed by the Ministry of Finance to the National Assembly, both of which were related to greater municipal spending requirements.

On 24 July, the parliament voted to authorise the extension of funding to 271 new municipal projects, thus increasing the spending in the budget by 308 million Leva. The amendment was supported unanimously.

In late September, the parliament also once again voted to increase the budget for municipal projects, after approving the commencement of 349 new municipal projects.

=== Anti-LGBTQ+ propaganda law ===
On 7 August, the parliament passed a new law banning the propagation of "non-traditional sexual orientations" in school. The bill, originally written and proposed by Revival, gained the support of GERB-SDS, DPS, BSP and ITN.

The passing of the bill was accompanied by protests from its opponents, as well as fears of potential retaliation from European institutions.

=== Energy law amendments ===
In the final day of the National Assembly prior to its suspension for the election campaign period, the parliament was set to debate a number of amendments to the Energy Law mandated by the EU Plan for Recovery and Resilience, including plans to liberalise the Bulgarian energy market by 2026 and the approval of a road-map for the closing of coal power-plants in Stara Zagora province.

The debate on the amendments was opposed by Revival, BSP and ITN, who believed that it was intentionally rushed by the GERB-PPDB-DPS majority in order to reduce its societal resonance. The political parties supporting the amendments cited the urgency of passing them for Bulgaria to receive funding from the EU.

The three parties opposed to the amendment initially attempted to disrupt the plenary session discussing them by lowering the quorum, however this did not end up working due to the eventual formation of a quorum at 9 PM. Consequently, representatives from the Revival and ITN groups occupied the tribune of the National Assembly, citing perceived rules violations in the conduct of the session. They further attempted to disrupt the National Assemblies audio systems after attempts by GERB MPs to speak from their place.

At 10 PM, the session was temporarily suspended by Vice-Speaker Rositsa Kirova, with most MPs belonging to the GERB-SDS, PP-DB and DPS Parliamentary Groups leaving the room.

Members from ITN and Revival continued to occupy the tribune, claiming that MPs from the supporting parties planned to return and vote on the amendments when the room had been vacated.

At 23:00, the quorum was verified by Kirova, who, following the registration of only 9 MPs, officially dissolved the session. Shortly thereafter, the light system in the National Assembly was turned off. Revival and ITN MPs remained in the room until 00:00, with the official suspension of parliament for the election campaign period.

The behaviour of the MPs was widely condemned by PP-DB and GERB, who accused them of preventing Bulgaria's fulfilment of important energy laws and of demonstrating anti-European practices. ITN and Revival representatives, for their part, claimed to have saved thousands of jobs in the Maritsa basin.
