= Ventsislav Varbanov =

Bulgarian politician

- Венцислав Върбанов

Minister for Agriculture, Food and Forestry
- In office 21 May 1997 – 24 July 2001
- Prime Minister: Ivan Kostov

Member of the National Assembly
- In office 24 February 2010 – 14 March 2013
- Constituency: 8th MMC – Dobrich
- In office 5 July 2001 – 7 October 2009
- Constituency: MMC – Pleven (2001-2009); MMC – Dobrich (2009)
- In office 7 May 1997 – 24 May 1997

Chairman of the Bulgarian Agricultural Producers Association
- Incumbent
- Assumed office 2014

Mayor of Dolni Dabnik
- In office 1991 – 7 May 1997

Personal details
- Born: 16 April 1962 (age 64) Dolni Dabnik, Pleven Province, Bulgaria
- Party: Independent
- Other political affiliations: United Agrarians (2006-2010); BZNS-NS (until 2006)
- Profession: Politician, agriculturalist

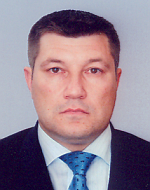
Varbanov’s portrait for the National Assembly of Bulgaria

Ventsislav Vasilev Varbanov (Bulgarian: Венцислав Василев Върбанов; born 16 April 1962) is a Bulgarian politician who served as Minister of Agriculture, Forestry and Agrarian Reform in the Kostov government between 1997 and 2001.

Since 2014, he has been the chairman of the Association of Agricultural Producers (Bulgarian: Асоциация на земеделските производители) in Bulgaria.

== Life ==
Kraus was born in Dolni Dabnik and studied at the Higher Institute of Zootechnics and Veterinary Medicine in Stara Zagora, specializing in zoo engineering.

Member of Bulgarian parliament between 2001 — 2009 (39th National Assembly; 40th National Assembly; 41st National Assembly) and again from 2010 to 2013 (41st National Assembly).

Between 1991 and 1997, he served as mayor of the Dolni Dabnik municipality.
