= 8th MMC – Dobrich =

Bulgarian constituency

Coordinates: 43°35′N 28°0′E

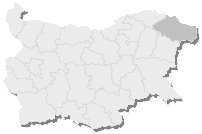
Map of Bulgaria, 8th MMC – Dobrich is highlighted

8th Multi-member Constituency – Dobrich is a constituency whose borders are the same as Dobrich Province in Bulgaria.

== Background ==
In the 2009 Bulgarian parliamentary election, 8th Multi-member Constituency – Dobrich elected 7 members to the Bulgarian National Assembly, 6 of which were through proportionality vote and 1 was through first-past-the-post voting.

== Members in the Bulgarian National Assembly ==
Below are all the MPs who have served from Dobrich Constituency.

=== 2005 ===
Proportional representation
Date Elected	Member	Party
2005	Nikolay Kamov	KB (Note: Completed his term as an independent MP)
2005	Yasen Penchev (Note: Resigned as an MP in December, 2007, remained of term served by Nikola Prodanov)	KB
2005	Evtim Kostadinov (Note: Resigned as an MP in April, 2007, remained of term served by Siyana Fudulova)	KB
2005	Daniel Vulchev (Note: Resigned his seat in August, 2005, rest of the term served out by Mima Vasileva)	NDSV
2005	Encho Malev	NDSV (Note: Joined the Bulgarian New Democracy Parliamentary Group in 2008)
2005	Stancho Todorov	ATAKA (Note: Left the ATAKA Parliamentary Group from June, 2005, and served the rest of his term as an independent)
2005	Nihat Kabil (Note: Resigned shortly after being elected, with Yerdinch Hadzhiev serving as MP until 2008, when Hadzhiev resigned and was replaced by Kabil, who served out the rest of the term.)	DPS

=== 2009 ===
- Through first-past-the-post voting

First Elected	Member	Party
2009	Rumen Ivanov	GERB

- Through proportionality vote

First Elected	Member	Party
2009	Svetomir Mihaylov	GERB
2009	Vanya Georgieva (Note: Resigned in October of 2012, with the rest of her term served out by Todor Georgiev.)	GERB
2009	Petar Dimitrov	KB
2009	Korman Ismailov	DPS (Note: Completed his term as an independent after leaving the DPS Parliamentary Group in 2011.)
2009	Valentin Ivanov	ATAKA (Note: Completed his term as an independent after leaving the ATAKA Parliamentary Group in 2011.)
2009	Ventsislav Varbanov	Blue Coalition (Note: Completed his term as an independent after leaving the Blue Coalition Parliamentary Group in 2009.)

=== 2013 ===
First Elected	Member	Party
2009	Rumen Ivanov	GERB
2013	Zhelyazko Zhelyazkov	GERB
2013	Yavor Gechev (Note: Resigned in July of 2013, with the rest of his term served out by Plamen Zhelyazkov.)	KB
2013	Siyana Fudulova	KB
2013	Rushen Riza	DPS
2013	Nikolay Aleksandrov	ATAKA

=== 2014 ===
First Elected	Member	Party
2009	Rumen Ivanov	GERB
2014	Zhivko Martinov	GERB
2013	Rushen Riza	DPS
2014	Svetla Bacharova	BSP for a Left Bulgaria
2014	Valentin Nikolov	PF
2014	Ivan Stankov	ABV

=== 2017 ===
First Elected	Member	Party
2017	Daniel Yordanov	BSPzB
2017	Krasimir Yankov	BSPzB (Note: Finished his term as an independent MP)
2014	Zhivko Martinov (Note: Resigned as an MP in 2017, with the rest of the term served out by Daniela Dimitrova)	GERB
2017	Plamen Manushev	GERB
2017	Hasen Ademov	DPS
2017	Yordan Yordanov	United Patriots

=== 2021 (April) ===
First Elected	Member	Party
2021	Denitsa Sacheva (Note: Resigned before taking up her seat to complete her term as a Minister in the Third Borisov Government, with the term being served out by Zornitsa Mihaylova)	GERB-SDS
2021	Krasimir Nikolov	GERB-SDS
2021	Maya Dimitrova	BSPzB
2021	Dilyan Gospodinov	ITN
2017	Hasen Ademov	DPS
2021	Albena Simeonova	DB

=== 2021 (July) ===
First Elected	Member	Party
2021	Dilyan Gospodov	ITN
2021	Ivaylo Hristov	ITN
2021	Denitsa Sacheva	GERB-SDS
2021	Maya Dimitrova	BSPzB
2017	Hasen Ademov	DPS
2021	Albena Simeonova	DB

=== 2021 (November) ===
First Elected	Member	Party
2021	Yordanka Kostadinova	PP
2021	Galina Sabeva	PP
2021	Denitsa Sacheva	GERB-SDS
2021	Maya Dimitrova	BSPzB
2017	Hasen Ademov	DPS
2021	Ivaylo Hristov	ITN

=== 2022 ===
First Elected	Member	Party
2021	Denitsa Sacheva	GERB-SDS
2021	Yordanka Kostadinova	PP
2022	Erten Anisova	DPS
2021	Maya Dimitrova	BSPzB
2022	Konstantina Petrova	Revival
2022	Albena Simeonova	DB

=== 2023 ===
First Elected	Member	Party
2021	Denitsa Sacheva	GERB-SDS
2023	Ivaylo Mirchev	PP-DB
2022	Konstantina Petrova	Revival
2021	Maya Dimitrova	BSPzB
2022	Erten Anisova	DPS

=== 2024 (June) ===
First Elected	Member	Party
2021	Denitsa Sacheva	GERB-SDS
2022	Erten Anisova	DPS
2022	Konstantina Petrova	Revival
2021	Maya Dimitrova	BSPzB
2024	Aleksandr Aleksandrov	ITN

=== 2024 (October) ===
First Elected	Member	Party
2021	Denitsa Sacheva	GERB-SDS
2022	Konstantina Petrova	Revival
2021	Maya Dimitrova	BSP - OL
2022	Erten Anisova	DPS - NN
2024	Svilen Trifonov	PP-DB

== Elections ==
=== 2005 election ===
Party	Votes	%	Seats
Coalition for Bulgaria	35,478	35.47	3
NDSV	21,457	21.45	2
Movement for Rights and Freedoms	14,058	14.05	1
ATAKA	7,748	7.75	1
ODS	5,955	5.95	0
DSB	4,002	4.00	0
"New Time"	3,111	3.11	0
"Coalition of the Rose"	1,143	1.14	0
Others	7,090	7.08	0

=== 2009 election ===
- MMC vote

Party	Votes	%	Change	Seats	Change	
Citizens for European Development of Bulgaria						
Coalition for Bulgaria						
Movement for Rights and Freedoms						
National Union Attack						
National Movement for Stability and Progress						
Blue Coalition						
Lider (Bulgaria)						
Order, Lawfulness, Justice						
Others				—		—
Total-Valid				'—		
Invalid			—	—	—	—
Total Turnout			—	—	—	—

- single-district constituency

Party	Candidate	Votes	%
Citizens for European Development of Bulgaria	Rumen Ivanov	40349	40.17
Coalition for Bulgaria	Rosen Karadimov	28655	28.53
National Union Attack	Valentin Ivanov	14017	13.96
Blue Coalition	Ventsislav Varbanov	5180	5.16
Leader	Kliment Naidenov	4398	4.38
Order, Lawfulness, Justice	Evgeni Sachev	3454	3.44
National Movement for Stability and Progress	Miglena Tacheva	2829	2.82
Greens	Yuliya Yordanova	441	0.44
Union of Patriotic Forces "Defense"	Kiriyak Tsonev	416	0.41
National Movement to Save the Fatherland	Bozhan Peychev	352	0.35
Bulgarian Left Coalition	Iliyana Zahariyeva	188	0.19
Bulgarian National Union – New Democracy	Detelin Kyukirchev	114	0.11
Total		100439	100

== See also ==
- 2009 Bulgarian parliamentary election
- Politics of Bulgaria
- List of Bulgarian Constituencies
