= Vasil Chichibaba =

Bulgarian politician (born 1935)

Personal details
- Born: Vasil Dimitrov Chichibaba; 26 January 1935 Barakovo, Kingdom of Bulgaria
- Died: 8 December 2013 (aged 78) Sofia, Bulgaria
- Party: BANU
- Profession: Agronomist, politician, scientist

Vasil Dimitrov Chichibaba (Bulgarian: Васил Димитров Чичибаба) was a Bulgarian scientist, agronomist and politician. He was a member of the left-wing party Agrarian Union "Aleksandar Stamboliyski", and former chairman at the Agricultural Academy in Sofia, Bulgaria.

== Biography ==
Chichibaba was born in Barakovo on 26 January 1935. His father was of Ukrainian descent. He graduated from the Higher Agricultural Institute in Sofia in 1958. After he graduated from school, he worked as a zootechnician in the villages of Chapaevo, Strazhitsa, and Simeonovo.

In 1966, he specialized in genetics and aviculture in Czechoslovakia. In 1969, he became a member of BANU. Between 1973 and 1978, he was the Scientific Secretary at the Institute of Aviculture in Kostinbrod. In 1977, he became a PhD in agricultural sciences and a senior scientist at the Hybrid Center of Aviculture in Kostinbrod.

Between 1978 and 1982, he was director of the Aviculture Research and Production Association at Kostinbrod. In 1989, he was an academician at the Bulgarian Academy of Sciences. In 1982, he became the Vice President at the Agricultural Academy in Sofia, and in 1992, he became chairman.

Vasil Chichibaba was Minister of Agriculture and Food Industry between 1995 and 1996 during the government of Jean Videnov, but later resigned.

He died on 8 December 2013.
