= Georgi Gvozdeykov =

Bulgarian politician (born 1976)

- Георги Гвоздейков
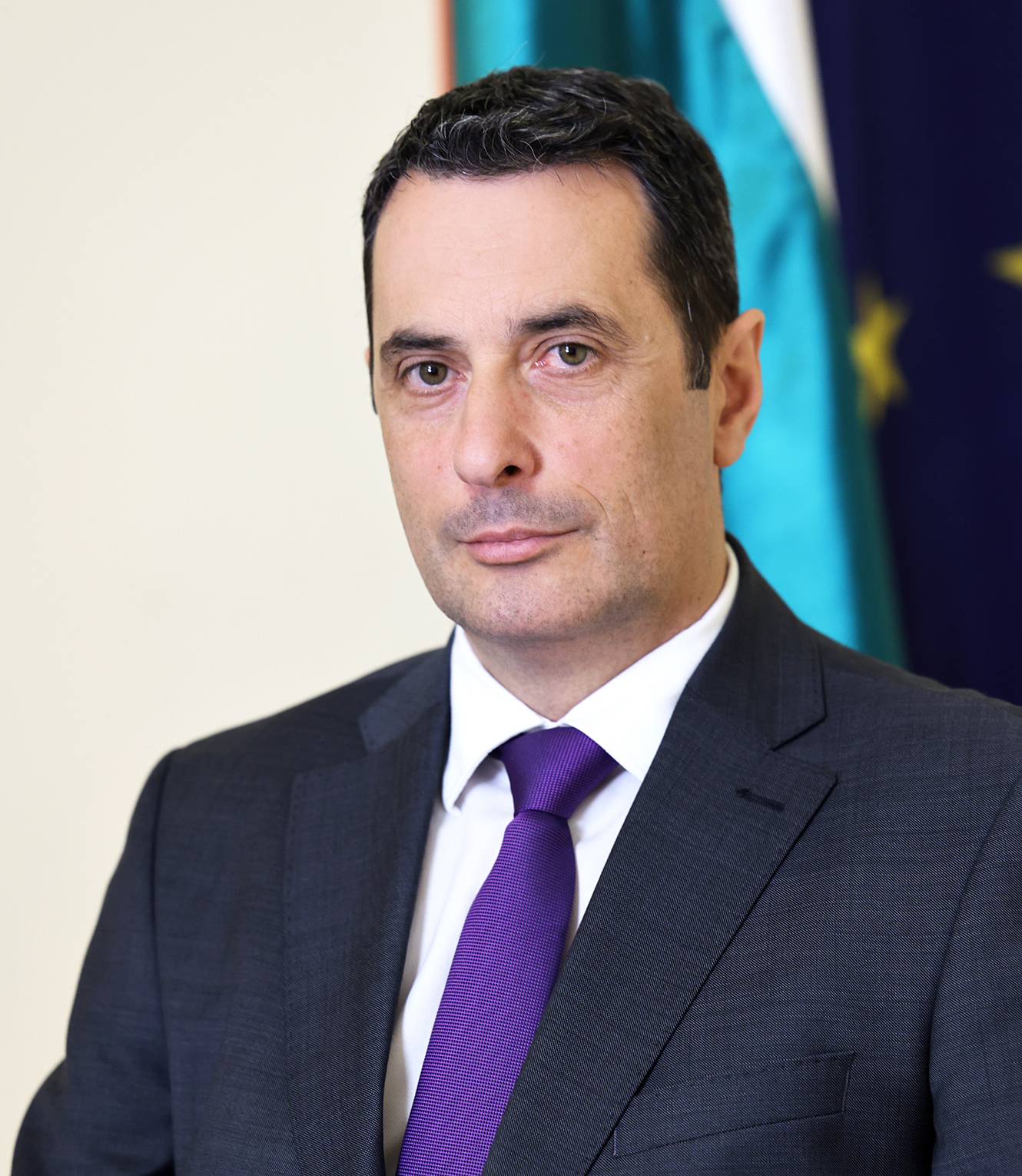
- Official portrait, 2021

Minister of Transport and Communications
- In office 6 June 2023 – 27 August 2024
- Prime Minister: Nikolai Denkov; Dimitar Glavchev
- Preceded by: Hristo Alexiev
- Succeeded by: Krasimira Stoyanova

Member of the National Assembly
- In office 3 December 2021 – 20 July 2022
- Constituency: 21st MMC - Sliven

Personal details
- Born: Georgi Yordanov Gvozdeykov; 16 June 1976 (age 50) Tvarditsa, PR Bulgaria
- Party: Independent (since 2024)
- Other political affiliations: We Continue the Change (until 2024)
- Education: Georgi Benkovski Air Force Academy
- Occupation: Politician; engineer

Georgi Yordanov Gvozdeykov (Bulgarian: Георги Йорданов Гвоздейков; born June 16, 1976) is a Bulgarian politician who is the current Minister of Transport and Communications. A political independent, he was previously a member of the PP party from 2021 to 2024 and a Member of the National Assembly from 2021 to 2022.

Gvozdeykov was expelled from the PP party following his decision to remain as Minister of Transport and Communications in the caretaker Glavchev Government, which succeeded the PP-led Denkov Government, without party approval. Gvozdeykov justified his move with the urgency of government continuity regarding a railway deal with the German Deutsche Bahn.

On the 26th of August it was announced that Gvozdeykov would not be re-appointed to the Second Glavchev Government, and instead would be replaced by Krasimira Stoyanova as Caretaker Minister of Transport. Subsequently, Gvozdeykov announced that he was ceasing his participation in politics.
