= Angelina Boneva =

Bulgarian economist and politician

- Ангелина Бонева

Acting Minister of Regional Development and Public Works
- In office 19 February 2026 – 8 May 2026
- Prime Minister: Andrey Gurov
- Preceded by: Ivan Ivanov
- Succeeded by: Ivan Shishkov

Personal details
- Education: Oxford University; University of Graz; École nationale d'administration

Angelina Boneva (Bulgarian: Ангелина Бонева) is a Bulgarian economist and politician who served as acting Minister of Regional Development and Public Works of Bulgaria in 2026. She previously served as Deputy Minister of Regional Development and Public Works in 2023.

== Education ==
Boneva obtained a degree in economics from the Oxford University and a master's degree European studies from the University of Graz, Austria, and has interned at the Council of the European Union and obtained a specialisation at the École nationale d'administration in Paris.

== Career ==
She has extensive experience in the public management of European programmes and European funds for regional development. Since 2022 she has been the Director General of Strategic Planning and Regional Development Programmes of the Ministry of Regional Development and Public Works of Bulgaria and of the Authority of the Operationals Programmes of "Regional Development" (2021–2027) and "Regions in Growth" (2014–2020).

She worked at the Ministry of Finance, where Boneva was responsible for the development of European programmes, and was part of the Ministry's team that worked with the European Commission to prepare the National Strategic Reference Framework for the period 2007–2013, which enabled Bulgaria to receive its first European funds as a European Union Member State.

In April 2023, she became Deputy Minister of Regional Development and Public Works. During her term in office she developed, among other projects, the nationwide renovation of apartment blocks.

On 18 February 2026 Boneva was announced as the new Minister of Regional Development and Public Works of the caretaker cabinet of Prime Minister Andrey Gurov and was sworn in on 19 February 2026.
