= Erten Anisova =

Bulgarian politician (born 1990)

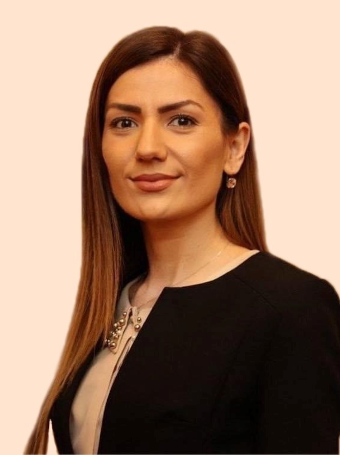
- Anisova in 2023

Member of the National Assembly
- Incumbent
- Assumed office 19 October 2022
- Constituency: Dobrich

Personal details
- Born: 25 April 1990 (age 35)
- Party: DPS – A New Beginning (since 2024); Movement for Rights and Freedoms

Erten Belginova Anisova (Bulgarian: Ертен Белгинова Анисова; born 25 April 1990) is a Bulgarian politician serving as a member of the National Assembly since 2022. From 2023 to 2024, she was a member of the Parliamentary Assembly of the Council of Europe.
