= Anna Aleksandrova (politician) =

Bulgarian politician (born 1972)

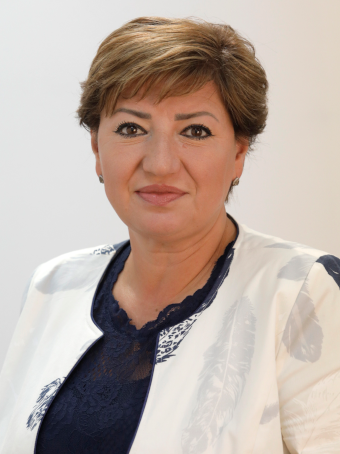
- Aleksandrova in 2021

Member of the National Assembly
- Incumbent
- Assumed office 12 November 2014
- Constituency: 25th MMC

Personal details
- Born: 25 February 1972 (age 54)
- Party: GERB

Anna Vasileva Aleksandrova (Bulgarian: Анна Василева Александрова; born 25 February 1972) is a Bulgarian politician serving as a member of the National Assembly since 2014. She previously served as deputy mayor of Nadezhda.
