= Angel Georgiev =

Bulgarian politician (born 1988)

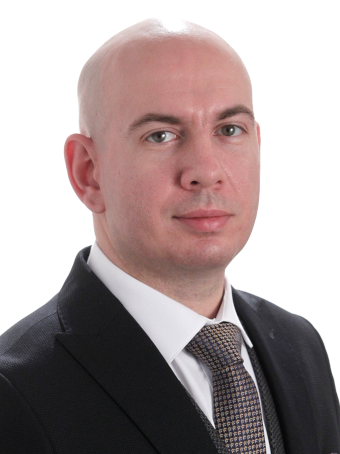
- Georgiev in 2021

Member of the National Assembly
- Incumbent
- Assumed office 3 December 2021
- Constituency: Plovdiv Province (2021–2022); Plovdiv City (2022–present)

Personal details
- Born: 8 April 1988 (age 38)
- Party: Revival

Angel Zhekov Georgiev (Bulgarian: Ангел Жеков Георгиев; born 8 April 1988) is a Bulgarian politician of Revival serving as a member of the National Assembly since 2021. In 2024, he served as chairman of the committee on policies for Bulgarians abroad.
