= Galya Kondeva =

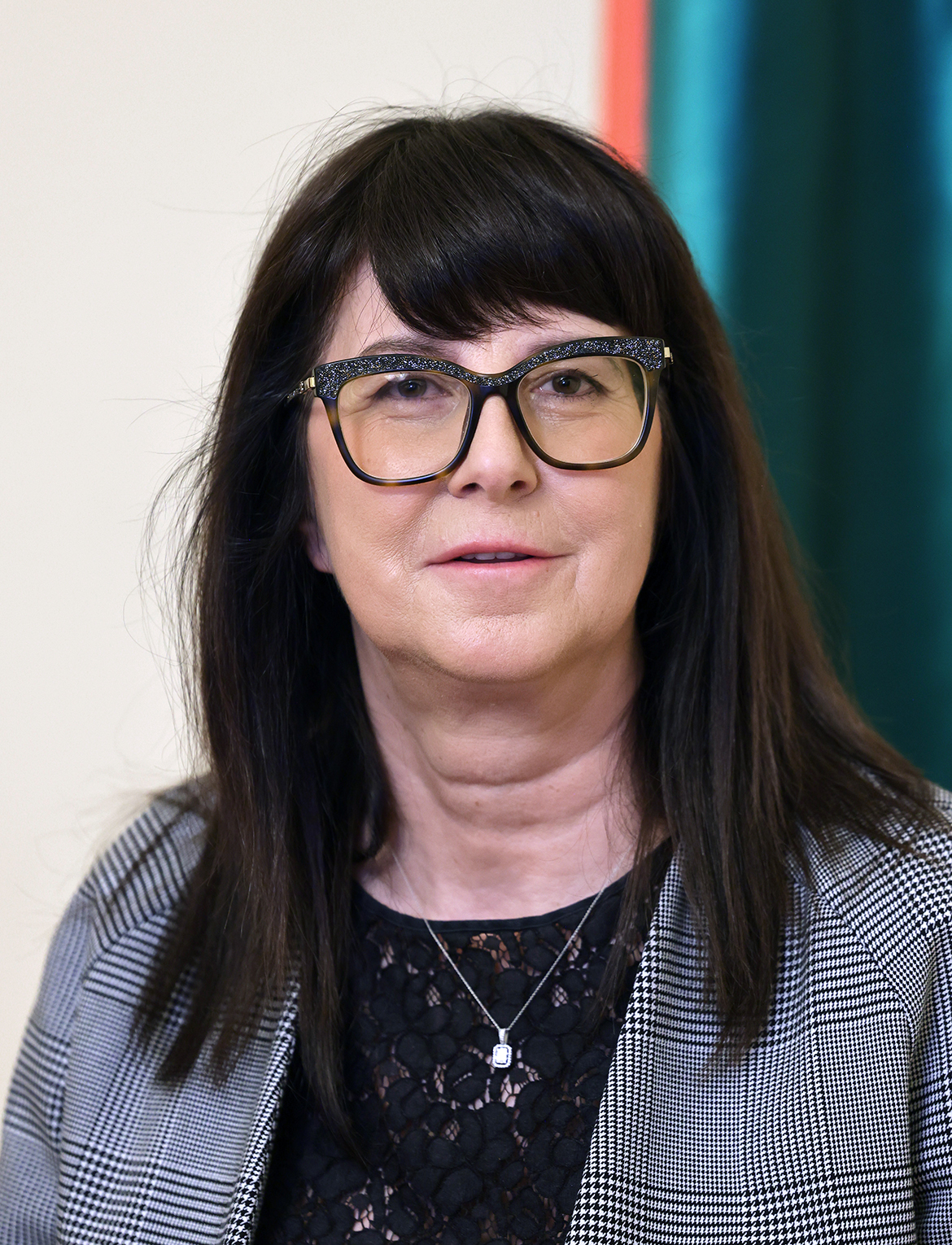
Galya Kondeva

Galya Kondeva (Bulgarian: Галя Георгиева Кондева-Мънкова; born 24 December 1963) is a Bulgarian physician and civil servant. Since April 2024 she is the Minister of Health for Bulgaria. She previously worked in hospitals in Sofia, in medical management. She is a specialist in internal medicine and clinical haematology.

== Life ==
Galya Kondeva graduated in medicine in 1987. She specialized in internal medicine and clinical haematology. She also earned a degree in medical management. She is a member of the Bulgarian Medication Association, and has worked in the Pirogov emergency hospital, Vita Hospital, and Acibadem Tokuda hospital in Sofia. From 2003 she spent five years leading a department at the National Health Insurance Fund (NHIF). From 2017 to 2018 she was a NHIF director.

She is serving as the minister of health in the Glavchev Government since 9 April 2024, having previously served two terms as acting minister for health. at the start of her second period as acting minister, she stated priorities for the country were to resolve longstanding issues with healthcare staffing, particularly in nursing, and to continue work on the National Health Programme and the construction of a new National Children's Hospital, "Mama and I". Kondeva faced criticism for decision to build the hospital as a private hospital, but claimed that she had not been lobbied over the decision. In August 2024 she discussed with the Israeli ambassador Yossi Levi Sfari the signing of a possible agreement with the Israeli Ministries of Health on maternal and child healthcare.
