= Denitsa Sacheva =

Bulgarian politician (born 1973)

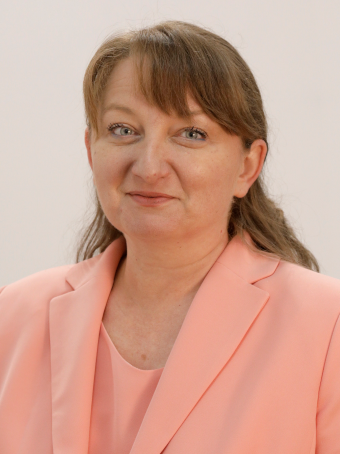
- Sacheva in 2021

Member of the National Assembly
- Incumbent
- Assumed office 21 July 2021
- Constituency: Dobrich

Minister of Labor and Social Policy
- In office 3 December 2019 – 12 May 2021
- Prime Minister: Boyko Borisov
- Preceded by: Biser Petkov
- Succeeded by: Galab Donev

Personal details
- Born: 2 November 1973 (age 52)
- Party: GERB

Denitsa Evgenieva Sacheva (Bulgarian: Деница Евгениева Сачева; born 2 November 1973) is a Bulgarian politician serving as a member of the National Assembly since 2021. From 2019 to 2021, she served as minister of labor and social policy.
