= Ivan Ivanov (politician, born 1975) =

Bulgarian politician (born 1975)

- Иван Иванов
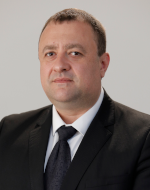
- Ivanov in 2021

Minister of Regional Development and Public Works
- In office 16 January 2025 – 19 February 2026
- Prime Minister: Rosen Zhelyazkov
- Preceded by: Violeta Koritarova
- Succeeded by: Angelina Boneva

Member of the National Assembly
- Incumbent
- Assumed office 19 October 2022
- Constituency: Ruse
- In office 21 May 2013 – 13 December 2021
- Constituency: Shaman

Minister of Agriculture and Food
- In office 13 December 2021 – 2 August 2022
- Prime Minister: Kiril Petkov
- Preceded by: Hristo Bozoukov
- Succeeded by: Yavor Gechev

Personal details
- Born: 13 August 1975 (age 50)
- Party: Bulgarian Socialist Party

Ivan Valentinov Ivanov (Bulgarian: Иван Валентинов Иванов; born 13 August 1975) is a Bulgarian politician. He has been a member of the National Assembly since 2022, having previously served from 2013 to 2021. From 2021 to 2022, he served as minister of agriculture and food.
