= Agricultural Academy =

Agricultural academy in Sofia, Bulgaria

Coordinates: 42.6972°N 23.2639°E

- Селскостопанска академия
- Established: 1961
- Location: Sofia, Bulgaria
- Website: agriacad.bg

The Agricultural Academy (Bulgarian: Селскостопанска академия) is an organization with headquarters in Sofia, Bulgaria, for scientific research, for applied, service and support activities in the field of agriculture, animal husbandry, food industry.

It has the right to prepare doctoral students in the relevant scientific disciplines. In the past, from 1971 to 1975, the academy was a higher school, teaching undergraduate and postgraduate students.

== History ==
It was created under the name Academy of Agricultural Sciences (AAS) in 1961, after the model of VASKhNIL academy in Moscow. AAS was closed in 1971, while its researchers moved to the Bulgarian Academy of Sciences.

In 1971 a new higher school was established under the name Georgi Dimitrov Agricultural Academy (GAAA). It united the scientific AAS with the higher schools in the country, preparing specialists in the mentioned fields of science – Higher Agricultural Institute "G. Dimitrov" and the Higher Veterinary Medical Institute "G. Pavlov" in Sofia. GAAA was closed in 1975.

The State Council of Bulgaria restored the scientific Agricultural Academy in 1982. Between 2000 and 2008 the academy was named National Center for Agrarian Sciences.

In the summer of 2018, a new set of rules was adopted, which introduced important changes to its structure. Since 1 August 2018, the academic titles of "academician" (full member) and "corresponding member" were introduced.

The structure of the academy includes numerous subdivisions: 38 research institutes, 35 experimental stations, Kabiyuk agricultural research complex, National Agricultural Museum, etc.

The heads of the Agricultural Academy are Acad. Titko Chernokolev, Acad. Hristo Daskalov, Acad. Kunyu Stoev, Acad. Tseno Hinkovski, Corresponding Member Vasil Chichibaba, Prof. Hristo Karzhin, Acad. Tsvetan Tsvetkov, Prof. Svetla Bachvarova, Assoc. Prof. Georgi Kostov, Prof. Petar Slaveykov, Prof. Hristo Bozukov, Prof. Totka Trifonova, Prof. Ivan Pachev, Prof. Vasil Nikolov, Prof. Martin Banov, Prof. Violeta Bozhanova.

Members of the Executive Bureau of the Agricultural Academy in recent years have been Prof. Nikola Vichev, Assoc. Prof. Margarita Nikolova, Assoc. Prof. Galina Panayotova, Prof. Valentin Bachvarov, Prof. Lazar Kozelov, Prof. Maya Ignatova, Assoc. Prof. Zdravka Petkova, Prof. Hristo Daskalov, Prof. Iliana Nacheva, Prof. Elena Todorovska.
