= Georgi Tahov =

Bulgarian politician (born 1971)

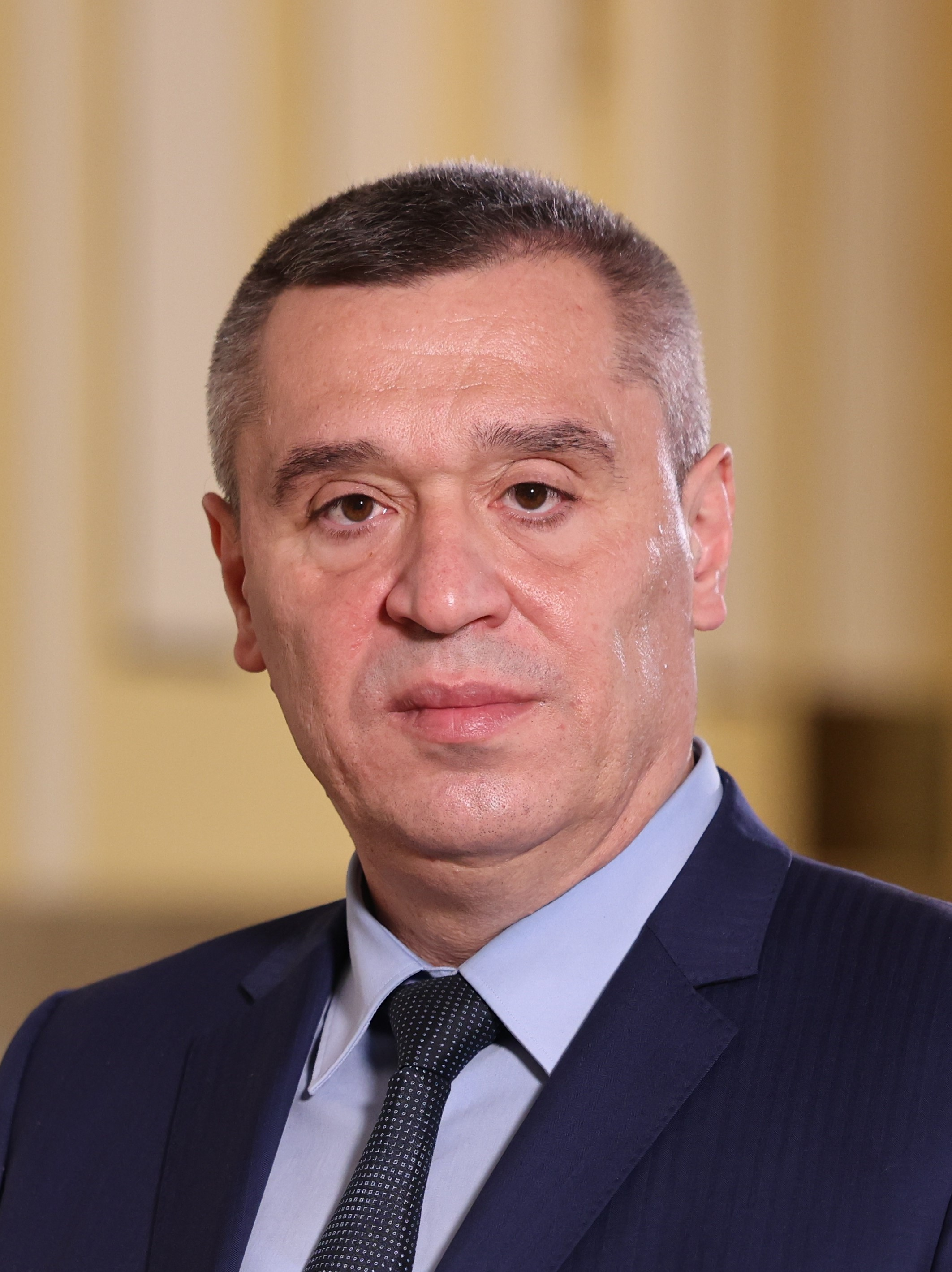
- Tahov in 2024

Minister of Agriculture and Food
- Incumbent
- Assumed office 22 April 2024
- Prime Minister: Dimitar Glavchev; Rosen Zhelyazkov; Andrey Gyurov
- Preceded by: Kiril Vatev

Personal details
- Born: 7 August 1971 (age 55)
- Party: Independent

Georgi Tahov (Bulgarian: Георги Тахов; born 7 August 1971) is a Bulgarian politician serving as minister of agriculture and food since 2024. From 2022 to 2024, he served as executive director of the State Fund Agriculture.
