= Valentin Mundrov =

Bulgarian politician (born 1978)

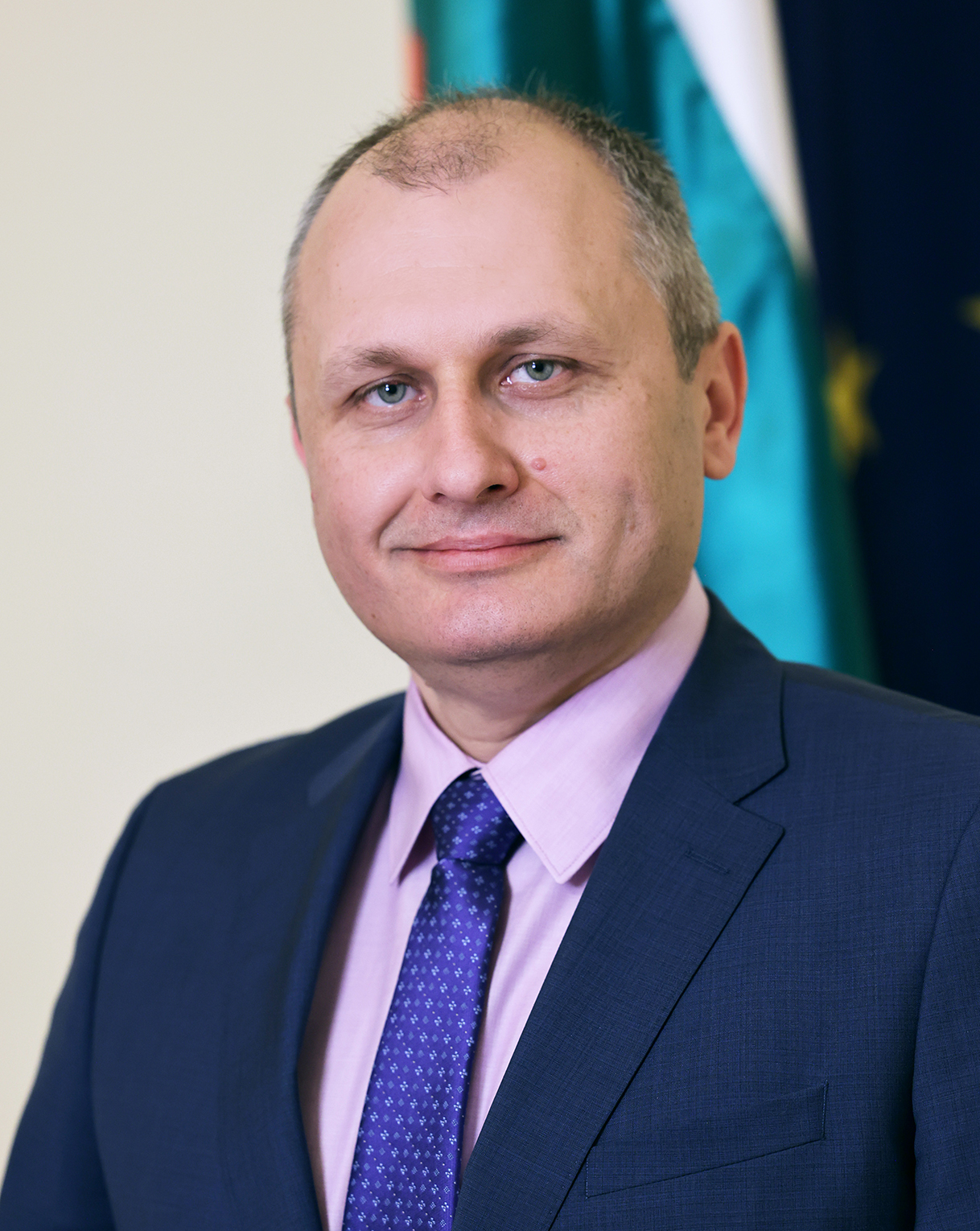
- Mundrov in 2024

Minister of Electronic Governance
- In office 9 April 2024 – 19 February 2026
- Prime Minister: Dimitar Glavchev; Rosen Zhelyazkov
- Preceded by: Alexander Yolovski
- Succeeded by: Georgi Sharkov

Personal details
- Born: 14 July 1976 (age 49)
- Party: Independent

Valentin Atanasov Mundrov (Bulgarian: Валентин Атанасов Мундров; born 14 July 1976) is a Bulgarian politician serving as minister of electronic governance since 2024. From 2023 to 2024, he served as deputy minister of electronic governance.
