= Politics of Bulgaria =

Bulgaria is a parliamentary representative democratic republic, whereby the prime minister is the head of government, and of a multi-party system. Executive power is exercised by the government. Legislative power is vested in both the government and the National Assembly. The Judiciary is independent of the executive and the legislature.

After forty-five years of single party system, Bulgaria became an unstable party system in 1989. This system was dominated by democratic parties and opposition to socialists – the Union of Democratic Forces and several personalistic parties and the post-communist Bulgarian Socialist Party or its creatures, which emerged for a short period of time in the past decade. Personalistic parties could have been seen in the former governing (from 2001 to 2005) Simeon II's NDSV party and Boyko Borisov's GERB party. Bulgaria has generally good freedom of speech and human rights records as reported by the US Library of Congress Federal Research Division in 2006, while Freedom House listed it as "free" in 2020, giving it scores of 33 for political rights and 45 for civil liberties. However, in 2014, there were some concerns that the proposed new Penal Code would limit freedom of the press and assembly, and as a consequence freedom of speech. The Economist Intelligence Unit rated Bulgaria a "flawed democracy" in 2022. Bulgaria was fully admitted to the Schengen Area on January 1, 2025.

== Developments since 1990 ==
=== Parliamentary ===
After the fall of communism in 1989, the former communist party was restructured and succeeded by the Bulgarian Socialist Party (BSP), which won the first post-communist elections for the Constitutional Assembly in 1990 with a small majority. Meanwhile, Zhelyu Zhelev, a communist-era dissident from the new democratic party - Union of Democratic Forces (abbreviated in Bulgarian as SDS), was elected president by the Assembly in 1990. In the first years after the change of regime, Bulgarian politics had to (re)establish the foundations of a democratic society in the country after nearly fifty years of de facto totalitarian communism. The so-called period of transition (from a Soviet socialist model to an economic structure focused on development through economic growth) began in the early 1990s. The politics of Bulgaria was aimed at joining the European Union and NATO, as the alliances were recognised to have political agendas similar to the goals of the new Bulgarian democracy.

In contemporary Bulgaria, the government and its leader - the Prime Minister, have more political influence and significance than the President. Thus, the parliamentary elections set the short-term social and political environment in the country since the cabinet (chosen by the Prime Minister and approved by the parliament) decides how the country is governed while the President can only make suggestions and impose vetoes.

In the first parliamentary elections held under the new constitution of Bulgaria, in October 1991, the Union of Democratic Forces (SDS) party won a majority of the seats, having won 110 out of the 240 seats, and created a cabinet with only the support of the Movement for Rights and Freedoms—a liberal party (in Bulgarian abbreviated: DPS) which is widely perceived as a party of the ethnic Turks minority in Bulgaria. Yet, their government collapsed in late 1992, and was succeeded by a technocratic team put forward by the Bulgarian Socialist Party (BSP), which served until 1994 when it also collapsed. The president dissolved the government and appointed a provisional one to serve until early parliamentary elections could be held in December.

BSP won these elections convincingly in December 1994 with a majority of 125 seats out of the 240. Due to the severe economic crisis in Bulgaria during their government, BSP's cabinet collapsed and in 1997 a caretaker cabinet was appointed by the president, again, to serve until early parliamentary elections could be held in April 1997.

The April 1997 elections resulted in a landslide victory for the SDS, winning a majority of 137 seats in parliament, and allowing them to form the next government. This proved to be the first post-communist government that did not collapse and served its full 4-year term until 2001.

In 2001, the former monarch of Bulgaria Simeon Saxe-Coburg-Gotha returned to power, this time as prime minister with his National Movement Simeon II (in Bulgarian abbreviated: NDSV), having won half (120) of the seats. His party entered a coalition with the DPS and invited two functionaries of the BSP (who sat as independents). In opposition were the two previously governing parties - the Socialist Party and the Union of Democratic Forces. In its four years in opposition numerous splinter groups split of from the SDS. The ruling party NDSV itself ruptured into a pro-right core and a pro-liberal fringe group. Bulgaria entered NATO in 2004.

In the aftermath, the BSP won the parliamentary elections in 2005 with 82 out of the 240 seats, but as it did not get the majority of the seats, a coalition government was formed by the three biggest parties - BSP, NDSV and DPS. The elections also put in parliament some of the right-wing parties, as well as the extreme-right nationalist coalition led by the party Ataka as an answer to the former coalition government of NDSV with DPS. Bulgaria entered the European Union in 2007.

In the parliamentary elections of 2009, the centre-right party of Boyko Borisov, the mayor of Sofia, GERB, won with 117 seats. The party formed a minority government with the support of the right-wing parties. Once the governing party - the National Movement Simeon II did not amass enough votes to enter the parliament. The austerity measures required in the stagnation of the Great Recession led to massive protests and the resignation of the cabinet in early 2013, months before the end of GERB's term.

In the early elections the former opposition party BSP received highest vote from the people. The socialist party chose the non-party former Minister of Finance Plamen Oresharski to form a cabinet. His cabinet was supported by the BSP and the DPS, opposed by GERB, while Ataka was absent.

Only two weeks after its initial formation the Oresharski government came under criticism and had to deal with large-scale protests some with more than 11 000 participants. One of the main reasons for these protests was the controversial appointment of media mogul Delyan Peevski as a chief of the National Security State Agency. The protests continued over the lifetime of the Oresharski government. In all, the government survived 5 votes of no-confidence before voluntarily resigning. Following an agreement from the three largest parties (GERB, BSP and DPS) to hold early parliamentary elections for 25 March 2016, the cabinet agreed to resign, with the resignation of the cabinet becoming a fact on 13 January 2016. The next day parliament voted 180-8 (8 abstained and 44 were absent) to accept the government's resignation. Following the vote, President Plevneliev offered the mandate to GERB to try and form government, but it was refused. The next day the BSP returned the mandate as well. On 21 January, the DPS refused the mandate as well. Finally, on 26 January, a caretaker government led by Georgi Bliznashki was sworn into office and the Oresharski government was officially dissolved.

As agreed, parliamentary elections were held on 25 March 2016 to elect the 43rd National Assembly. GERB became the largest party, winning 84 of the 240 seats with around a third of the vote. A total of eight parties won seats, the first time since the beginning of democratic elections in 1990 that more than seven parties entered parliament. After being tasked by President Rosen Plevneliev to form a government, Borisov's GERB formed a coalition with the Reformist Bloc, had a partnership agreement for the support of the Alternative for Bulgarian Revival, and also had the outside support of the Patriotic Front. The cabinet of twenty ministers was approved by a majority of 136–97 (with one abstention). With the support of the coalition partner (the Reformist Bloc) members of the parties in the Bloc (Democrats for a Strong Bulgaria (DSB), Union of Democratic Forces (SDS), Bulgaria for Citizens Movement (DBG) and Bulgarian Agrarian National Union (BZNS)) were chosen for Minister positions. The vice chairman of the Alternative for Bulgarian Revival party Ivaylo Kalfin was voted for Depute Prime Minister and Minister of Labor and Social Policy.

In May 2017, Boyko Borisov was re-elected as Prime Minister of Bulgaria for the second time. Borisov had resigned and called early elections after his conservative GERB party lost the presidential elections previous year. He formed a coalition government with nationalist VMRO-BND and National Front for Salvation of Bulgaria. The Socialist Party and the Turkish DPS party formed the opposition.

The 2020–2021 Bulgarian protests were triggered on 9 July 2020, when the Presidency of Bulgaria was raided by police and prosecutors as a result of a long-lasting conflict between the prime minister Boyko Borisov and the president Rumen Radev. In April 2021, Borisov's party, center-right, pro-European GERB won the parliamentary election. It was again the largest party of the parliament but it did not get the absolute majority, indicating difficult coalition talks. All other parties refused to form a government, and after a brief deadlock, another elections were called for July 2021, with Stefan Yanev serving as an interim prime minister of a caretaker cabinet until then.

In the July 2021 snap election, an anti-elite party called There Is Such a People (ITN) finished first with 24.08 percent, and former prime minister Boyko Borisov's GERB-led coalition finished second with 23.51 percent of the vote. A coalition government was unable to be formed, and so a third parliamentary election was scheduled for November 2021 to align with the regularly scheduled presidential election. In the 2021 Bulgarian general election, Kiril Petkov's PP party emerged as surprise victors over the conservative GERB party, which had dominated Bulgarian politics in the last decade. In December 2021, Bulgaria's parliament formally elected Kiril Petkov as the country's next prime minister, ending a months-long political crisis. The new centrist-led government was a coalition led by Petkov's anti-corruption We Continue The Change party (PP) with three other political groups: the left-wing Bulgarian Socialist Party, the anti-elite There Is Such A People party, and the liberal group Democratic Bulgaria. They together control 134 seats in Bulgaria's 240-seat parliament. The cabinet of Kiril Petkov fell after a vote of no confidence of 22 June 2022. President Radev appointed Galab Donev as acting prime minister to lead a caretaker cabinet. Bulgaria's fourth parliamentary elections in less than two years were held on October 2, 2022.

In April 2023, because of the political deadlock, Bulgaria held its fifth parliamentary election since April 2021. GERB was the biggest, winning 69 seats. The bloc led by We Continue the Change won 64 seats in the 240-seat parliament. In June 2023, Prime Minister Nikolai Denkov formed a new coalition between We Continue The Change and GERB. According to the coalition agreement, Denkov will lead the government for the first nine months. He will be succeeded by former European Commissioner, Mariya Gabriel, of the GERB party. She will take over as prime minister after nine months.

On 27 October 2024 parliamentary snap elections were held after all three attempts to form a government following the latest June 2024 elections failed. This was the country's sixth election since April 2021. This series of snap elections was the result of a political crisis affecting the country.

In January 2026 Bulgaria's president Rumen Radev resigned from the mostly ceremonial role of presidency before the snap election. On 8 May 2026, Rumen Radev was sworn in as Bulgaria's prime minister after a landslide victory of his party, Progressive Bulgaria, in the April general election.

=== Presidential ===
In 1992, Zhelyu Zhelev won Bulgaria's first presidential elections and served as president until 1997. In the second, the winning president was another member of the Union of Democratic Forces, Petar Stoyanov, who served until 2002. In 2001, the leader of the Bulgarian Socialist Party, Georgi Parvanov defeated Stoyanov. He took office in 2002 and served until 2012, becoming the first president to be reelected, after his successful 2006 campaign. In 2011 GERB candidate Rosen Plevneliev was elected to serve as president from 2012 until January 2017. In 2016 Socialist party candidate, former air force commander Rumen Radev won the presidential election. On 18 January 2017, Rumen Radev was sworn in as the new President of Bulgaria. President Rumen Radev, a vocal critic and rival of prime minister Borisov, announced that he will run for a second five-year term in autumn 2021 presidential elections. In November 2021, President Rumen Radev was easily re-elected in the presidential election with a very low turnout of 34 per cent.

== Executive branch ==
The president of Bulgaria is directly elected for a 5-year term with the right to one re-election. The president serves as the head of state and commander in chief of the armed forces. The President's main duties are to schedule elections and referendums, represent Bulgaria abroad, conclude international treaties, and head the Consultative Council for National Security. The president may return legislation to the National Assembly for further debate—a kind of veto—but the legislation can be passed again by an absolute majority vote.

== Legislative branch ==
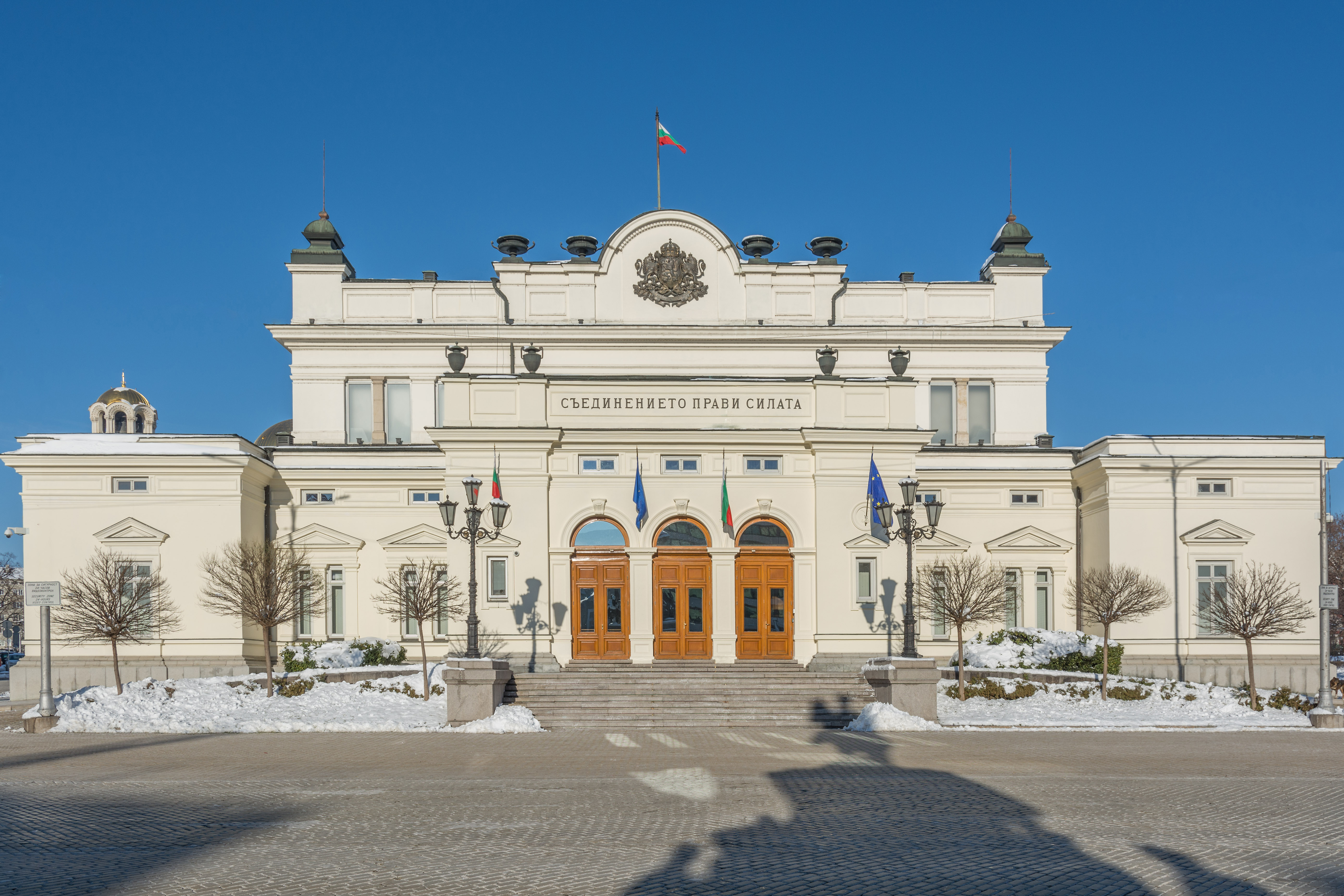
The National Assembly

The Bulgarian unicameral parliament, the National Assembly or Narodno Sabranie, consists of 240 deputies who are elected for 4-year-terms by popular vote. The votes are for party or coalition lists of candidates for each of the 28 administrative divisions. A party or coalition must garner a minimum of 4% of the vote in order to enter parliament. Parliament is responsible for enactment of laws, approval of the budget, scheduling of presidential elections, selection and dismissal of the prime minister and other ministers, declaration of war, deployment of troops outside of Bulgaria, and ratification of international treaties and agreements.

== Elections ==
=== Parliamentary elections ===
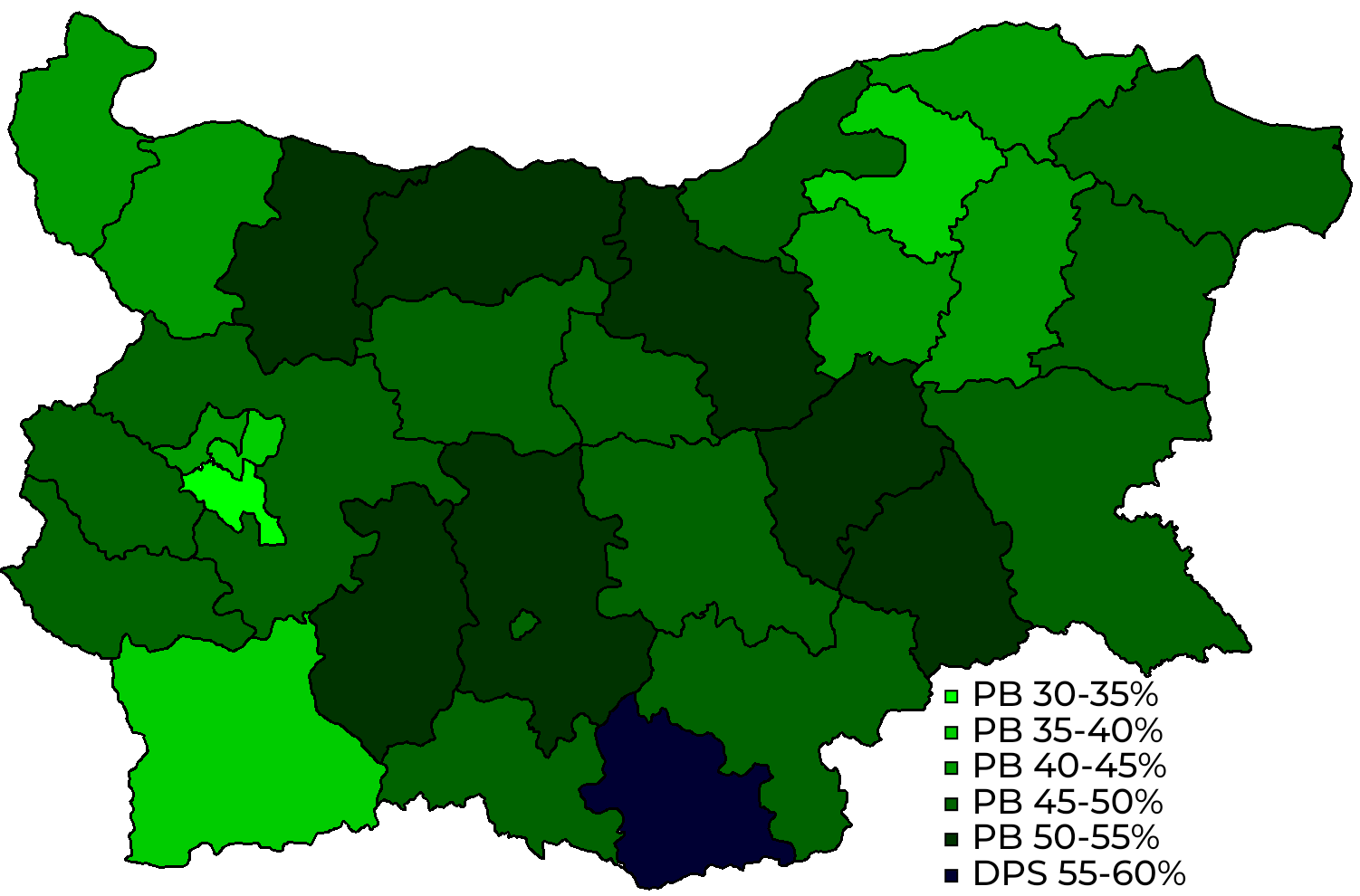
Results of the election showed that PB was the most voted party in all provinces of Bulgaria except Kardzhali .

PB was the largest party with 44.6% of the vote, followed by GERB/SDS with 13.3%, PP–DP with 12.6%, DPS with 7.1%, and Revival with 4.3%. Among other main parties, MECh, Velichie, and BSP–OL respectively obtained 3.2%, 3.1%, and 3.0%, narrowly below the 4% threshold. In terms of seats, PB obtained an absolute majority with 131 seats, followed by GERB/SDS with 39, PP–DP with 37, DPS with 21, and Revival with 12. Although PB obtained a larger than expected win, the final polls were relatively accurate and within (or close to) the margin of error as Market Links, Alpha Research, Myara, Sova Harris, Trend, CAM, and Gallup respectively deviated by an average of 2.79%, 3.14%, 3.24%, 3.64%, 3.71%, 4.01%, and 4.83% from the election results.

Party	Votes	%	Seats	+/–
Progressive Bulgaria	1,444,920	43.91	131	New
GERB–SDS	433,755	13.18	39	−27
We Continue the Change – Democratic Bulgaria	408,846	12.42	37	+1
Movement for Rights and Freedoms	230,693	7.01	21	−8
Revival	137,940	4.19	12	−21
Morality, Unity, Honour	104,506	3.18	0	–11
Velichie	100,572	3.06	0	–10
BSP – United Left	97,753	2.97	0	–19
Siyanie	93,559	2.84	0	New
Alliance for Rights and Freedoms	50,759	1.54	0	–19
There is Such a People	23,861	0.73	0	–17
Anti-Corruption Bloc	18,999	0.58	0	0
Blue Bulgaria	18,640	0.57	0	0
Bulgaria Can	17,263	0.52	0	0
Direct Democracy	10,032	0.30	0	New
Nation	9,804	0.30	0	New
Movement of Non-Partisan Candidates	9,761	0.30	0	New
Nepokorna Bulgaria	6,221	0.19	0	New
People's Voice	4,665	0.14	0	New
People's Party "Truth and Only the Truth"	4,392	0.13	0	0
My Bulgaria	4,358	0.13	0	0
Party of the Greens	3,027	0.09	0	0
Resistance	1,897	0.06	0	New
Third of March	1,840	0.06	0	New
Independents	2,093	0.06	0	New
None of the above	50,733	1.54	–	–
Total	3,290,889	100.00	240	0
Valid votes	3,290,889	97.94		
Invalid/blank votes	69,222	2.06		
Total votes	3,360,111	100.00		
Registered voters/turnout	6,627,747	50.70		
Source: Central Electoral Commission

Vote share
PB	43.91%
GERB–SDS	13.18%
PP–DB	12.42%
DPS	7.01%
Revival	4.19%
MECh	3.18%
Velichie	3.06%
BSP–OL	2.97%
Siyanie	2.84%
APS	1.54%
Others	5.70%

Seat share
PB	54.58%
GERB–SDS	16.25%
PP–DB	15.42%
DPS	8.75%
Revival	5.00%

=== Turnout ===
According to various exit polls, voter turnout at 19:00 was respectively estimated at 46.8% by Alpha Research and 44.9% by Myara. Final turnout exit polls showed that it was respectively estimated at 51.3% by Market Links, 48.8% by Alpha Research, 48.5% by Myara, and 48.0% by Trend. Overall, final turnout slightly exceeded 50%.

Turnout (only within Bulgaria, excluding voters from abroad)
Constituency	11:00	16:00	Overall
Blagoevgrad	11.33%	34.04%	48.78%
Burgas	10.51%	35.37%	49.96%
Varna	11.20%	35.11%	50.88%
Veliko Tarnovo	14.20%	36.98%	49.82%
Vidin	16.58%	35.26%	46.11%
Vratsa	17.13%	39.97%	52.95%
Gabrovo	12.67%	36.32%	48.73%
Dobrich	11.97%	30.31%	40.38%
Kardzhali	7.85%	23.34%	29.79%
Kyustendil	12.35%	32.88%	44.17%
Lovech	15.61%	36.98%	49.10%
Montana	16.46%	39.21%	52.11%
Pazardzhik	11.80%	32.07%	45.98%
Pernik	12.31%	38.43%	54.35%
Pleven	13.03%	34.73%	47.41%
Plovdiv-city	8.07%	34.50%	52.17%
Plovdiv-province	11.97%	33.76%	48.13%
Razgrad	12.41%	28.28%	36.86%
Ruse	13.30%	34.46%	45.92%
Silistra	13.96%	32.86%	43.88%
Sliven	10.35%	28.96%	39.79%
Smolyan	15.89%	42.63%	55.50%
Sofia-city 23	11.46%	43.38%	61.76%
Sofia-city 24	8.74%	29.46%	42.14%
Sofia-city 25	12.25%	38.58%	53.29%
Sofia-province	17.07%	34.45%	56.01%
Stara Zagora	14.21%	37.92%	51.13%
Targovishte	12.56%	31.03%	41.41%
Haskovo	14.26%	37.08%	49.28%
Shumen	11.38%	29.51%	38.49%
Yambol	14.88%	36.79%	48.28%
Bulgaria	12.12%	34.63%	51.11%

=== Voter demographics ===
As part of its exit poll, Alpha Research released a demographic breakdown showing that PB won in every age group, including among the 18–30 years old, a group of voters that had become more politically engaged as part of the anti-establishment protests in late 2025.

Voter demographics in percentage
Social group	PB	GERB–SDS	PP–DB	DPS	Vaz.	BSP–OL
Final result	43.9	13.2	12.4	7.0	4.2	3.0
Gender
Men	45	13	13	8	5	3
Women	44	14	12	7	4	4
Age
18–30	42	12	20	7	3	2
30–60	44	14	12	8	5	3
60+	46	13	8	7	4	8
Level of education
Lower education	44	11	2	27	1	4
Secondary education	45	15	15	5	5	4
Higher education	40	13	19	2	4	3
Ethnic group
Bulgarian	46	13	14	1	5	4
Turkish	20	6	5	45	0	1
Roma	15	20	1	30	3	5
Location
Towns and villages	38	9	4	24	3	5
Smaller cities	45	17	10	2	5	5
Larger cities	43	14	14	3	6	4
Sofia	32	14	30	0	5	3

=== Presidential elections ===
Candidate	Running mate	Party	First round		Second round	
Candidate	Running mate	Party	Votes	%	Votes	%
Rumen Radev	Iliana Iotova	Independent (BSP for Bulgaria, We Continue the Change, There Is Such a People, Stand Up.BG! We are coming!)	1,322,385	49.42	1,539,650	66.72
Anastas Gerdzhikov	Nevyana Miteva	Independent (GERB–SDS)	610,862	22.83	733,791	31.80
Mustafa Karadayi	Iskra Mihaylova	Movement for Rights and Freedoms	309,681	11.57		
Kostadin Kostadinov	Elena Guncheva	Revival	104,832	3.92		
Lozan Panov	Maria Kasimova	Independent (Democratic Bulgaria)	98,488	3.68		
Luna Yordanova	Iglena Ilieva	Independent	21,733	0.81		
Volen Siderov	Magdalena Tasheva	Attack	14,792	0.55		
Svetoslav Vitkov	Veselin Belokonski	People's Voice	13,972	0.52		
Milen Mihov	Mariya Tsvetkova	VMRO – Bulgarian National Movement	13,376	0.50		
Rosen Milenov	Ivan Ivanov	Independent	12,644	0.47		
Goran Blagoev	Ivelina Georgieva	Republicans for Bulgaria	12,323	0.46		
Veselin Mareshki	Polina Tsankova	Volya Movement	10,536	0.39		
Valeri Simeonov	Tsvetan Manchev	Patriotic Front	8,568	0.32		
Nikolay Malinov	Svetlana Koseva	Russophiles for the Revival of the Fatherland	8,213	0.31		
Tsveta Kirilova	Georgi Tutanov	Independent	7,706	0.29		
Aleksandar Tomov	Lachezar Avramov	Bulgarian Social Democracy – EuroLeft	7,235	0.27		
Boyan Rasate	Elena Vatashka	Bulgarian National Union – New Democracy	6,798	0.25		
Marina Malcheva	Savina Lukanova	Independent	6,315	0.24		
Zhelyo Zhelev	Kalin Krulev	Society for a New Bulgaria	6,154	0.23		
Blagoy Petrevski	Sevina Hadjiyska	Bulgarian Union for Direct Democracy	5,518	0.21		
Yolo Denev	Mario Filev	Independent	5,394	0.20		
Maria Koleva	Gancho Popov	Pravoto	4,666	0.17		
Georgi Georgiev-Goti	Stoyan Tsvetkov	Bulgarian National Unification	2,958	0.11		
None of the above			60,786	2.27	34,169	1.48
Total			2,675,935	100.00	2,307,610	100.00
Valid votes			2,675,935	99.65	2,307,610	99.83
Invalid/blank votes			9,487	0.35	3,909	0.17
Total votes			2,685,422	100.00	2,311,519	100.00
Registered voters/turnout			6,667,895	40.27	6,672,935	34.64
Source: Electoral Commission of Bulgaria (first round), Electoral Commission of Bulgaria (second round)

=== European elections ===
Party	Votes	%	Seats	+/–
GERB–SDS	474,059	23.55	5	–1
Movement for Rights and Freedoms	295,092	14.66	3	0
We Continue the Change – Democratic Bulgaria	290,865	14.45	3	+2
Revival	281,434	13.98	3	+3
BSP for Bulgaria	141,178	7.01	2	–3
There is Such a People	121,572	6.04	1	New
Velichie	81,955	4.07	–	New
Morality, Unity, Honour	51,076	2.54	–	New
VMRO – Bulgarian National Movement	42,022	2.09	–	–2
Blue Bulgaria	24,917	1.24	–	New
Solidary Bulgaria	24,685	1.23	–	New
Center	20,869	1.04	–	New
Party of the Greens	17,131	0.85	–	0
Independent candidate Kuzman Iliev	11,057	0.55	–	New
The Left!	10,230	0.51	–	New
Bulgarian Rise	9,510	0.47	–	New
Green Movement	8,347	0.41	–	–
People's Voice	6,921	0.34	–	–
Direct Democracy	5,257	0.26	–	–
We Are Coming	4,999	0.25	–	New
We the Citizens	4,937	0.25	–	New
Unification	4,302	0.21	–	New
Bulgarian Voice	2,821	0.14	–	New
Citizens Bloc	2,310	0.11	–	New
Coalition of the Rose	2,294	0.11	–	New
Society for a New Bulgaria	2,073	0.10	–	New
Bulgarian National Union – New Democracy	1,956	0.10	–	New
For a Great Bulgaria	1,770	0.09	–	New
People's Party "Truth and Only the Truth"	1,733	0.09	–	New
Bulgarian National Unification	983	0.05	–	–
Bulgarian Union for Direct Democracy	895	0.04	–	New
None of the above	63,810	3.17	–	–
Total	2,013,060	100.00	17	0
Valid votes	2,013,060	97.05		
Invalid/blank votes	61,238	2.95		
Total votes	2,074,298	100.00		
Registered voters/turnout	6,170,472	33.62		
Source: Central Electoral Commission, European Parliament

== Judicial branch ==
The Bulgarian judicial system consists of regional, district and appeal courts, as well as a Supreme Court of Cassation and one Specialized Criminal Court. In addition, there is a Supreme Administrative Court and a system of military courts. The Presidents of the Supreme Court of Cassation and the Supreme Administrative Court as well as the Prosecutor General are elected by a qualified majority of two-thirds from all the members of the Supreme Judicial Council and are appointed by the president of the Republic. The Supreme Judicial Council is in charge of the self-administration and organisation of the Judiciary.

A qualified majority of two-thirds of the membership of the Supreme Judicial Council elects the Presidents of the Supreme Court of Cassation and of the Supreme Administrative Court, as well as the Prosecutor General, from among its members; the president of the Republic then appoints those elected.

The Supreme Judicial Council has charge of the self-administration and organization of the Judiciary.

The Constitutional Court of Bulgaria supervises the review of the constitutionality of laws and statutes brought before it, as well as the compliance of these laws with international treaties that the Government has signed. Parliament elects the 12 members of the Constitutional Court by a two-thirds majority. The members serve for a nine-year term.

== Administrative divisions ==
The territory of the Republic of Bulgaria is divided into provinces and municipalities. In all Bulgaria has 28 provinces, each headed by a provincial governor appointed by the government. In addition, there are 265 municipalities.

== Other data ==
Political pressure groups and leaders:

- Confederation of Independent Trade Unions of Bulgaria or CITUB
- Confederation of Labour Podkrepa
- numerous regional, ethnic, and national interest groups with various agendas

== See also ==
- President of Bulgaria
- Prime Minister of Bulgaria
- List of prime ministers of Bulgaria
- List of heads of state of Bulgaria
- List of presidents of Bulgaria (1990–present)
- List of ministries of Bulgaria
- Foreign relations of Bulgaria
- Flag of Bulgaria
