= 1996 ODS presidential primary =

1996 Bulgarian opposition presidential primary election

1996 ODS presidential primaries
24 March and 1 June 1996
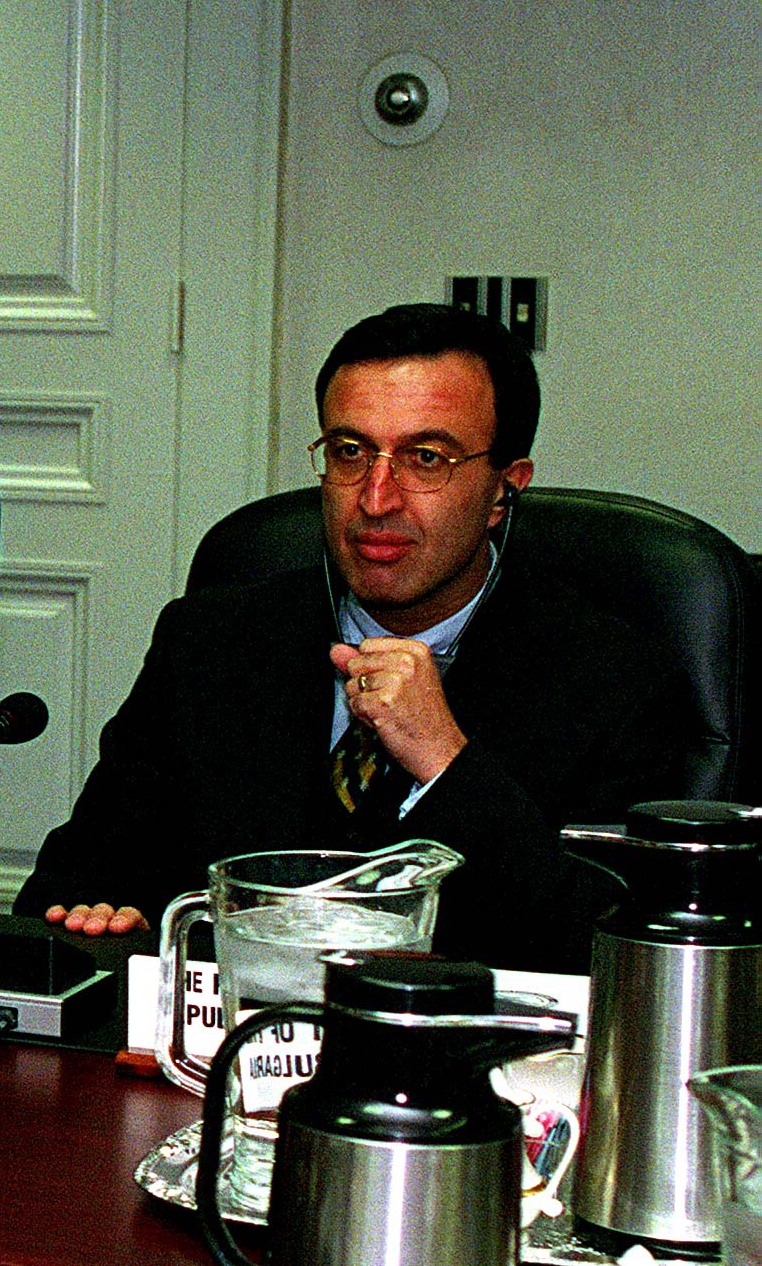

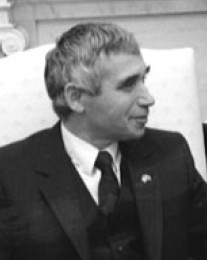
Candidate	Petar Stoyanov	Zhelyu Zhelev
Party	SDS	BZNS–DP
Popular vote	558,643	291,385
Percentage	65.7%	34.3%

Open primary elections were held in Bulgaria in 1996 to determine the joint presidential candidate for SDS, BZNS–DP and DPS, the three largest parliamentary opposition coalitions, which would merge into ODS the following month, ahead of the upcoming 1996 presidential election. Incumbent president Zhelyu Zhelev was eligible and ran for a second term in office. He was defeated by Petar Stoyanov, who went on to defeat Ivan Marazov in the presidential election.

== Background ==
=== Early SDS divisions ===
SDS-United Opposition was founded in December 1989 as a coalition of 8 movements and 2 parties, later joined by 6 additional parties. Following the 1990 Constitutional Assembly election, the gridlocked Grand National Assembly elected a joint ticket of SDS's Zhelyu Zhelev and BSP's Atanas Semerdzhiev to serve as Chairman (President) and Co-Chairman of the republic in August 1990. In 1991 SDS suffered internal divisions, with a split between SDS-Movement (Note: SDS-Movement included the coalition's official leader Philip Dimitrov as well as the 39 SDS dissenting MPs who had refused to attend parliamentary sessions and had gone on hunger strikes in disagreement with the new constitution.), SDS-Center, SDS-Liberals and BZNS. The Constitutional Assembly approved the new constitution in July 1991 with 313 votes in favour and dissolved itself. Following the subsequent 1991 election, Philip Dimitrov's SDS-Movement was the only SDS faction to enter the National Assembly, where it formed a minority government with the support of DPS.

=== Zhelev's relationship with SDS ===
Zheluy Zhelev was elected to a full presidential term term in January 1992 with SDS MP Blaga Dimitrova as his vice president. In August 1992 he called the Boyana meadows press conference, in which he withdrew his support from the SDS minority government. Following the press conference 23 MPs around Dimitar Ludzhev (nicknamed "blue ants") left the SDS parliamentary group and DPS withdrew its support for the government, which fell in October and presidential advisor Lyuben Berov became Prime Minister with the support of DPS and BSP. Zhelev's relationship with SDS continued to deteriorate with VP Blaga Dimitrova resigning in July 1993. She later became a harsh critic of him during the primary process and endorsed Petar Stoyanov. Following the 1994 election the BSP-led coalition formed a majority government, leaving DPS, SDS BZNS-DP, one of its splinter coalitions, into opposition.

== Candidates ==
Incumbent president Zhelev had announced his intention to run for a second term in November 1995. He wasn't supported by SDS, instead in April 1996 the 3 largest opposition coalitions announced they would hold a joint primary to determine their presidential candidate, to which Zhelev agreed to participate under internal pressure. SDS considered nominating a candidate outright (with SDS parliamentary group co-leader and MP Petar Stoyanov being the favourite), however they held an internal primary between three candidates - Stoyanov, Aleksandar Yordanov and Asen Agov in March, which was won by Stoyanov. BZNS-DP backed Zhelev and DPS remained neutral. The primary was held on 1 June and Stoyanov won with 66% of the vote.

== Results ==
Candidate	Party	First round		Second round	
Candidate	Party	Votes	%	Votes	%
Zhelyu Zhelev	BZNS–DP			291,385	34.28
Petar Stoyanov	SDS	1,945	77.21	558,643	65.72
Aleksandar Yordanov	SDS (RDP)	306	12.15		
Asen Agov	SDS (HDS)	268	10.64		
Total		2,519	100.00	850,028	100.00

== Aftermath ==
Shortly before the presidential election, ODS was founded as an electoral alliance between SDS, BZNS–DP and DPS. DPS left the coalition after the presidential election and in February 1997 several of the coalition members merged to form SDS as a party, with Ivan Kostov as party chairman. SDS, BZNS, DP and others remained within ODS and won the 1997 election and formed a majority government.

After the end of his presidency Zhelyu Zhelev founded Liberal Alternative, which received 0.32% in the 1997 election, after which he retired from active politics. He remailed honorary chairman of Liberal Alternative, which ran in an electoral alliance with DPS in 2001.

Petar Stoyanov won the 1996 presidential election, but lost his reelection bid in the 2001 election. He served as leader of SDS from 2005 until 2007, when he resigned following the 2007 EU election.
