= List of presidents of Bulgaria (1990–present) =

President of the Republic of Bulgaria
- Президент на Република България
- Coat of arms of Bulgaria

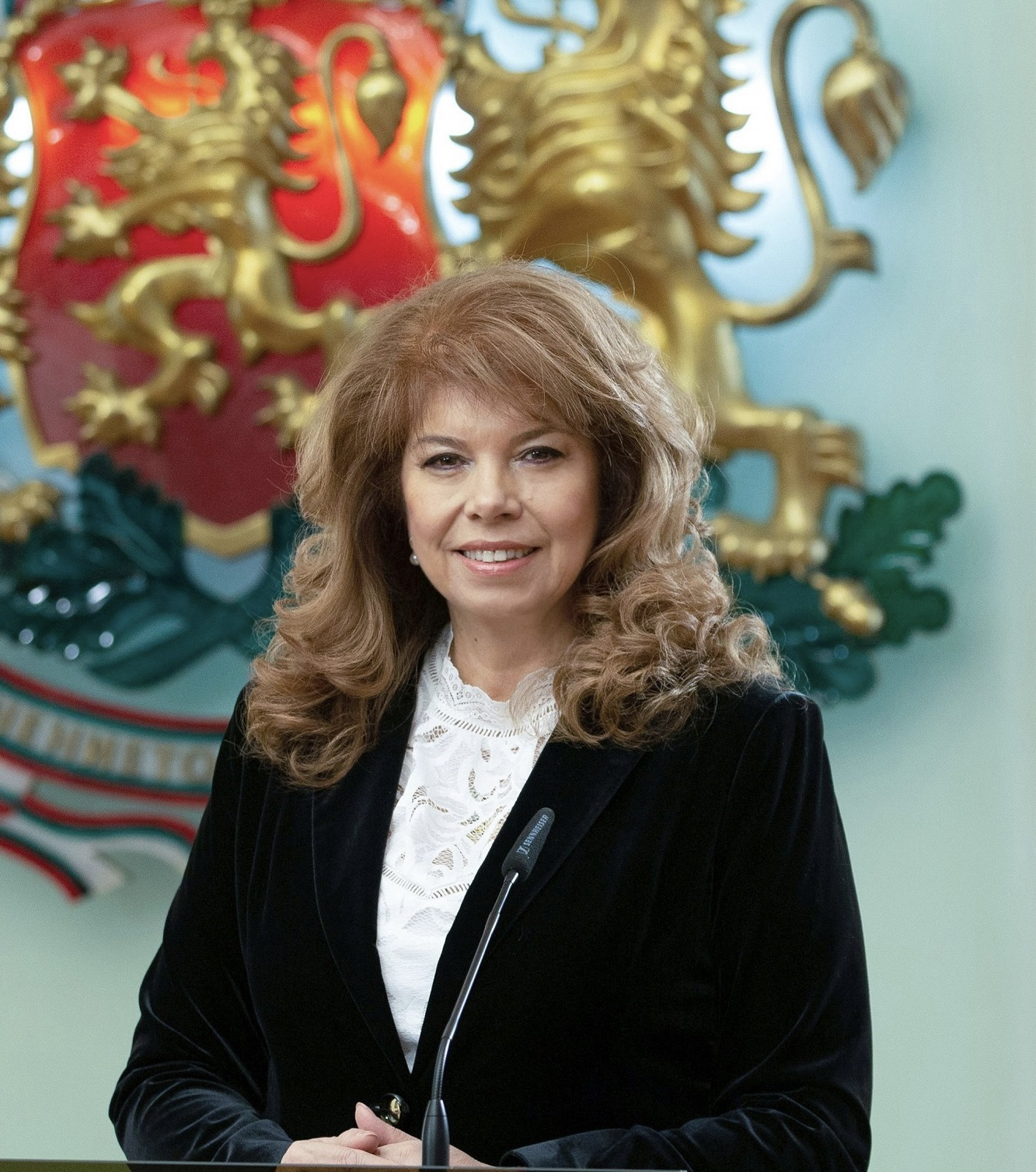
- Incumbent; Iliana Iotova since 23 January 2026
- Style: Her Excellency
- Residence: Largo, Sofia
- Term length: Five years, renewable once
- Inaugural holder: Petar Mladenov
- Formation: 3 April 1990
- Deputy: Vacant
- Salary: € 2,845.57 / $ 3,947.92 per month (March 2014)
- Website: www.president.bg

The modern Bulgarian presidency was formed in 1990 after the fall of the Bulgarian People's Republic. The latest presidential election took place in 2021 Bulgarian general election, which saw incumbent Rumen Radev reelected for a second term.

== History of the institution ==
In the Kingdom of Bulgaria, the functions of head of state were performed by the reigning monarch or through a regency. Later, during the communist era, the chairman of the State Council of Bulgaria served as the paramount head of state of the People's Republic of Bulgaria. However, the general secretary of the Bulgarian Communist Party also served de facto representative and executive for the country. The following is a list of presidents of Bulgaria since the modern republic was established in 1990.

The modern history of the presidential institution in Bulgaria is relatively short and is mostly associated with the reconstruction of the country after the fall of the communist regime in 1989. With the restructuring of the institutions in the context of the transition of Bulgaria to democracy and market economy, the office of the presidency was instituted with the adoption of the new constitution on July 12, 1991.

The first president of Bulgaria was a doctor of philosophy Zhelyu Zhelev, who had been elected by the National Assembly in 1990. Following the adoption of the new constitution, he was elected by a popular vote in 1992. His vice president was the poet Blaga Dimitrova. The second presidential election was held in 1996 and was won by Petar Stoyanov, who took office on January 22, 1997. His vice president was Todor Kavaldzhiev. In 2001 Stoyanov ran for a second term, but lost the election to Georgi Parvanov. Parvanov and his Vice President, Angel Marin, took office on 22 January 2002. The pair was re-elected in the 2006 election. Parvanov was term limited and ineligible to run again and in 2011 election, and Rosen Plevneliev and Margarita Popova were elected to the presidency. They were inaugurated on 22 January 2012. Plevneliev did not seek a second term in office and the 2016 election resulted in victory for Rumen Radev and Iliana Yotova. They took the presidential oath on January 19, 2017, and were inaugurated three days later on 22 January. The pair was reelected in 2021. Rumen Radev resigned the office on president on 20 January 2026, which was subsequently confirmed by the Constitutional Court three days later. Iliyana Yotova ascended to the presidency, becoming the first president to do so.

The salary that the Bulgarian president receives is equal to two monthly salaries of MPs. As of March 2014 this amounted to 4614 Levs.

== List of presidents of Bulgaria ==
Party legend

Bulgarian Socialist Party (2) Union of Democratic Forces (2) GERB (1) Independent (1)

№	Portrait	Name (Birth–Death)	Term of office / mandates		Prime Ministers	Previous post	Political party
—		Petar Mladenov; Петър Младенов; 1936–2000 (Lived: 63 years)	3 April 1990	6 July 1990	Andrey Lukanov (1990)	Chairman of the State Council of Bulgaria (1989–1990)	Bulgarian Socialist Party
—		Petar Mladenov; Петър Младенов; 1936–2000 (Lived: 63 years)	April 1990 (Note: Elected by the National Assembly)		Andrey Lukanov (1990)	Chairman of the State Council of Bulgaria (1989–1990)	Bulgarian Socialist Party
—		Stanko Todorov; Станко Георгиев; 1920–1996 (Lived: 76 years)	6 July 1990	17 July 1990	Andrey Lukanov (1990)	Chairperson of the National Assembly (1981–1990)	Bulgarian Socialist Party
—		Stanko Todorov; Станко Георгиев; 1920–1996 (Lived: 76 years)	acting as Chairperson of the National Assembly		Andrey Lukanov (1990)	Chairperson of the National Assembly (1981–1990)	Bulgarian Socialist Party
—		Nikolai Todorov; Николай Тодоров; 1921–2003 (Lived: 82 years)	17 July 1990	1 August 1990	Andrey Lukanov (1990)	Chairperson of the National Assembly (1990)	Independent
—		Nikolai Todorov; Николай Тодоров; 1921–2003 (Lived: 82 years)	acting as Chairperson of the National Assembly		Andrey Lukanov (1990)	Chairperson of the National Assembly (1990)	Independent
1		Zhelyu Zhelev; Желю Желев; 1935–2015 (Lived: 79 years)	1 August 1990	22 January 1997	Andrey Lukanov (1990); Dimitar Popov (1990–1991); Philip Dimitrov (1991–1992); Lyuben Berov (1992–1994); Reneta Indzhova (1994–1995); Zhan Videnov (1995–1997)	Chairman of the Union of Democratic Forces (1989–1990)	Union of Democratic Forces
1		Zhelyu Zhelev; Желю Желев; 1935–2015 (Lived: 79 years)	July-August 1990 1992 – 52.8%, 2,738,436		Andrey Lukanov (1990); Dimitar Popov (1990–1991); Philip Dimitrov (1991–1992); Lyuben Berov (1992–1994); Reneta Indzhova (1994–1995); Zhan Videnov (1995–1997)	Chairman of the Union of Democratic Forces (1989–1990)	Union of Democratic Forces
2		Petar Stoyanov; Петър Стоянов; Born 1952 (74 years old)	22 January 1997	22 January 2002	Zhan Videnov (1997); Stefan Sofiyanski (1997); Ivan Kostov (1997–2001); Simeon Sakskoburggotski (2001–2002)	Vice Chairman of the Union of Democratic Forces (1995–1996)	Union of Democratic Forces
2		Petar Stoyanov; Петър Стоянов; Born 1952 (74 years old)	1996 – 59.7%, 2,502,517		Zhan Videnov (1997); Stefan Sofiyanski (1997); Ivan Kostov (1997–2001); Simeon Sakskoburggotski (2001–2002)	Vice Chairman of the Union of Democratic Forces (1995–1996)	Union of Democratic Forces
3		Georgi Parvanov; Георги Първанов; Born 1957 (69 years old)	22 January 2002	22 January 2012	Simeon Sakskoburggotski (2002–2005); Sergei Stanishev (2005–2009); Boyko Borisov (2009–2012)	Chairman of the Bulgarian Socialist Party (1996–2001)	Bulgarian Socialist Party
3		Georgi Parvanov; Георги Първанов; Born 1957 (69 years old)	2001 – 54.1%, 2,043,443 2006 – 75.9%, 2,050,488		Simeon Sakskoburggotski (2002–2005); Sergei Stanishev (2005–2009); Boyko Borisov (2009–2012)	Chairman of the Bulgarian Socialist Party (1996–2001)	Bulgarian Socialist Party
4		Rosen Plevneliev; Росен Плевнелиев; Born 1964 (62 years old)	22 January 2012	22 January 2017	Boyko Borisov (2012–2013); Marin Raykov (2013); Plamen Oresharski (2013–2014); Georgi Bliznashki (2014); Boyko Borisov (2014–2017)	Minister of Regional Development and Public Works (2009–2011)	GERB
4		Rosen Plevneliev; Росен Плевнелиев; Born 1964 (62 years old)	2011 – 52.6%, 1,698,136		Boyko Borisov (2012–2013); Marin Raykov (2013); Plamen Oresharski (2013–2014); Georgi Bliznashki (2014); Boyko Borisov (2014–2017)	Minister of Regional Development and Public Works (2009–2011)	GERB
5		Rumen Radev; Румен Радев; Born 1963 (63 years old)	22 January 2017	23 January 2026 (Note: Resigned from office)	Boyko Borisov (2017); Ognyan Gerdzhikov (2017); Boyko Borisov (2017–2021); Stefan Yanev (2021); Kiril Petkov (2021–2022); Galab Donev (2022–2023); Nikolai Denkov (2023–2024); Dimitar Glavchev (2024–2025); Rosen Zhelyazkov (2025–2026)	Bulgarian Air Force commander (2014–2016)	Independent
5		Rumen Radev; Румен Радев; Born 1963 (63 years old)	2016 – 59.4%, 2,049,260; 2021 – 66.7%, 1,539,650		Boyko Borisov (2017); Ognyan Gerdzhikov (2017); Boyko Borisov (2017–2021); Stefan Yanev (2021); Kiril Petkov (2021–2022); Galab Donev (2022–2023); Nikolai Denkov (2023–2024); Dimitar Glavchev (2024–2025); Rosen Zhelyazkov (2025–2026)	Bulgarian Air Force commander (2014–2016)	Independent
6		Iliana Iotova; Илияна Йотова; Born 1964 (62 years old)	23 January 2026 (Note: Succeeded to the presidency upon the resignation of Rumen Radev)	Incumbent	Rosen Zhelyazkov (2026); Andrey Gyurov (2026); Rumen Radev (2026–)	Vice President of Bulgaria	Bulgarian Socialist Party
6		Iliana Iotova; Илияна Йотова; Born 1964 (62 years old)	2026 – 57.6%, 1,093,852		Rosen Zhelyazkov (2026); Andrey Gyurov (2026); Rumen Radev (2026–)	Vice President of Bulgaria	Bulgarian Socialist Party

== See also ==
- List of Bulgarian monarchs
- List of Bulgarian regents
- List of first deputy chairmen of the State Council of Bulgaria
- List of heads of government of Bulgaria
- List of heads of state of Bulgaria
- Politics of Bulgaria
- Vice President of Bulgaria
