= Petar Stoyanov =

President of Bulgaria from 1997 to 2002

- Петър Стоянов
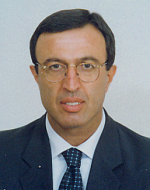
- Official portrait, 2005

President of Bulgaria
- In office 22 January 1997 – 22 January 2002
- Prime Minister: See list: Zhan Videnov; Stefan Sofiyanski; Ivan Kostov; Simeon Sakskoburggotski
- Vice President: Todor Kavaldzhiev
- Preceded by: Zhelyu Zhelev
- Succeeded by: Georgi Parvanov
Other offices
Leader of the Union of Democratic Forces
In office 1 October 2005 – 22 May 2007
Preceded by	Nadezhda Neynsky
Succeeded by	Plamen Yurukov
Member of the National Assembly
In office 11 July 2005 – 14 September 2007
Constituency	16th MMC - Plovdiv
In office 12 January 1995 – 11 November 1996
Constituency	16th MMC - Plovdiv
Deputy Minister of Justice
In office 8 November 1991 – 30 December 1992
Prime Minister	Philip Dimitrov
Minister	Svetoslav Luchnikov

Personal details
- Born: Petar Stefanov Stoyanov; 25 May 1952 (age 74) Plovdiv, PR Bulgaria
- Party: SDS (1989–1997; 2002–2007)
- Other political affiliations: Independent (1997–2002)
- Spouse: Antonina Stoyanova (m. 1978)
- Children: Stefan (born 1979); Teofana (born 1990)
- Education: Sofia University (LL.B, LL.M)
- Occupation: Statesman; politician; lawyer

Petar Stefanov Stoyanov (Note: [ˈpɛtɐr ˈstɛfɐnof stoˈjanof]) (Bulgarian: Петър Стефанов Стоянов, born 25 May 1952) is a Bulgarian statesman and politician who served as the president of Bulgaria from 1997 to 2002. A member of the Union of Democratic Forces, he won the second democratic election in modern Bulgarian history. Throughout Stoyanov’s presidency, Bulgaria made substantial progress in its efforts of joining NATO and the European Union.

== Biography ==
Stoyanov was born on 25 May 1952, in Plovdiv, Bulgaria. After graduating from secondary school, Stoyanov entered the Saint Kliment Ohridski University of Sofia law faculty where he graduated with honors in 1976. He practiced civil law in Plovdiv through the next fifteen years. In addition to his mother tongue Bulgarian, Stoyanov also speaks English and German.

Stoyanov entered politics in 1990, shortly after the political changes in Bulgaria at the end of 1989. He co-founded and chaired a Democracy Club in Plovdiv and later that same year became spokesman of the Plovdiv Coordinating Council of the Union of Democratic Forces (UDF), a new Bulgarian coalition in opposition to the former ruling political parties (BKP and BZNS).

In 1991 Stoyanov joined the country's first post-communist government as Deputy Minister of Justice. In 1993 the UDF led government failed a vote of no confidence and was replaced. In May 1993 Stoyanov became a President of the UDF Legal Council.

In 1994, he was elected Member of Parliament and was chosen as Deputy Chairman of the UDF Parliamentary Group, in addition to being Deputy Chairman of the Parliamentary Commission on Youth, Sports, and Tourism. In 1995 he became Deputy Chairman of UDF, responsible for domestic policy.

=== Presidency ===
On 1 June 1996 Petar Stoyanov won the 1996 ODS presidential primary with 66% of the 870,000 votes cast, defeating incumbent Zhelyu Zhelev. He received a plurality of votes in the first round of the presidential election, ahead of the socialist candidate Ivan Marazov and Bulgarian Business Bloc founder and leader George Ganchev. In the second round he defeated Marazov by a margin of 19.5%.

Stoyanov was sworn in as President on 19 January 1997 and stepped into office on 22 January 1997. He was the first Bulgarian Head of State after the Second World War, who had never been a member of the Bulgarian Communist Party.

At the beginning of his tenure, Petar Stoyanov played a significant role in one of the most dramatic crisis in the modern history of Bulgaria. After the resignation of Prime Minister Zhan Videnov, the new leader of the BSP, Georgi Parvanov and Videnov's proposed successor as Prime Minister, Nikolay Dobrev. In response tens of thousands of citizens came out in protest demanding that early elections be held instead. On 4 February, Georgi Parvanov and Nikolay Dobrev visited the newly elected Head of State with a proposed Cabinet. With a majority in the 37th National Assembly, the BSP had the ability to approve the new Cabinet, however President Stoyanov advised that to prevent further unrest the mandate be returned instead. On the same day, 4 February 1997, he summoned the National Security Consultative Council, which included representatives from all parties represented in Parliament. During this Consultative Council Nikolay Dobrev decided to give up on trying to a new government, and new elections were scheduled. President Stoyanov appointed a Caretaker Government headed by Sofia Mayor Stefan Sofianski, who was a member of the Union of Democratic Forces. Subsequently the UDF received a majority in Parliament and formed a government, which would go on to be Bulgaria's first post 1989 government to serve a full term (1997-2001).

At the request of President Stoyanov, the Caretaker Government officially submitted a request for Bulgaria's membership in NATO. Petar Stoyanov also played an important role in resolving the Kosovo crisis, strongly supporting the Alliance.

During his presidency Bulgaria entered into active negotiations for accession to the European Union and ratified the Council of Europe Framework Convention for the Protection of National Minorities and became a non-permanent member of the United Nations Security Council.

The original manuscript of Istoriya Slavyanobolgarskaya was returned to the monastery library of the Zograf Monastery on 12 January 1998 at his request.

At Stoyanov's invitation, a sitting US President visited Bulgaria for the first time, when Bill Clinton made a historic three-day visit between 21 and 23 November 1999.

During his term in office Stoyanov became the first Head of state in the world to sign a law with an electronic signature. Petar Stoyanov has been a member of the Internet Society - Bulgaria, since 21 July 2000.

=== 2001 Presidential Election ===
Petar Stoyanov ran for a second term in 2001, but lost in the second round to Georgi Parvanov, despite the fact that he was initially leading in the polls.

During a TV debate with the other candidates, Stoyanov produced a classified file containing information about one of them, Bogomil Bonev and his alleged contacts with persons of dubious repute. One of the presenters, Ivo Indzhev read it out, while the other one, Svetla Petrova, stated that Stoyanov "risked the winner of the dispute being Georgi Parvanov", the socialist candidate who was absent. It is believed that Stoyanov's actions regarding this classified document deterred many swing voters, who were thus inclined to support Parvanov, due to his more moderate behaviour.

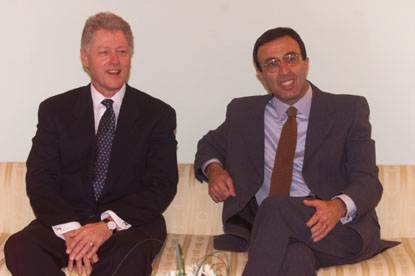
President Petar Stoyanov meets with U.S. President Bill Clinton

During the campaign Petar Stoyanov did not receive the full support of any political party. The Movement for Rights and Freedoms (a party mostly supported by the ethnic Turkish minority in Bulgaria) supported the candidate of the Bulgarian Socialist Party, Georgi Parvanov, in the second round. Prior to the start of the campaign, Stoyanov had been supported by the UDF, however the leaders of the party only made ambiguous statements during the campaign itself, which voters were baffled by. NDSV, the new party of former monarch Simeon Saxe-Coburg-Gotha, which had won a majority of seats in the parliamentary election earlier that year, had been expected to support Stoyanov. However, the leader of the movement then prime minister Simeon Saxe-Coburg Gotha announced that he would not vote in the second round, motivated by the desire to save the state the cost of the trip to the village of Banya, where he was registered and this disheartened his followers and voters.

Petar Stoyanov finished second in the first round of voting with 34.9%, behind the socialist candidate Georgi Parvanov with 36.3%, and ahead of Bogomil Bonev with 19.2%. Stoyanov lost the runoff to Parvanov by a margin of 8.3%.

Petar Stoyanov's loss in this election, alongside poor performance in the earlier parliamentary election, marked the beginning of a period of decline for the Union of Democratic Forces.

=== Later political career ===
In September 2004, Stoyanov was appointed Special Envoy for Moldova by the OSCE Chairman-in-Office.

In 2005, Stoyanov returned to active politics. He was elected as a member of the 40th National Assembly in the parliamentary election held that year. He then became a member of the European Integration Committee and a member of State Administration Affairs Committee. Because of the UDF's poor result (8.4% of the popular vote and 20 out of 240 seats), he became a vocal opponent of party leader Nadezhda Mihailova. On October 1, 2005 the UDF National Conference elected him as Chairman of the party.

On 20 May 2007 the first European Parliament election in Bulgaria was held. Stoyanov – who led the UDF list – failed to get elected as UDF fell 1% short of the 5.66% effective electoral threshold. This resulted in his resignation from the leadership of the Union of Democratic Forces on 22 May 2007.

=== Other ===
Stoyanov serves as an Honorary Co-Chair for the World Justice Project. The World Justice Project works to lead a global, multidisciplinary effort to strengthen the Rule of Law for the development of communities of opportunity and equity. In 2002, as a fellow of The German Marshall Fund, Petar Stoyanov delivered lectures in the US at John F. Kennedy School of Government at Harvard University, New York University, American Bar Association (Washington, DC) and other universities.

In 2022 Stoyanov, together with Iuliana Metodieva and Mitko Novkov of Association for Human Rights Marginalia launched a campaign to honor volunteers and organizations who help refugees from Ukraine during the refugee crisis in Bulgaria following the Russian invasion of Ukraine. The grand prize for overall contribution was given to Olena Kotseva from the Mati Ukraine association.

== Family ==
He is married to Antonina Stoyanova and has a son Stefan (born 1979) and a daughter Fany (born 1990). His younger brother, Emil Stoyanov, is a former MEP from GERB.

== Honours and awards ==
- Slovakia: Grand Cross (or 1st Class) of the Order of the White Double Cross (1997)
- Romania: Grand Cross with Sash of the Order of the Star of Romania (1998)
- Austria: Grand Star of the Decoration of Honour for Services to the Republic of Austria (1999)
- Spain: Collar of the Order of Civil Merit (1999)
- Denmark: Knight of the Order of the Elephant (2000)
- Palestine: Order of Bethlehem (2000)

Political offices
Preceded by Zhelyu Zhelev	President of Bulgaria; 1997–2002	Succeeded by Georgi Parvanov
