= George Ganchev =

Bulgarian politician (1939–2019)

Personal details
- Born: Georgi Petrushev; August 29, 1939 Plovdiv, Bulgaria
- Died: August 19, 2019 (aged 79) Sofia, Bulgaria
- Party: Independent (2001–2019) George Ganchev's Bloc (2001) Bulgarian Business Bloc (1990–2001) Union of Democratic Forces (1989–1990) Bulgarian Communist Party (before 1989)
- Profession: Businessman, politician, showman

George Ganchev (born Georgi Petrushev) (Bulgarian: Жорж Ганчев [ˈʒɔrʃ ˈɡant͡ʃɛf], born Георги Петрушев [ɡɛˈɔrɡi pɛtˈruʃɛf]; August 29, 1939 – August 19, 2019) was a Bulgarian politician and founder of the now-defunct political parties Bulgarian Business Bloc and George Ganchev's Bloc.

== Biography ==
Petroushev was born on August 29, 1939, in Plovdiv. He studied at the Sports Academy in Bulgaria. In the early 1960s he married an Englishwoman and emigrated from Bulgaria. Some sources put the year in which he became an expatriate as 1967. He graduated from the British Academy of Fencing (where he also served as the head coach of the London Fencing Club from 1968 to 1973) and the Hollywood Theatrical Institute. Ganchev was also World Professional Fencing Champion (saber individual champion while representing Great Britain) in 1970 and 1974. Afterwards he committed himself to directing, play-writing, film and play producing in Great Britain and the United States. During the mid-1970s, he taught swordfighting at the American Academy of Dramatic Arts in Pasadena, CA.

== Political career ==
After Todor Zhivkov was removed from power on November 10, 1989, Ganchev returned to Bulgaria and took part in founding the Union of Democratic Forces (SDS).

He later founded the Bulgarian Business Bloc in 1990 and was elected its chairman. The party contested the 1991 parliamentary elections but won only 73,379 votes (1.3%); failing to cross the 4% electoral threshold.

Ganchev ran for president the following year with Petar Beron (ex-leader of the SDS) as his running mate. They finished 3rd with 16.8% of the popular vote; behind the SDS candidate (and winner) Zhelyu Zhelev and the socialist endorsed Velko Valkanov.

The Bulgarian Business Bloc (BBB) had a breakthrough in the 1994 parliamentary elections, winning 4.7% of the popular vote and winning 13 seats. Ganchev was elected as a member of parliament (sitting from 1995 to 2001).

Ganchev ran again for president again in 1996, this time with Arlin Antonov as his running mate. They finished 3rd, but with 21.9% of the popular vote this time.

In the 1997 parliamentary elections the BBB won 4.9% of the vote, but was down to only 12 seats.

Before the 2001 parliamentary elections he left to form a new party, George Ganchev's Bloc, but the new party was a failure, winning only 17,272 (0.38%) votes. However, the new party had clearly eclipsed the old BBB. His old party polled only 162 votes. The BBB disbanded later that year.

Ganchev ran for president a third time in 2001 but finished 5th with only 3.4% of the popular vote. His new party disbanded soon after and Ganchev retired from his political career.

However, he founded a National Patriotic Union (Bulgarian: Национално патриотично обединение) in 2004 and the new political entity participated in the 2005 Parliamentary election as part of the Coalition of the Rose (Bulgarian: Коалиция на розата), though it was unable to cross the 4% threshold.

In 2012, he returned to politics once again, reviving his National Patriotic Union.

He ran for president a fourth and final time in 2016 as the candidate from the Christian Social Union. He received 27,928 votes, or 0.73% of the total ballots.

== Bulgarian State Security ==
He was a Bulgarian State Security agent during the Cold War, from 1970 to 1990, in Department II (worked in universities and among students), division 19, branch 2. His membership in that agency was publicly disclosed on April 26, 2013, as part of a disclosure program started by the Bulgarian parliament on April 5, 2007.

== Later career ==
Ganchev was the writer, producer & MC of "George in Action" that aired on Bulgarian TV from 2000 to 2005.

== Personal life ==
Ganchev and his English wife Wendy-Ann Hutson had two daughters. Shortly after his return to Bulgaria following the collapse of the totalitarian system in 1989, Ganchev began a long-term relationship with Valentina Shishkova, known as Shushi. His hobbies included horses, music and poetry. Ganchev formerly held US citizenship, which led to a few controversies regarding his eligibility to contest Bulgarian elections. He died on August 19, 2019, at the age of 79.
