= 1997 Bulgarian protests =

Protest in Bulgaria during 1996 to 1997

The 1997 Bulgarian protests or the Videnov winter, also known as the Bulgarian winter or the January events, was a wave of violent demonstrations and strikes nationwide in Bulgaria for a month in January 1997, fuelled by devaluation and economic turmoil, which saw inflation rise to 300%. Following the resignation of the BSP government of Zhan Videnov countrywide weekly demonstrations began demanding new elections rather than the appointment of a new BSP government. Nationwide strikes escalated into violence as protesters even stormed government buildings. On 4 February 1997 the BSP gave up on trying to appoint a new government and new elections were held instead.

== Timeline ==
- 21–23 December 1996: During the XLIV congress of the BSP, Zhan Videnov announces his resignation as prime minister and leader of the party, due to the economic crisis. Georgi Parvanov is elected chairman of the party.
- 28 December 1996: The Bulgarian Parliament accepts Videnov's resignation.
- 8 January 1997 The Democratic Left parliamentary group nominates interior minister Nikolay Dobrev to succeed Videnov.
- 10 January 1997: Incumbent President Zhelyu Zhelev refuses to grant the first mandate for government formation to the largest parliamentary group (Democratic Left). Protesters in Sofia surround and storm the building of the National Assembly, then assault and injure members of parliament who are evacuating parliament. Police disperse the protesters, leaving tens of people injured.
- 22 January 1997: Petar Stoyanov takes office as the second President of Bulgaria.
- 28 January 1997: In accordance with the Constitution, President Stoyanov grants the first mandate for government formation to the Democratic Left.
- 4 February 1997: BSP leader Parvanov and PM candidate Dobrev return the mandate, giving up their right to form a new government. Subsequently snap elections are scheduled.
- 12 February 1997: President Stoyanov appoints an interim government, led by Sofia mayor Stefan Sofiyanski. One of the first decisions it takes is implementing a Currency board ( and applies for NATO membership.

== See also ==
- 2020 Bulgarian protests
