= Svetoslav Luchnikov =

Bulgarian jurist and politician

Personal details
- Born: 3 February 1922 Rousse, Bulgaria
- Died: 27 October 2002 (aged 80)
- Profession: Jurist, Politician

Svetoslav Denchev Luchnikov (family name occasionally also transliterated as Lutschnikov) (Bulgarian: Светослав Денчев Лучников) (3 February 1922 – 27 October 2002) was a Bulgarian jurist and politician who served as the Minister of Justice and Deputy Prime Minister in the Dimitrov cabinet between 8 November 1991 and 30 December 1992.

== Biography ==
He was a graduate of Sofia University, where he earned a degree in legal studies. Luchnikov joined the UDF shortly after the collapse of the communist system in Bulgaria and was a member of four National Parliaments (36th /1991 — 1994/; 37th /1995 — 1997/; 38th /1997 — 2001/; 39th /2001 — until his death/). He was one of the key figures behind the drafting of the restitution law in Bulgaria.
