= Valkanov =

Valkanov (Bulgarian: Вълканов) is a Bulgarian masculine surname – its feminine counterpart being Valkanova (Вълканова) – and may refer to:

- Alexandar Valkanov (1904–1972), Bulgarian botanist and zoologist
- Hristo Valkanov (1874–1905), Bulgarian revolutionary
- Rossen Valkanov, American economist
- Velko Valkanov (1927–2016), Bulgarian lawyer and politician
- Yanko Valkanov (born 1982), Bulgarian footballer
