= George Ganchev's Bloc =

Bulgarian political party

George Ganchev's Bloc (Bulgarian: Блокът на Жорж Ганчев, Blokit na Zhorzh Ganchev, BZG) was a political party in Bulgaria.

== History ==
The party was founded by George Ganchev ahead of the 2001 parliamentary elections after he left the Bulgarian Business Bloc (BBB). Whilst the BBB had won twelve seats in the 1997 elections, the new party received only 0.4% of the vote and failed to win a seat, whilst the BBB received just 162 votes, losing all 12 seats.

In the presidential elections later in the year, Ganchev ran, but received just 3.4% of the vote.
