= Alexander Bozhkov =

Bulgarian politician

- Александър Божков

Industry Minister of Bulgaria
- In office 1997–1999

Personal details
- Born: September 9, 1951; Sofia, Bulgaria
- Died: September 23, 2009 (aged 58); Sofia, Bulgaria
- Occupation: Politician

Alexander Bozhkov (Bulgarian: Александър Божков) (9 August 1951 – 23 August 2009) was Deputy Prime Minister and Industry Minister of Bulgaria from 1997 to 1999. Bozhkov played a major part in setting the general parameters of the economics policy of the Ivan Kostov government and was influential in instituting privatization. He was born in Sofia and died there on August 23, 2009 after years of prolonged illness, most recently cancer. He was 58.
