= Order 8-September =

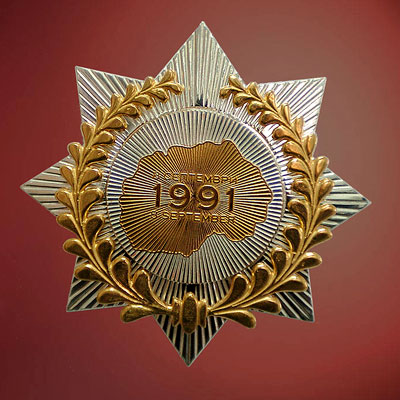

Awarded by the President of North Macedonia
- Type: Single grade order
- Established: 27 June 2002
- Country: North Macedonia
- Ribbon
- Eligibility: All
- Status: Currently awarded

Precedence
- Next (higher): Order of the Republic of North Macedonia
- Next (lower): Order "Ilinden-1903"

Order 8-September is a high distinction of North Macedonia. It is named in honor of 8 September, the Independence Day of North Macedonia. The awards are basic stellate shape with dimensions of 81 mm. It is awarded to Heads of State, parliaments and governments, senior officials and foreign diplomats, the top officials of international organizations, and institutions for outstanding merit in establishing, developing and strengthening friendly relations and peaceful cooperation among relevant equitable states, organizations or institutions and North Macedonia, as well as for outstanding contribution to the strengthening of its international position and reputation.

== Recipients ==
- Robert Badinter – President of the Constitutional Council of France
- Bronisław Komorowski – President of Poland
- Viktor Orbán – Prime Minister of Hungary
- Zhelyu Zhelev – President of Bulgaria
- Roman Herzog – President of Germany
- Hamad bin Khalifa Al Thani – Emir of Qatar
- Uffe Ellemann-Jensen – Minister for Foreign Affairs of Denmark
- Nikola Kljusev – Prime Minister of North Macedonia
- (United States) Christopher R. Hill – First U.S. Ambassador to North Macedonia
- (Canada) John Bitove Sr – Businessman who led movement for Independence
- Jordan Mijalkov – Minister of North Macedonia
- Miloš Zeman – President of the Czech Republic
- (North Macedonia) Olivera Nakovska-Bikova – Paralympian shooter
- Andrzej Duda – President of Poland
