= 1994 Bulgarian parliamentary election =

| ← 1991 | 18 December 1994 | 1997 → |
- All 240 seats in the National Assembly; 121 seats needed for a majority
- Turnout: 75.23% (▼8.64pp)
| Party | Leader | Vote % | Seats | +/– |
|---|---|---|---|---|
| DL | Zhan Videnov | 43.50 | 125 | +19 |
| SDS | Philip Dimitrov | 24.23 | 69 | −41 |
| BZNS–DP | Anastasia Mozer | 6.51 | 18 | New |
| DPS | Ahmed Dogan | 5.44 | 15 | −9 |
| BBB | George Ganchev | 4.73 | 13 | +13 |
This lists parties that won seats. See the complete results below.
Results by constituency
| Prime Minister before | Prime Minister after |
|---|---|
| Reneta Indzhova; Independent (Indzhova Government) | Zhan Videnov; DL (Videnov Government) |

Parliamentary elections were held in Bulgaria on 18 December 1994. The Democratic Left, the core of which was the Bulgarian Socialist Party, won 125 of the 240 seats, enough to govern without the support of parties from outside the coalition. Voter turnout was 75.3%. Following the election, Socialist Party leader Zhan Videnov became prime minister.

== Results ==
| Party | Votes | % | Seats | +/– |
|---|---|---|---|---|
| Democratic Left | 2,262,943 | 43.50 | 125 | +19 |
| Union of Democratic Forces | 1,260,374 | 24.23 | 69 | −41 |
| People's Union (BZNS–DP) | 338,478 | 6.51 | 18 | +18 |
| Movement for Rights and Freedoms | 283,094 | 5.44 | 15 | −9 |
| Bulgarian Business Bloc | 245,849 | 4.73 | 13 | +13 |
| Democratic Alternative for the Republic (GOR–BSDP–ZP–ASLP) | 197,057 | 3.79 | 0 | 0 |
| Bulgarian Communist Party | 78,606 | 1.51 | 0 | 0 |
| New Choice Union | 77,641 | 1.49 | 0 | New |
| Patriotic Union | 74,350 | 1.43 | 0 | 0 |
| Kingdom of Bulgaria Federation | 73,205 | 1.41 | 0 | 0 |
| Kingdom of Bulgaria National Movement for Crowned Democracy | 40,642 | 0.78 | 0 | New |
| Kingdom of Bulgaria' Union of Monarchist Forces | 31,884 | 0.61 | 0 | New |
| Bulgarian National Radical Party | 27,853 | 0.54 | 0 | 0 |
| Democratic Party of Justice | 24,023 | 0.46 | 0 | New |
| Movement for the Protection of Pensioners, the Unemployed, and Underprivileged Citizens | 18,934 | 0.36 | 0 | New |
| Party of Democratic Change | 14,145 | 0.27 | 0 | New |
| Bulgarian Agrarian National Union – 'Turnovo Constitution' National Block | 13,176 | 0.25 | 0 | New |
| Organisation of Invalids and Underprivileged Citizens of Bulgaria | 12,978 | 0.25 | 0 | 0 |
| Forward Bulgaria Movement | 10,105 | 0.19 | 0 | New |
| Era-3 | 8,923 | 0.17 | 0 | – |
| Christian Democratic Union | 8,246 | 0.16 | 0 | New |
| Free Democratic Party | 7,463 | 0.14 | 0 | 0 |
| Transfiguration Forum | 7,447 | 0.14 | 0 | New |
| Democratic Party of Bulgaria | 6,439 | 0.12 | 0 | New |
| Alliance for Socialism | 6,019 | 0.12 | 0 | New |
| Bulgarian League for the Protection of the Rights of People and Citizens | 5,957 | 0.11 | 0 | New |
| Union of Justice | 5,029 | 0.10 | 0 | New |
| Bulgarian Revolutionary Party of Youth | 4,703 | 0.09 | 0 | 0 |
| Free Co-operative Party | 4,300 | 0.08 | 0 | 0 |
| Union of Free Democrats | 3,999 | 0.08 | 0 | New |
| Bulgarian Workers' Social Democratic Party | 3,827 | 0.07 | 0 | 0 |
| BRSP – Bulgarian Worker-Rural Party | 3,661 | 0.07 | 0 | 0 |
| Bulgarian Fatherland Party – 'National Union' | 3,652 | 0.07 | 0 | 0 |
| Bulgarian National Union | 3,565 | 0.07 | 0 | New |
| Party of Proprietors of Bulgaria | 3,558 | 0.07 | 0 | 0 |
| Front of Progressive Forces of Bulgaria | 3,457 | 0.07 | 0 | New |
| National Liberal Party–Stefan Stambolov | 2,876 | 0.06 | 0 | 0 |
| Democratic Party of Labour | 2,450 | 0.05 | 0 | New |
| Republican Party of Bulgaria | 1,973 | 0.04 | 0 | New |
| Bulgarian Democratic Party for European and World States | 1,924 | 0.04 | 0 | 0 |
| Bulgarian Eagle Party | 1,605 | 0.03 | 0 | 0 |
| Union of Non-partisan Guarantors | 1,357 | 0.03 | 0 | 0 |
| Union of Bulgarian Communities | 1,165 | 0.02 | 0 | New |
| Civic Initiative DGI–SDS Movement | 372 | 0.01 | 0 | New |
| Unity Party | 143 | 0.00 | 0 | New |
| Alliance of the Nation – Movement of the Downtrodden | 57 | 0.00 | 0 | New |
| Independents | 12,561 | 0.24 | 0 | 0 |
| Total | 5,202,065 | 100.00 | 240 | 0 |
| Valid votes | 5,202,065 | 98.82 | | |
| Invalid/blank votes | 62,383 | 1.18 | | |
| Total votes | 5,264,448 | 100.00 | | |
| Registered voters/turnout | 6,997,954 | 75.23 | | |
Source: University of Essex
