= Evgeni Bakardzhiev =

Bulgarian politician (1955–2021)

Personal details
- Born: 10 February 1955 Sofia, Bulgaria
- Died: 29 June 2021 (aged 66) Sofia
- Profession: Politician

Evgeni Stefanov Bakardzhiev (Bulgarian: Евгений Стефанов Бакърджиев) (10 February 1955 – 29 June 2021) was a Bulgarian politician who served as vice-Prime Minister and Minister of Regional Development and Public Works between 1997 and 1999.

== Life ==
During the communist period, Bakardzhiev received an education in a technical field, specializing in Industrial and Civil Construction.

In the 1990s, following the beginning of the democratic transition, he entered politics as part of the Bulgarian Agrarian National Union "Nikola Petkov" (Bulgarian: Българския земеделски народен съюз „Никола Петков") and later became an influential member of the UDF, characterized as being among the "third wave" politicians in the party. Bakardzhiev was a deputy in the 38th and 39th National Parliaments.

In November 2001, following criticisms leveled at the UDF leadership, he was expelled from the party. On 1 December 2001, Bakardzhiev established the Bulgarian Democratic Union "Radicals" (Bulgarian: Български демократичен съюз "Радикали").

Bakardzhiev was married three times. In addition to his native Bulgarian, he was conversant in Russian and English.

He was particularly responsible for the destruction of the Georgi Dimitrov Mausoleum in Sofia. As he claimed, he made this from the bottom of his heart, because this building played highly divisive role amongst the nation.

== Books ==
Prodanov, Vasil; Todorov, Antoniy; Avramov, Yosif; Ivanova, Vanya (2009). Българският парламент и преходът (1st ed.). Sofia: Ciela. ISBN 978-954-28-0352-2.
