= 1996 Bulgarian presidential election =

Presidential election in Bulgaria

← 1992	27 October 1996 (first round); 3 November 1996 (second round)	2001 →
- Turnout: 63.14% (first round); 61.45% (second round)
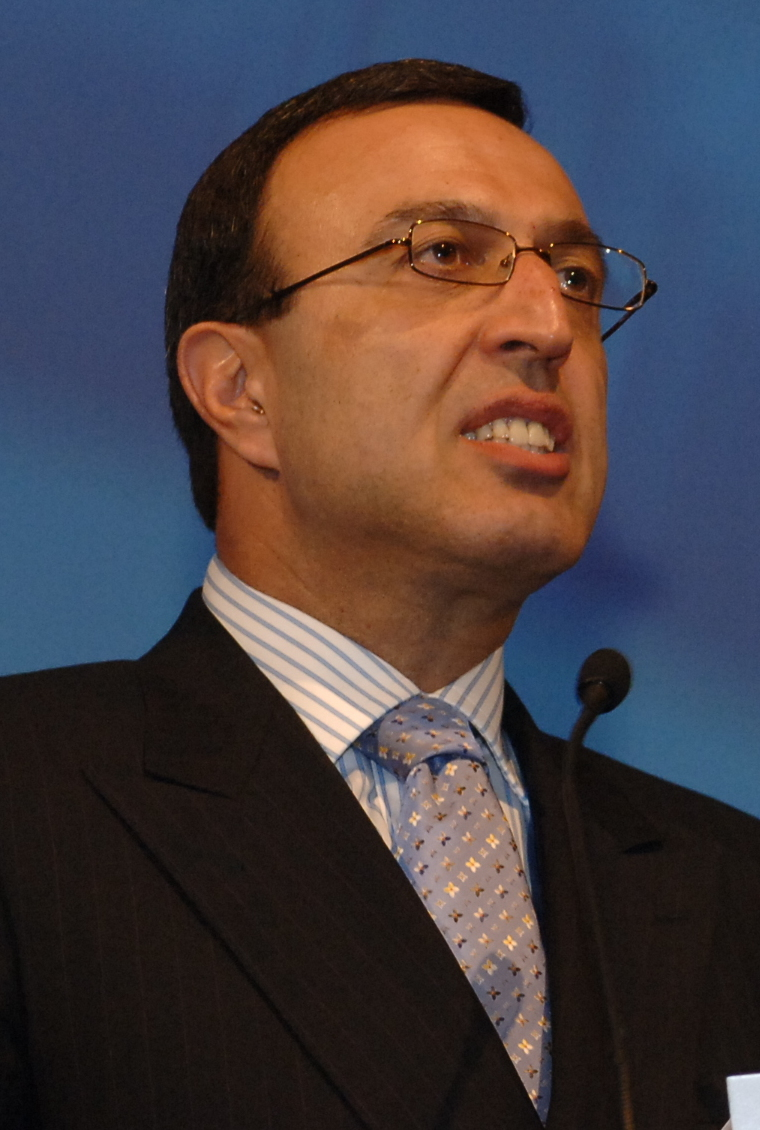
Nominee	Petar Stoyanov	Ivan Marazov
Party	ODS	BSP
Running mate	Todor Kavaldzhiev	Irina Bokova
Popular vote	2,502,517	1,687,242
Percentage	59.73%	40.27%
President before election
Zhelyu Zhelev
SDS
Elected President
Petar Stoyanov
ODS

Presidential elections were held in Bulgaria on 27 October 1996, with a second round on 3 November. A presidential primary was held earlier in 1996, which resulted in Petar Stoyanov of the United Democratic Forces being selected as the candidate of the three largest opposition parties. He won with 59.7% of the vote in the second round. Voter turnout was 63.3% in the first round and 61.8% in the second.

== Results ==
Candidate	Running mate	Party	First round		Second round	
Candidate	Running mate	Party	Votes	%	Votes	%
Petar Stoyanov	Todor Kavaldzhiev	United Democratic Forces	1,889,825	44.07	2,502,517	59.73
Ivan Marazov	Irina Bokova	Bulgarian Socialist Party	1,158,204	27.01	1,687,242	40.27
George Ganchev	Arlin Antonov	Bulgarian Business Bloc	937,686	21.87		
Aleksandar Tomov	Ludmil Marinchevski	Independent	135,571	3.16		
Hristo Boychev	Ivan Kulekov	Movement for the Protection of Retired Unemployed and Poor People	57,668	1.34		
Vera Ilieva	Iskra Atanasova	Bulgarian Communist Party	34,004	0.79		
Slavomir Tsankov	Dobri Dobrev	Union of Democratic Forces and Movements "Era 3"	22,724	0.53		
Ivan Stoyanov	Rumyana Yakimova	Democratic Party in Bulgaria	14,659	0.34		
Mincho Minchev	Pencho Penchev	Patriotic Party of Labour	13,567	0.32		
Mitko Dimitrov	Ignat Ignatov	Alliance for the Preservation of Bulgaria's Wealth	7,793	0.18		
Lyubomir Stefanov	Parush Karaivanov	Alternative Socialist Alliance	6,056	0.14		
Dimitar Markovski	Dimitrina Vuldzhieva	Free Cooperative Party	5,823	0.14		
Iliyan Nikolov	Sergey Nemtserov	Bulgarian National Ecological Party	4,920	0.11		
Total			4,288,500	100.00	4,189,759	100.00
Valid votes			4,288,500	99.33	4,189,759	99.40
Invalid/blank votes			28,908	0.67	25,416	0.60
Total votes			4,317,408	100.00	4,215,175	100.00
Registered voters/turnout			6,837,737	63.14	6,859,318	61.45
Source: President of Bulgaria
