= Bulgarian Business Bloc =

Bulgarian Business Bloc Български бизнес блок
- Abbreviation: BBB
- Founder: George Ganchev
- Founded: 10 December 1990
- Dissolved: 2001
- Ideology: Centrist populism

The Bulgarian Business Bloc (Bulgarian: Български бизнес блок, romanized: Bulgarski biznes blok, BBB) was a political party in Bulgaria.

== History ==
The party first participated in national elections in 1991, when it received 1.3% of the national vote in the parliamentary elections but failed to win a seat. In the presidential elections the following year, its candidate George Ganchev finished third with 17% of the vote.

In the 1994 parliamentary elections the party increased its vote share to 4.7% and won 13 seats in the National Assembly. Ganchev was the party's candidate for the 1996 presidential elections, again finishing third with 22% of the vote. Despite increase its vote share to 5.3% in the 1997 parliamentary elections, the party was reduced to 12 seats.

Shortly before the 2001 parliamentary elections Ganchev left the party to establish George Ganchev's Bloc. The split resulted in the BBB receiving just 162 votes, losing all its seats in the National Assembly, whilst the George Ganchev's Bloc also received less than 1% of the vote and failed to win a seat.
