= Ivan Kostov =

Prime Minister of Bulgaria from 1997 to 2001

- Иван Костов
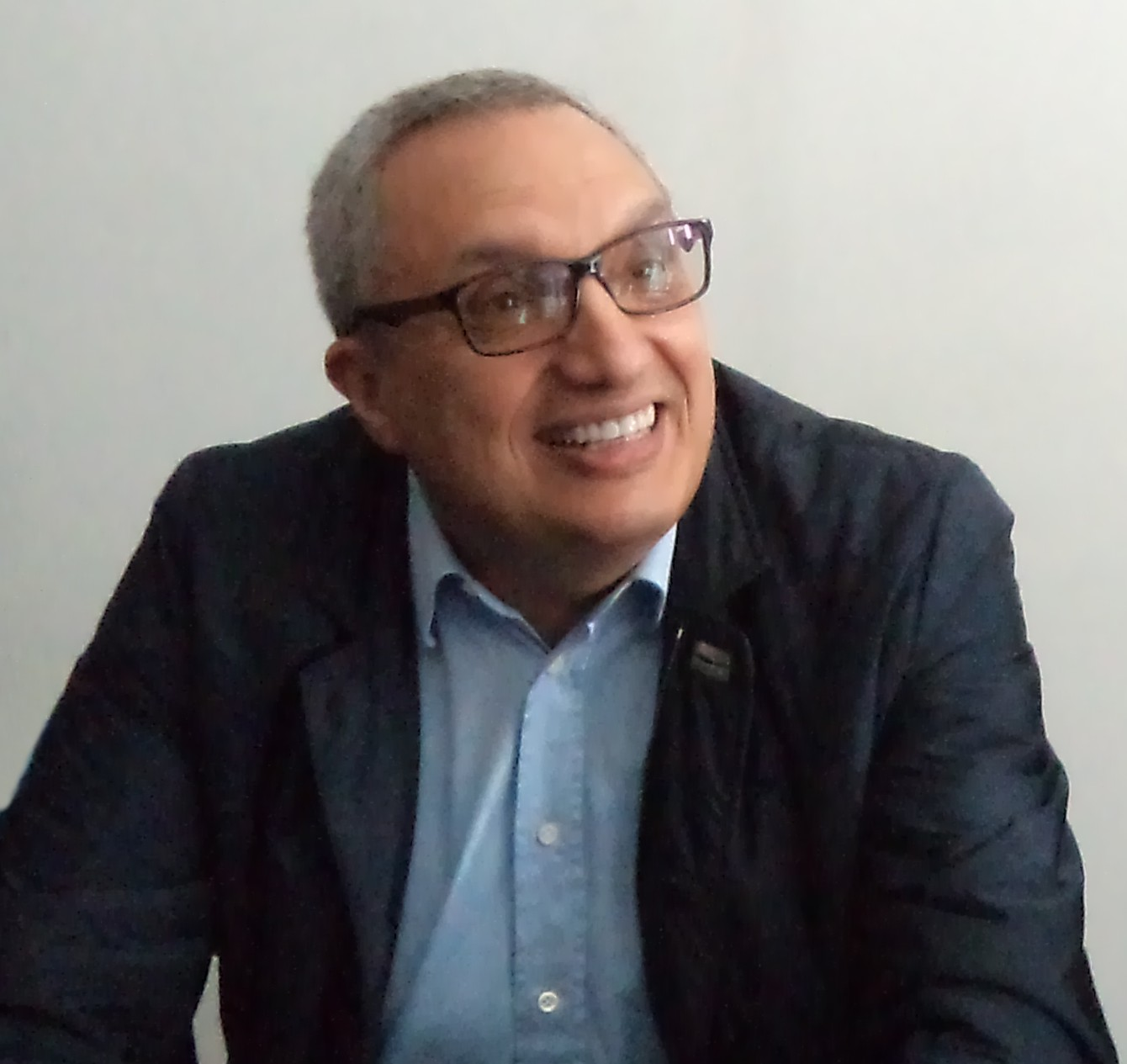
- Kostov in 2013

Prime Minister of Bulgaria
- In office 21 May 1997 – 24 July 2001
- President: Petar Stoyanov
- Deputy: Evgeni Bakardzhiev; Veselin Metodiev; Alexander Bozhkov
- Preceded by: Stefan Sofiyanski
- Succeeded by: Simeon Sakskoburggotski

Minister of Finance
- In office 20 December 1990 – 30 December 1992
- Prime Minister: Dimitar Popov; Philip Dimitrov
- Preceded by: Belcho Belchev
- Succeeded by: Stoyan Alexandrov
Senior political offices
Leader of the Democrats for Strong Bulgaria
In office 30 May 2004 – 13 May 2013
Preceded by	Position established
Succeeded by	Radan Kanev
Leader of the Union of Democratic Forces
In office 29 December 1994 – 26 June 2001
Preceded by	Philip Dimitrov
Succeeded by	Ekaterina Mihaylova
Parliamentary offices
Member of the National Assembly
In office 5 July 2001 – 14 March 2013
Constituency	16th MMC - Plovdiv (2001-2005); 23rd MMC - Sofia (2005-2013)
In office 12 January 1995 – 21 May 1997
Constituency	16th MMC - Plovdiv
Member of the 7th Grand National Assembly
In office 10 July 1990 – 20 December 1990
Preceded by	Position established
Succeeded by	Position abolished

Personal details
- Born: Ivan Yordanov Kostov; 23 December 1949 (age 76) Sofia, PR Bulgaria
- Party: Democrats for a Strong Bulgaria (since 2004)
- Other political affiliations: Union of Democratic Forces (until 2003)
- Spouse: Elena Kostova (m. 1974)
- Children: 2
- Education: University of National and World Economy; Sofia University
- Occupation: Politician; economist; lecturer; author

Ivan Yordanov Kostov (Bulgarian: Иван Йорданов Костов [iˈvan ˈkɔstof]) (born 23 December 1949) is a Bulgarian politician who served as Prime Minister of Bulgaria from 1997 to 2001. A member of the SDS party, which he led from 1994 to 2001, he was previously Minister of Finance from 1990 to 1992. Following his premiership, Kostov founded a new political party, the DSB, and served as Member of the National Assembly from 2001 to 2013.

Ivan Kostov graduated in Economics from the Karl Marx Higher Institute of Economics (today's University of National and World Economy) in Sofia in 1974, and later earned a Ph.D. in Mathematical Modeling of Economic Processes from Sofia University. He then worked as an associate professor at Sofia Technical University and entered politics after the collapse of the Berlin Wall and the fall of the Bulgarian communist leader, Todor Zhivkov. Kostov became an economic expert for the Union of Democratic Forces (UDF). His political career began as Member of Parliament in the 7th Grand National Assembly in 1990 (he was an MP from 1990 to 2013) and he went on to become Bulgaria's Finance Minister in the two consecutive governments of Dimitar Popov (December 1990 – October 1991) and Filip Dimitrov (November 1991 – December 1992).

== Chairman of the UDF and Prime Minister ==
Kostov was elected chairman of the UDF in 1994. During the winter of 1996/1997, mass protests took place against Bulgarian Socialist Party's government. The causes for the complete crisis were hyperinflation, unemployment and food shortages. The protests ultimately led to the fall of the socialist government. The UDF won the May 1997 elections, and Kostov became Bulgaria's Prime Minister, his cabinet eventually became the country's first post-communist government to serve its full 4-year term.

Kostov and his government implemented the currency board in Bulgaria, removed price controls and created a market economy, which put it on the path of sustainable economic growth. Under his government, other economic reforms were carried out, including privatization of state-owned enterprises on a large scale and the country started long-sought accession talks with the European Union (which Bulgaria joined on 1 January 2007).

In foreign affairs, Ivan Kostov followed a strongly pro-EU and pro-NATO course, putting the country on a firm path of integration with the EU and NATO. As a part of the pro-NATO stance of his government, during the war in Kosovo he showed leadership by allowing NATO but not Russia to use Bulgaria's airspace despite overwhelming opposition in Bulgaria to the NATO air campaign against Yugoslavia and daily protest marches led by the Bulgarian Socialist Party (the former Bulgarian Communist Party). This single act prevented Russia from resupplying its forces occupying Pristina airport, thus denying the Russians a foothold in Kosovo. This decision ensured the success of the NATO bombing of Yugoslavia and the Kosovo War and ultimately led to a visit to Sofia by US President Bill Clinton in 1999. Against the insistence of the United States, Kostov didn't allow refugees from Kosovo to enter Bulgaria, but arranged for them to be temporarily settled in the Republic of Macedonia instead.

Kostov's rule was characterized by media claims for massive corruption, none of which have been proven. A number of major Soviet era enterprises that were already bankrupt and in the process of liquidation were sold to the highest bidder below the price of their assets because of the tremendous debts these enterprises had. This was done to allow the new investor to save the jobs of the employees, who would otherwise have to immediately lose their job because these enterprises were in a procedure of liquidation to pay off their creditors. This sale under the book value of assets has been misused by critics of Kostov's government since in unfounded accusations of corruption. While successful in stabilizing the country, Bulgaria's current account balance started growing negative.

Some of Kostov's privatization policies were criticized by his opponents from the Bulgarian Socialist Party. Ultimately the UDF lost in the June 2001 election to the newly formed National Movement Simeon II. Kostov resigned as chair of the UDF and eventually left the party to establish, in 2004, a new political party, Democrats for a Strong Bulgaria (DSB). He chaired DSB until June 2013.

== Support for Fiscal Rules ==
In 2010, the GERB government of Prime Minister Boyko Borisov proposed instituting a tight fiscal rule in the Bulgarian Constitution, namely that the budget deficit could not exceed 2% of GDP in any one year. The proposal was supported by Ivan Kostov and his party Democrats for a Strong Bulgaria and Parliament adopted it in November 2010. Kostov's DSB supported several other initiatives by GERB's government, including the ban on smoking in public places, and the pension reform proposed by Finance Minister Simeon Dyankov.

== Personal ==
He is married to Elena Kostova. Kostov's hobby is tennis and he is also an avid follower of chess.
