= Ivan Marazov =

Bulgarian artist, culturologist, thracologist and politician (born 1942)

- Born: 15 March 1942 (age 84); Pirne, Bulgaria
- Occupations: Artist, politician
- Political party: Bulgarian Socialist Party

Ivan Rousev Marazov (Bulgarian: Иван Русев Маразов) born 15 March 1942 in Pirne, near Aytos, is a Bulgarian artist, culturologist, thracologist and politician.

In 1996, Marazov was a candidate to become President of Bulgaria for the Bulgarian Socialist Party (with Irina Bokova as the vice-presidential candidate) and finished in second place.
