= 2001 Bulgarian parliamentary election =

- 17 June 2001
- All 240 seats in the 39th National Assembly; 121 seats needed for a majority
- Turnout: 66.63%
Party	Leader	Vote %	Seats	+/–
NDSV	Simeon Sakskoburggotski	42.74	120	New
ODS	Ivan Kostov	18.18	51	−86
KzB	Georgi Parvanov	17.15	48	−10
DPS	Ahmed Dogan	7.45	21	+2
This lists parties that won seats. See the complete results below.
Results by constituency
Prime Minister before	Prime Minister after
Ivan Kostov; ODS	Simeon Sakskoburggotski; NDSV

Parliamentary elections were held in Bulgaria on 17 June 2001. The result was a victory for the new National Movement – Simeon II, which won 120 of the 240 seats. Following the elections, Simeon Saxe-Coburg-Gotha, the country's last Tsar, who was deposed by the Bulgarian Communist Party in 1946, became prime minister in a coalition with the Movement for Rights and Freedoms.

== Background ==
The elections came four years after the last parliamentary elections in 1997, marking the first occasion since the fall of communism that a full term had been completed. A total of 65 parties registered for the elections, together with eleven independents.

National Movement – Simeon II was originally prevented from registering by Sofia City Court as it failed to meet the Central Election Committee's requirements. However, after forming an alliance with the Bulgarian Women's Party and the Movement for National Revival, the party was allowed to register.

== Results ==
Graph of the party split among 240 seats.
Party	Votes	%	Seats	+/–
National Movement Simeon II	1,952,513	42.74	120	New
United Democratic Forces	830,338	18.18	51	−86
Coalition for Bulgaria	783,372	17.15	48	−10
Movement for Rights and Freedoms	340,395	7.45	21	+2
IMRO–George's Day Movement	165,927	3.63	0	New
Simeon II Coalition	157,141	3.44	0	New
National Union for Tsar Simeon II	77,671	1.70	0	New
Bulgarian Social Democracy	44,637	0.98	0	0
Union Bulgaria	33,637	0.74	0	New
Coalition "National Union Tzar Kiro"	27,636	0.60	0	New
NU Fatherland and Left	21,851	0.48	0	New
George Ganchev's Bloc	17,272	0.38	0	New
UAF–BZNS–BZNS(NP)	15,504	0.34	0	0
Bulgarian Workers' Party	12,579	0.28	0	New
Democratic Party of Justice	10,822	0.24	0	0
Bulgarian Socialist Workers' Party	10,797	0.24	0	0
Bulgarian Communist Party "Fatherland"	9,373	0.21	0	New
Patriotism 2000	6,077	0.13	0	New
Union of Patriotic Forces and Militaries of the Reserve Defense	5,227	0.11	0	New
Bulgarian Democratic Party for United States of Europe and the World	4,804	0.11	0	0
MDRUSWC–FPFB	4,740	0.10	0	New
Bulgarian National Party "Social Union"	4,439	0.10	0	New
Alternative Social-Liberal Party	4,267	0.09	0	New
Free Cooperative Party	3,935	0.09	0	0
Bulgarian National-Radical Party	3,018	0.07	0	0
Social Liberal Movement "Justice"	2,715	0.06	0	New
National Movement for New Era	2,462	0.05	0	New
Patriotic Party of Labour	1,601	0.04	0	New
Alliance for Preservation of the Wealth of Bulgaria	1,414	0.03	0	New
Party of the Workers' and Social Democratic Intelligentsia	1,033	0.02	0	New
Bulgarian Fatherland Party "National Union"	623	0.01	0	New
National Party of Labour, Private Owners, Producers and Creators	524	0.01	0	New
Bulgarian National Front	202	0.00	0	New
Bulgarian Business Bloc	162	0.00	0	−12
Party of the Middle Class	79	0.00	0	New
Union of the Nation – Movement of the Deprived	39	0.00	0	New
Independents	9,365	0.21	0	0
Total	4,568,191	100.00	240	0
Valid votes	4,568,191	99.13		
Invalid/blank votes	39,944	0.87		
Total votes	4,608,135	100.00		
Registered voters/turnout	6,916,151	66.63		
Source: Nohlen & Stöver, University of Essex

== Aftermath ==
Following the elections, Simeon Sakskoburggotski became prime minister and formed the Sakskoburggotski Government.

A study in the context of the election investigated which societal groups contribute to electoral volatility on the individual level. The findings described that voters belonging to the Turkish minority contribute to party system stability because they were less likely to switch their vote than their Bulgarian or Roma peers. The authors argue that "ethnic socialization provides information shortcuts for vote choice in low-information environments of new democracies." The case is considered evidence that ethnic minorities with relevant ethnic-linguistic parties in new democracies contribute to party system stability.
