= 1991 Bulgarian parliamentary election =

← 1990	13 October 1991	1994 →
- All 240 seats in the National Assembly; 121 seats needed for a majority
- Turnout: 83.87%
Party	Leader	Vote %	Seats
SDS	Philip Dimitrov	34.36	110
BSP	Alexander Lilov	33.14	106
DPS	Ahmed Dogan	7.55	24
This lists parties that won seats. See the complete results below.
Prime Minister before	Prime Minister after
Dimitar Popov; Independent	Philip Dimitrov; SDS

Parliamentary elections were held in Bulgaria on 13 October 1991. They were the first elections held under the country's first post-communist constitution, which had been promulgated three months earlier. Voter turnout was 84%.

The Union of Democratic Forces (SDS) emerged as the largest party, winning 110 of the 240 seats. The Bulgarian Socialist Party, the successor to the Communist Party, finished a close second with 106 seats. The Movement for Rights and Freedoms, which represented the ethnic-Turkish minority, won 24 seats. None of the other 58 parties that contested the elections crossed the 4% electoral threshold necessary to win seats in parliament.

Following the elections SDS leader Philip Dimitrov became Prime Minister, heading a coalition of the SDS and the Movement for Rights and Freedoms. It was the first noncommunist government in Bulgaria in 46 years.

== Results ==
Party	Votes	%	Seats
Union of Democratic Forces	1,903,567	34.36	110
Pre-electoral Union of BSP, BLP, OPT	1,836,050	33.14	106
Movement for Rights and Freedoms	418,168	7.55	24
Bulgarian Agrarian National Union–United	214,052	3.86	0
Bulgarian Agrarian People's Union "Nikola Petkov"	190,454	3.44	0
Union of Democratic Forces–Centre	177,295	3.20	0
Union of Democratic Forces–Liberal (DP–ZP)	155,902	2.81	0
Kingdom of Bulgaria Federation	100,883	1.82	0
Bulgarian Business Bloc	73,379	1.32	0
Bulgarian National Radical Party	62,462	1.13	0
Bulgarian Business Party	51,497	0.93	0
Freedom Coalition for the Turnovo Constitution	39,719	0.72	0
Bulgarian Communist Party	39,386	0.71	0
Political Transformation Forum	30,442	0.55	0
Movement of Non-partisans for Democracy	22,588	0.41	0
Liberal Party – Pernik	18,577	0.34	0
Coalition BNS, BOP and BNSND	17,262	0.31	0
Bulgarian National Democratic Party	15,399	0.28	0
Liberal Congress Party	14,454	0.26	0
National Patrotic Union Party	14,288	0.26	0
Bulgarian Democratic Party	13,767	0.25	0
Independent Democratic Party	12,770	0.23	0
Free Cooperative Party	12,150	0.22	0
Union of Non-partisan Guarantors	9,945	0.18	0
Bulgarian Revolutionary Party of Youth – Varna	8,133	0.15	0
Bulgarian Communist Party – Marxists	7,663	0.14	0
Radical Christian Party	6,399	0.12	0
Bulgarian Workers' Social Democratic Party	5,916	0.11	0
Bulgarian Eagle Party	4,853	0.09	0
Bulgarian Worker-Rural Party – Varna	3,793	0.07	0
Organisation of Invalids and Underprivileged Citizens of Bulgaria	3,362	0.06	0
Free Democratic Party	1,758	0.03	0
Bulgarian Democratic Party for European and World States	984	0.02	0
Party for Free Democracy – Centre	866	0.02	0
United Democratic Union 'Party for Justice'	30	0.00	0
Party of Proprietors of Bulgaria	8	0.00	0
Christian Radical Democratic Party	5	0.00	0
Independents	52,617	0.95	0
Total	5,540,843	100.00	240
Valid votes	5,540,843	97.30	
Invalid/blank votes	153,921	2.70	
Total votes	5,694,764	100.00	
Registered voters/turnout	6,790,006	83.87	
Source: Nohlen & Stöver, University of Essex
