= Velko Valkanov =

Bulgarian lawyer and politician

Velko Valkanov Велко Вълканов

Personal details
- Born: Velko Valkanov Ivanov; 13 November 1927 Elhovo, Bulgaria
- Died: 26 November 2016 (aged 89) Sofia, Bulgaria
- Party: Independent
- Profession: Jurist

Velko Vulkanov Ivanov (Bulgarian: Велко Вълканов Иванов; November 13, 1927 - November 26, 2016) was a Bulgarian lawyer and politician. He graduated from "Law" at Sofia University. He became a candidate of legal sciences (Leipzig, East Germany) and Doctor of Juridical Science. Senior Research Associate. He worked at the Institute of State and Law of the Bulgarian Academy of Sciences.

He was elected MP in the 7th Grand National Assembly (1990–1991), 36th (1991–1994), 37th (1994–1997) and 38th (1997–2001) National Assembly.

The 1992 Bulgarian presidential election was a presidential candidate with runner Rumen Vodenitcharov. Their application is built by an initiative committee. With the support of the Bulgarian Socialist Party, the couple occupies second place in the standings, won the first round 30.44% and in the second round - 47.15 percent of the vote.

Honorary Chairman of the Bulgarian Anti-Fascist Union (successor of the Union of fighters against Fascism). Chairman of the Foundation "Georgi Dimitrov". He died on 26 November 2016 at the age of 89.
