= 1992 Bulgarian presidential election =

Presidential election in Bulgaria

← 1990	12 January 1992 (first round); 19 January 1992 (second round)	1996 →
- Turnout: 75.39% (first round), 75.90% (second round)
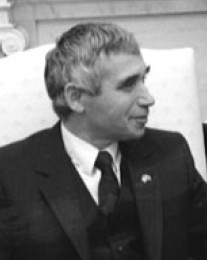
Nominee	Zhelyu Zhelev	Velko Valkanov
Party	SDS	Independent
Running mate	Blaga Dimitrova	Rumen Vodenicharov
Popular vote	2,738,420	2,443,434
Percentage	52.85%	47.15%
President before election
Zhelyu Zhelev
SDS
Elected President
Zhelyu Zhelev
SDS

Direct presidential elections were held for the first time in Bulgaria on 12 January 1992, with a second round on 19 January. The result was a victory for incumbent President Zhelyu Zhelev of the Union of Democratic Forces, who won 52.8% of the vote in the second round. Voter turnout was 75.4% in the first round and 75.9% in the second. Zhelev had originally been elected as president by the Grand National Assembly in 1990.

== Results ==
Candidate	Running mate	Party	First round		Second round	
Candidate	Running mate	Party	Votes	%	Votes	%
Zhelyu Zhelev	Blaga Dimitrova	Union of Democratic Forces	2,273,541	44.66	2,738,420	52.85
Velko Valkanov	Rumen Vodenicharov	Independent (Bulgarian Socialist Party)	1,549,970	30.44	2,443,434	47.15
George Ganchev	Petar Beron	Bulgarian Business Bloc	854,108	16.78		
Blagovest Sendov	Ognyan Saparev	Independent	113,897	2.24		
Slavomir Tsankov	Mikhail Milanov	Union of Democratic Parties and Movements "Era 3"	50,247	0.99		
Dimitar Popov	Hristo Genchev	Bulgarian National Democratic Party	32,606	0.64		
Anton Donchev	Nikolai Shkutov	Movement "Voice for Non-Party President"	31,798	0.62		
Asen Mladenov	Ivan Georgiev	Bulgarian Communist Party	29,646	0.58		
Peter Gogov	Bogdan Yotsov	Independent Democratic Party	21,302	0.42		
Ivan Georgiev	Ivan Kisimov	Bulgarian National Radical Party	19,495	0.38		
Siyka Georgieva	Stancho Mitev	Transfiguration Political Forum	17,150	0.34		
Peter Manolov	Emilia Savova	Non-Partisan Democracy Movement	14,023	0.28		
Kirill Borisov	Milan Tonev	Liberal Party - Pernik	11,227	0.22		
Yolo Denev	Georgi Statkov	Bulgarian Democratic Party	10,769	0.21		
Ivan Ivanov	Petar Dimitrov	Bulgarian National Union – New Democracy	10,099	0.20		
Krum Krumov-Kumanov	Vencheslav Georgiev	Pre-Election Union for National Salvation	10,266	0.20		
Stoyan Tsankov	Ivan Stoyanov	Democratic Party in Bulgaria	9,888	0.19		
Dimitar Dimitrov	Velcho Velev	Free Democratic Party	8,620	0.17		
Dimitar Markovski	Dimitar Savov	Free Cooperative Party	8,360	0.16		
Pravdolyub Kozhukharov	Simeon Yanulev	Bulgarian Workers and Peasants Party	7,808	0.15		
Todor Pashaliyski	Velin Iliev	Christian Radical Party	6,307	0.12		
Total			5,091,127	100.00	5,181,854	100.00
Valid votes			5,091,127	99.05	5,181,854	99.53
Invalid/blank votes			48,713	0.95	24,388	0.47
Total votes			5,139,840	100.00	5,206,242	100.00
Registered voters/turnout			6,817,914	75.39	6,859,318	75.90
Source: President of Bulgaria
