= Zhelyu Zhelev =

President of Bulgaria from 1990 to 1997

- Желю Желев
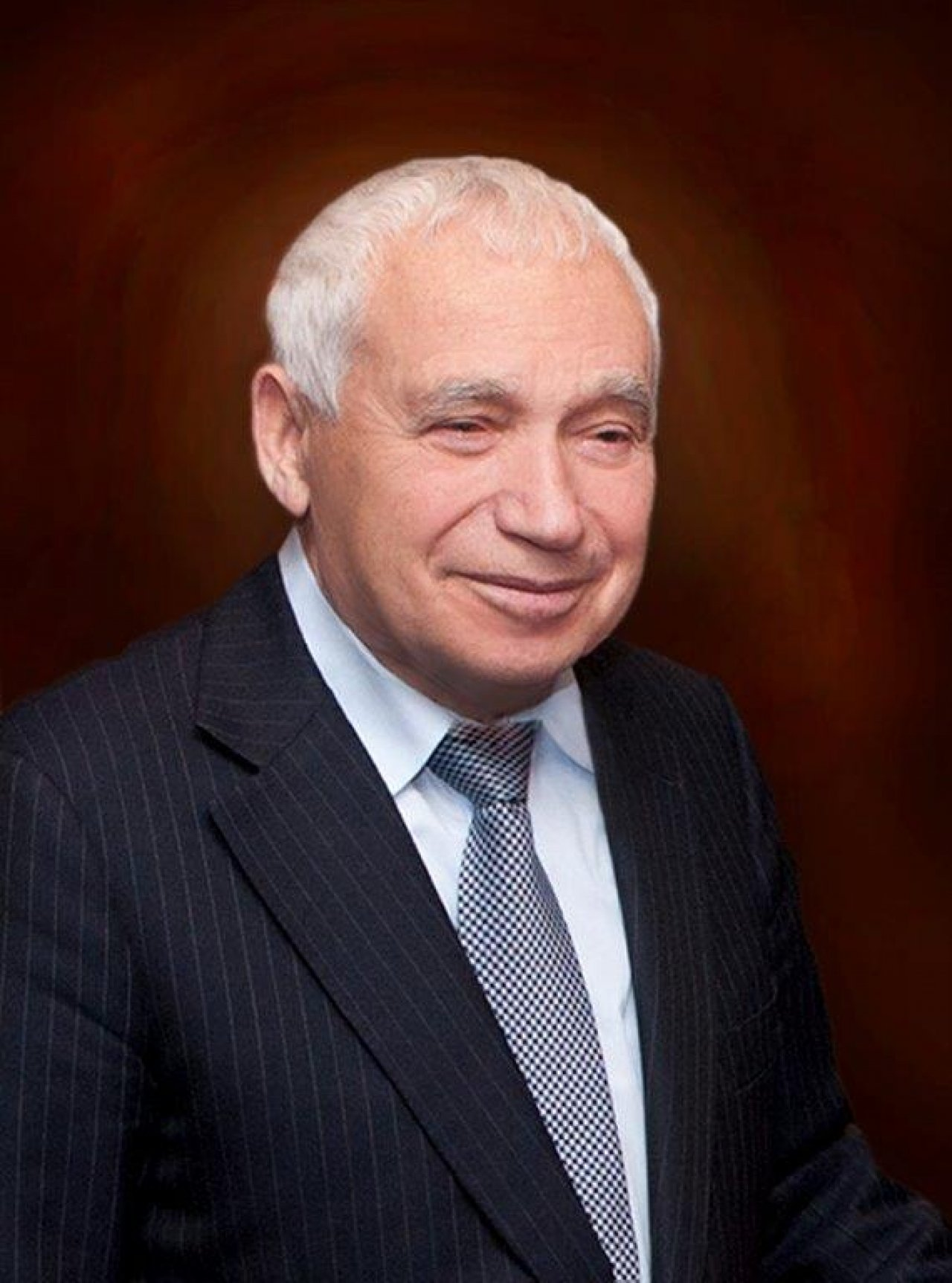

President of Bulgaria
- In office 22 January 1992 – 22 January 1997
- Prime Minister: Philip Dimitrov; Lyuben Berov; Reneta Indzhova; Zhan Videnov
- Vice President: Blaga Dimitrova
- Preceded by: Himself (as Chairman)
- Succeeded by: Petar Stoyanov

Chairman (President) of Bulgaria
- In office 1 August 1990 – 22 January 1992
- Prime Minister: Andrey Lukanov; Dimitar Popov; Philip Dimitrov
- Deputy: Atanas Semerdzhiev
- Preceded by: Petar Mladenov
- Succeeded by: Himself (as President)

Leader of the Union of Democratic Forces
- In office 7 December 1989 – 1 August 1990
- Preceded by: Position established
- Succeeded by: Petar Beron

Personal details
- Born: Zhelyu Mitev Zhelev; 3 March 1935 Veselinovo, Tsardom of Bulgaria
- Died: 30 January 2015 (aged 79) Sofia, Bulgaria
- Resting place: Central Sofia Cemetery
- Party: Independent (1990–2015)
- Other political affiliations: Union of Democratic Forces (1989–1990); Communist Party (1960–1965)
- Spouse: Maria Zheleva (m. 1961; died 2013)
- Children: Mitko (died 80 days after birth); Yordanka (died in 1993); Stanka
- Occupation: Politician; philosopher
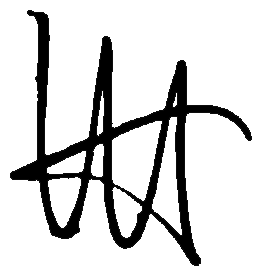
- Signature

Zhelyu Mitev Zhelev (Bulgarian: Желю Митев Желев; 3 March 1935 – 30 January 2015) was a Bulgarian politician and former dissident who served as the first democratically elected and non-Communist president of Bulgaria, from 1990 to 1997. Zhelev was one of the most prominent figures of the 1989 Bulgarian Revolution, which ended the 35 year rule of President Todor Zhivkov. A member of the Union of Democratic Forces, he was elected as president by the 7th Grand National Assembly. Two years later, he won Bulgaria's first direct presidential elections. He lost his party's nomination for his 1996 reelection campaign after losing a tough primary race to Petar Stoyanov.

== Biography ==
=== Early life ===
Zhelev was born in 1935 into a modest village family in Veselinovo in north-eastern Bulgaria. He studied philosophy at Sofia University, graduating in 1958 and gaining a PhD in 1974, a remarkable achievement given that he was under a cloud as a dissident, having been expelled from the Communist Party in 1965. After his expulsion he endured years of “social parasitism”, or unemployment in communist terminology, which he spent in virtual internal exile in his wife’s village, scraping a living from odd jobs on farms.

=== Dissident ===
Zhelev was a member of the Bulgarian Communist Party, but was expelled from it for political reasons in 1965. He was unemployed for six years since all employment in Bulgaria was state-regulated.

In 1982, he published his controversial work, Fascism (Фашизмът). Three weeks after the volume's publication in 1982, the book was removed from bookstores and libraries throughout the nation, as its description of the fascist states of Italy, Germany and Spain before, during, and after World War II made these regimes comparable to the Communist regimes in the Eastern Bloc.

=== SDS ===
In 1988, just before the Fall of Communism, Zhelev founded the Ruse Committee, and in 1989 he became a founding member and chairman of the Club for Support of Openness and the Reform (a time when many such democratic clubs were formed), which helped him to achieve the position of Chairman of the Coordinating Council of the Union of Democratic Forces (Bulgarian: СДС, SDS) party.

=== MP and President ===
Zhelev was elected MP in June 1990 for the 7th Grand National Assembly; the Assembly's main goal was to create a new democratic Constitution of Bulgaria. After the resignation of President Petar Mladenov, the assembly elected Zhelev his successor on 1 August 1990. He thus became the first head of state in 44 years who was not either a Communist or fellow traveler.

=== 1992 presidential election ===
Under the new constitution adopted in July 1991, the president was to be elected directly by voters, for a maximum of two terms. The first such election was held in January 1992. Zhelev ran for the post, even though its powers had been significantly reduced under the 1991 constitution. While the presidency had been an executive post under the amended Zhivkov Constitution, the 1991 document made the presidency a largely representative post with little de facto executive authority.

Zhelev led the field in the first round, held on 12 January. He then won in the runoff a week later against Velko Valkanov (who was endorsed by the Socialists) with 52.8% of the votes to become Bulgaria's first directly elected head of state. He immediately suspended his membership in the UDF. While the new constitution only barred him from serving in a leadership post with the party, he believed the presidency should be above politics. Since then, convention in Bulgaria calls for the president to not be a formal member of a political party during his term.

=== 1996 presidential election ===
Zhelev sought a second term in 1996, but lost the UDF nomination to eventual winner Petar Stoyanov.

=== Later political career ===
After his defeat in the 1996 UDF primaries and after the end of his presidency in 1997, Zhelev remained in politics, but on a much smaller scale. He became Honorary Chair of the Liberal Democratic Union and Honorary Chair of the Liberal International and in 1997 went on to establish and preside over a foundation named after him. Zhelev was the initiator and president of the Balkan Political Club, a union of former political leaders from Southeast Europe. As part of the club he voiced his support for Turkey's accession to the European Union.

In 2009, Zhelev also voiced his opinion that Bulgaria should adopt a presidential system based upon the French model: "The country should have both prime minister and president, but the latter should be vested in far-reaching powers so that he may control the executive power".

Zhelev died in Sofia at the age of 79 on 30 January 2015.

=== World Justice Project ===
Zhelyu Zhelev served as an Honorary Co-Chair for the World Justice Project (ABA).

== Family ==
He was married to Maria Zheleva (3 April 1942 – 8 December 2013) and has two daughters Yordanka (1963–1993) and Stanka (born 1966). Zhelev has two grandchildren from his daughter Stanka.

== Awards and accolades ==
On 15 January 2010, Zhelev received the Order 8-September for his contribution to the recognition of the independence of the Republic of Macedonia from the former Yugoslavia.

Zhelev Peak on Loubet Coast, Antarctica is named after Zhelyu Zhelev "for his support for the Bulgarian Antarctic programme."

=== National honours ===
- Bulgaria: Grand Cross of the Order of the Stara Planina (3 March 2005)

=== Foreign honours ===
- Spain: Grand Cross of the Order of Civil Merit (1993)
- Portugal: Grand Collar of the Order of Liberty (1994)
- Poland: Order of Merit of the Republic of Poland (1994)
- South Korea: Grand Order of Mugunghwa (1995)
- Republic of Macedonia: Order 8-September (2010)
