= Union of Democratic Forces (Bulgaria) =

Bulgarian political party

Union of Democratic Forces Съюз на демократичните сили
- Abbreviation: СДС; SDS
- Leader: Iliya Lazarov
- Founders: Zhelyu Zhelev; Petar Beron; Rumen Vodenicharov; Georgi Spasov
- Founded: 7 December 1989
- Headquarters: 134 Rakovska Str., 1000 Sofia
- Membership (2018): around 10,000
- Ideology: Christian democracy; Conservatism; National conservatism; Anti-communism; Pro-Europeanism
- Political position: Centre-right to right-wing
- National affiliation: GERB—SDS
- European affiliation: European People's Party
- European Parliament group: European People's Party Group
- International affiliation: Centrist Democrat International; International Democrat Union (formerly)
- Colours: Blue
- National Assembly: 0 / 240
- European Parliament: 1 / 17
- Municipalities: 7 / 265

Website
- sds.bg

The Union of Democratic Forces (Bulgarian: Съюз на демократичните сили, romanized: Sayuz na demokratichnite sili, СДС or SDS) is a political party in Bulgaria, founded in 1989 as a union of several political organizations in opposition to the communist government. The Union was transformed into a single unified party with the same name. The SDS is a member of the European People's Party (EPP). In the 1990s the party had the largest membership in the country, with one million members, but has since splintered into a number of small parties totaling no more than 40,000 members. The SDS proper had 12,000 members in 2016.

The party was a ruling party in Bulgaria during the period between 1991–1993 and 1997–2001.

== History ==
Dissident groups formed under the faltering regime of Todor Zhivkov in the late 1980s were the basis for the Union. Once Zhivkov fell, a loose political confederation was envisioned where constituent groups could continue to work for their own cause, while the coordinating council would include three members from each organization. The Longtime dissident philosopher Zhelyu Zhelev, who would later become Bulgaria's president, was elected chairman, and Petar Beron, a well-known environmental scientist, was chosen as secretary.

The SDS was officially founded on 7 December 1989 as a union of eleven political organizations, such as Ekoglasnost, Bulgarian Social Democratic Workers' Party (United) and Bulgarian Agrarian People's Union "Nikola Petkov". The following year, six more parties were incorporated (Radical Democratic Party, Green Party of Bulgaria, Democratic Party, New Social Democratic Party, United Democratic Centre, Democratic Front).

The SDS lost the 1990 elections to the Bulgarian Socialist Party but still participated in the joint cabinet of Dimitar Iliev Popov. On 15 May 1991 39 members left the SDS because of disagreements with the draft of the new constitution and founded the new organizations SDS-Center and SDS-Liberals. Later the remnants of the SDS formed their own cabinet with Prime Minister Filip Dimitrov in November 1991, though the cabinet lasted only a little over a year when the government failed a motion of confidence in September 1992. The socialists, together with the Movement for Rights and Freedoms, formed a coalition government headed by Prof. Lyuben Berov. Following the resignation of Berov's cabinet in October 1994, the BSP went on to win the 1994 elections.

However, following discontent over economic problems, Prime Minister Zhan Videnov resigned at the end of 1996, clearing the way for new elections, this time won by the SDS with a crushing 55% vote. Party leader Ivan Kostov went on to form the new government and successfully passed several economic reforms. He was eventually rewarded in December 1999 with an invitation to begin membership talks with the European Union. But public discontent over the social cost of the reforms, including increased unemployment, as well as allegations of corruption led to the SDS's defeat in the June 2001 elections, which were won by the National Movement for Simeon II. The United Democratic Forces won 18.2% of the popular vote and 51 out of 240 seats.

The SDS was chaired until the May 20, 2007 European elections by Petar Stoyanov, former president of the country. Meanwhile, Kostov, the former Prime Minister and SDS party leader went on to form his own party - Democrats for a Strong Bulgaria. At the 2005 parliamentary election, the United Democratic Forces won 8.4% of the popular vote and 20 out of 240 seats.

It was announced at the inaugural conference of the Movement for European Reform (MER, March 2007) that the SDS would become official partners alongside the British Conservative Party and the Czech Civic Democratic Party. In mid April 2007, the SDS backtracked on its decision, stating that it remains loyal to the EPP and that it will never leave the EPP section of the EPP-ED Group to join another Group.

In the May 20, 2007 European elections the SDS failed to elect even a single MEP, resulting in the resignation of Stoyanov who led the list.

At the start of 2009 the SDS entered in an electoral alliance named the "Blue Coalition" with four other center-right parties: the DSB, the United Agrarians, the Bulgarian Social Democratic Party and the Radical Democratic Party. The alliance fielded candidates for the June 2009 European election winning a seat. When the Lisbon Treaty came into force in December of that year, their representation doubled. Now both the SDS and the DSB had an MEP.

The Blue coalition placed fifth in the legislative election a month later with a combined 6.8% of the vote and 15 seats.

In the May 2013 elections, the SDS ran alone and lost all of its seats in the Bulgarian National Assembly, but regained four next year as a part of the Reformist Bloc alliance. The same pattern repeated in 2017 and April of 2021, with zero and then two seats respectively (running together with GERB in 2021). Two other MPs joined the SDS later on.

== Coalitions ==
=== United Democratic Forces ===
For the 1997 parliamentary elections, an alliance named United Democratic Forces was formed around SDS. The same name was later used for other elections and parliamentary groups.

=== The Blue Coalition ===
In early 2009 an alliance was formed together with Democrats for a Strong Bulgaria for the European Parliament elections and National Assembly elections. The coalition was named the Blue Coalition and included some other parties.

=== The Reformist Bloc ===
The coalition agreement to form the alliance of the Reformist Bloc was signed on 20 December 2013. The five parties that signed the agreement were the Union of Democratic Forces, Democrats for a Strong Bulgaria, Bulgaria for Citizens Movement, People's Party Freedom and Dignity, and the Bulgarian Agrarian National Union.

=== GERB ===
Since 2019 the party is in a coalition with GERB.

== List of chairmen ==
Chairmen of the Coordination Council

- Zhelyu Zhelev (1989–1990)
- Petar Beron (1990)
- Filip Dimitrov (1990–1994)
- Ivan Kostov (1994–1997)

Chairmen and Chairwomen of the unified party

- Ivan Kostov (1997–2001)
- Ekaterina Mihailova (2001–2002)
- Nadezhda Mihailova (2002–2005)
- Petar Stoyanov (2005–2007)
- Plamen Yurukov (2007–2008)
- Martin Dimitrov (2008–2012)
- Emil Kabaivanov (2012–2013)
- Bozhidar Lukarski (2013–2018)
- Rumen Hristov (2018–present)

== Election results ==
=== National Assembly ===
Election	Votes	%	Seats	+/–	Government
1990	2,217,798	36.21 (#2)	144 / 400	Steady	Caretaker
1991	1,903,567	34.4 (#1)	110 / 240	▼34	Coalition (1991–1992)
1991	1,903,567	34.4 (#1)	110 / 240	▼34	Opposition (1992–1994)
1994	1,260,374	24.23 (#2)	69 / 240	▼41	Opposition
1997 (Note: Results of the alliance United Democratic Forces.)	2,223,714	52.3 (#1)	137 / 240	▲68	Majority
2001	830,338	18.18 (#2)	51 / 240	▼86	Opposition
2005	280,323	7.68 (#5)	20 / 240	▼31	Opposition
2009 (Note: Results of the alliance Blue Coalition.)	285,671	6.76 (#5)	15 / 240	▼5	Support
2013	48,681	1.38 (#12)	0 / 240	▼15	Extra-parliamentary
2014 (Note: Results of the alliance Reformist Bloc.)	291,806	8.89 (#4)	4 / 240	▲4	Coalition
2017	107,399	3.06 (#6)	0 / 240	▼4	Extra-parliamentary
Apr 2021 (Note: Results with GERB.)	837,671	25.71 (#1)	2 / 240	▲2	Snap election
Jul 2021	642,165	23.21 (#2)	3 / 240	▲1	Snap election
Nov 2021	596,456	22.44 (#2)	2 / 240	▼1	Opposition
2022	634,627	25.34 (#1)	3 / 240	▲1	Snap election
2023	669,924	25.39 (#1)	2 / 240	▼1	Coalition
Jun 2024	530,658	23.99 (#1)	3 / 240	▲1	Snap election
Oct 2024	642,973	25.52 (#1)	1 / 240	▼2	Coalition
2026	433,755	13.18 (#2)	1 / 240	0	Opposition

=== Presidential ===
Election	Candidate	First round			Second round		
Election	Candidate	Votes	%	Rank	Votes	%	Result
1992	Zhelyu Zhelev	2,273,541	44.66	1st	2,738,420	52.85	Won
1996	Petar Stoyanov	1,889,825	44.07	1st	2,502,517	59.73	Won
2001	Petar Stoyanov	991,680	34.95	2nd	1,731,676	45.87	Lost
2006	Nedelcho Beronov	271,078	9.75%	3rd	-	-	Lost
2011	Rumen Hristov	65,761	1.95%	6th	-	-	Lost
2016	Traycho Traykov	224,734	5.87%	6th	-	-	Lost
2021	Anastas Gerdzhikov	610,862	22.8	2nd	733,791	31.8	Lost

=== European Parliament ===
Election	List leader	Votes	%	Seats	+/–	EP Group
2007	Stefan Sofiyanski	84,350	4.35 (#7)	0 / 18	New	–
2009	Nadezhda Mihaylova	204,817	7.95 (#6)	1 / 18	▲1	EPP
2014	Meglena Kuneva	144,532	6.45 (#5)	0 / 17	▼1	–
2019	Mariya Gabriel	607,194	30.13 (#1)	1 / 17	▲1	EPP
2024	Rosen Zhelyazkov	474,059	23.55 (#1)	1 / 17	0	EPP
