= 2001 Bulgarian presidential election =

- 11 November 2001 (first round); 18 November 2001 (second round)
- Turnout: 41.63% (first round) ▼21.51pp 54.92% (second round) ▼6.53pp
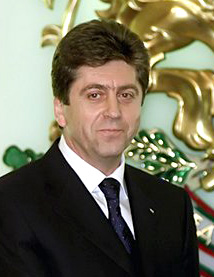

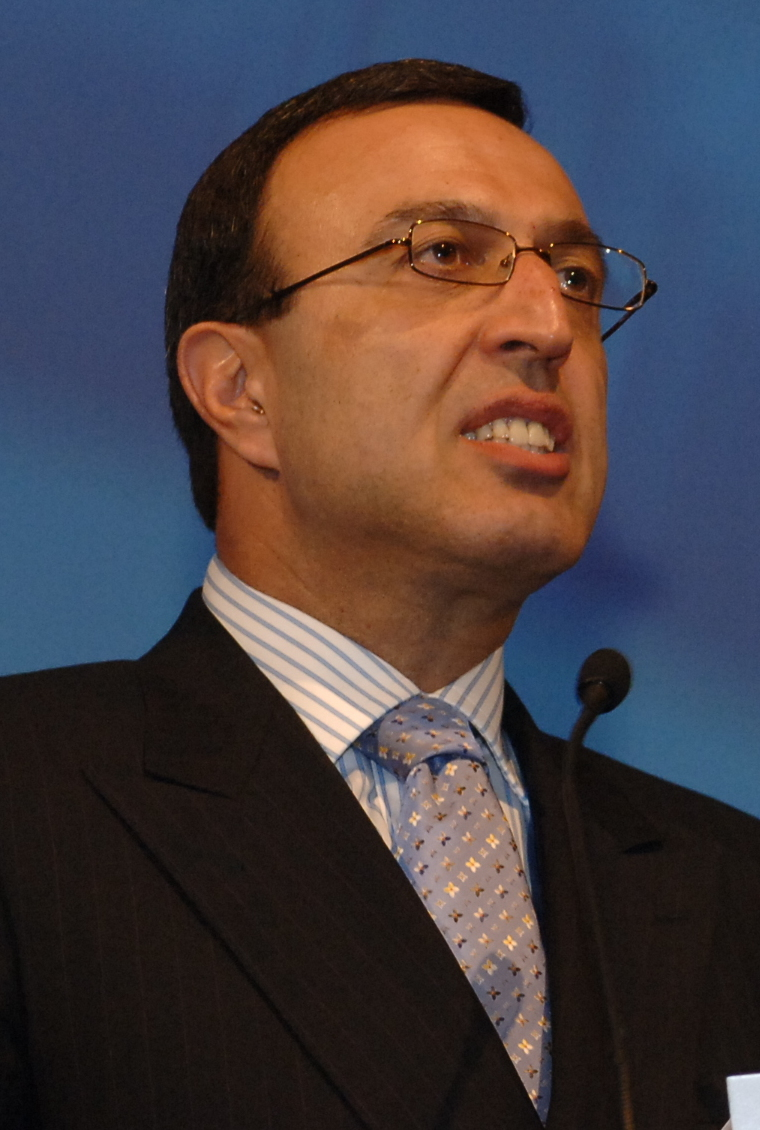
Nominee	Georgi Parvanov	Petar Stoyanov
Party	BSP	ODS
Running mate	Angel Marin	Neli Kutskova
Popular vote	2,043,443	1,731,676
Percentage	54.13%	45.87%
- Results by province Parvanov: 50–60% 60–70% Stoyanov: 50–60% 60–70%
President before election
Petar Stoyanov
ODS
Elected President
Georgi Parvanov
BSP

Presidential elections were held in Bulgaria on 11 November 2001, with a second round on 18 November. The result was a victory for Georgi Parvanov of the Bulgarian Socialist Party, who won 54.0% of the vote in the second round, defeating incumbent president Petar Stoyanov. Voter turnout was 41.8% in the first round and 55.1% in the second. Parvanov took office in 2002, becoming the first former communist to hold the post since 1990.

== Opinion polls ==
=== First round ===
Pollster	Date	Stoyanov	Bonev	Parvanov	Ganchev	Indzhova	Beron	Others
Alpha Research	20.09.2001	34	19	18	3	3	0.5	22.5
Alpha Research	21.10.2001	43.9	24.5	23.2	3.9	3.9	0.6	0

== Results ==
Candidate	Running mate	Party	First round		Second round	
Candidate	Running mate	Party	Votes	%	Votes	%
Georgi Parvanov	Angel Marin	Bulgarian Socialist Party	1,032,665	36.39	2,043,443	54.13
Petar Stoyanov	Neli Kutskova	United Democratic Forces	991,680	34.95	1,731,676	45.87
Bogomil Bonev	Atanas Zhelezchev	Independent	546,801	19.27		
Reneta Indzhova	Krastyu Ilov	Independent (Movement for Rights and Freedoms)	139,680	4.92		
George Ganchev	Veselin Bonchev	George Ganchev's Bloc	95,481	3.36		
Petar Beron	Stoyan Andreev	Independent	31,394	1.11		
Total			2,837,701	100.00	3,775,119	100.00
Valid votes			2,837,701	99.56	3,775,119	99.76
Invalid/blank votes			12,590	0.44	8,914	0.24
Total votes			2,850,291	100.00	3,784,033	100.00
Registered voters/turnout			6,847,422	41.63	6,889,638	54.92
Source: President of Bulgaria Nohlen & Stöver
