= Philip Dimitrov =

Prime Minister of Bulgaria from 1991 to 1992

- Филип Димитров

Prime Minister of Bulgaria
- In office 8 November 1991 – 29 December 1992
- President: Zhelyu Zhelev
- Deputy: Nikola Vasilev; Ilko Eskenazi
- Preceded by: Dimitar Popov
- Succeeded by: Lyuben Berov

Judge of the Constitutional Court
- Incumbent
- Assumed office 11 November 2015
- Appointed by: Rosen Plevneliev
- Preceded by: Plamen Kirov

Member of the European Parliament for Bulgaria
- In office 1 January 2007 – 20 May 2007
- Preceded by: Constituency established
- Succeeded by: Rumiana Jeleva

Bulgarian Ambassador to the United States
- In office 10 September 1998 – 14 February 2002
- Preceded by: Snezhana Botusharova
- Succeeded by: Elena Poptodorova

Member of the National Assembly
- In office 11 July 2005 – 10 July 2008
- Constituency: 24th MMC - Sofia
- In office 4 November 1991 – 13 February 1997
- Constituency: 24th MMC - Sofia

Leader of the Union of Democratic Forces
- In office 1 December 1990 – 29 December 1994
- Preceded by: Petar Beron
- Succeeded by: Ivan Kostov

Member of the 7th Grand National Assembly
- In office 10 July 1990 – 2 October 1991
- Preceded by: Position established
- Succeeded by: Position abolished

Personal details
- Born: Philip Dimitrov Dimitrov; 31 March 1955 (age 71) Sofia, PR Bulgaria
- Party: SDS (1990-2008)
- Other political affiliations: Green Party (later part of SDS)
- Spouse: Elena Dimitrova
- Education: Sofia University
- Occupation: Politician; diplomat; lawyer; author

Philip Dimitrov Dimitrov (Bulgarian: Филип Димитров Димитров [ˈfilip dimiˈtrɔf]; born 31 March 1955) is a Bulgarian politician, Prime Minister of Bulgaria 1991–2, MP in the 36th (1991–1994), 37th (1994–1997) and the 40th (2005–2007) National Assembly, and MEP from January 2007 to May 2007.

== Biography ==
Dimitrov was born in Sofia. He graduated from the First English Language School, Sofia, in 1973 and later he graduated with a law degree from Sofia University in 1977, and then undertook further study in the field of individual and group psychotherapy and worked with outpatients using the psycho-dynamic approach. He worked as an attorney in Sofia between 1979 and 1990, serving as Secretary of the Bulgarian Attorneys' Union from 1989 onwards. Bulgarian media had alleged that his office served as a Communist-era secret police hideout. He reacted immediately by giving the first order, in spite of reluctance from his allies, to reveal information on any citizen's request about whether there was any data of his/her links with the secret police, thus making the first break through the inaccessibility of the secret police files. The first act of the next Government was abolishing this order. Similarly, in the context of the time, false rumors were spread about alleged homosexuality, alleged use of Communist privileges for entering high school and/or university and alleged family connections with the Communist party.

=== Career ===
Dimitrov was active in the Union of Democratic Forces, a broad coalition against the rule of the Bulgarian Communist Party. He was elected vice-president of the Green Party. He became a member of its 'National Coordination Council' in 1990, and was its President from December that year until December 1994. He has been a member of the Executive Council of the UDF since February 1997.

Dimitrov led the UDF to victory in the 1991 election, becoming the first elected Prime Minister in 47 years who was not either a Communist or a fellow traveller. His government was the first since that time with no Communist participation.He remained in office until losing a vote of confidence that he called in the late fall of 1992. During its term of office (until the end of 1992), his government managed to make the new democratic institutions work and started an ambitious set of democratic political and economic reforms. Under his administration, observance of human rights became an irrevocable legal and ethical norm and previous ethnic tensions and abuses were eliminated. Foreign policy focused on integration into Europe and the West. Bulgaria was the first country to recognize Macedonia (now North Macedonia) unconditionally as a sovereign state. His government abolished the restrictions to private initiative and started establishing a free market system, which literally changed most Bulgarian cities within half a year. He insisted on the large-scale restitution of nationalized properties, although he himself had none, and his government made the first practical steps allowing citizens to re-claim property that had been confiscated by the state.

According to his opponents, Dimitrov is responsible for the collapse of the Bulgarian agriculture after 1991 by restoring the land of the state-owned cooperative farms to its legitimate owners immediately instead of allowing a gradual transition from state-owned to private-owned agriculture. The problem was that all of these owners were old people, who received small pieces of land, and they had no machinery and physical strength to cultivate these lands. The infrastructure of the cooperative farms (water systems, machines, buildings etc.) was left without any supervision, and it was quickly destroyed and stolen. This had a devastating effect for the Bulgarian agriculture. The production of agricultural goods collapsed, many people in the agriculture sector became unemployed, and the population in the Bulgarian villages dropped."

His government made possible the swift restitution of citizenship and property rights for all Jewish Bulgarian emigrants (see also Jews in Bulgaria).

He served in the 36th, 37th, and 40th legislatures of the National Assembly, having been elected in Sofia for the UDF on each occasion. In 2005, he was elected Deputy Speaker of the 40th National Assembly. He authored or introduced among other bills the Bill for Abolition of Mandatory Military Service and (several times) bills on preventing and sanctioning Conflict of Interest. He was a member of the Bulgarian Parliament Delegation for Relations with the European Parliament. In January through June 2007 he was a member of the European Parliament and Deputy Chairman of the Committee on Constitutional Affairs.

In April 1997 he was appointed Ambassador of Bulgaria at the UN, New York and from August 1998 to January 2002 he was Ambassador of Bulgaria to the US.

His inability to compromise led to vetoing his candidacy both for President (fall of 2006) and Leader of the list of candidates for the European parliament (spring of 2007). In spite of his quiet withdrawal, the UDF lost both elections heavily. In the fall of 2007, he was rejected by the government as a candidate for the position of Judge at the European Court of Human Rights (Strasbourg). In July 2008, he declared that he was voluntarily leaving politics for good.

In 2004 he was a Special Envoy of the President of the CSCE (Commission on Security and Cooperation in Europe) for Armenia and Azerbaijan. He was a visiting scholar in the Woodrow Wilson Center in 2003. Philip Dimitrov has taught political sciences in the American University in Bulgaria between 2002 and 2008, led post graduate programme at the University of Toronto (2007) and was visiting professor at Christopher Newport University in Newport News, Virginia (2008 - 2009). He holds PhD in political science and is Distinguished professor (Reader) at the New Bulgarian University.

Since 2004 Dimitrov has been a Member of the Club of Madrid, an independent non-profit organization composed of 88 democratic former Presidents and Prime Ministers from 58 different countries. The Club de Madrid's objective is to promote "Democracy that Delivers".

In 2004 he was Senior member of the NED-CLS team for democratic experience exchange with Georgia. He was member of the Board of the New Bulgarian University, Honorary Chairman of the board of the George Marshal Association – Bulgaria and Program Director at the 'Bulgarian Institute for Legal Development'.

He was appointed Head of Delegation of the European Union to the Republic of Georgia and served there between 2010 and 2014.

Between 2015 and 2024 he was a member of the Constitutional Court of Bulgaria.

In September 1999, Mr. Dimitrov was granted the Truman-Reagan Freedom Award for his contribution to overcoming Communism.

== Family ==
He is married to Elena Gueorguieva, MD.

== Publications ==
- For They Lived, Oh Lord - a novel, 1991 (The Balkans in the first half of the 14th century) (in Bulgarian)
- The True Story of the Round Table Knights, 1997 (in Bulgarian)
- The Myths of Bulgarian Transition, 2002 (in Bulgarian)
- Light of Men, 2003(in Bulgarian) and 2019 (in English) (The history of the early church)
- Jumping into the Atlantic, Woodrow Wilson Center, 2003 (in English)
- The New Democracies and the Transatlantic Link, 2004 (in Bulgarian)
- Political Representation after Communism, 2010 (in Bulgarian)
- Revisiting the Beginning of the Bulgarian Transition, 2016 (in English)
- Brothers (2019) (History of the Balkans IX-XI century) (in Bulgarian)

Political offices
| Preceded by Dimitar Iliev Popov | Prime Minister of Bulgaria; 1991-1992 | Succeeded by Lyuben Berov |
