= 1997 Bulgarian parliamentary election =

- 19 April 1997
- All 240 seats in the National Assembly; 121 seats needed for a majority
- Turnout: 58.87%
| Party | Leader | Vote % | Seats | +/– |
|---|---|---|---|---|
| ODS | Ivan Kostov | 52.26 | 137 | +68 |
| KzB | Georgi Parvanov | 22.07 | 58 | −67 |
| DPS | Ahmed Dogan | 7.60 | 19 | +4 |
| BEL | Aleksandar Tomov | 5.50 | 14 | New |
| BBB | George Ganchev | 4.93 | 12 | −1 |
This lists parties that won seats. See the complete results below.
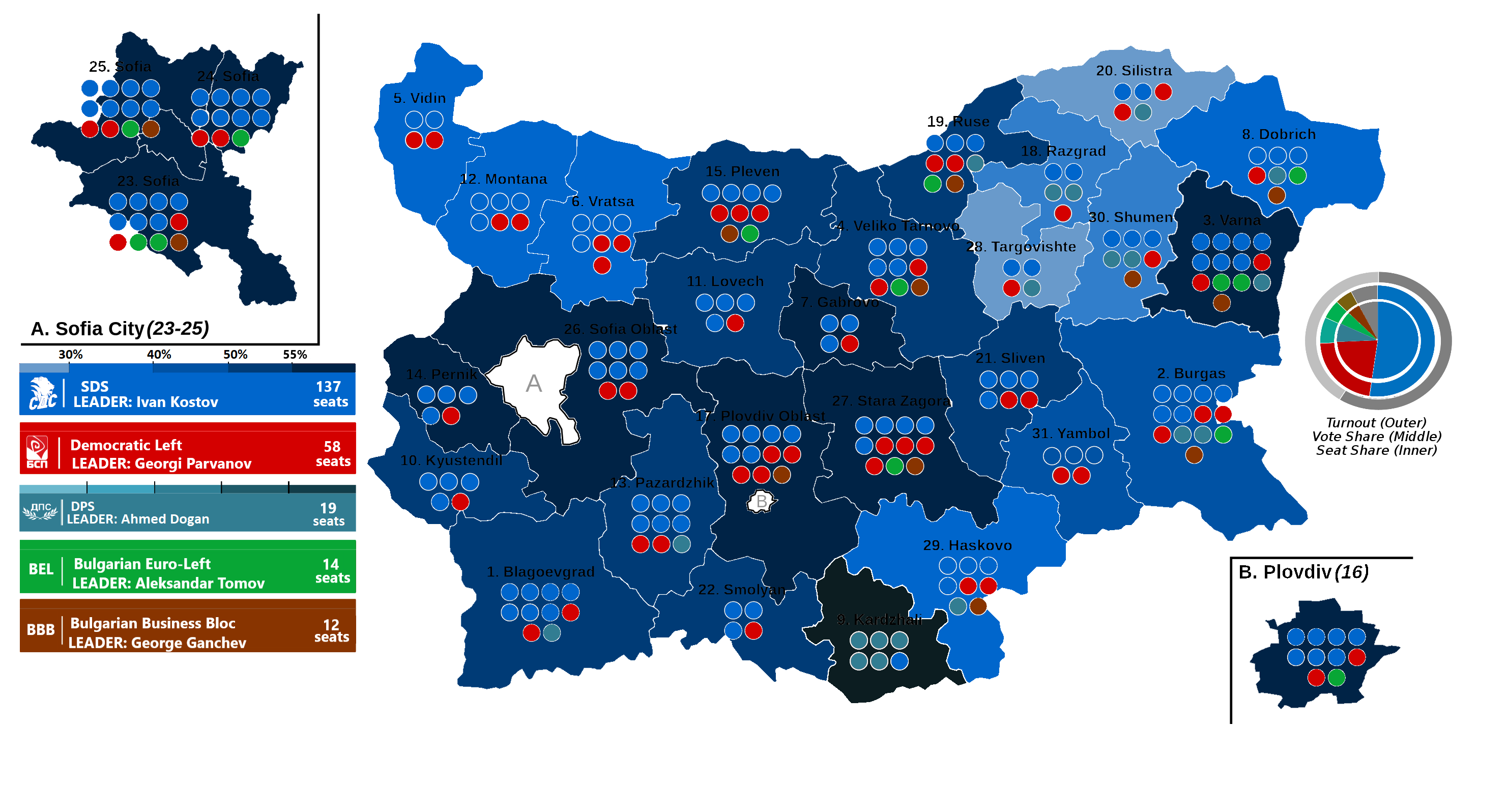
Results by constituency
| Prime Minister before | Prime Minister after |
|---|---|
| Stefan Sofiyanski; SDS (Sofiyanski Government) | Ivan Kostov; ODS (Kostov Government) |

Parliamentary elections were held in Bulgaria on 19 April 1997. The result was a victory for the United Democratic Forces (an alliance of the Union of Democratic Forces (SDS), the Democratic Party, the Bulgarian Agrarian National Union-Nikola Petkov and the Bulgarian Social Democratic Party), which won 137 of the 240 seats. Following the election, SDS leader Ivan Kostov became prime minister.

This was the last time an election has produced an outright majority in the National Assembly until 2026.

== Results ==
| Party | Votes | % | Seats | +/– |
|---|---|---|---|---|
| United Democratic Forces | 2,223,714 | 52.26 | 137 | +68 |
| Democratic Left | 939,308 | 22.07 | 58 | −67 |
| Union for National Salvation (DPS–ZP–BZNS(NP)–PDC–NI–FCB) | 323,429 | 7.60 | 19 | +4 |
| Bulgarian Euro-Left | 234,058 | 5.50 | 14 | New |
| Bulgarian Business Bloc | 209,796 | 4.93 | 12 | −1 |
| Communist Party of Bulgaria | 50,864 | 1.20 | 0 | 0 |
| Alliance for the Tsar | 46,765 | 1.10 | 0 | New |
| Bulgarian Christian Coalition | 26,614 | 0.63 | 0 | New |
| Democratic Party of Justice | 20,433 | 0.48 | 0 | 0 |
| Party of Bulgarian Women | 16,061 | 0.38 | 0 | New |
| Liberal Forum | 13,638 | 0.32 | 0 | New |
| Crowned Democracy | 11,747 | 0.28 | 0 | 0 |
| Bulgarian Workers' Socialist Party | 10,152 | 0.24 | 0 | New |
| Bulgarian Agrarian National Union–Centre | 10,062 | 0.24 | 0 | New |
| Democratic Alternative for the Republic | 9,664 | 0.23 | 0 | 0 |
| Bulgarian Party of Liberals | 7,281 | 0.17 | 0 | New |
| Bulgarian National-Radical Party | 7,099 | 0.17 | 0 | 0 |
| Bulgarian National Democratic Party | 6,875 | 0.16 | 0 | New |
| Popular Patriotic Left Front | 6,795 | 0.16 | 0 | New |
| Bulgarian Workers-Agrarian Party | 6,754 | 0.16 | 0 | 0 |
| Union for Democratic Development | 6,377 | 0.15 | 0 | New |
| Christian Democratic Union | 5,912 | 0.14 | 0 | 0 |
| Forward Bulgaria Coalition | 5,886 | 0.14 | 0 | 0 |
| Free Cooperative Party | 5,534 | 0.13 | 0 | 0 |
| Democratic League | 4,386 | 0.10 | 0 | New |
| New Democracy | 3,720 | 0.09 | 0 | New |
| Transfiguration Forum | 3,654 | 0.09 | 0 | 0 |
| Bulgarian Democratic Party for European and World States | 3,614 | 0.08 | 0 | 0 |
| Bulgarian National Ecological Party – Veliko Turnovo | 3,437 | 0.08 | 0 | New |
| Bulgarian Green Federation | 3,347 | 0.08 | 0 | New |
| Bulgarian Revolutionary Youth Party | 2,446 | 0.06 | 0 | 0 |
| Bulgarian National Movement for the Eternal Path | 2,438 | 0.06 | 0 | New |
| Bulgarian Fatherland Party – National Union | 2,301 | 0.05 | 0 | 0 |
| Front of Progressive Forces in Bulgaria | 1,135 | 0.03 | 0 | 0 |
| Alliance of the Nation – Movement of the Downtrodden | 670 | 0.02 | 0 | 0 |
| Independents | 19,335 | 0.45 | 0 | 0 |
| Total | 4,255,301 | 100.00 | 240 | 0 |
| Valid votes | 4,255,301 | 99.16 | | |
| Invalid/blank votes | 35,956 | 0.84 | | |
| Total votes | 4,291,257 | 100.00 | | |
| Registered voters/turnout | 7,289,956 | 58.87 | | |
Source: Nohlen & Stöver, University of Essex

== Aftermath ==
Following the elections, Ivan Kostov formed the Kostov Government.
