= Chairman (President) of Bulgaria =

Bulgarian politician

- Председател (президент) на България
- Coat of arms of Bulgaria (1971–1990)
- Style: His Excellency
- Residence: Sofia (office), Boyana (residential)
- Appointer: The National Assembly
- Term length: Same as the Assembly
- Precursor: State Council
- Formation: 3 April 1990
- First holder: Petar Mladenov
- Final holder: Zhelyu Zhelev
- Abolished: 22 January 1992
- Superseded by: President of Bulgaria
- Deputy: Vice Chairman (Vice President)

The Chairman (President) of the Republic of Bulgaria (Bulgarian: Председател (президент) на Републиката) was the head of state of Bulgaria from 3 April 1990 to 22 January 1992. The office was known as the Chairman (President) of the People's Republic of Bulgaria until the word "People's" was dropped from the country's name on 15 November 1990. From that point on, the office was simply the Chairman (President) of the Republic of Bulgaria.

Much like the State Council of Bulgaria superseded by it (which operated similarly to the Presidium of the Supreme Soviet of the Soviet Union), the office of Chairman (President) of Bulgaria was an executive post similar to the Presidency of the Soviet Union, as opposed to the modern Bulgarian presidency, which is ceremonial.

== Origin ==
In 1971 a new constitution was approved by a referendum and came into force on 18 May 1971. In the constitution a new state organ was formed: the State Council. This new organ effectively eclipsed the role of the National Assembly as it had both legislative and executive power. The State Council could issue decrees with full legal authority when the National Assembly was not in session, with no provision for later approval by the full legislative body. In most other Communist states, the legislature at least had the nominal power of veto when its permanent organ issued such decrees, though it was almost never exercised in practice. The chairman of the State Council served as de facto head of state.

Following a wave of democratization in Eastern Europe in 1989, dictator Todor Zhivkov was forced to resign on 10 November, succeeded by Petar Mladenov. The following month the Communist Party announced it was giving up power and began a series of round table talks with the opposition on the transition to democracy. It was decided that the State Council would have to be abolished and the office of the Chairman (President) of the Republic would have to be inaugurated.

== Powers and duties ==
The powers and duties of the office were outlined in Chapter 5 of the 1971 constitution, as amended in 1990. They were broader than those of the modern-day President of Bulgaria, but not as broad as the State Council's before 1990.

Unlike the modern-day office, which is ceremonial, the chairmanship (presidency) was an executive post similar to the presidency of the Soviet Union, which itself was based on a mixture of the US and French presidencies.

Prior to the creation of the post of Chairman (President), the de jure head of state of the People's Republic of Bulgaria was the chairman of the Presidium of the National Assembly under the 1947 Dimitrov Constitution, and later, the Chairman of the State Council of the People's Republic of Bulgaria under the 1971 Zhivkov Constitution, who was often called the "president" by western sources. For most of the PRB's existence, all effective executive political power was in the hands of the General Secretary of the Bulgarian Communist Party. The chairman of the Presidium of the National Assembly exercised largely symbolic and figurehead duties, but during the State Council's existence, the general secretaries serving at the time—Todor Zhivkov and Petar Mladenov—simultaneously served as State Council chairman during their time in office. In such a situation, the State Council was analogous to the current power structure in China, where the country's paramount leader serves as President, but derives his real power from his post as party leader.

The chairman (president) was elected by the National Assembly by a two-thirds majority, for the same term as the Assembly which elected him.

The chairman (president)'s powers were:

- Commander in chief of the armed forces
- The ability to propose the Prime Minister (who would then have to be elected by the National Assembly)
- The ability, during the National Assembly's recess, to appoint and dismiss government ministers on the advice of the Prime Minister (subject to subsequent confirmation by the Assembly)
- The nation's top representative abroad, with the ability to sign international treaties
- The ability to call for national referendums on important issues
- The ability to assign military ranks and honorary titles
- The power to restore citizenship to exiles or internal dissidents
- The ability to overrule government decisions that violated the constitution or endangered citizens rights and freedoms

== Office Holders ==
Denotes Acting Head of State

Head of State			Term of office			Duration	Political party
Nº	Portrait	Name (Born–Died)	Election	Took office	Left office	Duration	Political party
Chairman of the State Council
1		Todor Zhivkov; Тодор Живков (1911–1998)	—	7 July 1971	17 November 1989	18 years, 133 days	Bulgarian Communist Party
2		Petar Mladenov; Петър Младенов (1936–2000)	—	17 November 1989	3 April 1990	137 days	Bulgarian Communist Party
Chairman (President) of the Republic
1		Petar Mladenov; Петър Младенов (1936–2000)	(Apr) 1990	3 April 1990	6 July 1990	94 days	Bulgarian Socialist Party
—		Stanko Todorov; Станко Тодоров (1920–1996)	—	6 July 1990	17 July 1990	11 days	Bulgarian Socialist Party
—		Nikolai Todorov; Николай Тодоров (1921–2003)	—	17 July 1990	1 August 1990	15 days	Independent
2		Zhelyu Zhelev; Желю Желев (1935–2015)	(Jul-Aug) 1990	1 August 1990	22 January 1992	1 year, 174 days	Union of Democratic Forces

On 3 April 1990 Petar Mladenov, having previously served as the Chairman of the State Council, was elected as the first Chairman (President) of the Republic, serving until his resignation in July. His resignation came after a video surfaced suggesting the use of tanks against anti-government demonstration in December 1989.

Stanko Todorov was selected to serve as acting Chairman of the Republic until a successor could be chosen. He too, had to be replaced by another acting chairman, Nikolai Todorov, following his resignation for health reasons. Finally, on 1 August a compromise was reached and Zhelyu Zhelev, until then leader of the opposition party, the Union of Democratic Forces, was elected chairman. Zhelev was in office until he was sworn in on 22 January 1992 as President of Bulgaria, under the new constitution, following his direct election by the public three days before.
