= 1990 Bulgarian Constitutional Assembly election =

- 10 June 1990
- All 400 seats in the Grand National Assembly; 201 seats needed for a majority
- Turnout: 90.79%
Party	Leader	Vote %	Seats
BSP	Alexander Lilov	47.15	211
SDS	Zhelyu Zhelev	36.21	144
DPS	Ahmed Dogan	8.03	23
BZNS	Viktor Valkov	6.02	16
OPT		0.60	1
OF	Guinio Ganev	–	2
BSDP	Peter Dertliev	–	1
Independents	–	–	2
This lists parties that won seats. See the complete results below.
Prime Minister before	Prime Minister after
Andrey Lukanov; BSP	Dimitar Popov; Independent

Constitutional Assembly elections were held in Bulgaria on 10 June 1990, with a second round for eighteen seats on 17 June. They were the first elections held since the fall of Communism the previous winter, and the first free national elections since 1931. The elections were held to elect the 7th Grand National Assembly, tasked with adopting a new (democratic) constitution. The new electoral system was changed from 400 single-member constituencies used during the Communist era to a split system whereby half were elected in single member constituencies and half by proportional representation.

The result was a victory for the Bulgarian Socialist Party, the freshly renamed Communist Party, which won 211 of the 400 seats. The Grand National Assembly drafted the country's fourth constitution, which was promulgated on 12 July 1991. The first elections under the new document were held three months later.

Three Romani people were elected to the Constitutional Assembly in the 1990 election: Manush Romanov from the Union of Democratic Forces and Sabi Golemanov and Petar Aleksandrov from the BSP.

== Results ==
Party	Proportional			Constituency			Total seats	+/–
Party	Votes	%	Seats	Votes	%	Seats	Total seats	+/–
Bulgarian Socialist Party	2,887,766	47.15	97	2,775,465	45.57	114	211	New
Union of Democratic Forces	2,217,798	36.21	75	2,188,547	35.94	69	144	New
Movement for Rights and Freedoms	491,597	8.03	12	498,017	8.18	11	23	New
Bulgarian Agrarian National Union	368,929	6.02	16	326,420	5.36	0	16	−83
Patriotic Party of Labour	36,668	0.60	0	47,713	0.78	1	1	New
Alternative Socialist Party	22,064	0.36	0	125,343	2.06	0	0	New
Alternative Socialist Alliance	16,061	0.26	0	125,343	2.06	0	0	New
Liberal Party – Pernik	15,034	0.25	0	125,343	2.06	0	0	New
Union of Disabled	10,466	0.17	0	125,343	2.06	0	0	New
Union of Non-Party Members	9,978	0.16	0	125,343	2.06	0	0	New
Parliamentary Movement for the Tarnovo Constitution	8,354	0.14	0	125,343	2.06	0	0	New
Non-Party Members for Democracy Movement	8,195	0.13	0	125,343	2.06	0	0	New
Political Opposition Bloc (Centre)	6,043	0.10	0	125,343	2.06	0	0	New
Bulgarian National Democratic Party	4,723	0.08	0	125,343	2.06	0	0	New
Union of Democratic Parties and Movements "Era-3"	4,521	0.07	0	125,343	2.06	0	0	New
Bulgarian National Radical Party	3,827	0.06	0	125,343	2.06	0	0	New
Christian Republican Party	3,534	0.06	0	125,343	2.06	0	0	New
Social Democratic Party Non-Marxists	3,036	0.05	0	125,343	2.06	0	0	New
Union of Non-Party Guarantees	1,929	0.03	0	125,343	2.06	0	0	New
Bulgarian Christian Democratic Party (Centre)	1,563	0.03	0	125,343	2.06	0	0	New
Bulgarian Revolutionary Youth Party	640	0.01	0	125,343	2.06	0	0	New
Free Democratic Party	586	0.01	0	125,343	2.06	0	0	New
United People's Union	334	0.01	0	125,343	2.06	0	0	New
National Patriotic Union	319	0.01	0	125,343	2.06	0	0	New
Organisation of the Ill and Weak	287	0.00	0	125,343	2.06	0	0	New
National Party of Labour	249	0.00	0	125,343	2.06	0	0	New
Fatherland Front				32,192	0.53	2	2	−274
Social Democratic Party				20,225	0.33	1	1	+1
Independents				76,197	1.25	2	2	−23
Total	6,124,501	100.00	200	6,090,119	100.00	200	400	0
Valid votes	6,124,501	96.70		6,090,119	96.14			
Invalid/blank votes	208,833	3.30		244,296	3.86			
Total votes	6,333,334	100.00		6,334,415	100.00			
Registered voters/turnout	6,976,620	90.78		6,976,620	90.79			
Source: University of Essex, Rose & Munro, Duverger, Stoichev, 168 Chasa
