= July–August 1990 Bulgarian presidential election =

- President
- 24 July–1 August 1990

400 members of the Grand National Assembly 267 votes needed to win
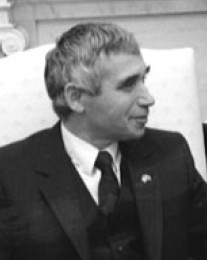
Nominee	Zhelyu Zhelev
Party	SDS
Electoral vote	284
President before election
Nikolai Todorov (acting)
Independent
Elected President
Zhelyu Zhelev
SDS
- Vice-President
- 1 August 1990
Nominee	Atanas Semerdzhiev
Party	BSP
Electoral vote	383
Vice President before election
None
Elected Vice President
Atanas Semerdzhiev
BSP

Indirect presidential elections were held in Bulgaria in July and August 1990. A new president and vice president were elected by members of the Grand National Assembly following the resignation of president Petar Mladenov on 20 July 1990 less than four months after he was elected in April. Voting took place over six rounds, with no candidate able to achieve a two-thirds majority until the sixth and final round when Zhelyu Zhelev was the sole candidate.

== Candidates ==
On 30 July Alexander Lilov stated on behalf of the parliamentary group of the Bulgarian Socialist Party that the decision to withdraw the candidacy of Chavdar Kjuranov was "driven by the desire and the will of our party to get out of the outlined presidential crisis and today to elect president our republic." Lilov added that, "we will support one of the two candidates who puts politics of national consensus above party interests."

The next day, Peter Dertliev also withdrew his candidacy.

On 31 July Elena Kircheva reported the withdrawal of the candidature of Viktor Valkov on behalf of the parliamentary group of Agrarians, with Valkov saying "I do not feel confident enough at this time to proceed to the leadership of the country given that I see now in parliament a group of about 130 people on whose support I probably will not count."

On 31 July Stoyan Ganev nominated Zhelyu Zhelev as a candidate for head of state on behalf of the Union of Democratic Forces. On 1 August Prime Minister Andrei Lukanov said that the parliamentary group of the Socialist Party would support Zhelev, Viktor Valkov doing this on behalf of the BAP, BSP and UDF, and Julius Bahnev – on behalf of MRF. This provided the required majority and Zhelev was elected to the post.

== Results ==
Candidate	Party	First round	Second round	Third round	Fourth round	Fifth round	Sixth round
Chavdar Kjuranov	Bulgarian Socialist Party	217	211	190	194		
Peter Dertliev	Bulgarian Social Democratic Party	130	131	146	146	130	
Viktor Valkov	Bulgarian Agrarian National Union	36	37	41	37	254	
Zhelyu Zhelev	Union of Democratic Forces						284
Against		1		1			108
Total		390	384	387	384	386	392

== Election of Vice President ==
In the original nomination BSP nominated for vice president Velko Valkanov, UDF – Petar Beron and Agrarian not rising contender. Upon withdrawal of the presidential candidates Chavdar Kjuranov Peter Dertliev and Viktor Valkov and nominating Zhelyu Zhelev also not available candidate for deputy. On August 1, immediately after being elected, Zhelyu Zhelev available for VP General Atanas Semerdzhiev. His nomination is subject to an open vote by show of hands and he was elected with the votes of 383 deputies, 7 vote "against" and 2 abstain.
