= Atanas Semerdzhiev =

- Атанас Семерджиев

Vice President of Bulgaria
- In office 1 August 1990 – 22 January 1992
- President: Zhelyu Zhelev
- Prime Minister: Andrey Lukanov; Dimitar Iliev Popov; Philip Dimitrov
- Preceded by: Position Established
- Succeeded by: Blaga Dimitrova

Minister of the Interior
- In office 27 December 1989 – 2 August 1990
- Prime Minister: Georgi Atanasov; Andrey Lukanov
- Preceded by: Georgi Tanev
- Succeeded by: Stoyan Stoyanov

Chief of the General Staff of the Bulgarian People's Army
- In office 22 March 1962 – 28 December 1989
- Preceded by: Ivan Vrachev
- Succeeded by: Hristo Dobrev

Personal details
- Born: Atanas Georgiev Semerdzhiev; 21 May 1924 Lûzhene, near Velingrad, Bulgaria
- Died: 8 May 2015 (aged 90) Sofia, Bulgaria
- Party: Bulgarian Communist Party (1943-1990); Bulgarian Socialist Party (1990-1992); Independent (1992-2015)

Military service
- Branch/service: Bulgarian People's Army
- Years of service: 1942 - 1989
- Rank: Colonel General
- Commands: Chief of the General Staff of the Bulgarian People's Army

Atanas Georgiev Semerdzhiev (21 May 1924 – 8 May 2015) was a Bulgarian general, statesman and politician. He was a veteran of World War II, as he participated in the Partisan Movement in Bulgaria during 1942–1944. During the same period he became the commander of the Chepinets Partisan Brigade, as he fought against the Tsardom of Bulgaria and Nazi Germany. He is the longest-serving Chief of the General Staff of the Bulgarian People's Army (1962–1989), first deputy minister of defence (1966–1989), member of the Central Committee of the BKP (1962–1990) and the Supreme Council of the Bulgarian Socialist Party (1990–1992), Minister of Interior (1989–1990), first vice president of Bulgaria (1990–1992) elected by the National Assembly. People's representative in the VII Supreme Court and V-IX Supreme Court. He is the author of memoirs and military-theoretical works.

== Early life ==
Atanas Semerdzhiev was born on May 21, 1924, in the village of Ladzhene, today a district of Velingrad. He comes from a poor clerical family. His father was a servant, a member of the BRP (k.) after September 9, 1944, and his mother was a housewife, also a member of the BRP (k.). He studied at the Pazardzhik High School, where he has been an active member of the Workers' Youth Union (RMS) since 1939. He has an incomplete general - secondary real education.

He was detained by the police in October 1941 with a group of comrades, but did not testify. He went out illegally from December 16, 1941, and from April 1942 he was a partisan in the Rhodope partisan unit "Anton Ivanov". From 1943, he was a member of the BRP (so-called) and commander of the "Bratya Krastini" detachment, which grew into the "Chepinets" partisan brigade. After that he was the commander of the brigade.

== Military Activity ==
In 1944, he participated in the Second World War against Nazi Germany, as an assistant company commander in the 27th Infantry Regiment (from September to December 1944). After that, he completed his education, completed a military short course at the National University "V. Levski" (January–September 1946). He received a high school diploma in Pazardzhik and again entered service in the Bulgarian army. From January 1 to October 1, 1946, he was a member of the OC of the BRP (k.) and a member of the OC of the RMS. Between November 1946 and January 1948 he was a company commander in the Intelligence Directorate of the Ministry of Defence. Until January 1, 1948, he worked as an assistant section chief in the Intelligence Department of the General Staff.

From January 1, 1948, to December 6, 1950, he graduated in the USSR from the prestigious Frunze Military Academy, and in 1958-1960 - the Military Academy of the General Staff of the Armed Forces of the USSR. From December 1950 to June 1951, he was a brigade commander in the Intelligence Directorate. From June 1951, he was appointed deputy head of the Operational Department for operational preparation and control and head of the Information Department (6th Department) of the Intelligence Department. He remained in this position until November 1952, when he was appointed Deputy Chief of the Operational Directorate of the General Staff for Operational Training and Control. From 1953 to 1960 he was the head of the Operational Department of the General Staff. Between 1960 and 1962 he was the Chief of Staff of the Second Army in Plovdiv. After 1962, he was Chief of the General Staff for 27 years.

== Political Activity ==
From November 5, 1962, Lieutenant-General Semerdzhiev was a candidate member of the Central Committee of the BKP and first deputy minister of national defense. After November 19, 1966, he was a full member of the party committee.

After the Fall of Communism and the change of the political system in the fall of 1989, in the countries of the so-called Eastern Bloc saw some changes in the nomenclature structures established until then by the existing repressive power. In Bulgaria, these events are associated with the date November 10, 1989, when Todor Zhivkov was released from the position of general secretary in the party (de facto head of state of the country).On December 27, 1989, Gen. Atanas Semerdzhiev was appointed Minister of Internal Affairs in the government of Georgi Atanasov (June 1986 – February 1990). From January 29, 1990, with a top secret memo of particular importance, Gen. Atanas Semerdzhiev orders the files of the State Security (DS) agent apparatus to be purged. A few years later, a case was filed against General Semerdzhiev in connection with this order of his, issued in his capacity as Minister of Internal Affairs of Bulgaria.

Atanas Semerdzhiev held the post of Minister of Internal Affairs again under the next government - the first government of Andrey Lukanov (February 8, 1990 – August 2, 1990). After the renaming of the BKP, he remained a member of the Supreme Council of the BSP.

=== Vice President ===
In August 1990, after the resignation of Petar Mladenov, as a result of a compromise political agreement between the ruling BSP and the opposition, which allowed Atanas Semerdzhiev to be elected vice president, and Zhelyu Zhelev, the leader of the opposition Union of Democratic Forces, to be president. He was dismissed from the Bulgarian Army with the rank of colonel general.

=== Agency Activity ===
With Decision No. 7 of July 19, 2007, of the commission for disclosure of documents and for declaring the affiliation of Bulgarian citizens to the State Security and Intelligence Services of the BNA, the agent activity of Atanas Georgiev Semerdzhiev in his capacity as the content of a report under the name " The Nightingale". His name also appears in Decision No. 14 of September 4, 2007, of the same commission.

== Lawsuit ==
In 1992, the prosecutor's office began an investigation into the destruction of the files of the communist State Security against General Semerdzhiev and the head of the Third Department ("Archives") of the DS, General Nanka Serkejieva. A trial begins on accusations that, in his capacity as Minister of the Interior, Atanas Semerdzhiev ordered the destruction of 134,102 intelligence files. The reason for this is a strictly secret report of particular importance No. IV - 68 by the Deputy Minister Gen. l-th St. Savov, which was prepared by the Archives Department and approved by General Semerdzhiev as Minister of Internal Affairs. It proposes, due to the complicated political and operational situation, to destroy the work files of foreign citizens, as well as the personal and work files of secret collaborators - Bulgarian citizens, from the files of the excluded agency. For the destroyed cases, prepare formalized replacement cards without names, but only with pseudonyms and a registration number, to be microfilmed. The restructuring to create a reserve fund in which to preserve all important documents under the direction of gen. Nanka Serkejieva as head of the Archives Department. The fund was taken to a secret facility of the Ministry of Internal Affairs far from Sofia. Ten years later, on April 11, 2002, the Supreme Court of Cassation sentenced General Semerdzhiev to imprisonment for 4 years and 6 months, and to Gen. Serkejieva - 2 years, under a general regime of serving The two were found guilty of abuse of power and exceeding their official powers, due to the destruction of 144,235 files in 1990. Semerdzhiev was placed under house arrest, which lasted for two and a half years, after which the measure ended being replaced by signature and money guarantee. They appealed and the Supreme Court established that the sentences pronounced were the result of political intent and were legally untenable. In 2003, the sentence was overturned, the case was returned to the prosecutor's office for further investigation and was not brought to court again. The new restraining order was lifted in the spring of 2005, and the case was finally dismissed in 2006.

== Family ==
Atanas Semerdzhiev has one brother and two sisters. His brother and sister Slavka are members of the BKP. His other sister is a member of the DKMS. His wife comes from an official family and is Jewish by nationality. Her father is a teacher, and her mother is a pharmacist - a member of the BKP. As a 4th and 5th grade student, she herself is a member of "Brannik", but there are no fascist manifestations. She is a member of the OF. Her uncle, her mother's brother, was a worker in Switzerland in 1927–1928. They later divorced.

He died on 8 May 2015.

Political offices
Preceded by Position established	Vice President of Bulgaria; 1 August 1990 – 22 January 1992	Succeeded by Blaga Dimitrova
