= Boyko Dimitrov =

Bulgarian politician (1941–2025)

- Бойко Димитров

Minister of Foreign Affairs
- In office 17 November 1989 – 22 September 1990
- Preceded by: Petar Mladenov
- Succeeded by: Lyuben Gotsev

Member of the Grand National Assembly of Bulgaria
- In office 10 July 1990 – 2 October 1991

Personal details
- Born: Boyko Georgiev Dimitrov; 5 June 1941 Pleven, Bulgaria
- Died: 18 January 2025 (aged 83) Sofia, Bulgaria
- Party: BCP; BSP
- Education: Moscow State Institute of International Relations
- Occupation: Diplomat

Boyko Georgiev Dimitrov (Bulgarian: Бойко Георгиев Димитров; 5 June 1941 – 18 January 2025) was a Bulgarian politician. A member of the Bulgarian Communist Party and later the Bulgarian Socialist Party, he served as minister of foreign affairs from 1989 to 1990 and was a member of the Grand National Assembly from 1990 to 1991.

Dimitrov died in Sofia on 18 January 2025, at the age of 83.

Political offices
| Preceded by Petar Mladenov | Minister of Foreign Affairs of Bulgaria; 1989–1990 | Succeeded by Lyuben Gotsev |
