= Todor Kavaldzhiev =

Vice President of Bulgaria from 1997 to 2002

- Тодор Кавалджиев
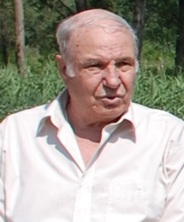
- Kavaldzhiev in 2008

Vice President of Bulgaria
- In office 22 January 1997 – 22 January 2002
- President: Petar Stoyanov
- Prime Minister: Zhan Videnov; Stefan Sofiyanski (Acting); Ivan Kostov; Simeon Sakskoburggotski
- Preceded by: Blaga Dimitrova (Note: Office vacant from 6 July 1993 to 22 January 1997.)
- Succeeded by: Angel Marin

Personal details
- Born: 26 January 1934 Glavan, Tsardom of Bulgaria
- Died: 6 February 2019 (aged 85) Sofia, Republic of Bulgaria
- Party: Union of Democratic Forces (1996–2019)
- Spouse: Filareta Kavaldzhieva
- Children: 1

Todor Kolev Kavaldzhiev (Bulgarian: Тодор Колев Кавалджиев; 26 January 1934 – 6 February 2019) was the vice president of Bulgaria from 1997 until 2002. He was a partner to President Petar Stoyanov. He was proven to be an anti-communist, due to being repressed during the communist era in Bulgaria. He was also an activist into restoring the BZNS Nikola Petkov.

== Early life ==
Todor Kavaldzhiev was born in Glavan, Tsardom of Bulgaria in 26 January 1934. He was a pro-BZNS activist during his teens, as he vowed to restore the Agrarian Youth Wing, which failed due to his arrest and imprisonment in 1952. He was first sent to the prison in Haskovo, then he spent 11 years in Pazardzhik and Stara Zagora. He was sent to Belene labour camp twice, where harsh labour was implemented. From 1952 to 1963, he was sued and then imprisoned. Todor was amnestied, then released out of prison. He worked as a builder for Sofstroi, a construction company located in Sofia from 1965 to 1966 for just one year.

During the period of 1966-1970, he followed and graduated economics in Svishtov. 3 years later, he graduated with a major in "Accounting and mechanization and automation of management work". During 1970-1973 and 1982-1983 he became a organizer-designer in the factory Сърп и чук, which translates to Sickle and hammer. in Stara Zagora. After that, to 1975, he worked in the forestry in his home village, Glavan.

From the periods of 1975 to 1982 he worked as chief accountant in the factory Lenin in Nikolaevo. During 1983-1990, he worked as an economist in the plant ОПОСО in Stara Zagora.

== Politics ==
In 1989, Kavaldzhiev addressed to the prime minister Georgi Atanasov via radio Svobodna Evropa to remove the law of the dispersal of the BZNS Nikola Petkov and amnesty to the sued BZNS members. He would be elected as the People's Representative of the VII Great National Assembly. To 1992, he was a member of the permanent presence of BZNS Nikola Petkov. From 1992, he assumed the duties of the secretary in the party. Kavaldzhiev was one of the first people to publicly address the mismanagement of the Union of Democratic Forces. He became a candidate for vice president of the UDF. Together with Petar Stoyanov, they won the 1996 elections in a runoff.

=== Vice President ===
After becoming vice president, he began assisting Petar Stoyanov in his duties. He first warned about corrupt practices and that ex-communists most actively take control of enterprises and facilities in the process of privatization, often simply draining and destroying them.

== Notes ==
Political offices
Preceded by Blaga Dimitrova	Vice President of Bulgaria; 22 January 1997 – 22 January 2002	Succeeded by Angel Marin
