= Nikolay Todorov =

Nikolay Todorov may refer to:

- Nikolay Todorov (footballer, born 1964), Bulgarian midfielder and manager
- Nikolay Todorov (footballer, born 1996), Bulgarian forward

== See also ==
- Nikolai Todorov (1921–2003), President of Bulgaria
