= Patriotic Party of Labour =

Bulgarian political party

The Patriotic Party of Labour (Bulgarian: Отечествена партия на труда, Otechestvena partiya na truda, OPT) was a political party in Bulgaria.

== History ==
The party was established after the end of the Communist era as the political arm of the Committee for the Defence of National Interests. It contested the 1990 Constitutional elections, winning a single seat.

For the 1991 elections the party joined the Pre-Electoral Union, an alliance led by the Bulgarian Socialist Party. The alliance finished in second place, winning 106 of the 240 seats.

The party did not contest any further elections until 2001, when it received just 0.04% of the vote.
