= State Council of the People's Republic of Bulgaria =

1971–1989 collective head of state of Bulgaria

The State Council (Bulgarian: Държавен съвет) was the standing organ of the Bulgarian National Assembly from 1971 to 1990. It was the collective head of state before the creation of the office of Chairman (President) in 1990. It operated similarly to the Presidium of the Supreme Soviet of the Soviet Union.

== History ==
The decision to create a State Council was made at a meeting of the Central Committee of the Bulgarian Communist Party in 1968. It was created by the 1971 Zhivkov Constitution, taking over most of the powers performed by the Presidium of the National Assembly. It was formed to reinforce the philosophy of democratic centralism as specified by the committee. Members were elected to the first State Council on 8 July 1971, after the new constitution was approved via a national referendum held in May 1971.

In April 1990, the State Council was abolished and replaced by the office of president of the republic.

== Members ==
The State Council consisted of the following:

- Chairman
- First Vice-chairmen
- Vice-chairmen
- Secretary
- Members

The position of chairman was synonymous with the General Secretary of the Bulgarian Communist Party. In such a situation, the State Council was analogous to the current power structure in China, where the country's paramount leader serves as President, but derives his real power from his post as party leader. Members of the State Council are all the members and candidate members of the Politburo of the Central Committee of the BKP.

=== Secretaries ===
Secretary of the State Council:

- Nikola Manolov (1976–1989)
- Angel Dimitrov (December 17, 1989 – April 3, 1990)

== Powers ==
The State Council was officially defined as an executive committee of the Assembly. The Constitution vested the State Council with the power to issue decrees in lieu of law whenever the National Assembly was not in session. It was not required to submit these decrees to the full National Assembly for approval. In most other Communist states, the full legislature had the power to veto such decrees at its next session, though this power was almost never exercised in practice.

As chairman of the council for nearly all of its existence, Todor Zhivkov served as Supreme Commander in Chief of the Bulgarian People's Army.
