= Great National Assembly =

Great National Assembly or Grand National Assembly may refer to:

- Great National Assembly of Alba Iulia, an assembly of Romanian delegates that declared the unification of Transylvania and Romania
- Great National Assembly (Romania), the legislature of the Socialist Republic of Romania
- Grand National Assembly of Turkey, the unicameral Turkish legislature
- Grand National Assembly of Bulgaria, a special convention of the National Assembly
