= Margarita Popova =

Bulgarian politician

- Маргарита Попова
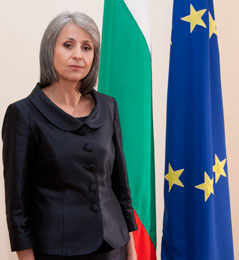
- Official portrait, 2012

Vice President of Bulgaria
- In office 22 January 2012 – 22 January 2017
- President: Rosen Plevneliev
- Prime Minister: Boyko Borisov; Marin Raykov; Plamen Oresharski; Georgi Bliznashki; Boyko Borisov
- Preceded by: Angel Marin
- Succeeded by: Iliana Iotova

Minister of Justice
- In office 27 July 2009 – 29 November 2011
- Prime Minister: Boyko Borisov
- Preceded by: Miglena Tacheva
- Succeeded by: Diana Kovacheva

Personal details
- Born: 15 May 1957 (age 69) Velingrad, Bulgaria
- Party: Citizens for European Development of Bulgaria
- Spouse: Yordan Popov
- Education: Sofia University
- Profession: Philologist, Jurist

Margarita Stefanova Popova (Bulgarian: Маргарита Стефанова Попова; born 15 May 1957) is a Bulgarian jurist, prosecutor, educator who was the vice president of Bulgaria from 2012 to 2017. She previously served as Minister of Justice from 27 July 2009 to 4 September 2011 in the cabinet of Boyko Borisov. As the running mate of presidential candidate Rosen Plevneliev in the October 2011 presidential election, she was elected as vice president and took office in January 2012.

== Biography ==
Margarita Popova graduated Bulgarian philology in University of Sofia in 1980, and later (1989) law in the same university. She was appointed prosecutor in Pirdop in 1990, in 1991 she was a regional prosecutor in Ruse, and administrative head and regional prosecutor in Sofia district from 1996 to 2006. She studied law under communism and is an expert on communist law. She carries on her expertise on communist law in her work as vice-president.

She was lecturer in the National Police Academy (2001–2004) and National Institute of Justice (2005–2009).

Political offices
| Preceded by Angel Marin | Vice President of Bulgaria; 2012–2017 | Succeeded by Iliana Iotova |
