= Angel Marin =

Bulgarian politician (1942–2024)

- Ангел Марин
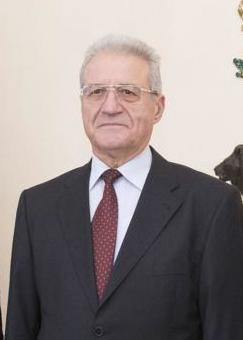
- Marin in 2018

Vice President of Bulgaria
- In office 22 January 2002 – 22 January 2012
- President: Georgi Parvanov
- Prime Minister: Simeon Sakskoburggotski; Sergey Stanishev; Boyko Borisov
- Preceded by: Todor Kavaldzhiev
- Succeeded by: Margarita Popova

Personal details
- Born: Angel Ivanov Marin; 8 January 1942 Batak, Pazardzhik, Bulgaria
- Died: 18 March 2024 (aged 82)
- Party: Bulgarian Socialist Party (1990–2002); Independent (2012–2024)
- Profession: Officer; Politician

Angel Marin (Bulgarian: Ангел Марин; 8 January 1942 – 18 March 2024) was a Bulgarian political figure who was the vice president of Bulgaria from 2002 to 2012. He took office in 2002 together with President Georgi Parvanov, and they were re-elected for a second term in 2007.

== Life and career ==
Marin was born in Batak and completed his high school education in Devin in 1960. From 1960 until 1965 he attended the Higher Military Artillery School in Shumen, majoring in Ground Artillery. In addition, he received a Civilian degree in Radio Electronics Engineering.

Between 1974 and 1978 he attended The Military Artillery Academy in Saint Petersburg. He graduated with distinction and a gold medal in "Command of Chief of Staff HQ and Operative-Tactical". He received a University degree in military education.

By the end of July 2011, President Parvanov and Vice President Marin, who had been delegated the presidential power to issue pardons, had pardoned 431 criminals.

Marin died on 18 March 2024, at the age of 82.

Political offices
Preceded by Todor Kavaldzhiev	Vice President of Bulgaria; 22 January 2002 – 22 January 2012	Succeeded by Margarita Popova
