= Party of Bulgarian Social Democrats =

Bulgarian political party

Party of Bulgarian Social Democrats Партия Български социалдемократи
- Founded: 1998
- Split from: Bulgarian Social Democratic Party
- Headquarters: Sofia, Bulgaria
- Ideology: Social democracy
- International affiliation: Socialist International (until 2011)
- Colours: Red

Website
- http://www.pbs-d.bg

The Party of Bulgarian Social Democrats (Bulgarian: Партия Български социалдемократи, Partiya Balgarski Sotsialdemokrati, PBSD) is a social-democratic political party in Bulgaria.

The party emerged from a left-wing split within the Bulgarian Social Democratic Party. Leader Petar Dertliev pursued an alliance with the centre-left Coalition for Bulgaria, while the party's right-wing continued to hold ties with the United Democratic Forces and kept the original name.
