= Chavdar Kyuranov =

Bulgarian sociologist and politician

Chavdar Kyuranov Чавдар Кюранов

Personal details
- Born: Chavdar Yordanov Kyuranov; 16 May 1921 Sofia, Bulgaria
- Died: 23 March 2004 (aged 82) Sofia, Bulgaria
- Party: Bulgarian Communist Party (1948-1988/1989-1990) Independent (1988–1989) Bulgarian Socialist Party (1990–2004)
- Profession: Jurist, politician

Chavdar Kyuranov (Bulgarian: Чавдар Кюранов; 16 May 1921, Sofia, Bulgaria) is a Bulgarian sociologist and politician, member of the Bulgarian Communist Party and Bulgarian Socialist Party.

== Biography ==
Chavdar Kyuranov studied law at Sofia University. From 1956 to 1965 he was a researcher at the Economic Institute at the Bulgarian Academy of Sciences. Then he started working at the Institute of Sociology, and from 1971 to 1988 headed the section "Sociology of labor." Meanwhile, lecturer of Sociology of Labor at Sofia University. Kyuranov is Professor, Doctor of Philosophy. He was vice president of the International Council of Social Sciences at UNESCO.

Kyuranov is a member of the Bulgarian Communist Party since 1948. A representative of Bulgaria in the Economic Commission of Europe to the UN in Geneva (1965–1971), Senior Advisor to the Council of Human Resources at the State Council of the PRB (1971–1982). In 1988 he was expelled from the Communist Party, but next year's membership was restored. He was a member of the Supreme Council of the Bulgarian Socialist Party (1990–1998) and Chairman of the Union for Social Democracy in BSP deputy chairman of the BSP (1990–1991).

Kyuranov is a founding member of the Club for Support of Glasnost and Perestroika (3 November 1988) and an opponent of the inclusion of this organization in the UDF. Take part in the roundtable – the first consultative and preparatory meeting is the delegation of the UDF, but then left the club.

MP from Varna in the 7th Grand National Assembly and Deputy Chairman of the demographic problems in this Parliament. MP from Burgas in the 36th, 37th and 38th National Assemblies.

Presidential candidate of the Socialist Party in the second election for president in Bulgarian presidential election, July–August 1990.

Kyuranov died on 23 March 2004 in Sofia at 82 years old.
