= Blaga Dimitrova =

Bulgarian poet and politician (1922–2003)

- Блага Димитрова

Vice President of Bulgaria
- In office 22 January 1992 – 6 July 1993
- President: Zhelyu Zhelev
- Prime Minister: Philip Dimitrov; Lyuben Berov
- Preceded by: Atanas Semerdzhiev
- Succeeded by: Todor Kavaldzhiev (Note: Office vacant from 6 July 1993 to 22 January 1997.)

Personal details
- Born: 2 January 1922 Byala Slatina, Bulgaria
- Died: 2 May 2003 (aged 81) Sofia, Bulgaria
- Resting place: Central Sofia Cemetery
- Party: Union of Democratic Forces
- Spouse: Yordan Vassilev
- Children: 1 (adopted)
- Education: Sofia University
- Occupation: Poet; Politician

Blaga Nikolova Dimitrova (Bulgarian: Блага Димитрова; 2 January 1922 – 2 May 2003) was a Bulgarian poet and the vice president of Bulgaria from 1992 until 1993.

== Early life and education ==
Dimitrova was born on 2 January 1922 in Byala Slatina, Bulgaria. She graduated high school in Sofia in 1941. During the same year in autumn, she enrolled in the Sofia University St. Kliment Ohridski, where she studied Slavic philology until graduation in 1945. She continued her studies at the Maxim Gorky Literature Institute in Moscow, as she defended a dissertation on "Mayakovsky and Bulgarian poetry" in 1951. On her return to Bulgaria, she joined the editorial staff of the monthly magazine of the Bulgarian Writers' Association. In 1962 she joined the editorial staff of the association's publishing house, where she tried to publish the works of young authors who had fallen out of favour with the censors.

== Intellectual career ==
In 1963, after the tirade against the country's intellectuals by the Secretary of the Bulgarian Communist Party, Todor Zhivkov, the publishing house suspended publications and Blaga left her job in protest and moved to another publishing firm. In 1965 she published her first book, Journey to Oneself. During the Vietnam War she visited that country several times, adopted a young Vietnamese orphan and then published several works resulting from her observations. For many years she worked as an editor in various newspapers, magazines, and publishing houses. Dimitrova was engaged in translation and social work, and compiled anthologies.

In February 1989 Blaga Dimitrova was one of 102 Bulgarian intellectuals to sign an appeal in defence of Václav Havel.

On 5 May 1989, her husband was arrested because he was the chief editor of the journal Democracy, an organ of the Association of Democratic Forces.

On 20 January 1989, she was invited, together with a group of intellectuals, to a meeting known as the “breakfast” with French President François Mitterrand. The event was later referenced by the Social Democratic Union (SDS) as a symbolic moment in its formation. Dimitrova subsequently participated in organized public rallies during the period of democratic change.

== Vice President ==
In the presidential elections held on 19 January 1992, Dimitrova was elected vice-president and Zhelyu Zhelev was elected president of the Republic of Bulgaria. She worked in this position for no more than a year and a half. Disappointed and oppressed by the way the presidency and the government work, on 6 July 1993 she left the vice-presidential post with an open letter. In an interview with a capital newspaper, she said: "The post of vice president gave me the opportunity to face people's characters, to understand what power is. You cannot imagine how a person changes in a certain environment. Even at home, I noticed such a change with horror." Dimitrova kept a long silence on political topics after her message.

== Poetry ==
Dimitrova published her first poems in the magazine Bulgarian Speech as a student in 1938, at only 16 years old. As the only child of parents: a lawyer and a teacher from Veliko Tarnovo moved to the capital so that their child could develop the intellectual capabilities that her father and mother believed in. Later, as a high school student at the First Girls' High School in the capital, under the skilled and caring guidance of her Bulgarian language and literature teacher Manya Miletich, Blaga Dimitrova began to publish in various newspapers and magazines. She would publish her first book, called ''Journey to Oneself'' in 1961.

After the suicide in Prague of Jan Palach and the invasion of Czechoslovakia, she wrote her poem Jan Palach, which she managed to smuggle to the dissidents in Prague. The Seventies marked the peak of her poetic production, with the publication of a number of books that re-awakened the Bulgarians' conscience. Along with her husband, the literary critic Jordan Vasiliev, in 1975 she published Bagrian's youth and Black days and white days, a sort of biography of the great Bulgarian poet Elisaveta Bagryana. Since the text mentions authors banned by the propaganda, the books were confiscated and the authors accused of "falsifying history". In 1981, after four years' attempts, she successfully published Face, a metaphor of the totalitarian regime and the void it provokes in people, in which she wrote:

"You don't know the secret for making a career for yourself? (...) you can only get on if you have a stain on your conscience! If you have a stain, then you are a man to be counted on. Of course, you will obey! (...) a stain is like a lift button. Someone presses it and up you go. But if you don't behave, they press it again and down you go. It's simply a question of knowing how to make the best use of your own stain!"

Despite the cuts made by the censors, the book was confiscated anyway, slammed by the critics, who accused the author of being on the payroll of a foreign power. The few remaining copies were transcribed on the typewriter and distributed underground throughout the country.

During the first free demonstration in Sofia, in November 1989, alongside the banners the crowd raised two books in the air: Fascism by Zelu Zelev and Face. In her book From here and beyond. Silhouettes of Friends (1992) wrote a detailed and respectful memory of his beloved teacher. She was noticed by the literary critic Vladimir Vasilev, who strongly invited the future poet to send poems to the Zlatorog magazine as well. She worked in the magazine "Septemvri" as an editor for eight years, after which she went to the Rhodopes for two years. She started working in "Narodna Kultura" as an editor and translator. Some of her most famous works are her first novel Journey to Self (1965), her novel Deviation (1967), which was filmed with the participation of actors Nevena Kokanova and Ivan Andonov, the travelogue novel The Last Judgment (1969), written after the little girl Ha Thu Hoang was taken from Haiphong Vietnam. The same year together with Alexander Milev translated from the ancient Greek "Iliad". Followed by the novel "Lavina" (1971) was filmed, the biographical book "The youth of Bagryana and her companions" (1975 co-authored with Yordan Vasilev), "Black and white days. Elisaveta Bagryana - observations and conversations" (1975 co-authored with Yordan Vasilev).

Along with the prose books, she had her most famous collections of poems: Until Tomorrow (1959), The World in a Hand (1962), Back in Time (1965), Doomed to Love (1967), Gong (1976), Night Diary (1976), Spaces" (1980), "Voice" (1985) and others. Translated "The Ring of Eternity" (1984) by the three poets: Ana Akhmatova, Gabriela Mistral and Edith Södergran, about whom the poet Fedya Filkova says: "The three women married with the "ring of eternity", as well as the collection of poems "Contemplating the World" (1998) on Polish Nobel Prize-winning poet Wisława Szymborska.

Blaga Dimitrova is the author of the script for the film "Deviation". Her play "An Unexpected Meeting" as well as "Dr. Faustina" were performed for years at Theater "199" and in provincial theater salons, and her works have been translated into 23 countries. Blaga Dimitrova left over 80 books, screenplays, essays, interviews, a rich treasury of representative of generations of female authors in Bulgarian literature. Undoubtedly, over the years, some of her work has been met with hostility by ideological censorship. Her novel "Lice" (1981) was confiscated from bookstores and sent to prison in Sliven, along with the book "Fascism" by Zh. Zhelev and "Hot Peppers" by Radoj Ralin. She also wrote an essay in 1989 called The Name during the Big Excursion, showing her disillusionment of the Assimilation process and supporting the return of Muslim names.

== Works ==
- Because the sea is black: poems of Blaga Dimitrova. Translated by Niko Boris; Heather McHugh. Wesleyan University Press. 1989.
- Because the sea is black. Translated by Ludmilla G. Popova-Wightman; Elizabeth A. Socolow. Ivy Press Princeton. June 2003. ISBN 1-930214-06-5.
- The last rock eagle: selected poems of Blaga Dimitrova. Translated by Brenda Walker; Vladimir Levchev; Belin Tonchev. Forest Books. 1992. ISBN 978-1-85610-009-0.
- Forbidden sea: a poem. Ivy Press. 2000. ISBN 978-1-930214-01-9.

"Cassandra with a Tail" poem

=== Anthologies ===
- Vasa D. Mihailovich, ed. (1977). "The Old Man and the World". White stones and fir trees: an anthology of contemporary Slavic literature. Fairleigh Dickinson University Press. ISBN 978-0-8386-1194-4.
- Walter M. Cummins, ed. (1993). "Almost a Prophecy; Night-light -- A Night-bird's Eye; The Great Wall; Amnesia in Reverse; Bee Lesson; The Shadow of the Trees; Overstepping One's Rights; Frost". Shifting borders: East European poetries of the eighties. Fairleigh Dickinson University Press. ISBN 978-0-8386-3497-4.

== Notes ==
Political offices
Preceded by Atanas Semerdzhiev	Vice President of Bulgaria; 22 January 1992 – 6 July 1993	Succeeded by Todor Kavaldzhiev
