= Stanko Todorov =

Prime Minister of Bulgaria (1920–1996)

- Станко Тодоров
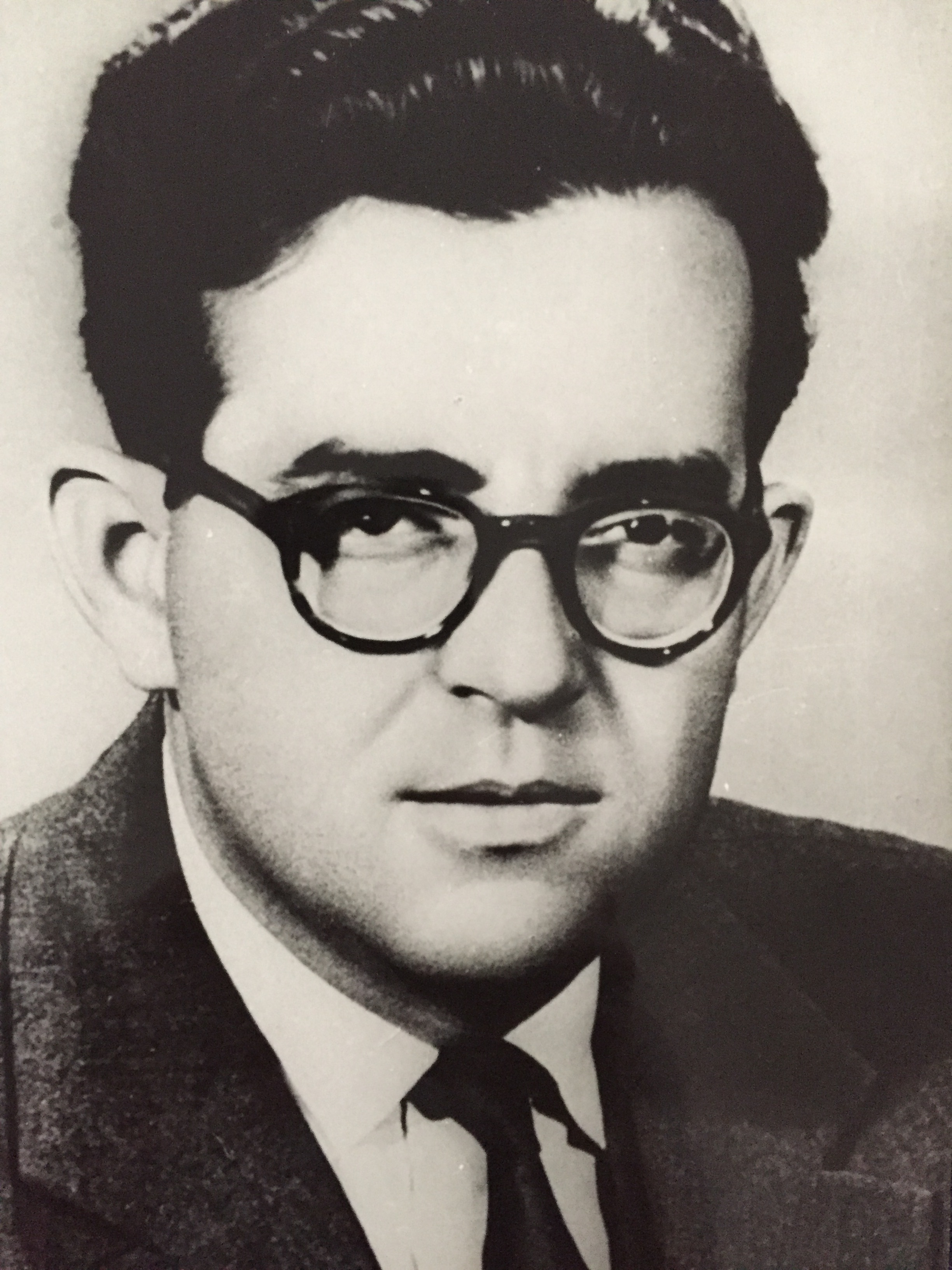

Chairman (President) of Bulgaria Acting
- In office 6 July 1990 – 17 July 1990
- Preceded by: Petar Mladenov
- Succeeded by: Nikolai Todorov (Acting)

Chairperson of the National Assembly
- In office 16 June 1981 – 17 July 1990
- Preceded by: Vladimir Bonev
- Succeeded by: Nikolai Todorov

37th Prime Minister of Bulgaria
- In office 7 July 1971 – 16 June 1981
- Preceded by: Todor Zhivkov
- Succeeded by: Grisha Filipov

Personal details
- Born: 10 December 1920 Klenovik, Kingdom of Bulgaria
- Died: 17 December 1996 (aged 76) Sofia, Bulgaria
- Party: Bulgarian Communist Party (1944–1990); Bulgarian Socialist Party (1990–1996)

Stanko Todorov Georgiev (Bulgarian: Станко Тодоров Георгиев; 10 December 1920 – 17 December 1996) was a Bulgarian communist politician.

Todorov was born in Pernik Province. Before and during World War II he was a worker. He became interested in communism, first joining the Workers Youth League in 1936 then joining the underground Bulgarian Communist Party in 1943. By 1948, communists had come to power in Bulgaria, and Todorov began to rise through the ranks of the government. He became a member of the politburo in 1961 and held several government posts. He served as Prime Minister of Bulgaria, the third highest post in the country, from July 7, 1971, until June 16, 1981. At 9 years and 344 days, he is the longest-serving Bulgarian prime minister. He then became chairman of the parliament, serving in that position until the first multiparty elections in 1990. He supported the reformist wing of the Communist Party during this time, as pressure mounted on Bulgaria and other eastern European countries to reform. He took part in the removal of long-time party leader Todor Zhivkov from office in 1989. Just before the 1990 elections, Todorov served as acting President of Bulgaria from July 6, 1990, to July 17, 1990. On this day, Nikolai Todorov was elected his successor als chairman of the National Assembly and also acting President.

He won a parliamentary seat in the 1990 elections, but resigned later that year for health reasons.

Political offices
| Preceded by Todor Zhivkov | Prime Minister of Bulgaria; 7 July 1971 – 16 June 1981 | Succeeded by Grisha Filipov |
