= Bulgarian Social Democratic Party =

Bulgarian political party

Bulgarian Social Democratic Party Българска социалдемократическа партия
- Founded: 26 November 1989
- Preceded by: BSDWP (BS)
- Headquarters: Sofia, Bulgaria
- Ideology: Social democracy
- Colours: Red

Website
- https://www.bsdp.bg

The Bulgarian Social Democratic Party (Bulgarian: Българска социалдемократическа партия, Balgarska Sotsialdemokraticheska Partiya, BSDP) is a social-democratic political party in Bulgaria.

== History ==
The party was launched on 26 November 1989 under the name Bulgarian Social Democratic Workers' Party (United), seeing itself as the historical successor to the Bulgarian Social Democratic Workers' Party of 1894. In January 1990 it adopted the name Bulgarian Social Democratic Party and in February Petar Dertliev was elected chairman. Subsequently, the party joined the Union of Democratic Forces (SDS). After a rift in the relations the BSDP left the Union and founded the "SDS-Centre" along with the movement Ekoglasnost. The coalition received 0.3% of the vote in the legislative elections in 1990 and 3.2% of the vote in the legislative elections in 1991 and failed to enter the National Assembly. Until 1994 BSDP participated in the coalition "Democratic Alternative for the Republic", which also failed to overcome the 4% threshold in the elections in the 1994 election. Since 1995 a process of returning to the SDS began and so the party contested the next elections in 1994 within the United Democratic Forces.

Since autumn 1997 a part of the leadership seek a rapprochement with other social-democratic parties in Bulgaria. In March 1998 the Movement for Social Humanism separated from the party. An extraordinary party congress at the end of 1998 caused another split. The left-wing, led by Dertlijev, pursued an alliance with the centre-left Coalition for Bulgaria and in 2002 it changed its name to Party of Bulgarian Social Democrats, while the right-wing continued to hold ties with the United Democratic Forces. Thus, the party was later part of the Blue Coalition, an alliance led by the SDS, in the 2009 legislative election. More recently, in the 2021 legislative election the BSDP was part of the alliance Patriotic Coalition formed around Volya and the National Front for the Salvation of Bulgaria.

== List of chairmen ==
- Atanas Moskov — 1989–1990
- Petar Dertliev — 1990–1998
- Peter Agov — 1998–2001
- Georgi Anastasov — 2001–unknown
- Aleksandra Hristova – 2016–today
