= April 1990 Bulgarian presidential election =

3 April 1990	Jul–Aug 1990 →
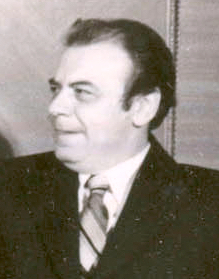
Nominee	Petar Mladenov
Party	BSP
Electoral vote	400
Percentage	100%
President before election
Petar Mladenov
BCP
Elected President
Petar Mladenov
BSP

Indirect presidential elections were held in Bulgaria on 3 April 1990 following the abolition of the State Council, the collective presidency of the Communist era. Members of the National Assembly elected a new president, with Petar Mladenov, former chair of the State Council, being elected unanimously.

== Background ==
On 3 April 1990 the 9th National Assembly passed the Law on Amending the Constitution of the People's Republic of Bulgaria, which abolished the State Council, the collective presidency of the Communist era. The State Council was replaced by the posts of Chairman (President) and Deputy Chairman (Vice-President) of the Republic.

According to Article 91, paragraph 1, the President was to be elected by the National Assembly by a majority of two-thirds of those present, and would hold office for the duration of the Assembly (which had a five-year term). Any Bulgarian citizen who was at least 40 years old and eligible to be elected to parliament was eligible to stand for President. The Vice President of the Republic was elected by the National Assembly at the proposal of the President by a simple majority of those present. (Art. 94, para. 1) His term ran concurrently with that of the President.

The President and Vice President were limited to two terms. However, their terms could be terminated early by the National Assembly if at least one-third of MPs considered they had violated the Constitution or oath. Their terms would be terminated if two-thirds of MPs voted in favour. The National Assembly would then have one month to elect a new president.

== Results ==
The parliamentary group of the Communist Party and the Agrarian Union nominated Petar Mladenov, who was elected unanimously. Immediately after the election he was sworn in and officially assumed office.

== Aftermath ==
Mladenov resigned in July 1990, resulting in fresh elections in July and August.
