= Vice President of Bulgaria =

Second-highest office in Bulgaria

Vice President of the Republic of Bulgaria
- Вицепрезидент на България (Bulgarian); Viceprezident na Bǎlgarija (Bulgarian Latin)
- Lesser Coat of Arms of Bulgaria
- Incumbent; Vacant since 23 January 2026
- Style: Excellency
- Residence: Bojana Residence, Sofia
- Term length: Five years, renewable once
- Constituting instrument: Constitution of Bulgaria
- Formation: 1 August 1990
- First holder: Atanas Semerdžiev

The vice president of the Republic of Bulgaria is the principal assistant to the president of Bulgaria and the first in the line of succession to the presidency. It is the only active vice presidential office in the European Union (EU). (Note: Another EU member state, Cyprus, also has a post of Vice President, although since 1974 that post has remained vacant.)

The vice president is elected by popular vote every five years alongside the president. The most recent election took place in 2021. The office has been vacant since 23 January 2026, when Iliana Iotova succeeded to the presidency upon the resignation of Rumen Radev.

== Role ==
The primary role of the vice president is to assume the duties of the president in case of the president's death, resignation, removal from office or other incapacity. The vice president is also tasked with assisting the president in exercising official functions. The Constitution explicitly allows the president to delegate several functions including: the appointment and removal of state officials, grant and remove Bulgarian citizenship and asylum, and exercise clemency.

== List of vice presidents (1990–present) ==
=== Elected by parliament, 1990–1992 ===
The following vice presidents were elected by the parliament.

Vice Chairman (Vice President)		Term of office			Political party	Chairman (President)
Portrait	Name (Born–Died)	Took office	Left office	Duration	Political party	Chairman (President)
	Atanas Semerdzhiev; Атанас Семерджиев (1924–2015)	1 August 1990	22 January 1992	1 year, 174 days	Bulgarian Socialist Party	Zhelyu Zhelev

=== Directly elected, 1992–present ===
The following vice-presidents were elected by the people.

Vice President		Term of office			Political party	President
Portrait	Name (Born–Died)	Took office	Left office	Duration	Political party	President
	Blaga Dimitrova; Блага Димитрова (1922–2003)	22 January 1992	6 July 1993 (resigned)	1 year, 165 days	Union of Democratic Forces	Zhelyu Zhelev
Vacant		6 July 1993	22 January 1997	3 years, 200 days	Vacant	Zhelyu Zhelev
	Todor Kavaldzhiev; Тодор Кавалджиев (1934–2019)	22 January 1997	22 January 2002	5 years, 0 days	United Democratic Forces	Petar Stoyanov
	Angel Marin; Ангел Марин (1942–2024)	22 January 2002	22 January 2012	10 years, 0 days	Bulgarian Socialist Party	Georgi Parvanov
	Margarita Popova; Маргарита Попова (born 1956)	22 January 2012	22 January 2017	5 years, 0 days	Independent / GERB	Rosen Plevneliev
	Iliana Iotova; Илиана Йотова (born 1964)	22 January 2017	23 January 2026	9 years, 1 day	Bulgarian Socialist Party	Rumen Radev
Vacant		23 January 2026	Incumbent	294 days	Vacant	Iliana Iotova
	Kiril Valchev; Кирил Вълчев (born 1973)	Assuming office 22 January 2027	Elect	−70 days	Bulgarian Socialist Party	Iliana Iotova

== See also ==
- History of Bulgaria
- Politics of Bulgaria
- List of first deputy chairmen of the State Council of Bulgaria
- List of heads of state of Bulgaria
- List of current vice presidents and designated acting presidents
