= Alternative Socialist Alliance – Independents =

ASO(N) logo

Alternative Socialist Alliance – Independents (Bulgarian: Алтернативно социалистическо обединение (независими), abbreviated ASO(N)) is a political party in Bulgaria, which emerged from a minority fraction of the Bulgarian Communist Party. The party was first registered as a political party in 1991.

In 1996, under the name Alternative Socialist Alliance it launched its party president Lyubomir Stefanov as a presidential candidate. Stefanov got 6,056 votes (0.14%).

In 1998 the party joined the Bulgarian Euro-Left. In 2001 it was reconstructed as an independent party, and registered with the current name. The party did not put up any own lists for the 2001 elections.
