= Zhivkov Constitution =

Zhivkov Constitution Живковска Конституция

Overview
- Original title: Живковска конституция
- Jurisdiction: Bulgaria
- Date effective: 18 May 1971
- Repealed: 12 July 1991
- Author: 5th National Assembly
- Supersedes: Dimitrov Constitution
- Superseded by: Constitution of the Republic of Bulgaria

The Zhivkov Constitution (Bulgarian: Живковска Конституция) was a communist state constitution and the third Constitution of Bulgaria overall. It was in effect from May 18, 1971 to July 12, 1991.

The Bulgarian Communist Party, under the leadership of general secretary Todor Zhivkov, used the outbreak of the Prague Spring as a pretext to tighten control over all social organizations and heavily re-emphasize "democratic centralism" within the party. Zhivkov and his colleagues were determined to reassure the Soviets that there would not be a Bulgarian version of the Prague Spring. A major result of the events of 1968 was the decision to replace the Dimitrov Constitution of 1947.

The proposed changes were discussed and approved by a commission chaired by Zhivkov. After receiving the assent of the Tenth Party Congress, it was approved via a national referendum held in May 1971. The document detailed for the first time the structure of the BCP (highly centralized, in keeping with policy after 1968) and its role in leading both society and state. The Bulgarian Agrarian National Union (BANU) was specified as the partner of the BCP in the cooperative governing of the country.

A new State Council was created to oversee the Council of Ministers and exercise supreme executive authority. In 1971, Zhivkov, prime minister since 1962, resigned to become chairman of the State Council.

The 1971 constitution defined Bulgaria as a socialist state with membership in the international socialist community. Like its predecessor, it granted broad citizens' rights, but these rights were limited by the requirement that they be exercised only in the interest of the state. Citizens' obligations included working according to one's ability to build the foundation of the socialist state and defend the state, compulsory military service, and paying taxes. The new constitution also defined four forms of property: state, cooperative, public organization, and private. Private property was limited to that needed for individual and family upkeep.

Most of the governmental structure specified in the Dimitrov Constitution remained, but the State Council replaced the Presidium as the supreme organ of state power. This council consisted of a chairman--a post equivalent to that of president--and 22 members. The State Council was more powerful than the Presidium because it could initiate as well as approve legislation, and because it exercised some of the non-governmental supervision normally delegated to ruling parties in East European communist states of that period. Council members, nominally elected by the National Assembly, were members of the Bulgarian Communist Party or other mass organizations.

The National Assembly, traditional center of political power in Bulgaria until the 1947 constitution stripped it of power, was defined as the highest organ of state power, with the State Council officially defined as an executive committee of the Assembly. It nominally received greater responsibilities than it had possessed in the 1947 document. Permanent commissions were to supervise the work of ministries, and legislation could now be submitted by labor and youth groups (all of which were party-controlled). In practice, the National Assembly only met for three brief sessions per year, during which it merely rubber-stamped legislation and BCP nominations for the State Council, Supreme Court, and Council of Ministers. When the National Assembly was not in session, the State Council had the power to issue decrees without even the theoretical requirement of submitting them to the National Assembly for approval at its next session. In most other Communist regimes, the legislature at least theoretically had the power of veto in such circumstances, though it was almost never exercised in practice. As such, the State Council had the effective power to pass laws whenever it desired, instead of needing nominal legislative approval for its decrees to remain effective after the end of the subsequent meeting of the legislature.

Zhivkov was forced to resign on November 10, 1989. A month later, his successor, Petar Mladenov, called for the BCP to give up its monopoly of power. This was formally done on January 15, 1990; when the National Assembly struck out Article 1, which enshrined the BCP's "leading role" in the state. In April, the State Council was abolished and replaced by the post of president of the republic.

Participants in national round table discussions eventually agreed on the need for a completely new constitution, which took effect on July 12, 1991.
