= 1971 Bulgarian constitutional referendum =

16 May 1971

Results
Choice	Votes	%
Yes	6,135,218	99.75%
No	15,477	0.25%
Valid votes	6,150,695	99.91%
Invalid or blank votes	5,533	0.09%
Total votes	6,156,228	100.00%

A constitutional referendum was held in Bulgaria on 16 May 1971. Voters were asked whether they approved of a new constitution (known as the Zhivkov Constitution). The new constitution defined Bulgaria as a "socialist state of the working people from the cities and the villages", led by the Bulgarian Communist Party in cooperation with the Bulgarian Agrarian National Union. The result was reportedly 99.7% in favour, with a voter turnout of 99.7%.

== Results ==
Choice	Votes	%
For	6,135,218	99.7
Against	15,477	0.3
Invalid/blank votes	5,533	–
Total	6,156,228	100
Registered voters/turnout	6,174,635	99.7
Source: Nohlen & Stöver
