= Dimitar Iliev Popov =

Bulgarian politician (1927–2015)

Dimitar Popov
- Димитър Попов
- Popov in 1991

41st Prime Minister of Bulgaria
- In office 7 December 1990 – 8 November 1991
- President: Zhelyu Zhelev
- Preceded by: Andrey Lukanov
- Succeeded by: Philip Dimitrov

Personal details
- Born: 26 June 1927 Kula, Kingdom of Bulgaria
- Died: 5 December 2015 (aged 88) Sofia, Bulgaria
- Party: Independent

Dimitar Iliev Popov (Pokriva) (Bulgarian: Димитър Илиев Попов [diˈmitɐr poˈpɔf]; 26 June 1927 – 5 December 2015) was a leading Bulgarian judge and the first prime minister of the country not to be a member of the Bulgarian Communist Party since 1946. He was also the first prime minister since 1944 who was not a Communist or a fellow traveler.

Popov, who did not have any party affiliation and was chosen for his perceived impartiality as a member of the judiciary, was selected to head the new government after the resignation of Andrey Lukanov in December 1990 in the face of mass demonstrations and a general strike. As prime minister, Popov oversaw the drafting of the new constitution as well as the second open elections. Although overseeing the beginnings of the policy of privatization, Popov's government was more of a caretaker administration.

Popov died at the age of 88 on December 5, 2015.

Political offices
Preceded by Andrey Lukanov	Prime Minister of Bulgaria; 1990–1991	Succeeded by Philip Dimitrov
