= Andrey Lukanov =

Bulgarian politician (1938–1996)

- Андрей Луканов
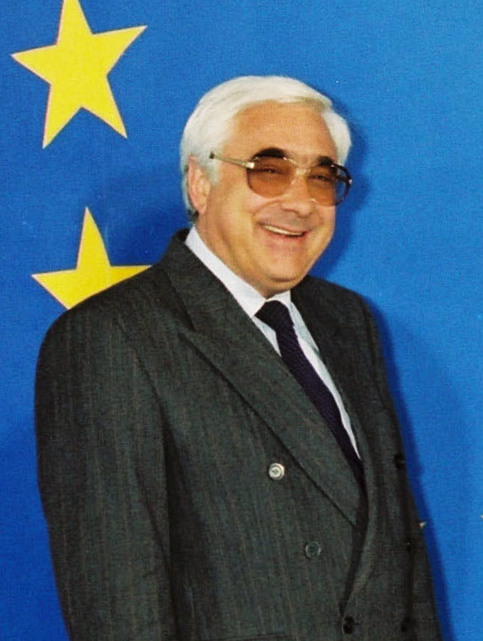
- Lukanov in 1990

40th Prime Minister of Bulgaria
- In office 3 February 1990 – 7 December 1990
- President: Petar Mladenov; Zhelyu Zhelev
- Preceded by: Georgi Atanasov
- Succeeded by: Dimitar Popov

Personal details
- Born: Andrey Karlov Lukanov; 26 September 1938 Moscow, Russian SFSR, Soviet Union
- Died: 2 October 1996 (aged 58) Sofia, Bulgaria
- Cause of death: Assassination
- Party: Bulgarian Socialist Party (1990–1996); Bulgarian Communist Party (1963–1990)

Andrey Karlov Lukanov (Bulgarian: Андрей Карлов Луканов [ɐnˈdrɛj ɫuˈkanof]; 26 September 1938 – 2 October 1996) was a Bulgarian politician. Between February and November 1990, Lukanov was the final Prime Minister of the People's Republic of Bulgaria. He was assassinated in 1996.

== Biography ==
=== Early life ===
Andrey Karlov Lukanov was born on September 26, 1938 in Moscow, USSR, in the family of Karlo Lukanov, (1897–1982), a Bulgarian communist émigré. Lukanov's family moved back to Bulgaria after the communist takeover of 1944 when Lukanov was only 6 years old. His father became an important figure in the party and served as foreign minister of Bulgaria from 1956 to 1961.

=== Political career ===
Andrey became a member of the party in 1963 and began a career in the foreign service. He helped represent Bulgaria in the United Nations and Comecon. He rose through the ranks of the foreign service to become minister of foreign economic affairs in 1987, resigning in 1989. Lukanov became a leading member of the reformist wing of the BCP, and took part in the overthrow of longtime leader Todor Zhivkov. He became prime minister on 3 February 1990. This office he held until 7 December 1990. Midway through his tenure, the Communist Party rebranded itself as the Bulgarian Socialist Party.

Lukanov oversaw the first democratic election which had taken place in Bulgaria since 1931. This election took place in June; the BSP remained the largest party in the national legislature, and Lukanov himself continued in government.

Seeking a stable majority, Lukanov offered to form a coalition with the opposition, but his offers were rebuffed. The opposition argued that the former Communist Party must shoulder responsibility for past political crimes and the rapidly deteriorating economy. Lukanov's months in office were marked by corruption, huge consumer goods deficit, and civil unrest. Finally in December, after large demonstrations and a general strike, Lukanov resigned, allowing a technocratic government to be formed by Dimitar Popov.

Lukanov was charged with embezzlement in 1992 and arrested, but charges were soon dropped. During his time in the foreign service, Lukanov had gained connections with western businessmen such as Robert Maxwell and engaged in controversial business dealings.

== Death ==
Lukanov was assassinated on 2 October 1996 оutside the Sofia apartment where he lived. He was shot in the head and chest by a lone gunman who fled and was never captured.

=== Trial ===
A building contractor named Angel Vassilev, who had been close to the incumbent BSP government led by Zhan Videnov, was arrested and charged (alongside various others) with having organized Lukanov's murder. After a long trial and an initial guilty verdict, the Bulgarian Court of Appeal declared Vassilev and the other defendants to be innocent.

Public rumors to the effect that Lukanov would be slain had been in existence for months before the killing was carried out. To this day, the true perpetrators of the assassination remain unknown.

== See also ==
- List of unsolved murders

Political offices
Preceded by Georgi Atanasov	Prime Minister of Bulgaria; 1990	Succeeded by Dimitar Popov
