= Petar Mladenov =

Final leader of Communist Bulgaria (1989–90); first President of Bulgaria (1990)

- Петър Младенов
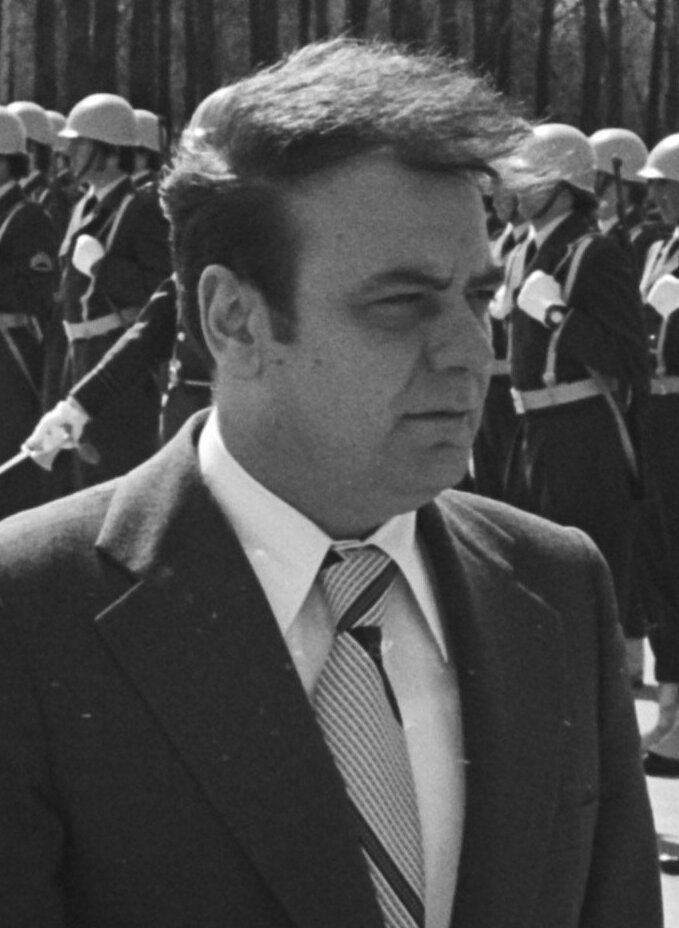
- Mladenov in 1976

Chairman (President) of Bulgaria
- In office 3 April 1990 – 6 July 1990
- Prime Minister: Andrey Lukanov
- Preceded by: Himself as Chairman of the State Council
- Succeeded by: Stanko Todorov (Acting)

Chairman of the State Council of Bulgaria
- In office 17 November 1989 – 3 April 1990
- Preceded by: Todor Zhivkov
- Succeeded by: Himself as President

General Secretary of the Central Committee of the Bulgarian Communist Party
- In office 10 November 1989 – 2 February 1990
- Preceded by: Todor Zhivkov
- Succeeded by: Aleksandar Lilov (as the Chairman of the Bulgarian Communist Party)

Foreign Minister of Bulgaria
- In office 13 December 1971 – 24 October 1989
- President: Todor Zhivkov
- Preceded by: Ivan Hristov Bashev
- Succeeded by: Boiko Dimitrov

Personal details
- Born: 22 August 1936 Toshevtsi, Vidin Province, Kingdom of Bulgaria
- Died: 31 May 2000 (aged 63) Sofia, Bulgaria
- Party: BCP (1963–1990); BSP (1990–2000)
- Spouse: Galia Mladenova
- Children: Tatyana
- De facto leader of the PRB: ← Zhivkov; (Last in role) →

Petar Toshev Mladenov (Bulgarian: Петър Тошев Младенов; 22 August 1936 – 31 May 2000) was a Bulgarian communist diplomat and politician. He was the last leader of the Bulgarian People's Republic from 1989 to 1990, and briefly the first President of the Bulgarian Republic in 1990.

== Early life and education ==
Mladenov was born to a peasant family in the village of Toshevtsi, Vidin Province on 22 August 1936. His father was an anti-fascist partisan killed in action in 1944.

== Career ==
Mladenov served as the first secretary of the party's committee in Vidin Province from 1969 to 1971. He joined the Politburo and became foreign minister in 1971, serving in that position for 18 years. In the same year, he was elected to the National Assembly. He was one of the closest associates to longtime leader Todor Zhivkov.

=== Role in Zhivkov's overthrow ===
During the 1980s, he became attracted to Mikhail Gorbachev's reform efforts. He saw a chance to change Bulgaria's image as one of the most unreformed countries in the Eastern Bloc. In May 1989, Zhivkov ordered the expulsion of most of Bulgaria's ethnic Turks. This brought near-unanimous international condemnation. Mladenov, who had had to field most of the international complaints, was particularly upset because the expulsion violated an international human rights accord he had signed four months earlier.

Several other top officials, including Defense Minister Dobri Dzhurov, Premier Georgi Atanasov, and Finance Minister Andrey Lukanov, were also upset with Zhivkov over the expulsion. Along with Mladenov, they began plotting to overthrow Zhivkov. Although Lukanov did most of the organizational work, it was decided that Mladenov would be the new party leader. At the yearly Warsaw Pact summit, he met with Mikhail Gorbachev and got his tacit support for removing Zhivkov.

In October 1989, Mladenov organized a 35-nation environmental conference and invited the Bulgarian NGO Ecoglasnost to participate. Ten days into the conference, several Ecoglasnost members were beaten up by the Darzhavna Sigurnost (secret police) and the militia on orders from Zhivkov. When Mladenov found out about it, he decided Zhivkov had to go.

On 24 October, Mladenov resigned as foreign minister. His resignation letter was a scathing condemnation of Zhivkov's way of ruling the country. Suspecting that Zhivkov might try to kill him, he sent a copy of the letter to the entire Politburo, as well as to Gorbachev. On 9 November, just after he returned from a trip to China, Mladenov and his colleagues persuaded Zhivkov to resign (under threat of execution), which he did the next day. Mladenov was then elected to Zhivkov's old posts as general secretary of the party and chairman of the State Council. The latter post was equivalent to that of president.

Having seen the overthrow of the other Eastern Bloc governments, Mladenov embarked on a much more open government policy in hopes of bringing about change from above. In his first address to the Central Committee as the country's leader, he stated that there was "no alternative to restructuring" both the economy and the political climate, which in their previous forms had "handicapped progress in our society in all spheres". He also stated his commitment to making Bulgaria "a modern, democratic, and lawful country". To that end, he let it be known that he supported free elections, a greater role for the legislature and other reforms.

Despite Mladenov's promises of reforms, the people took to the streets almost every day to demand greater freedom. Bowing to the inevitable, on 11 December Mladenov announced in a nationally televised speech to party leaders that the Communist Party had to give up its guaranteed right to rule. The BCP's position in the state, he said, could no longer be "declared administratively", but instead had to be earned "from the trust of the people". To that end, Mladenov declared that the BCP had to "adopt the principle of a multiparty system". He also called for multiparty elections by the spring of 1990. Three days later, on 14 December—the same day that Zhivkov was expelled from the party—the BCP's Central Committee asked the National Assembly to delete the provisions of the Zhivkov Constitution that enshrined its leading role. The Central Committee also endorsed early elections in the spring. Those elections were held in June 1990.

=== Transition to Democracy ===
The final legal step in ending Communist rule in Bulgaria came on 2 January 1990; when the National Assembly amended the constitution to remove Article 1, which enshrined the Communist Party's leading role. However, for all intents and purposes, Communist rule had ended a month earlier when the Central Committee formally renounced its guaranteed right to rule.

On 2 February, in an effort to change the party's image ahead of the upcoming elections, the office of general secretary was replaced by the office of party chairman. Mladenov stood down as party leader, and Alexander Lilov was chosen to take the new office. Mladenov's resignation as party leader removed the stigma of party interference in government. On 3 April the State Council was abolished and replaced by an executive presidency. Mladenov was elected as the first holder of this post by the National Assembly.

In April 1990, the Communist Party reorganized itself as a Western-style social democratic party, the Bulgarian Socialist Party.

Mladenov resigned as President in July 1990 after allegedly suggesting the use of tanks against anti-government demonstration in December 1989, securing a place in history with the phrase 'The tanks had better come' (Bulgarian: По-добре танковете да дойдат). He did not run in the 1990 elections and largely retired from public life.

== Death ==
Mladenov underwent a heart bypass in Houston in 1986, leaving him in frail health in the ensuing years. He died on 31 May 2000 in Sofia.

Political offices
Preceded by Todor Zhivkov	Chairman of the State Council of Bulgaria; 17 November 1989 – 3 April 1990	Succeeded by Himself as President
Preceded by Himself as Chairman of the State Council	President of Bulgaria; 3 April 1990 – 6 July 1990	Succeeded by Zhelyu Zhelev
Preceded by Ivan Hristov Bashev	Foreign Minister of Bulgaria; 13 December 1971 – 17 November 1989	Succeeded by Boyko Dimitrov
