= Dimitrov Constitution =

Constitution of Bulgaria from 1947 to 1971

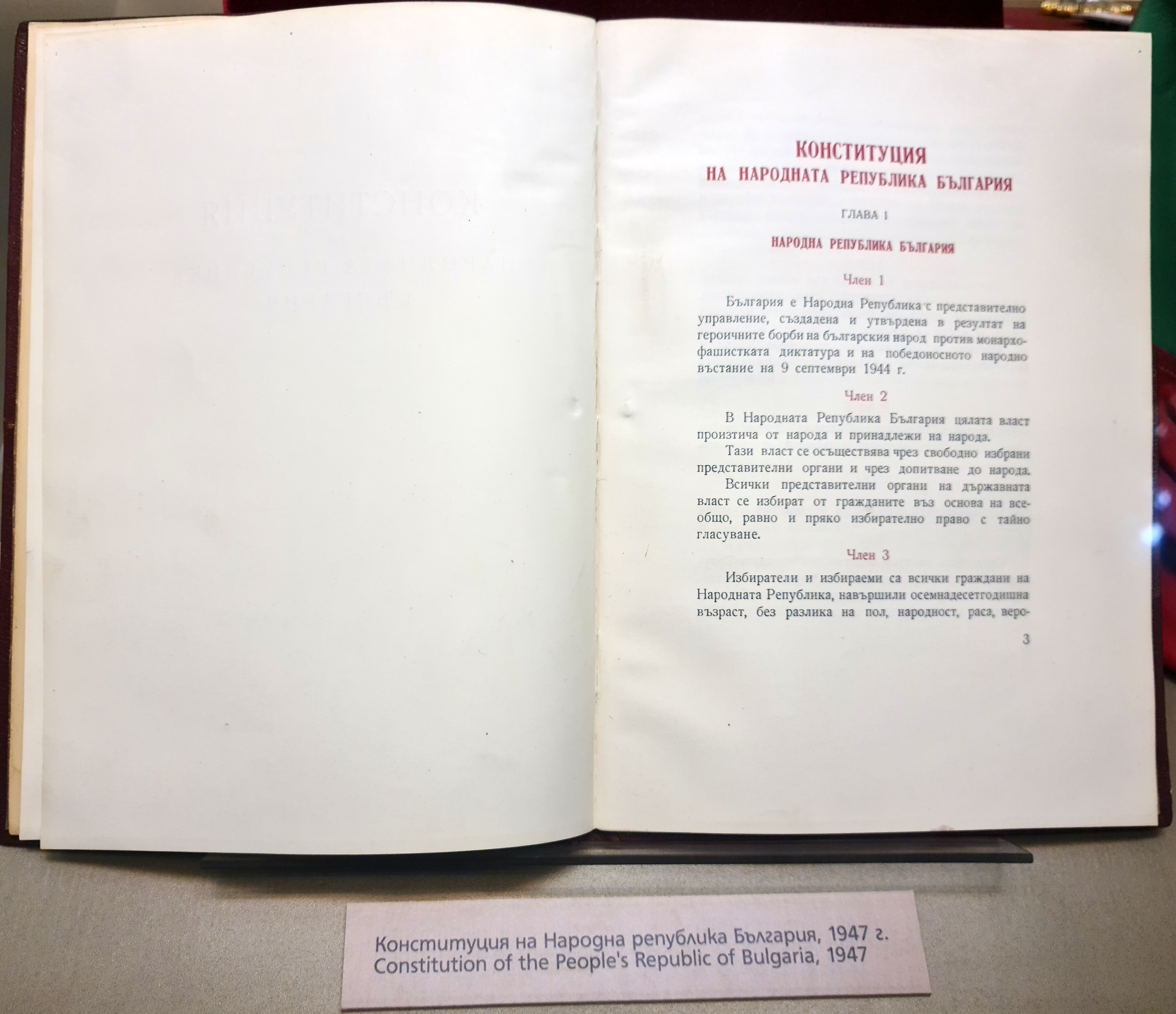

Overview
- Original title: Димитровска конституция
- Jurisdiction: Bulgaria
- Ratified: 4 December 1947
- Date effective: 6 December 1947
- Repealed: 18 May 1971
- Location: National Historical Museum
- Author: 6th Grand National Assembly
- Supersedes: Tarnovo Constitution
- Superseded by: Zhivkov Constitution

The Dimitrov Constitution was a communist state constitution. It was the second Constitution of Bulgaria, and was in effect from 1947 to 1971. It formed the legal basis for Communist rule in Bulgaria.

The document was named after the country's first Communist leader, Georgi Dimitrov. He guided the framing of the 1947 constitution on the model of the 1936 Soviet Constitution. The Dimitrov Constitution guaranteed citizens all manner of personal freedoms, such as equality before the law, freedom from discrimination, freedom of speech, press, and assembly, and inviolability of person, domicile, and correspondence. However, these rights were effectively rendered meaningless by a clause prohibiting activity that would jeopardize the attainments of "the national revolution of 9 September 1944." Citizens were guaranteed employment but required to work in a socially useful capacity. The constitution also prescribed a planned national economy, and provided for a national welfare system. Unlike the Soviet Constitution, private property was allowed, provided that it was not used "to the detriment of the public good."

The constitution set up a highly centralized governmental structure. The legislature, the National Assembly, was defined as the "highest organ of state power." It was elected for a four-year term and met in regular session twice a year. In practice, it did little more than rubber-stamp decisions already made at the highest levels of the Bulgarian Communist Party When the National Assembly was not in session, its powers were exercised by a Presidium comprising a president (a post equivalent to that of president of the republic) and 18 members. The Presidium also had the power to declare war, make peace, amend the constitution, and approve the national economic plan.

Executive authority was vested in a Council of Ministers appointed by the Presidium. Its chairman, the prime minister, was almost always the leader of the Communist Party. The judiciary was appointed by the National Assembly at all levels and lost all independence. Local government was exercised by people's councils, who elected executive committees responsible to the Presidium.

The constitution remained in effect until 1971, when it was replaced by the Zhivkov Constitution.
