= Nikolai Todorov =

Bulgarian historian and President of Bulgaria

- Николай Тодоров
- Todorov in 1972

Chairperson of the National Assembly
- In office 17 July 1990 – 2 October 1991
- Preceded by: Stanko Todorov
- Succeeded by: Stefan Savov

Chairman (President) of Bulgaria Acting
- In office 17 July 1990 – 1 August 1990
- Preceded by: Stanko Todorov (Acting)
- Succeeded by: Zhelyu Zhelev

Personal details
- Born: 6 June 1921 Varna, Kingdom of Bulgaria
- Died: 27 August 2003 (aged 82) Sofia, Bulgaria
- Party: Independent
- Other political affiliations: Communist Party (before 1990)
- Children: 3, including Maria
- Education: Sofia University

Nikolai Todorov Todorov (Bulgarian: Николай Тодоров Тодоров; 6 June 1921 – 27 August 2003) was a Bulgarian historian. In 1990, he briefly served as acting president of Bulgaria.

== Life and career ==
Todorov was born in Varna and, as he noted himself, he was of Greek descent. Todorov was inspired to go into politics after the trial of Traycho Kostov, whom he had shared a prison cell with during World War II. After a distinguished academic career, which included a position at the National and Kapodistrian University of Athens, he joined the Bulgarian Ministry of Foreign Affairs. He would later serve as the Bulgarian representative to UNESCO and the Bulgarian Ambassador to Greece (1978–1983). Following Bulgaria's departure from Communism, Todorov became Speaker of the National Assembly of Bulgaria, leading him to serve as acting president.

== Personal life ==
Todorov was married with three children. He is the father of Maria Todorova, the author of Imagining the Balkans (1997).
