= Petar Dertliev =

Bulgarian politician (1916–2000)

Peter Dertliev Петър Антонов Дертлиев
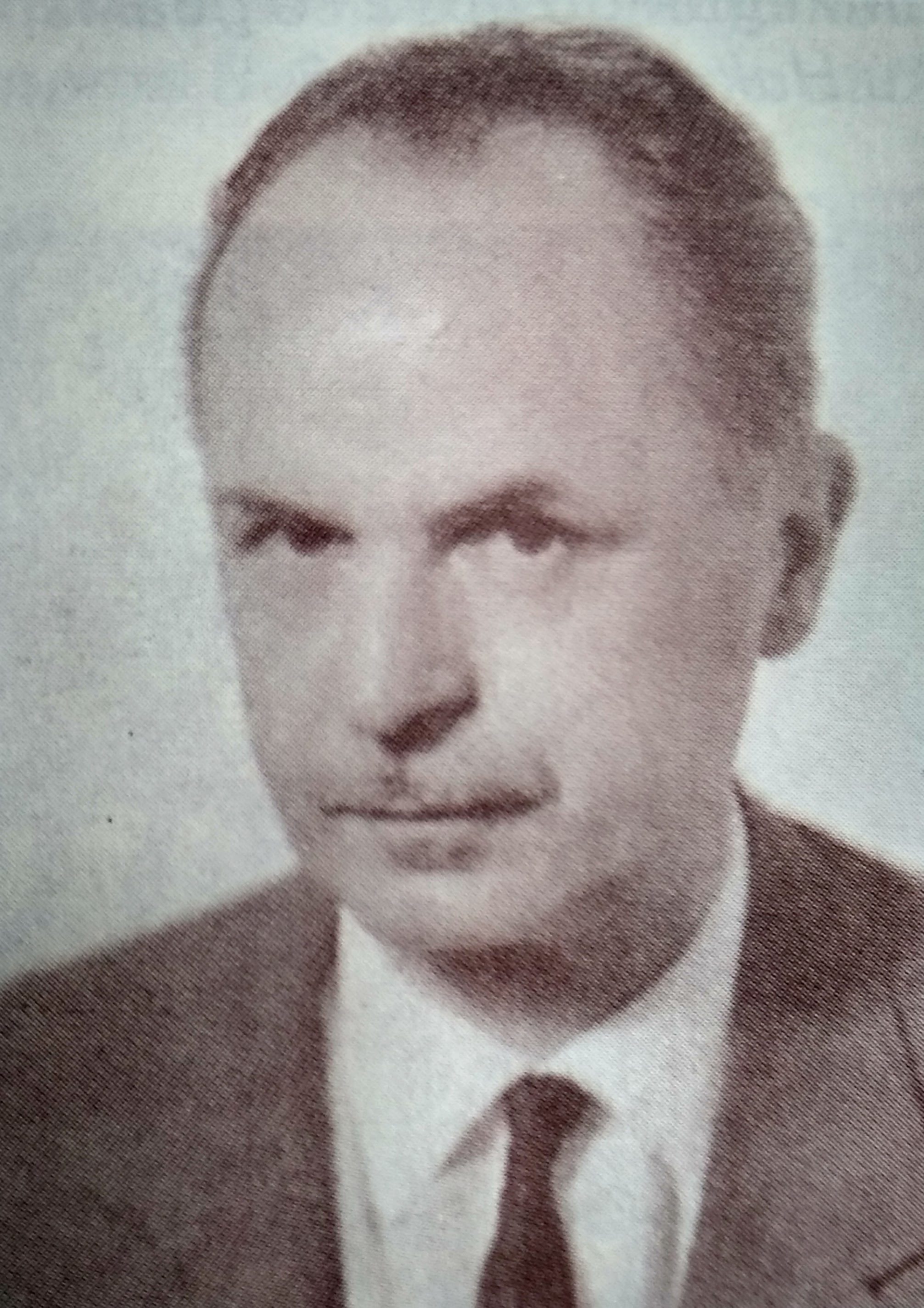
- Image of Petar Dertliev

Personal details
- Born: Peter Antonov Dertliev; 7 April 1916 Pisarovo, Pleven, Bulgaria
- Died: 5 November 2000 (aged 84) Sofia, Bulgaria
- Party: Fatherland Front (1944–1948) Independent (1948–1989) Party of Bulgarian Social Democrats (1989–2000)
- Education: Sofia University
- Profession: Doctor, politician

Petar Antonov Dertliev (Bulgarian: Петър Дертлиев; 7 April 1916 – 5 November 2000) was a Bulgarian Social Democrat politician.

== Early life ==
Dertliev was in Pisarovo, Pleven Province. He was educated as a doctor, and graduated in medicine in 1941. He was briefly an assistant in the Department of Anatomy at the Medical Faculty of Sofia University.

== Career ==
His career was marked by political persecution exercised against him. From 1957 to 1963, he worked in the TB-dispensary for children in Tryavna and Pernik. From then until his retirement in 1984 he was head of the fluorographic department of the Institute of Tuberculosis at the Medical College.

Dertliev was, in his own words, more of a "social democrat than a teenager". He participated in strikes and held political stands. He was first arrested in 1936 during a student protest for restoration of the Tarnovo Constitution. He was repeatedly arrested for opposition activities against the regime established after 1934. In 1938 he came under investigation for illegally printing and distributing materials during elections.

On 9 September 1944, he became a member of the Committee of the Fatherland Front at Sofia University and the Medical Faculty. He was a secretary of the Union of Socialist Youth.

In 1946, he was sent to Camp "Rosica" for opposition activities against the regime. That same year he was elected to parliament in the National Assembly of Bulgaria. In 1948, his parliamentary immunity was revoked and Dertliev was sentenced to ten years in prison "for counter-revolutionary activities". He was imprisoned in Venchan and Belene (2-fold), Pleven Prison, criminal division and in jail for repeat offenders in Pazardzhik.

=== Post-liberation ===
After the political changes of 1989, Dertliev, together with Atanas Moskov, initiated the reconstruction of the Party of Bulgarian Social Democrats (BSDP). After the Moskov's brief presidency (1989–1990), in 1990 Dertliev became chair of BSDP.

In the Bulgarian presidential election, July–August 1990, he attempted to become a presidential candidate, but Bulgarian Socialist Party BSP did not accept the nomination on the ground that he was ultimately anti-communist. Although Dertliev signed the new Constitution he disagreed with the position of the 39 MPs and left the parliament.

He left BSDP and UDF in 1991 and tried to create a political center, an alternative to BSP and UDF. He attempted to attract former members of BSP / SDK from "Europe". He tried to form a strong social-democratic core around which to unite the political center. He largely achieved this with the establishment of the Council for Cooperation with the participation of the Alternative Social Liberal Party, Civil Alliance for the Republic, the Green Party, PK Ecoglastnost and others. In 1994 he was the first chairman of the rotation of Political Union Democratic Alternative for the Republic (DAR).

Dertliev wrote two autobiographical books, one of which is This is me – speeches, articles and interviews.

He retired from active political activity in 1998, remaining honorary chairman of BSDP. Despite poor health, he continued to deal with political problems. He died of cancer on 5 November 2000 in Sofia.

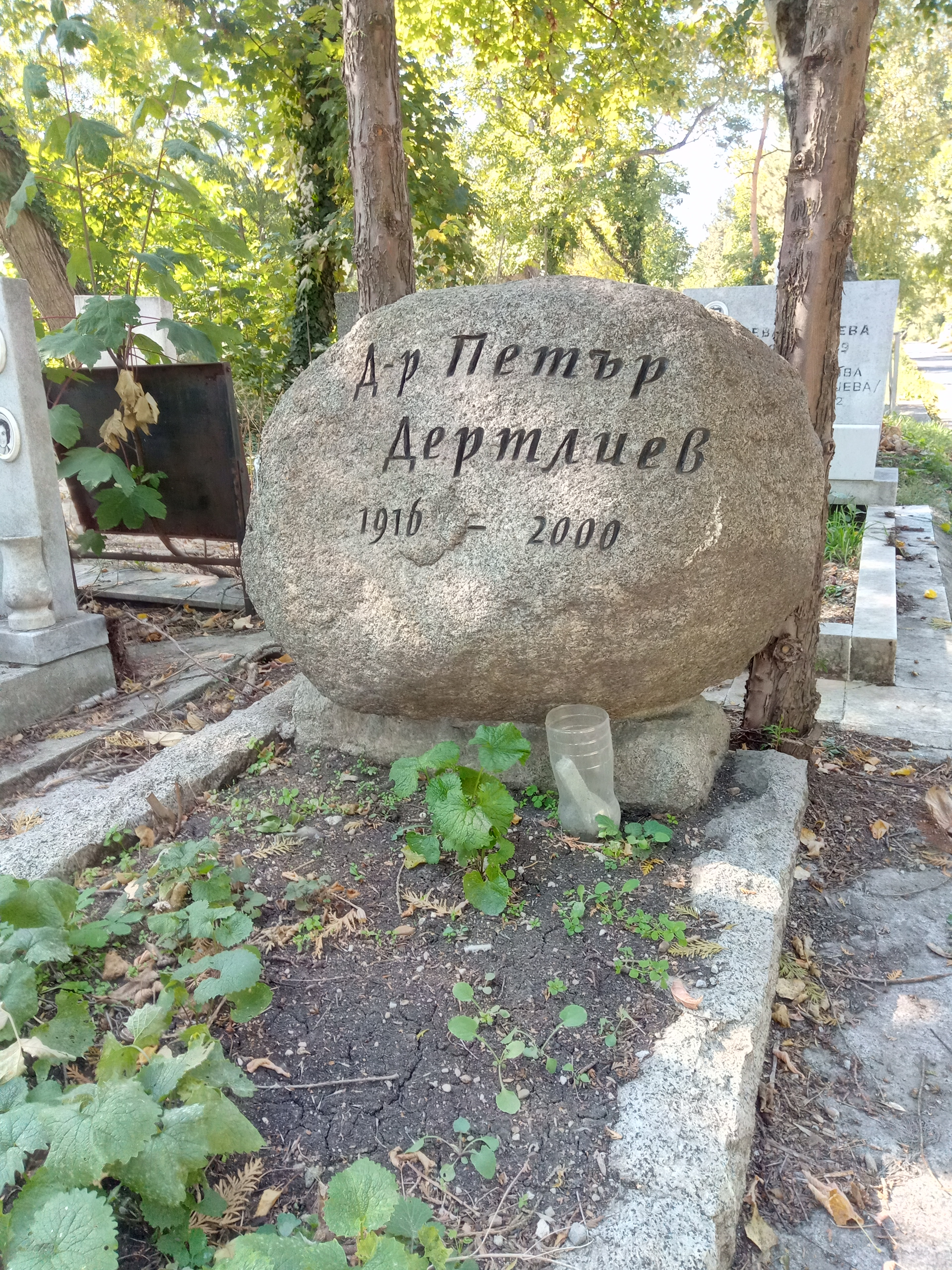
The Grave of Petar Dertliev at Sofia Central Cemetery (42°42′53.6″N 023°20′17.9″E)
