= People's Republic of Bulgaria =

Bulgarian state from 1946 to 1990

People's Republic of Bulgaria Народна република България
- 1946–1990
- Flag (1971–1990) Coat of arms (1971–1990)
- Motto: Пролетарии от всички страни, съединявайте се! Proletarii ot vsichki starni, saedinyavayte se! "Workers of the world, unite!"
- Anthem: Шуми Марица; Shumi Maritsa "Maritsa Rushes" (1946–1947) Републико наша, здравей! Republiko nasha, zdravey! "Our Republic, Hail!" (1947–1951) Българийо мила, земя на герои Bŭlgariyo mila, zemya na geroi "Dear Bulgaria, Land of Heroes" (1951–1964) Мила Родино; Mila Rodino "Dear Motherland" (from 1964)
- The People's Republic of Bulgaria until 1989
- Status: Satellite state of the Soviet Union, member of the Warsaw Pact and Comecon
- Capital and largest city: Sofia; 42°41′50″N 23°19′24″E
- Official languages: Bulgarian
- Official script: Cyrillic
- Religion: Secular state (de jure); State atheism (de facto); Bulgarian Orthodoxy (majority dominant); Islam (minority)
- Demonym: Bulgarian
- Government: Unitary communist state
- De facto leader
  - 1946–1949: Georgi Dimitrov
  - 1949–1950: Vasil Kolarov
  - 1950–1954: Valko Chervenkov
  - 1954–1956: Collective leadership (Valko Chervenkov and Todor Zhivkov)
  - 1956–1989: Todor Zhivkov
  - 1989–1990: Petar Mladenov
- Head of state
  - 1946–1947 (first): Vasil Kolarov
  - 1990 (last): Zhelyu Zhelev
- Head of government
  - 1946 (first): Kimon Georgiev
  - 1990 (last): Andrey Lukanov
- Legislature: National Assembly
- Historical era: Cold War
  - Monarchy abolished: 15 September 1946
  - Zhivkov Constitution: 18 May 1971
  - End of the People's Republic: 15 November 1990
  - 1991 Constitution: 12 July 1991

Area
  - Total: 110,994 km^{2} (42,855 sq mi)
  - Water (%): 0.3

Population
  - 1946: 7,029,349
  - 1989: 8,987,000
- GDP (PPP): 1989 estimate
  - Total: $51 billion
  - Per capita: $5,697
- HDI (1990 formula): 0.708 high
- Currency: Bulgarian lev
- Time zone: UTC+2 (EET)
  - Summer (DST): UTC+3 (EEST)
- Calling code: +359
- ISO 3166 code: BG
Preceded by	Succeeded by
Tsardom of Bulgaria	Republic of Bulgaria

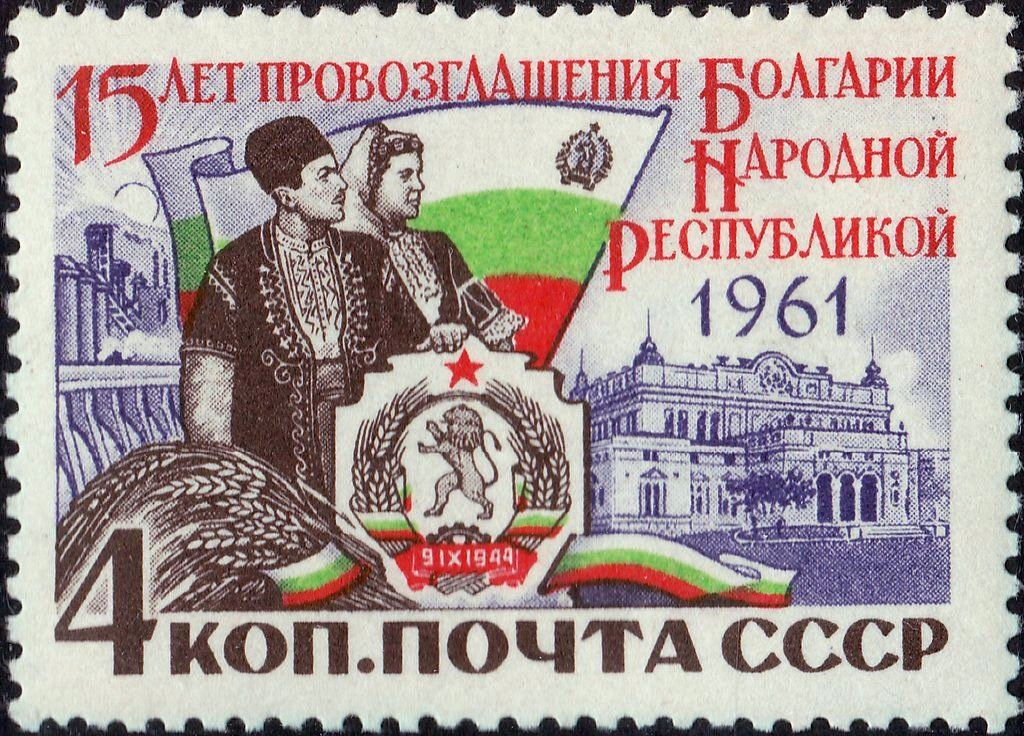
1961 USSR stamp marking the 15th anniversary of the People's Republic of Bulgaria

The People's Republic of Bulgaria (PRB; Bulgarian: Народна република България, НРБ, romanized: Narodna republika Bŭlgariya, NRB; pronounced [nɐˈrɔdnɐ rɛˈpublikɐ bɐɫˈɡarijɐ]) was the Bulgarian state that existed from 1946 to 1990, ruled by the Bulgarian Communist Party (BCP; Bulgarian: Българска комунистическа партия (БКП)) together with its coalition partner, the Bulgarian Agrarian People's Union. Bulgaria was a close ally and one of the most loyal satellite states of the Soviet Union during the Cold War, sometimes being called the 16th Soviet Republic rather than an independent country. Bulgaria was also part of Comecon as well as a member of the Warsaw Pact. The Bulgarian resistance movement during World War II deposed the Tsardom of Bulgaria administration in the Bulgarian coup d'état of 1944 which ended the country's alliance with the Axis powers and led to the People's Republic in 1946.

The BCP modeled its policies after those of the Soviet Union, transforming the country over the course of a decade from an agrarian peasant society into an industrialized socialist society. In the mid-1950s and after the death of Stalin, the party's hardliners lost influence and a period of social liberalization and stability followed under Todor Zhivkov. Varying degrees of conservative or liberal influence followed. After a new energy and transportation infrastructure was constructed, by 1960 manufacturing became the dominant sector of the economy and Bulgaria became a major exporter of household goods and later of computer technologies, earning it the nickname of "Silicon Valley of the Eastern Bloc". The country's relatively high productivity levels and high scores on social development rankings made it a model for other socialist countries' administrative policies.

In 1989, after a few years of liberal influence, political reforms were initiated and Zhivkov, who had served as head of the party since 1954, was removed from office in a BCP congress. In 1990, under the leadership of Aleksandar Lilov, the BCP changed its name to the Bulgarian Socialist Party (BSP) and adopted social democracy and democratic socialism in place of Marxism–Leninism. The BSP won the June 1990 election, which was the first openly contested multi-party election since 1931. The first elected president Zhelyu Zhelev was inaugurated on 1 August and became the first oppositional president of Bulgaria in the People's Republic. On 15 November the People's Republic of Bulgaria was officially renamed to the Republic of Bulgaria. On 12 July 1991 with the new Constitution of Bulgaria all the symbols of the People's Republic of Bulgaria were officially dissolved.

Geographically, the People's Republic of Bulgaria had the same borders as present-day Bulgaria and it bordered the Black Sea to the east; Romania to the north; Yugoslavia (via SRs Serbia and Macedonia) to the west and Greece and Turkey to the south.

== History ==
On 1 March 1941, the Kingdom of Bulgaria signed the Tripartite Pact, and officially became a member of the Axis. Following the German invasion of Yugoslavia and Greece in April, Bulgaria came to occupy large parts of those countries. In 1942, the anti-Axis resistance movement Fatherland Front was formed from a mixture of Communists, Socialists, left-wing Agrarians and members of Zveno. The estimate for the number of partisans (armed guerrilla fighters) at any one time in Bulgaria is 18,000.

=== Communist coup ===
In 1944, with the entry of the Red Army into Romania, the Kingdom of Bulgaria renounced the Axis and declared neutrality. On 5 September, the Soviet Union declared war on the kingdom and three days later the Red Army entered north-eastern Bulgaria, prompting the government to declare support in order to minimise military conflict. On 9 September, communist guerrillas launched a coup d'état which de facto ended the rule of the Bulgarian monarchy and its administration, after which a new government assumed power led by the Fatherland Front, which itself was led by the Bulgarian Communist Party.

=== Early years and Chervenkov era ===
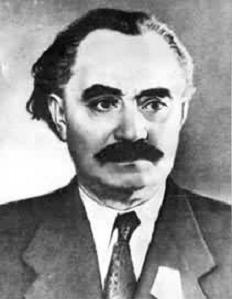
Georgi Dimitrov, leader of the Bulgarian Communist Party from 1946 to 1949

After taking power, the Fatherland Front formed a coalition led by former Prime Minister Kimon Georgiev, which included the Social Democrats and the Agrarians. Under the terms of the peace settlement, Bulgaria was allowed to keep Southern Dobruja, but formally renounced all claims to Greek and Yugoslav territory. 150,000 Bulgarians settled during the occupation were expelled from Western Thrace. The Communists deliberately took a minor role in the new government at first, though an all-Communist regency council was set up for the young Tsar Simeon II. The Soviet representatives held the real power. A Communist-controlled People's Militia was set up, which harassed and intimidated non-Communist parties.

On 1 February 1945, Regent Prince Kiril, former Prime Minister Bogdan Filov, and hundreds of other officials of the kingdom were arrested on charges of war crimes. By June, Kirill and the other Regents, twenty-two former ministers, and many others had been executed. The new government began to arrest Nazi collaborators. Thousands of people were charged with treason or participating in counter-revolutionary conspiracy and sentenced to either death or life in prison. When the army returned following the German surrender, the regime also purged the officer corps. As the war came to a halt, the government expanded its campaign of political revolution to attack economic elites in banking and private business. It is estimated that, between 1944 and 1989, between 5,000 and 10,000 people were killed in Bulgaria as part of agricultural collectivisation and political repression, although documentation is insufficient for a definitive judgement. Figures for fatalities in forced labour camps also remain elusive. According to official sources, 2,730 people have been sentenced to death, but unofficial estimates suggested that as many as 20,000 people were reported killed under the regime between 1944 and 1989.

These revolutionary attacks strengthened when it became apparent that the United States and United Kingdom had little interest in Bulgaria. In November 1945, Communist Party leader Georgi Dimitrov returned to Bulgaria after 22 years in exile. He made a truculent speech that rejected cooperation with opposition groups. Elections held a few weeks later resulted in a large majority for the Fatherland Front.

In September 1946, the monarchy was abolished by plebiscite, which resulted in 95.6 percent voting in favour of a republic, and Simeon was sent into exile. The Communists openly took power, and Bulgaria was declared a People's Republic. Vasil Kolarov, the number-three man in the party, became president. Over the next year, the Communists consolidated their hold on power. Elections for a constituent assembly in October 1946 gave the Communists a majority. A month later, Dimitrov became prime minister.

The Agrarians refused to co-operate with the authorities, and in June 1947 their leader Nikola Petkov was arrested, despite strong international protests. The new Agrarian leader, Georgi Traykov, repudiated his party's traditional ideology and defined a new role for it as the helpmate of the Bulgarian Communist Party. This marked the formation of a Communist establishment in Bulgaria. In December 1947, the constituent assembly ratified a new constitution for the republic, referred to as the "Dimitrov Constitution". The constitution was drafted with the help of Soviet jurists using the 1936 Soviet Constitution as a model. By 1948, the remaining opposition parties were either realigned or dissolved; the Social Democrats merged with the Communists, while the Agrarian Union became a loyal partner of the Communists.

During 1948–1949, Orthodox, Muslim, Protestant and Roman Catholic religious organisations were restrained or banned. Both Protestant and Catholic preachers were frequently accused by Communist prosecutors of having ties to Western intelligence agencies, particularly those of the United States and United Kingdom. The Orthodox Church of Bulgaria continued functioning but never regained the influence it held under the monarchy; many high roles within the church were assumed by communist functionaries.

Dimitrov died in 1949 and for a time Bulgaria adopted collective leadership. Vulko Chervenkov led the Communist Party and Vasil Kolarov was prime minister. This broke down a year later, when Kolarov died and Chervenkov added prime minister to his titles. Chervenkov started a process of rapid industrialization modeled after the Soviet industrialisation led by Stalin in the 1930s and agriculture was collectivised.

Stalin's death in 1953 had political repercussions in Bulgaria. In 1954, Chervenkov accepted the collective leadership, remained prime minister, but ceded his position as party leader to Todor Zhivkov. The government also released a large number of political prisoners and focused on improving living standards rather than accelerating industrialization. Chervenkov stayed on as prime minister until April 1956, when he was finally dismissed and replaced by Anton Yugov. With the official start of de-Stalinization in 1955, censorship was relaxed somewhat and the victims of the Kostovite trials, including Kostov himself, began to be rehabilitated.

By the mid-1950s, living standards rose significantly, and in 1957 collective farm workers benefited from the first agricultural pension and welfare system in Eastern Europe. Bulgaria underwent rapid industrial development from the 1950s onwards. Starting with the 1960s, the country's economy appeared profoundly transformed. Despite the achievements of this modernisation, many difficulties remained, such as poor housing and inadequate urban infrastructure.

=== Macedonization in Pirin Macedonia ===
In 1946, Stalin sent the following order to the Bulgarian delegation:

Cultural autonomy must be granted to Pirin Macedonia within the framework of Bulgaria. Tito has shown himself more flexible than you – possibly because he lives in a multiethnic state and has had to give equal rights to the various peoples. Autonomy will be the first step towards the unification of Macedonia, but in view of the present situation there should be no hurry on this matter. Otherwise, in the eyes of the Macedonian people the whole mission of achieving Macedonian autonomy will remain with Tito and you will get the criticism. You seem to be afraid of Kimon Georgiev, you have involved yourselves too much with him and do not want to give autonomy to Pirin Macedonia. That a Macedonian consciousness has not yet developed among the population is of no account. No such consciousness existed in Byelorussia either when we proclaimed it a Soviet Republic. However, later it was shown that a Byelorussian people did, in fact, exist.

The government used force, threats and intimidation, branding opponents of the policy as fascists and chauvinists. Some were resettled as far as Vojvodina after they had been resettled from Pirin to SR Macedonia for unsuccessful Macedonization. Bulgaria adopted the Communist policy of closer rapprochement with Yugoslavia. Dimitrov then launched the initiative of a Balkan Federation that would range from Pirin to the Šar Mountains and reflect a Macedonian consciousness. For this purpose, he launched a policy of forced Macedonisation of the Bulgarian population in the Pirin region through conscious change of ethnic self-determination, held by means of administrative coercion and intensive propaganda.

In December 1946, Dimitrov conducted a census in Pirin. State authorities instructed the local population in the Pirin region to mark administrative records such as "Macedonian", including Pomaks, with the exception of those originating within the country. At its meeting on 21 December, the Regional Committee of the Workers' Party in Upper Cuma decided to accept a formula indicating 70% of residents were "Macedonians". As a result, among the 281,015 inhabitants, 169,444 were identified as ethnic Macedonians.

In 1947, Bulgaria and Yugoslavia signed agreements whereby Pirin Macedonia became part of federal Yugoslavia, which proceeded to unify Pirin Macedonia with Vardar Macedonia and abolished visa regimes and removed customs services. Shortly thereafter in 1948, due to the rupture in relations between Tito and Stalin, the contract was dissolved. For a while, BCP and the Bulgarian state held contradictory, policy on the Macedonian issue. In 1963, at the March Plenum of the Central Committee of the Communist Party, Zhivkov declared that the population in Pirin Macedonia was part of Bulgaria that was forced by the Communist Party.

=== 1971–1989 ===
According to declassified documents, Bulgaria planned on fomenting a crisis between Turkey and Greece in 1971. The operation was codenamed "Cross" and the plan was that Bulgarian secret agents would set fire in the Ecumenical Patriarchate of Constantinople and make it look like the work of Turks. The declassified documents state that "An intervention" in the religious entity would have "significantly damage[d] Turkish-Greek relations and force[d] the United States to choose one side in the ensuing crisis". In addition, the Bulgarians also planned to boost the effect of its operation against Greece and Turkey by conducting "active measures" "for putting the enemy in a position of delusion". The plan was developed by the 7th Department of the First Main Directorate of the DS (intelligence and secret police services of communist Bulgaria), and was affirmed by Deputy Head of the Directorate on 16 November 1970, and approved by its Head. The operation was supposed to be prepared by the middle of 1971 and then executed, but it was abandoned.

In 1971, the new "Zhivkovskata" Constitution added "Article 1", which grants the PA as the sole ruling a "leading force of society and the state". Zhivkov was promoted to Head of State (Chairman of the State Council) and Stanko Todorov became prime minister. Bulgaria signed the Helsinki Accords in 1975, which guaranteed human rights and fundamental freedoms, including freedom of movement, contacts, information, culture and education, right to work, and the rights to education and medical care. However, subsequent events regarding Bulgarian Turks in the 1980s were a direct violation of these commitments.

In 1978, Bulgaria attracted international attention when dissident writer Georgi Markov was accosted on a London street by a stranger who rammed his leg with the tip of an umbrella. Markov died shortly afterwards of ricin poisoning. He was the victim of the Bulgarian secret service, as confirmed by KGB documents revealing that they had jointly planned the operation with Bulgaria. In 1981, Bulgaria celebrated the yearlong 1300th Anniversary of the Bulgarian State, in tribute to the establishment of the first Bulgarian state. The Bulgarian People's Army sided with the Soviet Union and the Afghan communists during the Soviet–Afghan War in Afghanistan fighting the jihadist guerrillas from 1982 until its withdrawal in 1989.

=== End of the People's Republic ===
1989–1990 Bulgarian protests
- Part of the Revolutions of 1989
- Date: 3 November 1989 – 15 November 1990
- Location: Bulgaria
- Participants: Dissident movements (primarily Ecoglasnost and SDS) Bulgarian Communist Party
- Outcome: End of the Communist regime in Bulgaria: 1990 Bulgarian Constitutional Assembly election; End of the People's Republic of Bulgaria and establishment of the Republic of Bulgaria; Implementation of a multi-party liberal democracy; Gradual transition to a free market economy

By the 1980s, the conservatives controlled the government. Some social and cultural liberalization and progress was led by Lyudmila Zhivkova, Todor's daughter, who became a source of strong disapproval and annoyance to the Communist Party due to her unorthodox lifestyle that included the practicing of Eastern religions. She died in 1981, approaching her 39th birthday.

A campaign of forced assimilation was waged against the ethnic Turkish minority, who were forbidden to speak the Turkish language and were forced to adopt Bulgarian names took place in the winter of 1984. The issue strained Bulgaria's economic relations with the West. The 1989 expulsion of Turks from Bulgaria caused a significant drop in agricultural production in the southern regions due to the loss of around 300,000 workers.

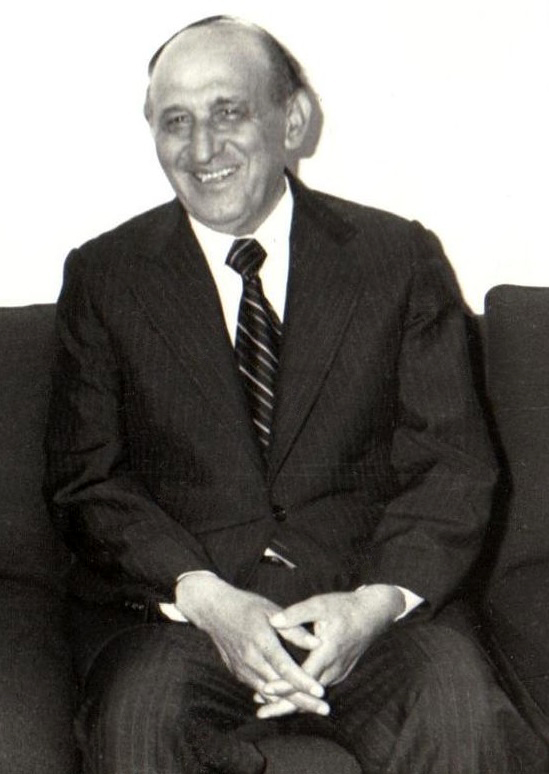
Todor Zhivkov

In the late 1980s, the Communists, like their leader, had grown too feeble to resist the demand for change. Liberal outcry at the breakup of an environmental demonstration in Sofia in October 1989 broadened into a general campaign for political reform. More moderate elements in the Communist leadership reacted by deposing Zhivkov and replacing him with foreign minister Petar Mladenov on 10 November 1989.

This move gained a short respite for the Communist Party and prevented revolutionary change. Mladenov promised to open up the regime, stating that he supported multi-party elections. Demonstrations throughout the country led Mladenov to announce that the Communist Party would cede its monopoly over the political system. On 15 January 1990, the National Assembly formally amended the legal code to abolish the Communist Party's "leading role". In June 1990, the first multi-party elections since 1939 were held. Finally on 15 November 1990, the seventh Grand National Assembly voted to change the country's name to the Republic of Bulgaria and removed the Communist state emblem from the national flag.

A 2009 poll conducted by the Pew Global Attitudes Project found that only 11% of Bulgarians believe ordinary people benefited from the 1989 transition. Sixteen percent say the state is run for the benefit of all people, down from 55% in 1991. However, a 2019 poll conducted by the Pew Global Attitudes Project found that 55 percent of Bulgarians approved of the shift to a market economy and 54 percent approved of the shift to multiparty democracy.

== Government and politics ==
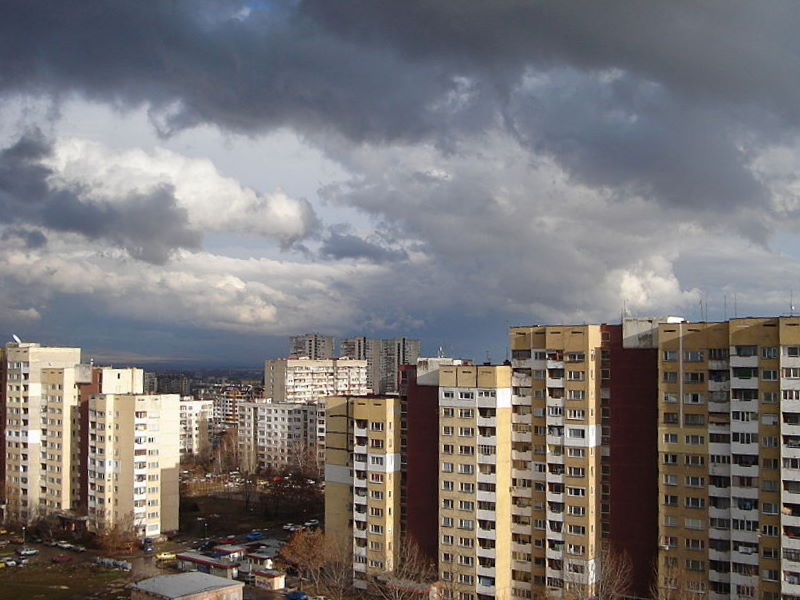
Pre-fabricated apartment blocks in Mladost, Sofia

The constitution was changed two times, with the Zhivkov Constitution lasting the longest. According to article 1, "The People's Republic of Bulgaria is a socialist state, headed by the working people of the village and the city. The leading force in society and politics is the Bulgarian Communist Party." The BCP created an extensive nomenklatura on each organizational level.

The PRB functioned as a unitary one-party people's republic, with People's Committees representing local governance. Their role was to exercise Party decisions in their respective areas and to otherwise defer to popular opinion in decision-making. In the late 1980s, the BCP had an estimated peak membership of 1,000,000 — more than 10% of the population.

== Military ==
In 1946, the military rapidly adopted a Soviet military doctrine and organization. The country received large amounts of Soviet weaponry, and eventually established a domestic military vehicle production capability. By the year 1988, the Bulgarian People's Army (Българска народна армия) numbered 152,000 men, serving in four different branches – Land Forces, Navy, Air and Air Defense Forces, and Missile Forces. The Bulgarian People's Army (BPA) operated 3,000 tanks, 2,000 armored vehicles, 2,500 large caliber artillery systems, over 500 combat aircraft, 33 combat vessels, as well as 67 Scud missile launchers, 24 SS-23 launchers and dozens of FROG-7 artillery rocket launchers.

== Economy ==
In the 1970s, the People's Republic of Bulgaria had a Gini coefficient of 18, ranking among the countries with the lowest levels of income inequality in the world.

Percentage of exports of Bulgaria (1945–1948)
	1945	1946	1947	1948 (Jan. to May)
Soviet Union	95.2%	66%	51.9%	41.5%
Eastern Europe	2.3%	17%	33.7%	34.2%
Britain	–	0.5%	0.1%	0.3%
United States	–	5.2%	6.0%	0.2%
Total	12,397,00	14,942,000	24,532,740	12,127,909

Percentage of imports of Bulgaria (1945–1948)
	1945	1946	1947	1948 (January to May)
Soviet Union	79.6%	81.9%	60.6%	58.9%
Eastern Europe	6.8%	8.8%	26.9%	26.2%
Britain	–	–	0.7%	1.0%
United States	–	3.5%	1.3%	1.1%
Total	5,820,000	17,514,000	21,415,418	16,968,786

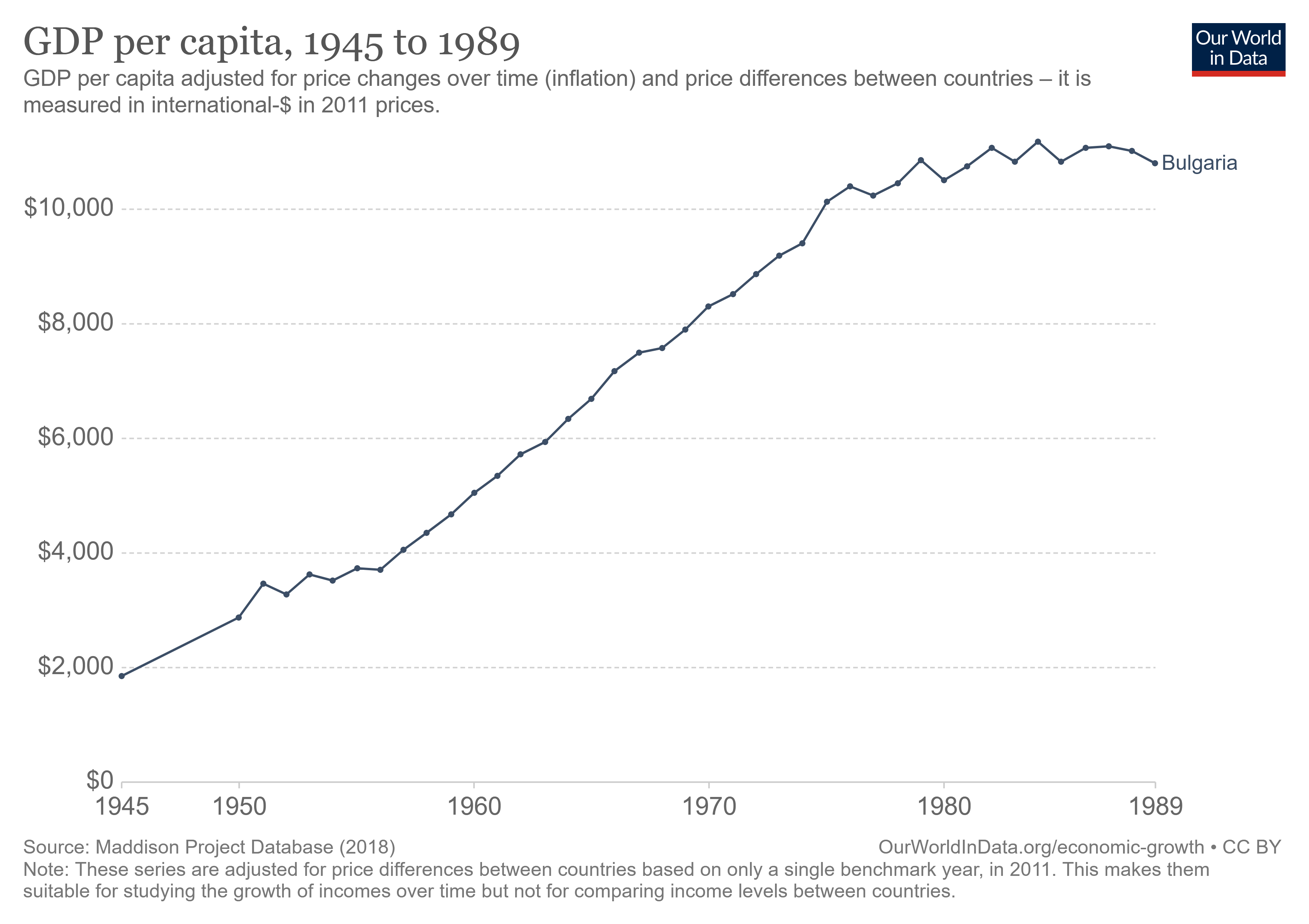
GDP per capita from 1945 to 1989

The PRB adopted a centrally planned economy, similar to those in other COMECON states. In the mid-1940s, when collectivisation began, Bulgaria was a primarily agrarian state, with some 80% of its population located in rural areas. Production facilities of all sectors were rapidly nationalised. Chervenkov finally ended all private economic activity. Bulgarian agricultural productivity increased rapidly after collectivisation. Large-scale mechanisation resulted in an immense growth in labour productivity. Government subsidies covered the large losses from the artificially low consumer prices.

Chervenkov's Stalinist policy led to a massive industrialisation and development of the energy sector, which remained one of Bulgaria's most advanced economic sectors. His rule lasted from 1950 to 1955, and saw the construction of dozens of dams and hydroelectric powerplants, chemical works, the Elatsite gold and copper mine and many others. The war-time coupon system was abolished, and healthcare and education were government provided. All this was achieved with strict government control and organization. Labor came from prisoner brigades and the Bulgarian Brigadier Movement – a youth labor movement where young people worked on construction projects. Bulgaria was involved in computer construction, which earned it the nickname "Silicon Valley of the Eastern Bloc".

Bulgarian engineers developed the first Bulgarian computer, the Vitosha, as well as the Pravetz computers. Bulgaria is the only Balkan Country to operate a supercomputer, an IBM Blue Gene/P. In the 1960s, Zhivkov introduced reforms that had a positive effect on the country's economy. He put emphasis on light industry, agriculture, tourism, as well as on Information Technology in the 1970s and the 1980s. Surplus agricultural production could be sold freely, prices were lowered even more, and new equipment for light industrial production was imported. Bulgaria became the first Communist country to purchase a license from Coca-Cola in 1965.

Despite relative stability, the economy shared the same drawbacks of other countries from Eastern Europe – it traded almost entirely with the Soviet Union (more than 60%) and planners could not take into account whether there were markets for the goods produced. This resulted in surpluses of certain products, while other commodities were in deficit. The other main trade partners were East Germany and Czechoslovakia, while countries such as Mongolia and various African countries were also large-scale importers of Bulgarian goods. The country enjoyed good trade relations with various non-Communist countries, most notably West Germany and Italy. In order to combat the low quality of many goods, a comprehensive State standard system was introduced in 1970, which included strict quality requirements for all sorts of products, machines and buildings.

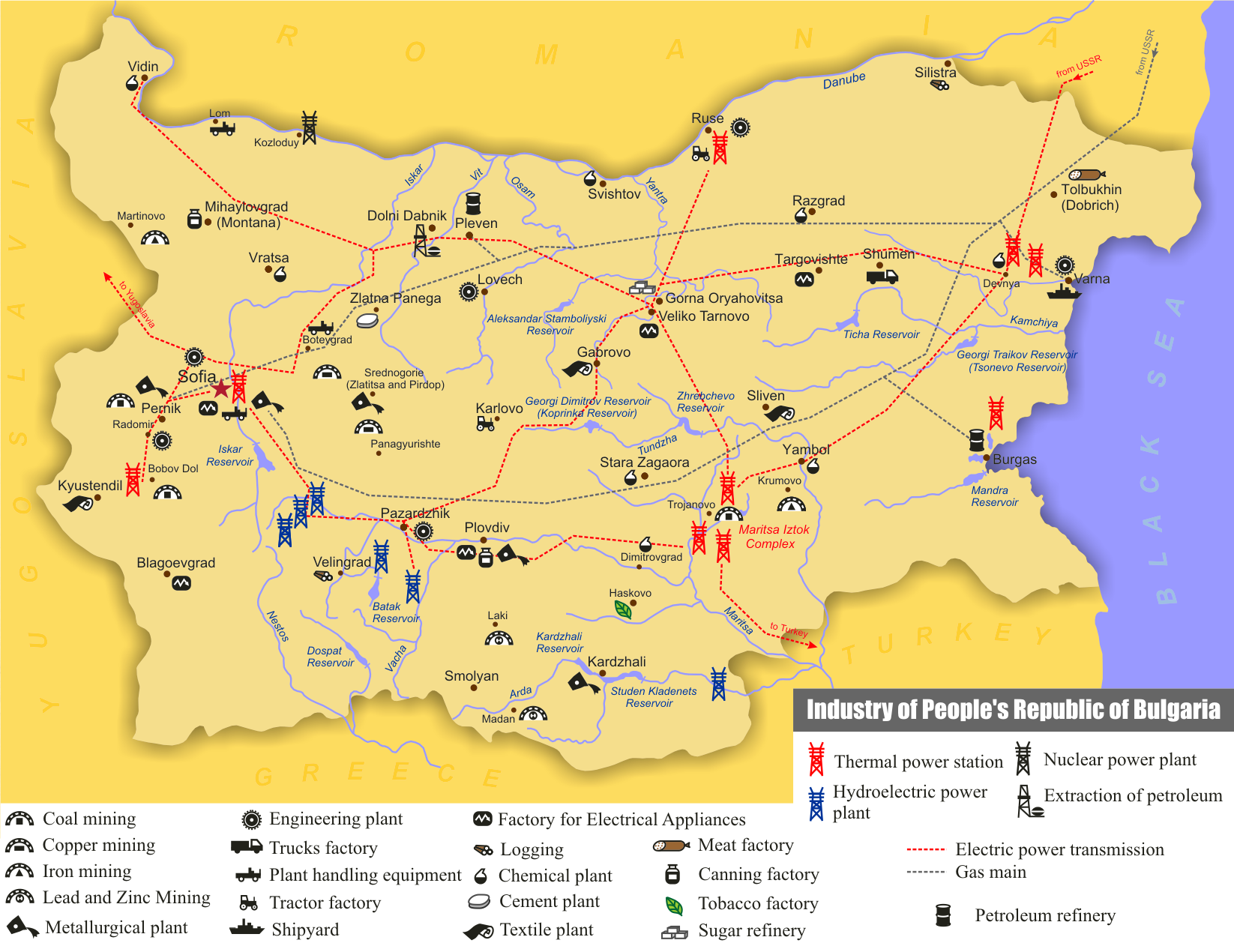
Industry of the People's Republic of Bulgaria

The People's Republic of Bulgaria (PRB) had an average GDP per capita for an Eastern Bloc country. Average purchasing power was one of the lowest in the Eastern Bloc, mostly due to the larger availability of commodities than in other socialist countries, real wages from 1949 to 1989 increased by 195%, real average monthly amount of a pension rose by 868% and real monthly pension for old age and length of service rose by 342% in the same period. Workers employed abroad often received higher payments, and could thus afford a wider range of goods to purchase. According to official figures, in 1988 100 out of 100 households had a television set, 95 out of 100 had a radio, 96 out of 100 had a refrigerator and 40 out of 100 had an automobile.

Along with the improvements in agriculture and the growth of productivity, the GDP per capita grew from $1.864 to $10.800 in 1989, peaking in 1984, when the GDP per capita was about $11.100. From the mid-1950s until the end of the 1970s, the growth was constant until the 1970s energy crisis hit the country. The crisis along with some structural problems, reduced the growth during the 1980s.

=== Automotive industry ===
After 1965, Renault and Fiat chose Bulgaria to site their factories to make automobiles for sale in the Eastern Bloc partnership. Bulgarrenault operated from 1966 to 1971, making cars based on the Renault 8 and the Renault 10. The factories were in Plovdiv. In the end, around 6,500 cars were produced. The Bulgarian version of the Alpine A110 was also made under the marque Bulgaralpine. From 1967 to 1971, Pirin-Fiat built around 730 cars, consisting of the Fiat 850 and the Fiat 124. In 1968, a contract was signed between the Bulgarian government and Moskvitch to build the Moskvitch 408 and later the Moskvitch 2141, from which around 12,000 cars were produced by 1990.

== Culture ==
Culture in PRB was strictly regulated by the government, although there were some periods of liberalization (meaning entrance in Bulgaria of Western literature, music, etc.). The thaw in intellectual life had continued from 1951 until the middle of the decade. Chervenkov's resignation and the literary and cultural flowering in the Soviet Union created expectations that the process would continue, but the Hungarian Revolution of 1956 ended the experiment. Chervenkov was appointed minister of education and culture. In 1957 and 1958, he purged the leadership of the Bulgarian Writers' Union and dismissed liberal journalists and editors from their positions. His crackdowns effectively ended the "Bulgarian thaw" of independent writers and artists inspired by Khrushchev's 1956 speech against Stalinism.

In July 1968, the 9th World Festival of Youth and Students took place in Sofia, attracting 20,000 people from 138 countries. The main holiday of the country was the Day of the People's Uprising of 9 September (Ден на народното въстание на 9 септември), celebrations of which were modeled on Soviet celebrations on October Revolution Day. The celebrations saw the Bulgarian Politbureau greeting the masses from Georgi Dimitrov Mausoleum; however, in this case there were no military parades. The yearlong 1300th anniversary celebrations of the Bulgarian State took place in 1981 to commemorate the establishment of the First Bulgarian State in 681. There were 23,000 events connected with the anniversary, including a military parade and the creation of a monument in Shumen.

== Legacy ==
A majority of the Bulgarian population says that it feels sympathy and nostalgia for Todor Zhivkov, who led the People’s Republic of Bulgaria from 1956 to 1989. This positive perception is based in particular on memories of low prices for food and raw materials, full employment, and widespread access to holidays on the Black Sea coast. Older people are the most likely to look back fondly on this period, regardless of their ethnic background or religious affiliation. In 2010, conservative Prime Minister Boyko Borisov sparked controversy by declaring that "achieving even one hundredth of what Zhivkov accomplished would already be an immense success for any government."

== See also ==
- Bulgarian cosmonaut program
- Captive Nations
