= Grand National Assembly of Bulgaria =

In Bulgaria, a Grand National Assembly (Note: Bulgarian: Велико народно събрание, romanized: Veliko narodno sǎbranie) is a special meeting of the National Assembly which may be convened in order for matters of special jurisdiction.

The first Grand National Assembly of Bulgaria was conducted from 17 April to 26 June 1879. Its chairman was Anthim I.

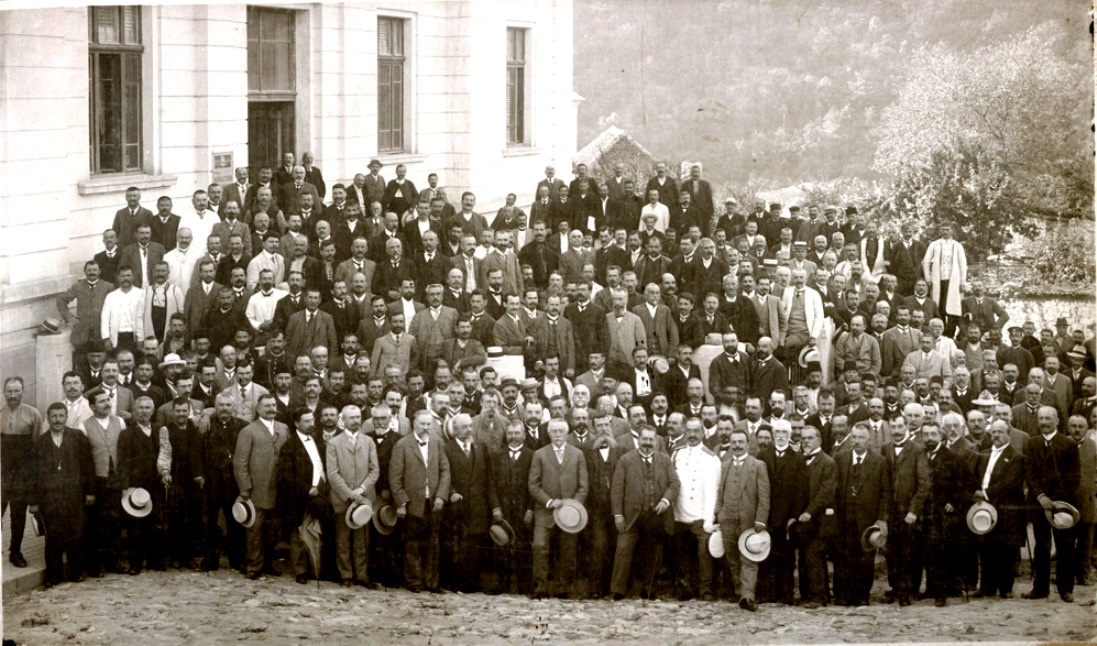
Great National Assembly in Tarnovo

== History ==
In the first Grand National Assembly, Alexander of Battenberg was chosen as Prince of Bulgaria.

The second assembly opened on 1 July 1881, with conservative Todor Ikonomov as chairman; the third commenced in 1886, with 443 members and chaired by Georgi Zhivkov; the fourth convened from 3 to 17 May 1893, with chairman Dimitar Petkov.

In the Fifth Grand National Assembly which convened in 1911 with chairman Stoyan Danev, the title "knyaz" was changed to "tsar" and the assembly passed the Tarnovo Constitution.

The sixth assembly convened in 1946 with chairman Vasil Kolarov. It passed the first constitution of the People's Republic of Bulgaria.

The seventh Grand National Assembly passed the Constitution of the Republic of Bulgaria on 12 July 1991.

The 1st, 2nd, 3rd, 4th and 5th Grand National Assemblies were convened in Veliko Tarnovo while the 6th and 7th were conducted in Sofia.
