= Constitution of Bulgaria =

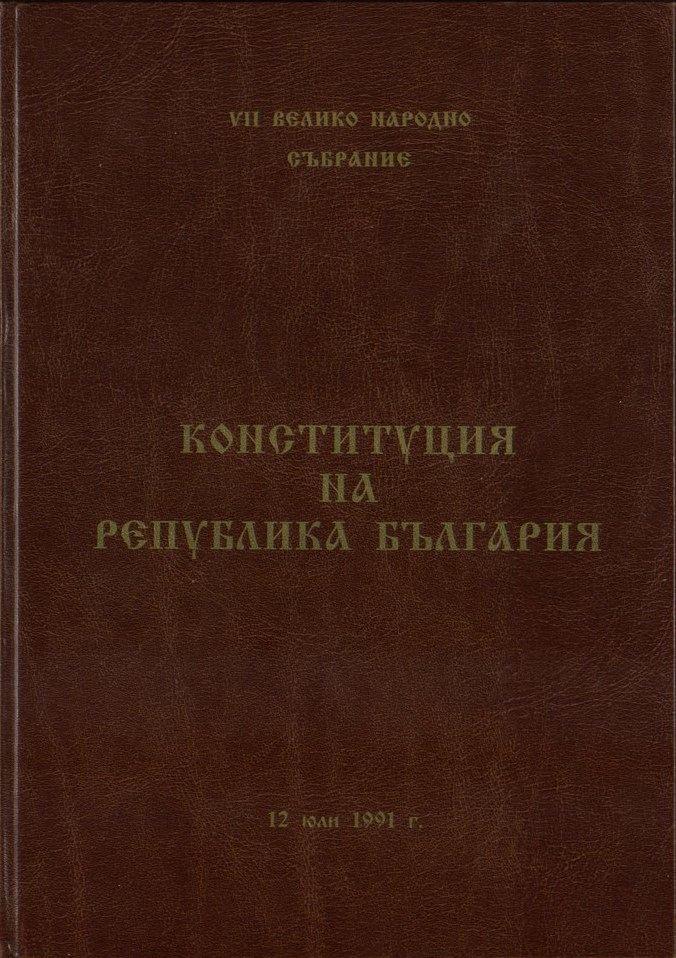
- The cover of the Constitution

Overview
- Original title: Конституция на Република България
- Jurisdiction: Bulgaria
- Date effective: 13 July 1991
- System: Parliamentary

Government structure
- Branches: 3
- Executive: Council of Ministers
- Judiciary: Supreme Court of Cassation of Bulgaria
- Federalism: Unitary

History
- Amendments: 6
- Last amended: 22 December 2023
- Author: 7th Grand National Assembly
- Supersedes: Zhivkov Constitution

The Constitution of the Republic of Bulgaria (Note: Bulgarian: Конституция на Република България, romanized: Konstitucija na Republika Bǎlgarija) is the supreme and basic law of the Republic of Bulgaria. The current constitution was adopted on 12 July 1991 by the 7th Grand National Assembly of Bulgaria, and defines the country as a unitary parliamentary republic. It has been amended six times (in 2003, 2005, 2006, 2007, 2015 and 2023).

Chronologically, it is the fourth constitution of Bulgaria, the first being the Tarnovo Constitution of 1879. It was immediately succeeded by the two Socialist-era constitutions–the Dimitrov Constitution (named after Georgi Dimitrov), in force between 1947 and 1971, and the Zhivkov Constitution (named after Todor Zhivkov), in force between 1971 and 1991.

== Content ==
=== Political System ===
==== Distribution of powers ====
The constitution sets about a parliamentary form of government, in which executive power is rested upon the Government of Bulgaria, legislative power within National Assembly and judicial power is distributed through the judicial institutions, with the Supreme Judicial Council at its head. The institution of President of Bulgaria is created as an arbiter between the other branches of government and wields mostly ceremonial powers, most notable of which is his position as Commander-in-chief of the Armed forces of Bulgaria.

==== Government formation ====
The Bulgarian government is nominally appointed by the President, but the latter must follow strict protocol during said appointment. When government formation takes place, the President is obliged to give the first mandate over to the largest party or faction within the national assembly. That faction then puts forward its proposed government, when is then put to a vote in the assembly. For the government to be elected, it needs to obtain the support of a majority of elected representatives during a session in which there is a quorum. Should the largest party refuse the mandate, or should it fail to secure the support of a majority in the house, the President is then obliged to hand the mandate over to the second largest party or faction. Only if the second largest faction also fails to form a government is the President allowed to exercise discretion appointing a temporary caretaker government until new elections can be held.

=== Society ===
==== Identity ====
The Bulgarian constitution states that the territorial integrity of the country is "inviolable" and expressly forbids any autonomous territorial formations from being allowed to exist. The Bulgarian language is designated as the country's only official language.

==== Religion ====
The constitution establishes the Eastern Orthodox Church as "a traditional religion in the Republic of Bulgaria", but states that religious institutions must be separate from the state and forbids religious communities and institutions from being used for political purposes. It also prohibits the formation of political parties based on religious or racial/ethnic affiliation.

==== Marriage ====
Marriage is defined as a "voluntary union between a man and a woman", explicitly rejecting any marriages other than civil marriages concluded under this clause, thus effectively prohibiting both same-sex and polygamous marriages.

=== Amendments to the constitution ===
Amendments to most parts of the constitution may be adopted by the ordinary National Assembly, but the adoption of an entirely new constitution or the alteration of key articles, such as those pertaining to the form of state organization or national territory can only be adopted through the calling of a Grand National Assembly of Bulgaria. The Grand National Assembly is an extended National Assembly composed of 400 elected representatives, instead of the 240 in the ordinary National Assembly. It is tasked specifically with making major alterations to the nation's constitution and is dissolved following the completion of the amendment process.

In either case, constitutional amendments may only be proposed either by 25% of the elected representatives within the assembly or by the President and require a two-thirds supermajority of elected representatives in order to be adopted.

== Proposed 2020 amendments ==
During the 2020–2021 Bulgarian protests, Prime Minister Boyko Borisov announced that he would back a change in the country's constitution. The proposal tabled by his party would call for a Grand National Assembly in order to discuss the changes. Among them was a proposal to scrap the institution of the Grand National Assembly altogether, reduce the terms of judges and prosecutors and reduce the number of elected representatives in the ordinary National Assembly from 240 to 120. His proposals were supported by his coalition partners in the SDS and conditionally by the VMRO, pending additional amendments to return conscription and adopt further articles prohibiting same-sex marriage, among others. The Volya Movement did not comment on the proposals, but rejected the government's calls for Grand National Assembly elections. Democratic Bulgaria tacitly supported the proposals, while President Rumen Radev, the opposition Bulgarian Socialist Party and There Are Such People parties and opposition leader Maya Manolova rejected them outright. Likewise, the proposals were also mostly rejected by the protesters on the streets.

== Proposed 2023 amendments ==
On 28 July 2023, 166 MPs from the parliamentary groups of PP–DB, GERB-UDF and MRF submitted to the Parliament's registry a joint draft amendment to the Constitution.

The draft divides the Supreme Judicial Council into a judges' and prosecutors' college, reduces the powers of the prosecutor-general and declares 24 May—the day of the Bulgarian alphabet—a national holiday. When a caretaker government is formed, the president will choose a caretaker prime minister from among the speaker of the dissolved parliament, the governor of the National Bank or the president of the Supreme Court of Cassation.

In September 2023 a group of opinion leaders, including the former President of Bulgaria Rosen Plevneliev and the ex Minister of Foreign Affairs and president of the Atlantic Club of Bulgaria Solomon Passy, issued a public statement, proposing that Bulgaria's EU and NATO membership be included in the Constitution.

Commenting on the proposal, the parliamentary Constitutional Affairs Committee Chairman Radomir Cholakov (GERB-UDF) said that, no matter how appropriate, it might divert the talks from the main topic of judicial reform.

In contrast, Delyan Peevski (MP of MRF) commented that the Movement for Rights and Freedoms is in favour of and will support these calls between the first and the second reading of the bill. He also mentioned that prior to the second reading, the MRF intends to present a proposal to shorten the Prosecutor General's term from the existing seven years to five years and to limit the tenure to a single term.

On October 6 the bill was voted on but after a debate, which lasted more than 7 hours, it got only 161 votes in favour 57 against. The National Assembly Chair Rosen Zhelyazkov announced that the motion did not gather the necessary 75% to pass at first reading but gathered more than two-thirds. That means that the bill can be tabled again no sooner than two months from October 6 and no later than five months from the same date.

== See also ==
- Tarnovo Constitution (1879)
- Dimitrov Constitution (1947)
- Zhivkov Constitution (1971)
- Rechtsstaat
