= 37th National Assembly of Bulgaria =

1995 legislature in Bulgaria

37th National Assembly 37-мо Народно събрание

History
- Founded: January 12, 1995
- Disbanded: February 13, 1997
- Preceded by: 36th National Assembly
- Succeeded by: 38th National Assembly

Leadership
- Speaker: Blagovest Sendov (BSP)
- Deputy Speakers: Ivan Kurtev; Nora Ananieva; Younal Loutfi; Atanas Zhelezchev; Kristian Krastev

Structure
- Seats: 240
- Political groups: Government (125) BSP (125) Opposition (115) SDS (69) DP—BZNS (18) DPS (15) BBB (13)

Meeting place
- National Assembly Building, Sofia

Website
- parliament.bg

The Thirty-Seventh National Assembly (Bulgarian: Тридесет и седмото народно събрание) was a convocation of the National Assembly of Bulgaria, formed according to the results of the parliamentary elections in Bulgaria held on 18 December 1994.

== History ==
The 37th National Assembly elected the Videnov Government with the absolute majority of the Bulgarian Socialist Party.
The Government would eventually resign after countrywide protests regarding the hyperinflation crisis. The Socialist Party refused to form another government, which resulted in President Petar Stoyanov dissolving the Assembly and calling new elections.
