= House of the National Assembly, Belgrade =

Parliament building in Belgrade, Serbia

House of the National Assembly
- Дом Народне скупштине Dom Narodne skupštine
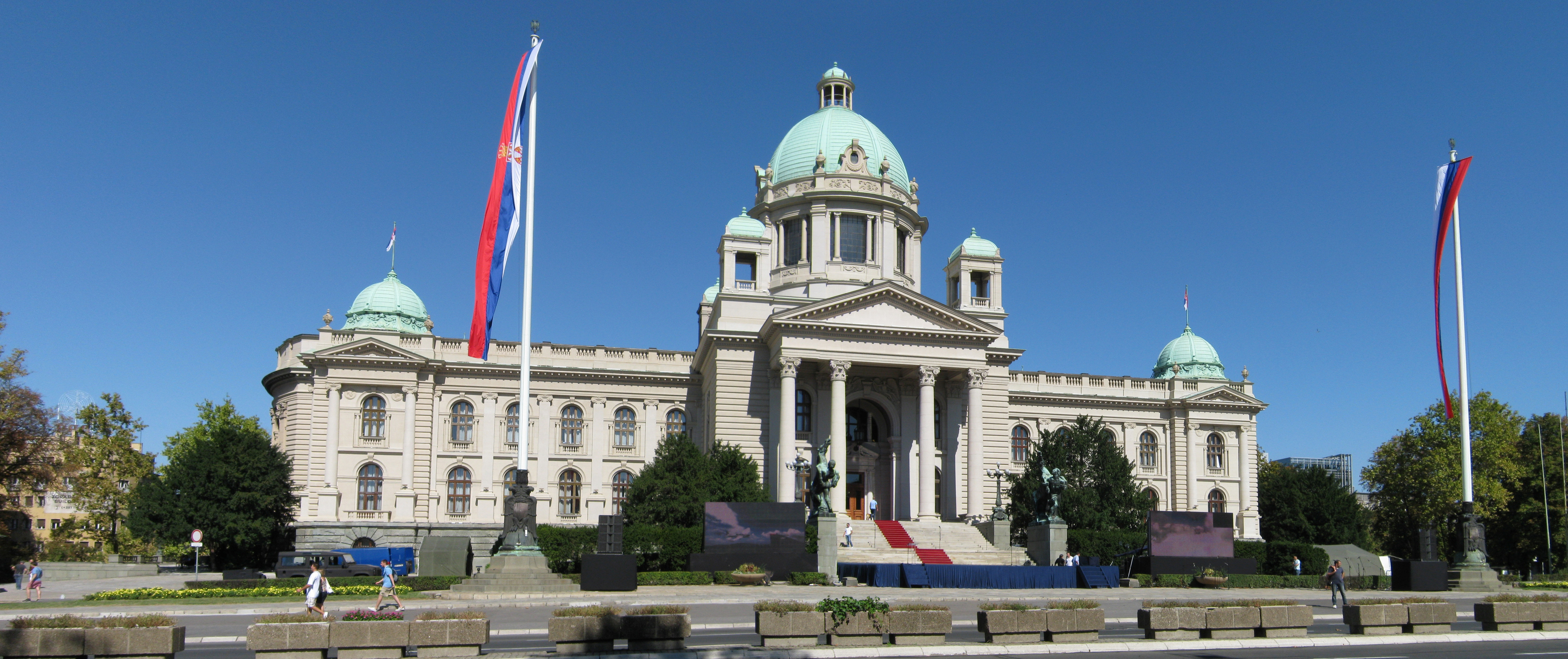

General information
- Architectural style: Renaissance Revival; Baroque Revival
- Location: 13 Nikola Pašić Square, Belgrade, Serbia
- Coordinates: 44°48′42″N 20°27′57″E
- Current tenants: National Assembly
- Groundbreaking: 1907
- Completed: 1936; 90 years ago

Design and construction
- Architect: Konstantin Jovanović

Website
- parlament.rs

The House of the National Assembly (Serbian: Дом Народне скупштине, romanized: Dom Narodne skupštine), formally the House of the National Assembly of the Republic of Serbia (Дом Народне скупштине Републике Србије, Dom Narodne skupštine Republike Srbije), is the seat of the National Assembly of Serbia. The building is located on Nikola Pašić Square in downtown Belgrade, across Novi Dvor (seat of the President of the Republic) and Stari Dvor (Belgrade City Hall). Originally intended to be the House of the National Assembly of the Kingdom of Serbia, it was the seat of the Assembly of Yugoslavia and the Assembly of Serbia and Montenegro. Since 2006 it serves as the meeting place of the National Assembly of Serbia.

== History ==
The old building of the National Assembly was located on the corner of Kraljica Natalija and Knez Miloš streets. This was a modest building, and with the gaining of independence in 1878 and then with the proclamation of the kingdom in 1882, the appearance of this building became unworthy of the parliament of a sovereign state and it was decided to build a new National Assembly building, so the area near the former Batal Mosque was chosen for its location. In the period, area was located on the outskirts of Belgrade.

The first plans for the future legislative building were drawn up by architect Konstantin Jovanović in 1891, who also designed the National Assembly building in Sofia, Bulgaria. Architect Jovan Ilkić won a 1901 design competition, adhering to Jovanović's basic plan.

Construction began on August 27th, 1907, when the building's cornerstone was laid in the presence of King Peter I, Crown Prince George, members of parliament and the diplomatic corps. Its charter, sealed in the cornerstone during the ceremony, bore the names of the king, the metropolitan, and chief architect Jovan Ilkić. Construction lasted until 1936, interrupted by the Balkan Wars, World War I, and the Great Depression. The first floor completed before the outbreak of the World War I. Original project of Jovan Ilkić was slightly revised because of the formation of the Kingdom of Yugoslavia since its constitution mandated a bicameral (instead of unicameral) legislature. After Ilkić's death in 1917 his son, Ministry of Construction architect Pavle Ilkić, led the project. His duties included making the required changes and completing the original design. Construction continued from 1920 to 1926, when it was again suspended. A decision about the next phase was made after the assassination of King Alexander I in 1934. Its interior, completed in 1938, was designed by Russian architect Nikolay Krasnov who designed every detail: chandeliers, lamps, handles, windows, and furniture. The House of the National Assembly was dedicated on 18 October 1936 in the presence of King Peter II, after 29 years of construction. The first plenary session of the parliament was held two days later, and by the end of the year the building was fully completed. A sculpture by Toma Rosandić, Igrali se konji vrani (Play by Black Horses), was installed in front of the building in 1939.

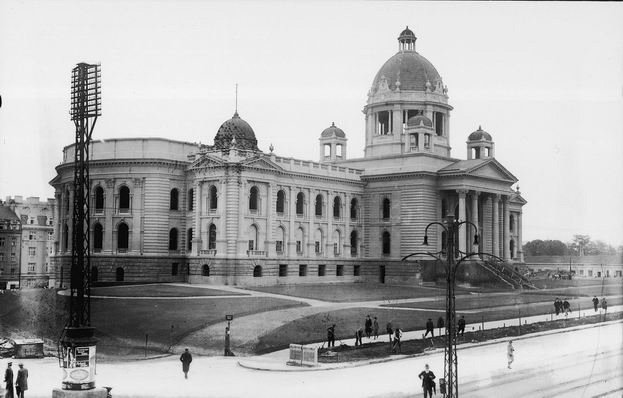
House of the National Assembly in the late 1930s

After the 1941 invasion of Yugoslavia and during World War II, the building housed the German high command for Southeastern Europe. After the World War II, building was used as a meeting place of the Federal Assembly of Yugoslavia.

Because of its architectural, cultural, historical and artistic value, the National Assembly Building was declared a cultural monument in 1984. The building was damaged during the demonstrations on 5 October 2000 when some 91 pieces of art were stolen; thirty-five have been found, but 56 remain missing. The building itself was also damaged but was fixed. The House of the National Assembly was featured in the 2011 film, Coriolanus.

== Architecture ==
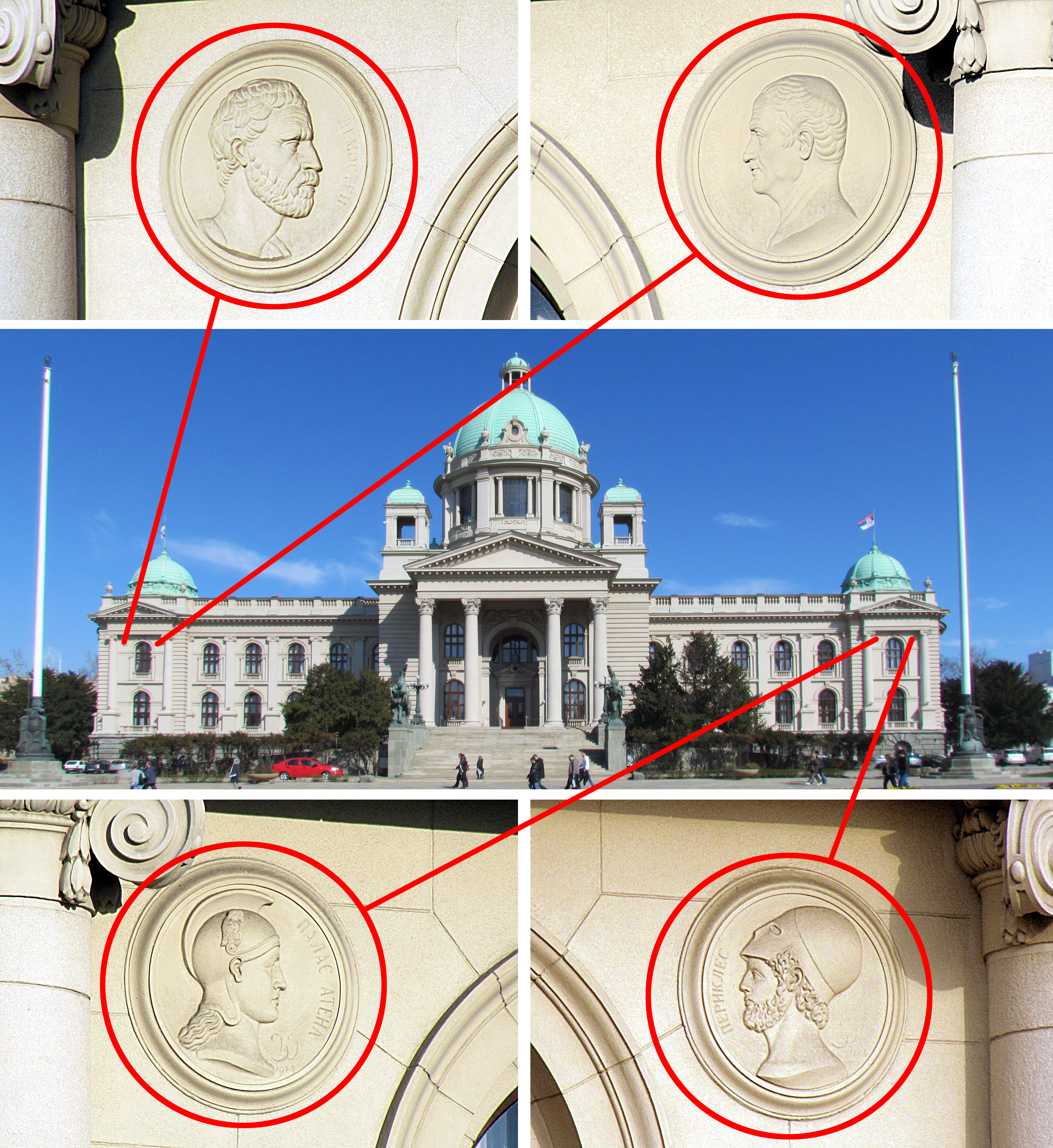
Facade medallions (from left: Demosthenes, Cicero, Athena, and Pericles

Covering about 13,400 m^{2} (144,000 sq ft), building is designed in neo-baroque and has four storeys: a basement, ground floor, first floor, and attic, with mezzanines below the basement, between the basement and the ground floor and between the ground and first floors.

The building's central risalit is dominated by a portico with a triangular tympanum, above which is a dome with a lantern at the top. Its external design (with rustic green stone from Ripanj for the basement), and the shape of windows and pilasters extending through the two central levels and ending in a roof cornice with balustrade, indicate neo-Renaissance and neo-Baroque models. The only plastic ornaments are medallions with images of Pericles, Athena, Demosthenes and Cicero, by sculptor Đorđe Jovanović, on the lateral risalits. A sculpture above the portals of an angel with a torch and an olive branch was designed by sculptor Petar Palavičini. A 1937 fence with decorative candelabras and two guardrooms with stylized lanterns on top was designed by Krasnov; the fence stood until 1956, when it was removed.

Interior design includes some 100 offices, large and small halls, and four conference rooms, a central vestibule topped by a dome, polychrome walls with columns, pilasters, niches and loggias, and a marble floor. The 165-square-metre (1,780 sq ft) library, on the first floor, contains over 60,000 books. The building is decorated with 23 frescoes and a number of paintings, sculptures, and other fine artwork.

== Gallery ==
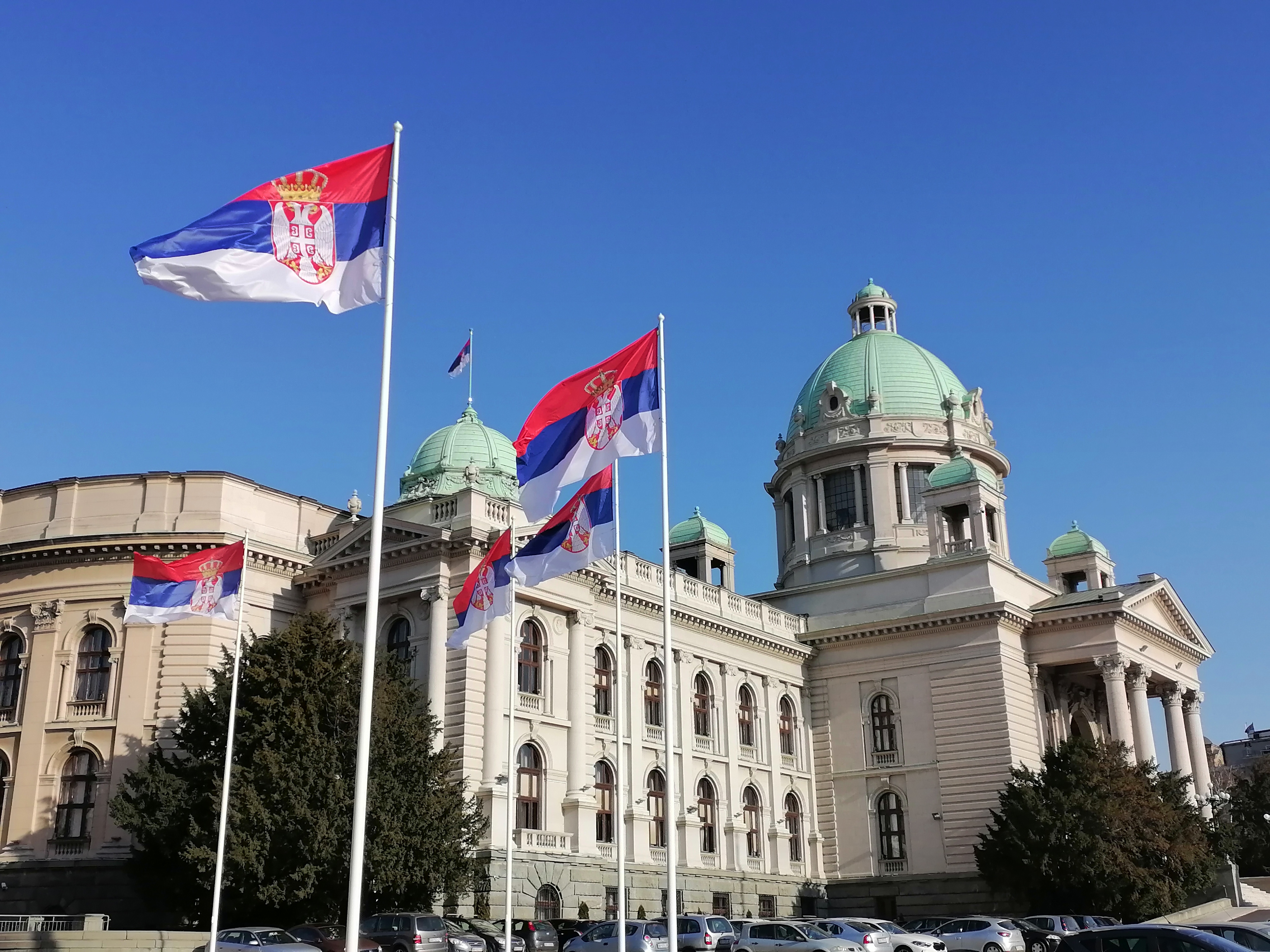
Main façade (north view)

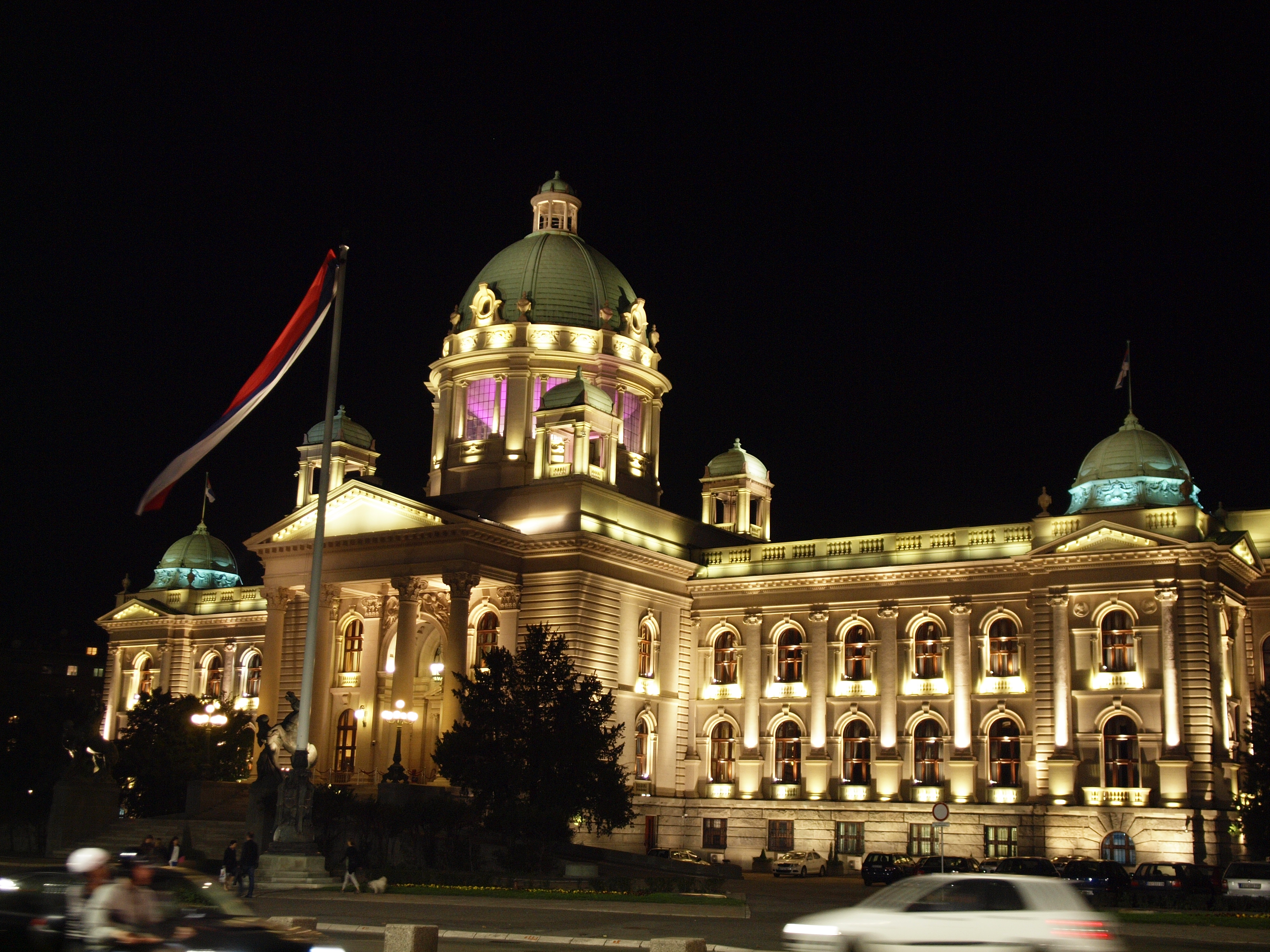
Main facade at night

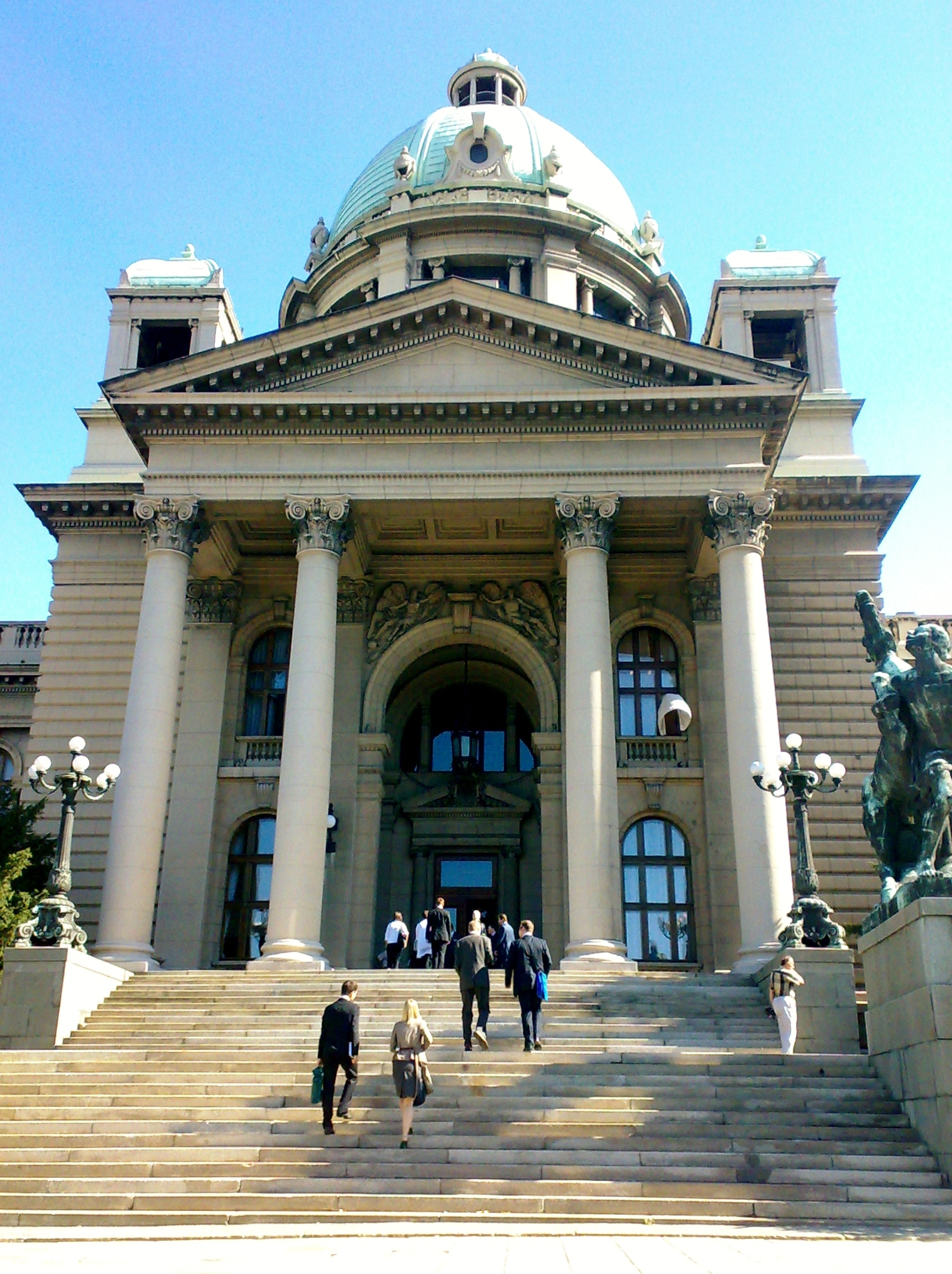
Main entrance

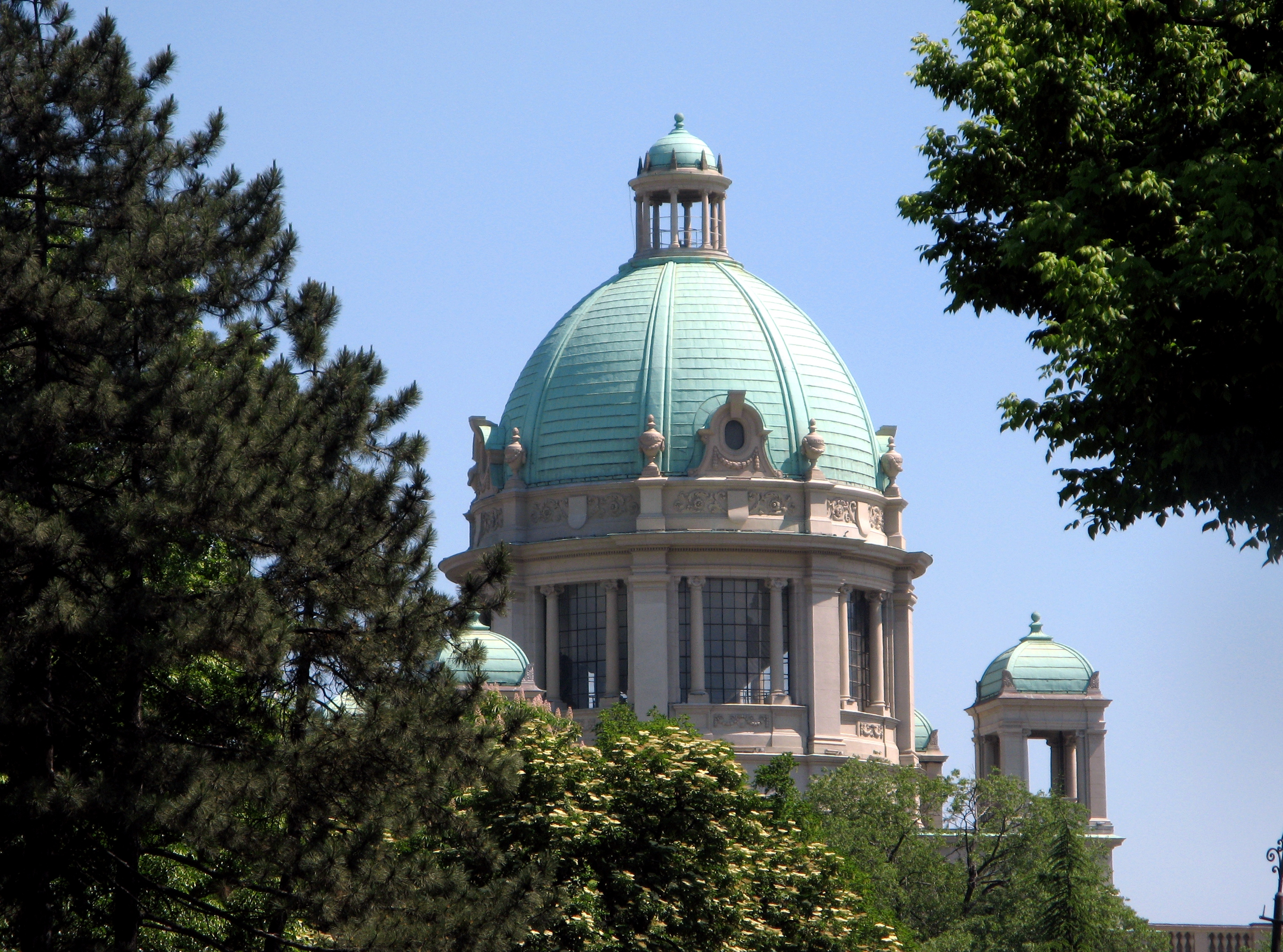
Dome

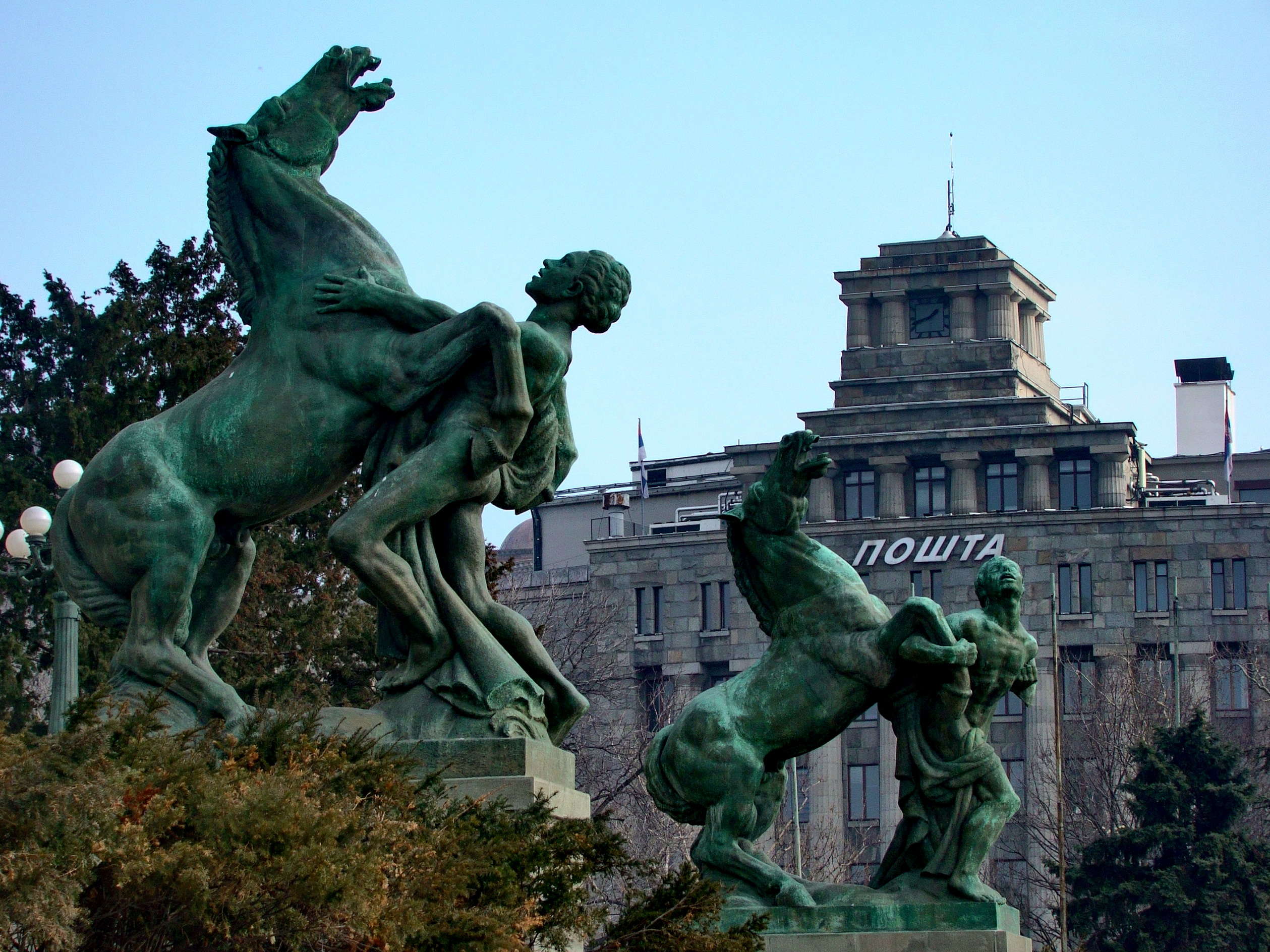
Play of Black Horses, sculpture in front of the main entrance
The Great Chamber

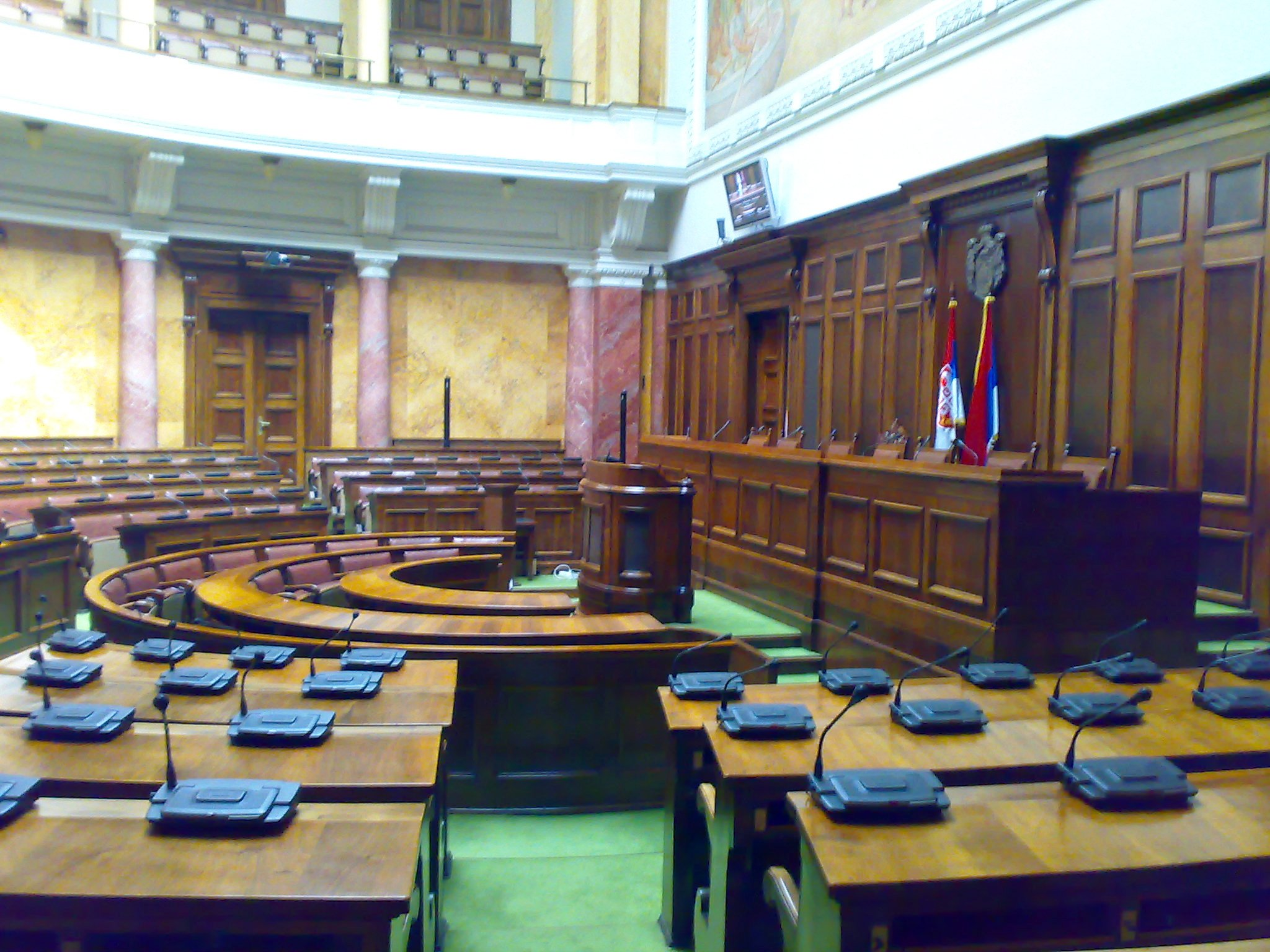
The Small Chamber

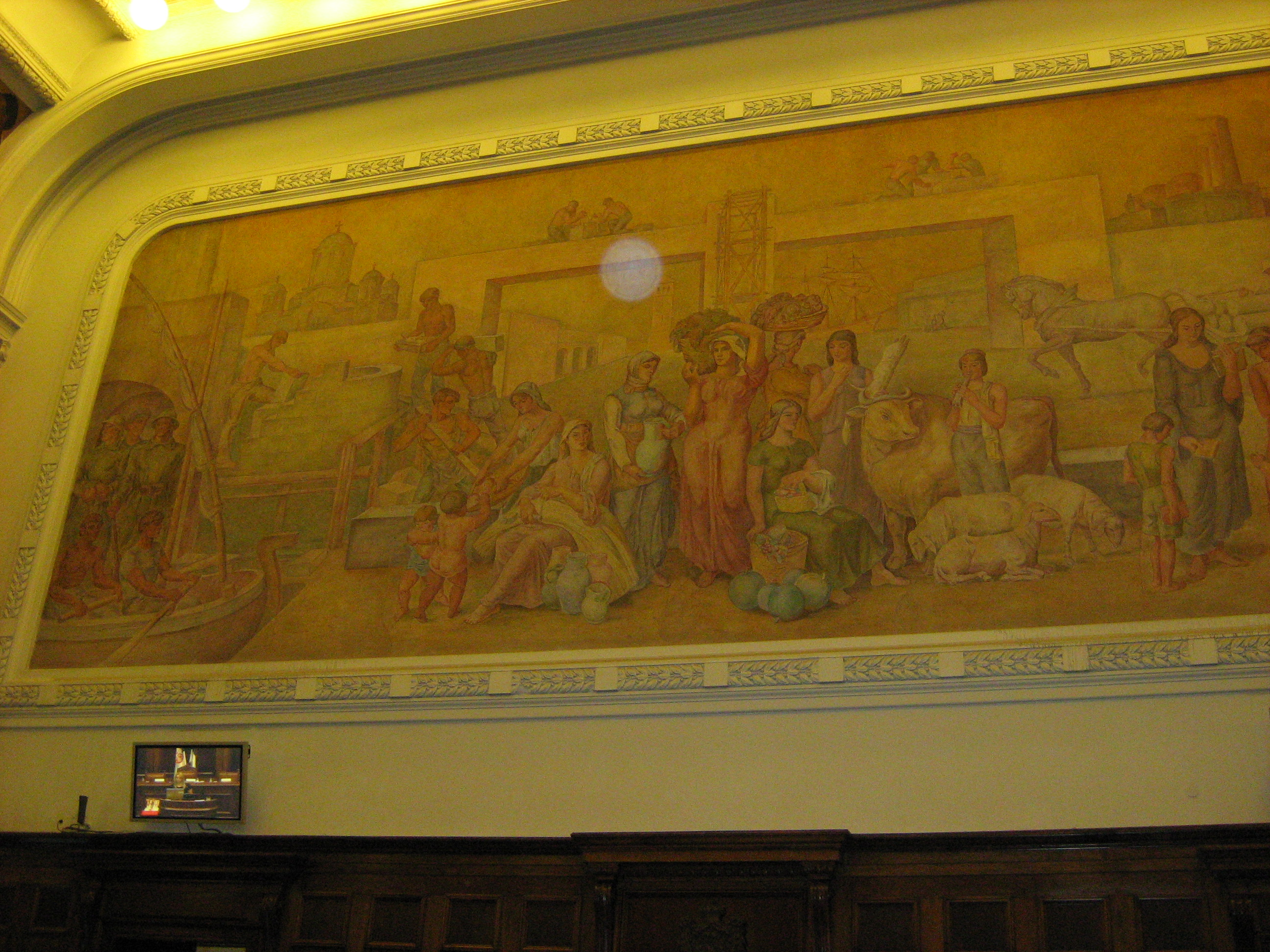
Fresco in Small Chamber

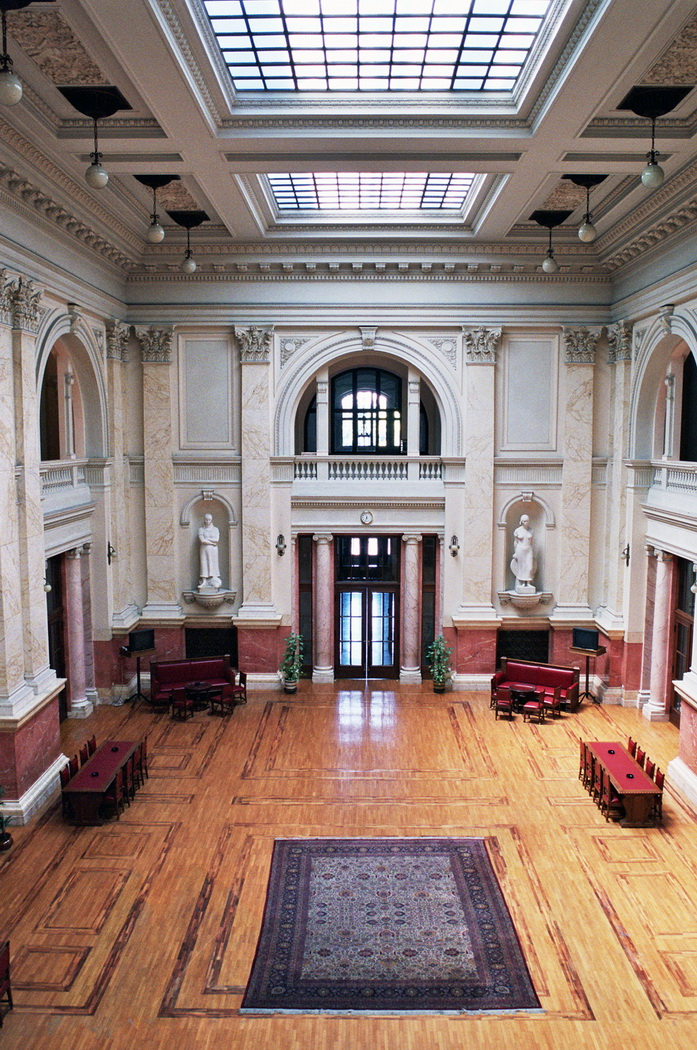
Great Hall

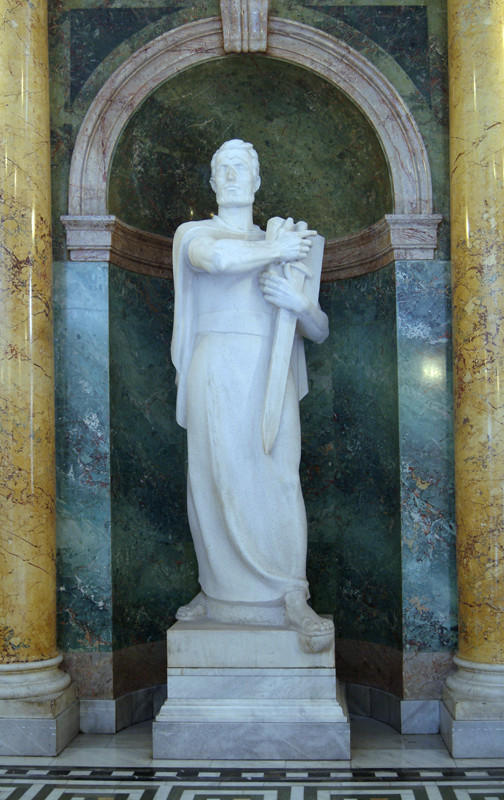
Statue of Prince Kocel

== See also ==
- List of buildings in Belgrade
- Novi Dvor
- Banovina Palace
