= 36th National Assembly of Bulgaria =

1991 legislature in Bulgaria

36th National Assembly 36-то Народно събрание

History
- Founded: November 4, 1991
- Disbanded: October 17, 1994
- Preceded by: 7th Grand National Assembly
- Succeeded by: 37th National Assembly

Leadership
- Speaker: Stefan Savov (SDS) (Note: From 4 November 1991 to 24 September 1992); Aleksandar Yordanov (SDS) (Note: From 5 October 1992 to 17 October 1994)
- Deputy Speakers: Stanimira Botusharova; Kadir Kadir

Structure
- Seats: 240
- Political groups: Government (110) (Note: Until December 30, 1992) SDS (110) Confidence and supply (24) DPS (24) Opposition (106) BSP (106)
- Political groups: Government (24) (Note: After December 30, 1992) DPS (24) Confidence and supply (106) BSP (106) Opposition (110) SDS (110) (Note: A small faction of the deeply fragmented parliamentary group supported the government)

Meeting place
- National Assembly Building, Sofia

Website
- parliament.bg

The Thirty-Sixth National Assembly (Bulgarian: Тридесет и шестото народно събрание) was a convocation of the National Assembly of Bulgaria, formed according to the results of the parliamentary elections in Bulgaria held on 13 October 1991.

== History ==
The 36th National Assembly initially elected the Dimitrov Government, led by the Union of Democratic Forces and supported by the Movement for Rights and Freedoms. However, the latter eventually withdrew its support for the government and, following a failed vote of confidence, the government collapsed.
After the fall of the Dimitrov Government, the parties engaged in coalition talks once again. Eventually, the DPS-nominated candidate, Independent Lyuben Berov, was elected by a majority in the National Assembly in December 1992. His proposed government was technocratic, excluding party members of the cabinet. Berov resigned in the fall of 1994, following a failure to deliver necessary reforms, economic decline and rising crime rates.
After the fall of the Berov Government, the parties refused to engage in government talks once again, which led to the dissolution of the Assembly on October 17, 1994 and the 1994 election.
