= 38th National Assembly of Bulgaria =

1997 legislature in Bulgaria

38th National Assembly 38-то Народно събрание

History
- Founded: May 7, 1997
- Disbanded: April 19, 2001
- Preceded by: 37th National Assembly
- Succeeded by: 39th National Assembly

Leadership
- Speaker: Yordan Sokolov (ODS)
- Deputy Speakers: Blagovest Sendov; Ivan Kurtev; Lyuben Kornezov; Petya Shopova; Aleksandar Dzherov; Hristo Stoyanov

Structure
- Seats: 240
- Political groups: Government (137) ODS (137) Opposition (103) BSP (58) DPS (19) BEL (14) BBB (12)

Meeting place
- National Assembly Building, Sofia

Website
- parliament.bg

The Thirty-Eight National Assembly (Bulgarian: Тридесет и осмото народно събрание) was a convocation of the National Assembly of Bulgaria, formed according to the results of the parliamentary elections in Bulgaria, held on 19 April 1997.

== History ==
The 38th National Assembly elected the Kostov Government, headed by the former Minister of Finance Ivan Kostov with his party's comfortable absolute majority in the National Assembly.
