= Bombing of Bulgaria in World War II =

- Part of Bulgaria during World War II
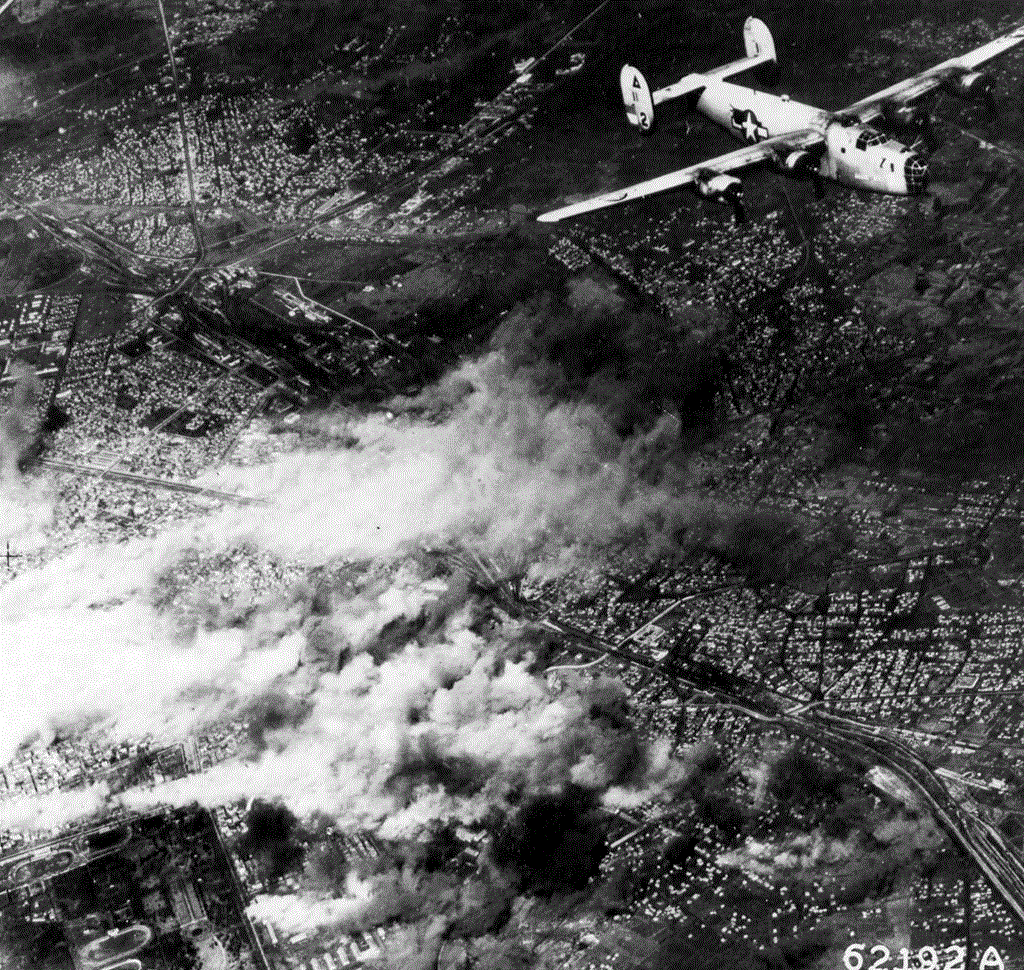
- Bombing of Sofia, April 1944
Date	April 1941; November 1943 – April 1944
Location	Kingdom of Bulgaria

Belligerents
United Kingdom; United States; Yugoslavia (1941); Greece (1941)	Bulgaria

Commanders and leaders
(United Kingdom) John Simpson (United States) Jimmy Doolittle	(Tsardom of Bulgaria (1908–1946)) Dimitar Ayranov (Tsardom of Bulgaria (1908–1946)) Vasil Valkov

Strength
2,387–2,500 aircraft	150–200 aircraft 11 heavy air defense batteries

Casualties and losses
Military ranks: 256 killed (159 in battle, 28 missing, 69 died of their wounds); 333 captured; unspecified number of wounded Airplanes shot down: 185 bombers and fighters Unspecified number damaged aircraft	Military ranks: 23 killed in battle (22 Bulgarians, 1 German); Civilian population, etc.: 3,950 killed, wounded or missing; 4,744 wounded Damaged buildings: 12,657; Planes down: 27; Unspecified number of damaged aircraft

Bulgaria suffered a series of Allied bombing raids during World War II, from mid 1941 to early 1944. Bulgaria declared war on the United Kingdom and the United States on 13 December 1941. The Southern Italy-based Allied air forces extended the range of their strategic operations to include Bulgaria and other Axis allies in 1943.

== Raids ==
=== April 1941 ===
During the invasions of Yugoslavia and of Greece, the Yugoslav and British air forces targeted strategic points in Bulgaria, from which German troops had staged the invasions.

On 6 April, Yugoslav Dornier Do 17 aircraft bombed the industrial section of Sofia and Kyustendil. In Sofia, eight people were killed. In the bombing of Kyustendil 58 civilians, two Bulgarian and eight German soldiers were killed and 59 civilians, five Bulgarian and 31 German soldiers were wounded.

Between 20:05 and 21:40 on 6 April, the Royal Air Force (RAF) carried out bombing raids over Bulgaria. Bristol Blenheim aircraft bombed Petrich and Haskovo and six Vickers Wellington bombers dropped bombs over Sofia and nearby villages. During the bombing of the capital, 14 buildings were destroyed and three fires were started. Sofia was bombed a second time on 13 April, provoking a large exodus.

=== 18 October 1943 ===
On October 18, 1943, the city of Skopje, then within the borders of the Kingdom of Bulgaria, was bombed. At 12:15 p.m., 24 Wellington light bombers and R-38 Lightning fighters attacked the Skopje railway station. 40 buildings were destroyed, 30 people were killed, and 23 were wounded. The same day, the city of Veles and the Veles railway station were attacked. Two people were killed and one person was wounded. At 4:22 p.m., the Skopje railway station was attacked again, killing three and wounding 15 soldiers. One enemy fighter was shot down. The Skopje General Zhostov railway station was also bombed.

=== 14 November 1943 ===
This day, Sofia suffered an air raid carried out by 91 B-25 Mitchell bombers. Forty-seven buildings and structures were destroyed, 59 military personnel were killed and over 128 were injured.

=== 24 November 1943 ===
A new bombing of the capital followed on 24 November, this time executed by 60 B-24 Liberator aircraft. 87 buildings in the vicinity of the Central Railway Station were destroyed, with 29 people being wounded. Bulgarian fighters shot down two bombers for the loss of one aircraft to escorting American fighters.

=== 10 December 1943 ===
The 10 December raid was carried out by 120 aircraft. About 90 bombs were released over the Hadzhi Dimitar, Industrialen, Malashevtsi and Voenna rampa quarters of Sofia, another 90 hit Vrazhdebna Airport and the nearby villages.

=== 20 December 1943 ===
One of the most destructive raids over the capital followed on 20 December, with over 113 buildings being razed to the ground, the belt line being cut off, with 93 people injured. Bulgarian fighter aircraft downed three bombers and seven fighters for the loss of two aircraft, including one destroyed in a suicidal ramming attack by Dimitar Spisarevski which brought down a bomber.

=== 30 December 1943 ===
A day bombing in the Sofia railway junction area was executed on 30 December 1943, injuring 96.

=== 10 January 1944 ===
Sofia suffered another bombing on 10 January 1944, carried out consecutively by 143 American B-17s during the day and 44 RAF Wellingtons (during the night). 448 buildings were destroyed. 611 were wounded. During the daylight raid by the B-17s, Bulgarian fighters shot down six of the bombers and three escorting P-38 fighters for the loss of one aircraft.

=== 16 March 1944 ===
During the night 50 RAF bombers attacked Sofia. 58 people were wounded and 72 buildings were destroyed.

=== 24 March 1944 ===
During the night about 40 RAF bombers attacked Sofia. There were no casualties.

=== 30 March 1944 ===
The most severe bombing of Sofia ever occurred on 30 March 1944. Some 450 American and British heavy bombers escorted by 150 Allied fighters attacked the city center of Sofia, destroying 3575 buildings. Over 3000 high explosive bombs and 30000 incendiary bombs were used. Bulgarian fighter aircraft intercepted the attackers, shooting down eight Allied bombers and two American P-38 Lightning fighters for no losses in return. The casualty figures were relatively modest due to preliminary evacuation of the civilians. The bombing raid targeted the city center of Sofia.

=== 17 April 1944 ===
This bombing is known as "the black Easter" (the second day of Easter) for the citizens of Sofia. The raid was carried out by 350 bombers (B-17 and B-24) with an escort of 100 fighter planes –Mustangs and Lightnings. About 2500 bombs were dropped over the target – railroad marshaling yards. 749 buildings were totally destroyed. Casualties were 69 people wounded.

== Consequences ==
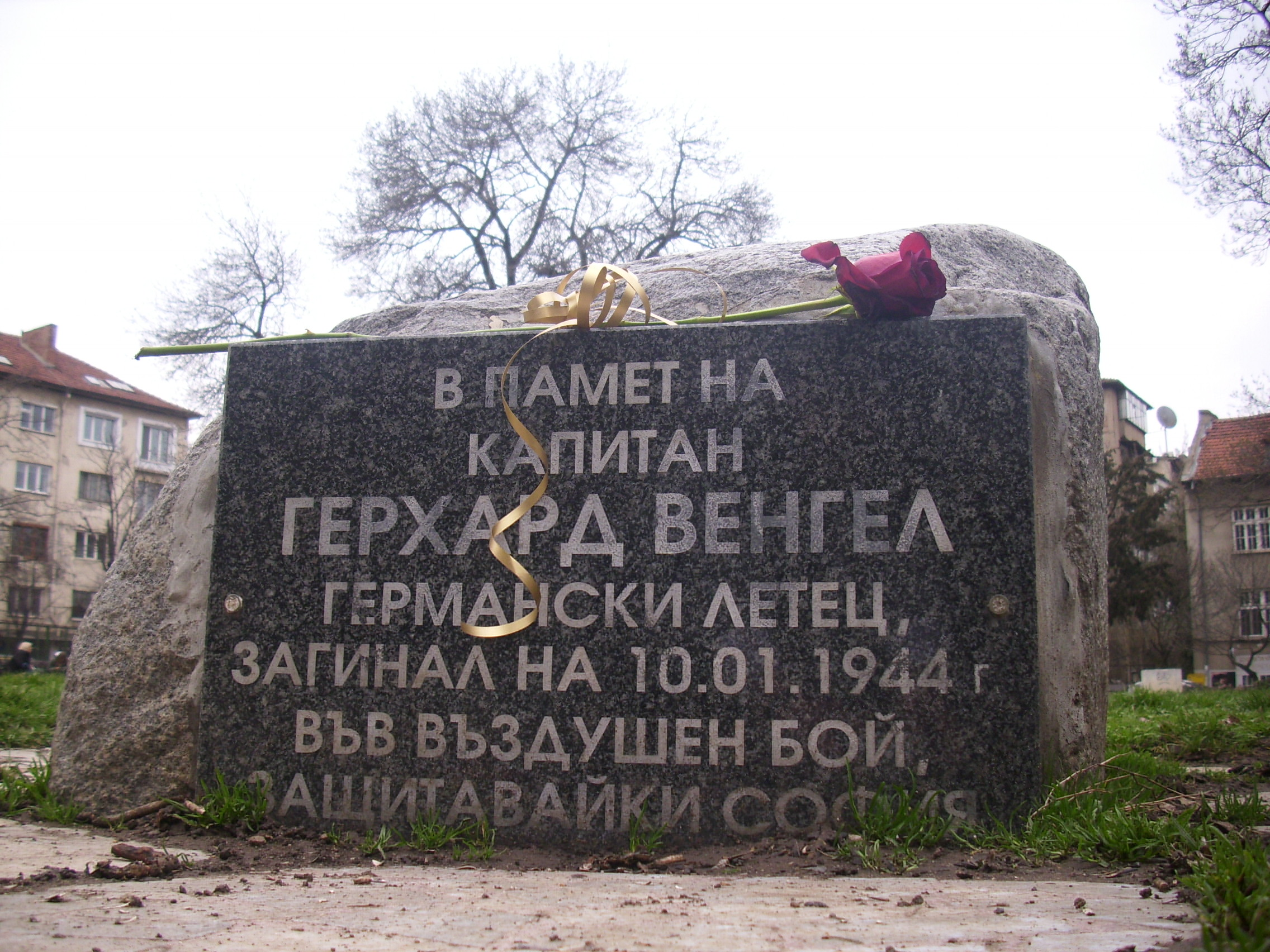
Gerhard Wengel memorial in Sofia, Bulgaria

The bombing raids in 1943–1944 resulted in 1,743 being injured. The number of buildings damaged were 12,564 (of which 2,670 completely destroyed). Sixty motor cars and 55 trailers were also destroyed. The Allies lost a total of 117 aircraft.

Among the historic buildings destroyed were several schools and hotels, as well as the State Printing House, the Regional Court, the Small Baths and the National Library. These were not restored to their original appearance. The Bulgarian National Theatre, the Bulgarian Agricultural Bank, the Theological Faculty of Sofia University, the Museum of Natural History, the Bulgarian Academy of Sciences and other buildings were damaged but subsequently reconstructed.

Captain Gerhard Wengel (1915–1944) was a German Luftwaffe pilot (kommandeur I/JG 5) who was killed in the sky over Radomir, while defending Sofia. He was the only foreign pilot killed in battle while defending Bulgarian airspace during World War II. He was part of the Jagdgeschwader 5 "Eismeer" fighter wing.

== Destructions ==
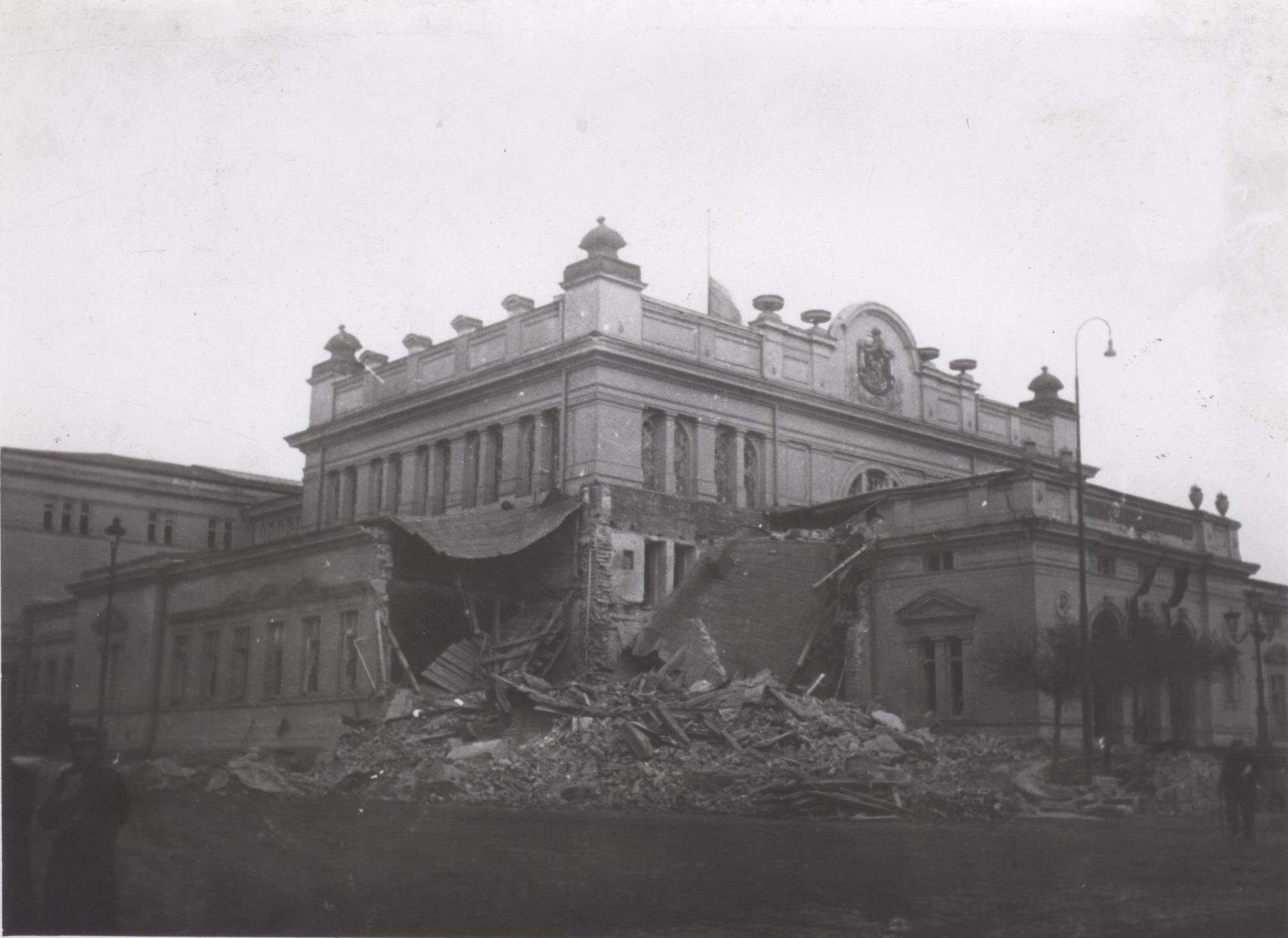
The damaged National Assembly building.

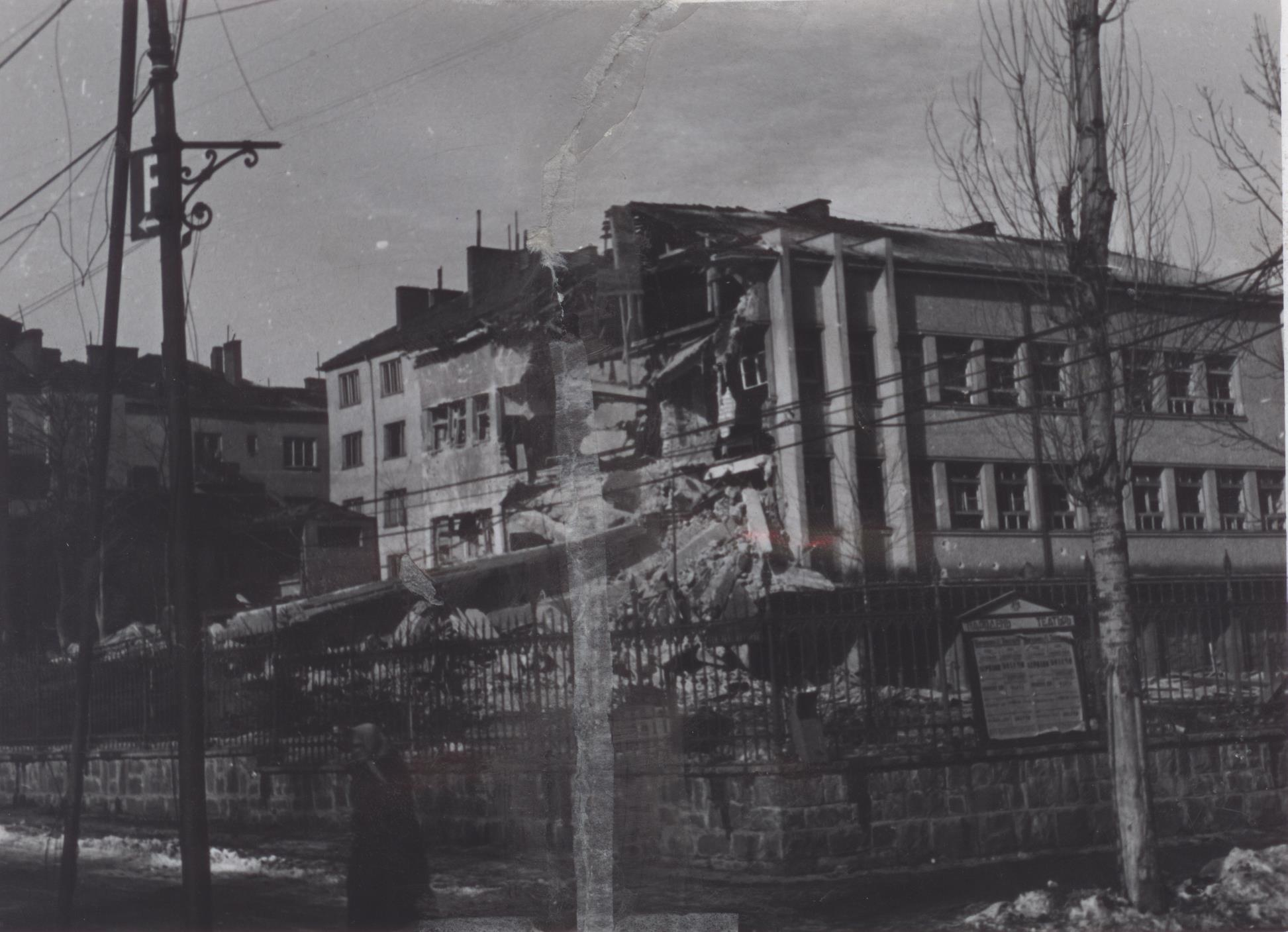
Seven Bulgarian saints school.

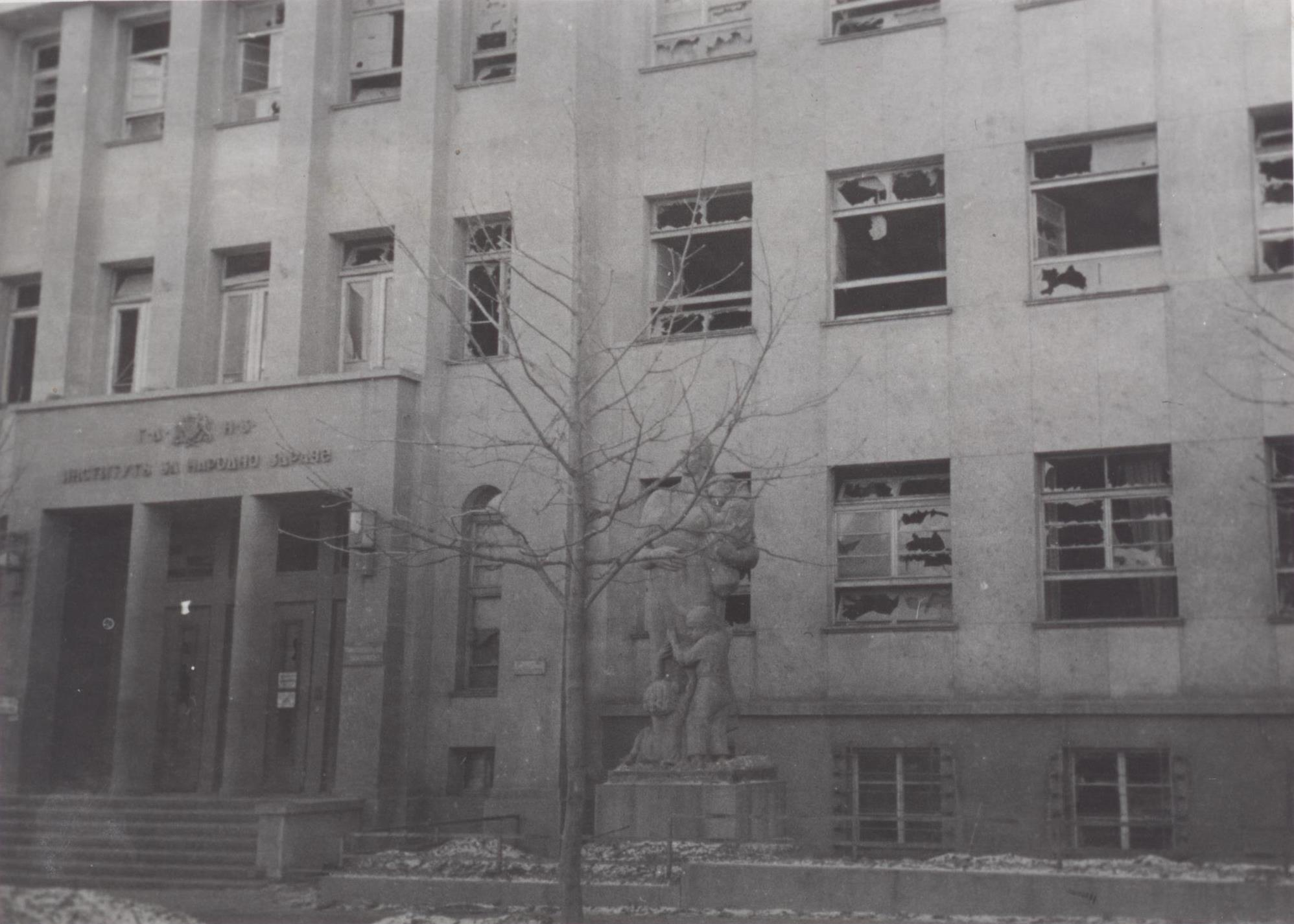
The Public Health Institute.

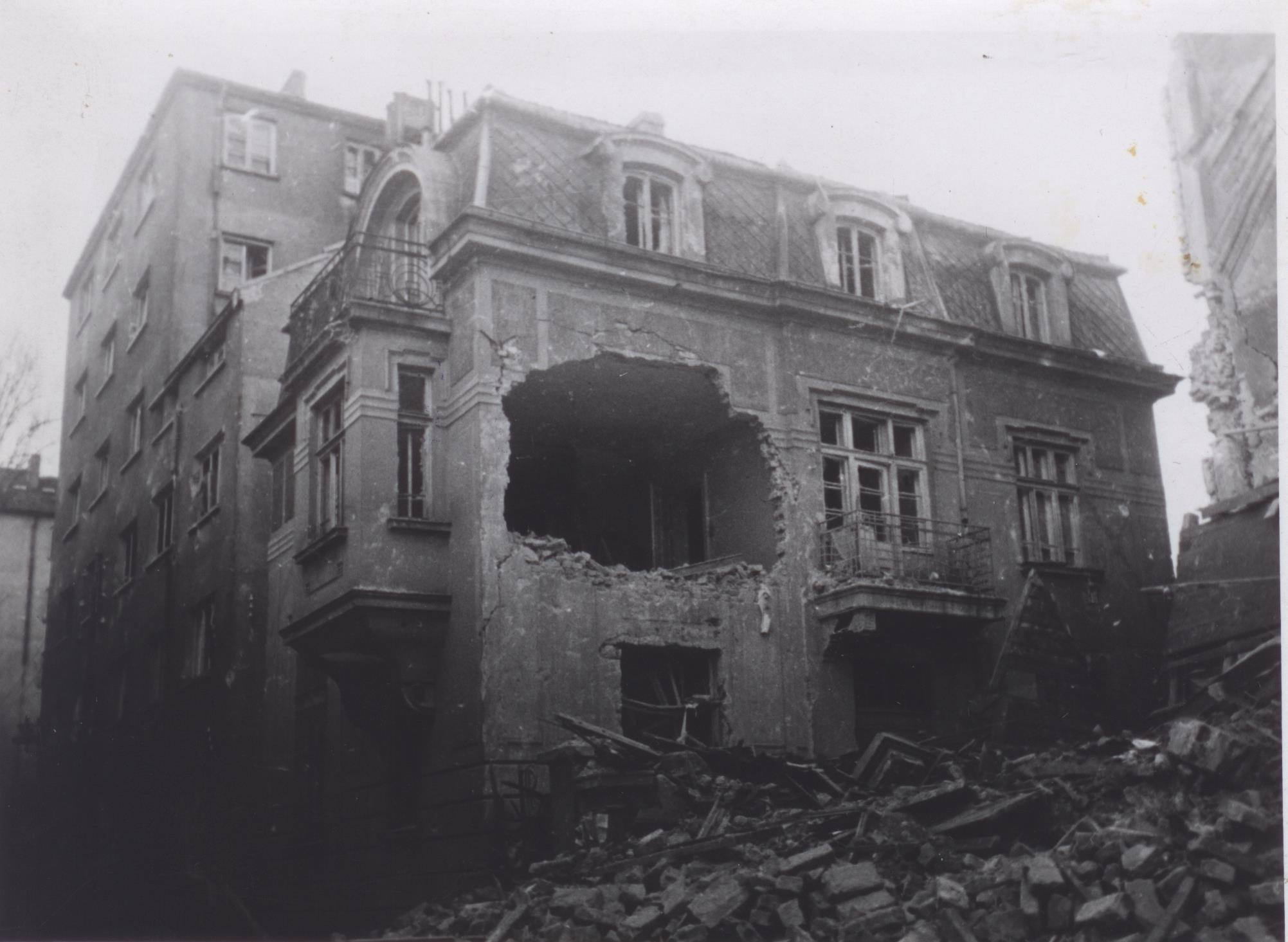
Destroyed building on Ferdinand blvd.

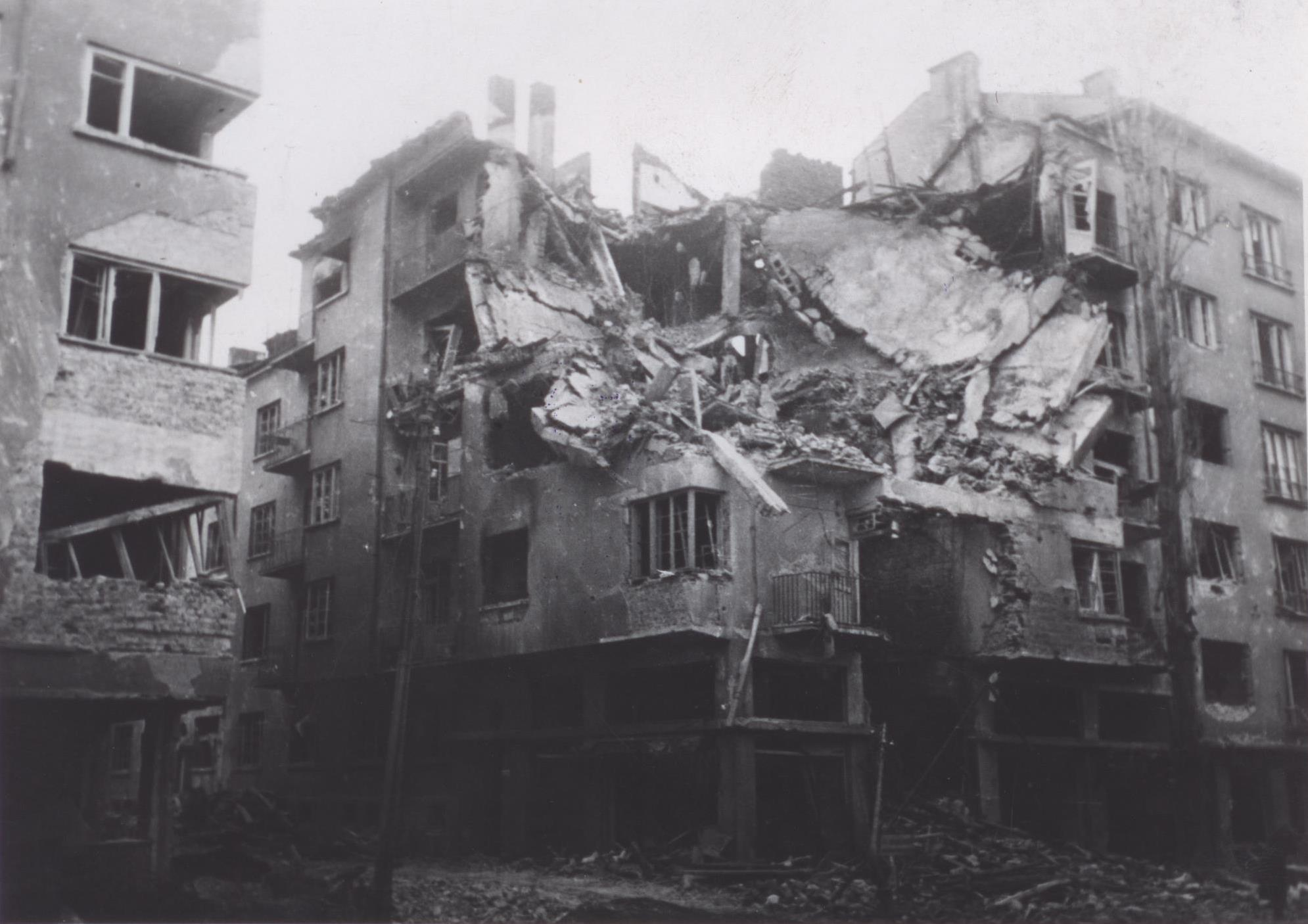
Destroyed building on Ferdinand blvd.

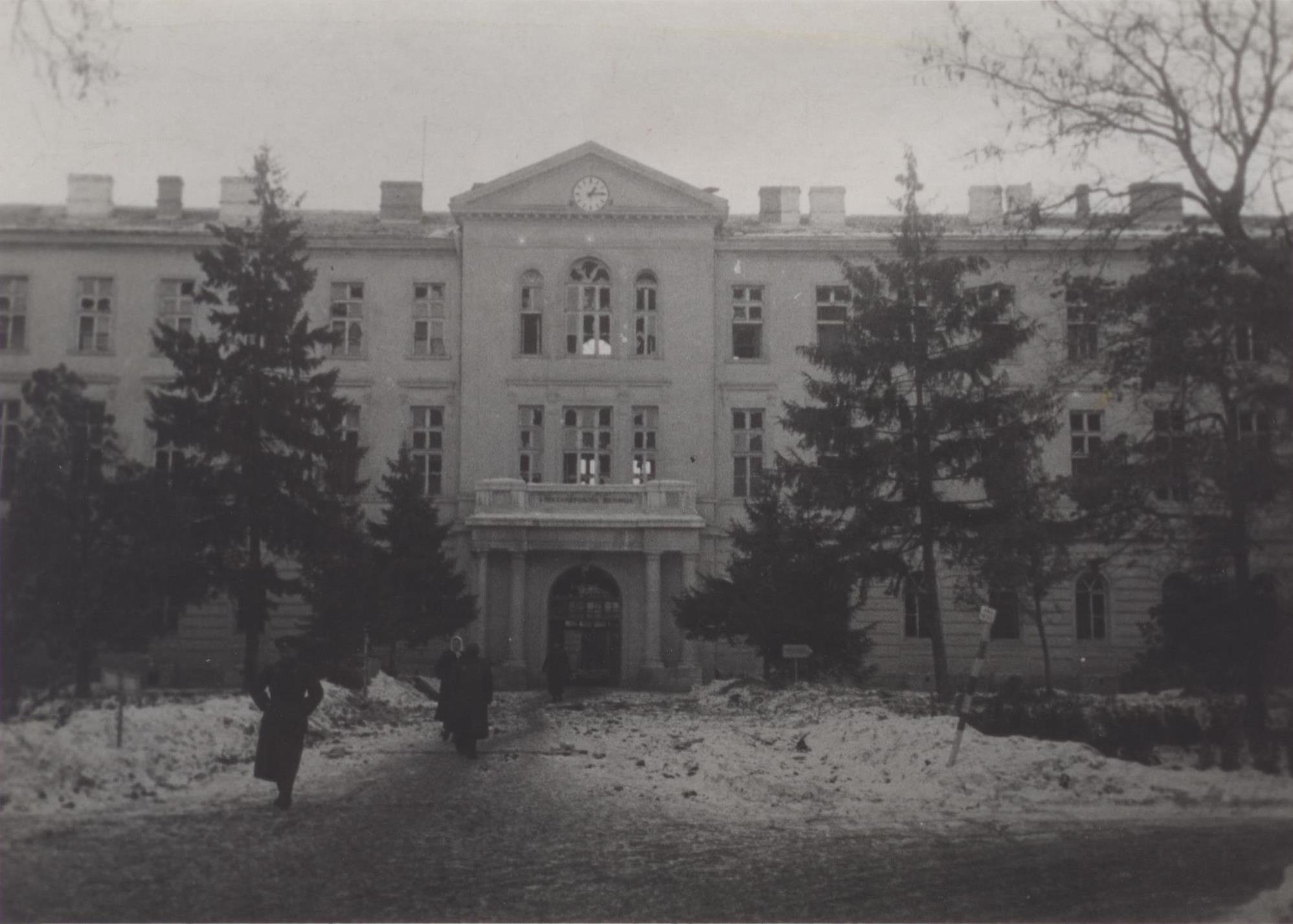
Aleksandrovska University Hospital.

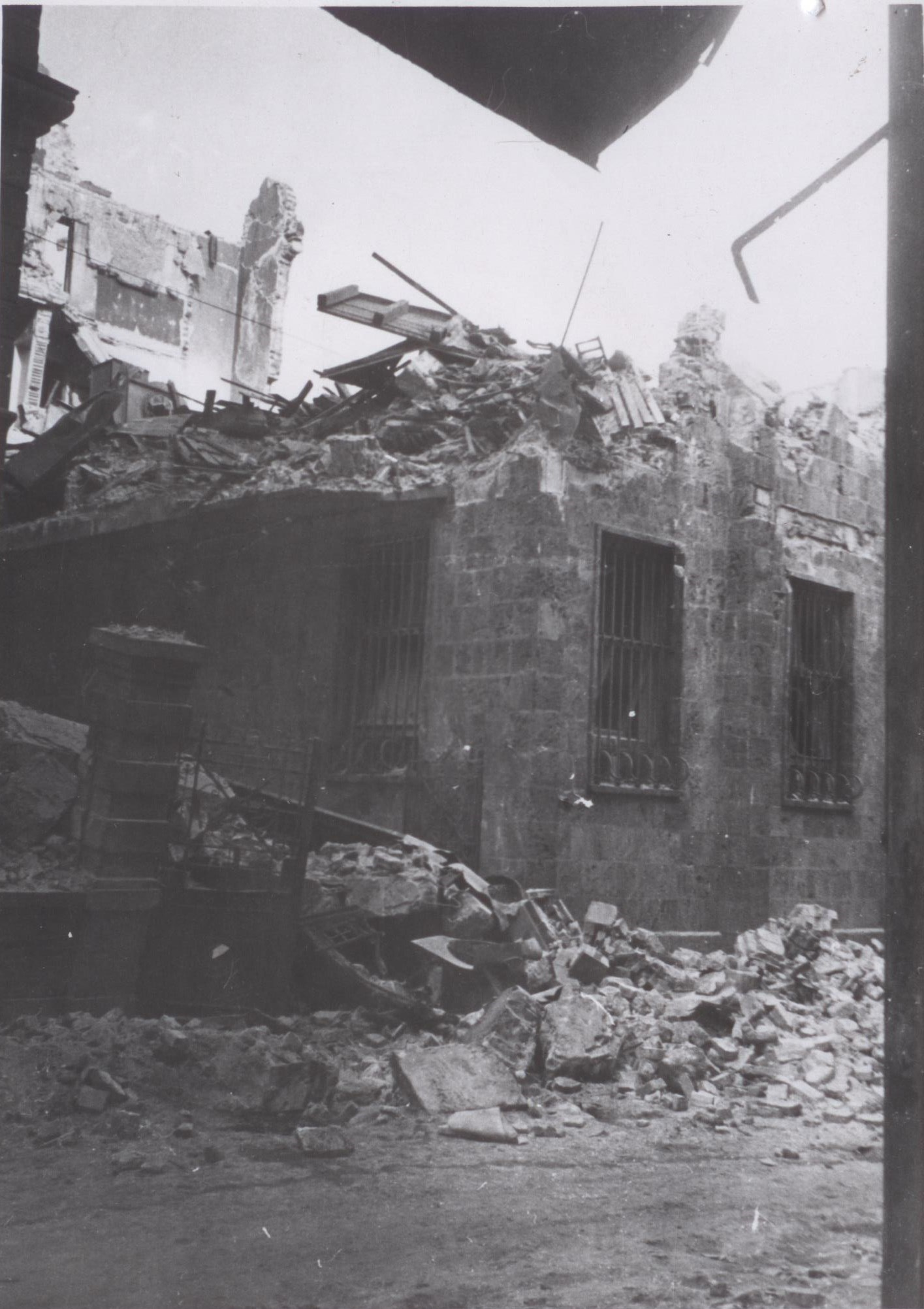
Sofia eparchy building.

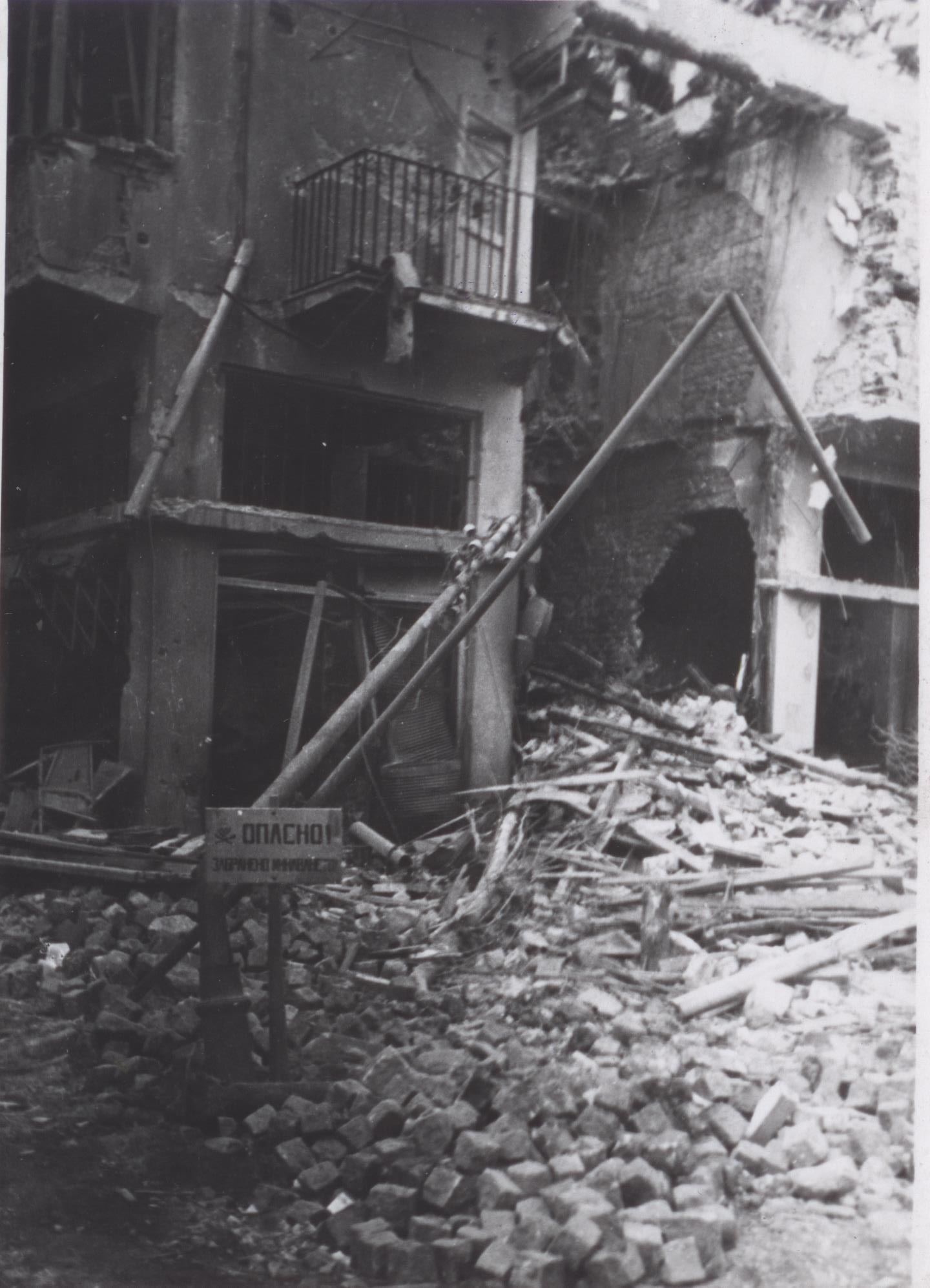
Destroyed building on Ferdinand blvd.

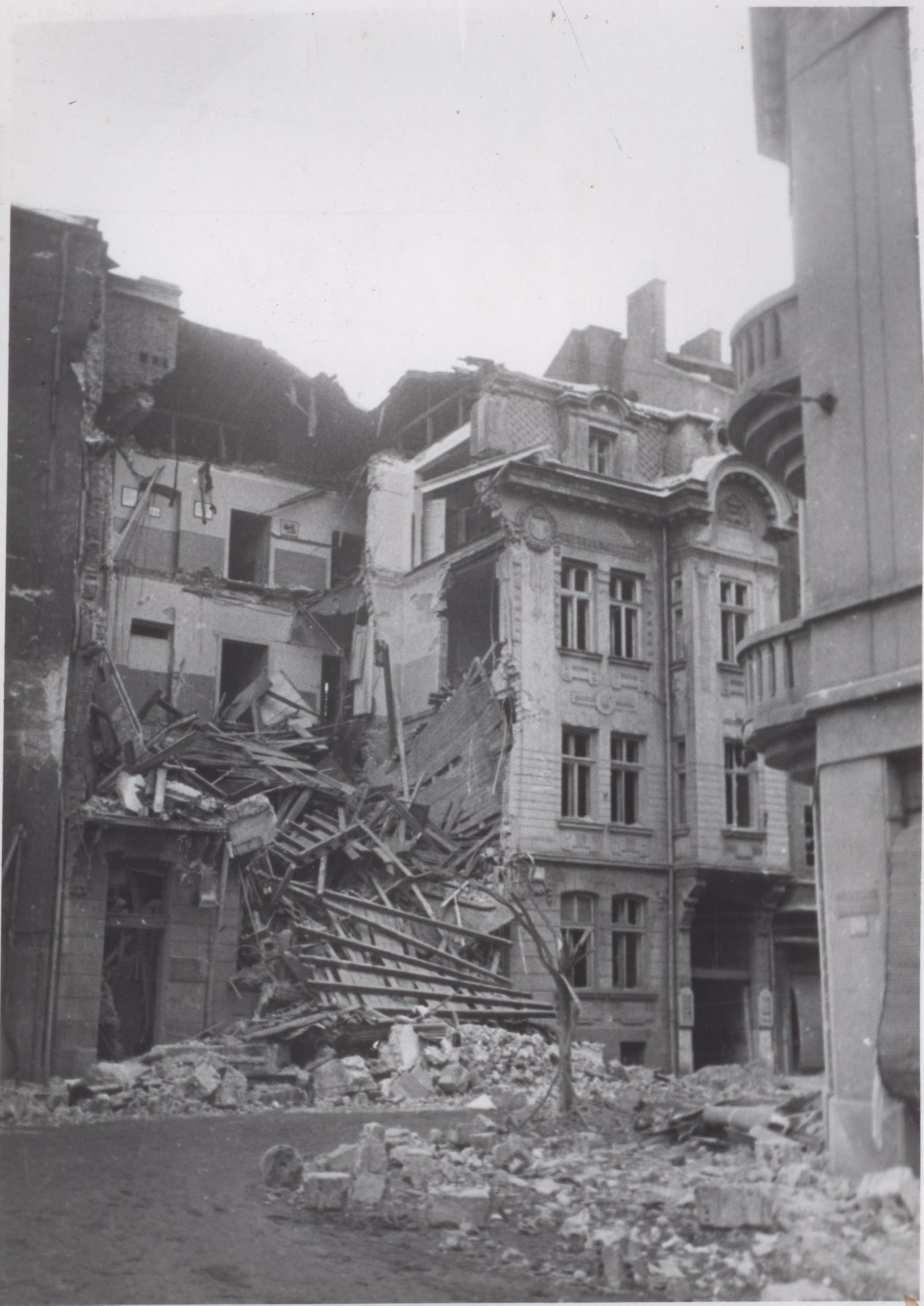
The Italian school

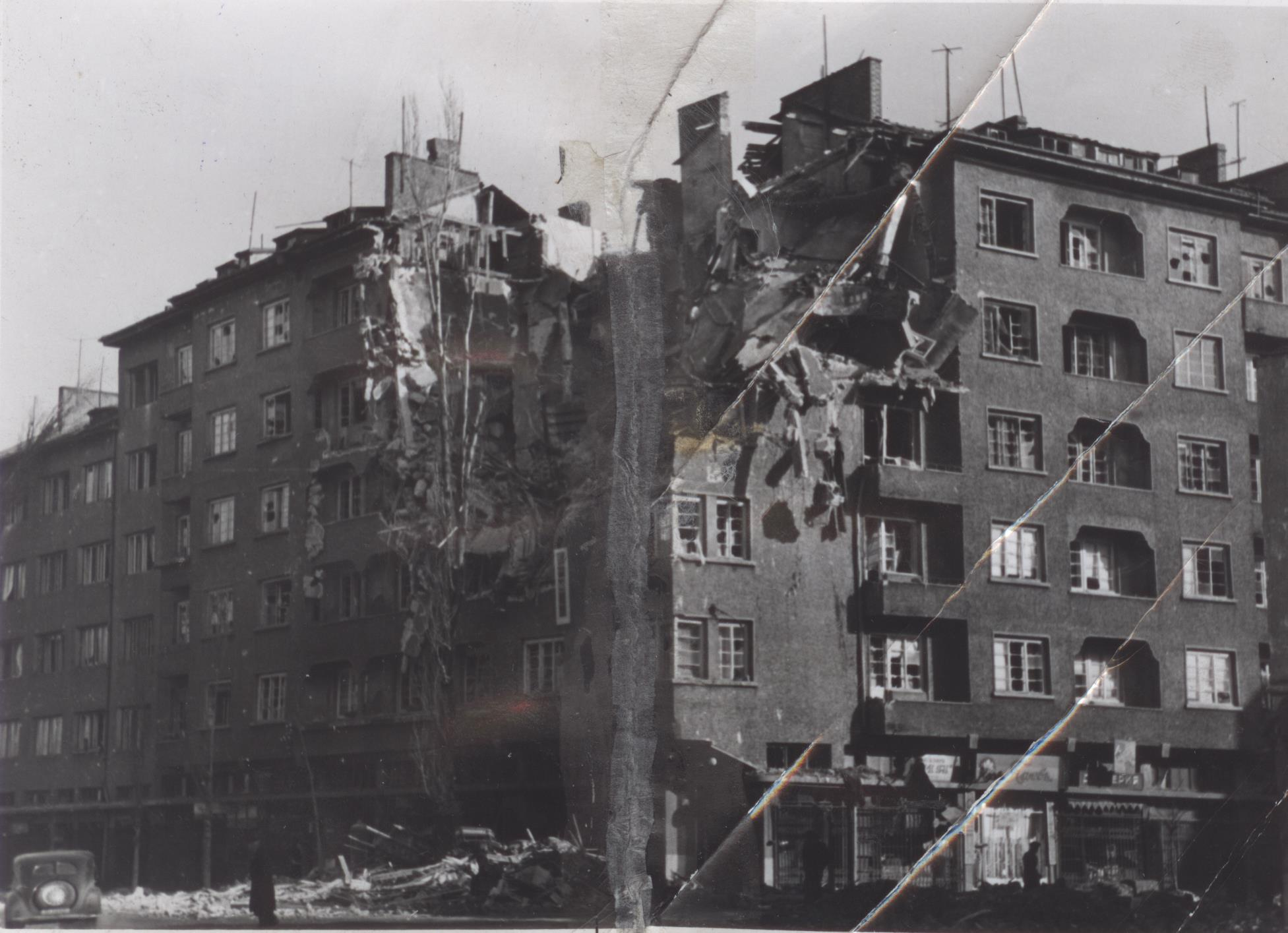
At the crossroad of Graf Ignatiev str and. Ferdinand blvd.

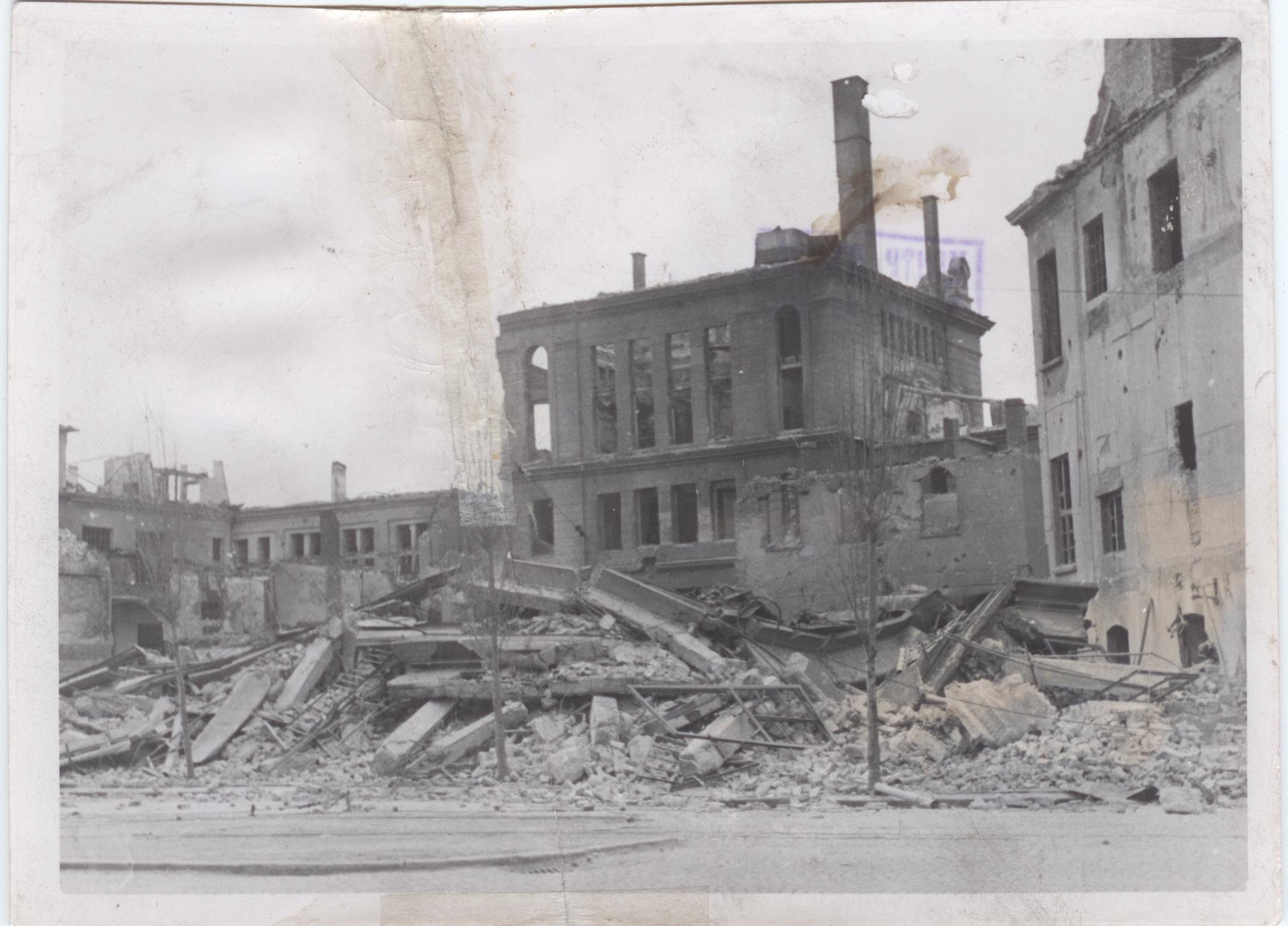
The destroyed State Printing House.

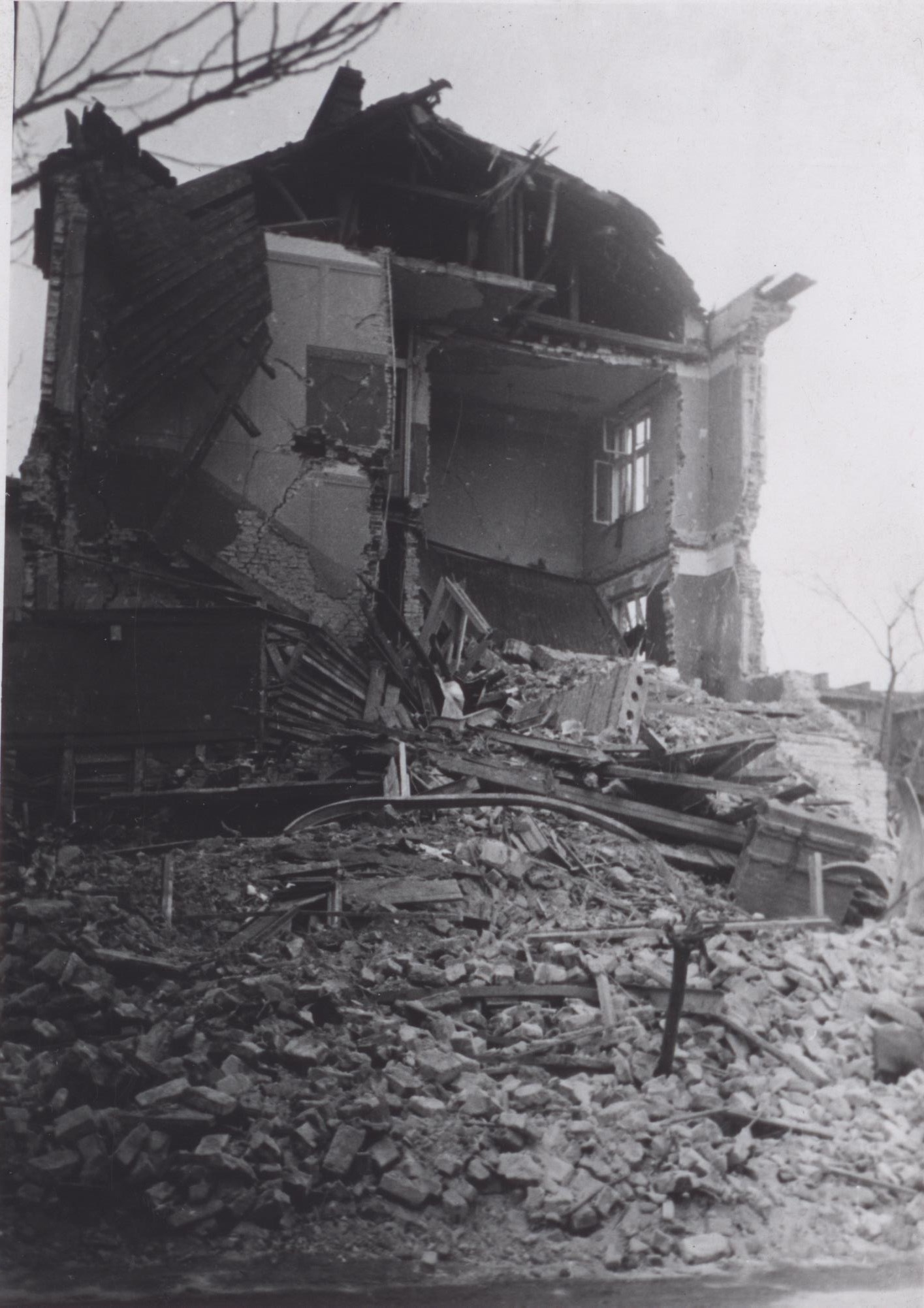
Destroyed building on Tsaritsa Yoanna blvd.

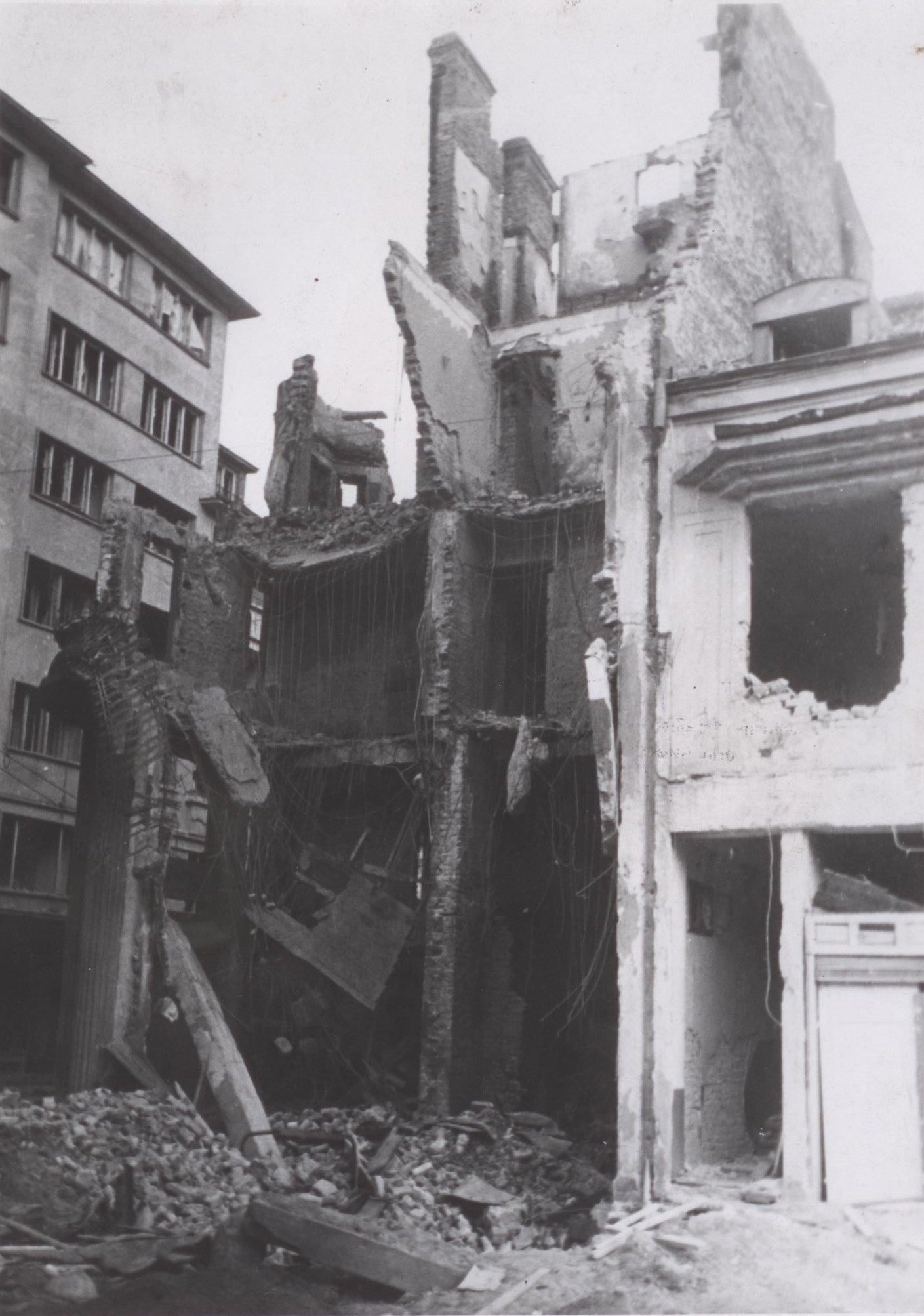
Destroyed building on Tsaritsa Yoanna blvd.

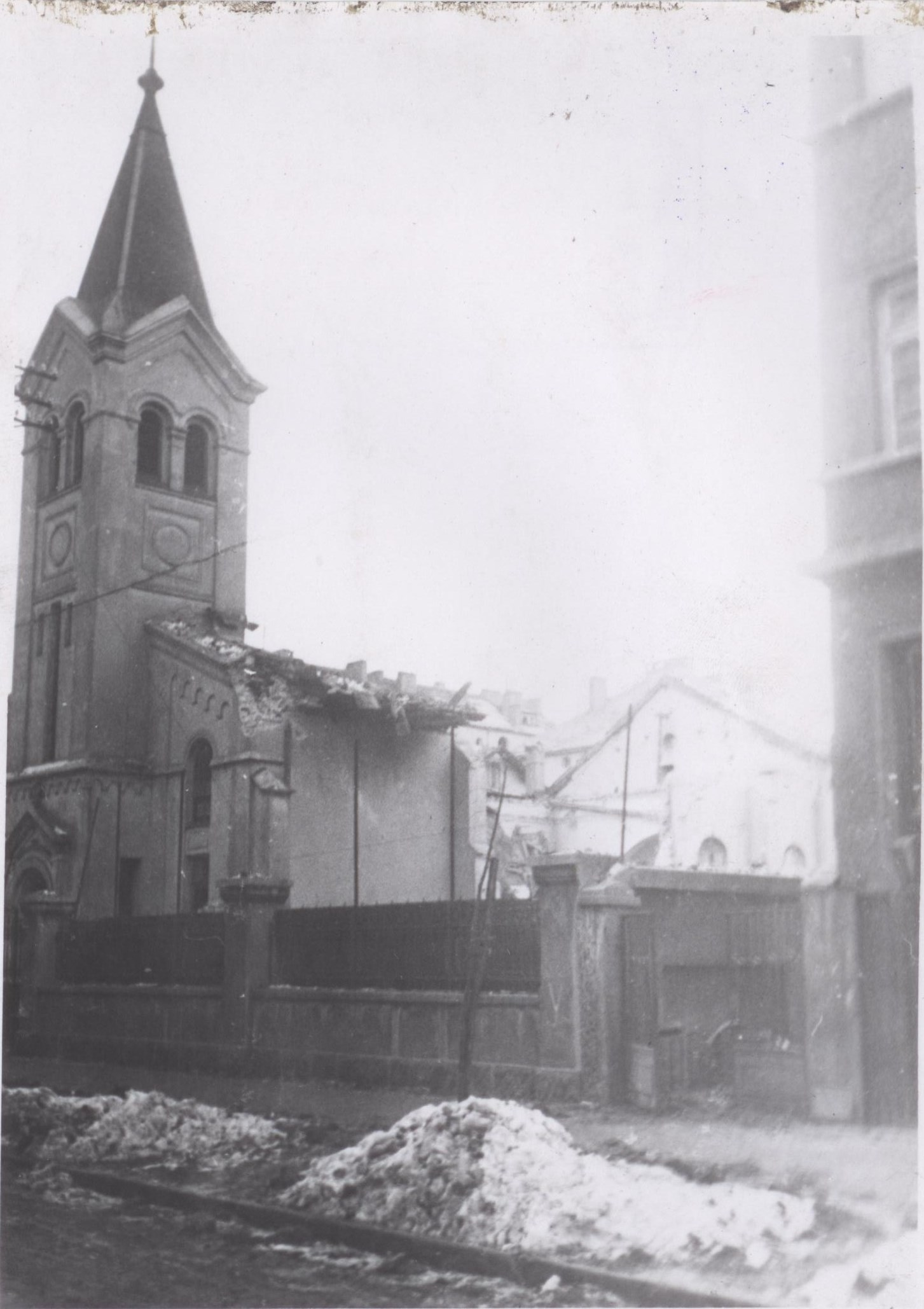
The Evangelical church near the Russian Monument.

Destruction in Sofia in 1944 after the bombing as photographed by Tsanko Lavrenov

== Notable victims ==
- Georgi Fingov, Bulgarian architect
- Bozhil Stoyanov, Bulgarian actor
- Hristo Obreshkov, Bulgarian violinist and music teacher
- Anna Masheva, Bulgarian painter and teacher
- Mihail Madzharov, Bulgarian diplomat and politician
- Petko Voynikov, Bulgarian philologist and publicist
- Panayot Keremedchiev, Bulgarian fiction writer, playwright, journalist and poet
- Stoyan Belinov, Bulgarian doctor

== See also ==
- Military history of Bulgaria during World War II
- History of Sofia
- There Is A Spirit In Europe: A Memoir of Frank Thompson 80 Years On. Imprint Lulu: Brittunculi Records & Books. Taylor, Jonathan R. P (2024) contains a balanced 'Allied perspective' on the RAF bomber command raids. ISBN 9781304479525.
