= Berov Government =

Government of Bulgaria (1992–1994)

- 83rd Cabinet of Bulgaria

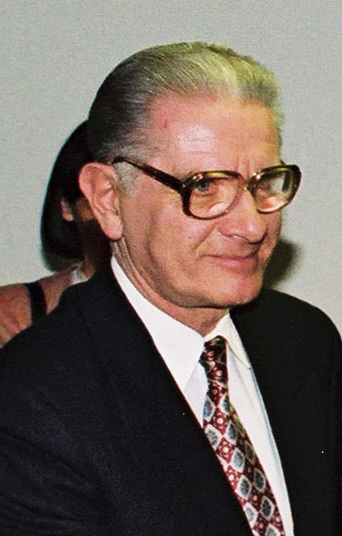
- Prime Minister Lyuben Berov
- Date formed: 30 December 1992
- Date dissolved: 17 October 1994

People and organisations
- President: Zhelyu Zhelev
- Prime Minister: Lyuben Berov, Independent
- Member parties: DPS; Confidence and supply: BSP; SDS (faction)
- Status in legislature: Technocratic government
- Opposition parties: SDS (faction)

History
- Election: 1991
- Legislature term: 36th National Assembly
- Predecessor: Dimitrov Government
- Successor: Indzhova Government

The Berov Government was the 83rd cabinet of Bulgaria. It was approved by the parliament on 30 December 1992 with the majority of DPS, BSP and a faction of SDS. With a few exceptions, the government consisted of non-party members, including Prime Minister Lyuben Berov himself, who were considered experts in their respective field.

The government eventually collapsed on 17 October 1994, when Prime Minister Berov resigned due to the GDP shrinking by roughly 24% in comparison to 1989, unemployment skyrocketing to 20%, crime rate hitting a record high and various other factors.

== Cabinet ==
The cabinet consists of the following ministries:

Cabinet members
Portfolio	Minister	Took office	Left office	Party
Prime Minister	Lyuben Berov	30 December 1992	17 October 1994	Independent
Deputy Prime Minister; Minister of Transport	Neycho Neev	30 December 1992	23 June 1993	SDS
Deputy Prime Minister; Minister of Transport	Kiril Ermenkov	23 June 1993	17 October 1994	Independent
Deputy Prime Minister; Minister of Labour and Social Care	Evgeni Matinchev	30 December 1992	17 October 1994	DPS
Deputy Prime Minister; Minister of Commerce	Valentin Karabashev	30 December 1992	15 July 1994	Independent
Deputy Prime Minister; Minister of Commerce	Kiril Tsochev	15 July 1994	17 October 1994	Independent
Minister of Finance	Stoyan Alexandrov	30 December 1992	17 October 1994	Independent
Minister of Interior	Viktor Mihaylov	30 December 1992	17 October 1994	Independent
Minister of Foreign Affairs	Lyuben Berov	30 December 1992	23 June 1993	Independent
Minister of Foreign Affairs	Stanislav Daskalov	23 June 1993	17 October 1994	Independent
Minister of Territorial Development and Construction	Hristo Totev	30 December 1992	17 October 1994	DPS
Minister of Defence	Valentin Alexandrov	30 December 1992	17 October 1994	Independent
Minister of Justice	Misho Valchev	30 December 1992	15 May 1993	Independent
Minister of Justice	Petar Kornazhev	23 May 1993	17 October 1994	BSP
Minister of Education and Science	Marko Todorov	30 December 1992	17 October 1994	SDS
Minister of Health	Tancho Gugalov	30 December 1992	17 October 1994	Independent
Minister of Culture	Ivaylo Znepolski	30 December 1992	17 October 1994	Independent
Minister of Environment	Valentin Bosevski	30 December 1992	17 October 1994	Independent
Minister of Agriculture	Georgi Tanev	30 December 1992	17 October 1994	Independent
Minister of Manufacturing	Rumen Bikov	30 December 1992	17 October 1994	SDS
