= Indzhova Government =

Government of Bulgaria (1994–1995)

- 84th Cabinet of Bulgaria
- Date formed: 17 October 1994
- Date dissolved: 25 January 1995

People and organisations
- Head of state: President Zhelyu Zhelev
- Head of government: Reneta Indzhova
- Status in legislature: Provisional Government

History
- Predecessor: Berov Government
- Successor: Videnov Government

The eighty-fourth Cabinet of Bulgaria (the Indzhova Government) was a caretaker technocratic government set up by President Zhelyu Zhelev following the resignation of the Berov government. The government, headed by Prime Minister Reneta Indzhova, ruled from 17 October 1994 to 25 January 1995 at which time the new cabinet took office.

== Formation ==
The technocratic government led by Lyuben Berov resigned in September 1994. With no party willing to form a new government, the President appointed Indzhova to head a provisional government that would lead the country through the early elections on December 18 of that same year.

== Dissolution ==
Following the victory in the December elections of the Democratic Left, an electoral alliance led by the Bulgarian Socialist Party, the newly elected 37 National Assembly voted in Zhan Videnov and his cabinet. Thus, after ruling for exactly 100 days, the Indzhova government was officially dissolved.

== See also ==
- History of Bulgaria since 1989
