= Philip Dimitrov Government =

Government of Bulgaria (1991–1992)

Dimitrov Government
- 82nd Cabinet of Bulgaria

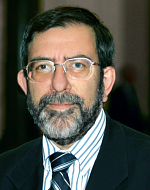
- Prime Minister Philip Dimitrov
- Date formed: 8 November 1991
- Date dissolved: 30 December 1992

People and organisations
- President: Zhelyu Zhelev
- Prime Minister: Philip Dimitrov, SDS
- Member parties: SDS; Confidence and supply: DPS
- Status in legislature: Minority Government
- Opposition parties: BSP

History
- Election: 1991
- Legislature term: 36th National Assembly
- Predecessor: Popov Government
- Successor: Berov Government

The Dimitrov Government was the 82nd cabinet of Bulgaria.

== History ==
It was formed as a result of the 1991 Bulgarian parliamentary election. It was a minority government formed by the SDS party, which was the largest at the time. The BSP party, which finished second, led the opposition to the government, while the third party, the Movement for Rights and Freedoms, supported the government to supply its majority.
The government eventually collapsed in October 1992, when a vote of confidence took place in the National Assembly. The Movement for Rights and Freedoms withdrew its support for the government, allowing the motion to pass.
