= Videnov Government =

Government of Bulgaria (1995–1997)

- 85th Cabinet of Bulgaria
- Date formed: 25 January 1995
- Date dissolved: 12 February 1997

People and organisations
- Head of government: Zhan Videnov
- Member parties: Bulgarian Socialist Party
- Status in legislature: Coalition Government

History
- Election: 1994
- Legislature term: 37th National Assembly
- Outgoing formation: Resignation
- Predecessor: Indzhova Government (Provisional)
- Successor: Sofiyanski Government (Provisional)

The eighty-fifth cabinet of Bulgaria, also known as the Videnov cabinet or Videnov Government, was a coalition government in Bulgaria, led by the Bulgarian Socialist Party, which ruled from 25 January 1995 to 12 February 1997. The Socialist-led coalition government resigned after nationwide protests because of hyperinflation, banking crisis and economic collapse.

== See also ==
- History of Bulgaria since 1989
