= Konstantin Jovanović =

Serbian and Bulgarian architect

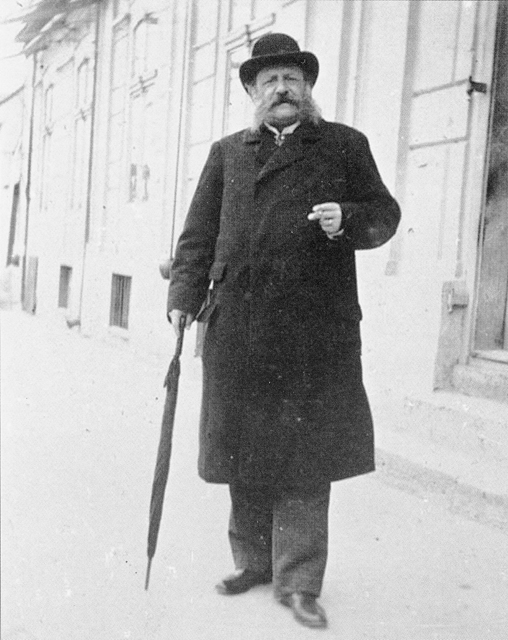
- Konstantin Jovanović in 1898
- Born: 13 January 1849; Vienna, Austrian Empire (modern Austria)
- Died: 15 February 1923 (aged 74); Zürich, Switzerland
- Education: Zürich Polytechnic (1870)
- Occupations: Architect, architectural theorist, artist, photographer and writer
- Buildings: National Assembly of Bulgaria building; National Assembly of Serbia building

Konstantin Jovanović (Serbian Cyrillic: Константин Јовановић; Bulgarian: Константин Йованович; 13 January 1849 – 15 February 1923) was a Serbian and Bulgarian architect known for providing the original designs of the National Assembly of Bulgaria and National Assembly of Serbia buildings.

== Life ==
=== Origin and early life ===
Jovanović was born in Vienna, capital of the Austrian Empire, to first Serbian photographer Anastas Jovanović, a lithographer and early photographer from Vratsa (in modern Bulgaria), who was superintendent of the Serbian royal court in Belgrade under Prince Michael.

Konstantin Jovanović finished a classical high school in Vienna and graduated from the Zürich Polytechnic in Switzerland in 1870 with honours. After his graduation, he visited Italy, where he studied Italian Renaissance art first-hand.

=== Architecture ===
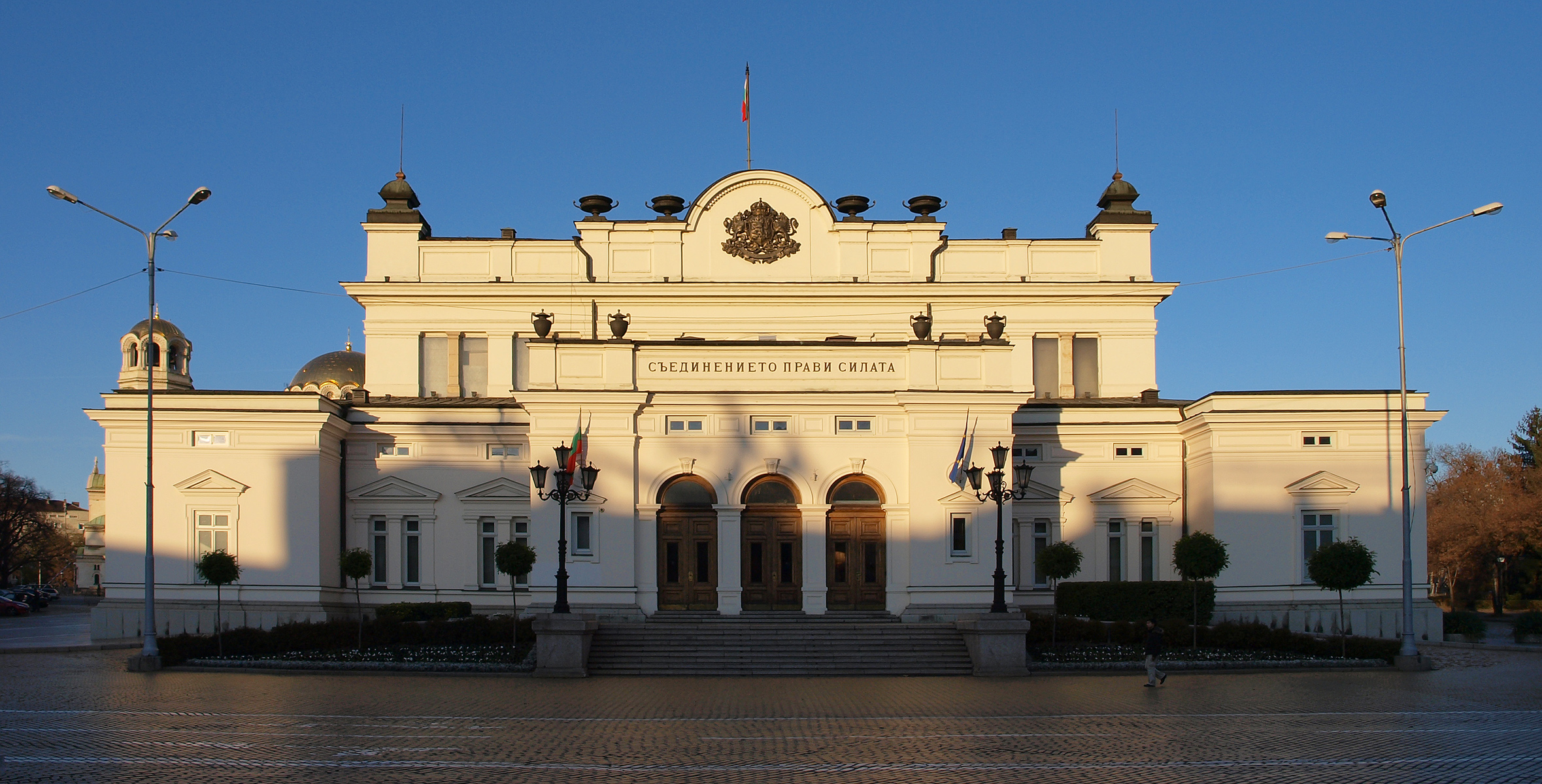
Neo-Renaissance National Assembly of Bulgaria building

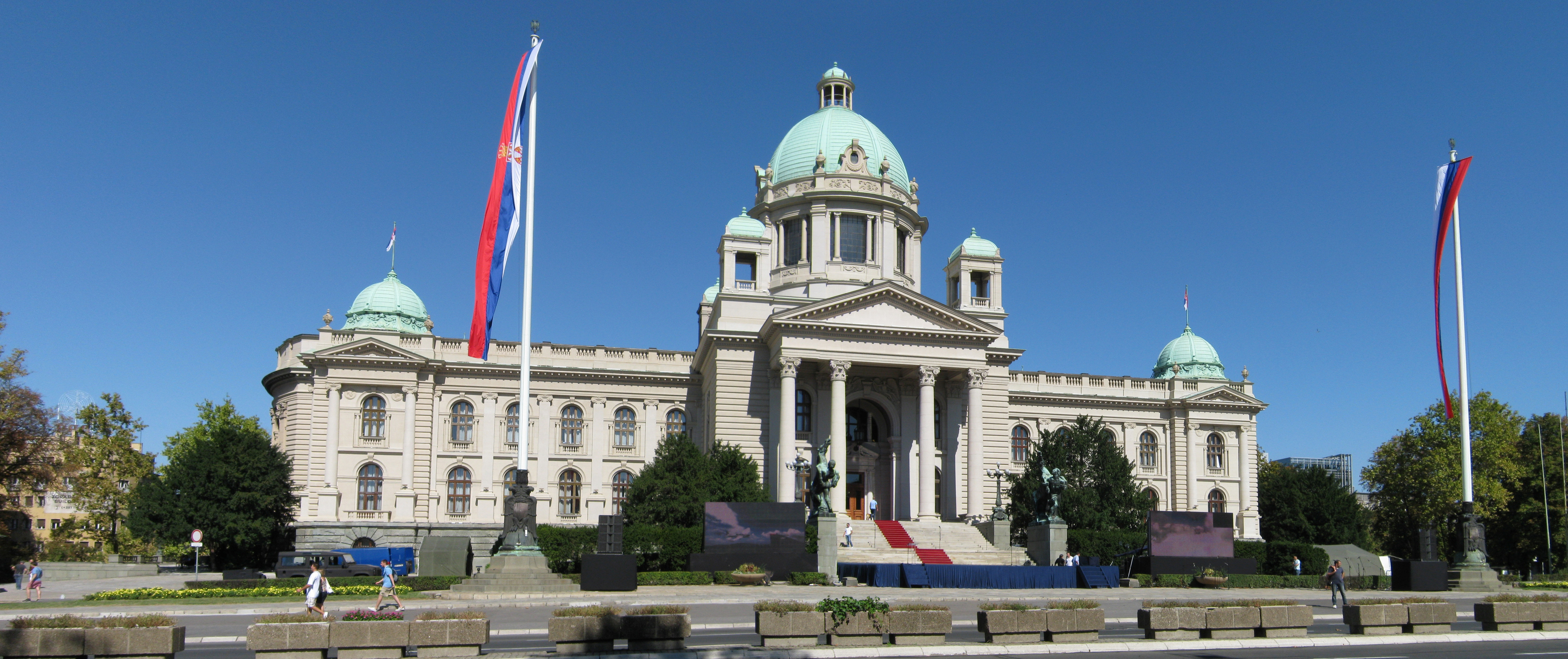
Neoclassical National Assembly of Serbia building

Jovanović commenced his career as an architect in Vienna, though he was most active in the Kingdom of Serbia and the Principality of Bulgaria. His architectural style was said to draw heavily from that of German architect Gottfried Semper (1803–1879), under whom he studied in Zürich.

Jovanović arrived in the Bulgarian capital Sofia in 1880 or 1881 at the invitation of Bulgarian Minister of Education Konstantin Josef Jireček and remained in the country for several years. The First Sofia High School for Boys building, the first building of Sofia University and the Lom high school building were constructed to his design. Jovanović also created the first and basic design of the Neo-Renaissance National Assembly of Bulgaria building, the construction of which began on 4 June 1884.

In Serbia, he was active from the mid-1880s to the 1920s. His first projects in the Serbian capital were the private houses of lawyer Marko Stojanović and Dragomir Radulović. He also designed the original National Bank of Serbia edifice, one of the best examples of Neo-Renaissance architecture in the country, based on the architecture of Italian Renaissance palaces. The National Bank of Serbia building is regarded by some as Jovanović's most important work. Jovanović provided the original design for the National Assembly of Serbia in 1891. In 1901, a variant of his solution by Jovan Ilkić won the competition for the edifice's architectural design.

Besides being a prominent architect, Jovanović was also an artist, architectural theorist, photographer and writer. He died in Zürich, Switzerland in 1923.
