= Old Parliament House, Sofia =

Coordinates: 42.6944°N 23.3328°E

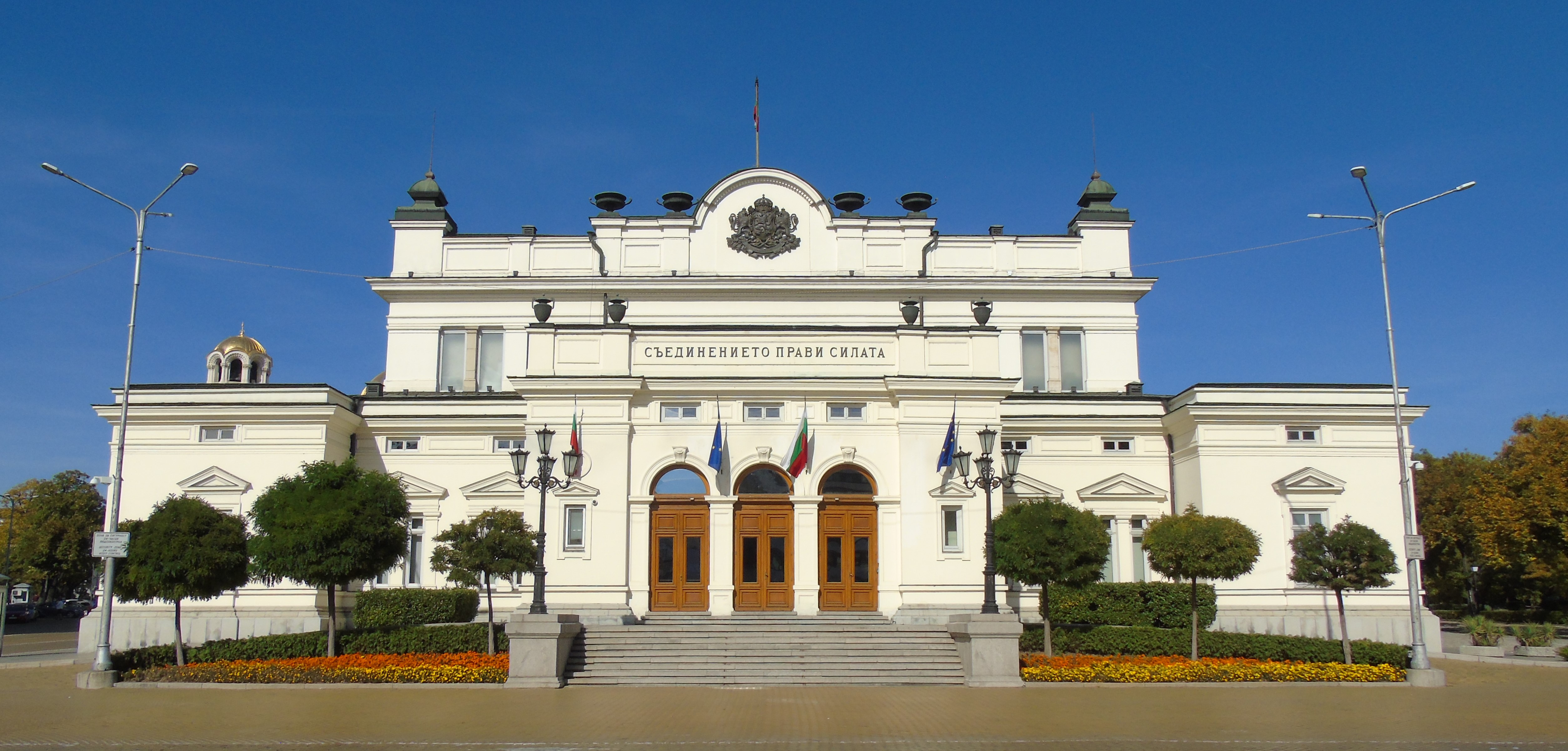
View from Tsar Osvoboditel

The National Assembly Building is used by the Bulgarian parliament for parliamentary debates. The main building has been proclaimed a monument of culture for its historic significance. Situated in downtown Sofia, it was designed in Neo-Renaissance style by Konstantin Jovanović, a Serbian-Bulgarian architect who received his education in Vienna and Switzerland and whose other works include the Parliament of Serbia building. It was constructed between 1884 and 1886 by Friederich Wilhelm Gustav Liebe, a young builder from Saxony who was 22 years old when construction began. The building was originally painted in an off-white hue, but since the latter part of the 20th century has been white.

The building is depicted on the reverse of the Bulgarian 20 leva banknote, issued in 1999 and 2007.

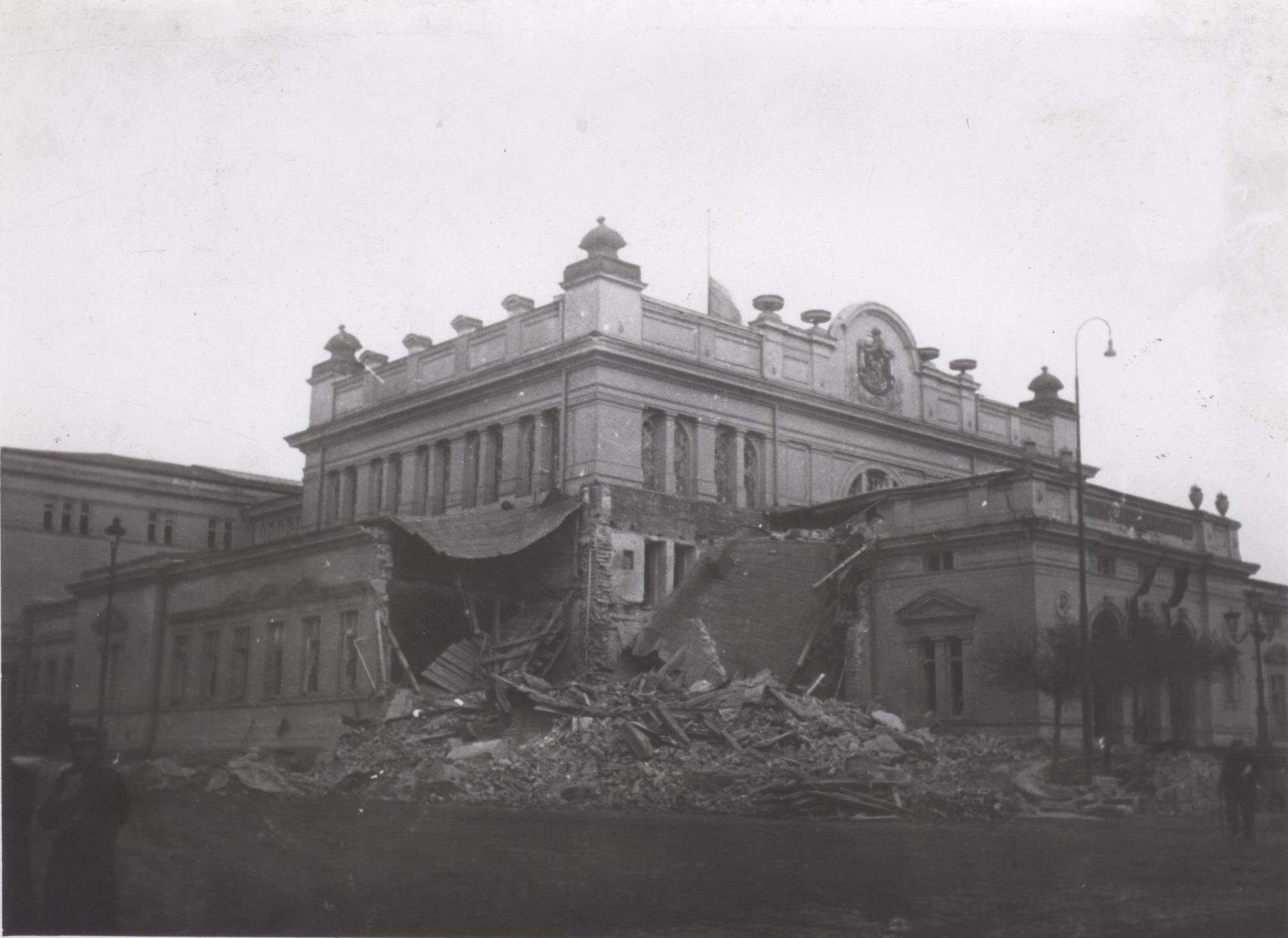
The Parliament House after the Allied bombing on January 10, 1944

Due to insufficient space in the main building at Parliament Square, some administrative offices of the National Assembly are now housed in the former headquarters (Партийния дом, Partiyniya dom, "the Party House") of the Bulgarian Communist Party, located at the Largo.

There has been a proposal that the entire National Assembly be permanently moved to the former Bulgarian Communist Party headquarters building, with its inner courtyard being converted into an interior space for the plenary chamber, which happened in 2020. In September 2020, parliament moved to the former BCP Party House.

After the April 2021 Bulgarian parliamentary election, the National Assembly moved again to the old Parliament House because the new opposition led-majority (ITN, Democratic Bulgaria, ISMV) viewed the Party House building as a symbol of Bulgaria's communist past.

In August 2023, the National Assembly announced that they will move again to the former Party house building for a period of 2–3 years by September, due to main repair of the national assembly building. The former Party House was modernized before the start of September.
