= Bulgaria–United States relations =

- Bulgaria: United States

Diplomatic mission
- Embassy of Bulgaria, Washington, D.C.: Embassy of the United States, Sofia

Envoy
- Ambassador Georgi Panayotov: Chargé d'affaires H. Martin McDowell

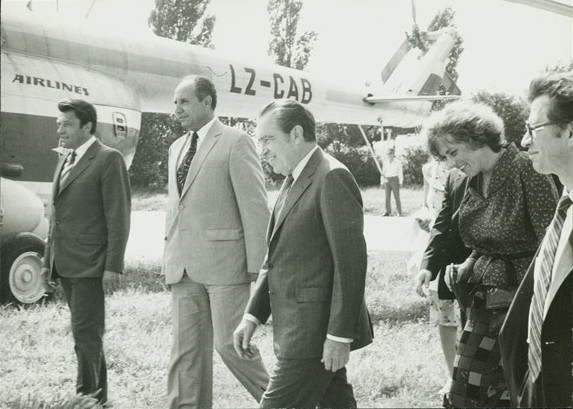
Former U.S. President Richard Nixon and Elena Poptodorova during his visit to Varna, Bulgaria, July 1982

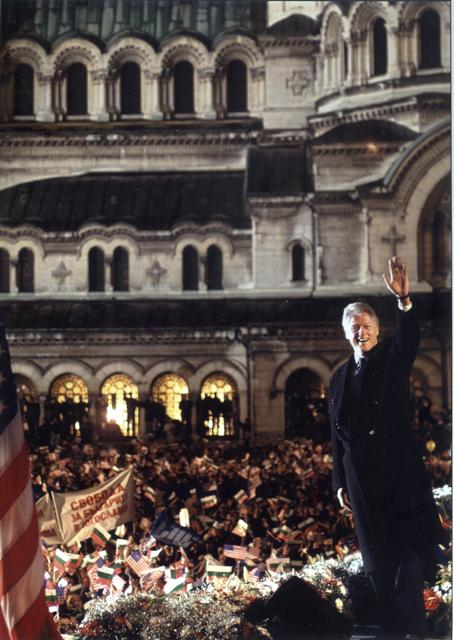
President Bill Clinton, the first acting U.S. President to visit Bulgaria, in front of Alexander Nevsky Cathedral, Sofia, November 1999

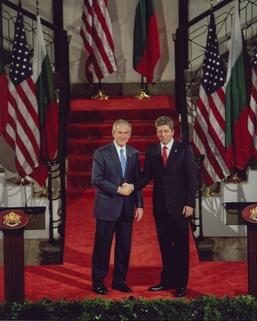
U.S. president George W. Bush and Bulgarian president Georgi Parvanov, National Archaeological Museum, Sofia, June 2007

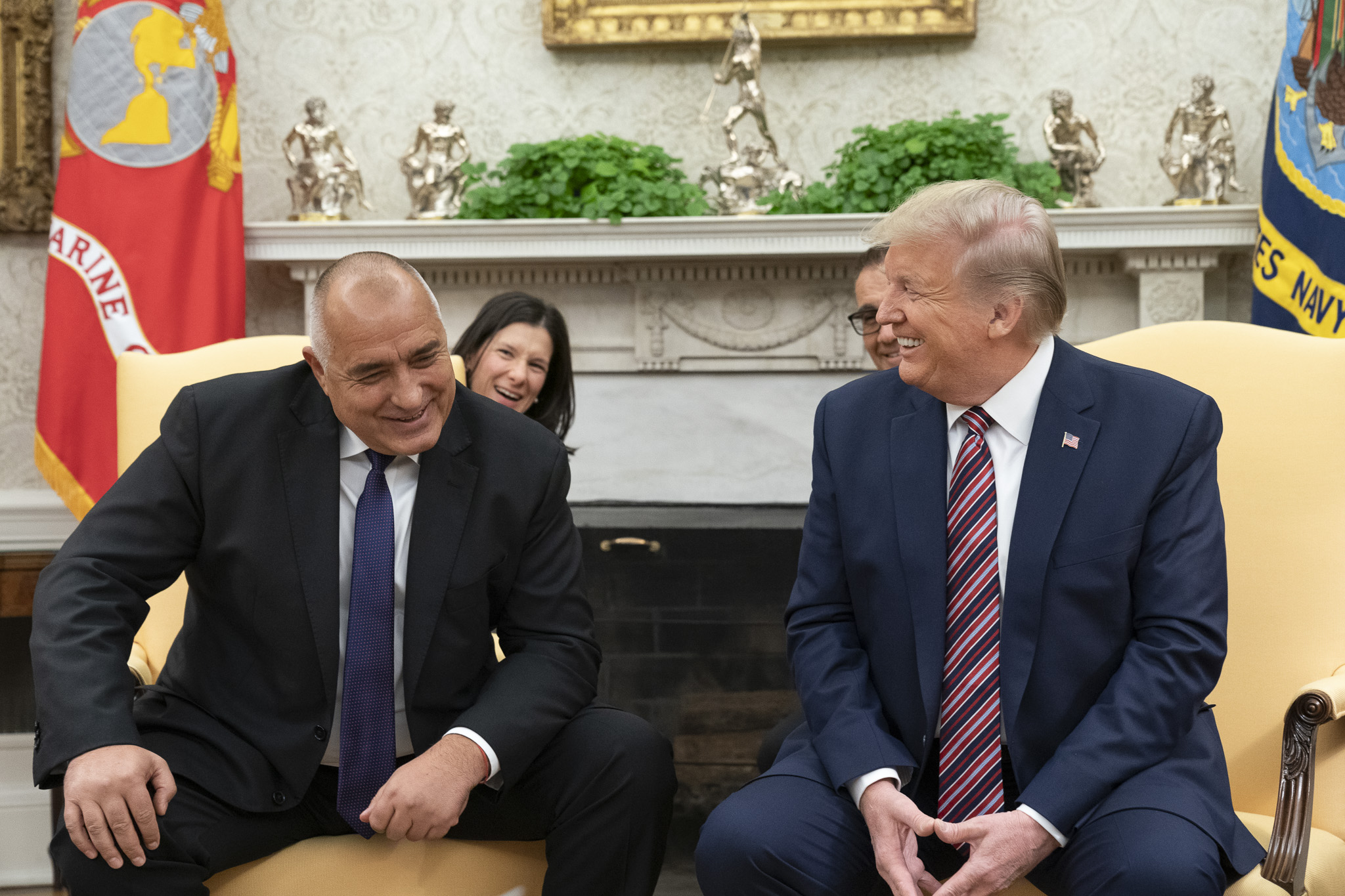
Bulgarian Prime Minister Boyko Borisov with U.S. President Donald Trump in the Oval Office of the White House on 25 November 2019

Relations between Bulgaria and the United States were first formally established in 1903, have moved from missionary activity and American support for Bulgarian independence in the late 19th century to the growth of trade and commerce in the early 20th century, to reluctant hostility during World War I and open war and bombardment in World War II, to ideological confrontation during the Cold War, to partnership with the United States in the North Atlantic Treaty Organization (NATO) and growing political, military and economic ties in the beginning of the 21st century.

According to the 2012 U.S. Global Leadership Report, 32% of Bulgarians approve of U.S. leadership, with 16% disapproving and 52% uncertain.

== History of relations ==
Embassy of Bulgaria in Washington, D.C.
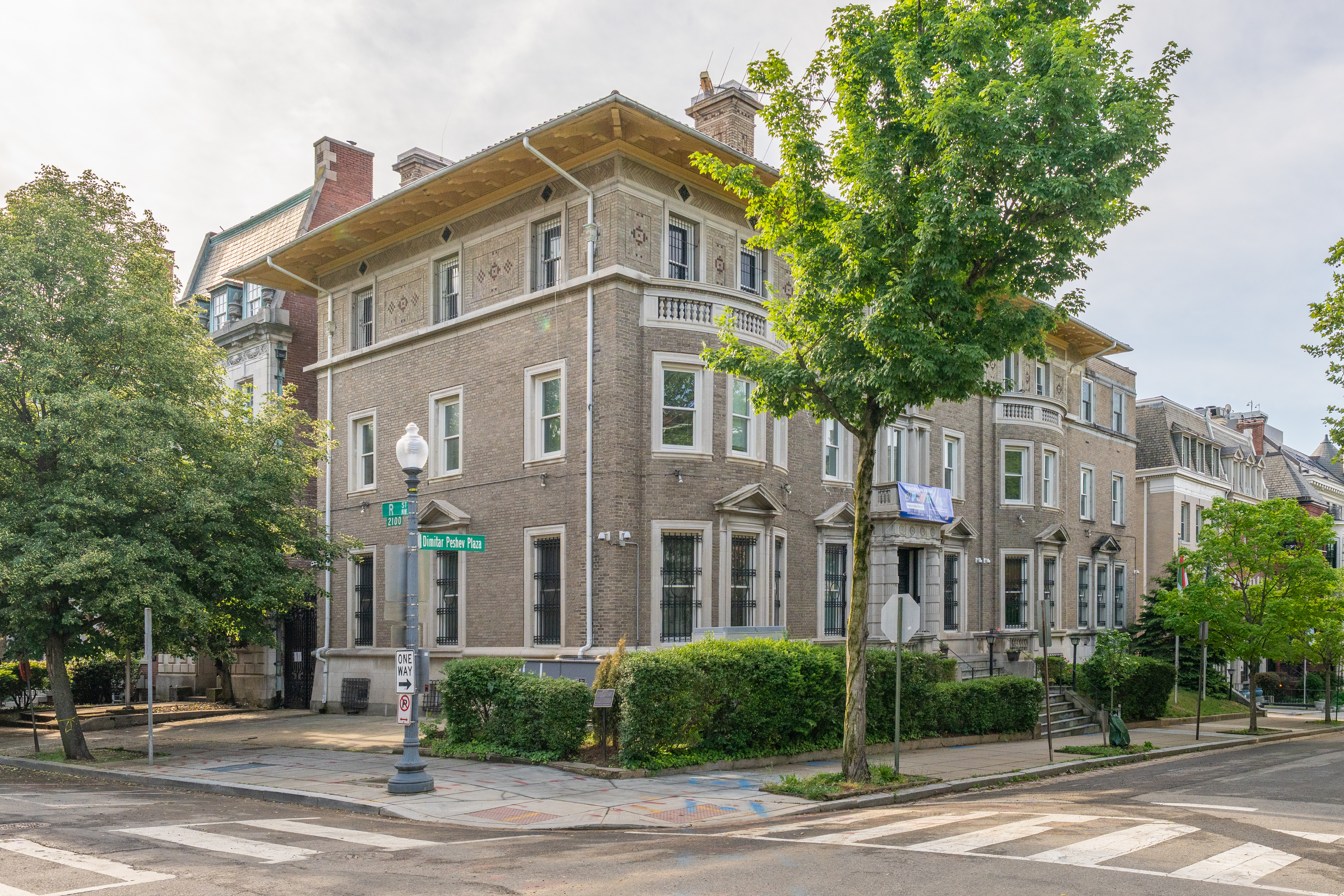
- Location: Washington, D.C.
- Address: 1621 22nd Street, N.W.
- Ambassador: Georgi Panayotov
- Website: http://www.bulgaria-embassy.org/

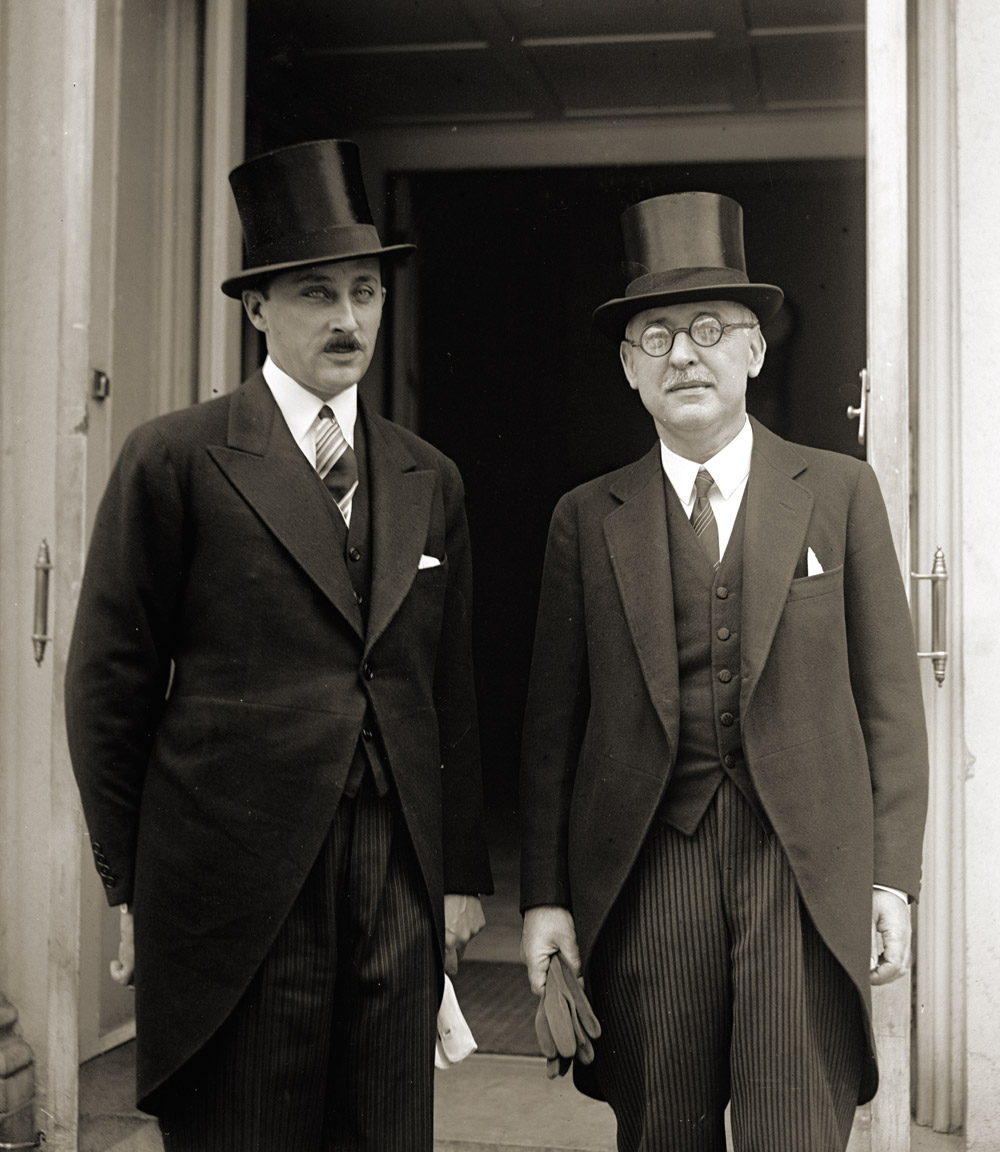
Prince Kiril of Bulgaria (left) and Ambassador Simeon Radev (right) in Washington before their meeting with President Herbert Hoover in 1929

In 1892, the representative of Bulgaria in Constantinople held the first talks with associates of the US legation there. The negotiations were completed in 1901, when an agreement was reached between the two countries for the US minister plenipotentiary in Constantinople to also be accredited in Sofia.

The Principality of Bulgaria and the United States established diplomatic relations in 1903. The US minister plenipotentiary for Greece, Romania, and Serbia was also authorized for Bulgaria. He presented his credentials to Prince Ferdinand in Sofia on September 19, 1903. On September 22, 1908, Bulgaria declared its independence from the Ottoman Empire. On May 3, 1909, the US secretary of state sent a telegram to Hutcheson, acting diplomatic representative for Bulgaria, informing him of the order of the US president to convey his congratulations to King Ferdinand on Bulgaria's admission to the community of sovereign and independent countries. With this act, the United States recognized the independence of the Kingdom of Bulgaria.

On December 10, 1914, Stefan Panaretov was appointed Bulgarian minister plenipotentiary in the United States. The Bulgarian legation in Washington was officially opened on January 16, 1915.

Under pressure from Germany, Bulgaria declared war on the United States on December 13, 1941. Bulgaria's ambassador to the United States, Dimitar Naumov, learned about the war from the newspapers. Convinced that this was a mistake, Naumov in an open telegram demanded a rebuttal from Sofia and said that "rumors of a war are more than incredible and comical" and that in the United States it is considered incredible for Bulgaria to declare war on the States. Minister Plenipotentiary George H. Earl III left Sofia at the end of December. The United States declared war on Bulgaria only on June 5, 1942.

In 1945, by virtue of an agreement to establish an Allied Control Commission in Bulgaria, on October 17, 1945, General Vladimir Stoychev was sent to Washington as a political representative of Bulgaria. After the entry into force of the Paris Peace Treaty in September 1947, diplomatic relations were restored, but only three years later the State Department froze diplomatic relations with Bulgaria. The reason is that in the early 1950s, the Bulgarian government accused U.S. Minister Donald Heath of espionage and declared him persona non grata. The United States and Bulgaria agreed to resume diplomatic relations on March 24, 1959 after the Bulgarian authorities had issued a formal apology in the Heath case.

== From first contacts to 1919 ==
=== American missionaries and schools in Bulgaria ===
The first contact between Americans and Bulgarians in the early 19th century was through American books and American missionaries. The first American literature to be translated into Bulgarian was Benjamin Franklin's introduction to Poor Richard's Almanack, "The Way to Wealth", in 1837. In 1839, a Protestant religious society, the American Board of Commissioners for Foreign Missions, sent the first Protestant missionaries to the Ottoman Empire, where the Ottoman Government had given them permission to preach to the Christian population. One of these missionaries, Elias Riggs, learned Bulgarian and published the first guide to Bulgarian grammar for foreigners in 1843. By the end of the 1850s, American missionaries had printed and distributed a version of the Bible in the Bulgarian vernacular. Charles Morse published a full textbook of Bulgarian grammar in 1860, and compiled the first Bulgarian-English dictionary.

In 1860, the first American school (today called the American College of Sofia) was founded in Plovdiv by missionaries from the Congregational Church. Besides Bible instruction, it taught mathematics, chemistry, physics, and the English language. In 1863, a school for young women was opened in Stara Zagora. The two schools merged and moved to Samokov in 1869. The American School of Samokov offered an American-style education, taught in English to the Bulgarians.

Robert College, a branch of the State University of New York, also played an important part in educating the new Bulgarian elite. It opened its campus in Istanbul in 1863, teaching mathematics, natural history, economics, logic, political history, international law, philosophy, and the English language. By 1868 half the student body were Bulgarians. Two future Prime Ministers of Bulgaria, Konstantin Stoilov, Todor Ivanchov studied there. American missionaries also founded the newspaper Zornitsa, which published for seventy-six years, with articles on science, history, and the theory and practice of western democracy. The model of the American Republic was frequently discussed by Bulgarian intelligentsia as one model for an independent Bulgaria.

The Protestant missionaries had limited success in Bulgaria. Their work was opposed by the Bulgarian Orthodox Church and by many leaders of the Bulgarian national-liberation movement, who did not want to see Bulgaria divided by religion, but the schools and newspapers founded by the missionaries contributed to the Bulgarian National Awakening and the American missionaries who returned to the United States often became unofficial diplomats for Bulgaria.

=== American diplomats, journalists and Bulgarian independence ===
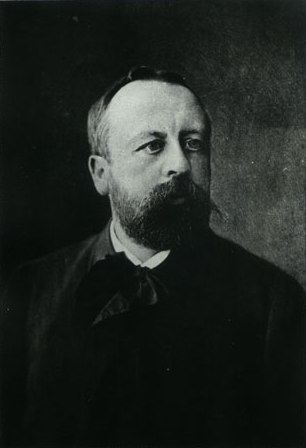
American Consul-General to Istanbul Eugene Schuyler

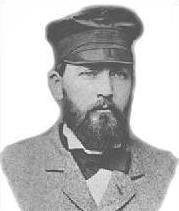
American journalist Januarius MacGahan

In April 1876 (May by the modern calendar), a group of Bulgarian nationalists led an uprising against Ottoman rule in the area in different parts of the country. (See April Uprising.) The uprising was badly planned, equipped and led, and failed. It was followed by savage reprisals and massacres carried out by Turkish regular and irregular soldiers. Bulgarian students at Robert College in Istanbul brought the stories of the massacres to the attention of Dr. Albert Long and the acting president of Robert College Dr. George Washburn, who wrote letters to the Istanbul correspondent of the London Daily News Edwin Pears. On June 23 Pears wrote the first article about the "Bulgarian Horrors". The article led to inquires in Parliament, and Prime Minister Benjamin Disraeli called for a formal investigation.

The American Consul General in Istanbul, Eugene Schuyler, traveled to the Bulgarian territories of the Ottoman Empire in July and August 1876 to investigate the reports of atrocities and massacres. He was joined by an American journalist Januarius MacGahan, on a commission for the London Daily News. MacGahan wrote a series of vivid articles about the massacres, particularly about what had happened in the Bulgarian village of Batak, where MacGahan reported that the entire village had been massacred. These reports, carried in the British and European press and later printed as pamphlets, caused widespread anger against the Ottoman Government. In November 1876, Consul General Schuyler and Prince Tseretelev published their full report, estimating that fifteen thousand Bulgarians had been killed in the aftermath of the uprising. (A report by British diplomat Walter Baring at the same time put the number at twelve thousand.) In addition to describing the reprisals and massacres, it contained the first map of the Bulgarian population in the region.

The Russian Government demanded reforms by the Ottoman Government to protect the Bulgarians and other nationalities within the Ottoman Empire. When the Ottoman Government refused, the Russian Empire declared war on Turkey. In 1877, the Russian Army moved through Romania, crossed the Danube and defeated the Turkish Army, after costly battles at Pleven and Shipka Pass. (See the Russo-Turkish War (1877–1878) and History of Bulgaria.) The advance of the Russian Army was covered by MacGahan and other journalists for the British press.

The American public, largely thanks to the reports of MacGahan and American missionaries in Bulgaria, was sympathetic to the Bulgarian cause. The Turkish Government accused Consul-General Schuyler of bias toward the Bulgarians and breach of diplomatic practice. He was withdrawn from Istanbul by the U.S. Government in May 1878.

With their army defeated, The Ottoman Sultan was forced to sign the Treaty of San Stefano, which granted extensive territories to a newly independent Bulgaria. However, the British, German, and French governments refused to recognize the new Russian-sponsored state. In 1878, the Treaty of Berlin, drafted largely by German chancellor Otto Von Bismarck and British prime minister Benjamin Disraeli, drew a new map of Bulgaria which returned parts of eastern and southern Bulgaria as well as the whole geographical region of Macedonia to Turkey, gave the Dobrudzha (also Dobruja) region along the Danube to Romania. The Berlin Treaty created the Principality of Bulgaria, nominally under Ottoman rule. Prince Alexander of Battenberg, nephew of King Alexander the Second, became the first Prince.

The loss of lands which Bulgarians saw as part of their homeland was bitterly resented in Bulgaria. The re-uniting of these territories to Bulgaria became the major objective of Bulgarian foreign policy for the next sixty years.

== American isolationism and tentative diplomacy ==
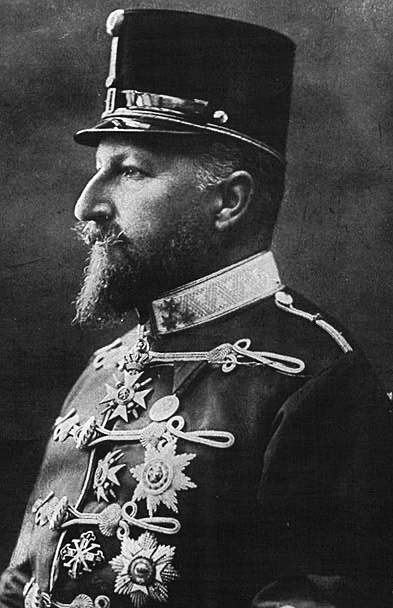
King Ferdinand of Bulgaria

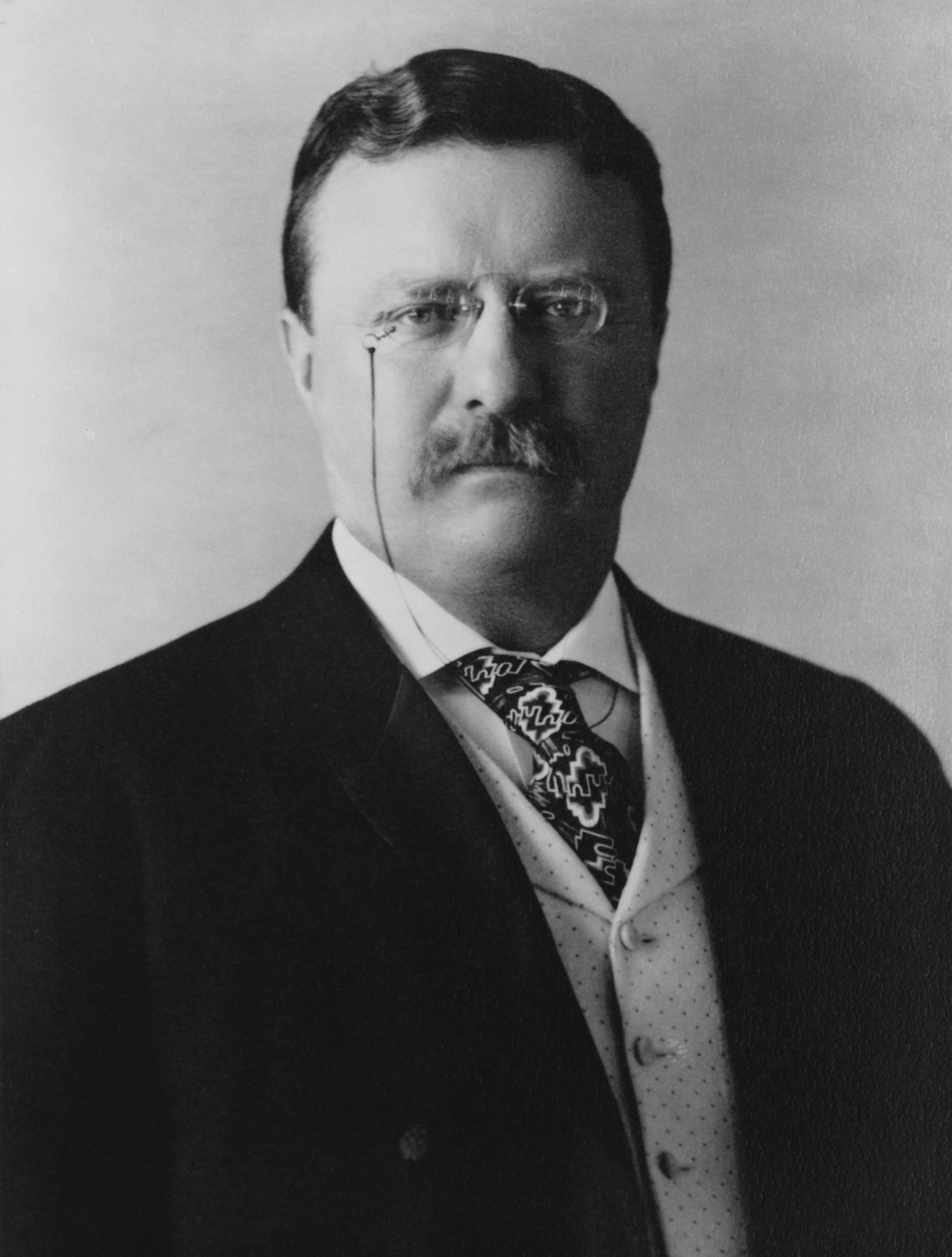
President Theodore Roosevelt

America and Bulgaria had little diplomatic contact in the nineteenth century, but it did have commercial and cultural contact. Bulgaria had a modest participation in the 1893 Chicago Exposition. The Bulgarian writer Aleko Konstantinov visited the exposition and wrote a book, To Chicago and Back, in which he presented America as a technological leader and a land of opportunity. The book made a strong impression on the imagination of many Bulgarian intellectuals, and shaped their image of America.

In 1887, the Russian Government, which suspected Prince Alexander of liberal tendencies, organized a coup in Bulgaria. Alexander went into exile, and the Bulgarian government chose a German prince, Ferdinand Saxe-Coburg-Gotha, as their new ruler.

The United States made a tentative attempt to establish diplomatic relations with Bulgaria in 1901, but the diplomat named by Washington was rejected by the Bulgarian Government, since he was based in Istanbul rather than in the principality.

Finally, on September 19, 1903, John B. Jackson, U.S. Special Envoy and Minister Plenipotentiary to Greece, Romania and Serbia, presented his diplomatic credentials and his accreditation letter from U.S. President Theodore Roosevelt to Prince Ferdinand. At his Palace in Sofia, Prince Ferdinand gave a toast to President Roosevelt in English, and a band played American music, but the U.S. still did not fully recognize Bulgaria as an independent nation, since it was still by treaty a principality under Ottoman sovereignty.

In 1908, when the Great Powers were distracted by the annexation of Bosnia by Austria-Hungary, Prince Ferdinand declared that Bulgaria was a fully independent state, and proclaimed himself King. Shortly afterward, President William Howard Taft offered full diplomatic recognition to Bulgaria.

In 1912 and 1913, Bulgaria fought two wars to try regain territories it felt were rightfully Bulgarian from its neighbors. In the First Balkan War (1912), Bulgaria allied itself with Serbia, Greece and Montenegro, and successfully took Thrace and large parts of Macedonia from Turkey. However, in the Second Balkan War (1913) Bulgaria quarreled with its former allies and went to war, eventually fighting against Serbia, Greece, Montenegro, Ottoman Turkey and Romania. Bulgaria lost most of Thrace to Greece and Turkey; the city of Silistra and province of Southern Dobrudzha to Romania, and most of Macedonia to Serbia. During both wars, the United States remained neutral.

=== Bulgaria and the United States in the First World War ===
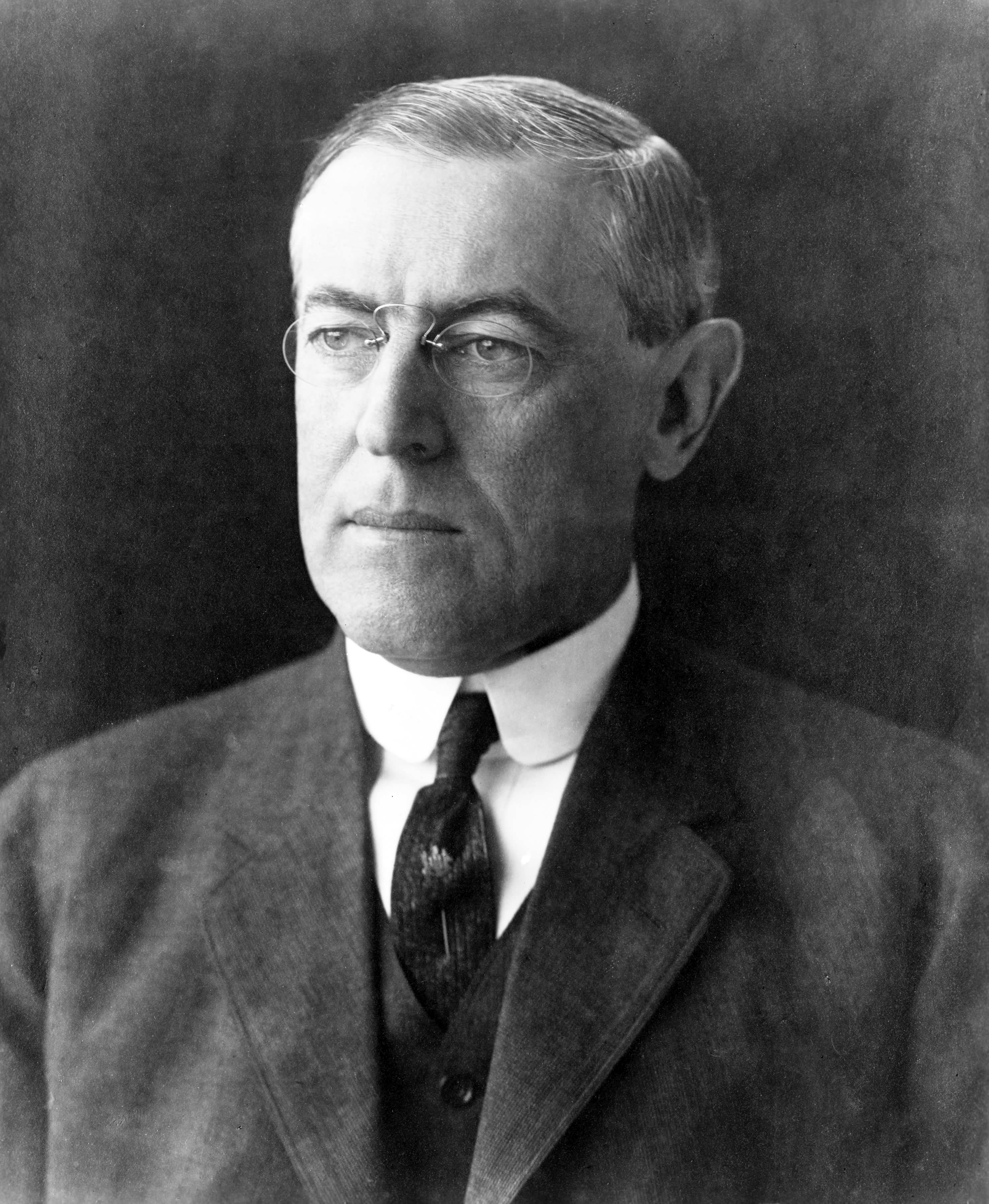
President Woodrow Wilson

Charles Vopicka, State Department officer for Bulgarian affairs

When World War I began in August 1914, both Bulgaria and the United States were neutral. The United States wished to stay out of any European conflict, while Bulgaria wanted to see which side, the Entente or the Central Powers, would help it regain Thrace, Dobrudzha, and Macedonia.

On December 22, 1914, Stefan Panaretov, a former professor from Robert College in Istanbul, presented his credentials to President Wilson in Washington, and became the first Bulgarian Ambassador to the United States. A few months later, in 1915, Dominick Murphy became the Consul-General in Sofia, the first American diplomat resident in Bulgaria.

U.S. diplomat Charles Vopicka, covering Bulgaria for the State Department, wrote to Secretary of State Lansing in November 1914: "In my opinion Bulgaria is trying to through her diplomacy what she lost on the battlefield last year.... Bulgaria is trying to get Macedonia from Serbia, Kavala from Greece, and Silistra from Romania without war. Neither of the belligerent parties here is willing to promise this territory to her, but the other Balkan States - Serbia, Greece and Romania - are opposed to giving anything to Bulgaria... it is also possible that if the chances of war favor Germany and Austria, Bulgaria will join them, against the will of her people whose sympathies are with Russia, because the present Bulgarian Government believes that it can obtain more from Germany and Austria than from Russia".

When British forces came close to capturing the Dardanelles and Istanbul in the spring of 1915, Bulgaria considered joining the Entente, but Britain, France and Russia were not willing to take territory away from their allies, Romania, Serbia and Greece. On the other hand, Germany promised to give Bulgaria the original borders it had had after the Treaty of San Stefano. Bulgaria signed an alliance with Germany on September 6, 1915, mobilized its forces, and declared war on Serbia on October 14. Britain, France and Italy, allies of Serbia, responded by declaring war on Bulgaria.

In October 1915 the State Department sent Lewis Einstein, a diplomat from the American Embassy in Istanbul, to Sofia. He met Prime Minister Radoslavov, who told him that Bulgaria wanted to preserve friendly relations with the United States, and had joined the war reluctantly. He confirmed to Einstein that Bulgaria's goal was to retain the territory lost in 1913 from the Treaty of Bucharest.

The Bulgarian Army, the largest in the Balkans, was victorious at first, occupying Skopje and most of the Serbian portion of Macedonia, entering Greek Macedonia, and taking Dobrudzha from the Romanians in September 1916.

On April 6, 1917, Germany's policy of unrestricted submarine warfare finally compelled the United States to declare war on Germany. The U.S. did not, however, declare war against Bulgaria or Germany's other allies, since Bulgaria did not have submarines and did not directly threaten American interests. The Bulgarian prime minister, Radoslavov, summoned U.S. Consul Dominick Murphy and assured him that Bulgaria was anxious to maintain good relations with the United States. Bulgaria and the U.S. were put into the position of being members of different alliances at war with each other, while keeping diplomatic relations.

President Woodrow Wilson came under pressure from some members of Congress, particularly Senator Henry Cabot Lodge, and from former president Theodore Roosevelt, who demanded a declaration of war on Bulgaria and Germany's other allies. The New York Times accused Bulgaria of joining forces with the 'devil' and providing information to Germany. President Wilson drafted a statement to Congress in December 1917 which said "I... recommend that Congress immediately declare the United States in a state of war with Austria-Hungary, with Turkey and with Bulgaria".

The American Board of Commissioners for Foreign Missions and American philanthropist Cleveland Dodge, head of the board of Robert College, wrote to Wilson asking him not to declare war on Bulgaria, saying that it would have no effect on the war, but would harm the work of American missionaries, educational institutions, and American citizens in Bulgaria and Turkey. Wilson agreed to reconsider his proposal. In his final message to Congress delivered on December 4, Wilson called for a declaration of war against Austria-Hungary, but said, "The same logic would lead also to a declaration of war against Turkey and Bulgaria. They too, are tools of Germany. But they are mere tools and do not yet stand in the direct path of our proposed actions. We shall go wherever the necessities of this war carry us, but it seems to me that we should go only where immediate and practical considerations lead us and not heed any others". After holding hearings on the subject, Congress accepted Wilson's argument and declared war on Austria-Hungary, but not on Bulgaria or Turkey.

In Point Eleven of his Fourteen Points, given by Wilson to Congress on January 8, 1918, Wilson called for "the relations of the several Balkan states to one another determined by a friendly counsel along historically established lines of allegiance and nationality." In February 1918 he added four more principles, one of which said "Every territorial settlement involved in this war must be made in the interest and for the benefit of the population concerned." Bulgarians saw in these declarations the hope that the United States would look favorably on its hopes for the return of its territories.

Events in Bulgaria were strongly influenced by the Russian Revolution of February 1917, which stirred anti-monarchist and anti-war sentiment. In September 1918, there was a mutiny in the Bulgarian army, the so-called Vladaisko uprising and the combined forces of the Serbs, British, French and Greeks broke through Bulgarian lines on the Salonika front. Despite opposition from King Ferdinand, The Bulgarian Government of Prime Minister Malinov approached American diplomats about a possible withdrawal from the War, accepting the principals laid by President Wilson. From Sofia, Consul Murphy cabled to Washington, "Bulgaria accepts with good will the proposal that the President should be the arbiter of the Balkans." However, before the United States could take part in the negotiations, the Malinov government fell and was replaced by a government led by Agrarian Party leader Alexander Stambolyski. Stambolyski forced King Ferdinand to abdicate in favor of his son, Boris III, and signed an armistice with the Entente Powers.

== The interwar period (1919–1941) ==
=== The Peace Conference and the Treaty of Versailles ===
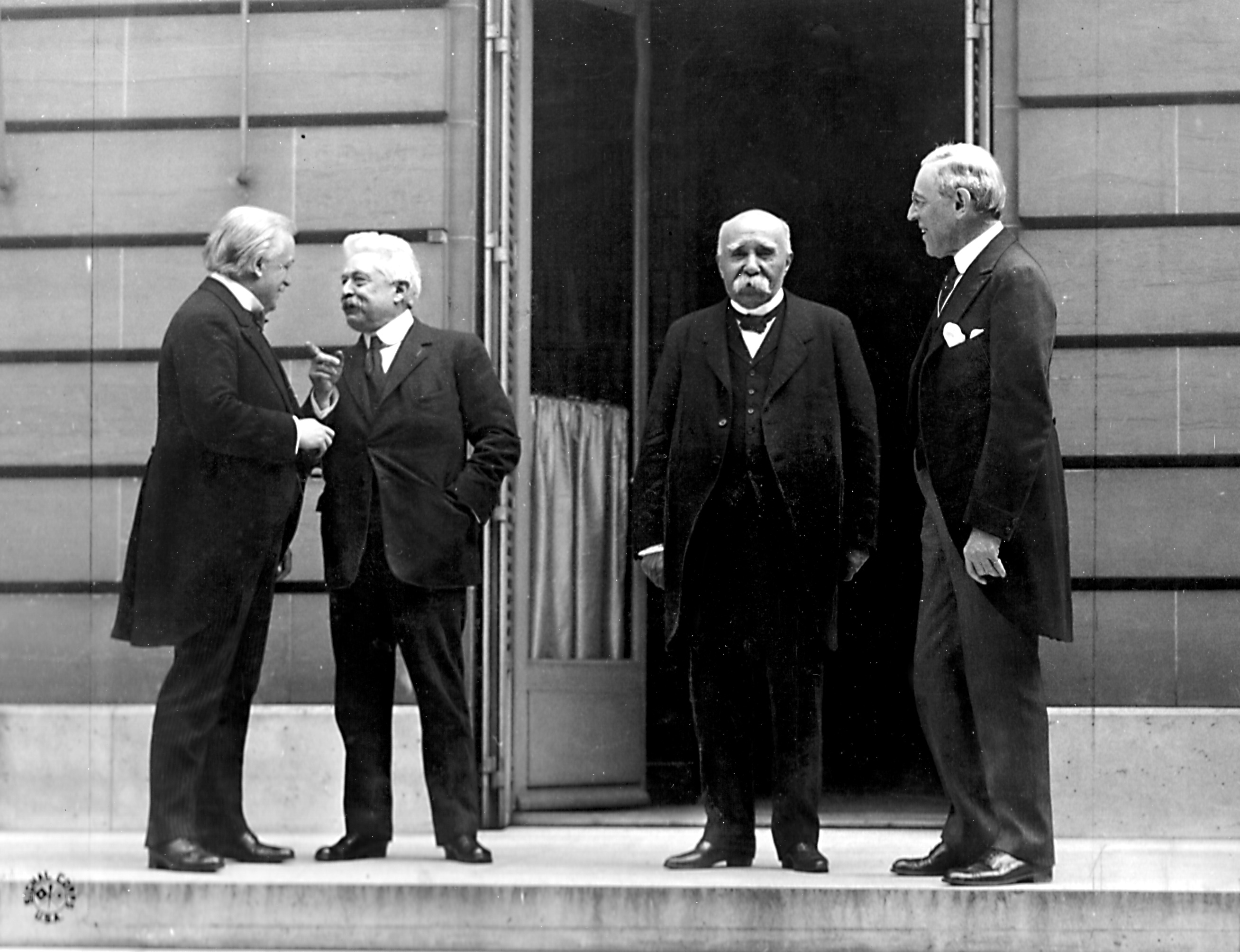
Left to Right, Prime Minister David Lloyd George of the United Kingdom, Vittorio Orlando of Italy, Prime Minister Georges Clemenceau of France, and President Woodrow Wilson

When negotiations for the future of Europe began in Paris in 1919, Bulgaria found itself among the defeated countries. Nonetheless, the Bulgarian government felt that Wilson and the United States would look favorably upon its territorial claims.

Wilson appointed a Commission of Inquiry to study the possible future map of the Balkans. The Commission concluded: "(1) that the area of annexed by Romania in the Dorbrudja is almost surely Bulgarian in character and should be returned; (2) that the boundary between Bulgaria Turkey should be restored to the Enos-Midia line as agreed upon at the conference in London; (3) that the south border of Bulgaria should be the coast of the Aegean Sea from Enos to the Gulf of Orfano, and should leave the mouth of the Struma River in Bulgarian territory; (4) that the best access to the sea for Serbia is through Saloniki; (5) that the final disposition of Macedonia cannot be determined without further inquiry; (6) that an independent Albania is almost certainly an indesirable political entity. We are strongly of the opinion that in the last analysis economic considerations will outweigh nationalistic affiliations in the Balkans and that a settlement which insures economic prosperity is most likely to be a lasting one."

Bulgaria's territorial claims were strongly resisted by Romania, Greece, Turkey, and particularly Serbia. By the time the final peace treaty between the Allies and Bulgaria was negotiated, President Wilson had returned to the United States, where he faced bitter opposition to his proposed League of Nations within the U.S. Senate.

On its proposals for restoring to Bulgaria the territory of southern Dobrudzha, largely inhabited by Bulgarians but given to Romania in 1913, and lands in Eastern Thrace along the Aegean Sea. The U.S. delegation faced the united opposition of France, Britain, Japan and Italy. The final treaty between the Allies and Bulgaria gave Greece formerly Bulgarian territories along the Aegean Sea in Thrace, with the promise that Bulgaria would have free access to the Aegean through Salonika, and through the Turkish Straits, which were to be administered by a newly created international state. North Macedonia became part of the new state of Yugoslavia.

In the midst of his defense of the Versailles Treaty, President Wilson suffered a stroke. Wilson was unwilling compromise with the Senate, and The Treaty was defeated in the Senate. In March 1921 Warren G. Harding became president, and the United States retreated into a policy of isolationism from European and Balkan affairs.

The Treaty of Versailles reduced the territory of Bulgaria, but did not fully resolve territorial conflicts in the Balkans. It created a powerful new state, Yugoslavia, next to Bulgaria, which continued to claim larger Macedonian territories. It resulted in a flood of Bulgarian refugees out of the Yugoslav part of Macedonia, Thrace, and of Greek refugees out of Bulgaria, and created tensions which would help lead to Bulgaria and the United States being on opposite sides in the Second World War.

=== Bulgarian-American relations between the Wars ===
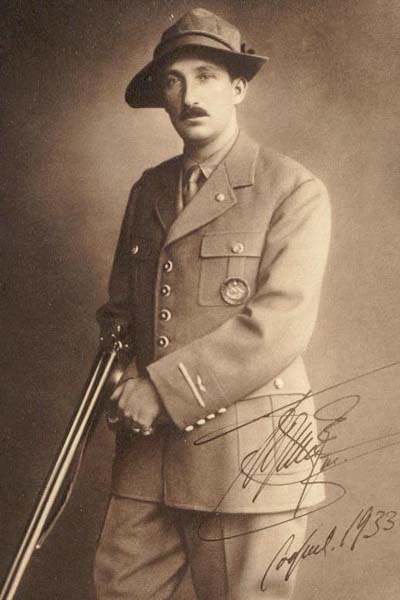
King Boris III

The period between 1919 and 1939 was extremely difficult for Bulgaria and the rest of Europe. It saw large dislocations of populations, economic depression, and the rise of extremist parties on the left and right.

Bulgaria was first led by Prime Minister Aleksandar Stamboliyski and his Agrarian Party. Stamboliyski's socialist reforms were resisted by Tsar Boris, and his policy of reconciliation with Yugoslavia was bitterly opposed by a nationalist political movement, the Internal Macedonian Revolutionary Organization (VMRO), started by Bulgarians from the region of Macedonia, after the war part of Yugoslavia, which demanded that Bulgaria reclaim Macedonia from Yugoslavia by force.

When Stamboliyski officially recognized the border with Yugoslavia and banned the VMRO in 1923, he was deposed in a violent coup and beheaded. The Communist Party was suppressed, and Communist Party leader Georgi Dimitrov fled through Yugoslavia to Austria.

Virtual civil war followed. The Communist Party or its allies made two attempts to kill King Boris, including a bombing of St. Nedelya Cathedral in 1925 which resulted in the death of 123 people. However, the Agrarian Party remained popular, and won the 1931 elections. As the effects of the worldwide repression reached Bulgaria, social division deepened. The Agrarian government was overthrown by a coup, backed by King Boris, in 1934. In 1935, King Boris banned all opposition parties, and took Bulgaria into an alliance with Nazi Germany and Fascist Italy. The signing of the Balkan Pact in 1938 with Greece and Yugoslavia gave Bulgaria more normal relations with its neighbors, but Bulgaria maintained its territorial claims to Yugoslav-held Macedonia, Greek-held Eastern Thrace and Romanian held Dobrudzha. (See History of Bulgaria.)

Pursuing its policy of isolationism, the United States played little role in the political events of the Balkans, but it did move toward more constructing more normal diplomatic relations with the changing Bulgarian governments. A series of treaties were signed and ratified between the two countries, including agreements for postal services, conciliation, arbitration, naturalization, and extradition.

== The growth of Bulgarian-American commerce ==
During the 1920s, Bulgaria experienced an economic boom, and trade with the United States began to increase. American firms built grain elevators, dockyards, and dock facilities at the port of Varna. In 1928 Bulgaria was the largest exporter of attar of roses (used to make perfume) to the United States, and also a major exporter of tobacco to the U.S. In 1922, the Bulgarian Finance Ministry made an agreement with the American Banknote Company to print a large quantity of Bulgarian currency in the United States.

There was even the beginning of a thriving copyright infringement of American movies in Bulgaria. On May 3, 1925, the New York Times reported: "Picture pirates keep American moving pictures agents on the jump in the Balkans. There are no copyright laws and treaty provisions which protect American films in Turkey, Romania and Bulgaria, and consequently those countries are the happy hunting ground for film thieves. A film stolen in transit is copied and the copies sold to the Balkan countries."

In 1928 Americans provided humanitarian assistance following a major earthquake in southern Bulgaria. American Foundations were also active in Bulgaria. The Rockefeller Foundation supported educational institutions in Bulgaria, constructed a building for the Faculty of Agronomy at the University of Sofia. The Rockefeller Foundation spent about three hundred thousand dollars in Bulgaria, sending thirty doctors to study in the United States, sharing the cost of establishing a National Health Institute, and carrying out a major campaign to eradicate malaria.

In 1925 there were only 125 trained nurses in Bulgaria. The American Red Cross organized a school of nursing to train new medical personnel. The Near East Foundation, founded in 1930 with the assets of the Near East Relief organization, built fourteen playgrounds in Sofia and thirty-four around the country.

American schools also continued to play an important role. In 1935 the American College in Sofia had 254 men students and 237 women students from all over Bulgaria, providing an American-style secondary education, complete with athletics, an orchestra and chorus, student council, and yearbook.

== Second World War ==
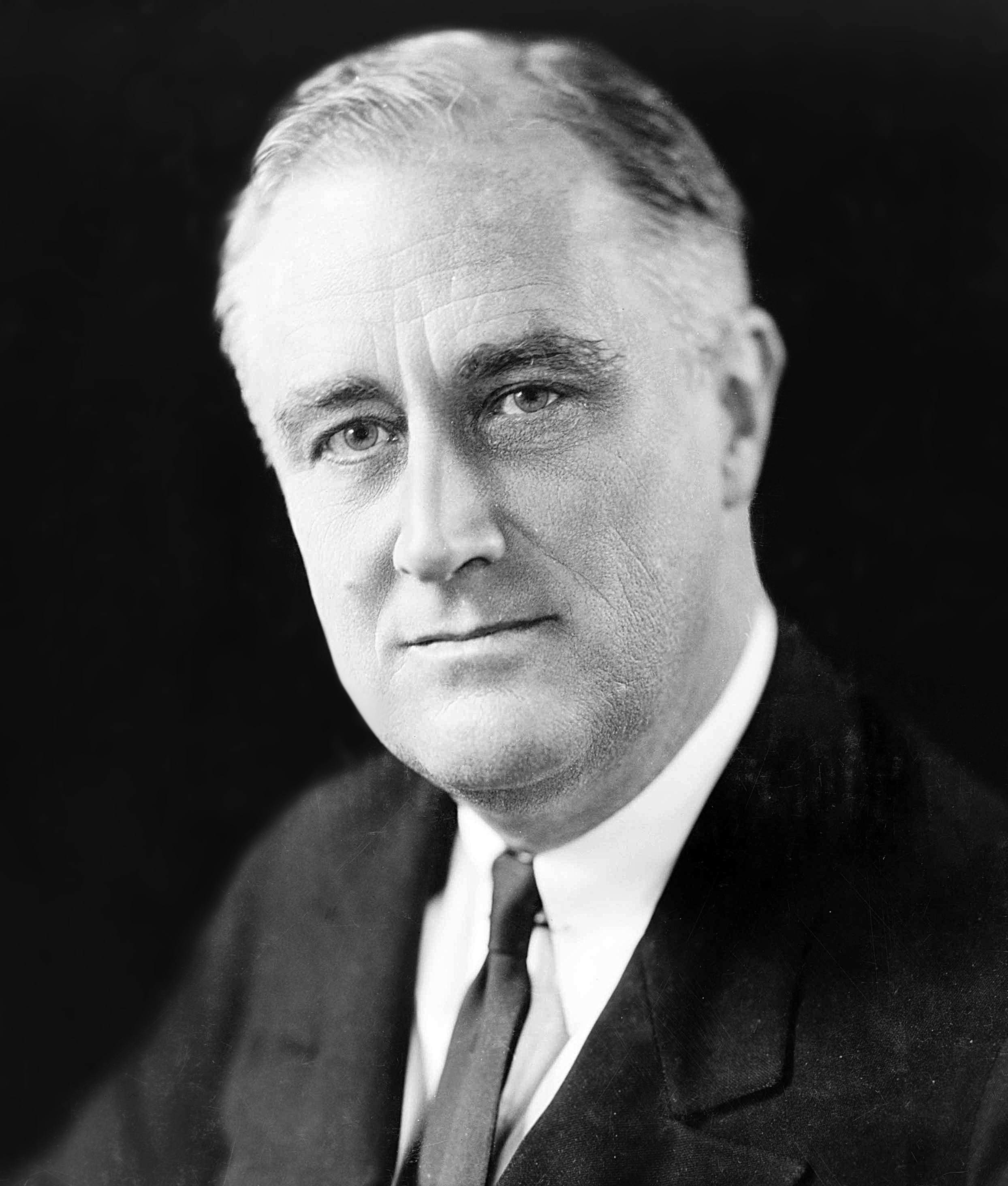
President Franklin Roosevelt

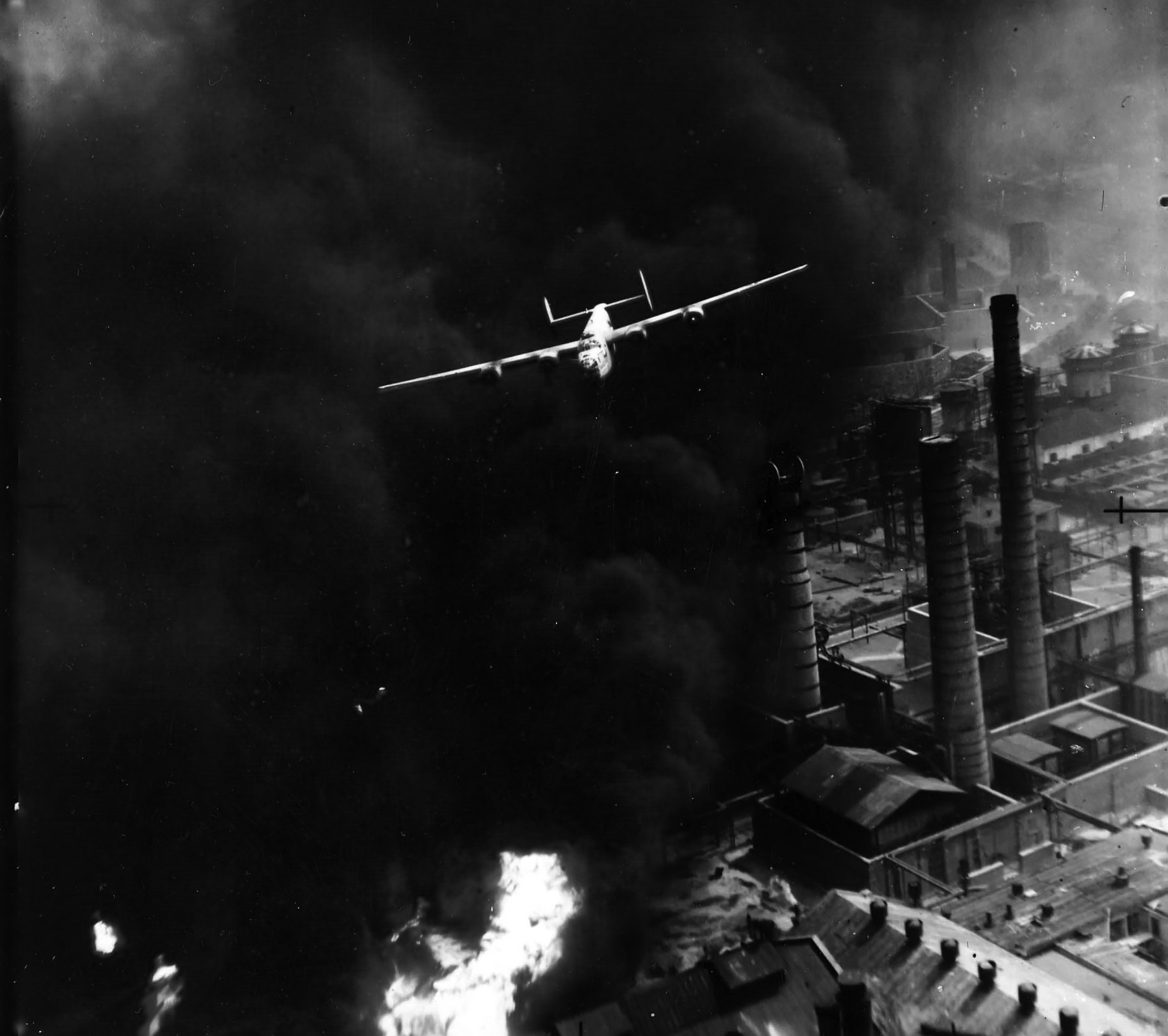
U.S. B-24 over Ploiești, Romania in August 1943. Several B-24s were shot down on their return flight by Bulgarian fighters

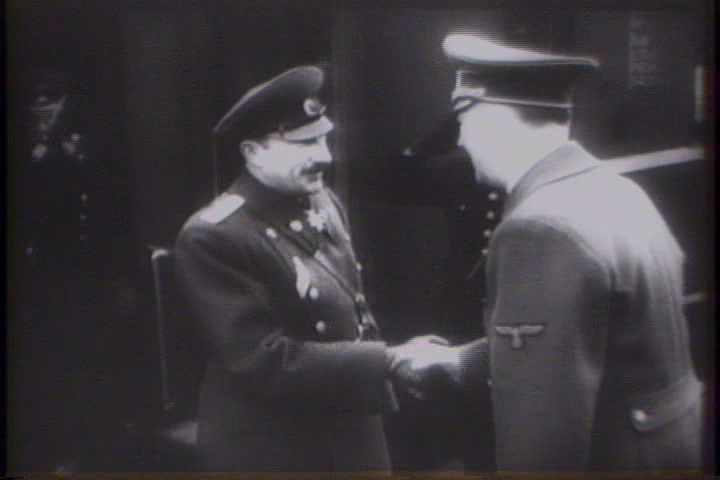
King Boris and Adolf Hitler, 1943

When World War II began in September 1939, both Bulgaria and the United States were neutral. As in World War I, Bulgaria looked for an ally that would help it regain lands it claimed in Yugoslavia, Romania and Greece. In September 1940, Bulgaria succeeded in negotiating, with the help of Germany, the return of Southern Dobruzha from Romania.

=== Bulgaria's involvement on the Axis' side ===
In March 1941, the German Army asked permission to move its troops through Bulgaria to attack Greece, which was successfully resisting an invasion by Germany's ally, Italy. King Boris granted the German request, and on March 1, 1941, Bulgaria permitted the Germans to pass through its territory and joined the Axis powers.

Bulgaria was passive while the combined forces of Germany, Italy and Hungary invaded and defeated Yugoslavia and contemporaneously Germany invaded Greece on 6 April. On 20 April 1941, Bulgarian forces entered Greece on the heels of the Wehrmacht without fighting and went on to occupy the territories of the present-day region of Eastern Macedonia and Thrace, except for the Evros prefecture, up to the Aegean Coast, including the islands of Thasos and Samothrace. Bulgaria also occupied most of what is now the Republic of North Macedonia and much of South-Eastern Serbia, then in the Kingdom of Yugoslavia. Bulgaria did not participate in the German attack on the Soviet Union in June 1941, and did not break diplomatic relations with the Soviet Union.

Following Germany′s declaration of war on the United States on 11 December 1941, Bulgaria followed the German lead on 13 December. The United States did not immediately declare war on Bulgaria, however. Only in June 1942, did President Roosevelt call for a declaration of war. On June 2, 1942, President Roosevelt sent the following message to Congress:

To the Congress:
The Governments of Bulgaria, Hungary, and Romania have declared war against the United States. I realize that the three Governments took this action not upon their own initiative or in response to the wishes of their own peoples but as the instruments of Hitler. These three Governments are now engaged in military activities directed against the United Nations and are planning an extension of these activities.
Therefore, I recommend that the Congress recognize a state of war between the United States and Bulgaria, between the United States and Hungary, and between the United States and Romania ."

In Spring 1943, the Bulgarian government ordered the deportation of the Jewish population of Bulgaria. The deportation of Jews from Bulgarian territory was resisted and eventually blocked by protests by the Bulgarian Orthodox Church and members of parliament. The Jews of territories occupied by Bulgarian forces in Greece and Macedonia, however, were rounded up by Bulgarian troops and sent to Nazi death camps. (See History of the Jews in North Macedonia.)

=== Combat during WWII ===
The first combat between American and Bulgarian military forces took place during the American raid on the Romanian oil refinery complex of Ploiești in 1943. On August 1, 1943, One hundred and seventy-seven B-24 Liberators with 1,726 crew members took off from Libya with the destination of the Ploiești refinery complex in Romania, which was reported to be producing sixty percent of the gasoline and petroleum products used by the German war effort.

The bombers flew over Greece and Bulgaria on their way to the target. Because of the distance - a thousand miles - they had no fighter escort. Because of clouds over Bulgaria, many of the planes became scattered. German radar detected the incoming aircraft, and the anti-aircraft defenses were warned when the bombers arrived for their low-level attack.

The raid caused serious damage to the refinery complex, but losses were very high - fifty-four aircraft and 532 crew members were lost.

During the return flight, several aircraft crashed in Bulgaria. One aircraft was intercepted and shot down by four Bulgarian fighters, crashing in a field near the village of Suhozem in Plovdiv Province. One crewmen died, as did seven villagers working in the field. (See Operation Tidal Wave.)

A few months later, Bulgaria itself became a target. Between November 14, 1943 and January 10, 1944, The United States Army Air Force bombed Sofia six times. (The daylight raid on January 10, 1944 was also followed by a British nighttime bombing.) The raids killed an estimated 1,374 people, and damaged many downtown buildings. The National Library was destroyed and the National Theater and Museum of Natural History and other important buildings downtown were badly damaged. Thousands of civilians were evacuated to the countryside. (See Bombing of Sofia in World War II.)

Many American planes were lost in the raids, some shot down by Bulgarian pilots. Between 1943 and 1944, 329 Allied pilots and air crew from seven nations, mostly American, were captured and confined in a prisoner-of-war camp located within the boundaries of what is today the Shumensko Plateau Natural Park, near the city of Shumen. They were released on September 8, 1944.

=== Political situation in Bulgaria after the formal start of the war ===
The raids shocked the Bulgarian public and government, which had expected to escape the direct impact of the war. Soon afterwards, Bulgaria engaged in informal diplomatic contacts with the United States. including negotiations in Cairo, to bring about Bulgaria's withdrawal from the Axis.

The Communists, Agrarian Party and their allies, along with some army officers, had begun to organize a resistance, the Fatherland Front, against the Germans and Bulgarian Government in 1943.

King Boris died suddenly in August 1943, after visiting Adolf Hitler in Germany. He was replaced by his six-year-old son, Simeon II, under a regents, among them the King's uncle, Prince Kirill.

As the Red Army approached the northern border of Bulgaria in September 1944, the Bulgarian government announced that it was withdrawing unilaterally from the Axis, withdrew its troops from Greece and Yugoslavia, and then declared war on Germany, hoping to avoid a Soviet occupation. The Red Army continued to advance, however, crossing the Danube in September and entering Sofia on September 16, 1944. The Fatherland Front staged a coup d'état and the Communists became part of the new government.

=== The Armistice between Bulgaria and the Allies ===
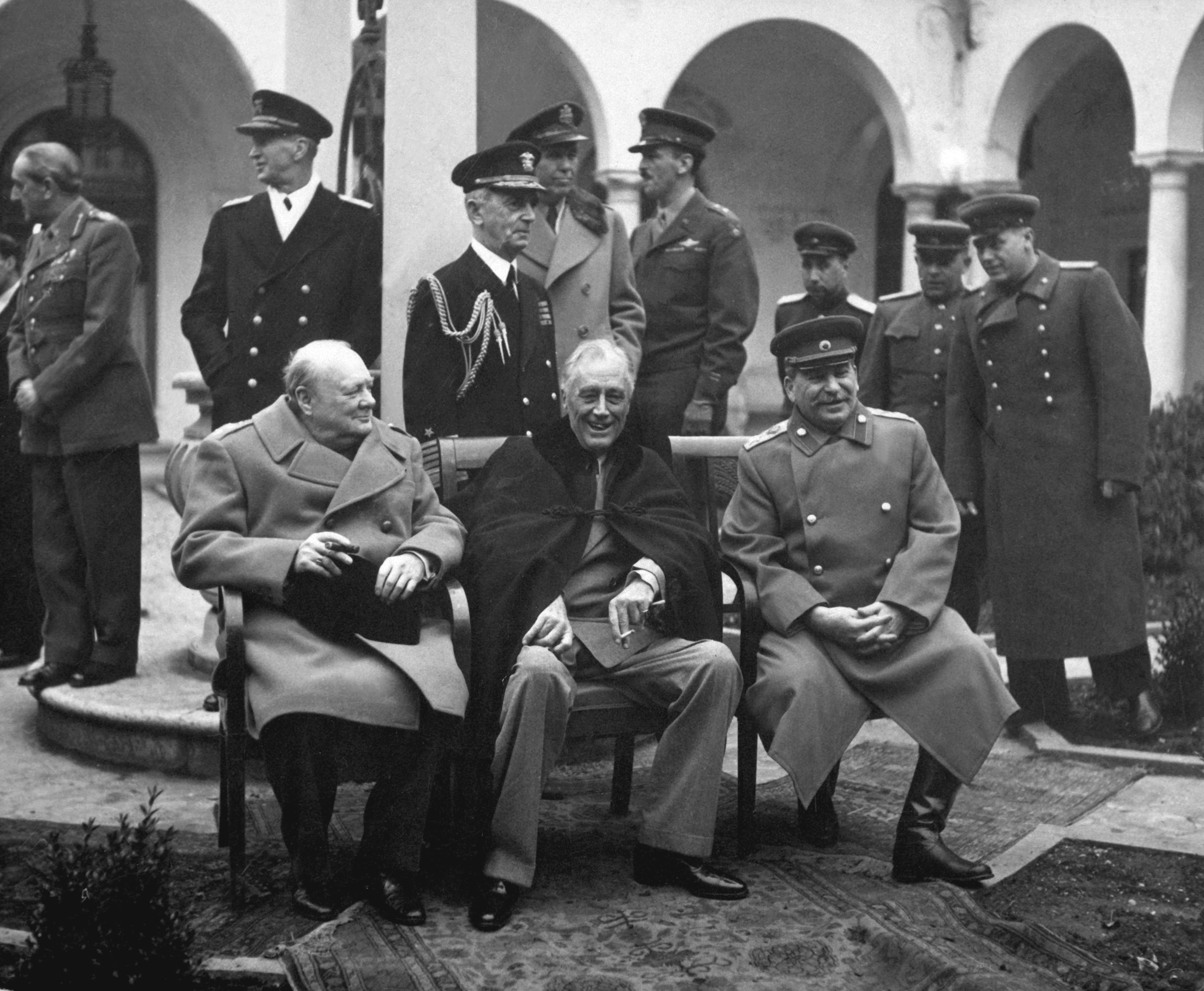
The "Big Three" at the Yalta Conference, Winston Churchill, Franklin Delano. Roosevelt and Joseph Stalin.

On October 28, in Moscow, Bulgarian foreign minister Stainov signed an Armistice with representatives of the U.S., Britain, and the Soviet Union. Lieutenant General James Gammell, representative of the Supreme Allied Commander for the Mediterranean, and George Kennan, the U.S. Charge D'Affaires in Moscow, signed for the United States.

Under the Armistice, Bulgaria promised to put its armed forces under Allied Command until Germany was defeated, and then to submit to an Allied Control Commission. Bulgaria was also obliged to withdraw its soldiers and government officials from the parts of Greece and Yugoslavia which had been occupied by its forces, to move out Bulgarians who had been settled on these territories after January 1941, and to repeal the laws by which these territories had been annexed to Bulgaria.

By the time that Joseph Stalin, Winston Churchill and President Roosevelt met in Yalta in March 1945, Bulgaria was occupied by the Soviet Army, and a pro-Soviet government had been installed. Bulgaria was discussed only once at Yalta Conference, when British Foreign Secretary Eden said that Soviet-occupied Bulgaria should not be allowed to form an alliance with Yugoslavia, where Marshal Tito was establishing a Communist regime. According to the Minutes of the Conference:

"There was an exchange of views between the Foreign Secretaries on the question of the desirability of a Yugoslav-Bulgarian pact of alliance. The question at issue was whether a state still under an armistice regime could be allowed to enter into a treaty with another state. Mr. Eden suggested that the Bulgarian and Yugoslav Governments should be informed that this could not be approved. Mr. Stettinius suggested that the British and American Ambassadors should discuss the matter further with Mr. Molotov in Moscow. Mr. Molotov agreed with the proposal of Mr. Stettinius."

== The Cold War (1947–1989) ==
=== The beginning of the Cold War in Bulgaria ===
Though the Communist Party formally was only one partner in the new coalition government, they, along with the Soviet representatives, were the real power in Bulgaria. They created a People's Militia to harass the opposition parties and gradually purged their rivals.

In February 1945 the Regent, Prince Kirill, was arrested, along with dozens of ministers and officials of the old regime, tried for war crimes, and executed.

Following the German surrender in May 1945, an Allied Control Commission was established in Sofia. Maynard Barnes, the U.S. representative in Sofia, attempted to persuade the government to follow democratic principles, but he had little success.

In September 1946, the monarchy was officially abolished through a plebiscite, and King Simeon II was exiled. A Communist Government under President Vasil Kolarov and Georgi Dimitrov took power. The leader of the Agrarian Party, Nikola Petkov, who refused to cooperate with the Communists, was arrested and executed. By the end of 1947, Bulgaria was firmly in Soviet orbit.

=== Bulgaria breaks diplomatic relations ===
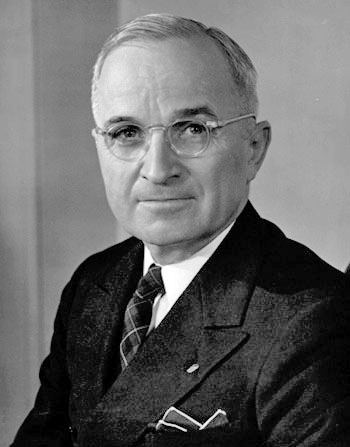
President Harry Truman

When the State Department appointed Donald Heath as U.S. representative to Bulgaria in September 1947, he found the Dimitrov government, following the Stalinist line, was increasingly hostile to the United States and the West. The announcement by President Harry S. Truman in 1947 of the policy, under which the United States would support the Greek Government against Communist rebels backed by Yugoslav dictator Josip Broz Tito, further increased tensions in the region.

Georgi Dimitrov died in July 1949 to be succeeded by another Stalinist, Valko Chervenkov. Meanwhile, there had emerged a momentous split between Stalin and Tito, who sought to pursue his version of socialism in Yugoslavia. The Bulgarian Government remained loyal to Stalin. A purge was launched against suspected "Titoists" in the Bulgarian Government, leading to removal of between 60,000 and 70,000 Communist Party members, and to the arrest, trial and execution in December 1949 of Deputy Prime Minister Traicho Kostov.

During Kostov's trial for treason, American Minister Heath was frequently mentioned as a contact of Kostov. He was blamed for Kostov's alleged plot to overthrow the Bulgarian government, and for using the American Legation as a center of espionage. On 19 January 1950, Bulgaria declared Heath persona non grata and severed diplomatic relations with the United States on 20 February. The United States announced the suspension of diplomatic relations with Bulgaria the following day, with Heath leaving the country on 24 February. Heath and the forty-three members of the U.S. legation boarded the Orient Express on February 23 and left for Turkey. The Bulgarian Government denounced the break in relations as a new stage in "the fight of the American imperialists against the front of peace and democracy." Thereafter the Polish Embassy in Washington looked after Bulgarian interests in the United States, and the Swiss Embassy in Sofia protected American interests in Bulgaria.

In the months that followed, Communist Party leader Chervenkov continued to follow the Stalinist model, rushing industrial development and collectivizing agriculture. The Orthodox Patriarch was sent to a monastery, and the church was put under state control. An estimated twelve thousand people were sent to labor camps between the end of World War Two and the death of Stalin in 1953. (See History of Communist Bulgaria.)

=== The United States and the regime of Todor Zhivkov ===
After the death of Stalin in 1953, the Bulgarian Communist Party began looking for a new leader to replace the rigid Chervenkov. In March 1954 it found a forty-one-year-old politburo member, Todor Zhivkov, who had commanded the People's Militia in Sofia at the end of World War II. Zhivkov remained Party Secretary for thirty-three years, one of the longest rule of any Soviet-bloc leader.

Zhivkov modified some Stalinist policies, officially "regretting" the trial and execution of Kostov and other alleged "Titoists," and closing some labor camps, but the regime continued to harshly repress any signs of dissent. Bulgaria did not experience anti-communist uprisings of the kind that rocked Berlin and Hungary in 1956 or Prague in 1968.

Zhivkov maintained a strict and repressive Soviet-style regime at home, but he also tried, following the lead of Soviet leader Nikita Khrushchev, to build better relations with the United States. In 1957, he gave an interview to New York Times correspondent Harrison Salisbury, his first interview to an American journalist, calling for immediate resumption of diplomatic relations with the United States. He also called for more trade, and educational and cultural exchanges. Missions were reopened in the two countries in 1959.

In September 1960, Zhivkov visited the United States to speak, along with dozens of other world leaders, at the opening of the General Assembly of the United Nations. Zhivkov spent nearly a month in the United States. He visited food processing plants, and also visited Atlantic City, where he was impressed by the giant resort hotels. He told reporters that Bulgaria was considering the construction of one or two hotels of eight to ten stories on the Black Sea coast, similar to those he had seen in Atlantic City.

In his interviews with American reporters, Zhivkov denied that Bulgaria was a puppet state of the Soviet Union. "Puppet? Not true!" Zhivkov said to Edwin Gritz of the Washington Post "A great slander. The Soviet Union is helping us to build an independent economy."

In late November 1966, the U.S. and Bulgaria raised the level of their diplomatic missions from legations to Embassies, with an exchange of Ambassadors. Economic, technical, scientific and cultural contacts slowly were resumed.

Radio Voice of America logo

Despite his new diplomacy, Zhivkov allowed no dissent or free speech in Bulgaria. Bulgarian-language broadcasts of the Voice of America were jammed. An American diplomat was arrested for passing out American literature in the town of Plovdiv in 1960, and any contact with Americans was dangerous for ordinary Bulgarians.

Zhivkov cultivated personal relationships with Soviet leaders Nikita Khrushchev and Leonid Brezhnev (whom he took hunting in his hunting preserve near Razgrad), and maintained extremely close relations with the Soviet Union. In 1957, about one thousand Bulgarian students a year were studying in Soviet universities, and an additional ten thousand young Bulgarians a year went to the Soviet Union to work.

Bulgaria became a member of the Warsaw Pact on May 14, 1955. Though no Soviet troops were stationed on Bulgarian soil, in 1968, Zhivkov sent a Bulgarian division to join Polish, Hungarian and Soviet troops to crush a popular uprising in Prague. In 1978, the Bulgarian secret police were implicated in the assassination in London of Georgi Markov, a Bulgarian dissident who was a correspondent for the BBC World Service, Deutsche Welle radio and the U.S. sponsored Radio Free Europe. Markov was assassinated with a poisoned umbrella on September 7, Zhivkov's birthday.

== Democracy and partnership after 1989 ==
The rise of democratic movements across Eastern Europe in the 1980s, the arrival in power in Moscow of Mikhail Gorbachev in 1985, and the fall of the Berlin Wall in 1989, led to the downfall of Todor Zhivkov, who resigned as Communist Party leader on November 10, 1989.

US Agency for International Development in Bulgaria

He was succeeded by a new generation of leaders, who turned Bulgaria toward democracy and a market economy. Opposition parties and independent media began to spring up in Sofia, and the new leaders began to re-orient Bulgaria toward Western Europe and the United States.

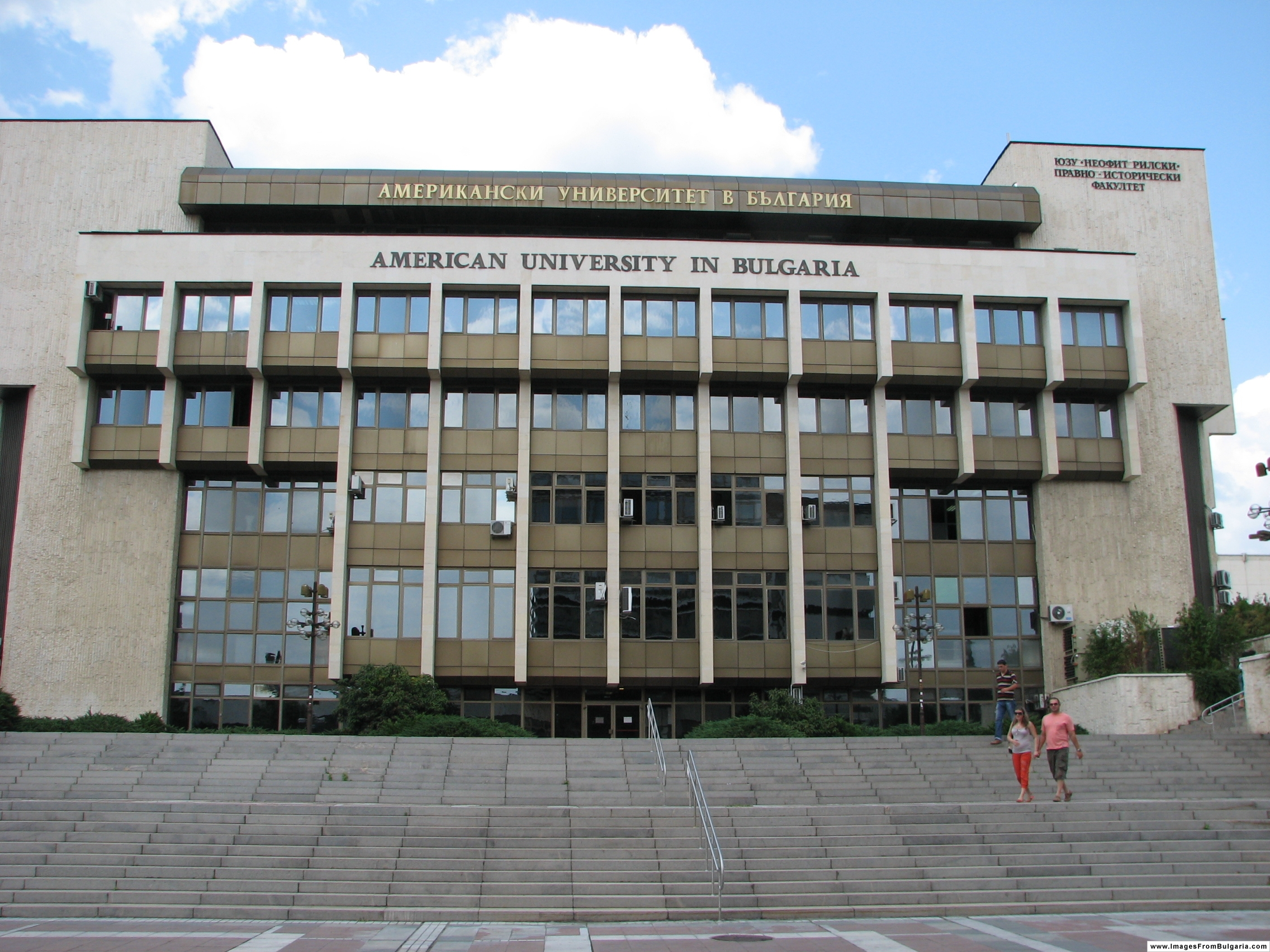
American University in Bulgaria (In Blagoevgrad)

The U.S. Congress responded to the changes in Bulgaria and Eastern Europe by passing the Support for East European Democracies (SEED) Act in 1989, designed to help Central and East European countries to build democratic institutions. U.S. Government foreign assistance to Bulgaria totaled over $600 million through 2007. The American University in Bulgaria was founded in 1991, with assistance from the United States Government, to provide a liberal arts education to students from Bulgaria and other Balkan countries. Peace Corps Volunteers began to arrive in Bulgaria to teach English and aid in community development, and a Fulbright Program Commission was created to establish university exchanges.

The Bulgarian elections of June 1990 and October 1991 brought a new government into power that favored closer relations with NATO, the EU, and the United States. This set of events arose following a pressure campaign led by American and European officials that sought to isolate the victorious Bulgarian Socialist Party from office following their victory in the 1990 Bulgarian Constitutional Assembly election. Bulgarian president Zhelyu Zhelev visited the United States and had talks with U.S. President George H. W. Bush in 1990, followed by the official visit to Sofia by U.S. Vice-President Dan Quayle. In 1999, President Bill Clinton became the first sitting U.S. President to visit Bulgaria, speaking to a huge crowd in Nevsky Square. To show their commitment to closer relations with the United States and earnest desire to become a member of NATO and the European Union, Bulgaria contributed a contingent of troops to the US led NATO peace keeping force in Bosnia-Herzegovina, beginning in 1996 and throughout that mission, which ended in 2004, followed by continued participation in the European Union Force (EUFOR) ready reaction force stationed at the former NATO Camp Butmir, in Sarajevo, Bosnia-Herzegovina.

== Bulgaria and America during the Kosovo crisis ==
During the Kosovo crisis in 1999, when NATO launched air strikes against Yugoslavia, the center-right government in Bulgaria took the side of NATO. During the aerial bombardment, four NATO missiles accidentally landed in Bulgaria. On April 29, 1999, a NATO anti-radar missile missed its target in Yugoslavia and hit a house in Gorna Banja, a suburb of Sofia, thirty miles away. The pro-western cabinet favored opening Bulgaria's airspace to NATO, while the Socialist opposition resisted and organized protest marches. In a poll, 70% were against the war and this number increased to over 80% by the end of the conflict. The BBC reported on May 1, 1999 that "the Bulgarian public is divided between a desire to join NATO and the European Union and sympathy for fellow Slavs and Christian Orthodox Serbs."

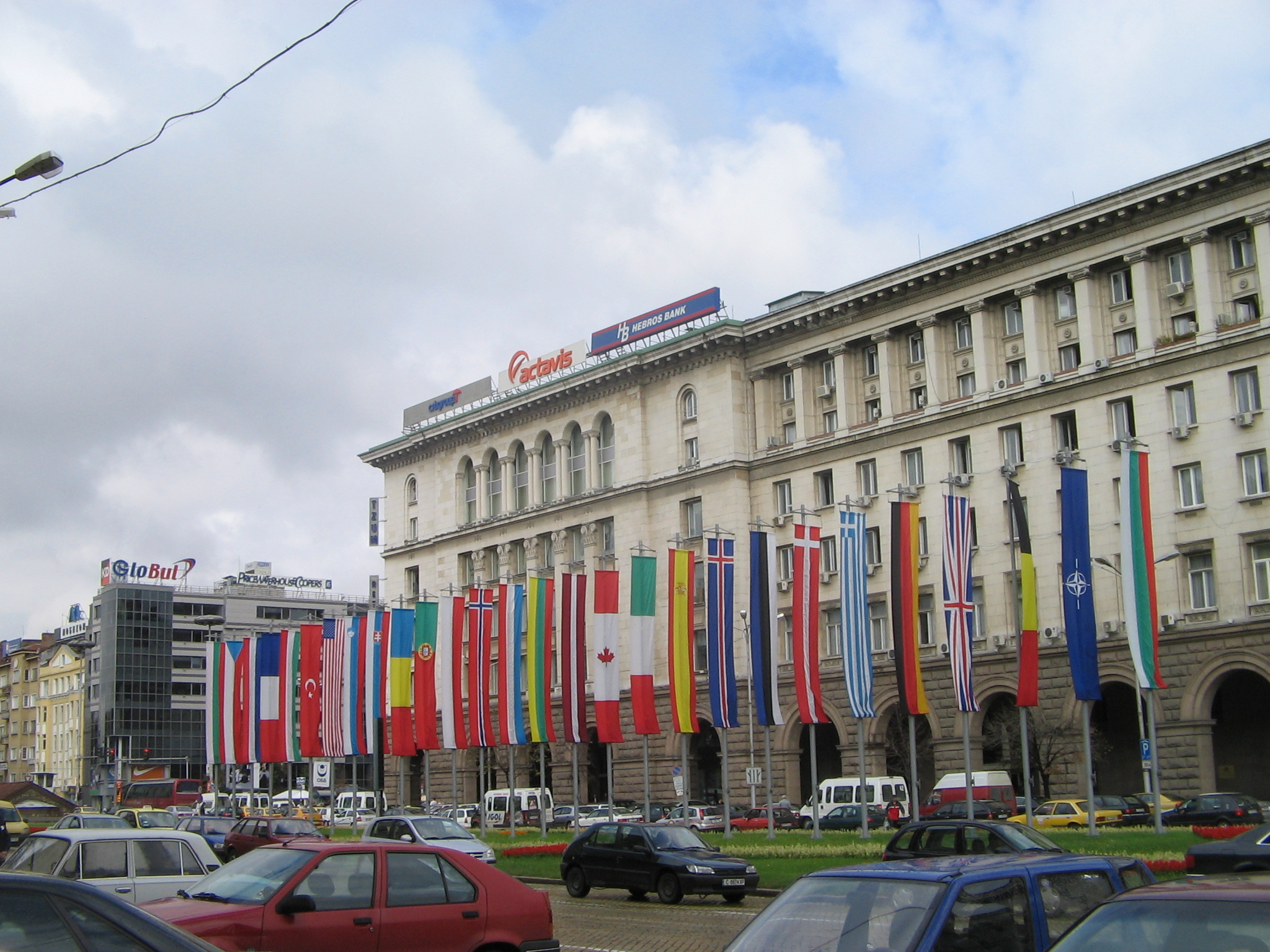
NATO member flags in Sofia, Bulgaria

Bulgarian foreign minister Nadezhda Mihailova told a NATO conference that it was impossible to be neutral over Kosovo; she said one was either in favor or against the Yugoslav policy of intolerance. She also repeated Bulgaria's policy that Balkan borders should remain unchanged. She stated, "we want no more Balkanization of the Balkans."

While the Bulgarian government supported NATO, it refused to take large numbers of Kosovo refugees. According to the UNHCR, about 2500 Kosovars crossed into Bulgaria. Much larger numbers entered North Macedonia and Albania.

The government followed a strongly pro-NATO position despite the overwhelming opposition to the war in Bulgaria. The Bulgarian Government also began to process of applying for NATO membership, and membership in the European Union, with the support of the United States.

== Bulgaria and the United States after 9/11 ==
Following the September 11 attacks on the United States in 2001, the Bulgarian government contributed troops to the NATO contingent in Afghanistan which overthrew the Taliban. The Bulgarian Armed Forces continued to provide a contingent of Soldiers (a reinforced company) to the International Stability Armed Forces (ISAF) under NATO command in Afghanistan through December 2014.

Starting in September 2001 and concluding in November 2005, the United States Department of Defense, in cooperation with the Department of State and US Ambassador, Jim Padrew, began advising the Bulgarian Ministry of Defense in defense reform in order to assist, train, and prepare the Bulgarian Ministry of Defense and Armed Forces for full membership in NATO. This Defense Cooperation initiative, the Joint Force Modernization Program, had the support of both countries' governments.

In July 2003, after the United States and its allies invaded Iraq, Bulgaria deployed about four hundred soldiers to the 9,200 member multi-national force under Polish command. The Bulgarian battalion provided logistical support and did guard duty in southern Iraq. The Bulgarian contingent suffered thirteen soldiers and six civilians killed, before it was withdrawn by the Socialist-led coalition government in December 2005. Hungary and Ukraine pulled out soldiers at the same time. However, in 2006, the Bulgarian Parliament voted 151 to 15 to send 120 soldiers and 34 support staff to guard the Ashraf refugee camp north of Baghdad.

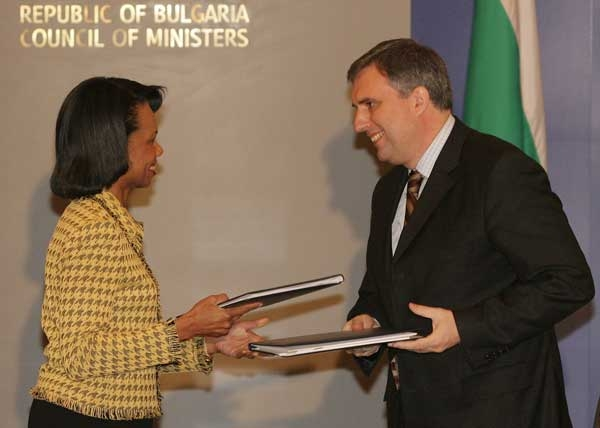
US Secretary of State Rice and Bulgarian Foreign Affairs Minister Kalfin sign the Defense Cooperation Agreement in December, 2005

In March 2004, Bulgaria formally became a member of NATO. In December 2005, U.S. Secretary of State Rice and Bulgarian foreign minister Kalfin signed a Defense Cooperation Agreement which permitted U.S. military forces to establish Bulgarian-American Joint Military Facilities, whereby American soldiers could train at three Bulgarian military bases.

Poster advertising 2008 Summer Work-Travel Program

Bulgaria joined the European Union on January 1, 2007. On June 11–12, 2007, President George W. Bush visited Sofia to meet with Bulgarian president Georgi Parvanov, to discuss greater military and political cooperation. President Bush praised Bulgaria for its democratic government and ethnic tolerance, which he said could serve as a model for other countries in the Balkans.

In 2007 U.S. Ambassador John Beyrle toured several cities in the United States with Bulgarian Ambassador to the United States Elena Poptodorova, to encourage more American investment in Bulgaria. He also encouraged the Bulgarian Government step up its fight against corruption and organized crine.

Bulgaria continues to participate actively in military missions and to have a close security partnership with NATO and the European Union. As of October 2007, Bulgaria had 380 soldiers taking part in the NATO Mission in Afghanistan; 152 soldiers serving with the U.S.-led coalition in Iraq; 35 to 40 soldiers serving on a NATO mission in Kosovo; and about one hundred soldiers on an EU-led mission in Bosnia.

The U.S. Summer Work-Travel Program is another important part of the relationship between the two countries. In 2007, about ten thousand Bulgarian students received visas for summer jobs across the United States.

== Embassy ==
=== In the U.S. ===
The Embassy of Bulgaria in Washington, D.C. is the Republic of Bulgaria's diplomatic mission to the United States. It is located at 1621 22nd Street N.W. in Washington, D.C.'s Kalorama neighborhood. The current Bulgarian Ambassador to the United States is Georgi Panayotov.

At the initiative of the President of Bulgaria Zhelyu Zhelev a monument to Vasil Levski was erected in front of the embassy in Washington in 1996.

=== Gallery ===
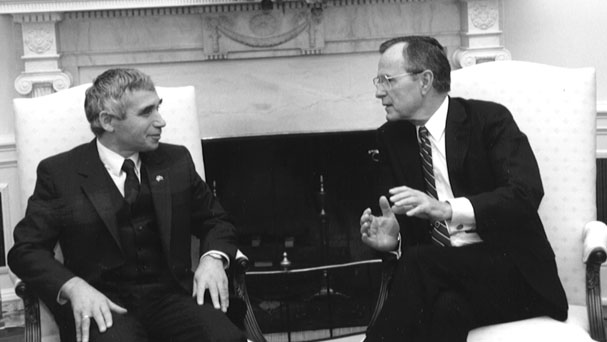
Zhelyu Zhelev, the first democratically elected president of Bulgaria with George H. W. Bush (right) in 1990.

== Resident diplomatic missions ==
- Bulgaria has an embassy in Washington, D.C. and consulates-general in Chicago, Los Angeles and New York City.
- the United States has an embassy in Sofia.

== See also ==
- Bulgaria–United States trade relations
- Bulgarian Americans
- Foreign relations of the United States
- Foreign relations of Bulgaria
- US–EU relations
- Bulgarian-American Joint Military Facilities
- Bulgarian-American Trade Relations
- United States Ambassadors to Bulgaria
- Bulgarian Ambassadors to the United States

== Sources ==
- Altankov, Nikolay G. The Bulgarian-Americans. Palo Alto, Calif.: Ragusan Press, 1979.
- Auerbach, Susan (ed.). Encyclopedia of Multiculturalism. New York: Marshall Cavendish, 1994.
- Carlson, Claudia and David Allen. The Bulgarian Americans. New York: Chelsea House, 1990. ISBN 0-87754-865-X
- Clark, James F., The Pen and the Sword, Studies in Bulgarian History, East European Monographs, Boulder, 1988.
- Moody, Suzanna, Joel Wurl; Rudolph J Vecoli (eds.). The Immigration History Research Center: A Guide to Collections. New York: Greenwood Press, 1991.
- Petkov, Petko M. (1991). The United States and Bulgaria in World War I. Boulder: Eastern European Monographs. ISBN 9780880332033.
- Riggs, Thomas. Gale Encyclopedia of Multicultural America, Vol. 1. 3rd ed. Farmington Hills: Gale, 2000.
- Yankoff, Peter Dimitrov. Peter Menikoff: The Story of a Bulgarian Boy in the Great American Melting Pot. Nashville, Tenn.: Cokesbury Press, 1928.
