= Bulgaria–United States trade relations =

Bilateral trade relations

Bulgarian-American trade has grown steadily since Bulgaria changed from a socialist to a market economy, and particularly since Bulgaria joined NATO in 2004 and the European Union in 2007. In 2007, the first and second largest investments in the Bulgarian economy were made by U.S. firms.

U.S. investments made in Bulgaria between September 1992 and September 2006 amounted to a total of over one billion dollars, which made the United States the eighth largest investor in the country. During the same period, the U.S. was Bulgaria's ninth largest trading partner. The U.S. is the only non-EU country in the top ten foreign investors in Bulgaria.

Bilateral trade has been steadily growing since 1999. Two-way merchandise trade is just under $1 billion with US exports to Bulgaria reaching $491 million and Bulgarian exports at $439 million in 2006.

Bulgaria's exports to the United States amounted to three percent of its total exports in 2005, and the share of imports from the USA stood at two percent.

In 2007, U.S. Ambassador John Beyrle and Bulgarian Ambassador to the United States Elena Poptodorova toured several U.S. cities to encourage more and investment and trade between the U.S. and Bulgaria.

== U.S. Direct Investment in Bulgaria ==
U.S. Direct Investment Inflow in Bulgaria by year in USD millions
Year	1993	1994	1995	1996	1997	1998	1999	2000	2001	2002	2003	2004	2005	2006	Total
Amount	10.5	16.2	16.1	20.7	46.6	38.6	54.7	58.2	44.5	56.2	128.0	145.3	71.1	116.0	822.6

Source: 1992-1998- Ministry of Finance; 1999-2006 – Bulgarian National Bank

== Major U.S. Investments in Bulgaria (2007) ==
AIG (telecommunications) $2.billion (est.)

AES Corporation (energy generation) - $1.4 billion

Gramercy (real estate and portfolio investments $800 million (est.)

AES Corporation Wind farm project consortium with Geo Energy - $450 million

Tishman Realty & Construction (real estate) - $370 million

American Standard (kitchen and bath fittings and fixtures - $239.7 million

GE Real Estate (real estate) - $80 million

Kraft Foods (food) -$38.0 million

Alcoa (consumer products) - $30 million

Nu Image (movie production) $28 million

News Corp (media and television) $22.8 million

Johnson Controls (electronics) - $7 million

Other major investors whose investment totals are not disclosed include:

Microsoft (call center)

Hewlett Packard (European Service Center)

IBM (Global Service Center)

== Trade Agreements Between Bulgaria and the United States ==
Trade between Bulgaria and the United States is regulated by the Agreement on the Trade Relations (1991), which accords most favoured nation (MFN) level of treatment to goods and products from both countries. Other agreements are the Treaty Concerning the Encouragement and Reciprocal Protection of Investments, the Generalized System of Preferences – GSP - and the World Trade Organization Agreement. The Treaty on Avoidance of Double Taxation is in process of ratification.

== See also ==
- Foreign relations of the United States
- Foreign relations of Bulgaria
- Bulgarian-American relations
- United States Ambassadors to Bulgaria
