= Tihomir Stoytchev =

Bulgarian diplomat

His Excellency Tihomir Stoytchev
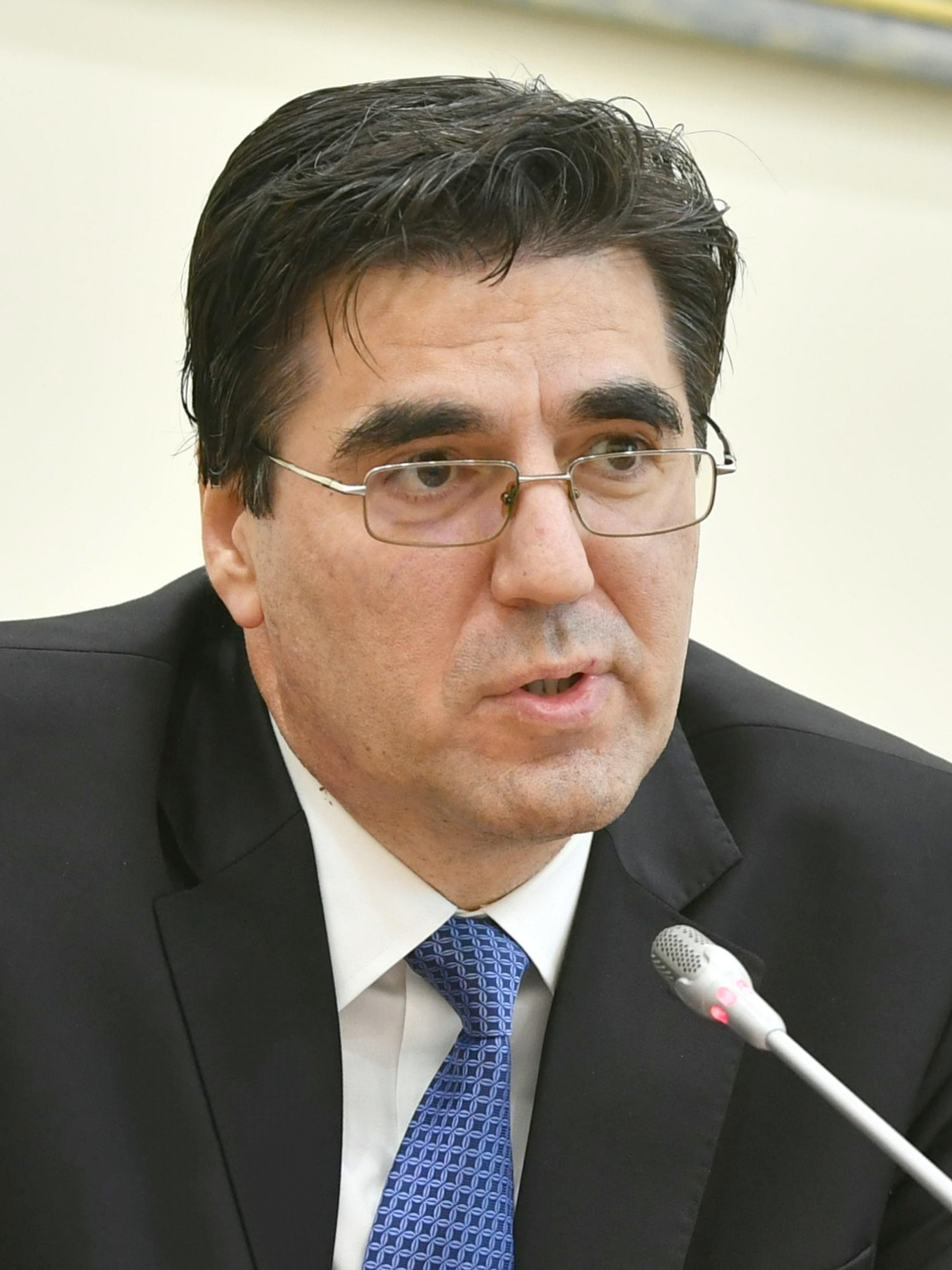

Bulgaria Ambassador to the United States
- In office 28 June 2016 – 22 March 2022
- President: Rosen Plevneliev; Rumen Radev
- Preceded by: Elena Poptodorova
- Succeeded by: Georgi Panayotov

Personal details
- Born: 1962 (age 63–64) Kostenets, Bulgaria
- Spouse: Lubka Stoytcheva
- Education: Sofia University

Tihomir Stoytchev (Bulgarian: Тихомир Стойчев, born in August 1962 at Kostenets) is a Bulgarian diplomat, who has served as Bulgaria's Ambassador to the United States. He is currently serving as the Deputy Minister of Foreign Affairs

== Education ==
Stoytchev was a student at Sofia University and earned bachelor's and master's degree in Philosophy and History.

== Diplomatic career ==
Stoytchev started his diplomatic career in his country's Foreign policy. Since 1994, he has worked in the Directorate for European Integration in the areas of Common Foreign and Security Policy and Justice and Home Affairs Council. He has spent much of his professional career helping his country integrate into Europe after its time in the former Soviet bloc. In 1996, he was third secretary in the Bulgarian Mission to the European Union as the country prepared to join the European Union. In 2000, he returned to the Directorate for European integration as Secretary of the Subcommittee on the EU Internal Market. In 2003, Stoytchev was sent to Washington, D.C. as a political and economic advisor. In 2007, he returned to Bulgaria, where he served as head of the Foreign relations of the European Union, Budget and Financial Instruments, International political economy and Financial Organization Department. The following year, he returned to the Washington Embassy as Deputy Chief of Mission. From 2009 to 2010, he served as Chargé d'affaires and remained until 2011. From 2012, Stoytchev served as foreign policy secretary to President of Bulgaria Rosen Plevneliev. On June 27, 2016, he presented his credentials as Ambassador of Bulgaria to the United States. He was awarded the Commander's Cross of the Order of Merit of the Republic of Poland (2015) and the Commemorative Medal on the occasion of 100 years of diplomatic Bulgaria–United States relations (2003).

== Personal life ==
Tihomir Stoytchev is married.
