= List of ambassadors of Bulgaria to the United States =

Coordinates: 38.912222°N 77.048333°W

Ambassador of Bulgaria to the United States Embassy of Bulgaria in Washington, D.C.
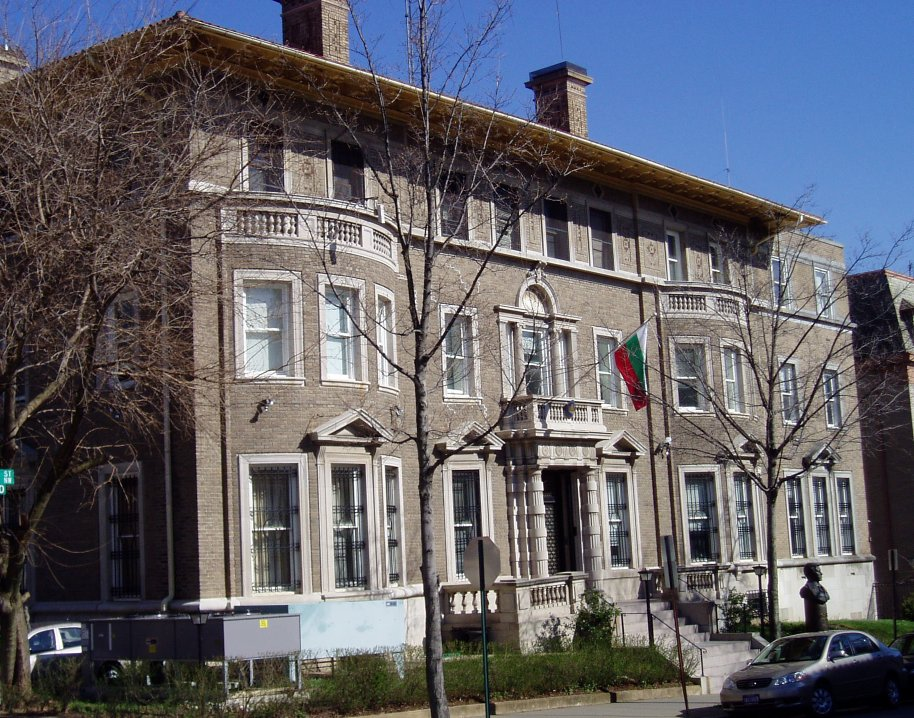
- Incumbent; Tihomir Stoytchev since August 10, 2010
- Inaugural holder: Stefan Panaretov
- Formation: December 22, 1914

The Bulgarian Ambassador to the United States is the official representative of the Government of Bulgaria to the Government of the United States in Washington, D.C. Diplomatic relations between the two countries were established in 1903.

== List of representatives ==
Diplomatic Agreement	Diplomatic Accreditation	Ambassador	Observations	Prime Minister of Bulgaria	List of presidents of the United States	Term end
December 22, 1914			Legation opened	Vasil Radoslavov	Woodrow Wilson	
December 22, 1914		Stefan Panaretov		Vasil Radoslavov	Woodrow Wilson	
December 16, 1920		Paul Lessinoff	Chargé d'affaires	Aleksandar Stamboliyski	Woodrow Wilson	
August 24, 1921		Stefan Panaretov		Aleksandar Stamboliyski	Warren G. Harding	
August 5, 1922		Paul Lessinoff	Chargé d'affaires	Aleksandar Stamboliyski	Warren G. Harding	
June 1, 1925		Stephen P. Bisseroff	Chargé d'affaires	Aleksandar Stamboliyski	Calvin Coolidge	
December 17, 1925		Simeon Radev		Aleksandar Stamboliyski	Calvin Coolidge	
October 20, 1933		Stoyan Petroff Tchomakoff	Chargé d'affaires	Nikola Mushanov	Franklin D. Roosevelt	
May 1, 1936		Dimitri Naoumoff		Andrey Toshev	Franklin D. Roosevelt	
December 13, 1941			Announcement of State of War	Georgi Kyoseivanov	Franklin D. Roosevelt	
November 21, 1947			Legation re-opened as People's Republic of Bulgaria	Georgi Dimitrov	Harry S. Truman	
November 21, 1947		Boyan Athanassov	Chargé d'affaires	Georgi Dimitrov	Harry S. Truman	
December 16, 1947	December 29, 1947	Nissim Judasy Mevorah		Georgi Dimitrov	Harry S. Truman	
December 24, 1948		Peter Voutov	Chargé d'affaires. On December 12, 1949, Voutov was informed that the United States took a serious view of the persecution of Bulgarian employees of the Legation.	Georgi Dimitrov	Harry S. Truman	
February 20, 1950			Severed relations	Valko Chervenkov	Harry S. Truman	
December 2, 1959	January 15, 1960	Peter G. Voutov		Anton Yugov	Dwight D. Eisenhower	
May 13, 1963	June 1, 1963	Lubomir Dimitrov Popov		Todor Zhivkov	Lyndon B. Johnson	
August 30, 1965	September 1, 1965	Luben Guerassimov		Todor Zhivkov	Lyndon B. Johnson	
November 28, 1966			Legation raised to embassy	Todor Zhivkov	Lyndon B. Johnson	
December 12, 1966	December 14, 1966	Luben Guerassimov		Todor Zhivkov	Lyndon B. Johnson	
October 17, 1972	December 19, 1972	Khristo Delchev Zdravchev		Stanko Todorov	Richard Nixon	
October 14, 1973		Vladimir Velchev	Chargé d'affaires	Stanko Todorov	Richard Nixon	
May 10, 1974	June 5, 1974	Lubomir Dimitrov Popov		Stanko Todorov	Gerald Ford	
September 14, 1977		Krassin Himmirsky	Chargé d'affaires	Stanko Todorov	Jimmy Carter	
February 8, 1978	February 15, 1978	Konstantin Nicolov Grigorov		Stanko Todorov	Jimmy Carter	
September 17, 1980	November 24, 1980	Stoyan Iliev Zhulev	Head of Chemical Fibers and served on Committee of Light Industry (1965-1968)	Stanko Todorov	Jimmy Carter	
September 23, 1988	November 9, 1988	Velichko Filipov Velichkov		Georgi Atanasov	Ronald Reagan	
December 18, 1990	February 19, 1991	Ognian Pishev		Andrey Lukanov	George H. W. Bush	
April 1994	August 11, 1994	Snezhana Botusharova	J.D./Ph.D., Deputy Chairperson and Acting Chairperson of the National Parliament	Reneta Indzhova	Bill Clinton	
September 4, 1998	September 10, 1998	Philip Dimitrov		Ivan Kostov	Bill Clinton	
February 13, 2002	February 14, 2002	Elena Poptodorova		Simeon Sakskoburggotski	George W. Bush	
November 5, 2008	December 3, 2008	Latchezar Petkov		Sergei Stanishev	George W. Bush	
August 4, 2010	August 10, 2010	Elena Poptodorova		Boyko Borisov	Barack Obama	
	June 27, 2016	Tihomir Stoytchev		Ognyan Gerdzhikov	Barack Obama	
