= Georgi Panayotov =

Bulgarian diplomat

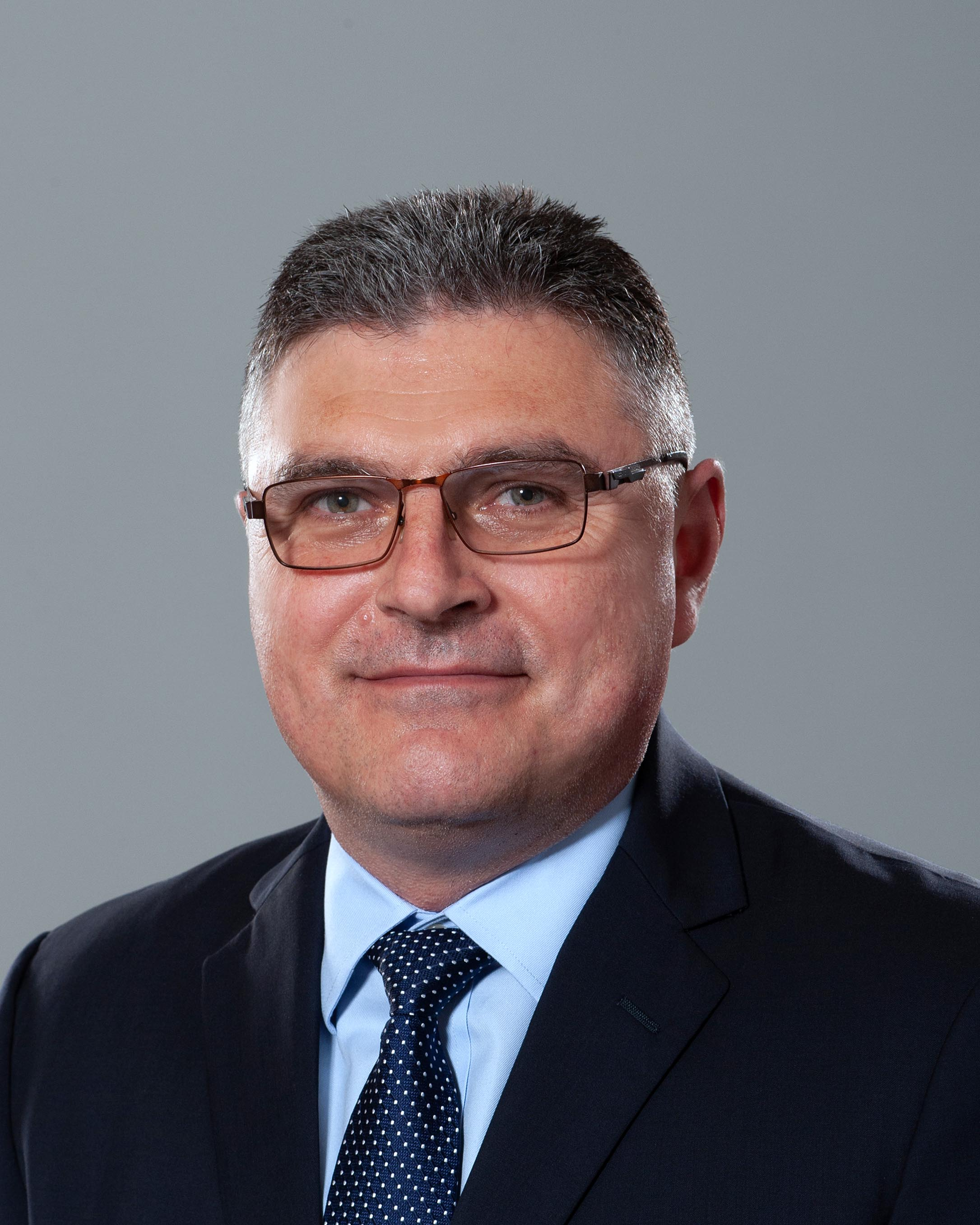

Bulgaria Ambassador to the United States
- Incumbent
- Assumed office 22 March 2022
- President: Rumen Radev
- Prime Minister: Kiril Petkov
- Preceded by: Tihomir Stoytchev

Minister of Defence
- In office 12 May 2021 – 13 December 2021
- Prime Minister: Stefan Yanev
- Preceded by: Krasimir Karakachanov
- Succeeded by: Stefan Yanev

Personal details
- Born: 1968 (age 57–58) Bulgaria

Georgi Velikov Panayotov (Bulgarian: Георги Великов Панайотов; born 1968) is a Bulgarian politician who was a minister in the Yanev II government, serving as Minister of Defence of Bulgaria. He is currently the Ambassador of Bulgaria to the United States since May 2022. He has held numerous posts in the Ministry of Foreign Affairs of Bulgaria and in the Ministry of Foreign Affairs department for the North Atlantic Treaty Organization. He was the Permanent Representative of the Republic of Bulgaria to the United Nations.

== Biography ==
Born in the Bulgarian People's Republic, Panayotov graduated from the Moscow State Institute of International Relations with a master's degree in politics. From 1995 until 2000, he was the political officer of the Bulgarian embassy in Tirana, Albania, and then the deputy head of multilateral cooperation in the southeastern European department of the foreign ministry. From 2002, Panayotov was the deputy chief of mission at the Bulgarian embassy in Kabul, Afghanistan, until 2007, and in 2010 he was appointed as political officer and deputy chief of mission at the Bulgarian embassy in Washington, DC. From 2014 until 2016 Panayotov worked as the head of NATO's foreign affairs department. Since September 2016 he has been the permanent representative of Bulgaria to the United Nations. He was assigned by the President of Bulgaria as the acting defence minister of Bulgaria until 2021. He was appointed ambassador of Bulgaria to the United States since 2022.

Along with his native Bulgarian, is fluent in English, Russian, German, and Albanian.

Political offices
Preceded by Krasimir Karakachanov	Minister of Defence of Bulgaria; 12 May 2021 – 13 December 2021	Succeeded by Stefan Yanev
Diplomatic posts
Preceded by Stefan Tafrov	Permanent Representative of Bulgaria to the United Nations; 2016–2021	Succeeded by Lachezara Stoeva
