= Bust of Vasil Levski =

Sculpture in Washington, D.C., U.S.

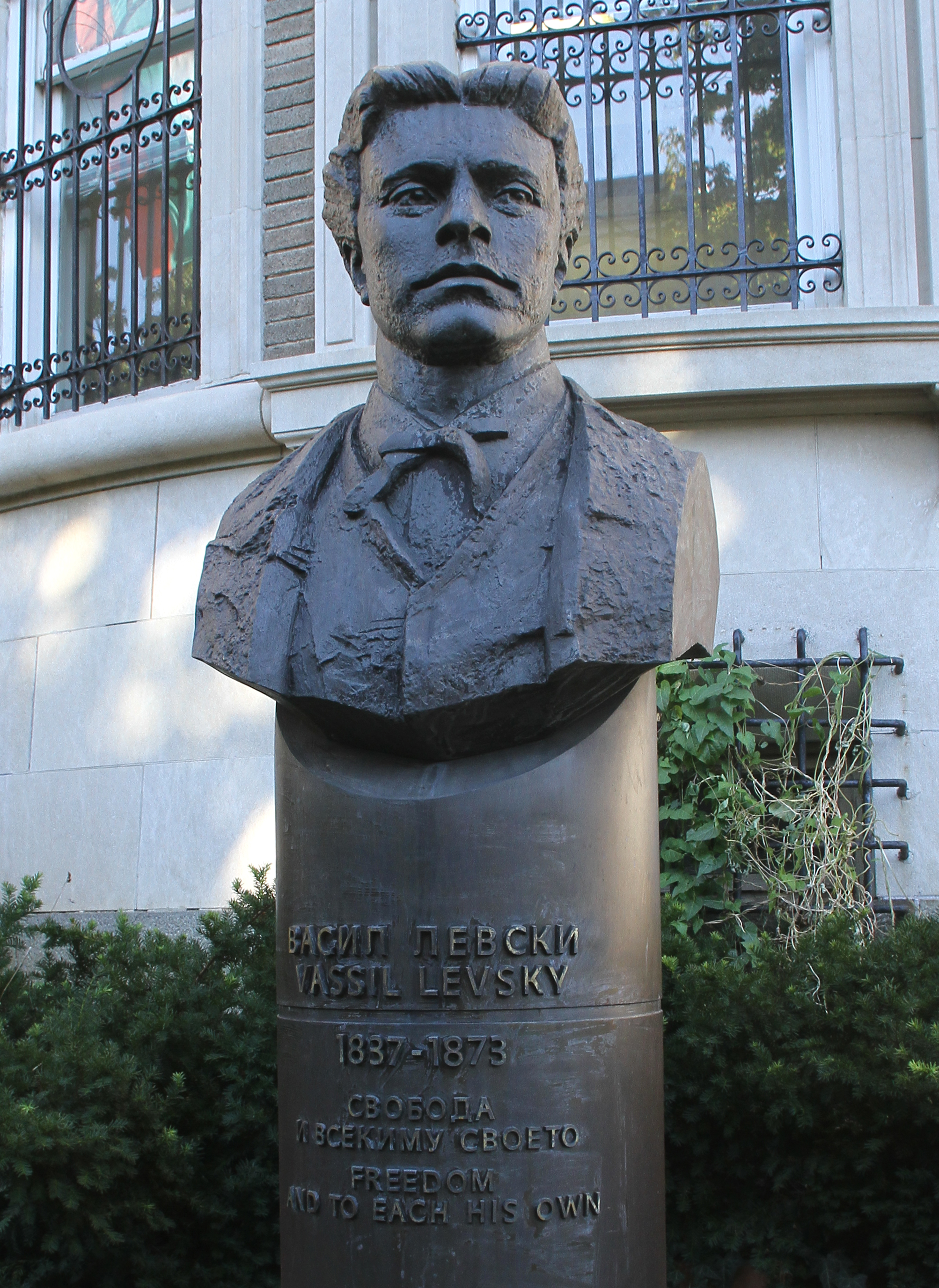
- The bust in front of the Embassy of Bulgaria in Washington, D.C.
- Type: Sculpture
- Subject: Vasil Levski
- Location: Washington, D.C., United States; 38.912275°N 77.048663°W

A bust of Vasil Levski is installed outside the Embassy of Bulgaria (1621 22nd Street NW), near Sheridan Circle, along Embassy Row and in the Kalorama Heights neighborhood of Washington, D.C., United States.

== Description ==
The artwork has an inscription with both Bulgarian and English text "Svoboda i sekimu svoeto" and "Freedom and to each his own", respectively.

== History ==
In 1995, the President of Bulgaria Zhelyu Zhelev advocated for erecting a monument to Vasil Levski in the United States. The Vasil Levski Foundation, founded in Sofia in 1991, undertook this initiative. The foundation proposed the U.S. monument to be an author's copy of the monument to the Apostle in the park Borisova gradina in Sofia, built a year earlier. The bust's author is the Bulgarian sculptor Vladimir Ginovski, and the architect of the composition is Ivan Bitrakov. Ginovski is the best known in Bulgaria with the monument to the Saints Cyril and Methodius, unveiled in 1975 in front of the National Library in Sofia (with author's copies built in Rome, Italy and Murmansk, Russia).

Ginovski completed the monument in 1996 and attended its unveiling in Washington, D.C., on July 18 of the same year when it was the 159th anniversary of Levski's birth. On his only trip to the States, Ginowski was able to visit art galleries in New York.

In 2007, the monument was included in the album of monuments and sculptural portraits of Levski - "Memory of the Apostle". The collection includes nearly 130 illustrations. Additional information about the author, the year of construction and unveiling of the monument, etc. are provided for every artwork. Among the 14 most valuable photographs of sculptures of the Apostle is the photograph of the monument in Washington, D.C.

In July 2016, Bulgarian Deputy Prime Minister and Minister of Interior Affairs Rumyana Bachvarova visited the U.S. and with Ambassador Tihomir Stoychev laid flowers at the monument in honor of the 179th anniversary of the birth of Levski. In October 2020, the U.S. Ambassador to Bulgaria Herro Mustafa paid tribute to the monument to the Apostle in Washington, D.C.

Every year around February 19, the day of Levski's hanging by Ottomans, many Bulgarians living in the U.S. pass through Washington, D.C., and pay tribute to the memory of the Bulgarian national hero. On July 18, the Levski's birthday, the embassy staff regularly laid flowers in front of the monument and paid tribute to the memory of the Apostle.

== Additional facts ==
- Angela Cannon and Harry Leich of the Library of Congress included the bust on their list of Slavic and Central European Sights of Interest within the Washington, D.C., area.
- In addition to the monument in Washington, there is another copy of the same monument in Hungary.
- In 2010, a monument to the American pilots died during World War II bombings of Sofia and other Bulgarian towns was reciprocally erected in the garden in front of the US Embassy in Sofia.

== See also ==
- List of public art in Washington, D.C., Ward 2
