= Rayko Strahilov Raytchev =

Bulgarian diplomat (born 1955)

H.E. Rayko Strahilov Raytchev

Permanent Representative to the United Nations for Bulgaria
- In office September 2007 – June 2012
- Preceded by: Ivan T. Piperkov
- Succeeded by: Stefan Tafrov

Personal details
- Born: 29 March 1955 (age 71)

Rayko Strahilov Raytchev (Bulgarian: Райко Страхилов Райчев; born 29 March 1955) was the Permanent Representative to the United Nations for Bulgaria from September 2007 to June 2012. He is married and has one daughter.

== Education ==
Raytchev holds a master's degree in international relations from the Higher Institute of Economics in Sofia, Bulgaria. Also, training in specialization and project formulation and execution at the United Nations Population Fund (UNFPA) Secretariat; a certificate in peacekeeping negotiations and mediation from the Pearson Peacekeeping Centre in Canada; and certification in managing political and economic change from Harvard University’s John F. Kennedy School of Government.

== Career ==
Raytchev was Chief of the Cabinet of the Minister of Foreign Affairs of Bulgaria prior to his taking office at the United Nations. He was the head of the Arms Control and International Security and Global Security and Disarmament departments in the Foreign Ministry’s North Atlantic Treaty Organization (NATO) and International Security Directorate. Other postings include Deputy Permanent Representative to the United Nations in New York City, United Nations Department within the Coordination and Planning Directorate, and United Nations and General Issues Department.

== See also ==
- List of current permanent representatives to the United Nations
