= Stefan Tafrov =

Bulgarian politician

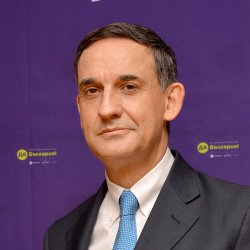

Permanent Representative to the United Nations for Bulgaria
- In office June 2012 – 2016
- Preceded by: Rayko Strahilov Raytchev
- Succeeded by: Georgi Velikov Panayotov
- In office April 2001 – 2006
- Preceded by: Petko Draganov
- Succeeded by: Ivan T. Piperkov

Personal details
- Born: 11 February 1958 (age 68) Sofia, Bulgaria
- Education: Sofia University

Stefan Tafrov is a Bulgarian politician, born on 11 February 1958, in Sofia. He was the Permanent Representative of Bulgaria to the United Nations between 2001 and 2006, being replaced by Ivan T. Piperkov. In September 2002 and December 2003, as part of the standard presidency rotation, he took up the presidency of the United Nations Security Council. In June 2012, he was once again appointed as the Permanent Representative of Bulgaria to the United Nations, and served until 2016.

He graduated from the Lycée Français de Sofia, in 1977. After receiving a Master's degree in journalism from Sofia University in 1983, Mr. Tafrov worked until 1987 as a staff writer for the weekly newspaper ABV, in Sofia.

Prior to his UN appointment, Mr. Tafrov was his country's Ambassador to France. He also served as the permanent delegate of Bulgaria to the United Nations Educational, Scientific and Cultural Organization (UNESCO).

From 1991 to 1997, he held a number of diplomatic posts, serving two separate terms as the First Deputy Minister of Foreign Affairs of his country, and also as Ambassador to Italy and the United Kingdom.

From 1989 to 1991, he worked as head of the foreign desk of the daily newspaper Democratzia, in Sofia, Bulgaria. During that same period, he also headed the International Relations Department of the Union of Democratic Forces, and was the foreign affairs adviser to the President of the Republic of Bulgaria.

Tafrov has been decorated as Commandeur de la Légion d'Honneur of France, and is a member of the International Institute for Strategic Studies of London, United Kingdom.
