= Elena Poptodorova =

Bulgarian politician and diplomat

- Елена Поптодорова
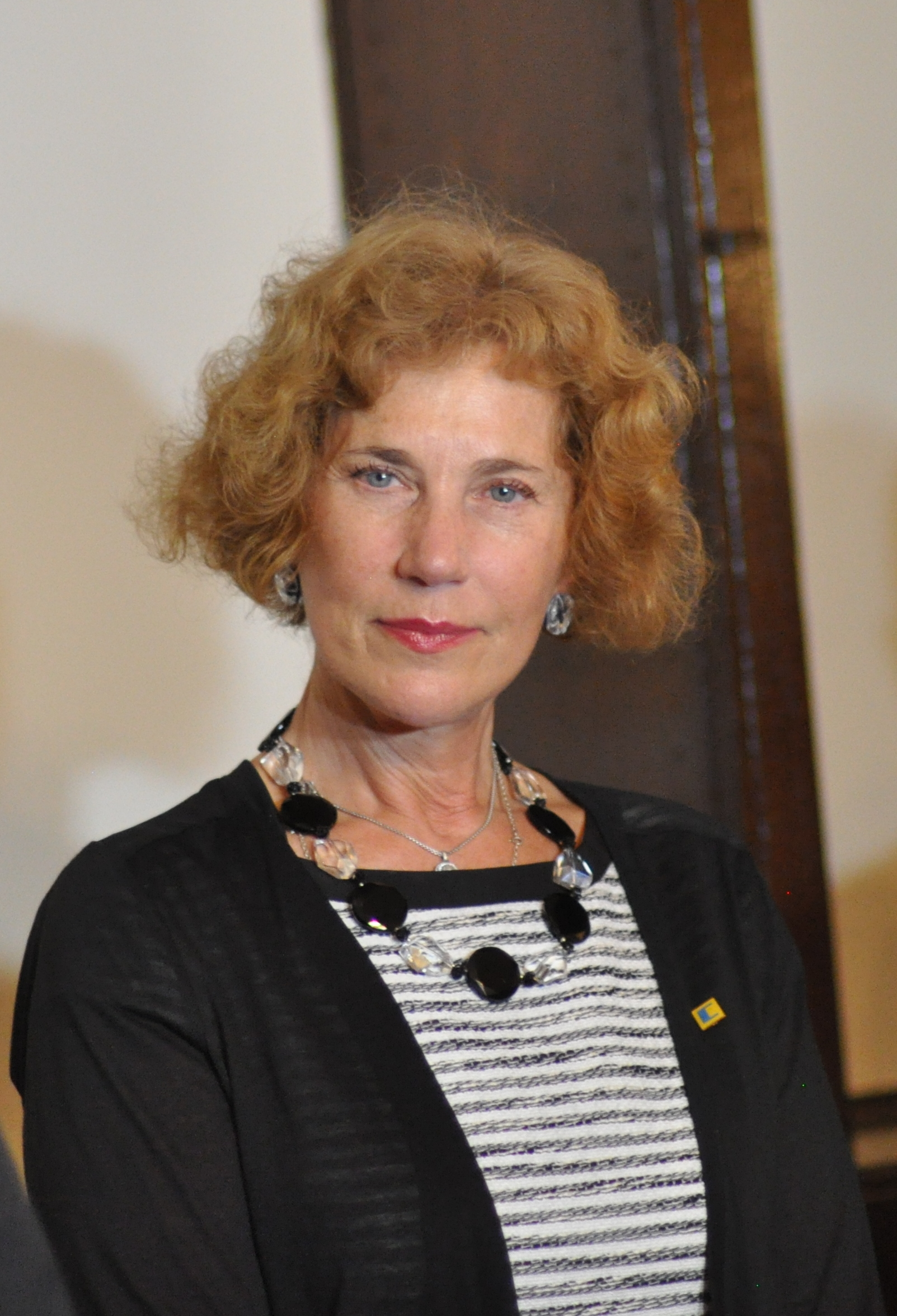
- Poptodorova in 2014

Bulgarian Ambassador to the U.S.
- In office 10 August 2010 – 16 May 2016
- President: Georgi Parvanov; Rossen Plevneliev
- Preceded by: Lachezar Petkov
- Succeeded by: Tihomir Stoytchev
- In office 14 February 2002 – 5 November 2008
- President: Georgi Parvanov
- Preceded by: Philip Dimitrov
- Succeeded by: Lachezar Petkov

Member of the National Assembly
- In office 4 November 1991 – 19 April 2001

Personal details
- Born: Elena Borislavova Poptodorova; August 31, 1951 (age 75) Sofia, PR Bulgaria
- Party: Independent (since 2001)
- Other political affiliations: BEL (1997-2001); BSP (1990-1997)
- Spouse: Georgi Petrov
- Education: Sofia University (BA), UNWE (MA)
- Occupation: Diplomat; politician

Elena Poptodorova (Bulgarian: Елена Поптодорова, born August 31, 1951) is a Bulgarian diplomat who served as Bulgarian Ambassador to the United States from 2002 to 2008 and from 2010 to 2016. A former politician, she previously served as Member of the National Assembly from 1991 to 2001.

== Early life ==
Elena Poptodorova was born on August 31, 1951, in Sofia, Bulgaria. She holds a degree in English and Italian linguistic and literary studies from Sofia University (1974).

== Foreign Ministry service ==
Elena Poptodorova joined the Ministry of Foreign Affairs in 1975 as a high-level interpreter for the Bulgarian Government. She later entered into a career of diplomacy. She served from 3rd secretary through minister-counselor in the Secretariat, the State Protocol, the Cabinet of the Minister and the UN and Disarmament Directorates through 1990, when she was elected to the national legislature.

From 1987 to 1990 she was minister-counselor at the Bulgarian embassy in Rome and Bulgaria's Consul General to the Republic of San Marino.

Prior to her appointment in Washington, Poptodorova was Director of the Security Policy Directorate at the Ministry of Foreign Affairs, a position, which she held for a year starting on August 1, 2009. From – 2009 she served as Ambassador-at-Large for the Black Sea Region at the Ministry of Foreign Affairs. Before her first mandate as the Ambassador of Bulgaria to the US, she served as a spokesperson of the Ministry of Foreign Affairs and Director of the Human Rights and International Humanitarian Organizations Directorate.

From 2002 to 2008 she was Bulgaria's Ambassador Extraordinary and Plenipotentiary to the United States of America, when Bulgaria became a member of NATO and the EU. She started the Bulgaria Caucus on the Hill, the Honorary Consuls corps and the network of Bulgarian schools in the US, among many others. She was sent a second time to the same post in 2010, and remained in the office until May 16, 2016.

Poptodorova is fluent in English, Italian, French, Russian, and her native Bulgarian.

== Post-diplomatic career ==
She is vice-president of the Atlantic Treaty Association and director for Euro-Atlantic affairs at the Atlantic Club of Bulgaria.

== Member of the National Parliament ==
Poptodorova had a long career as a politician right from the beginning of the changes in Bulgaria in 1989. She was first elected a member of the National Assembly of Bulgaria in the 7th Constituent Assembly from the list of the Bulgarian Socialist Party in 1990, and was a speaker of the Parliamentary group of BSP. She was re-elected in the 36th, 37th and 38th National Parliaments. She served on the committees on foreign policy, national security, radio and TV, human rights, agriculture. She was the Deputy Chair of the Bulgarian delegation to the International Parliamentary Union, member of the national delegations to the Parliamentary Assembly of the Council of Europe (PACE), and the Joint Parliamentary Committee ‘Bulgaria-EU’. She also served as Deputy Chair of the Inter-European Parliamentary Forum on Population and Development (IEPFPD).

In the late 1990s, Poptodorova was among the influential members of the Bulgarian Euro-Left.

== Education ==
Elena Poptodorova earned her B.A. and M.A. degrees at the St. Kliment Ohridski University of Sofia in English and Italian linguistic and literary studies, after which she attended a post-graduate course in international relations at the University of National and World Economy in Sofia. She specialized at the University of Leeds, UK and the University of Siena, Italy.

== Affiliations ==
Ambassador Poptodorova is a founding member and member of the Boards of Bulgarian nongovernmental organizations among which:

- The Atlantic Club of Bulgaria
- The Center for Regional and Geopolitical Research
- The Bulgarian Family Planning and Reproductive Health Association which she currently chairs.

Since 1995 Elena Poptodorova is a trustee of the board of directors of the American University in Bulgaria.

She is also a member of the Washington-based Executive Council on Diplomacy and Women's Foreign Policy Group.

Ambassador Poptodorova is Doctor Honoris Causa of the Assumption College, Worcester, US.

== Awards and honors ==
- 2011 - Distinguished Service Award by the American University in Bulgaria
- 2008 - The Annual Award of the General Federation of Women's Clubs of the United States of America for leadership and outstanding contribution to the empowerment of women;
- 2008 - Medal of Honor "For Valour and Merit", I class, of Bulgaria's Ministry of Interior, for outstanding contribution to establishing the rule of law in Bulgaria, and the enhancement of the national interest and of national and European security;
- 2008 - Recognition Award of the Director of the US Secret Service in appreciation of her many contributions in support of the Secret Service mission and selfless commitment to the ideals and principles of law enforcement.
- 2007 - The Gold Medal of the Ministry of Foreign Affairs for outstanding contribution to Bulgaria's accession to the EU;
- 2003 - The Gold Medal of Bulgaria's Atlantic Club for promoting Bulgaria's membership in NATO;
- 2003 - Silver Medal on the occasion of 100 Years of Bulgarian-US Diplomatic Relations;
- 2002 - Honorary Member of the Parliamentary Assembly of the Council of Europe in recognition of services rendered to the European cause.

== Personal life ==
In September 2016, she is appointed as head of the Central European office of AJC - a position she stepped down from on 1 March 2017 for "personal reasons".

On 28 February 2017, Poptodorova was briefly detained at the airport in Warsaw, allegedly for theft of cosmetics – a story that was spread by 90 Russian news outlets, some of which were then quoted in Bulgarian media. A court case was started in 2017, and was conditionally closed in October 2018, when a Polish court decided not to punish her and not to include her name in the criminal record.

Elena Poptodorova is married and has one son.
