= Stefan Panaretov =

Bulgarian diplomat, academician and professor

Stephen Panaretoff
- Стефан Панаретов Хаджиилиев
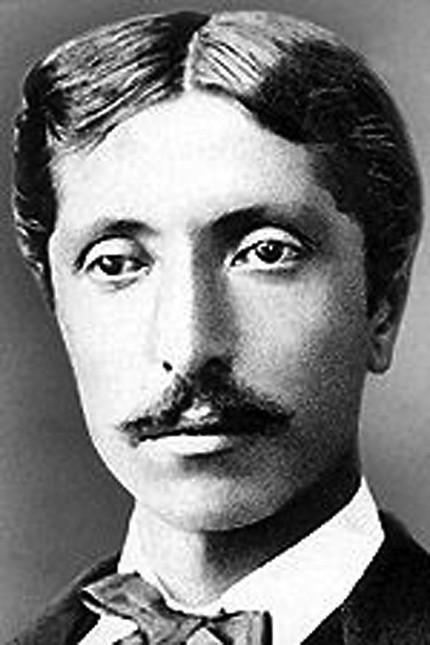
- Born: 4 October 1853; Sliven, Ottoman Empire
- Died: 19 October 1931 (aged 78); Washington, DC, U.S.
- Resting place: Rock Creek Cemetery; Washington, D.C., U.S. 38°56′59.7″N 77°00′42.1″W
- Citizenship: Ottoman; Bulgarian; U.S.
- Education: Robert College
- Occupations: educator; diplomat
- Employer: Robert College
- Known for: the first Bulgarian Minister to the US
- Spouse: Lydia Ann Gile Panaretoff (m. 1892; died 1931)
- Children: Cyril Panaretoff

Stefan Panaretov (Bulgarian: Стефан Панаретов) or Stephen Panaretoff or Stephan Panaretoff (17 October [O.S. 5 October] 1853 - October 19, 1931) was a prominent Bulgarian diplomat, academician and professor at Robert College, an independent private high school in Turkey.

== Early life ==
He was born on 4 October 1853 in Sliven to Archimandrite Panaret, a Bulgarian clergyman, who served in the Bulgarian church in Constantinople. At the age of 14 he entered the recently established Robert College and graduated in 1871. Upon graduation he immediately became an assistant professor in Bulgarian literature and in 1875 was promoted to the rank of a professor. Panaretoff taught for 43 years at Robert College until he was appointed, at the age of 61, as the first Bulgarian minister to the U.S.

After the April Uprising and following Ottoman Atrocities in 1876, Panaretoff publicized the Turkish massacres of Bulgarian Christians in an effort to sway Western public opinion. He traveled to Britain to represent the Bulgarian people. In 1880, Panaretoff conducted another unofficial diplomatic mission to London to gain support for Bulgarian acquisition of Eastern Rumelia.

In 1892 he married the American missionary and teacher Lydia Ann Gile (1869–1931), who taught at the American College for Girls in Constantinople.

== Diplomat and lecturer ==
He became the first Special Envoy and Minister Plenipotentiary of Bulgaria to the U.S. after presenting his Letter of Credence to President Woodrow Wilson on December 22, 1914.

His only son, Cyril Panaretoff, was killed in the First World War, fighting for the Kingdom of Bulgaria.

He played a critical role in maintaining Bulgarian relations with the Wilson administration through the War, despite a myriad of calls for the breaking of diplomatic ties with the Central Power ally. In 1918, Panaretov was the only official diplomatic representative of a member country of the Central Powers who continued his work in the capital of the United States.

In 1921, Panaretoff served as the ad hoc Bulgarian representative to the League of Nations after the international organization admitted Bulgaria as a member state.

Panaretov resigned his post as Minister Plenipotentiary in 1925. Rather than return to Bulgaria, Panaretov and his wife stayed in Washington and he became lecturer at George Washington University.

== Legacy ==
After his death, which followed the death of his wife, the Bulgarian Academy of Sciences received a bequest from his estate of approximately 2.5 million lev. The academy built a library and reading room that was named in his honor.

== Books ==
- Panaretoff, Stephen (1922). Near Eastern Affairs and Conditions (1 ed.). New York: Macmillan – via Internet Archive.
- Bulgaria and Her Neighbors : An Historic Presentation of the Background of the Balkan Problem, One of the Basic Issues of the World-War (1 ed.). New York: Mail and Express Job Print. 1917 – via HathiTrust Digital Library. and via Internet Archive
