= 40th National Assembly of Bulgaria =

2005 legislature in Bulgaria

40th National Assembly 40-то Народно събрание

History
- Founded: July 11, 2005
- Disbanded: June 25, 2009
- Preceded by: 39th National Assembly
- Succeeded by: 41st National Assembly

Leadership
- Speaker: Georgi Pirinski (BSP)
- Deputy Speakers: Nadezhda Mihaylova; Ekaterina Mihaylova; Petar Beron; Anastasia Moser; Younal Loutfi; Kameliya Kasabova

Structure
- Seats: 240
- Political groups: Government (169) BSP (82) NDSV (53) DPS (34) Opposition (71) Attack (21) ODS (20) DSB (17) BNS (13)

Meeting place
- National Assembly Building, Sofia

Website
- parliament.bg

The Fortieth National Assembly (Bulgarian: Четиридесетото народно събрание) was a convocation of the National Assembly of Bulgaria, formed according to the results of the parliamentary elections in Bulgaria, held on 25 June 2005.

== History ==
The 40th National Assembly elected the Stanishev Government, which was a triple coalition government between the BSP, the NDSV and the DPS. During the four years of its term, the 40th National Assembly saw Bulgaria become a member of the European Union.

The 40th National Assembly, like the preceding 39th was highly fragmented and saw the collapse and emergence of several new parties and groups. As a result, since 2009 MPs have been forbidden from forming new groups or joining existing ones. MPs are only allowed to sit in either their original groups or as independents.

=== Attack ===
The Attack parliamentary group was particularly unstable with many expulsions and defections. By November 2007, only 11 of the 21 MPs remained in the group, one more than the minimum number required. In the runup to the 2009 election 2 further MPs left due to disagreements with the electoral lists, resulting in the collapse of the group.

=== BNS ===
The BNS coalition remained stable for most of the Assembly's term, however in 2008 VMRO and ZNS formed an electoral alliance with the extra-parliamentary Lider party and rebranded the caucus as "Movement Forward", resulting in the defection of 5 (SSD and ZNS) MPs, leaving the group under 10 members. They were supplemented by the 2 DG MPs who left ODS to join the new group. However, as Lider left the alliance in April 2009 the group's parties and MPs mostly joined the electoral alliance and parliamentary group of RZS on the last day of the Assembly.

=== ODS ===
ODS suffered internal tensions after a number of underperformances (in particular the 2006 Presidential, 2007 EU and 2007 local elections). In 2005 ODS expelled the DP and its 3 MPs. In 2009 following the announcement of the formation of the Blue Coalition, a number of MPs left the group to join RZS, leaving ODS with only the minimum required 10 members.

=== NDSV ===
In early 2008 17 MPs left NDSV and founded the BND party and parliamentary group

== Members ==
A list of MPs and their parliamentary groups is presented below:

Attack	KzB	NDSV	BND	BNS	Movement "Forward"	DPS	ODS	DSB	RZS	Independent	Vacant

MMC	Coalition	Name
Blagoevgrad	KzB	Georgi Yurukov
Blagoevgrad	KzB	Lyuben Kornezov
Blagoevgrad	NDSV	Snezhana Grozdilova
Blagoevgrad	NDSV	(Note: Boyko Borisov) Marina Dikova
Blagoevgrad	ODS	Yasen Popvasilev
Blagoevgrad	ODS	Yane Yanev
Blagoevgrad	DPS	Aliosman Imamov
Blagoevgrad	DPS	(Note: Nahit Ziya) Musa Palev
Blagoevgrad	DSB	Eliana Maseva
Blagoevgrad	BNS	Boris Yachev
Burgas	KzB	(Note: Georgi Kadiev) Penko Atanasov
Burgas	KzB	(Note: Lyubomir Panteleev) Stoyko Tankov
Burgas	KzB	(Note: Sergey Stanishev) Marusya Lyubcheva Dobromir Zadgorski
Burgas	DPS	(Note: Dzhevdet Chakarov) Yusein Dzhemil
Burgas	DPS	Nesrin Uzun
Burgas	DPS	Fatme Iliyaz
Burgas	NDSV	Angel Tyurkedzhiev
Burgas	NDSV	Solomon Passy
Burgas	Attack	Vanyu Harkov
Burgas	Attack	Todor Batilov
Burgas	DSB	Svetoslav Malinov
Burgas	ODS	Lyuben Dilov Jr.
Burgas	BNS	Rumen Angelov
Varna	NDSV	Aneliya Atanasova
Varna	NDSV	Yani Yanev
Varna	NDSV	(Note: Nikolay Vasilev) Denitsa Dimitrova
Varna	NDSV	Borislav Ralchev
Varna	KzB	Apostol Dimitrov Ivo Seferov
Varna	KzB	Petar Dimitrov Stanka Marincheva
Varna	KzB	Andrey Pantev
Varna	Attack	Borislav Noev
Varna	Attack	Petar Manolov
Varna	ODS	Dimitar Dimitrov
Varna	ODS	Hristo Kirchev
Varna	DPS	Yordan Tsonev
Varna	DSB	Dimitar Kamburov
Varna	BNS	Stefan Sofiyanski
V. Tarnovo	KzB	Boyko Velikov
V. Tarnovo	KzB	Stoyan Vitanov
V. Tarnovo	KzB	(Note: Vesela Lecheva) Nadka Yankova
V. Tarnovo	NDSV	Mariana Kostadinova (Note: Hristo Georgiev)
V. Tarnovo	NDSV	Nikolay Svinarov
V. Tarnovo	Attack	Hristo Velichkov
V. Tarnovo	DSB	Dimitar Abadzhiev
V. Tarnovo	ODS	Dimitar Yordanov
V. Tarnovo	BNS	Miroslav Murdzhov
Vidin	KzB	(Note: Radoslav Gaydarski) Boris Nikolov Radoslav Gaydarski
Vidin	KzB	Mihail Mikov Boris Nikolov
Vidin	KzB	Nadya Kocheva (Note: Miroslava Mitova-Miroslavova)
Vidin	NDSV	Nina Chilova
Vratsa	KzB	Georgi Bozhinov
Vratsa	KzB	Dimitar Gundev
Vratsa	KzB	Ivan Grizanov
Vratsa	KzB	Ivan Dakov
Vratsa	KzB	Toma Tomov
Vratsa	NDSV	Hristina Velcheva
Vratsa	NDSV	Yordan Kostadinov
Gabrovo	KzB	Yovko Yovkov Nikolay Grigorov
Gabrovo	KzB	Tatyana Doncheva
Gabrovo	NDSV	Stanimir Ilchev
Gabrovo	NDSV	Todor Kosturski Sabi Sabev
Dobrich	KzB	Nikolay Kamov
Dobrich	KzB	Evtim Kostadinov Siyana Fudulova
Dobrich	KzB	Yasen Penchev Nikola Prodanov
Dobrich	NDSV	(Note: Daniel Valchev) Mima Vasileva
Dobrich	NDSV	Encho Malev
Dobrich	DPS	(Note: Nihat Kabil) Erdinch Hadzhiev Nihat Kabil
Dobrich	Attack	Stancho Todorov
Kardzhali	DPS	Ahmed Dogan
Kardzhali	DPS	Lyutvi Mestan
Kardzhali	DPS	Nedzhmi Ali
Kardzhali	DPS	Remzi Osman
Kardzhali	DPS	Yunal Tasim
Kyustendil	KzB	Ivo Atanasov
Kyustendil	KzB	Margarita Paneva
Kyustendil	KzB	Maya Manolova
Kyustendil	NDSV	Borislav Vladimirov
Kyustendil	NDSV	Vanya Tsvetkova
Lovech	KzB	Donka Mihaylova
Lovech	KzB	Yanaki Stoilov
Lovech	KzB	Vladimir Damgov Yordan Yordanov
Lovech	NDSV	Darinka Stancheva
Lovech	NDSV	Lidiya Shuleva
Montana	KzB	Aleksandar Radoslavov
Montana	KzB	Emil Georgiev
Montana	KzB	Zhori Aleksiev
Montana	KzB	Vasil Kalinov (Note: Marin Marinov)
Montana	NDSV	Margarita Kaneva
Montana	NDSV	Borislav Velikov
Pazardzhik	KzB	Georgi Pirinski
Pazardzhik	KzB	Iglika Ivanova
Pazardzhik	KzB	Marko Mechev
Pazardzhik	KzB	(Note: Georgi Petarneychev) Kostadin Kobakov
Pazardzhik	NDSV	Valentin Miltenov
Pazardzhik	NDSV	Petya Gegova
Pazardzhik	DPS	Fidel Beev
Pazardzhik	Attack	Stanislav Stanilov
Pazardzhik	ODS	Ivan Kolchakov
Pernik	KzB	Angel Naydenov
Pernik	KzB	Rositsa Yanakieva-Kostadinova Simeon Simeonov
Pernik	KzB	Nenko Temelkov (Note: Ina Naydenova)
Pernik	NDSV	Teodora Yakimova-Drenska
Pernik	NDSV	Tatyana Kalkanova
Pleven	KzB	Vasil Antonov
Pleven	KzB	Doncho Tsonchev
Pleven	KzB	Radoslav Ilievski
Pleven	KzB	(Note: Rumen Petkov) Petar Simeonov Rumen Petkov
Pleven	NDSV	Antoniya Parvanova
Pleven	NDSV	Aneliya Mingova Andrey Batashov
Pleven	DPS	Mithat Metin
Pleven	BNS	Ventsislav Varbanov
Pleven	ODS	Asya Mihaylova
Pleven	Attack	Stela Bankova
Plovdiv	NDSV	Milen Velchev
Plovdiv	NDSV	Vladimir Donchev
Plovdiv	KzB	Zahari Georgiev
Plovdiv	KzB	Atanas Paparizov Atanaska Teneva
Plovdiv	ODS	Petar Stoyanov Petar Popov
Plovdiv	ODS	Mariya Kapon
Plovdiv	DSB	Vasil Panitsa
Plovdiv	DPS	Firket Shabanov
Plovdiv	BNS	Boyko Vatev
Plovdiv	Attack	Pavel Shopov
Plovdiv Obl.	KzB	Aleksandar Paunov
Plovdiv Obl.	KzB	Mariya Valkanova
Plovdiv Obl.	KzB	(Note: Petar Mutafchiev) Plamen Slavov
Plovdiv Obl.	NDSV	(Note: Gergana Grancharova) Rupen Kirkoryan
Plovdiv Obl.	NDSV	Plamen Mollov
Plovdiv Obl.	NDSV	Lachezar Ivanov
Plovdiv Obl.	ODS	Yordan Bakalov
Plovdiv Obl.	ODS	Georgi Ivanov
Plovdiv Obl.	DPS	Ahmed Yusein
Plovdiv Obl.	Attack	Georgi Georgiev
Plovdiv Obl.	BNS	Borislav Kitov
Rasgrad	DPS	Daut Osman
Rasgrad	DPS	Ilker Mustafov
Rasgrad	DPS	Hasan Ademov
Rasgrad	DPS	(Note: Emel Toshkova) Nigyar Dzhafer
Rasgrad	KzB	Venelin Uzunov
Ruse	KzB	(Note: Ivaylo Kalfin) Rudenko Yordanov
Ruse	KzB	Silviya Aleksieva
Ruse	NDSV	Botyo Botev
Ruse	NDSV	(Note: Meglena Kuneva) Ilko Dimitrov
Ruse	Attack	Desislav Chukolov Hristo Popov
Ruse	DPS	Reyhan Ablekim
Ruse	ODS	Eleonora Nikolova
Ruse	BNS	Borislav Balgarinov (Note: Yordan Borisov)
Silistra	DPS	Kamen Kostadinov
Silistra	DPS	Yuksel Hatib
Silistra	DPS	Filiz Hyusmenova Hyusein Hamdi
Silistra	KzB	Dobromir Gushterov
Sliven	KzB	Ivan S. Ivanov
Sliven	KzB	(Note: Asen Gagauzov) Plamen Ranchev
Sliven	KzB	Evgeni Kirilov Diana Hitova (Note: Mariya Stoyanova)
Sliven	NDSV	Kosta Tsonev
Sliven	NDSV	Krastanka Shakliyan
Sliven	DPS	Yanko Yankov
Sliven	Attack	Mitko Dimitrov
Smolyan	KzB	Georgi Bliznashki
Smolyan	KzB	Todor Kumchev
Smolyan	DPS	Arif Agush
Smolyan	NDSV	(Note: Georgi Petkanov) Ivan M. Ivanov Georgi Petkanov Ivan M. Ivanov
Sofia 23	DSB	Atanas Atanasov
Sofia 23	DSB	Evgeni Chachev
Sofia 23	DSB	Ivan Kostov
Sofia 23	DSB	Ivan N. Ivanov
Sofia 23	DSB	Antoanela Poneva
Sofia 23	ODS	Martin Dimitrov
Sofia 23	ODS	Nadezhda Mihaylova
Sofia 23	Attack	Mincho Kuminev
Sofia 23	Attack	Pavel Chernev
Sofia 23	NDSV	Plamen Panayotov
Sofia 23	NDSV	Mariya Angelieva-Koleva
Sofia 23	BNS	Krasimir Karakachanov
Sofia 23	KzB	(Note: Rumen Ovcharov) Boyko Radoev (Note: Alyosha Dakov) Rumen Ovcharov
Sofia 24	DSB	Asen Agov
Sofia 24	DSB	Evdokiya Maneva-Babulkova
Sofia 24	DSB	Ekaterina Mihaylova
Sofia 24	DSB	Konstantin Dimitrov
Sofia 24	ODS	Philip Dimitrov Lachezar Toshev
Sofia 24	ODS	Mario Tagarinski
Sofia 24	NDSV	Dolores Arsenova
Sofia 24	NDSV	Yordan Mitev
Sofia 24	BNS	Nikolay Kanchev
Sofia 24	Attack	Dimitar Stoyanov Denitsa Gadzheva
Sofia 24	KzB	(Note: Stefan Danailov) Iliana Iotova Radoslav Ivanov
Sofia 25	KzB	Valentina Bogdanova
Sofia 25	KzB	Iva Stankova
Sofia 25	KzB	Aleksandar Arabadzhiev Evgeniy Ivanov (Note: Nikolay Malinov)
Sofia 25	NDSV	Kameliya Kasabova
Sofia 25	NDSV	Ognyan Gerdzhikov
Sofia 25	ODS	Aleksandar Pramatarski
Sofia 25	ODS	Ivan Sotirov
Sofia 25	Attack	Volen Siderov
Sofia 25	Attack	Vladimir Kuzov (Note: Nadya Ivanova)
Sofia 25	DSB	Veselin Petrov
Sofia 25	DSB	Neno Dimov
Sofia 25	BNS	Anastasia Dimitrova-Moser
Sofia Obl.	KzB	Evgeniya Zhivkova
Sofia Obl.	KzB	Kiril Dobrev
Sofia Obl.	KzB	Mladen Chervenyakov
Sofia Obl.	KzB	Oleg Popov
Sofia Obl.	KzB	SIlviya Stoycheva
Sofia Obl.	NDSV	Vesela Draganova-Ilieva
Sofia Obl.	NDSV	Olimpi Katev
Sofia Obl.	Attack	Petar Beron
Stara Zagora	KzB	Georgi Anastasov
Stara Zagora	KzB	Zlatko Zlatev
Stara Zagora	KzB	Petar Mratskov
Stara Zagora	KzB	Trifon Mitev
Stara Zagora	KzB	(Note: Emiliya Maslarova) Ivan Gorlomov
Stara Zagora	NDSV	Vasil Ivanov-Luchano
Stara Zagora	NDSV	Atanas Shterev
Stara Zagora	DSB	Nikolay Mihaylov
Stara Zagora	BNS	Evgeniy Zhekov
Stara Zagora	ODS	Vanyo Sharkov
Stara Zagora	Attack	Yordan Velichkov
Targovishte	DPS	Erdoan Ahmedov
Targovishte	DPS	Kasim Dal
Targovishte	DPS	Rosen Vladimirov
Targovishte	KzB	Rumen Takorov
Haskovo	KzB	(Note: Rayna Yovcheva) Ivan Ilchev
Haskovo	KzB	Kostadin Paskalev Minka Ruseva
Haskovo	NDSV	(Note: Veselin Bliznakov) Yasen Yanev Veselin Bliznakov
Haskovo	NDSV	Boyko Bobev
Haskovo	DPS	Ramadan Atalay
Haskovo	DPS	Hristo Biserov
Haskovo	Attack	Georgi Dimitrov
Haskovo	BNS	Ivan Stamatov
Shumen	DPS	Metin Syuleymanov
Shumen	DPS	Chetin Kazak
Shumen	DPS	Yunal Lyufti
Shumen	KzB	Dimitar Dabov
Shumen	Attack	Iliyan Iliev
Shumen	NDSV	Svetoslav Spasov
Yambol	KzB	Atanas Merdzhanov
Yambol	KzB	Petar Kanev
Yambol	KzB	Stoyan Ivanov
Yambol	KzB	Kristian Vigenin Ivan G. Ivanov
Yambol	NDSV	Mincho Spasov
