= 39th National Assembly of Bulgaria =

2001 legislature in Bulgaria

39th National Assembly 39-то Народно събрание

History
- Founded: July 5, 2001
- Disbanded: June 17, 2005
- Preceded by: 38th National Assembly
- Succeeded by: 40th National Assembly

Leadership
- Speaker: Ognyan Gerdzhikov (NDSV)
- Deputy Speakers: Blagovest Sendov; Asen Agov; Lyuben Kornezov; Younal Loutfi; Kameliya Kasabova

Structure
- Seats: 240
- Political groups: Government (141) NDSV (120) DPS (21) Opposition (99) ODS (51) BSP (48)

Meeting place
- National Assembly Building, Sofia

Website
- parliament.bg

The Thirty-Ninth National Assembly (Bulgarian: Тридесет и деветото народно събрание) was a convocation of the National Assembly of Bulgaria, formed according to the results of the parliamentary elections in Bulgaria, held on 17 June 2001.

== History ==
The 39th National Assembly elected the Sakskoburggotski Government, headed by the former Tsar of Bulgaria Simeon Sakskoburggotski and his new centrist NDSV party in a coalition with the DPS, another centrist party. The ODS and the BSP both declared themselves in opposition to the government.
During the four years of its term, the 40th National Assembly saw Bulgaria become a Member of NATO and sign its accession treaty to the European Union.

== Members ==
The 39th national assembly was noted for its unstable nature with several new groups emerging during its tenure.

A list of MPs and their parliamentary groups is presented below:

NDSV	New Time	NIE (Note: Not to be confused with the later party of the same name)	DPS	KzB	ODS	SDS	DSB	NS	Independent	Vacant

MMC	Coalition	Name
Blagoevgrad	NDSV	Adriana Bruncheva
Blagoevgrad	NDSV	Velichko Klingov
Blagoevgrad	NDSV	Marina Dikova
Blagoevgrad	NDSV	Snezhana Grozdilova
Blagoevgrad	NDSV	Stanimir Ilchev
Blagoevgrad	DPS	Aliosman Imamov
Blagoevgrad	ODS	Eliana Maseva
Blagoevgrad	ODS	Rositsa Totkova
Blagoevgrad	KzB	Aleksandar Arabadzhiev
Blagoevgrad	KzB	(Note: Kostadin Paskalev) Georgi Yurukov
Burgas	NDSV	Atanas Vasilev
Burgas	NDSV	Zlatka Bobeva
Burgas	NDSV	Ilcho Duganov
Burgas	NDSV	Aleko Kyurkchiev
Burgas	NDSV	(Note: Solomon Passy) Angel Tyurkedzhiev
Burgas	NDSV	Miroslav Sevlievski (Note: Dimitar Kaloyanov)
Burgas	KzB	(Note: Georgi Parvanov) Stoyko Tankov
Burgas	KzB	Lyobomir Panteleev
Burgas	KzB	Todor Boyadzhiev
Burgas	ODS	Petar Zhotev
Burgas	ODS	Georgi Stanilov
Burgas	DPS	Nesrin Uzun
Burgas	DPS	Osman Oktay
Varna	NDSV	Aleksi Aleksiev
Varna	NDSV	Aneliya Atanasova
Varna	NDSV	Borislav Ralchev
Varna	NDSV	Nasko Rafaylov
Varna	NDSV	Ivan Kozovski
Varna	NDSV	Radoslav Koev
Varna	NDSV	Stefan Minkov
Varna	NDSV	(Note: Nikolay Vasilev) Stiliyan Grozdev
Varna	ODS	Blagoy Dimitrov
Varna	ODS	Nadezhda Mihaylova
Varna	ODS	Nickolay Mladenov
Varna	ODS	Hristo Kirchev
Varna	KzB	Andrey Pantev
Varna	KzB	Petar Dimitrov
V. Tarnovo	NDSV	Mariana Kostadinova
V. Tarnovo	NDSV	Svetlin Belchilov
V. Tarnovo	NDSV	Hristo Georgiev
V. Tarnovo	NDSV	Vladimir Dimitrov
V. Tarnovo	NDSV	Siyka Dimovska
V. Tarnovo	KzB	Boyko Velikov
V. Tarnovo	KzB	Krastyo Petkov
V. Tarnovo	ODS	Dimitar Yordanov
V. Tarnovo	ODS	Dimitar Abadzhiev
Vidin	NDSV	Nina Chilova (Note: Sonya Asenova) (Note: Tsvetan Tsenkov)
Vidin	NDSV	Pavlinka Ivanova
Vidin	KzB	Mihail Mikov
Vidin	ODS	Aleksandar Marinov
Vratsa	NDSV	Veselin Bliznakov
Vratsa	NDSV	Lilyana Krasteva
Vratsa	NDSV	Marina Vasileva
Vratsa	NDSV	Toshko Peykov
Vratsa	KzB	Georgi Bozhinov
Vratsa	KzB	Evgeniya Zhivkova
Vratsa	ODS	Asen Agov
Gabrobo	NDSV	Dilyana Grozdanova (Note: Silviya Badankova)
Gabrovo	NDSV	Todor Kosturski
Gabrovo	KzB	Tatyana Doncheva
Gabrovo	ODS	Evdokiya Maneva-Babulkova
Dobrich	DPS	Ahmed Dogan
Dobrich	DPS	Ahmed Yusein
Dobrich	DPS	Dzhevdet Chakarov
Dobrich	DPS	Ramadan Atalay
Dobrich	NDSV	Antoniya Parvanova
Dobrich	NDSV	Encho Malev
Dobrich	ODS	Dimitar Kamburov
Kardzhali	DPS	Ismet Saraliyski
Kardzhali	DPS	Lyutvi Mestan
Kardzhali	DPS	Remzi Osman
Kardzhali	DPS	Yunal Tasim
Kardzhali	DPS	Rasim Seidahmed (Note: Mehmed Dikme)
Kyustendil	NDSV	Borislav Vladimirov
Kyustendil	NDSV	Vanya Tsvetkova
Kyustendil	NDSV	Elka Atanasova
Kyustendil	KzB	Ivo Atanasov
Kyustendil	ODS	Stoycho Katsarov
Lovech	NDSV	Darinka Stancheva
Lovech	NDSV	Dimitar Dimitrov
Lovech	NDSV	Stela Angelova-Bankova
Lovech	KzB	Yanaki Stoilov
Lovech	ODS	Vladislav Kostov
Montana	NDSV	Borislav Velikov
Montana	NDSV	Margarita Kaneva
Montana	NDSV	Klara Petrova
Montana	KzB	Vasil Kalinov
Montana	KzB	Toma Tomov
Montana	ODS	Ivan G. Ivanov
Pazardzhik	NDSV	Valentin Miltenov
Pazardzhik	NDSV	Milena Milotinova-Koleva
Pazardzhik	NDSV	Penka Peneva
Pazardzhik	NDSV	(Note: Nikolay Nikolov) Lyutskan Dalakchiev
Pazardzhik	NDSV	Nadka Pangarova
Pazardzhik	KzB	Boyko Rashkov
Pazardzhik	KzB	Georgi Pirinski
Pazardzhik	ODS	Ekaterina Mihaylova
Pazardzhik	ODS	Panayot Lyakov
Pernik	NDSV	Teodora Yakimova-Drenska
Pernik	NDSV	Yavor Milushev
Pernik	NDSV	Marianna Asenova
Pernik	KzB	Brigo Asparuhov Dimitar Doychinov
Pernik	ODS	Valentin Vasilev
Pleven	NDSV	Aleksandar Filipov
Pleven	NDSV	Aneliya Mingova
Pleven	NDSV	Venko Aleksandrov
Pleven	NDSV	Petko Ganchev (Note: Nikolay Marinov)
Pleven	NDSV	Dimitar Stefanov
Pleven	KzB	Boyko Radoev
Pleven	KzB	Radoslav Ilievski
Pleven	KzB	Rumen Petkov
Pleven	ODS	Vasil Vasilev
Pleven	ODS	Ventsislav Varbanov
Plovdiv	NDSV	Valeri Tsekov
Plovdiv	NDSV	Vladimir Donchev
Plovdiv	NDSV	Yordan Pamukov
Plovdiv	NDSV	Nina Radeva
Plovdiv	NDSV	(Note: Milen Velchev) Tsonko Kirov
Plovdiv	ODS	Borislav Kitov
Plovdiv	ODS	Vasil Panitsa
Plovdiv	ODS	Ivan Kostov
Plovdiv	KzB	Ognyan Saparev
Plovdiv	KzB	Blagovest Sendov (Note: Zahari Georgiev) Atanaska Teneva
Plovdiv Obl.	NDSV	Dimitar Peychev
Plovdiv Obl.	NDSV	Kiril Milchev
Plovdiv Obl.	NDSV	Nikolay Buchkov
Plovdiv Obl.	NDSV	Nonka Matova
Plovdiv Obl.	NDSV	Plamen Mollov
Plovdiv Obl.	NDSV	Rupen Kirkoryan
Plovdiv Obl.	NDSV	Gergana Grancharova Vesela Nacheva (Note: Diyana Kostadinova)
Plovdiv Obl.	KzB	Petar Mutafchiev
Plovdiv Obl.	KzB	Borislav M. Borisov Donka Doncheva
Plovdiv Obl.	KzB	Ginyo Ganev (Note: Dimitar Marincheshki)
Plovdiv Obl.	ODS	Yordan Bakalov
Plovdiv Obl.	ODS	Muravey Radev
Razgrad	DPS	Emel Toshkova
Razgrad	DPS	Hasan Ademov
Razgrad	NDSV	Irena Marinova-Varadinova
Razgrad	NDSV	Kamen Vlahov
Razgrad	ODS	Nikola Nikolov
Ruse	NDSV	Daniel Valchev
Ruse	NDSV	Aneli Chobanova
Ruse	NDSV	(Note: Meglena Kuneva) Botyo Botev
Ruse	NDSV	Nikolay Chukanov
Ruse	NDSV	Teodora Litrova
Ruse	ODS	Ivo Tsanev Hristo Markov
Ruse	ODS	Teodora Gaydova
Ruse	KzB	Sergey Stanishev
Silistra	DPS	Kemal Adil (Note: Atanas Krastev)
Silistra	DPS	Hyusein Chaush (Note: Dzhevat Mehmed)
Silistra	NDSV	Silviya Neycheva (Note: Hristina Doneva)
Silistra	NDSV	Borislav Tsekov
Sliven	NDSV	Atanas Dodov
Sliven	NDSV	Kosta Tsonev
Sliven	NDSV	Krastanka Shakliyan
Sliven	NDSV	Kosta Kostov (Note: Stanimir Chakarov)
Sliven	KzB	Asen Gagauzov
Sliven	KzB	Evgeni Kirilov
Sliven	ODS	Mario Tagarinski
Smolyan	NDSV	(Note: Georgi Petkanov) Stoyan Kushlev
Smolyan	NDSV	Lyidmil Simeonov
Smolyan	KzB	Nikolay Kamov
Smolyan	ODS	Veselin Cherkezov
Sofia 23	NDSV	Mariya Angelieva-Koleva
Sofia 23	NDSV	Petya Gegova Gadar Hachikyan
Sofia 23	NDSV	Plamen Panayotov Daniela Nikiforova
Sofia 23	NDSV	Rumyana Georgieva (Note: Bozhidar Abrashev)
Sofia 23	NDSV	Ralitsa Agayn (Note: Tsvetoslav Krastev)
Sofia 23	ODS	Vladimir Dzhaferov
Sofia 23	ODS	Georgi Panev
Sofia 23	ODS	Dimitar Ignatov
Sofia 23	ODS	Kina Andreeva
Sofia 23	ODS	Mariya Spasova-Stoyanova
Sofia 23	KzB	Rumen Ovcharov
Sofia 23	KzB	Lyuben Petrov
Sofia 24	NDSV	(Note: Dolores Arsenova) Snezhina Chipeva (Note: Stanko Mihaylov)
Sofia 24	NDSV	Rumyan Mitev
Sofia 24	NDSV	Rymyana Stanoeva
Sofia 24	NDSV	(Note: Lyubka Kachakova) Tatyana Kalkanova
Sofia 24	NDSV	Ivan Iskrov Antonina Boneva
Sofia 24	ODS	Georgi Hubenov
Sofia 24	ODS	Ivan N. Ivanov
Sofia 24	ODS	Yordan Nihrizov
Sofia 24	ODS	Svetoslav Luchnikov Vasil Marinchev
Sofia 24	KzB	Georgi Anastasov
Sofia 24	KzB	Stefan Danailov
Sofia 25	NDSV	Borislav Spasov
Sofia 25	NDSV	Kameliya Kasabova
Sofia 25	NDSV	Ognyan Gerdzhikov
Sofia 25	NDSV	(Note: Georgi Paskov) Asen Durmishev
Sofia 25	NDSV	(Note: Kaloyan Ninov) Ivan Pavlov
Sofia 25	NDSV	(Note: Nikolay Svinarov) Nedyalko Kalachev
Sofia 25	ODS	Lachezar Toshev
Sofia 25	ODS	Nikolay Nikolov
Sofia 25	ODS	Evgeniy Bakardzhiev
Sofia 25	ODS	Aleksandar Pramatarski
Sofia 25	KzB	Vesela Lecheva
Sofia 25	KzB	Irina Bobkova (Note: Aleksandar Atanasov)
Sofia Obl.	NDSV	Vesela Draganova-Ilieva
Sofia Obl.	NDSV	Maruis Tsakov
Sofia Obl.	NDSV	Valeri Dimitrov (Note: Dimitar Sheytanov)
Sofia Obl.	NDSV	Konstantin Penchev (Note: Petko Nikolov) Milena Mihaylova-Yanakieva
Sofia Obl.	NDSV	Hristina Petrova (Note: Olimpi Katev) Nadya Atanasova
Sofia Obl.	KzB	Aleksandar Paunov
Sofia Obl.	KzB	Mladen Chervenyakov
Sofia Obl.	ODS	Anastasia Dimitrova-Moser
Stara Zagora	NDSV	Atanas Shterev
Stara Zagora	NDSV	Dimitar Lambovski
Stara Zagora	NDSV	Petya Bozhikova
Stara Zagora	NDSV	Hristo Mehandov
Stara Zagora	NDSV	Emil Koshlukov
Stara Zagora	KzB	Emiliya Maslarova
Stara Zagora	KzB	Yordan Dimov
Stara Zagora	KzB	(Note: Stoyan Aleksandrov) Dimitar Dimitrov
Stara Zagora	ODS	Monyo Hristov
Stara Zagora	ODS	Yordan Sokolov
Stara Zagora	ODS	Stefan Maznev
Targovishte	DPS	Kasim Dal
Targovishte	DPS	Chetin Kazak
Targovishte	KzB	Atanas Paparizov
Targovishte	NDSV	Stamen Stamenov
Haskovo	NDSV	Dimcho Dimchev
Haskovo	NDSV	Milena Paunova
Haskovo	NDSV	Valentin Tserovski Mima Nenkova
Haskovo	NDSV	Gospodin Chonkov
Haskovo	KzB	Angel Naydenov
Haskovo	KzB	Petar Agov
Haskovo	DPS	Mustafa Hasan
Haskovo	ODS	Evgeni Chachev
Shumen	NDSV	Borislav S. Borisov
Shumen	NDSV	Svetoslav Spasov
Shumen	NDSV	Yuliyana Petkova
Shumen	DPS	Naim Naim
Shumen	DPS	Yunal Lyufti
Shumen	KzB	Dimitar Dabov
Yambol	NDSV	(Note: Tanya Dimitrova) Nikola Nikolov Mincho Spasov
Yambol	NDSV	Mariya Gigova
Yambol	NDSV	Plamen Kenarov
Yambol	KzB	Lyuben Kornezov
Yambol	ODS	Mihail Mihaylov
