= List of members of the European Parliament for Bulgaria (2007) =

This is a list of the 18 appointed members of the European Parliament for Bulgaria in the 2004 to 2009 session, from 1 January 2007 to 20 May 2007.

== List ==
Name	National party	EP Group
Nedzhmi Ali	Movement for Rights and Freedoms	ALDE
Georgi Bliznashki	Socialist Party	PES
Mladen Chervenyakov	Socialist Party	PES
Christina Christova	National Movement Simeon II	ALDE
Konstantin Dimitrov	Democrats for a Strong Bulgaria	EPP–ED
Martin Dimitrov	Union of Democratic Forces	EPP–ED
Philip Dimitrov	Union of Democratic Forces	EPP–ED
Filiz Husmenova	Movement for Rights and Freedoms	ALDE
Stanimir Ilchev	National Movement Simeon II	ALDE
Tchetin Kazak	Movement for Rights and Freedoms	ALDE
Evgeni Kirilov	Socialist Party	PES
Marusya Lyubcheva	Socialist Party	PES
Atanas Paparizov	Socialist Party	PES
Antonyia Parvanova	National Movement Simeon II	ALDE
Lydia Shouleva	National Movement Simeon II	ALDE
Stefan Sofianski	People's Union	EPP–ED
Dimitar Stoyanov	Attack	IST
Kristian Vigenin	Socialist Party	PES
