= List of observers to the European Parliament for Bulgaria, 2005–2006 =

This is a list of the 18 appointed members of the European Parliament for Bulgaria in the 2004 to 2009 session. They were appointed by the National Assembly to be observers from 25 September 2005 until 31 December 2006 (one day before the accession of Bulgaria to the European Union). The observers group included 6 women. 7 of them joined ALDE, 6 joined PES, 4 joined EPP-ED, while remaining representant of Attack became member of Non-Inscrits.

== List ==
Name	National party	EP Group
Dimitar Abadjiev; Konstantin Dimitrov (after 1 December 2006)	Democrats for a Strong Bulgaria	EPP–ED
Nedzhmi Ali	Movement for Rights and Freedoms	ALDE
Alexander Arabadjiev	Coalition for Bulgaria	PES
Georgi Bliznashki	Socialist Party	PES
Maria Cappone	Union of Democratic Forces (Democratic Party)	EPP–ED
Martin Dimitrov	Union of Democratic Forces	EPP–ED
Hristina Hristova	National Movement Simeon II	ALDE
Filiz Husmenova	Movement for Rights and Freedoms	ALDE
Stanimir Ilchev	National Movement Simeon II	ALDE
Iglika Ivanova	Coalition for Bulgaria	PES
Tchetin Kazak	Movement for Rights and Freedoms	ALDE
Evgeni Kirilov	Socialist Party	PES
Atanas Paparizov	Socialist Party	PES
Antonyia Parvanova	National Movement Simeon II	ALDE
Lydia Shouleva	National Movement Simeon II	ALDE
Stefan Sofianski	People's Union	EPP–ED
Dimitar Stoyanov	Attack	NI
Kristian Vigenin	Socialist Party	PES
