= Stanishev Government =

Government of Bulgaria (2005–2009)

- 89th Cabinet of Bulgaria

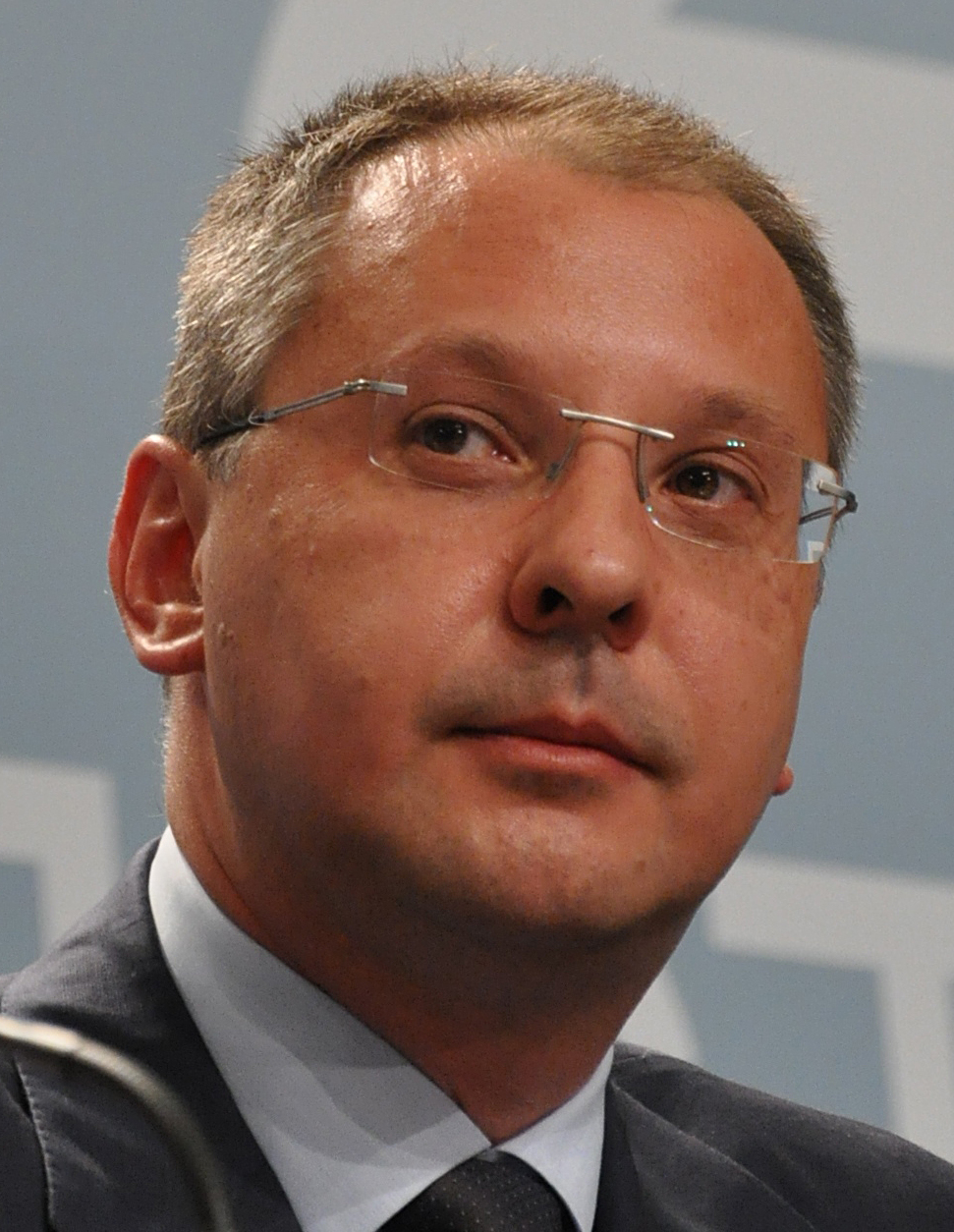
- Date formed: 16 August 2005
- Date dissolved: 27 July 2009

People and organisations
- Head of state: Georgi Parvanov
- Head of government: Sergei Stanishev
- Deputy head of government: See list: Ivaylo Kalfin (Foreign Affairs) Daniel Valchev (Education) Emel Etem Toshkova (Disaster Management Policy) Meglena Plugchieva (EU funds 2008-2009)
- Member parties: Bulgarian Socialist Party; National Movement Simeon II; Movement for Rights and Freedoms
- Status in legislature: Coalition Government

History
- Outgoing formation: Electoral Defeat (2009)
- Election: 2005
- Legislature term: 40th National Assembly
- Predecessor: Sakskoburggotski Government
- Successor: First Borisov Government

The eighty-ninth cabinet of Bulgaria, also known as the Three-party coalition cabinet (Bulgarian: Тройната коалиция) and the Stanishev Government, ruled from August 16, 2005, to July 27, 2009. The cabinet was formed with the coalition of the three leading parties at that time: BSP, NDSV and DPS, in order of their parliamentary representation. Their parliamentary representation also determined the number of cabinet appointments (8:5:3 respectively).

== Formation ==
Following the 2005 parliamentary elections no party won an outright majority. Almost a month after the election the first attempt to form a government was made. The Bulgarian Socialist Party, with 82 seats, reached a coalition agreement with the Movement for Rights and Freedoms, which had 34 seats. The proposed government would give the BSP 13 ministries and would give the MRF 5. Since the participating parties of the coalition only had 116 seats (out of 240) in the National Assembly, they would need the support of at least one of the other parties to support their minority coalition.

On Wednesday July 26 the first vote was supposed to be held but had to be postponed when opposition parties walked out of parliament, denying quorum.

The following day the Socialists succeeded in winning the support of the Bulgarian People's Union to hold a secret ballot. This move was designed to poach enough votes to form government. Sergei Stanishev, the chairman of the Socialist Party, narrowly won the vote to become Prime Minister: 120 "for", 119 "against" (1 absent). Stanishev then submitted his draft cabinet for approval, but it was rejected. The vote was tied in deciding the structure of the Council of ministers (119 "for" and "against") but its composition was defeated by a vote of 117 to 118. Claiming that the vote was rigged, Stanishev was able to schedule a new vote on Thursday to try to get approval for the draft cabinet. However, under pressure from the opposition and at least one constitutional judge who claimed a second vote would be unconstitutional, the Socialists admitted defeat and returned the exploratory mandate.

The leaders of the rightist parties then met with Simeon Sakskoburggotski, who would be next to receive a mandate from President Parvanov, to discuss a possible coalition. Former Prime Ministers Stefan Sofiyanski (Bulgarian People's Union) and Ivan Kostov (Democrats for a Strong Bulgaria) refused to support the "King's Party" if they nominated their leader for a second term at the helm of cabinet. Even with the support of the UtDF, DSB and the BNS such a coalition would be even smaller than the one just rejected by Parliament, holding only 103 seats. They would have to rely on the nationalist Attack for support after the Movement for Rights and Freedoms announced they would not support the possible coalition. The reason for the enmity between the MRF and NDSV was because the latter had withdrawn its support from an earlier deal with the BSP and the MRF. Realizing it would be impossible to form a government without the inclusion of the Socialists, the King's Party reached out to them to form a broad coalition. This move angered the hardline Democrats for Strong Bulgaria who broke off talks with the NDSV, driving the nail into the coffin that was the possibility of a center-right coalition government.

Stanishev sent a personal letter to Sakskoburggotski with 12 questions to see if a coalition was possible. After being satisfied by only 2 of the responses, he rejected the idea of forming a government under the second mandate and started negotiations under the third mandate. Citing the "complicated political situation in the country" the NDSV decided not to exercise its right to nominate a prime minister-designate and try to form a government on August 11.

According to article 99 (3) the President now had to consult with parties and then entrust the third mandate with one of the minor parties. Even though Parvanov consulted with all the parties, it was viewed that only the BSP, NDSV (having made a U-turn and was back working with the Socialists), MRF and BPU could form a coalition. After discussions wrapped up the President dealt the third mandate to the Movement for Rights and Freedoms who nominated Sergei Stanishev for Prime Minister. He was approved by a vote of 168 to 67. The structure cabinet was approved 169-67 and its line-up was approved 169–68.

On January 1, 2007, during his term, the European Union accepted Bulgaria as a member, after several previous governments prepared the country's membership in this structure. There is also a significant increase in the standard of living, with an almost double increase in the average salary in Bulgaria from BGN 354 (2006) to about BGN 600 (2009). For the same period the minimum pension jumps from BGN 85 to BGN 136. The tripartite coalition is also introducing the lowest flat tax in the EU - 10%, which stimulates business activity. Stanishev's government also managed to keep education spending at around 4.3% of GDP, increasing from BGN 1.65 to 2.2 billion in 2004–2007. Science has been supported by the purchase of a supercomputer, which as of November 2009 is the 377th most powerful in the world and is used for medical research, seismological and construction calculations.

On 23 July 2008, the European Commission suspended interim payments under the Roads Fund on suspicion of a conflict of interest and the authorities' inability to fight corruption. The opposition, led by DSB, UDF and GERB, launched a petition for the resignation of the government, which collected more than 1 million signatures, but the petition was taken lightly by Prime Minister Stanishev with the words: "Hello, circus performers." According to Stanishev, the subscription was forged because names and signatures were repeated.

At the end of 2008 and the beginning of 2009 the country was covered by mass protests and unrest of the citizens! Teachers were also protesting. Clashes between citizens and police broke out in front of the parliament and in other cities of the country. Despite the protests that lasted for months, Stanishev's cabinet never resigned.

The inconsistent management of Stanishev's cabinet and leaked information about corruption in power led to a heavy defeat for Stanishev and the BSP in the 2009 parliamentary elections, and it turned into opposition. Their coalition partner, the NDSV, led by Bulgaria's former tsar and prime minister Simeon Saxe-Coburg-Gotha, won less than 4% of the votes and failed to get any seats in the National Assembly. Ministers from Boyko Borissov's next cabinet pass on to the prosecutor's office a number of allegations of misuse of state and European funds by ministers from Stanishev's cabinet. Despite the heavy loss of the elections and subsequent party scandals, Stanishev refused to resign and remained at the helm of the BSP.

== Cabinet ==
=== Original Composition ===
Ministry	Minister	Party
Prime Minister	Sergei Stanishev	BSP
Deputy Prime Minister and Minister of Foreign Affairs	Ivaylo Kalfin	BSP
Deputy Prime Minister and Minister of Education and Science	Daniel Valchev	NDSV
Deputy Prime Minister and Minister of Disaster Management Policy	Emel Etem Toshkova	DPS
Minister of Finance	Plamen Oresharski	Independent
Minister of Interior	Rumen Petkov	BSP
Minister of Defence	Veselin Bliznakov	NDSV
Minister of Justice	Georgi Petkanov	NDSV
Minister of Economy and Energy	Rumen Ovcharov	BSP
Minister of Public Administration and Administrative Reform	Nikolay Vassilev	NDSV
Minister of Transport	Petar Mutafchiev	BSP
Minister of Regional Development and Public Works	Asen Gagauzov	BSP
Minister of Environment and Water	Dzhevdet Chakarov	DPS
Minister of Agriculture and Forestry	Nihat Kabil	DPS
Minister of Labour and Social Policy	Emilia Maslarova	BSP
Minister of Health	Radoslav Gaydarski	BSP
Minister of Culture	Stefan Danailov	BSP
Minister of European Affairs	Meglena Kuneva	NDSV

=== Changes on December 21, 2006 ===
With the election of Meglena Kuneva as the first Bulgarian European commissioner she was relieved from her duties as Minister of European Affairs. Her successor, Gergana Grancharova (NDSV) did not take office until March 16 of the following year.

=== Changes on July 18, 2007 ===
Miglena Tacheva (NDSV) takes over the Ministry of Justice.

Petar Dimitrov (BSP) takes over the Ministry of Economy and Energy.

The Ministry of Agriculture and Forestry is reorganized into the Ministry of Agriculture and Food Supply. Its minister, Nihat Kabil, stays on.

=== Changes on April 24, 2008 ===
Rumen Petkov resigned as Minister of Interior on April 13 after a scandal broke exposing links between him and his staff and suspected organized criminals. This prompted a major cabinet shuffle on April 24. On that day Mikhail Mikov (BSP) was sworn in as the new Minister of Interior.

The number of Deputy Prime Ministers was increased by one when Meglena Plugchieva (BSP) was assigned to the role. She was also assigned to oversee the funds from the EU. This appointment came after criticisms from the EU about Bulgaria's poor management of EU money.

The Ministry of Disaster Management Policy was reorganized into the Ministry of Emergency Situations. Its minister, Emel Etem Toshkova, remained a deputy Prime Minister.

The Ministry of Agriculture and Food Supply was reorganized as the Ministry of Agriculture and Food. After criticisms for failing to prevent misuse of funds in the Ministry, the new portfolio was taken over by Valeri Tsvetanov (DPS).

Veselin Bliznakov, who was blamed for having failure in modernization reform, was replaced by Nikolai Tsonev (NDSV) as Minister of Defence.

Radoslav Gaidarski, blamed for lagging reforms in the healthcare sector, was replaced by Evgeni Zhelev (BSP) as Minister of Health.

== Electoral Defeat and Resignation ==
The 2009 parliamentary election resulted in a victory for the new conservative party Citizens for European Development of Bulgaria who won 117 seats. The ruling socialists lost just over half their seats and were reduced to 40, while the NDSV failed to cross the 4% threshold and did not enter parliament. Only the DPS increased its representation, by 3, to win 37 seats.

On 22 July 2009 parliament accepted the resignation of the three party coalition with 209 votes for, 1 against and 26 abstentions.

== See also ==
- History of Bulgaria since 1989
