= 1st MMC – Blagoevgrad =

Bulgarian constituency

Coordinates: 41°45′N 23°15′E

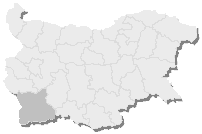
Map of Bulgaria, 1st MMC - Blagoevgrad is highlighted

1st Multi-member Constituency - Blagoevgrad is a constituency whose borders are the same as Blagoevgrad Province.

== Background ==
In the 2009 Bulgarian parliamentary election, 1st MMC – Blagoevgrad elected 10 members in the Bulgarian National Assembly, 9 of which were through proportionality vote and 1 was through first-past-the-post voting.

== Members ==
=== 2005 ===
Proportional representation
Election	Member	Party
2005	Lyuben Kornezov	KB
2005	Georgi Yurukov	KB
2005	Snezhana Grozdilova	NDSV
2005	Marina Dikova	NDSV
2009	Aliosman Imamov	DPS
2005	Nahet Zia	DPS
2005	Yane Yanev	ODS
2005	Yasen Popvasilev	ODS
2005	Yelena Maseva	DSB
2005	Boris Yachev	BNS

=== 2009 ===
First-past-the-post
Election	Member	Party
2009	Lyben Tatarski	GERB

Proportional representation
First Elected	Member	Party
2005	Aliosman Imamov	DPS
2009	Atanas Kambitov	GERB
2009	Georgi Andonov	GERB
2009	Georgi Ikonomov	GERB
2009	Korneliya Ninova	KB
2009	Mitko Zahov	GERB
2009	Musa Palev	DPS
2009	Ognyan Tetimov	Ataka
2005	Yane Yanev	RZS

== Elections ==
2009 election

- proportionality vote

Party	Votes	%	Change	Seats	Change
Citizens for European Development of Bulgaria	69,710	37.68		4	+4
Movement for Rights and Freedoms	32,811	17.74		2	-1
Coalition for Bulgaria	24,601	13.30		1	-1
Order, Lawfulness, Justice	18,259	9.87		1	+1
National Union Attack	12,064	6.52		1	+1
Blue Coalition	11,518	6.23		0	-3
Others	16,022	8.66		—	—
Total Turnout 61.63%	184,985	100.00	—	9	-3

- first-past-the-post voting

Party	Candidate	Votes	%
Citizens for European Development of Bulgaria	Lyuben Tatarski	68,690	37.30
Order, Lawfulness, Justice	Yane Yanev	27,221	14.78
Coalition for Bulgaria	Asen Zlatev	23,888	12.97
Movement for Rights and Freedoms	Ahmed Bashev	33,309	18.09
National Union Attack	Ognyan Tetimov	10,529	5.72
Others		20,536	11.15
Total		184,173	100.00

== See also ==
- 2009 Bulgarian parliamentary election
- Politics of Bulgaria
- List of Bulgarian Constituencies
