= Ivan Sotirov (politician) =

Bulgarian engineer and politician

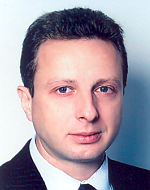

Member of the National Assembly of Bulgaria

Personal details
- Born: 29 July 1963 (age 62) Sofia, Bulgaria
- Occupation: Politician, engineer

Ivan Georgiev Sotirov (Bulgarian: Иван Георгиев Сотиров; 29 July 1963, Sofia, Bulgaria) is a Bulgarian engineer and politician from the Union of Democratic Forces (SDS), deputy chairman of the party. He is a member of the SDS parliamentary group in the XXXVII National Assembly and of the United Democratic Forces (ODS) parliamentary group in the XL National Assembly. He speaks English and Russian.

== Biography ==
Ivan Sotirov was born on 29 July 1963 in Sofia, Bulgaria. In 1981 he graduated from the Sofia Mathematical High School. In 1987 he graduated from the Technical University of Sofia with a degree in Lifting and Transportation Machines and Systems.

In 1987 he became an engineer in the company "Roads and Facilities" – Sofia. Since 1991 he has been an engineer at the "Autobase" of the Medical Academy – Sofia. In 1997, he became a member of the board of directors of Balkankar Holding EAD, and in 2000 he was elected chairman of the supervisory board of the company.

=== Political career ===
In 1990 he became a member of the SDS. He was elected a member of the XXXVII National Assembly, then became chairman of the municipal organization of the SDS in the central Sofia district of Sredets, where he was also mayor from 2003 to 2005.

In the 2005 parliamentary elections in Bulgaria he was elected as an MP from the ODS list in 25th MMC – Sofia.
