= Dilyana Grozdanova =

Bulgarian politician (1957–2025)

- Диляна Грозданова

Member of the National Assembly of Bulgaria
- In office 5 July 2001 – 17 June 2005

Personal details
- Born: 4 November 1957; Sofia, Bulgaria
- Died: 22 April 2025 (aged 67); Sofia, Bulgaria
- Political party: SSD
- Education: Sofia University
- Occupation: Journalist

Dilyana Grozdanova (Bulgarian: Диляна Грозданова; 4 November 1957 – 22 April 2025) was a Bulgarian politician. A member of the Union of Free Democrats, she served in the National Assembly from 2001 to 2005.

Grozdanova died in Sofia on 22 April 2025, at the age of 67.
