= Stoyan Alexandrov =

Bulgarian economist (1949–2020)

Stoyan Alexandrov (Bulgarian: Стоян Александров; 14 June 1949 – 24 August 2020) was a Bulgarian economist, and the Minister of Finance under Prime Minister Lyuben Berov.

== Biography ==
Alexandrov was born in Iliya, Kystendil. A graduate of the Svishtov Academy of Economics, he was the President of the Directors' Council, Chief Executive Director of the CCB, and President of the Governing Council of the Association of Commerce Banks.

Previously from 1975 until 1993, Alexandrov was a lecturer at the University of National and World Economy and was the Bulgarian Socialist Party candidate for Mayor of Sofia in 2003, losing to Stefan Sofianski. He was the manager of the Turkish Dbank from 2006 to 2020. He died in Sofia, aged 71.
