= Dolores Arsenova =

Bulgarian politician

- Долорес Арсенова
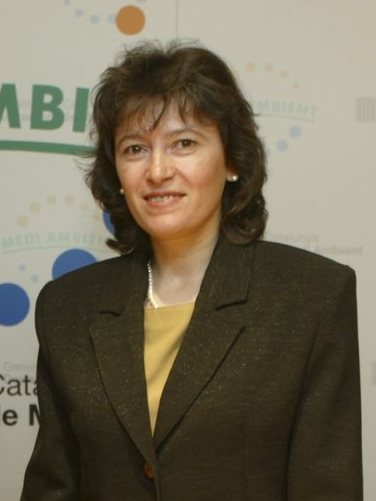
- Arsenova in 2003

Minister of Environment and Water of Bulgaria
- In office 24 July 2001 – 17 August 2005
- Prime Minister: Simeon II
- Preceded by: Evdokiya Maneva
- Succeeded by: Dzhevdet Chakarov

Personal details
- Born: 7 May 1964 (age 61) Belimel, Bulgaria
- Party: National Movement for Stability and Progress

Dolores Borisova Arsenova (Bulgarian: Долорес Борисова Арсенова; born 7 May 1964) is a Bulgarian politician who served as Minister of Environment and Water in the cabinet of Simeon II. She was also a member of parliament, representing the National Movement for Stability and Progress.

== Personal background ==
Arsenova was born in the small village of Belimel in Bulgaria.

=== Educational background ===
In 1990, Arsenova graduated with a teaching degree from St. Clement of Ohrid University of Sofia. In 1995, she received her law degree from the University for National and World Economics (UNWE) in Sofia.

== Professional background ==
In 1996, Arsenova began working in law, becoming a member of the Sofia Bar Association. Her focus included providing legal advice and serving as a management consultant working with nonprofit organizations. In 1999, she was honored with a fellowship of the Global and Regional Development Section at the Sociology Institute with the Bulgarian Academy of Sciences.

On 24 July 2001, Arsenova set her legal career aside when she became a Member of Parliament. She was appointed as the Minister of Environment and Waters in the cabinet of Simeon II, with the Government of the National Movement Simeon II.

Arsenova is a member of the Bulgarian Sociology Association.

== Media appearances ==
Arsenova drew the attention of the IRS and the journalists on Nova Television's "Tax the rich struck from the air", which was broadcast on 1 October 2010.

== Docetaxel cancer medicine ==
In February 2010, Arsenova and her husband came under scrutiny when they were accused of fraud by purchasing Docetaxel chemotherapy medication, in India and selling it with a surcharge three times higher to Bulgaria's health ministry. According to the accusation Arsenova's company, Biomars Ltd., took a profit of approximately US$980 per bottle of the medication.

Cancer patients and patients rights advocates claimed that the inflated prices of the medicine resulted in a drastic shortage of medication for oncology diseases, causing decreasing health and/or death for cancer patients throughout the country.

On 26 February, Arsenova appeared on the morning broadcast of "This Morning", on bTV channel. Her appearance caused controversy, when she failed to clear her name or that of her husband, simply stating, "It is a lie that the company of my husband has siphoned off the state budget." She refused to disclose the price at which the medicine was purchased in India, claiming that the financial transaction was confidential.
