= 2022 Bulgarian parliamentary election =

- 2 October 2022
- All 240 seats in the 48th National Assembly; 121 seats needed for a majority
- Turnout: 39.30% (▼0.74pp)
Party	Leader	Vote %	Seats	+/–
GERB–SDS	Boyko Borisov	24.48	67	+8
PP	K. Petkov & A. Vassilev	19.52	53	−14
DPS	Mustafa Karadayi	13.29	36	+2
Revival	Kostadin Kostadinov	9.83	27	+14
BSPzB	Korneliya Ninova	8.98	25	−1
DB	Hristo Ivanov	7.19	20	+4
BV	Stefan Yanev	4.47	12	New
This lists parties that won seats. See the complete results below.
Distribution of seats by electoral district and largest party by district
Prime Minister before	Prime Minister after
Galab Donev (caretaker); Independent (First Donev Government)	Galab Donev (caretaker); Independent (Second Donev Government)

Early parliamentary elections were held in Bulgaria on 2 October 2022 to elect members of the 48th National Assembly. The snap election was called after the fall of the Petkov Government, a four-party coalition, in June 2022. This was the fourth parliamentary election since 2021, an unprecedented situation in Bulgarian history, the previous elections being the April, July, and November 2021 elections.

As in the previous snap elections, no party secured a majority. The GERB–SDS alliance emerged as the largest bloc with 67 seats and was assigned the task of forming a government by President Rumen Radev, but their efforts failed. Radev then granted the We Continue the Change party and later the BSP for Bulgaria coalition a mandate to form a government, but both were unsuccessful. As a result, Radev scheduled another parliamentary election, the fifth in two years, to take place on 2 April 2023. Turnout was at 39%, the lowest since 1990.

== Background ==
The 2021 Bulgarian general election in November saw We Continue the Change (PP) achieve a surprise victory, receiving 25% of the vote. Led by Kiril Petkov and Assen Vassilev, the PP formed a coalition government with BSP for Bulgaria (BSPzB), There Is Such a People (ITN) and Democratic Bulgaria (DB). This broke the deadlock that had arisen as a result of the previous two parliamentary elections, after which no party was able to form a government.

On 8 June 2022, ITN withdrew from the government, citing disagreements over the state budget, fiscal policy and the lifting of Bulgaria's veto on opening EU accession talks with North Macedonia. On 22 June, the government was defeated in a no confidence vote tabled by GERB and supported by DPS, ITN and Revival.

== Electoral system ==
The 240 members of the National Assembly are elected by open list proportional representation from 31 multi-member constituencies ranging in size from 4 to 16 seats. The electoral threshold is 4% for parties, with seats allocated according to the largest remainder method.

== Political groups ==
The table below lists the political party groups represented in the 47th National Assembly.

Name		Ideology	Position	Leader(s)	2021 result		Seats at dissolution	Petkov Government	
Name		Ideology	Position	Leader(s)	Votes (%)	Seats	Seats at dissolution	13 December 2021	8 June 2022
PP	We Continue the Change; Продължаваме промяната	Social liberalism Anti-corruption	Centre	Kiril Petkov; Assen Vassilev	25.3%	67 / 240	67 / 240	Government	
GERB–SDS	GERB-Union of Democratic Forces; ГЕРБ-Съюз на демократичните сили	Conservatism	Centre-right	Boyko Borisov	22.4%	59 / 240	59 / 240	Opposition	
DPS	Movement for Rights and Freedoms; Движение за права и свободи	Turkish minority interests	Centre	Mustafa Karadayi	12.8%	34 / 240	34 / 240	Opposition	
BSPzB	BSP for Bulgaria; БСП за България	Social democracy	Left-wing	Korneliya Ninova	10.1%	26 / 240	26 / 240	Government	
ITN	There Is Such a People; Има такъв народ	Populism	Big tent	Slavi Trifonov	9.4%	25 / 240	19 / 240	Government	Opposition
DB	Democratic Bulgaria; Демократична България	Liberalism	Centre to centre-right	Hristo Ivanov; Atanas Atanasov	6.3%	16 / 240	16 / 240	Government	
Revival	Revival; Възраждане	Ultranationalism	Far-right	Kostadin Kostadinov	4.8%	13 / 240	12 / 240	Opposition	
Independent	Independent; Independent	—N/a	—N/a	—N/a	—N/a	0 / 240	7 / 240	—N/a	Split support

== Competing parties ==
Name			№	Main ideology	Leader(s)	November 2021 result	
Name			№	Main ideology	Leader(s)	Votes (%)	Seats
DPS		Movement for Rights and Freedoms	1	Turkish minority interests Social liberalism	Mustafa Karadayi	12.83%	34 / 240
BSDD		Bulgarian Union for Direct Democracy	2	Direct democracy	Georgi Nedelchev; Svetla Milusheva	0.22%	0 / 240
BNO		Bulgarian National Unification	3	Bulgarian nationalism	Georgi Georgiev-Goti	0.09%	0 / 240
NDE		Unity National Movement	4	Pro-Europeanism	Nikola Ivanov	New	
VMRO–BND		VMRO – Bulgarian National Movement	5	Bulgarian nationalism National conservatism	Iskren Veselinov; Angel Dzhambazki; Alexander Sidi; Yulian Angelov	1.07%	0 / 240
A Just; Bulgaria	OSD	United Social Democracy	6	Social democracy	Yordan Gergov	DNP	
A Just; Bulgaria	PDS	Political Movement "Social Democrats"	6	Social democracy	Elena Noneva	PP	0 / 240
A Just; Bulgaria	KOY	Competence, Responsibility and Truth	6	Right-wing	Svetozar Saev	DNP	
PD		Direct Democracy	7	Direct democracy	Petar Klisarov	0.05%	0 / 240
NFSB		National Front for the Salvation of Bulgaria	8	Bulgarian nationalism National conservatism	Valeri Simeonov	0.32% (PF)	0 / 240
We; Continue the Change	PP	We Continue the Change	9	Social liberalism Anti-corruption	Kiril Petkov; Assen Vassilev	25.32%	67 / 240
We; Continue the Change	Volt	Volt Bulgaria	9	European federalism	Nastimir Ananiev	25.32%	67 / 240
We; Continue the Change	SEC	Middle European Class	9	Economic liberalism	Georgi Manev	25.32%	67 / 240
MIR		Morality, Initiative and Patriotism	10	Conservatism	Simeon Slavchev	0.15%	0 / 240
KOD		Conservative Union of the Right	11	National conservatism Right-wing populism	Petar Moskov	0.42% (NOD)	0 / 240
BTR		Bulgaria of Labor and Reason	12	Anti-Atlanticism; Euroscepticism	Georgi Manolov	DNP	
KTB		Coalition for You Bulgaria	13	Centre-right	Krasimir Manov	DNP	
Revival		Revival	14	Bulgarian nationalism Right-wing populism	Kostadin Kostadinov	4.80%	13 / 240
Bulgarian; Rise	BV	Bulgarian Rise	15	National conservatism Souverainism	Stefan Yanev	New	
Bulgarian; Rise	Svoboda	Freedom	15	Bulgarian nationalism	Vladimir Simeonov	DNP	
Bulgarian; Rise	Zelenite	Party of the Greens	15	Green politics Anti-capitalism	Vladimir Nikolov	DNP	
Bulgarian; Rise	ZNS	Agrarian People's Union	15	Agrarianism; Conservatism	Rumen Yonchev	IBG-NI	0 / 240
Bulgarian; Rise	ABV	Alternative for Bulgarian Revival	15	Social democracy Social conservatism	Vladimir Nikolov	BSPzB	1 / 240
Bulgarian; Rise	SSD	Union of Free Democrats	15	Conservatism	Radoslav Katsarov	DNP	
BNS–ND		Bulgarian National Union – New Democracy	16	Ultranationalism; Anti-immigration	Boyan Rasate	0.04%	0 / 240
IS.BG		Stand Up, Bulgaria	17	Anti-corruption; Direct democracy	Maya Manolova	2.26% (IBG-NI)	0 / 240
DNK		Movement of Independent Candidates	18	Left-wing populism Direct democracy	Boyko Mladenov; Boyko Nikifirov; Mincho Hristov; Ognyan Boyukliev	BSPzB	0 / 240
ITN		There Is Such a People	19	Populism; Social conservatism	Slavi Trifonov	9.39%	25 / 240
GN		People's Voice	20	Euroscepticism; Populism	Svetoslav Vitkov	0.43%	0 / 240
ENP		United People's Party	21	Liberalism; Economic liberalism	Valentina Vasileva	IBG-NI	0 / 240
Pravoto		Pravoto	22	Populism	Maria Koleva	0.25%	0 / 240
ISI		Truth and Only the Truth	23	Anti-vaccination; Bulgarian nationalism	Ventsislav Angelov	DNP	
GERB– SDS	GERB	GERB	24	Conservatism; Populism	Boyko Borisov	22.44%	59 / 240
GERB– SDS	SDS	Union of Democratic Forces	24	National conservatism Christian democracy	Rumen Hristov	22.44%	59 / 240
Democratic; Bulgaria	DB	Yes, Bulgaria!	25	Liberalism	Hristo Ivanov	6.28%	16 / 240
Democratic; Bulgaria	DSB	Democrats for a Strong Bulgaria	25	Conservatism; Conservative liberalism	Atanas Atanasov	6.28%	16 / 240
Democratic; Bulgaria	ZD	Green Movement	25	Green politics Green liberalism	Borislav Sandov; Vladislav Panev	6.28%	16 / 240
BSDE		Bulgarian Euro-Left	26	Social democracy	Aleksandar Tomov	0.52%	0 / 240
Ataka		Attack	27	Bulgarian nationalism Right-wing populism	Volen Siderov	0.46%	0 / 240
BSP for Bulgaria	BSP	Bulgarian Socialist Party	28	Social democracy Left-wing nationalism	Korneliya Ninova	10.07%	26 / 240
BSP for Bulgaria	EG	Ecoglasnost	28	Green politics Environmentalism	Emil Georgiev	10.07%	26 / 240
BSP for Bulgaria	Trakiya	Trakiya Political Club	28	Bulgarian nationalism Thracian Bulgarian interests	Stefan Nachev	10.07%	26 / 240
RVO		Russophiles for the Revival of the Fatherland	29	Russophilia; National conservatism	Nikolay Malinov	0.26%	0 / 240

== Opinion polls ==
Graphical representation of recalculated data

Local regression of polls conducted

The opinion poll results below were recalculated from the original data and exclude polls that chose "I will not vote" or "I am uncertain" options.

Polling firm	Fieldwork date	Sample	PP	DB	GERB– SDS	DPS	BSP	ITN	Revival	IS.BG	VMRO	BV	Others	None of the above	Lead
2022 election	2 October 2022	—	19.5	7.2	24.5	13.3	9.0	3.7	9.8	1.0	0.8	4.5	3.4	3.4	5.0
Gallup	Exit poll	—	18.8	7.4	24.7	14.5	10.8	4.6	10.2	1.2	0.9	4.0	2.9	—	5.9
Alpha Research	27–29 Sep 2022	1,025	16.5	8.4	25.2	13.1	10.2	4.0	11.0	1.9	1.8	4.4	3.5	—	8.7
Trend	21–27 Sep 2022	1,001	16.4	7.6	25.7	11.9	8.7	4.2	13.9	2.0	1.2	4.4	4.0	—	9.3
Gallup	20–27 Sep 2022	1,009	16.6	7.8	25.8	13.2	9.2	4.2	12.8	1.9	1.2	4.0	3.3	—	9.2
Sova Harris	22–26 Sep 2022	1,000	19.0	5.7	27.5	12.5	12.1	4.6	9.5	2.9	1.1	4.2	0.9	—	8.5
Exacta	20–25 Sep 2022	1,050	16.8	8.0	26.4	12.6	10.8	4.5	10.5	—	—	4.2	5.6	0.6	9.6
Market Links	17–23 Sep 2022	1,024	16.9	7.8	23.7	12.3	9.9	3.9	8.7	2.5	—	2.5	11.8	—	6.8
Mediana	16–22 Sep 2022	1,008	16.3	5.9	26.3	11.5	13.1	4.7	12.0	3.0	—	5.2	2.0	—	10.0
SINPI	16–21 Sep 2022	1,104	16.6	7.8	24.5	13.8	9.7	4.6	12.1	1.8	0.9	4.1	5.5	1.3	7.9
Center for Analysis and Marketing	15–19 Sep 2022	1,011	18.2	8.1	24.8	12.8	11.2	3.8	10.5	—	—	3.3	—	—	6.6
Estat	10–17 Sep 2022	1,005	16.8	6.9	26.1	10.3	9.3	4.2	10.1	1.9	1	4.8	5.2	3.4	9.3
Exacta	10–17 Sep 2022	1,050	18.1	7.5	26.2	10.3	12.5	5.4	9.5	—	—	4	5.5	1	8.1
Sova Harris	6–12 Sep 2022	835	18.8	5.7	28.8	8.7	12.7	5.1	10.4	2.9	1.2	4.8	0.9	—	10.0
Gallup	2–10 Sep 2022	1,002	19.2	7.6	25.9	11.5	9.8	4.3	11.3	1.7	1.5	4.2	3	—	6.7
Mediana	29 Aug – 4 Sep 2022	1,008	17.1	5.5	22.8	11.1	13.3	6.9	12.5	3.4	—	5.5	1.9	—	5.7
Market Links	27 Aug – 3 Sep 2022	1,067	17.8	8.1	22.9	10.9	10.9	3.8	7.6	—	—	4.7	13.5	—	5.1
Alpha Research	27 Aug – 2 Sep 2022	1,117	18.9	8.1	25.3	11.8	10.6	4.2	10.3	2.2	—	4.5	4.1	—	6.4
Trend	15–22 Aug 2022	1,007	19.6	7.3	24.4	10.6	8.6	3.9	10.3	1.9	1.2	4.5	4.6	3.1	4.8
Market Links	30 Jul – 5 Aug 2022	1,020	26.2		22.6	12.4	11.6	3.2	8.9	—	—	3.3	11.8	—	3.6
Market Links	30 Jul – 5 Aug 2022	1,020	20.9	9.1	24.5	12.6	11.9	3.1	9.2	—	—	4.3	4.8	—	3.6
Trend	5–12 Jul 2022	1,005	21.4	6.9	23.6	10.7	9.8	3.8	9.6	1.6	1.1	5.7	2.8	3.0	2.2
Market Links	2–10 Jul 2022	1,024	21.5	8.3	22.2	9.1	11.6	3.2	7.6	—	—	4.3	12.2	—	0.7
Alpha Research	25 Jun – 1 Jul 2022	1,017	22.5	7.9	23.9	9.8	12.8	3.7	8.8	—	—	6.0	4.7	—	1.4
June–July 2022		ITN pulls out of the Petkov cabinet and the government is defeated in a vote of no confidence													
Trend	4–11 May 2022	1,002	17.5	6.8	23.8	10.9	9.5	5.8	10.1	2.0	1.5	7.6	2.2	2.3	6.3
Centre for Analysis and Marketing	4–9 May 2022	821	21.4	6.0	23.3	11.6	11.8	5.1	8.7	1.2	1.0	7.8	2.1	–	1.9
Market Links	29 Apr – 8 May 2022	1,015	19.1	8.3	25.9	10.5	12.5	6.5	9.7	–	–	–	7.2	–	6.8
Gallup	29 Apr – 6 May 2022	805	18.2	5.5	24.9	11.1	9.7	5.4	10.5	1.1	1.5	5.6	6.5	–	6.7
Alpha Research	8–14 Apr 2022	1,037	21.1	7.7	24.8	8.7	11.7	5.1	10.8	–	–	–	10.2	–	3.7
Trend	6–13 Apr 2022	1,004	20.1	7.1	23.6	11.1	10.5	6.9	9.3	1.9	1.3	–	5.5	2.7	3.5
Gallup	31 Mar – 8 Apr 2022	809	23.8	4.5	25.9	10.6	10.3	7.0	7.9	1.2	2.1	–	5.6	1.1	2.1
Market Links	22–29 Mar 2022	1,029	19.7	7.6	22.1	8.2	11.6	6.7	8.2	–	–	–	15.9	–	2.4
Trend	5–12 Mar 2022	1,007	22.9	7.4	21.9	11.4	10.4	7.5	7.3	2.1	1.3	–	5.0	2.8	1.0
Alpha Research	6–14 Feb 2022	1,060	29.9	7.8	22.2	8.8	12.0	8.1	6.4	–	–	–	4.9	—	7.7
Gallup	3–11 Feb 2022	803	30.2	5.2	21.9	12.2	8.5	9.4	3.9	1.5	1.7	–	5.4	—	8.3
Trend	12–19 Jan 2022	1,004	26.4	6.8	22.3	10.9	11.5	8.1	5.9	1.9	1.1	–	2.7	2.4	4.1
November 2021 election	14 November 2021	—	25.7	6.4	22.7	13.0	10.2	9.5	4.9	2.3	1.1	–	4.2	1.3	2.8

== Results ==
Party	Votes	%	Seats	+/–
GERB–SDS	634,627	24.48	67	+8
We Continue the Change	506,099	19.52	53	–14
Movement for Rights and Freedoms	344,512	13.29	36	+2
Revival	254,952	9.83	27	+14
BSP for Bulgaria	232,958	8.98	25	–1
Democratic Bulgaria	186,528	7.19	20	+4
Bulgarian Rise	115,872	4.47	12	+12
There Is Such a People	96,071	3.71	0	–25
Stand Up.BG	25,207	0.97	0	0
VMRO – Bulgarian National Movement	20,177	0.78	0	0
Movement of Independent Candidates	10,324	0.40	0	New
A Just Bulgaria (OSD– PDS–KOY)	9,124	0.35	0	New
Attack	7,593	0.29	0	0
Russophiles for the Revival of the Fatherland	6,533	0.25	0	0
People's Voice	6,197	0.24	0	0
Bulgarian Union for Direct Democracy	5,874	0.23	0	0
Bulgarian Euro-Left	5,343	0.21	0	0
Coalition for You Bulgaria	5,097	0.20	0	New
Conservative Union of the Right	5,028	0.19	0	0
Morality, Initiative and Patriotism	4,536	0.17	0	0
Direct Democracy	4,061	0.16	0	0
Unity National Movement	4,039	0.16	0	New
National Front for the Salvation of Bulgaria	3,520	0.14	0	0
Bulgaria of Labor and Reason	2,636	0.10	0	New
People's Party "Truth and Only the Truth"	2,522	0.10	0	New
Bulgarian National Union – New Democracy	1,849	0.07	0	0
Pravoto	1,757	0.07	0	0
Bulgarian National Unification	1,671	0.06	0	0
Independents	564	0.02	0	0
None of the above	87,635	3.38	–	–
Total	2,592,906	100.00	240	0
Valid votes	2,592,906	99.65		
Invalid/blank votes	9,042	0.35		
Total votes	2,601,948	100.00		
Registered voters/turnout	6,620,820	39.30		
Source: Electoral Commission of Bulgaria

=== Voter demographics ===
Alpha Research exit polling suggested the following demographic breakdown. The parties that got below 4% of the vote are included in "Others".

Voter demographics
Social group	% GERB–SDS	% PP	% DPS	% Revival	% BSP	% DB	% BV	% ITN	% Others	% Lead
Exit poll result	25	20	14	10	10	8	4	4	5	5
Final result	25.3	20.2	13.8	10.1	9.3	7.5	4.6	3.8	5.4	5.1
Gender
Men	24	18	16	12	9	7	4	4	6	6
Women	28	23	10	7	11	9	3	3	6	5
Age
18–30	18	28	15	10	5	10	2	6	6	10
30-60	28	19	13	11	7	9	4	4	5	9
60+	27	16	10	7	26	5	4	2	3	1
Highest Level of Education
Lower education	16	7	50	6	9	1	2	2	7	34
Secondary education	30	17	14	10	13	5	4	3	4	13
Higher education	24	27	3	10	9	13	3	3	6	3
Ethnic Group
Bulgarian	27	25	1	11	12	10	5	4	5	2
Turkish	10	5	77	2	0	1	1	0	5	67
Roma	20	8	41	9	6	4	1	5	7	21
Location
Towns and villages	23	12	38	5	13	1	3	2	3	15
Smaller cities	28	21	8	12	14	6	3	4	4	7
Larger cities	28	26	4	11	10	8	5	4	4	2
Sofia	24	28	1	9	8	17	4	3	6	4

=== By constituency ===
Constituency	GERB–SDS	PP	DPS	Revival	BSPzB	DB	BV	ITN	Others
Blagoevgrad	30.7%	15.7%	18.7%	6.4%	10.7%	3.8%	4.7%	3.2%	6.1%
Burgas	26.5%	18.9%	15.4%	10.0%	8.9%	5.6%	6.0%	3.6%	5.1%
Varna	30.2%	21.5%	5.4%	13.2%	7.5%	7.0%	4.8%	4.1%	6.3%
Veliko Tarnovo	25.1%	18.8%	9.9%	12.0%	13.6%	5.1%	4.3%	4.4%	6.8%
Vidin	28.5%	17.3%	13.6%	8.0%	11.9%	8.1%	3.5%	3.3%	5.8%
Vratsa	32.6%	16.8%	10.7%	9.6%	11.3%	3.5%	4.9%	4.3%	6.3%
Gabrovo	33.3%	20.4%	5.0%	12.6%	10.5%	4.9%	3.7%	4.1%	5.5%
Dobrich	22.2%	19.0%	13.2%	12.3%	14.0%	4.8%	5.0%	3.6%	5.9%
Kardzhali	9.6%	7.4%	71.2%	2.3%	3.5%	1.7%	1.0%	1.3%	2.0%
Kyustendil	34.9%	19.2%	3.2%	9.6%	12.2%	3.6%	6.6%	4.1%	6.5%
Lovech	32.8%	18.6%	9.8%	8.9%	12.5%	4.5%	3.4%	4.1%	5.4%
Montana	25.8%	15.9%	23.9%	8.8%	10.1%	2.9%	3.4%	3.6%	5.6%
Pazardzhik	27.3%	15.9%	19.0%	9.0%	11.1%	3.4%	4.9%	3.3%	6.1%
Pernik	35.8%	19.3%	2.9%	10.8%	9.9%	4.7%	5.7%	4.3%	6.6%
Pleven	23.4%	19.5%	8.3%	10.3%	15.3%	4.6%	5.3%	7.0%	6.3%
Plovdiv-city	26.2%	26.0%	3.0%	11.3%	8.3%	8.9%	6.4%	4.5%	5.4%
Plovdiv-province	29.0%	18.6%	9.0%	10.9%	14.0%	4.2%	5.2%	3.6%	5.5%
Razgrad	19.5%	9.2%	45.5%	4.6%	6.4%	7.1%	2.2%	2.0%	3.5%
Ruse	23.5%	23.2%	8.6%	11.9%	10.8%	5.7%	4.7%	5.0%	6.6%
Silistra	26.4%	14.8%	31.1%	6.8%	8.3%	2.5%	2.8%	2.9%	4.4%
Sliven	33.1%	19.8%	6.1%	10.4%	11.8%	4.5%	4.0%	3.7%	6.6%
Smolyan	26.4%	17.6%	25.4%	5.5%	10.4%	3.4%	3.6%	3.4%	4.3%
Sofia-city 23	21.7%	28.6%	0.7%	9.2%	7.5%	20.4%	4.6%	2.9%	4.4%
Sofia-city 24	24.5%	26.5%	0.7%	10.0%	7.2%	17.3%	5.0%	3.3%	5.5%
Sofia-city 25	28.3%	24.6%	0.8%	11.7%	8.4%	11.3%	4.9%	3.8%	6.2%
Sofia-province	32.2%	16.6%	7.1%	9.8%	10.9%	5.1%	8.1%	3.8%	6.4%
Stara Zagora	26.3%	19.5%	10.1%	12.5%	11.4%	5.0%	4.8%	4.6%	5.8%
Targovishte	17.7%	11.3%	43.5%	6.3%	7.8%	2.9%	4.0%	2.5%	4.0%
Haskovo	26.4%	19.2%	17.7%	9.3%	8.8%	3.9%	6.9%	3.3%	4.5%
Shumen	24.4%	17.2%	26.8%	8.1%	9.6%	3.0%	3.1%	3.0%	4.8%
Yambol	26.8%	20.4%	2.4%	12.6%	18.6%	3.9%	5.5%	4.3%	5.5%
Bulgarian nationals abroad	8.8%	22.8%	31.8%	14.5%	2.1%	10.0%	2.0%	4.7%	3.3%
source: Electoral Commission of Bulgaria

== Aftermath and coalition formation ==
As per the Bulgarian Constitution, the Bulgarian President Rumen Radev is required to hand a mandate for government formation to the largest party. If they don't propose a government within seven days, or if that government is rejected by the Bulgarian Parliament, President Radev will hand the second mandate to the second largest party. If the second mandate also doesn't produce a government, the president will grant a third mandate to a party of his choice. If no government is approved by Parliament after all three mandates have been returned, new elections will be scheduled. Neither GERB nor PP, the first and second largest party respectively, are expected to be able to form a stable government.

Following the election, GERB leader Boyko Borisov, who had served as prime minister for most of the time between 2009 and 2021, announced that he was not interested in a cabinet position or returning to the post of prime minister, stating that "now is not the right time for dominance, but for seeking unity." Borisov's previous government had been the subject of the 2020–2021 Bulgarian protests over corruption allegations, the effects of which had been felt through all of the legislative snap elections held since that point. He stated that GERB was open to coalition talks with any party or coalition in the legislature, even ones that had generally opposed him and GERB, and sought party experts to seek common ground on main issues, including the ongoing Russian invasion of Ukraine, the 2021–2022 inflation surge, joining the eurozone, and becoming part of the Schengen Area.

The National Assembly remained fragmented, and no party was able to form a governing coalition. GERB and the Movement for Rights and Freedoms (DPS) did not have a majority, holding only 103 of the 121 seats needed. Bulgarian Rise (BV) and Revival, which held a combined 39 seats, are considered Eurosceptic and sympathetic to Russia, similarly to the Bulgarian Socialist Party (BSP) with 25 seats. Although generally pro-EU, the remaining parties and alliances with seats opposed Boyko Borisov's past government and refused any possibility of a coalition with GERB due to disagreements over corruption.

On 18 October, Borisov announced that his attempts to broker a coalition government prior to the first sitting of the new Assembly were unsuccessful. The following day, the Assembly failed to elect a speaker during its first meeting, the first time this ever occurred. After multiple failed attempts, the Assembly elected its oldest member, the GERB MP Vezhdi Rashidov, as speaker on 21 October, after he was nominated by Korneliya Ninova, the leader of BSP, as a consensus candidate. The gridlock to form a new government persisted throughout October and November 2022 and before a first or second mandate was given, President Rumen Radev stated that he would delay handing over the third mandate for government formation until after the New Year so as to delay elections until March 2023 and avoid the most difficult winter period.

On 2 December, Radev stated that he would hand the government mandate to the election's winner GERB the following Monday. On 5 December, Radev granted the first mandate to GERB's nominee, Nikolay Gabrovski. One week later, on 12 December, Gabrovski proposed a new government. His prime ministership was rejected by Parliament (113 for, 125 against, 2 absent) two days later on 14 December, with MPs from the DPS and BV voting in favour alongside GERB. On January 3, Radev gave the second mandate to PP's candidate, Nikolai Denkov, but his prime ministership was also rejected by Parliament (63 for, 84 against, 30 abstain, 63 absent). Radev gave the third mandate to Ninova, although she rejected to form a government in a deadlocked parliament. Observers already pointed at an unprecedented fourth snap election to be held in 2023, as no new government could be formed.
