= Bulgarian Rise =

Political party in Bulgaria

Bulgarian Rise Български възход
- Abbreviation: BV
- Leader: Stefan Yanev
- Founded: 5 May 2022
- Ideology: National conservatism; Bulgarian nationalism; Conservatism; Souverainism
- Political position: Right-wing
- Colours: Green, Blue, Red
- National Assembly: 0 / 240

Website
- www.bgvazhod.com

Bulgarian Rise (Bulgarian: Български възход, romanized: Balgarski vazhod; BV) is a national conservative political party in Bulgaria. It was founded on 5 May 2022 by Stefan Yanev, the former caretaker Prime Minister and Defence Minister.

== Political positions ==
Some describe the party as both pro-Putin and pro-Russia. Future party leader Yanev was removed from the Petkov Government in March 2022 after he refused to describe the Russian invasion of Ukraine as a war. He launched the party two months later. Despite this, the party backed sending military aid to Ukraine, with the condition that Bulgaria receive modern NATO weaponry in exchange. He also called the invasion an act of aggression and stated his support for the sanctions against Russia.

There is little consensus over the party's stances on economic matters. They have been labelled as centre-left, though Yanev himself has said the party is not on the right nor the left.

The party has garnered some criticism for not expressing substantive positions on most political issues.

== Structure ==
The party has one leader, Stefan Yanev. To take part in the 2022 parliamentary snap elections, it allied with four smaller "mandate carrier" parties, Svoboda, Party of the Greens, the Alternative for Bulgarian Revival, the Agrarian People's Union and Union of Free Democrats.

=== 2022 composition ===
Party	Abbr.	Leader	Ideology	2022 result
Bulgarian Rise	BV	Stefan Yanev	National conservatism	115,872 votes (4.5%); 12 seats
Svoboda	SVOBODA	Vladimir Simeonov	Nationalism	115,872 votes (4.5%); 12 seats
Party of the Greens (Note: The Party of the Greens joined the electoral coalition Together to contest the 2023 election)	PV	Valentin Simov	Green politics	115,872 votes (4.5%); 12 seats
Alternative for Bulgarian Revival	ABV	Rumen Petkov	Social democracy	115,872 votes (4.5%); 12 seats
Agrarian People's Union	ZNS	Rumen Yonchev	Agrarianism	115,872 votes (4.5%); 12 seats
Union of Free Democrats	SSD	Milan Milanov	Conservatism	115,872 votes (4.5%); 12 seats

In February 2023, Yanev announced that the party would contest the upcoming elections individually, although members of their previous electoral coalition could participate as part of the 'civic quota' or as list members.

=== Relations with BSP ===
Following the 2023 local elections, the Socialist Party (BSP) started to meet with like-minded parties to form a 'patriotic centre-left front'. As a part of this, the party claimed it had met with representatives of BV, but Yanev denied this. BSP also met with parties which ran with BV in the 2022 election.

== Election results ==
=== National Assembly ===
Election	Leader	Votes	%	Seats	+/–	Government
2022	Stefan Yanev	115,872	4.47 (#7)	12 / 240	New	Snap election
2023	Stefan Yanev	77,420	2.93 (#7)	0 / 240	▼12	Extra-parliamentary
Jun 2024	Stefan Yanev	12,322	0.56 (#14)	0 / 240	0	Extra-parliamentary
Oct 2024	Stefan Yanev	10,318	0.41 (#11)	0 / 240	0	Extra-parliamentary

=== European Parliament ===
Election	List leader	Votes	%	Seats	+/–	EP Group
2024	Daniela Vezieva	9,510	0.47 (#15)	0 / 17	New	–
