= Yane Yanev =

Bulgarian politician

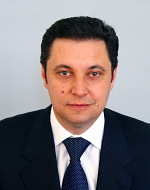
- Born: 22 April 1971 (age 55); Sandanski, Bulgaria
- Occupation: Politician

Yane Yanev (Bulgarian: Яне Янев, born 22 April 1971) is a Bulgarian politician, leader of the center-right opposition party Order, Law and Justice (abbreviated as RZS) and a member of the Bulgarian National Assembly. Known as an "anti-corruption hawk" that has brought to light many political scandals, Yanev is one of the most famous political players to emerge in Bulgaria in the past decade. His stated political mission is the adoption of a new constitution, to replace the one adopted in the early 1990s with the fall of the former communist regime. Yanev has stated that he believes only such a "far-reaching and radical change" will allow Bulgaria to end the period of transition from communism to a law-abiding, democratic society. Following repeated threats concerning his life and health a Bulgarian-Israeli team has assumed 24-hour security of the leader of RZS Yane Yanev, the press center of the party declared.

== Early life ==
Yanev was born in Sandanski, a town in southwestern Bulgaria known for its agreeable climate and recreational resorts. He is son to Georgi Yanev and grandson to Yane Yanev (in whose honor he was named), both known as resistance figures to the communist regime. His grandfather served as mayor of the village Malak Tzalin for 11 years. Yanev attended the local school in Sandanski and in 1990 entered the Agricultural University of Plovdiv, from which he matriculated with a degree in Agro-Engineering in 1994. He also pursued a master's degree in Economics and Management from the University of Plovdiv in 1992 to 1995. During his student days he was active in student politics and was a member of the Students National Organization (Independent).

== Political involvement ==
Coming from a family long involved in agrarian politics, in his third year of university Yanev became a member of the National Alliance – Bulgarian Agricultural People's Union, and the chairman of its advisory board to the parliamentary group. He rose to prominence within the party and by the time Ivan Kostov became prime minister in 1997, he was a sought-after figure. After declining offers of positions in government, Yanev found himself in a hostile political environment that forced his resignation from politics. He then worked as Chairman of the Board of Directors for the canned food and beverage company Kustendilski Plod. In 2000 he returned to political involvement through the Agricultural People's Union and became the party chairman. He rose to national prominence in the early years of the decade by exposing to the public the fact the former King had abused his powers as Prime Minister (2001–2005) by privatizing state property that was formerly used by his family before the overthrow of the monarchy in 1946. Yanev also investigated abuses under the King's Minister of Finance Milen Velchev. Yanev oversaw the transformation of the party in 2005 to Order, Law and Justice, maintaining the position of Secretary General in charge of overall organization, whilst the titular chairman position was given to former constitutional judge Georgi Markov. Following a failure to make significant electoral gains in the 2006 presidential elections, Markov resigned his position and Yanev unified the two posts under himself as chairman.

== Member of Parliament ==
In June 2005 Yanev was elected as a member of the 40th National Assembly from the region of Blagoevgrad as part of the Union of Democratic Forces, and was a member of the committees on Agriculture and Forests, and Environment and Water. In July 2009 Yanev retained his position in the 41st National Assembly. He is currently Chairman of the Bulgaria-Israel Friendship Committee. From July to December 2009, he also served as Chairperson of the Anti-Corruption, Conflict of Interests and Parliamentary Ethics Committee, a member of the Control Committee of the State Agency for National Security, and a member of the Advisory Board on National Security to the President of the Republic.

== Personal life ==
Yanev announced his plans to be married by the end of 2010 during a live television interview on the popular talk show "Ivan & Andrei".
