= Todor Boyadzhiev =

Bulgarian engineer and politician (1939–2022)

Member of the National Assembly of Bulgaria
- In office 5 July 2001 – 17 June 2005

Member of the Grand National Assembly of Bulgaria
- In office 10 July 1990 – 2 October 1991

Personal details
- Born: Todor Kostov Boyadzhiev; 10 October 1939 Karnobat, Bulgaria
- Died: 25 November 2022 (aged 83) Gramatikovo, Bulgaria
- Party: BCP
- Education: Technical University, Sofia
- Occupation: Engineer

Todor Kostov Boyadzhiev (Bulgarian: Тодор Костов Бояджиев; 10 October 1939 – 25 November 2022) was a Bulgarian engineer and politician. A member of the Communist Party, he served in the National Assembly from 2001 to 2005.

Boyadzhiev died in Gramatikovo on 25 November 2022, at the age of 83.
