= Union of Free Democrats =

Union of Free Democrats Съюз на свободните демократи
- Leader: Radoslav Katsarov
- Founder: Stefan Sofiyanski
- Founded: December 9, 2001
- Split from: Union of Democratic Forces
- Headquarters: Sofia
- Ideology: Conservatism
- Political position: Centre-right to right-wing
- National affiliation: United Democratic Forces (2001); Bulgarian People's Union (2005); Bulgarian Rise (2022); Free Voters(2024)
- Colours: Blue
- National Assembly: 0 / 240
- European Parliament: 0 / 17

Website
- ssd.bg

The Union of Free Democrats (Bulgarian: Съюз на свободните демократи, Sajuz na svobodnite demokrati) is a conservative political party in Bulgaria, led by Stefan Sofiyanski. It contested the 2001 elections as part of the United Democratic Forces electoral alliance, which picked up 51 of 240 seats. It joined the Bulgarian People's Union, which won 5.7% of the popular vote and 13 out of 240 seats at the 2005 Bulgarian parliamentary election.

== Election results ==
=== National Assembly ===
Election	Leader	Votes	%	Seats	+/–	Government
2005 (Note: Run as part of the United Democratic Forces coalition.)	Stefan Sofiyanski	830,338	18.18 (#2)	0 / 240	New	Extra-parliamentary
2005 (Note: Run as part of the Bulgarian People's Union coalition.)	Stefan Sofiyanski	189,268	5.19 (#7)	0 / 240	0	Extra-parliamentary
2009	Did not contest			0 / 240	0	Extra-parliamentary
2013	Did not contest			0 / 240	0	Extra-parliamentary
2014	Did not contest			0 / 240	0	Extra-parliamentary
2017	Did not contest			0 / 240	0	Extra-parliamentary
Apr 2021	Did not contest			0 / 240	0	Extra-parliamentary
Jul 2021	Did not contest			0 / 240	0	Extra-parliamentary
Nov 2021 (Note: Run as part of the We Continue the Change coalition.)	Milan Milanov	673,170	25.32 (#1)	0 / 240	0	Extra-parliamentary
2022 (Note: Run as part of the Bulgarian Rise coalition.)	Radoslav Katsarov	115,872	4.47 (#7)	0 / 240	0	Extra-parliamentary
2023	Did not contest			0 / 240	0	Extra-parliamentary
Jun 2024	Did not contest			0 / 240	0	Extra-parliamentary
Oct 2024 (Note: Run as part of the Free Voters coalition (ZS, RzB and SSD).)	Radoslav Katsarov	6,293	0.25 (#15)	0 / 240	0	Extra-parliamentary
