= National Movement for Rights and Freedoms =

Bulgarian political party

National Movement for Rights and Freedoms Национално движение за права и свободи
- Abbreviation: NDPS
- Leader: Guner Tahir
- Founded: 12 December 1999
- Split from: Movement for Rights and Freedoms
- Colors: Blue
- National Assembly: 0 / 240

Website
- http://ndps-bg.com/

The National Movement for Rights and Freedoms (Bulgarian: Национално движение за права и свободи, NDPS) is a political party in Bulgaria led by Guner Tahir. Tahir was the deputy chairman of the Movement for Rights and Freedoms from 1994 to 1997.

== Electoral history ==
The party was part of the Rose Coalition alongside the EuroLeft party for the 2005 parliamentary election.

It also took part in the 2017 election in the 'Association DOST' coalition, with the Democrats for Responsibility, Solidarity and Tolerance.

The party registered and attempted to take part in the October 2024 election, however their registration was blocked by the electoral commission.
