= Ilko Dimitrov =

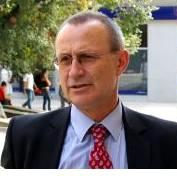
- Born: 23 December 1955 (age 70); Sofia, Bulgaria
- Occupation: poet

Ilko Dimitrov Dimitrov (Bulgarian: Илко Димитров Димитров) is a Bulgarian jurist and poet, born on 23 December 1955 in Sofia, Bulgaria. He served as deputy defense minister of the Republic of Bulgaria (2003–2005). Member of the 40th National Assembly of Bulgaria. Member of the Bulgarian Writers Association.

== Literary works ==
- Opit za opredelenie (Attempt at a Definition), poetry, 1989
- Prikazki za Popo (Tales of Poppo), a book for children, 1992
- Obraten vodopad (Reverse Waterfall), poetry, 1995
- Vselena po zdrach (Universe at Dusk), poetry, 1998
- Parkat (The Park), a poem, 1999 - Annual award of the Bulgarian Writers Association, 1999
- Trite koshnitsi (The Three Baskets), poetry, 2000
- Razchlenyavane (Dismemberment), a poem, 2001
- Dvamata sadruzhnitsi (The Two Associates), essays, 2007
- Byalo (White), selected poetry, 2008
- Prodavachat na kontsi (The Thread Seller), a poem, 2009 - "Ivan Nikolov" National Poetry Award for 2009.
- Bog v Nyu York (God in New York), prose, 2010
- 4etiri (Four), poetry, 2011
- tova edno/ mozhesh li go (This Oneness), poetry, 2013

In translation:

- in Serbian - Molitva za novu zemqu, a poem, Gradina (Niš), N 12, 1997, tr. by Velimir Kostov and Mila Vasov;
- in English - Untitled miniatures, Nthposition (UK webzine), November 2003, tr. by Zdravka Evtimova;
- in English - Untitled miniatures, The MAG - The Muse Apprentice Guild (USA webzine), Fall 2003, tr. by Zdravka Evtimova;
- in English - The Thread Seller, a poem, The Literary Club (BG webzine), 2009, tr. by Hristianna
