= Stanislav Stanilov =

Bulgarian politician and historian

Stanislav Todorov Stanilov

Personal details
- Born: 9 September 1943 (age 82) Gabrovo, Bulgaria
- Profession: Politician, Historian, Archaeologist

Stanislav Stanilov (Bulgarian: Станислав Станилов), (born 9 September 1943, in Gabrovo) is a Bulgarian archaeologist, historian and politician. Stanilov has been a member of the Attack since its founding in 2005 and became vice-chairman of its parliamentary group on 13 November 2007, a position which he still retains. In addition to his native Bulgarian, Stanilov is fluent in Russian and German.
