= Aliosman Imamov =

Bulgarian politician (1953–2025)

- Алиосман Имамов
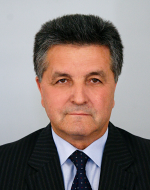
- Imamov in 2009

Member of the National Assembly of Bulgaria for the 1st MMC – Blagoevgrad
- In office 5 June 2001 – 26 January 2017

Personal details
- Born: Aliosman Ibraim Imamov; 20 March 1953; Ablanitsa, Bulgaria
- Died: 11 June 2025 (aged 72)
- Political party: DPS
- Education: University of National and World Economy
- Occupation: Academic

Aliosman Ibraim Imamov (Bulgarian: Алиосман Ибраим Имамов; 20 March 1953 – 11 June 2025) was a Bulgarian politician who was a member of the Movement for Rights and Freedoms, he served in the National Assembly from 2001 to 2017.

Imamov died on 11 June 2025, at the age of 72.
