= Hristina Hristova =

Bulgarian politician

- Христина Христова
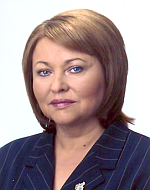
- Hristova in 2005

Member of the European Parliament for Bulgaria
- In office 2007
- Other name: Christina Christova

Personal details
- Born: Hristina Hristova Velcheva; 21 January 1954 (age 72) Popitsa, People's Republic of Bulgaria
- Party: National Movement Simeon II; Alliance of Liberals and Democrats for Europe

Hristina Hristova Velcheva (Bulgarian: Христина Христова Велчева) (born 21 January 1954 in Popitza, Vratsa Oblast) is a Bulgarian politician and former Member of the European Parliament (MEP). She is a member of the National Movement Simeon II, part of the Alliance of Liberals and Democrats for Europe, and became an MEP on 1 February 2007 with the accession of Bulgaria to the European Union.
