= Kristian Vigenin =

Bulgarian politician

- Кристиан Вигенин
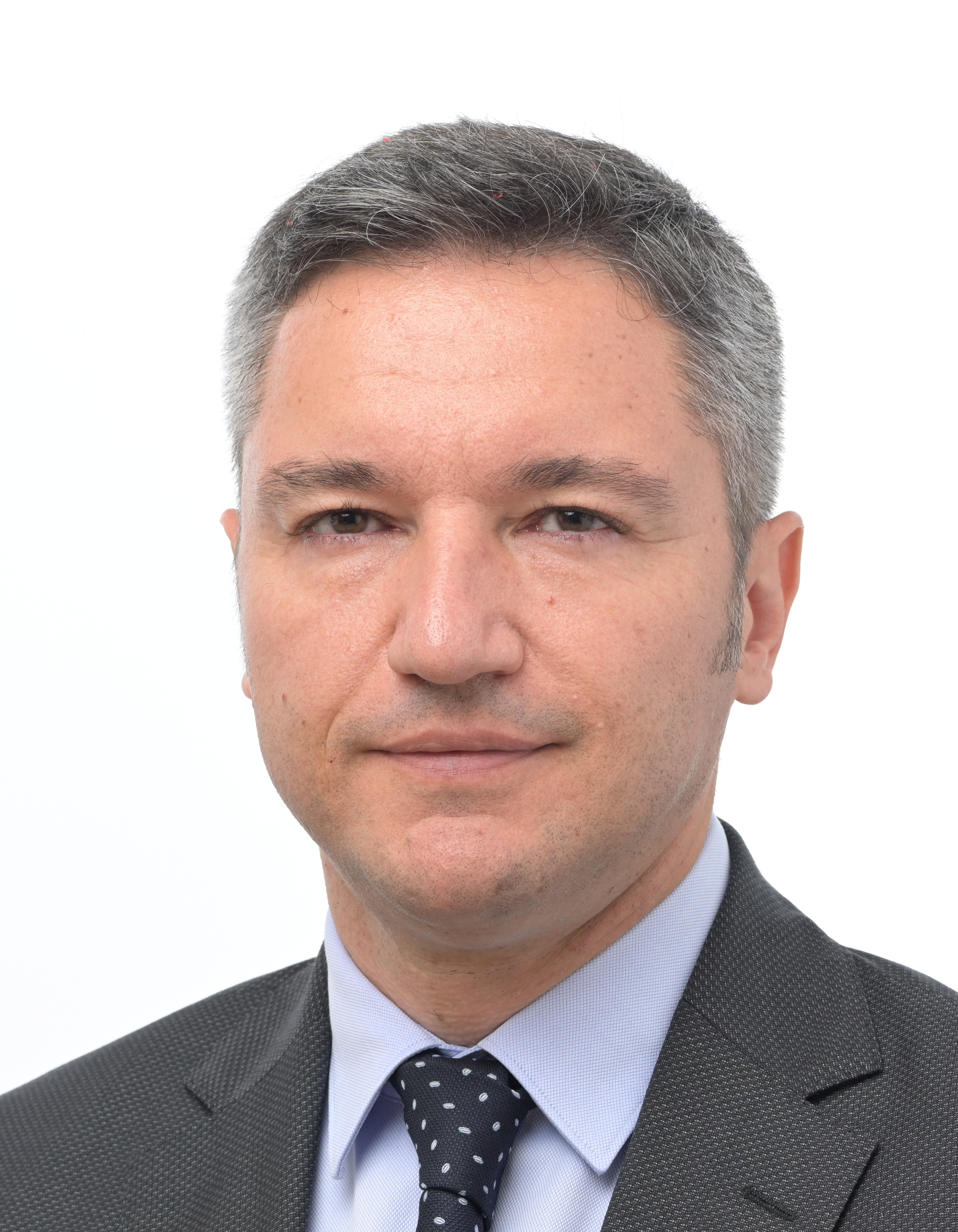
- Official portrait, 2024

Member of the European Parliament for Bulgaria
- Incumbent
- Assumed office 16 July 2024
- Preceded by: Sergey Stanishev
- In office 1 January 2007 – 28 May 2013
- Preceded by: Position established
- Succeeded by: Marusya Lyubcheva

Member of the National Assembly
- In office 27 October 2014 – 19 June 2024
- Constituency: 1st MMC - Blagoevgrad (2014-2017); 31st MMC - Yambol (2017-2024)

Minister of Foreign Affairs
- In office 29 May 2013 – 6 August 2014
- Prime Minister: Plamen Oresharski
- Preceded by: Nickolay Mladenov
- Succeeded by: Daniel Mitov

Personal details
- Born: Kristian Ivanov Vigenin; 12 June 1975 (age 51) Sofia, PR Bulgaria
- Party: BSP
- Other political affiliations: Party of European Socialists
- Education: University of National and World Economy
- Occupation: Politician; diplomat; economist

Kristian Ivanov Vigenin (Bulgarian: Кристиан Иванов Вигенин; born 12 June 1975) is a Bulgarian politician, Vice-President of the National Assembly of Bulgaria, former Minister of Foreign Affairs of Bulgaria, and a Member of the European Parliament.

He became minister on May 29, 2013, in the cabinet of Plamen Oresharski, where he served until the new government took office on August 6, 2014.

In the European Parliament, Mr. Vigenin was a member of the Coalition for Bulgaria, part of the Party of European Socialists, and became an MEP on 1 January 2007 with the accession of Bulgaria to the European Union.

== Early life and education ==
Born in Sofia, Vigenin received a bachelor's degree in International Economics and Macroeconomics at the University of National and World Economy in 1998. He is fluent in English, French, German, Russian and his native Bulgarian.

== Political career ==
=== Early political career ===
Vigenin's political career began in 1994 while still a student in his alma mater. During that time, he became a founder of the Bulgarian Socialist Youth and served three consecutive terms in office, until 2000. From March 1999 to March 2001 Vigenin served as senior expert on the European Union Integration Directorate of the Bulgarian Customs Agency. In 2000 Kristian Vigenin was elected to the Supreme Council of the Bulgarian Socialist Party and in the end of 2001 became a member of the Executive Bureau of the Party. Since 2003, he was a full member of the Socialist International and a member of the Party of European Socialists, since 2005. Following his membership in BSP, Vigenin was elected as Member of Parliament from Yambol and the same year became a member of the European Parliament. After May 2007, Vigenin was elected as MEP and was a winner of his re-election in 2009.

=== Ukraine ===
On November 9, 2013, Vigenin traveled to Odesa, Ukraine where he met with Minister of Foreign Affairs Leonid Kozhara and Prime Minister of Ukraine Mykola Azarov. In December of the same year, Vigenin again visited Ukraine. That month he spoke at the Ukrainian capital Kyiv on OSCE, the Helsinki Accords and Helsinki+40 Process which was discussed in Dublin in 2012.

=== European Union ===
On July 3, 2014, Kristian Vigenin met with Ivica Dačić, the Serbian Minister of Foreign Affairs. The two discussed a plan on how to build the South Stream gas pipeline, a plan which was later called off due to the Russian actions in Eastern Ukraine.

The same year, he met with the Romanian Foreign Affairs Minister Titus Corlățean and discussed the possible integration of Republics of Moldova and Georgia into the European Union, the EU Association Agreement and the Deep and Comprehensive Free Trade Agreement. Prior to the 2014 meeting, they discussed the same issues in August 2013 at the Foreign Affairs Council, during which, besides those issues, the two also discussed Middle East and North Africa, with special focus on Egypt and Syria.

== See also ==
- List of foreign ministers in 2014
- Foreign relations of Bulgaria
- List of Bulgarians

Political offices
| Preceded by Marin Raykov | 63rd Minister of Foreign Affairs; 29 May 2013 – 6 August 2014 | Succeeded by Daniel Mitov |
