= Andrey Pantev =

Bulgarian historian (born 1939)

Andrey Pantev (Bulgarian: Андрей Пантев; born March 26, 1939 in Rakovitsa, Vidin Province) is a Bulgarian historian, a member-academician of the World Academy of Sciences and the Bulgarian Academy of Sciences.

After graduating as a historian, he specialized in a number of research centers in Great Britain since 1969 and in the United States since 1979. He also participated in politics after the Revolutions of 1989. He is a specialist in the history of Great Britain and the USA.

== Bibliography ==
- Англия срещу Русия на Балканите: 1879–1894 (England versus Russia in the Balkans: 1879–1894), 1972
- Българския въпрос във Великобритания 1876 (The Bulgarian Question in Great Britain 1876), 1981
- Историческа българистика в Англия и САЩ 1856–1919 (Historical Bulgarian Studies in England and the United States 1856–1919), 1986
- Революция и реформи в Западна Европа и Северна Америка, XVII–XVIII в., 1988
- Христофор Колумб и новият свят, за деца, 1989
- Защо две Америки, 1991
- История на България. Т. 7, 1991, съавт.
- Години на демокрация?, 1992
- История на България, 1993, съавт.
- Раждането на модерната демокрация, 1993
- US Project for Determining the Borders of Bulgaria: 1918–1919, USA, 1993
- САЩ и българския териториален въпрос 1919, на английски, Ню Лексингтън, Охайо, 1993
- История на новото време, 1994, съавт.
- Проблеми на новата и най-новата стопанска история, 1994, съавт.
- Стефан Стамболов – хъшът държавник, или 'Българският Бисмарк' , 1994
- Хронологична енциклопедия на света, т. V, 1995, съавт.
- За Стамболов в часа на България, 1995
- Cultural and Intercultural Traditional Perspectives in Europe, Strasburg, 1995
- Българският април 1876 в Англия и САЩ, 1996
- Историческата еволюция и политическа демокрация, 1997
- Другата версия, 1998 (The Other Version)
- 100 най-известни българи в нашата история, 1997, ed. (100 most famous Bulgarians in our history)
- Гладстон и българите, 1999, ed. (Gladstone and the Bulgarians)
- Светът след Иисус, 1999, ed. (The World Since Jesus)
- Стоте най-влиятелни българи в нашата история, 1999 (The Hundred Most Influential Bulgarians in Our History)
- Исторически многоточия, 1999 (Historical notes)
- Българската история в европейския контекст, 2000 (Bulgarian History in the European Context)
- Сир, това е революция, 2001 ("Sir, this is a revolution")
- Исторически въпросителни изд, RIVA, Sofia, 2003
- Носът на Клеопатра изд, RIVA, Sofia, 2004
