= Nikolai Kamov (politician) =

Bulgarian politician

- Born: Nikolai Kamov
- Known for: Bulgarian politician, Bilderberg participant

Nikolai Kamov is a Bulgarian politician. Kamov was a Member of Parliament as well as a delegate to the NATO Parliamentary Assembly.
