= Ramadan Atalay =

Bulgarian politician (born 1960)

- Рамадан Аталай
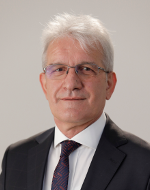
- Official portrait, 2021

Member of the National Assembly
- In office 19 April 1997 – 24 April 2026

Personal details
- Born: Ramadan Bayram Atalay; 12 April 1957 (age 69) Mudrevo, Razgrad Province, PR Bulgaria
- Party: APS (2024-present); DPS (1997-2024)

Ramadan Bayram Atalay (Bulgarian: Рамадан Байрам Аталай; born 12 April 1957) is a Turkish Bulgarian politician and former member of the National Assembly of Bulgaria. Between 1982 and 1990 he was an agent of the State Security. In 2024 Standart reported that his residence in Sofia was valued at nearly 7.5 million euro. A long-term member of the DPS, he was the longest serving MP in Bulgaria's post-communist history, having been an MP continuously since 1997 In 2024 he joined the APS faction of the party. He was not reelected in the 2026 election. He had been a member of 14 consecutive Parliaments
