= Mario Tagarinski =

Bulgarian politician and engineer

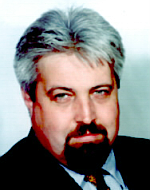
- Mario Ivanov Tagarinski

Personal details
- Born: 4 August 1958 (age 67) Yambol, Bulgaria
- Profession: Politician, Engineer

Mario Ivanov Tagarinski (Bulgarian: Марио Иванов Тагарински) (born 4 August 1958) is a Bulgarian politician and engineer who served as Minister of Public Administration in the Kostov government between 1997 and 1999.

== Life ==
Tagarinski was born in Yambol and graduated from the Technical University in Sofia with a degree in electrical engineering. Between 1976 and 1982, he was employed in the Kremikovtzi company.

Tagarinski has been a member of five National Parliaments between 1994 and 2013. He has for a long time been affiliated with the UDF. Tagarinski became a deputy in the 41st National Assembly on the ticket of the Order, Law and Justice (Bulgarian: Ред, законност и справедливост; Red, zakonnost i spravedlivost) in 2009, but left the party's parliamentary group in December 2009, causing its collapse, as it could no longer meet the 10 member requirement. He has also been associated with the New Social Democracy party (Bulgarian: Нова социалдемократическа партия).

Tagarinski is married and has two children. In addition to his native Bulgarian, he also speaks Russian and English.
