= Agrarian People's Union =

Agrarian People's Union Земеделски народен съюз
- Abbreviation: ZNS
- Leader: Roumen Yonchev
- Founded: 1996 (BZNS-NS); 18 May 2006 (ZNS)
- Split from: Bulgarian Agrarian People's Union
- Headquarters: Sofia
- Ideology: Agrarianism; Conservatism
- Political position: Centre-right
- National affiliation: United Democratic Forces (1997–2001); Bulgarian People's Union (2005–2006); Bulgaria Without Censorship (2014); Stand Up.BG! We are coming! (2021); Bulgarian Rise (2022); Blue Bulgaria (2024); Alliance for Rights and Freedoms (2024–)
- Colours: Orange
- National Assembly: 0 / 240
- European Parliament: 0 / 17

Website
- zns.bg

The Agrarian People's Union (Bulgarian: Земеделски народен съюз, romanized: Zemedelski naroden sajuz; ZNS), until 2006 known as the Bulgarian Agrarian People's Union – People's Union (Balgarski Zemedelski Naroden Sajuz – Naroden Sajuz, BZNS-NS), is a conservative agrarian party in Bulgaria.

It was founded in 1996 by a faction of the Bulgarian Agrarian People's Union led by Anastasia Dimitrova-Moser. It contested the parliamentary election in 1997 and 2001 within the center-right United Democratic Forces. In 2005 it was part of the Bulgarian People's Union, that won at the legislative election on 25 June 2005 with 5.7% of the popular vote and 13 out of 240 seats.

A considerable group around the former party leader Anastasia Dimitrova-Moser left the ZNS in 2008 and founded the United Agrarians.

The party is a former observer of the Centrist Democrat International (CDI).

== Election results ==
=== National Assembly ===
Election	Leader	Votes	%	Seats	+/–	Government
Apr 2021 (Note: Run as part of the Stand Up! Mafia, Get Out! coalition.)	Rumen Yonchev	150,940	4.65 (#6)	2 / 240	New	Snap election
Jul 2021	Rumen Yonchev	136,885	4.95 (#6)	1 / 240	▼1	Snap election
Nov 2021 (Note: Run as part of the Stand Up.BG! We are coming! coalition.)	Rumen Yonchev	60,055	2.26 (#8)	0 / 240	▼1	Extra-parliamentary
2022 (Note: Run as part of the Bulgarian Rise coalition.)	Rumen Yonchev	115,872	4.47 (#7)	0 / 240	0	Extra-parliamentary
2023	Did not contest			0 / 240	0	Extra-parliamentary
Jun 2024 (Note: Run as part of the Blue Bulgaria coalition.)	Rumen Yonchev	33,613	1.52 (#9)	0 / 240	0	Extra-parliamentary
Oct 2024 (Note: Run as part of the Alliance for Rights and Freedoms coalition.)	Rumen Yonchev	182,253	7.23 (#6)	1 / 240	▲1	Opposition
2026	Rumen Yonchev	50,759	1.54 (#10)	0 / 240	▼1	Extra-parliamentary

=== European Parliament ===
Election	List leader	Votes	%	Seats	+/–	EP Group
2009	Unclear	57,931	2.25 (#10)	0 / 17	New	–
2014	Did not contest			0 / 17	0	–
2019	Did not contest			0 / 17	0	–
2024 (Note: Run as part of the Blue Bulgaria coalition.)	Tsveta Kirilova	24,917	1.24 (#10)	0 / 17	0	–
