= Rumen Ovtcharov =

Bulgarian politician, engineer, physicist and economist

Rumen Stoyanov Ovcharov
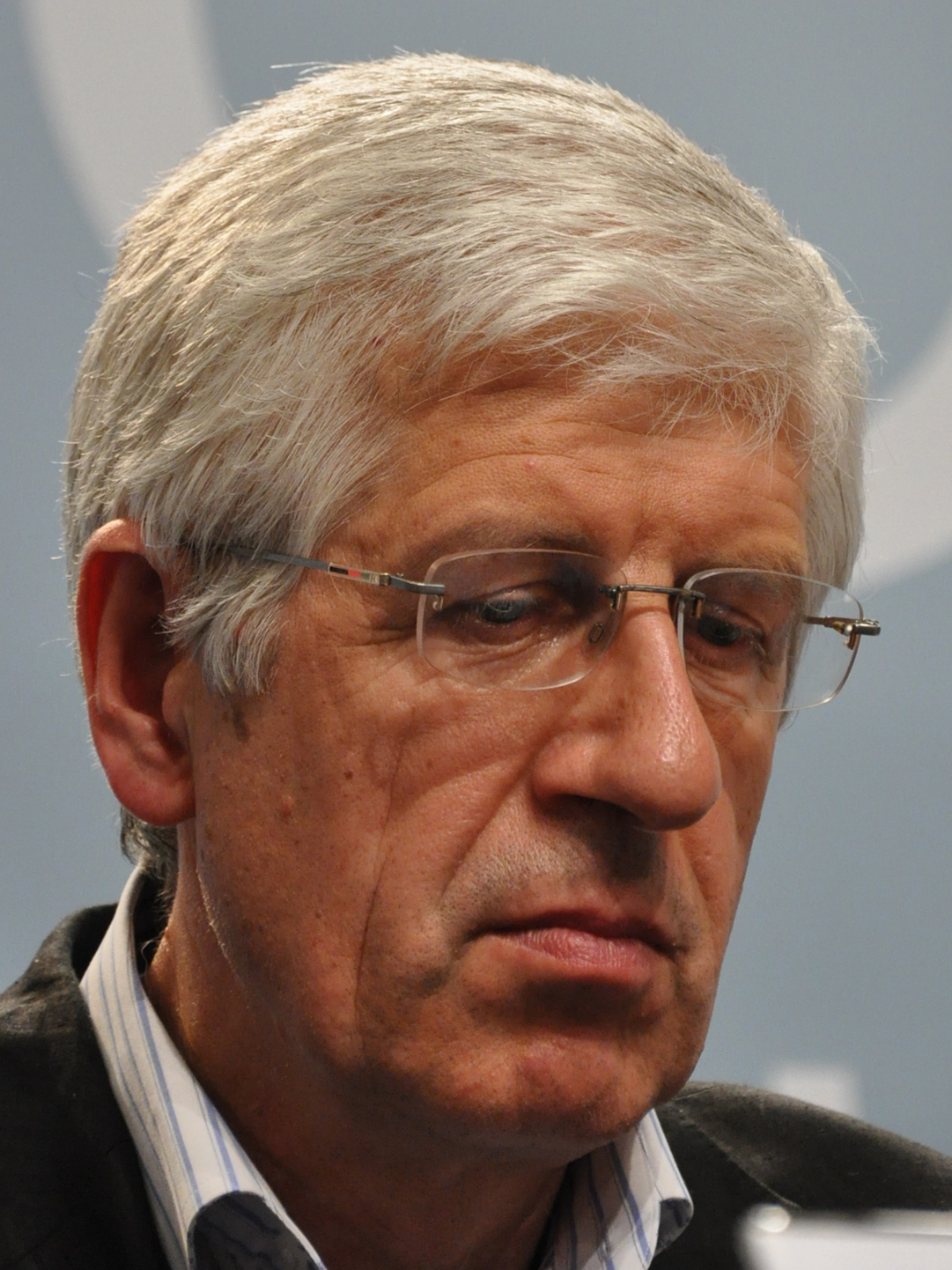
- Ovcharov in 2009

Personal details
- Born: 5 July 1952 (age 74) Burgas, Bulgaria
- Education: University of National and World Economy
- Profession: Engineer, Physicist, Economist, Politician

Rumen Stoyanov Ovtcharov (Bulgarian: Румен Стоянов Овчаров) (born 5 July 1952) is a Bulgarian politician, engineer, physicist, and economist. He was a member of the National Parliament on four occasions and was the Minister of the Economy and Energy between 17 August 2005 and 18 July 2007.

== Biography ==
Ovtcharov served as the Minister of Energy and Energy Resources in the Zhan Videnov government between June 1996 and February 1997.

Ovtcharov is married to Ivanka and they have three children - Yana, Theodora and Slav. In addition to his native Bulgarian, he is fluent in Russian and English.

As of February 12, 2021 Rumen Ovcharov is under court proceedings for the ownerless and a loss of government finances of 500 million leva in connection with the Belene nuclear power plant.

== U.S. Treasury sanctions ==
The Office of Foreign Assets Control of the United States Department of the Treasury has placed Ovcharov under sanctions pursuant to the Global Magnistsky Act for alleged participation in "corrupt energy contracts with Russian energy companies, receiving bribes and other kickbacks in exchange for fixed-price contracts for Russian gas and nuclear fuel and support contracts at [Kozloduy Nuclear Power Plant]. Ovcharov has received more than five million euros in offshore bank accounts since serving as Minister of Energy."

== Bibliography ==
- Lilov, Grigor (2013). Най-богатите българи (1st ed.). Sofia: „Кайлас” ЕООД. ISBN 978-954-92098-9-1.
