= 2005 Bulgarian parliamentary election =

- 25 June 2005
- All 240 seats in the 40th National Assembly; 121 seats needed for a majority
- Turnout: 55.76% (▼10.87pp)
Party	Leader	Vote %	Seats	+/–
KB	Sergei Stanishev	30.95	82	+34
NDSV	Simeon Sakskoburggotski	19.88	53	−67
DPS	Ahmed Dogan	12.81	34	+13
Ataka	Volen Siderov	8.14	21	New
ODS	Nadezhda Mihaylova	7.68	20	−31
DSB	Ivan Kostov	6.44	17	New
BNS	Anastasia Mozer	5.19	13	+13
This lists parties that won seats. See the complete results below.
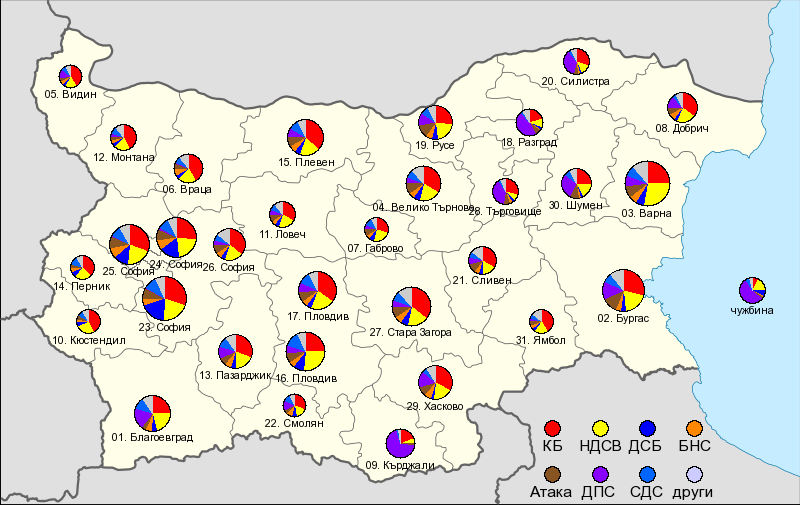

Prime Minister before	Prime Minister after
Simeon Sakskoburggotski; NDSV (Sakskoburggotski Government)	Sergei Stanishev; BSP (Stanishev Government)

Parliamentary elections were held in Bulgaria on 25 June 2005, for the 240 members of the National Assembly. According to exit polls, the Bulgarian Socialist Party (BSP) had a lead with around 31%, but without a majority, necessitating the creation of a coalition. The National Movement for Simeon II, in power before the election, was in second place, with around 21%. Following the election, the BSP leader Sergei Stanishev became prime minister. At least 6,000 candidates from 22 parties ran for election to the 240-member parliament. The turnout of 56% was the lowest on record. 4% of the votes are needed to gain a seat.

The opposition led the election, but did not gain an outright majority. Stanishev stated he would attempt to form a governing coalition. Stanishev said in a press conference, "We won the confidence of the people ... We are ready to form a government ... and we will negotiate with any democratic party." In the previous five elections held since 1989, no government was re-elected—each had to implement stringent economic and social reforms since the Fall of Communism and lost popular support as a result.

== Results ==
Graph of the party split among 240 seats.
Party	Votes	%	Seats	+/–
Coalition for Bulgaria	1,129,196	30.95	82	+34
National Movement Simeon II	725,314	19.88	53	−67
Movement for Rights and Freedoms	467,400	12.81	34	+13
National Union Attack	296,848	8.14	21	New
United Democratic Forces	280,323	7.68	20	−31
Democrats for a Strong Bulgaria	234,788	6.44	17	New
Bulgarian People's Union	189,268	5.19	13	+13
New Era	107,758	2.95	0	New
Rose Coalition (BSD–NDPS–OBT)	47,410	1.30	0	0
Euroroma	45,637	1.25	0	New
Bulgarian Christian Coalition	21,064	0.58	0	New
FAGO	18,326	0.50	0	New
United Party of Pensioners in Bulgaria	12,760	0.35	0	New
Long Live Bulgaria!	12,622	0.35	0	New
Federation of Free Business–Union Bulgaria	12,196	0.33	0	New
Forward Bulgaria	10,275	0.28	0	New
Dignified Bulgaria Coalition	8,420	0.23	0	New
SDN Granite	5,923	0.16	0	New
Chamber of Experts	3,649	0.10	0	New
Party of Free Democrats	2,203	0.06	0	New
Native Land	2,052	0.06	0	New
NZP Nikola Petkov	1,918	0.05	0	New
Independents	12,827	0.35	0	0
Total	3,648,177	100.00	240	0
Valid votes	3,648,177	97.34		
Invalid/blank votes	99,616	2.66		
Total votes	3,747,793	100.00		
Registered voters/turnout	6,720,941	55.76		
Source: CIK

== Aftermath ==
As no one party received a majority in the Assembly, the BSP was faced with the task of putting together a coalition government. The BSP faced many difficulties when trying to establish a coalition as all of the other political parties that had crossed the 4% threshold in the parliament were to the right of them, meaning compromise would be needed to ensure a workable coalition agreement. The BSP tried to form a coalition of the three largest parties: the BSP, the NDSV, and the DPS. While they gained the support of the DPS, they failed to gain the support of the NDSV. The BSP tried to enter into a two party minority government with DPS as their coalition partner; however, this was rejected by parliament when despite voting for Stanishev to be prime minister in a close 120 to 119 vote, the parliament voted against his proposed cabinet. As per the constitution the mandate to form a government was passed to the next largest political party, NDSV. On August 11, NDSV announced that they had decided to reject the offer due to the "complicated political situation". This then lead to DPS, the third largest party, to receive the mandate to try and form a coalition government. After talks with the leaders of the two largest parties, Ahmed Dogan, the leader of DPS, was able to form a coalition agreement between the BSP, NDSV, and his own DPS. Stanishev, leader of the BSP was elected prime minister and the coalition held 169 seats in the 240 seat parliament.
