= Evdokiya Maneva =

Bulgarian politician

Personal details
- Born: 20 March 1945 (age 81) Sofia, Bulgaria
- Profession: Politician

Evdokiya Ivanova Maneva-Babulkova (Bulgarian: Евдокия Иванова Манева-Бабулкова) (born March 20, 1945) is a Bulgarian politician who served as Minister of Environment in the Kostov government between 1997 and 2001.

== Life ==
Maneva was born in Sofia and completed studies in chemical engineering in the Soviet Union. She obtained a doctorate in economics in Moscow in 1983.

Between February and May 1997, Maneva served as vice-Prime Minister in the caretaker government of Stefan Sofiyanski before becoming a member of the Kostov cabinet. In 2001 she was temporarily the leader of the Sofia branch of the UDF.

In March 2013, she became the vice-Minister of the Environment in the interim Raykov government.

Maneva was also among the candidates considered for the Bliznashki government that was appointed by Rosen Plevneliev in the aftermath of Plamen Oresharski's resignation as Prime Minister.
