= Konstantin Dimitrov =

Bulgarian politician

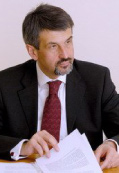
Konstantin Dimitrov

Konstantin Stefanov Dimitrov (Bulgarian: Константин Стефанов Димитров) (born 28 January 1957 in Sofia) is a Bulgarian politician and a Member of the European Parliament (MEP) until 2007. Dimitrov is a member of the Democrats for a Strong Bulgaria party, part of the European People's Party–European Democrats, and became an MEP on 1 January 2007 with the accession of Bulgaria to the European Union.

In January 2013, under the leadership of Dimitrov, the Embassy of Bulgaria was the first embassy in the UK to be awarded the Grassroot Diplomat Initiative Honouree for its contributions to the Bulgarian School based at the embassy.
