= Mladen Petrov Chervenyakov =

Bulgarian politician

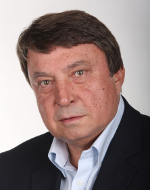
Portrait of Chervenyakov

Mladen Petrov Chervenyakov (Bulgarian: Младен Петров Червеняков) (born 22 August 1954) is a Bulgarian politician and Member of the European Parliament (MEP). Chervenyakov is a member of the Coalition for Bulgaria, part of the Party of European Socialists, and became an MEP on 1 January 2007 with the accession of Bulgaria to the European Union.
