= Emel Etem Toshkova =

Bulgarian politician

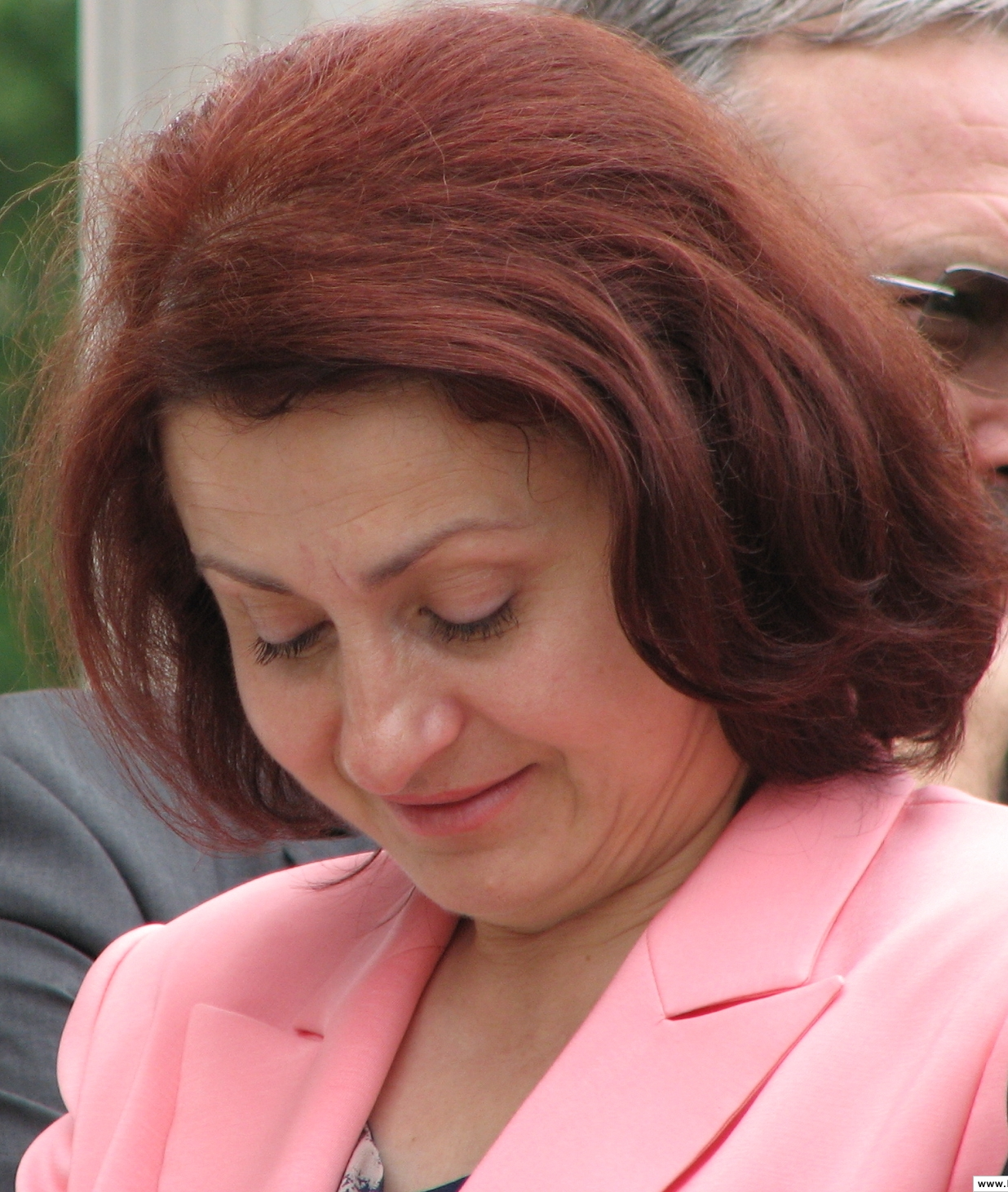
Emel Etem Toshkova

Emel Etem Toshkova (Bulgarian: Емел Етем Тошкова) (born 4 March 1958) is a Bulgarian politician of Turkish descent with the Movement for Rights and Freedoms (MRF), the main Turkish party in Bulgaria. She is the ex-Deputy Prime Minister of Bulgaria and the ex-Minister of the no longer existing National Disasters and Emergencies. Her constituency is Razgrad.

== Biography ==
Emel Toshkova was born on 4 March 1958 in the town of Isperih. In 1981, she graduated from "Angel Kunchev" Higher Technical School in Ruse and earned a master's degree in Mechanical Engineering. From 1981 to 1992 she worked at the Naiden Kirov plant also in Ruse as a Construction Engineer.

Between 17 August 2005 and July 2009, Emel Toshkova was Deputy Prime Minister and Minister of Emergencies.

== Political career ==
Emel Etem was criticized in Bulgaria for being incompetent as Minister of Natural Disasters and Emergencies. She is sometimes called "Mrs. Disaster" by her critics for her supposed inadequate behavior (failing to provide basic relief) during the floods at Tsar Kaloyan, a town which has a significant Turkish population and also for the ill preparation for the snowfall in February 2008 in Bulgaria.

== Miscellaneous facts ==
- Her name, Emel, means "desire" or "desirable" in Turkish.
- She is fluent in Bulgarian, Turkish, English and Russian.
- She is married and has a son.
- A star in the Cassiopeia constellation is named after her.

== See also ==
- Turks in Bulgaria
- Politics of Bulgaria
