= Atanas Paparizov =

Bulgarian politician

Atanas Atanassov Paparizov (Bulgarian: Атанас Атанасов Папаризов; born 5 July 1951 in Sofia) is a Bulgarian politician and Member of the European Parliament. He is a member of the Coalition for Bulgaria, part of the Party of European Socialists, and became an MEP on 1 January 2007 with the accession of Bulgaria to the European Union.
