= Stanimir Ilchev =

Bulgarian politician

Stanimir Yankov Ilchev (Bulgarian: Станимир Янков Илчев) (born 31 July 1953 in Burgas) is a Bulgarian politician and former Member of the European Parliament (MEP). He is a member of the National Movement Simeon II, part of the Alliance of Liberals and Democrats for Europe. With the accession of Bulgaria to the European Union on 1 January 2007 he was selected by the National Assembly to become a Member of the European Parliament, having already spent two years as an observer. He did not get reelected in the European Parliament election held several months later, that determined the Bulgarian MEPs that would serve during the rest of the term of the Sixth European Parliament. In 2015, he became one of three co-leaders of NDSV, a position he held until 2023 when he was chosen as the sole party leader.
