= United Democratic Forces (Bulgaria) =

The United Democratic Forces (Bulgarian: Обединени Демократични Сили, ОДС/ODS) were a center-right electoral alliance in Bulgaria, led by the Union of Democratic Forces.

== Members of the coalition ==
1997

- Union of Democratic Forces (Sayuz na Demokratichnite Sili)
- Bulgarian Agrarian People's Union (Bulgarski Zemedelski Naroden Sayuz)
- Democratic Party (Demokraticheska Partiya)
- Bulgarian Social Democratic Party (Bulgarska Socialdemokraticheska Partiya)
- Radical Democratic Party (Radikaldemokraticheska Partiya)

2001

- Union of Democratic Forces (Sayuz na Demokratichnite Sili)
- Bulgarian Agrarian People's Union - People's Union (Bulgarski Zemedelski Naroden Sayuz - Naroden Sayuz)
- Democratic Party (Demokraticheska Partiya)
- Bulgarian Social Democratic Party (Bulgarska Socialdemokraticheska Partiya)
- National Movement for Rights and Freedoms (Natsionalno Dvizhenie za Prava i Svobodi)
- Radical Democratic Party (Radikaldemokraticheska Partiya)
- Union of Free Democrats (Sajuz na Svobodnite Demokrati)

2005

- Union of Democratic Forces (Sayuz na Demokratichnite Sili)
- Democratic Party (Demokraticheska Partiya)
- Bulgarian Agrarian People's Union (Bulgarski Zemedelski Naroden Sayuz)
- George's Day Movement (Dvizhenie Gergiovden)
- National Association - Bulgarian Agrarian People's Union (Natsionalno Sdruzhenie - Bulgarski Zemedelski Naroden Sayuz)
- Movement for an Equal Public Model (Dvizhenie za Ravnopraven Model)
- Radical Democratic Party (Radikaldemokraticheska Partiya)

== Elections results ==
- In the 1997 Bulgarian parliamentary election the Coalition won 49,2% of the popular vote and 139 out of 240 seats.
- In the 2001 Bulgarian parliamentary election, the coalition won 18.2% of the popular vote and 51 out of 240 seats.
- In the 2005 Bulgarian parliamentary election, the coalition won 7,7% of the popular vote and 20 of 240 seats
