= Chetin Kazak =

Bulgarian politician (born 1972)

Personal details
- Born: Chetin Husein Kazak; 29 July 1972 (age 53) Targovishte, Bulgaria
- Party: Movement for rights and freedom

Chetin Husein Kazak (Bulgarian: Четин Хюсеин Казак Turkish: Çetin Hüseyin Kazak; born 29 July 1972 in Targovishte) is a Bulgarian politician of Turkish descent and Member of the European Parliament (MEP). He is a member of the Movement for Rights and Freedoms, part of the Alliance of Liberals and Democrats for Europe, and became an MEP on 1 January 2007 with the accession of Bulgaria to the European Union. Kazak is of Turkish ethnic origin.
