= Antonia Parvanova =

Bulgarian politician

Antonia Parvanova MEP
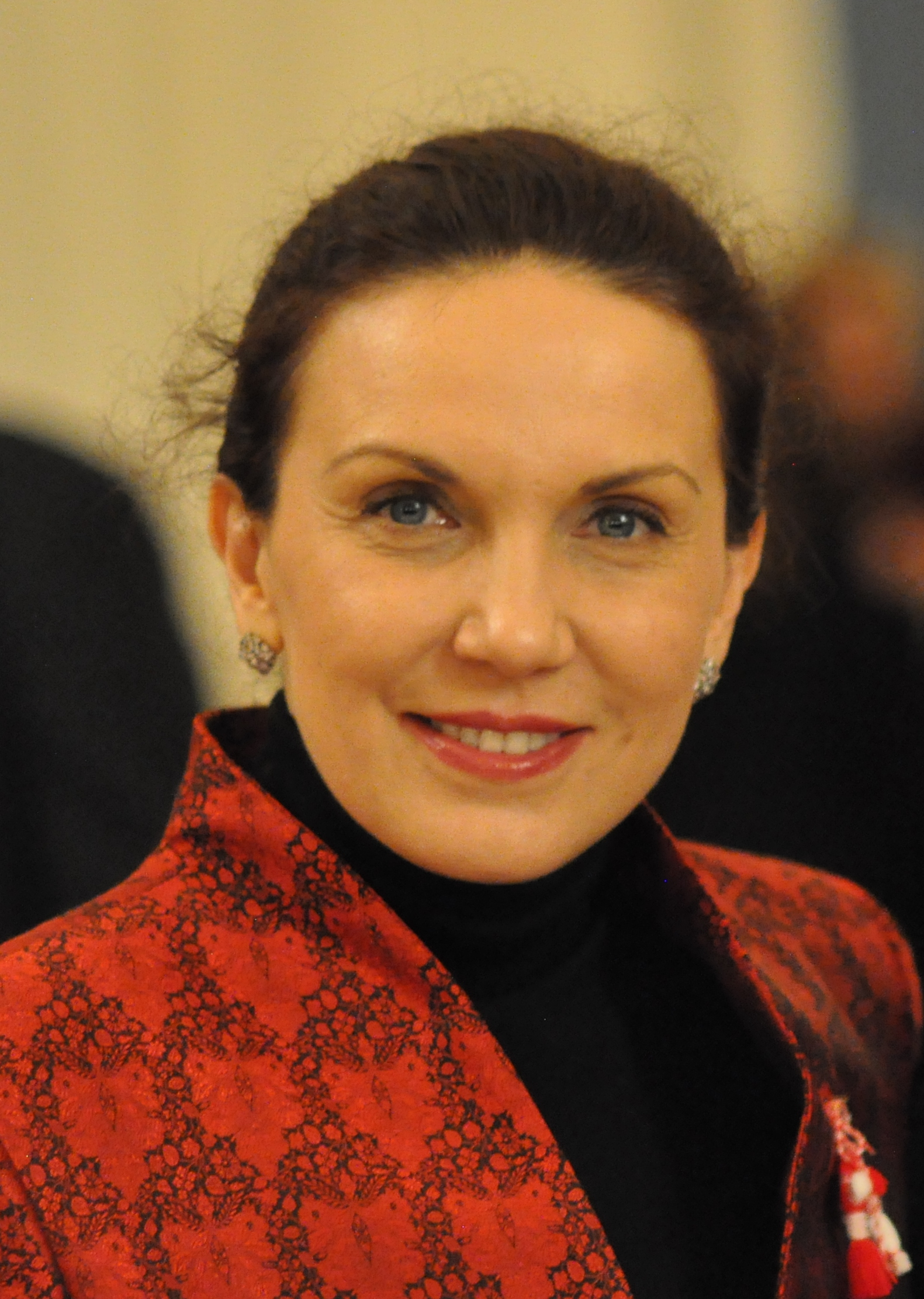

Member of the European Parliament
- In office 2009–2014

Personal details
- Born: 26 April 1962 (age 63) Dobrich, Bulgaria
- Party: National Movement Simeon II; Alliance of Liberals and Democrats for Europe

Antonyia Parvanova (Bulgarian: Антония Първанова; born 26 April 1962, in Dobrich) is a Bulgarian politician who served as a Member of the European Parliament in 2007 and from 2009 until 2014. She is a member of the National Movement Simeon II, part of the Alliance of Liberals and Democrats for Europe.

== Political career ==
Parvanova became a Member of the European Parliament on 1 January 2007 with the accession of Bulgaria to the European Union. During her time in parliament, she served on the Committee on the Environment, Public Health and Food Safety (2007, 2009–2014) and the Committee on Women's Rights and Gender Equality (2009–2014).

In addition to her committee assignments, Parvanova was part of the parliament's delegations for relations with Canada and to the Parliamentary Assembly of the Union for the Mediterranean from 2009 until 2014.
