= Stefan Sofiyanski =

Prime Minister of Bulgaria in 1997

- Стефан Софиянски
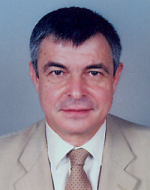

Prime Minister of Bulgaria
- In office 13 February 1997 – 21 May 1997
- President: Petur Stoyanov
- Preceded by: Zhan Videnov
- Succeeded by: Ivan Kostov

Mayor of Sofia
- In office 19 November 1995 – 29 June 2005
- Preceded by: Alexander Yanchulev
- Succeeded by: Boyko Borisov

Personal details
- Born: 7 November 1951 (age 74) Sofia, Bulgaria
- Party: Union of Free Democrats (2001-present); Union of Democratic Forces (until 2001)
- Education: University of National and World Economy

Stefan Antonov Sofiyanski (Bulgarian: Стефан Антонов Софиянски [ˈstɛfɐn sofiˈjanski]; born 7 November 1951) is a Bulgarian politician who served as interim Prime Minister of Bulgaria in 1997 and was a three-term Mayor of Sofia. He was a leading member of the Union of Democratic Forces.

Sofiyanski was born in Sofia in 1951. He was a statistics graduate from the Karl Marx Higher Institute of Economics and held a number of positions in the Ministry of Communications and Information during communist rule. He served in the cabinet of Filip Dimitrov and became one of the leading members of the UDF. He was elected Mayor of Sofia in 1995 and served in this position, being re-elected twice - in 1999 and 2003, until 2005 when he resigned to become a parliamentary deputy. He was appointed as caretaker Prime Minister by President Petar Stoyanov in 1997 until snap election and such time as Ivan Kostov could form a government.

In 2001 he announced that he was to leave the UDF and form his own party. He ultimately formed the Union of Free Democrats and, although it initially remained a part of the UDF, Sofiyanski and his party threw in their lot in with the Bulgarian People's Union. On January 1, 2007 he joined the European Parliament as one of Bulgaria's interim members until the elections in May of the same year.

In June 2008 Sofiyanski drew criticism from human rights advocates for his homophobic remarks following Bulgaria's first gay pride parade. In an interview for Darik Radio Sofiyanski said he "would never have authorized the parade," had he still been Sofia's mayor. With regard to the LGBT community, he stated that "those people have their rights to personal choice and privacy, however, homosexuality is condemned by the Bible and is unnatural, and has no right to publicity. It is as if thieves had a parade — because those people are thieves of morality."
