= Bulgarian People's Union =

Bulgarian People's Union Български народен съюз
- Founded: 2005
- Dissolved: 2006
- Ideology: Conservatism; Agrarianism; Bulgarian nationalism
- Political position: Centre-right to right-wing
- Member parties: BZNS-NS; IMRO-BNM; SSD

The Bulgarian People's Union (Bulgarian: Български народен съюз) was a centre-right electoral alliance in Bulgaria. It contested only one legislative election: that on 25 June 2005. It won 5.7% of the popular vote and 13 out of 240 seats. The Union was composed by the Bulgarian Agrarian People's Union-People's Union (Bulgarian: Български Земеделски Народен Съюз-Народен Съюз), the IMRO – Bulgarian National Movement (Bulgarian: Ватрешна Македонска Револуционна Организация-Българско Национално Движение) and the Union of Free Democrats (Съюз на свободните демократи).

In 2006 several corruption scandals were connected to the leader of BPU – the former mayor of capital city of Sofia – Stefan Sofiyanski. Political surveys in 2006 showed seriously decreasing support for the BPU.

The alliance disbanded later that year.
