= National Movement for Stability and Progress =

Bulgarian political party

National Movement for Stability and Progress Национално движение за стабилност и възход
- Abbreviation: NDSV (Bulgarian)
- Leader: Stanimir Ilchev
- Founder: Simeon Sakskoburggotski
- Founded: 6 April 2001
- Headquarters: Sofia
- Ideology: Populism; Liberalism; Conservative liberalism
- Political position: Centre to centre-right
- European affiliation: Alliance of Liberals and Democrats for Europe
- International affiliation: Liberal International
- Colors: Yellow
- National Assembly: 0 / 240
- European Parliament: 0 / 17

Party flag

Website
- www.ndsv.bg

The National Movement for Stability and Progress (Bulgarian: Национално движение за стабилност и възход, romanized: Natsionalno dvizhenie za stabilnost i vazhod, NDSV) is a liberal, populist political party in Bulgaria. It was known as the National Movement Simeon II (Bulgarian: Национално движение „Симеон Втори“, romanized: Natsionalno dvizhenie "Simeon Vtori") until 3 June 2007.

The party was created as a personal vehicle of Simeon of Saxe-Coburg-Gotha (Simeon II), the last Bulgarian Tsar (albeit nominally), who was deposed following the 1944 Bulgarian coup d'état in 1946, for his successful bid to become Prime Minister of Bulgaria in 2001. Simeon served as prime minister until 2005 and the party remained part of the governing coalition until 2009, when they lost all their seats in the National Assembly.

== History ==
=== Foundation and government ===
NDSV was founded in April 2001, only 11 weeks ahead of a parliamentary election, after former Tsar Simeon II had announced his intention to become involved in the political life of Bulgaria. He promised to attract foreign investors, reduce taxes and uproot corruption within the first 800 days of his premiership. The movement met with immediate enthusiasm and won 42.7% of the popular vote and 120 out of 240 seats in the 2001 elections. One seat short of an absolute majority, it formed a coalition with the ethnic minority party Movement for Rights and Freedoms with Simeon Sakskoburggotski (his official name in Bulgarian since the end of monarchy) becoming prime minister. NDSV's popularity decreased markedly when Simeon failed to fulfill his promises within the specified time. However, it was during Simeon's term that Bulgaria entered NATO and prepared the economic and political stability that was prerequisite for the country becoming a member of the European Union in 2007. The NDSV party became a full member of the Liberal International at its Sofia Congress in May 2005.

=== Decline ===
At the 2005 parliamentary election, NDSV's share of votes dropped to 19.9% and its number of seats in parliament dropped to 53. It did, however, remain in office as the junior partner in a coalition led by the Bulgarian Socialist Party. NDSV member Meglena Kuneva served as Bulgarian EU Commissioner charged with consumer protection in the First Barroso Commission from Bulgaria's entry to the EU in 2007 until 2010. The party changed its name in June 2007, removing the name of the founder and leader and replacing it with "Stability and Progress", but retaining its Bulgarian acronym NDSV. At the European parliamentary election of June 2009 the party gained 7.96% of the votes and took two out of the seventeen seats. However, a month later the party got just 3.01% of votes in the July 2009 parliamentary elections, falling short of the 4% election threshold for representation. The next day, on 6 July, Simeon resigned as NDSV leader. In July 2012 Meglena Kuneva left the party to establish the Bulgaria for Citizens Movement. In the 2013 parliamentary election, the NDSV did not field any candidates. In the 2014 election, it won just 0.24% of the votes, while the party decided not to run in the 2017 election. The party did not participate in any of the elections in 2021 for failure to gain the 2,500 signatures required. The party would not stand for any of the elections in 2021, in April, July or November and did not stand for the 2022 Bulgarian parliamentary election.

=== Revival ===
Following the 2014 election, the party's national council elected Stanimir Ilchev, Olimpi Katev, and Sabi Davidov, as co-chairmen of the party in their 8th convocation in 2015. There would not be another convocation of the national council until 2023. The council, which had largely been vacant, was revitalized and former prime minister Ognyan Gerdzhikov announced in December 2022 that the party's national council was formed and that they would convene for a 9th convocation to elect a new chairman of the party in January 2023. Ilchev was elected the party's sole chairman. A month before this announcement Simeon Sakskoburggotski held a closed door meeting with the Russian ambassador. The party received 0.26% of the vote in the 2023 Bulgarian parliamentary election well below the 4% threshold for seats in the National Assembly.

On 12 May 2023, NDSV held a party conference, at which it was agreed that a re-branding of the party was necessary, additionally, major organizational flaws inside the party were noted by its Chairman, Stranimir Ilchev.

== Election results ==
=== National Assembly ===
| Election | Votes | % | Seats | +/– | Government |
|---|---|---|---|---|---|
| 2001 | 1,952,513 | 42.74 (#1) | 120 / 240 | ▲120 | Coalition |
| 2005 | 725,314 | 19.88 (#2) | 53 / 240 | ▼67 | Coalition |
| 2009 | 127,470 | 3.02 (#8) | 0 / 240 | ▼53 | Extra-parliamentary |
| 2013 | Did not contest | | | | |
| 2014 | 7,917 | 0.24 (#17) | 0 / 240 | 0 | Extra-parliamentary |
| 2017 | Did not contest | | | | |
| Apr 2021 | Did not contest | | | | |
| Jul 2021 | Did not contest | | | | |
| Nov 2021 | Did not contest | | | | |
| 2022 | Did not contest | | | | |
| 2023 | 6,764 | 0.25 (#13) | 0 / 240 | 0 | Extra-parliamentary |
| Jun 2024 (Note: Run as part of the Blue Bulgaria coalition.) | 33,613 | 1.52 (#9) | 0 / 240 | 0 | Extra-parliamentary |

=== European Parliament ===
| Election | List leader | Votes | % | Seats | +/– | EP Group |
|---|---|---|---|---|---|---|
| 2007 | Bilyana Raeva | 121,398 | 6.27 (#5) | 1 / 18 | New | ALDE |
| 2009 | Meglena Kuneva | 205,146 | 7.96 (#5) | 2 / 17 | ▲1 | ALDE |
| 2014 (Note: Run as part of the Coalition KOD.) | Antonia Parvanova | 20,487 | 0.92 (#10) | 0 / 17 | ▼2 | – |
| 2019 (Note: Run in a joint list with New Time.) | Rumen Cholakov | 21,315 | 1.09 (#8) | 0 / 17 | 0 | – |
| 2024 (Note: Run as part of the Blue Bulgaria coalition.) | Tsveta Kirilova | 24,917 | 1.24 (#10) | 0 / 17 | 0 | – |

== See also ==
- Liberalism and radicalism in Bulgaria
- GERB
