= 48th National Assembly of Bulgaria =

2022 legislature in Bulgaria

48th National Assembly 48-мо Народно събрание

History
- Founded: October 19, 2022
- Disbanded: February 2, 2023
- Preceded by: 47th National Assembly
- Succeeded by: 49th National Assembly

Leadership
- Speaker: Vezhdi Rashidov (GERB)
- Deputy Speakers: Rosen Zhelyazkov; Nikola Minchev; Kristian Vigenin; Atanas Atanasov; Yordan Tsonev; Tsoncho Ganev; Nadezhda Samardzhieva

Structure
- Seats: 240
- Political groups: GERB—SDS (67) PP (53) DPS (36) Revival (27) BSP (24) DB (20) BV (12) Independent (1)

Meeting place
- National Assembly Building, Sofia

Website
- parliament.bg

The Forty-Eighth National Assembly (Bulgarian: Четиридесет и осмото народно събрание) was a convocation of the National Assembly of Bulgaria, formed according to the results of the early parliamentary elections in Bulgaria, held on 2 October 2022. It was dissolved by the President of Bulgaria on 3 February 2023.

== Composition ==
This list includes all current members of the 48 National Assembly.

Constituency	Deputy	Party	Group	Birth date	Notes
16th MMC – Plovdiv-city	Vezhdi Rashidov	GERB	GERB-SDS	14 December 1951	Chairman of the National Assembly
1st MMC – Blagoevgrad	Rosen Zhelyazkov	GERB	GERB-SDS	5 April 1968	Deputy Chairman of the National Assembly
26th MMC – Sofia-province	Alexander Ivanov	GERB	GERB-SDS	29 August 1982	
23rd MMC – Sofia-city 23	Alexander Nenkov	GERB	GERB-SDS	7 November 1983	
2nd MMC – Burgas	Andrey Runchev	GERB	GERB-SDS	28 July 1977	
25th MMC - Sofia-city 25	Anna Alexandrova	GERB	GERB-SDS	25 February 1972	
3rd MMC – Varna	Branimir Balachev	GERB	GERB-SDS	20 November 1952	
26th MMC – Sofia-province	Valentin Milushev	GERB	GERB-SDS	15 March 1966	
2nd MMC – Burgas	Galya Zhelyazkova	GERB	GERB-SDS	18 May 1988	
11th MMC – Lovech	Georg Georgiev	GERB	GERB-SDS	20 October 1991	
1st MMC – Blagoevgrad	Georgi Georgiev	GERB	GERB-SDS	17 September 1969	
29th MMC – Haskovo	Georgi Stankov	GERB	GERB-SDS	4 May 1963	
18th MMC – Razgrad	Gyunay Hyusmen	GERB	GERB-SDS	11 May 1966	
3rd MMC – Varna	Daniel Mitov	GERB	GERB-SDS	4 December 1977	
29th MMC – Haskovo	Delyan Dobrev	GERB	GERB-SDS	14 May 1978	
8th MMC – Dobrich	Denitsa Sacheva	GERB	GERB-SDS	2 November 1973	
15th MMC – Pleven	Denitsa Nikolova	GERB	GERB-SDS	23 July 1977	
19th MMC – Ruse	Desislava Atanasova	GERB	GERB-SDS	8 October 1978	GERB-SDS parliamentary group chairwoman
21st MMC – Sliven	Desislava Taneva	GERB	GERB-SDS	9 June 1972	
17th MMC – Plovdiv-province	Desislava Trifonova	GERB	GERB-SDS	8 November 1985	
31st MMC – Yambol	Dimitar Angelov	GERB	GERB-SDS	10 July 1980	
13th MMC – Pazardzhik	Dimitar Gechev	GERB	GERB-SDS	16 February 1983	
4th MMC – Veliko Tarnovo	Dimitar Nikolov	GERB	GERB-SDS	27 November 1975	
19th MMC – Ruse	Dragomir Draganov	GERB	GERB-SDS	22 August 1958	
24th MMC - Sofia-city 24	Evgeniya Alexiyeva	GERB	GERB-SDS	3 October 1979	
13th MMC – Pazardzhik	Ekaterina Zaharieva	GERB	GERB-SDS	8 August 1975	
