= 41st National Assembly of Bulgaria =

2009 legislature in Bulgaria

41st National Assembly 41-во Народно събрание

History
- Founded: July 14, 2009
- Disbanded: March 15, 2013
- Preceded by: 40th National Assembly
- Succeeded by: 42nd National Assembly

Leadership
- Speaker: Tsetska Tsacheva (GERB)
- Deputy Speakers: Georgi Pirinski; Ekaterina Mihaylova; Menda Stoyanova; Hristo Biserov; Atanas Semov; Pavel Shopov

Structure
- Seats: 240
- Political groups: Government (117) GERB (117) Confidence and supply (25) SK (15) RZS (10) Opposition (98) BSP (40) DPS (37) Attack (21)

Meeting place
- National Assembly Building, Sofia

Website
- parliament.bg

The Forty-First National Assembly (Bulgarian: Четиридесет и първото народно събрание) was a convocation of the National Assembly of Bulgaria, formed according to the results of the parliamentary elections in Bulgaria, held on July 5, 2009.

== History ==
The 2009 election saw a clear winner in the face of GERB, a new centre-right party, led by the then Mayor of Sofia, Boyko Borisov. GERB proposed a minority government with Borisov as Prime Minister, which received the support of the Blue Coalition and RZS and was sworn in on 27 July.
The government's term was reaching its end when it resigned due to nationwide protests against high electricity prices.

== Members ==
The seat allocation was recalculated twice during the Assembly's term. (Note: In October 2009 the Central Elecoral Commission annulled the election of 2 MPs from the Ruse and Dobrich MMCs.) (Note: In February 2010 the Constitutional Court annulled the election of 3 MPs from the Gabrovo, Sofia 23 and Dobrich MMCs.) A list of MPs and their parliamentary groups is presented below:

GERB	KzB	DPS	Attack	Blue Coalition	RZS	Independent	Vacant

MMC	Coalition	Name
Blagoevgrad	GERB	Atanas Kambitov Yordan Andonov
Blagoevgrad	GERB	Georgi Ikonomov Veselin Davidov
Blagoevgrad	GERB	Georgi Andonov
Blagoevgrad	GERB	Lyuben Tatarski
Blagoevgrad	GERB	Mitko Zahov
Blagoevgrad	DPS	Aliosman Imamov
Blagoevgrad	DPS	Musa Palev
Blagoevgrad	KzB	Korneliya Ninova
Blagoevgrad	RZS	Yane Yanev
Blagoevgrad	Attack	Ognyan Tetimov
Burgas	GERB	Galina Mileva-Gerogieva
Burgas	GERB	Dimitar Petrov
Burgas	GERB	Ivan Valkov
Burgas	GERB	Stoyan Gyuzelev
Burgas	GERB	(Note: Bozhidar Dimitrov) Vyara Petrova Vyara Petrova
Burgas	GERB	Ivan Aleksiev Diana Yordanova
Burgas	DPS	Dzhevdet Chakarov
Burgas	DPS	Durhan Mustafa
Burgas	KzB	Penko Atanasov
Burgas	KzB	Plamen Oresharski
Burgas	Attack	Volen Siderov
Burgas	Attack	Ognyan Tetimov
Varna	GERB	Daniela Petrova
Varna	GERB	Dimitar Atanasov
Varna	GERB	Emil Radev
Varna	GERB	Krasimir Petrov
Varna	GERB	Nikolay Kostadinov
Varna	GERB	Pavel Dimitrov
Varna	GERB	Svetoslav Nedelchev
Varna	GERB	Svilen Kraychev Liliya Hristova
Varna	KzB	Andrey Pantev
Varna	KzB	Sergey Stanishev
Varna	Attack	Dimitar Karbov
Varna	Attack	Tsveta Georgieva
Varna	DPS	Yordan Tsonev
V. Tarnovo	GERB	(Note: Tsvetan G. Tsvetanov) Asparuh Stamenov
V. Tarnovo	GERB	Evgeni Stoev
V. Tarnovo	GERB	Miroslav Petkov
V. Tarnovo	GERB	Hristo Hristov
V. Tarnovo	Attack	Borislav Stoyanov
V. Tarnovo	DPS	Hasan Hadzhihasan
V. Tarnovo	KzB	Boyko Velikov
V. Tarnovo	RZS	Tsvetan A. Tsvetanov
V. Tarnovo	BC	Vanyo Sharkov
Vidin	GERB	Vladimir Toshev
Vidin	GERB	Lyubomila Stanislavova
Vidin	KzB	Mihail Mikov
Vidin	RZS	Kristiyana Petrova
Vratsa	GERB	(Note: Miroslav Naydenov) Yanko Sdravkov
Vratsa	GERB	Nikolay Kotsev Valeri Angelov
Vratsa	GERB	Nikolay Rashev
Vratsa	Attack	Ventsislav Lakov
Vratsa	KzB	Georgi Bozhinov
Vratsa	BC	Asen Agov
Vratsa	RZS	Mario Tagarinski
Gabrovo	GERB	Galina Bankovska
Gabrovo	GERB	Tsvetomir Mihov
Gabrovo	GERB	Ivan T. Ivanov Katya Koleva
Gabrovo	KzB	Ivelin Nikolov
Gabrovo	BC/RZS	(Note: Mariana Darakchieva) Georgi Terziyski
Dobrich	GERB	Rumen Ivanov
Dobrich	GERB	Svetomir Mihaylov
Dobrich	GERB	Vanya Georgieva (Note: Todor Georgiev)
Dobrich	KzB	Petar Dimitrov
Dobrich	Attack	Valentin Ivanov
Dobrich	BC/DPS/BC	(Note: Ventsislav Varbanov) (Note: Rushen Riza) Ventsislav Varbanov
Dobrich	DPS	Korman Isamilov
Kardzhali	GERB	(Note: Vezhdi Rashidov) Tsveta Karayancheva
Kardzhali	DPS	Ahmed Dogan
Kardzhali	DPS	Nedzhmi Ali
Kardzhali	DPS	Remzi Osman
Kardzhali	DPS	Yunal Tasim
Kyustendil	GERB	Valentin Mikev
Kyustendil	GERB	Emil Gushterov
Kyustendil	GERB	Kiril Kalfin
Kyustendil	KzB	Maya Manolova
Kyustendil	RZS	Dimitar Chukarski
Lovech	GERB	Anatoliy Yordanov
Lovech	GERB	Stanka Shaylekova
Lovech	GERB	Mihail Nikolovski Hristofor Achkov
Lovech	KzB	(Note: Evgeniy Uzunov) Dimitar Gorov
Lovech	Attack	Kiril Gumnerov
Montana	GERB	Dimitar Avramov Petar Yakimov
Montana	GERB	Plamen Tsekov Slatko Todorov
Montana	GERB	Iskra Iskrenova
Montana	BC	Lyubomir Ivanov
Montana	KzB	Yanaki Stoilov
Montana	RZS	Biserka Petrova
Pazardzhik	GERB	Angel Daskalov
Pazardzhik	GERB	Ginche Karaminova
Pazardzhik	GERB	Ivan D. Ivanov
Pazardzhik	GERB	Krasimira Simeonova
Pazardzhik	GERB	Nikola Belishki Petko Petkov
Pazardzhik	DPS	Delyan Peevski
Pazardzhik	DPS	Iskra Mihaylova
Pazardzhik	KzB	Georgi Pirinski
Pazardzhik	KzB	Georgi Petarneychev
Pernik	GERB	Vladislav Dimitrov
Pernik	GERB	Irena Sokolova
Pernik	GERB	Petar Petrov
Pernik	KzB	Angel Naydenov
Pernik	RZS	Dimitar Kolev
Pleven	GERB	Ivelin Nikolov
Pleven	GERB	Plamen Petrov
Pleven	GERB	Hristina Yancheva
Pleven	GERB	Tsetska Tsacheva
Pleven	KzB	Georgi Atanasov
Pleven	KzB	Rumen Petkov
Pleven	Attack	Desislav Chukolov
Pleven	DPS	Mithat Metin
Pleven	RZS	Darin Matov
Pleven	BC	Tsvetan Kostov
Plovdiv	GERB	Velichka Shopova
Plovdiv	GERB	Soya Georgieva
Plovdiv	GERB	Kostadin Yazov
Plovdiv	GERB	Menda Stoyanova
Plovdiv	GERB	Stefan Dedov
Plovdiv	GERB	(Note: Ivan Totev) Antoniy Yordanov
Plovdiv	KzB	Zahari Georgiev
Plovdiv	KzB	Stefan Danailov
Plovdiv	Attack	Pavel Shopov
Plovdiv	BC	Dimo Gyaurov
Plovdiv Obl.	GERB	Georgi Plachkov
Plovdiv Obl.	GERB	Dimitar Lazarov
Plovdiv Obl.	GERB	Iliya Pashev
Plovdiv Obl.	GERB	Nikolay Petkov
Plovdiv Obl.	GERB	Silviya Hubenova
Plovdiv Obl.	DPS	Petya Raeva
Plovdiv Obl.	DPS	Tundzhay Naimov
Plovdiv Obl.	KzB	Milena Hristova
Plovdiv Obl.	KzB	Petar Mutafchiev
Plovdiv Obl.	Attack	Ognyan Yanakiev
Plovdiv Obl.	BC	Yordan Bakalov
Razgrad	DPS	Belgin Shukri
Razgrad	DPS	Nigyar Dzhafev
Razgrad	DPS	Ramadan Atalay
Razgrad	DPS	Hassan Ademov
Razgrad	GERB	Todor Dimitrov
Ruse	GERB	Daniela Mitkova
Ruse	GERB	Plamen Nunev
Ruse	GERB	Svetlana Naydenova
Ruse	GERB	Desislava Atanasova Petar Daskalov
Ruse	DPS	Emel Toshkova
Ruse	KzB	Meglena Plugchieva Dobrin Danev
Ruse	Attack	Lyubomir Vladimirov
Ruse	DPS/BC	(Note: Byurhan Abazov) Mihail Mihaylov
Silistra	DPS	Gyunay Sefer
Silistra	DPS	Kamen Kostadinov
Silistra	DPS	Mithat Tabakov
Silistra	KzB	Anton Kutev
Silistra	GERB	Stefan Gospodinov
Sliven	GERB	Desislava Taneva
Sliven	GERB	Dian Chervenkondev
Sliven	GERB	Yuliana Koleva (Note: Mariana Ivanova-Nikolova)
Sliven	Attack	Kalina Krumova
Sliven	DPS	Yanko Yankov
Sliven	KzB	Asen Gagauzov
Sliven	BC	Kircho Dimitrov
Smolyan	GERB	Daniela Daritkova-Prodanova
Smolyan	GERB	Nikolay Melemov Nedyalko Slavov
Smolyan	DPS	Arif Agush
Smolyan	DPS	Elin Andreev
Smolyan	KzB	Dimcho Mihalevski
Sofia 23	GERB	Aleksandar Nenkov
Sofia 23	GERB	Boris Grozdanov
Sofia 23	GERB	Dimitar Glavchev
Sofia 23	GERB	Emanuela Spasova
Sofia 23	GERB	Teodora Georgieva
Sofia 23	GERB	Valentin Nikolov Antoniy Krastev
Sofia 23	KzB	Rumen Ovcharov
Sofia 23	KzB	Anna Yaneva Vanya Dobreva
Sofia 23	BC	Ivan Kostov
Sofia 23	BC	Lachezar Toshev
Sofia 23	Attack	Yavor Notev
Sofia 23	RZS/GERB	(Note: Atanas Semov) Rumen Stoilov
Sofia 24	GERB	Genoveva Aleksieva
Sofia 24	GERB	Dzhema Grozdanova
Sofia 24	GERB	Lachezar Ivanov
Sofia 24	GERB	(Note: Yordanka Fandakova) Stefani Mihaylova
Sofia 24	GERB	Stoyan Mavrodiev Tanya Vazharova
Sofia 24	GERB	Monika Panayotova (Note: Veselin Spiridonov)
Sofia 24	BC	Martin Dimitrov
Sofia 24	BC	Veselin Metodiev
Sofia 24	KzB	Lyuben Kornezov
Sofia 24	KzB	Petar Kurumbashev
Sofia 24	Attack	Denitsa Gadzheva
Sofia 25	GERB	Dobroslav Dimitrov
Sofia 25	GERB	Ivan Bozhilov
Sofia 25	GERB	Yoana Kirova
Sofia 25	GERB	Krasimir Tsipov
Sofia 25	GERB	Krasimir Velchev
Sofia 25	GERB	Stanislav Ivanov
Sofia 25	GERB	(Note: Vladislav Goranov) Snezhana Dukova
Sofia 25	KzB	Aleksandar Radoslavov
Sofia 25	KzB	Valentina Bogdanova
Sofia 25	BC	Ekaterina Mihaylova
Sofia 25	Attack	Kamen Petkov
Sofia Obl.	GERB	Daniel Georgiev
Sofia Obl.	GERB	Emil Dimitrov
Sofia Obl.	GERB	Svetlin Tanchev
Sofia Obl.	GERB	Tsvetan Sichanov
Sofia Obl.	KzB	Dragomir Stoynev
Sofia Obl.	KzB	Kiril Dobrev
Sofia Obl.	Attack	Nikolay Pehlivanov
Sofia Obl.	DPS	Emil Ivanov
St. Zagora	GERB	Emil Karanikolov
St. Zagora	GERB	Ivan Kolev
St. Zagora	GERB	Neli Kalneva-Miteva
St. Zagora	GERB	Zhivko Todorov Plamen Rusev
St. Zagora	GERB	Nedyalko Nedyalkov Hristo Chaushev
St. Zagora	KzB	Evgeniy Zhelev
St. Zagora	KzB	Spas Panchev
St. Zagora	Attack	Petar Hlebarov
St. Zagora	DPS	Lyutvi Mestan
St. Zagora	RZS	Todor Velikov
St. Zagora	BC	Ivan N. Ivanov
Targovishte	DPS	Erdoan Ahmedov
Targovishte	DPS	Tuncher Kardzhaliev
Targovishte	DPS	Kasim Dal
Targovishte	KzB	Rumen Takorov
Targovishte	GERB	Lili Ivanova
Haskovo	GERB	Ivan P. Ivanov
Haskovo	GERB	Fani Hristova
Haskovo	GERB	Delyan Dobrev Rumen Danev
Haskovo	GERB	Ivo Dimov Katya Chalakova
Haskovo	DPS	Guyner Serbest
Haskovo	DPS	Yunal Lyufti
Haskovo	Attack	Stanislav Stanilov
Haskovo	KzB	Emiliya Maslarova
Shumen	DPS	Hristo Biserov
Shumen	DPS	Chetin Kazak
Shumen	DPS	Georgi Kolev Hamid Hamid
Shumen	GERB	Ivaylo Toshev
Shumen	GERB	Krasimir Minchev Ralitsa Angelova
Shumen	KzB	Dimitar Dabov
Yambol	GERB	Aleksandar Stoykov
Yambol	GERB	Svetoslav Tonchev
Yambol	GERB	Atanas Atanasov (Note: Mariya Petrova-Mincheva)
Yambol	KzB	Atanas Merdzhanov
Yambol	Attack	Ognyan Peychev
