= 9th MMC – Kardzhali =

Bulgarian constituency

Coordinates: 41°39′N 25°22′E

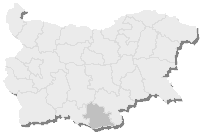
Map of Bulgaria, 9th MMC – Kardzhali is highlighted

9th Multi-member Constituency – Kardzhali is a constituency whose borders are the same as Kardzhali Province in Bulgaria.

== Background ==
In the 2009 Bulgarian parliamentary election, the 9th multi-member constituency – Kardzhali - elected 5 members to the Bulgarian National Assembly: 4 of them were by proportionality vote and 1 was by first-past-the-post voting.

== Members in the Bulgarian National Assembly ==
- By first-past-the-post voting

Election	Member	Party
2009		

- Through proportionality vote

Election	Member	Party
2009		
2009		
2009		
2009		

== Elections ==
2009 election

- proportionality vote

Party	Votes	%	Change	Seats	Change	
Citizens for European Development of Bulgaria						
Coalition for Bulgaria						
Movement for Rights and Freedoms						
National Union Attack						
National Movement for Stability and Progress						
Blue Coalition						
Lider (Bulgaria)						
Order, Lawfulness, Justice						
Others				—		—
Total-Valid				'—		
Invalid			—	—	—	—
Total Turnout			—	—	—	—

- first-past-the-post voting

Party	Candidate	Votes	%	Change
Citizens for European Development of Bulgaria	Vezhdi Rashidov			
Coalition for Bulgaria	Milko Bagdasarov			
Movement for Rights and Freedoms	Ahmed Dogan			
National Union Attack	Dimitar Avramov			
National Movement for Stability and Progress	Vasil Donchev			
Blue Coalition	Veselin Metodiev			
Lider (Bulgaria)	Sali Ibriam			
Order, Lawfulness, Justice	Filip Saraev			
Others				
Total Turnout			—	—

== See also ==
- 2009 Bulgarian parliamentary election
- Politics of Bulgaria
- List of Bulgarian Constituencies
