= 10th MMC – Kyustendil =

Bulgarian constituency

Coordinates: 42°15′N 23°0′E

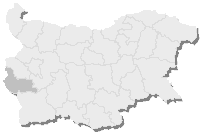
Map of Bulgaria, 10th MMC – Kyustendil is highlighted

10th Multi-member Constituency – Kyustendil is a constituency whose borders are the same as Kyustendil Province in Bulgaria.

== Background ==
In the 2009 Bulgarian parliamentary election the 10th Multi-member Constituency – Kyustendil elected 5 members to the Bulgarian National Assembly: 4 of which were through proportionality vote and 1 was through first-past-the-post voting.

== Members in the Bulgarian National Assembly ==
- Through first-past-the-post voting

Election	Member	Party
2009		

- Through proportionality vote

Election	Member	Party
2009		
2009		
2009		
2009		

== Elections ==
2009 election

- proportionality vote

Party	Votes	%	Change	Seats	Change	
Citizens for European Development of Bulgaria						
Coalition for Bulgaria						
Movement for Rights and Freedoms						
National Union Attack						
National Movement for Stability and Progress						
Blue Coalition						
Lider (Bulgaria)						
Order, Lawfulness, Justice						
Others				—		—
Total-Valid				'—		
Invalid			—	—	—	—
Total Turnout			—	—	—	—

- first-past-the-post voting

Party	Candidate	Votes	%	Change
Citizens for European Development of Bulgaria	Valentin Mikev			
Coalition for Bulgaria	Georgi Nikov			
National Union Attack	Metodi Stoynev			
National Movement for Stability and Progress	Vasil Ivanov			
Blue Coalition	Evgeni Chachev			
Lider (Bulgaria)	Nikifor Vangelov			
Order, Lawfulness, Justice	Dimitar Chukarski			
Others				
Total Turnout			—	—

== See also ==
- 2009 Bulgarian parliamentary election
- Politics of Bulgaria
- List of Bulgarian Constituencies
