= 25th Multi-member Constituency =

Bulgarian constituency

Coordinates: 42°43′33″N 23°17′8″E

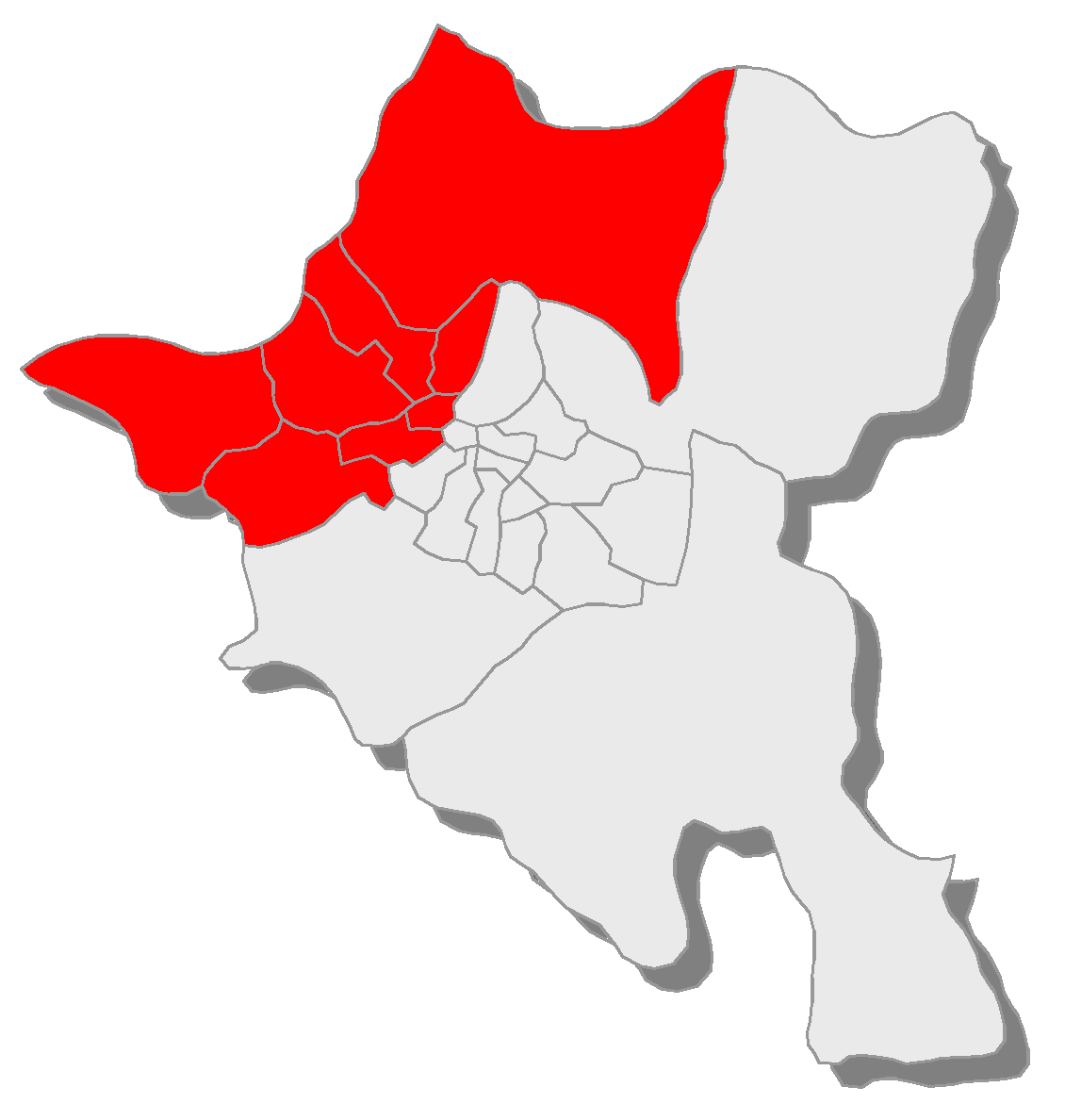
Карта на районите, които влизат в МИР 25

The 25th Multi-member Constituency (Bulgarian: 25-ти многомандатен избирателен район) is one of the five Bulgarian constituencies whose borders are different from the administrative division. It comprises several regions in Western and North-Western Sofia.

== Background ==
In the 2009 Bulgarian parliamentary election the 24th Multi-member Constituency – Sofia-23 elected 11 members to the Bulgarian National Assembly: 10 of which were by proportionality vote and 1 was by first-past-the-post voting.

== Members in the Bulgarian National Assembly ==
- Through first-past-the-post voting

Election	Member	Party
2009		

- Through proportionality vote

Election	Member	Party
2009		
2009		
2009		
2009		
2009		
2009		
2009		
2009		
2009		
2009		

== Elections ==
2009 election

- proportionality vote

Party	Votes	%	Change	Seats	Change	
Citizens for European Development of Bulgaria						
Coalition for Bulgaria						
Movement for Rights and Freedoms						
National Union Attack						
National Movement for Stability and Progress						
Blue Coalition						
Lider (Bulgaria)						
Order, Lawfulness, Justice						
Others				—		—
Total-Valid				'—		
Invalid			—	—	—	—
Total Turnout			—	—	—	—

- first-past-the-post voting

Party	Candidate	Votes	%	Change
Citizens for European Development of Bulgaria	Monika Panayotova			
Coalition for Bulgaria	Petar Kurumbashev			
National Union Attack	Kalina Krumova			
National Movement for Stability and Progress	Ognyan Gerdzhikov			
Blue Coalition	Ekaterina Mihailova			
Order, Lawfulness, Justice	Stefan Indzhov			
Others				
Total Turnout			—	—

== See also ==
- 2009 Bulgarian parliamentary election
- Politics of Bulgaria
- List of Bulgarian Constituencies
