= 22nd MMC – Smolyan =

Bulgarian constituency

Coordinates: 41°40′N 24°35′E

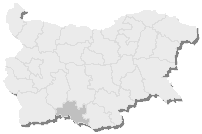
Map of Bulgaria, 22nd MMC – Smolyan is highlighted

22nd Multi-member Constituency – Smolyan is a constituency whose borders are the same as Smolyan Province in Bulgaria.

== Background ==
In the 2017 Bulgarian parliamentary election the 22nd Multi-member Constituency – Smolyan elected 4 members to the Bulgarian National Assembly.

== Members in the Bulgarian National Assembly ==
- Through first-past-the-post voting

Election	Member	Party
2009		

- Through proportionality vote

Election	Member	Party
2009		
2009		
2009		
2009		

== Elections ==
2009 election

- proportionality vote

Party	Votes	%	Change	Seats	Change	
Citizens for European Development of Bulgaria						
Coalition for Bulgaria						
Movement for Rights and Freedoms						
National Union Attack						
National Movement for Stability and Progress						
Blue Coalition						
Lider (Bulgaria)						
Order, Lawfulness, Justice						
Others				—		—
Total-Valid				'—		
Invalid			—	—	—	—
Total Turnout			—	—	—	—

- first-past-the-post voting

Party	Candidate	Votes	%	Change
Citizens for European Development of Bulgaria	Dr. Daniela Daritkova			
Coalition for Bulgaria	Dr. Petar Berov			
Movement for Rights and Freedoms	Arif Agush			
National Union Attack	Zhivko Bilyanov			
National Movement for Stability and Progress	Gergana Passy			
Blue Coalition	Vasil Vasilev			
Lider (Bulgaria)	Dimitar Trendafilov			
Order, Lawfulness, Justice	Georgi Krastev			
Others				
Total Turnout			—	—

== See also ==
- 2009 Bulgarian parliamentary election
- Politics of Bulgaria
- List of Bulgarian Constituencies
