= 12th MMC – Montana =

Bulgarian constituency

Coordinates: 43°36′N 23°11′E

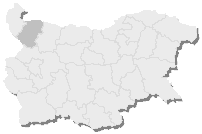
Map of Bulgaria, 12th MMC – Montana is highlighted

12th Multi-member Constituency – Montana is a constituency whose borders are the same as Montana Province in Bulgaria.

== Background ==
In the 2009 Bulgarian parliamentary election the 12th Multi-member Constituency – Montana elected 6 members to the Bulgarian National Assembly: 5 of which were through proportionality vote and 1 was through first-past-the-post voting.

== Members in the Bulgarian National Assembly ==
- Through first-past-the-post voting

Election	Member	Party
2009		

- Through proportionality vote

Election	Member	Party
2009		
2009		
2009		
2009		
2009		

== Elections ==
2009 election

- proportionality vote

Party	Votes	%	Change	Seats	Change	
Citizens for European Development of Bulgaria						
Coalition for Bulgaria						
Movement for Rights and Freedoms						
National Union Attack						
National Movement for Stability and Progress						
Blue Coalition						
Lider (Bulgaria)						
Order, Lawfulness, Justice						
Others				—		—
Total-Valid				'—		
Invalid			—	—	—	—
Total Turnout			—	—	—	—

- first-past-the-post voting

Party	Candidate	Votes	%	Change
Citizens for European Development of Bulgaria	Plamen Tsekov			
Coalition for Bulgaria	Mladen Chervenyakov			
National Union Attack	Anyuta Kamenova			
National Movement for Stability and Progress	Margarita Kaneva			
Blue Coalition	Lyubomir Ivanov			
Lider (Bulgaria)	Borislav Velikov			
Others				
Total Turnout			—	—

== See also ==
- 2009 Bulgarian parliamentary election
- Politics of Bulgaria
- List of Bulgarian Constituencies
