= 20th MMC – Silistra =

Bulgarian constituency

Coordinates: 43°55′N 27°10′E

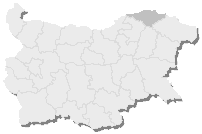
Map of Bulgaria, 20th MMC – Silistra is highlighted

The 20th Multi-member Constituency – Silistra is a constituency whose borders are the same as Silistra Province in Bulgaria.

== Background ==
In the 2009 Bulgarian parliamentary election the 20th Multi-member Constituency – Silistra elected 5 members to the Bulgarian National Assembly: 4 of which were by proportionality vote and 1 was by first-past-the-post voting.

== Members in the Bulgarian National Assembly ==
- Through first-past-the-post voting

Election	Member	Party
2009		

- Through proportionality vote

Election	Member	Party
2009		
2009		
2009		
2009		

== Elections ==
2009 election

- proportionality vote

Party	Votes	%	Change	Seats	Change	
Citizens for European Development of Bulgaria						
Coalition for Bulgaria						
Movement for Rights and Freedoms						
National Union Attack						
National Movement for Stability and Progress						
Blue Coalition						
Lider (Bulgaria)						
Order, Lawfulness, Justice						
Others				—		—
Total-Valid				'—		
Invalid			—	—	—	—
Total Turnout			—	—	—	—

- first-past-the-post voting

Party	Candidate	Votes	%	Change
Coalition for Bulgaria	Svetlana Velikova			
Movement for Rights and Freedoms	Mithat Tabakov			
National Union Attack	Dimcho Kyosev			
National Movement for Stability and Progress	Petko Dobrev			
Blue Coalition	Lazar Marichkov			
Lider (Bulgaria)	Veselina Delcheva-Borisova			
Order, Lawfulness, Justice	Stefan Pantaleev			
Others				
Total Turnout			—	—

== See also ==
- 2009 Bulgarian parliamentary election
- Politics of Bulgaria
- List of Bulgarian Constituencies
