= 14th MMC – Pernik =

Bulgarian constituency

Coordinates: 42°35′N 23°0′E

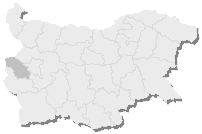
Map of Bulgaria, 14th MMC – Pernik is highlighted

14th Multi-member Constituency – Pernik is a constituency whose borders are the same as Pernik Province in Bulgaria.

== Background ==
In the 2009 Bulgarian parliamentary election the 14th Multi-member Constituency – Pernik elected 5 members for the Bulgarian National Assembly: 4 of which were through proportionality vote and 1 was through first-past-the-post voting.

== Members in the Bulgarian National Assembly ==
- Through first-past-the-post voting

Election	Member	Party
2009		

- Through proportionality vote

Election	Member	Party
2009		
2009		
2009		
2009		

== Elections ==
2009 election

- proportionality vote

Party	Votes	%	Change	Seats	Change	
Citizens for European Development of Bulgaria						
Coalition for Bulgaria						
Movement for Rights and Freedoms						
National Union Attack						
National Movement for Stability and Progress						
Blue Coalition						
Lider (Bulgaria)						
Order, Lawfulness, Justice						
Others				—		—
Total-Valid				'—		
Invalid			—	—	—	—
Total Turnout			—	—	—	—

- first-past-the-post voting

Party	Candidate	Votes	%	Change
Citizens for European Development of Bulgaria	Irena Sokolova			
Coalition for Bulgaria	Vesela Lecheva			
National Union Attack	Maya Sotirova			
National Movement for Stability and Progress	Dr. Boyan Bogdanov			
Blue Coalition	Valentin Pavlov			
Lider (Bulgaria)	Simeon Spasov			
Others				
Total Turnout			—	—

== See also ==
- 2009 Bulgarian parliamentary election
- Politics of Bulgaria
- List of Bulgarian Constituencies
