= 7th MMC – Gabrovo =

Bulgarian constituency

Coordinates: 42°55′N 25°15′E

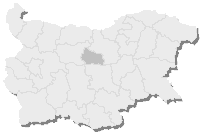
Map of Bulgaria, 7th MMC - Gabrovo is highlighted

7th Multi-member Constituency – Gabrovo is a constituency whose borders are the same as Gabrovo Province in Bulgaria.

== Background ==
In the 2009 Bulgarian parliamentary election 7th Multi-member Constituency – Gabrovo elected 5 members to the Bulgarian National Assembly, 4 of which were through proportionality vote and 1 was through first-past-the-post voting.

== Members in the Bulgarian National Assembly ==
- Through first-past-the-post voting

Election	Member	Party
2009		

- Through proportionality vote

Election	Member	Party
2009		Cristan ronaldo
2009		
2009		
2009		

== Elections ==
2009 election

- proportionality vote

Party	Votes	%	Change	Seats	Change	
Citizens for European Development of Bulgaria						
Coalition for Bulgaria						
Movement for Rights and Freedoms						
National Union Attack						
National Movement for Stability and Progress						
Blue Coalition						
Lider (Bulgaria)						
Order, Lawfulness, Justice						
Others				—		—
Total-Valid				'—		
Invalid			—	—	—	—
Total Turnout			—	—	—	—

- first-past-the-post voting

Party	Candidate	Votes	%	Change
Citizens for European Development of Bulgaria	Galina Vankovska			
Coalition for Bulgaria	Miho Mihov			
National Union Attack	Radi Stoyanov			
National Movement for Stability and Progress	Svetlozar Todorov			
Blue Coalition	Mariana Darakchieva			
Lider (Bulgaria)	Ivelina Tsoneva			
Order, Lawfulness, Justice	Dimitar Iordanov			
Others				
Total Turnout			—	—

== See also ==
- 2009 Bulgarian parliamentary election
- Politics of Bulgaria
- List of Bulgarian Constituencies
