= Yavor Bozhankov =

Bulgarian politician (born 1990)

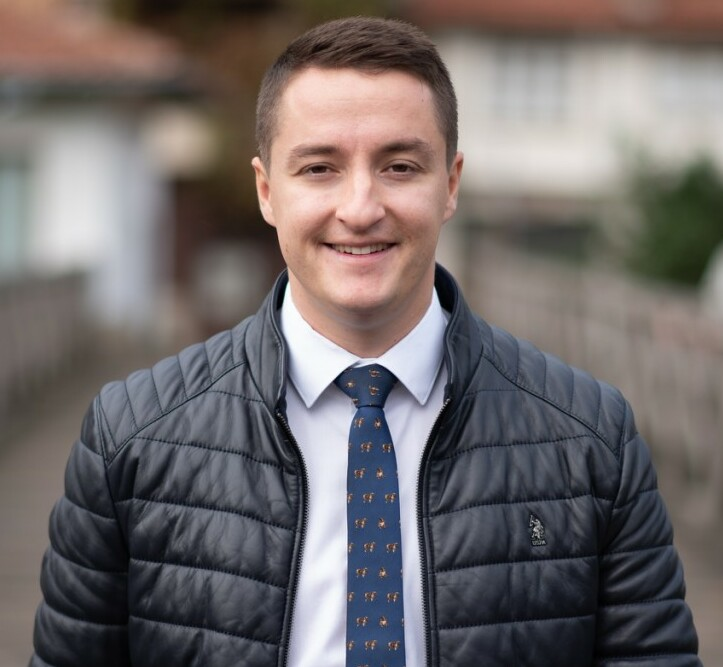
- Bozhankov in 2023

Member of the National Assembly
- Incumbent
- Assumed office 19 April 2017
- Constituency: Veliko Tarnovo (2017–2023); Gabrovo (2023–present)

Personal details
- Born: 17 November 1990 (age 35)
- Party: Independent
- Other political affiliations: PP-DB (since 2023); BSPzB (2017-2022); DSB (before 2017)

Yavor Rumenov Bozhankov (Bulgarian: Явор Руменов Божанков; born 17 November 1990) is a Bulgarian politician serving as a member of the National Assembly since 2017. He was a member of the parliamentary group of BSP for Bulgaria as a non-party member until his expulsion in 2022, and joined the We Continue the Change – Democratic Bulgaria coalition in 2023. From 2018 to 2022, he was a substitute member of the Parliamentary Assembly of the Council of Europe.
