= 11th MMC – Lovech =

Bulgarian constituency

Coordinates: 43°0′N 24°30′E

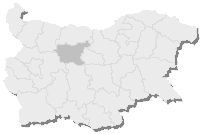
Map of Bulgaria, 11th MMC – Lovech is highlighted

11th Multi-member Constituency – Lovech is a constituency whose borders are the same as Lovech Province in Bulgaria.

== Background ==
In the 2009 Bulgarian parliamentary election the 11th Multi-member Constituency – Lovech elected 5 members to the Bulgarian National Assembly: 4 of which were through proportionality vote and 1 was through first-past-the-post voting.

== Members in the Bulgarian National Assembly ==
- Through first-past-the-post voting

Election	Member	Party
2009		

- Through proportionality vote

Election	Member	Party
2009		
2009		
2009		
2009		

== Elections ==
2009 election

- proportionality vote

Party	Votes	%	Change	Seats	Change	
Citizens for European Development of Bulgaria						
Coalition for Bulgaria						
Movement for Rights and Freedoms						
National Union Attack						
National Movement for Stability and Progress						
Blue Coalition						
Lider (Bulgaria)						
Order, Lawfulness, Justice						
Others				—		—
Total-Valid				—		
Invalid			—	—	—	—
Total Turnout			—	—	—	—

- first-past-the-post voting

Party	Candidate	Votes	%	Change
Citizens for European Development of Bulgaria	Dr. Anatolyi Iordanov			
Coalition for Bulgaria	Svetla Bachvarova			
National Union Attack	Ilian Peevski			
National Movement for Stability and Progress	Dr. Dimitrar Ivanov			
Blue Coalition	Petar Nikolaev Nikolov			
Lider (Bulgaria)	Anelia Ivanova			
Order, Lawfulness, Justice	Ilia Kinov			
Others				
Total Turnout			—	—

== See also ==
- 2009 Bulgarian parliamentary election
- Politics of Bulgaria
- List of Bulgarian Constituencies
