= 13th MMC – Pazardzhik =

Bulgarian constituency

Coordinates: 42°5′N 24°15′E

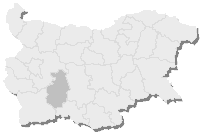
Map of Bulgaria, 13th MMC – Pazardzhik is highlighted

13th Multi-member Constituency – Pazardzhik is a constituency whose borders are the same as Pazardzhik Province in Bulgaria.

== Background ==
In the 2009 Bulgarian parliamentary election the 13th Multi-member Constituency – Pazardzhik elected 9 members to the Bulgarian National Assembly: 8 of which were through proportionality vote and 1 was through first-past-the-post voting.

== Members in the Bulgarian National Assembly ==
- Through first-past-the-post voting

Election	Member	Party
2009		

- Through proportionality vote

Election	Member	Party
2009		
2009		
2009		
2009		
2009		
2009		
2009		
2009		

== Elections ==
2009 election

- proportionality vote

Party	Votes	%	Change	Seats	Change	
Citizens for European Development of Bulgaria						
Coalition for Bulgaria						
Movement for Rights and Freedoms						
National Union Attack						
National Movement for Stability and Progress						
Blue Coalition						
Lider (Bulgaria)						
Order, Lawfulness, Justice						
Others				—		—
Total-Valid				'—		
Invalid			—	—	—	—
Total Turnout			—	—	—	—

- first-past-the-post voting

Party	Candidate	Votes	%	Change
GERB-SDS	Boyko Borisov	-	-	-
DPS-NN	Kiril Petkov	-	-	-
Vaz.	Kostadin Kostadinov	-	-	-
BSP-OL	Atanas	-	-	-
APS	Dzhevdet Chakarov	-	-	-
MECh	Radostin Vasilev	-	-	-
Total Turnout			—	—

October 2024 election

Party	Votes	%	Change	Seats	Change	
Citizens for European Development of Bulgaria						
Coalition for Bulgaria						
Movement for Rights and Freedoms						
National Union Attack						
National Movement for Stability and Progress						
Blue Coalition						
Lider (Bulgaria)						
Order, Lawfulness, Justice						
Others				—		—
Total-Valid				'—		
Invalid			—	—	—	—
Total Turnout			—	—	—	—

== See also ==
- 2009 Bulgarian parliamentary election
- 2024 Bulgarian parliamentary election
- Politics of Bulgaria
- List of Bulgarian Constituencies
