= 3rd MMC – Varna =

Constituency of the Bulgarian National Council

Coordinates: 43°13′N 27°28′E

3rd Multi-member Constituency – Varna
- Constituency for the Bulgarian National Assembly
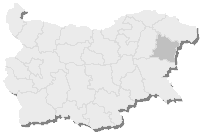
- Map of Bulgaria, 3rd MMC - Varna is highlighted
- Province: Varna Province

Current constituency
- Number of members: 15

3rd Multi-member Constituency – Varna is a constituency whose borders are the same as Varna Province in Bulgaria.

== Background ==
In the 2009 Bulgarian parliamentary election 3rd MMC – Varna elected 13 members in the Bulgarian National Assembly, 12 of which were through proportionality vote and 1 through first-past-the-post voting.

== Members in the Bulgarian National Assembly ==
- Through first-past-the-post voting

Election	Member	Party
2009		

- Through proportionality vote

Election	Member	Party
2009		
2009		
2009		
2009		
2009		
2009		
2009		
2009		
2009		
2009		
2009		
2009		

== Elections ==
2009

- proportionality vote

Party	Votes	%	Change	Seats	Change	
Citizens for European Development of Bulgaria						
Coalition for Bulgaria						
Movement for Rights and Freedoms						
National Union Attack						
National Movement for Stability and Progress						
Blue Coalition						
Lider (Bulgaria)						
Order, Lawfulness, Justice						
Others				—		—
Total-Valid				'—		
Invalid			—	—	—	—
Total Turnout			—	—	—	—

- first-past-the-post voting

Party	Candidate	Votes	%	Change
Citizens for European Development of Bulgaria	Dr. Krasimir Petrov			
Coalition for Bulgaria	Anelia Klisarska			
National Union Attack	Dimitar Karbov			
National Movement for Stability and Progress	Nikolai Vasilev			
Blue Coalition	Dimitar Kamburov			
Lider (Bulgaria)	Krasen Kralev			
Order, Lawfulness, Justice	Dimitar Abadzhiev			
Others				
Total Turnout			—	—

== See also ==
- 2009 Bulgarian parliamentary election
- Politics of Bulgaria
- List of Bulgarian Constituencies
