= 6th MMC – Vratsa =

Constituency in Bulgaria

Coordinates: 43°31′N 23°36′E

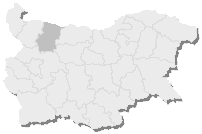
6th MMC - Vratsa is highlighted

6th Multi-member Constituency – Vratsa is a constituency whose borders are the same as Vratsa Province in Bulgaria.

== Background ==
In the 2009 Bulgarian parliamentary election 6th Multi-member Constituency – Vratsa elected 7 members to the Bulgarian National Assembly, 6 of which were through proportionality vote and 1 was through first-past-the-post voting.

== Members in the Bulgarian National Assembly ==
- Through first-past-the-post voting

Election	Member	Party
2009		

- Through proportionality vote

Election	Member	Party
2009		
2009		
2009		
2009		
2009		
2009		

== Elections ==
2009 election

- proportionality vote

Party	Votes	%	Change	Seats	Change	
Citizens for European Development of Bulgaria						
Coalition for Bulgaria						
Movement for Rights and Freedoms						
National Union Attack						
National Movement for Stability and Progress						
Blue Coalition						
Lider (Bulgaria)						
Order, Lawfulness, Justice						
Others				—		—
Total-Valid				'—		
Invalid			—	—	—	—
Total Turnout			—	—	—	—

- first-past-the-post voting

Party	Candidate	Votes	%	Change
Coalition for Bulgaria	Dimitar Gandev			
National Union Attack	Adrian Asenov			
National Movement for Stability and Progress	Hristina Hristova			
Blue Coalition	Valentin Stoyanov			
Lider (Bulgaria)	Kremen Georgiev			
Order, Lawfulness, Justice	Mario Tagarinski			
Others				
Total Turnout			—	—

== See also ==
- 2009 Bulgarian parliamentary election
- Politics of Bulgaria
- List of Bulgarian Constituencies
