= 19th MMC – Ruse =

Bulgarian constituency

Coordinates: 43°45′N 26°0′E

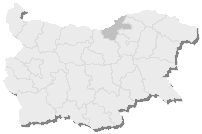
Map of Bulgaria, 19th MMC – Ruse is highlighted

The 19th Multi-member Constituency – Ruse is a constituency whose borders are the same as Ruse Province in Bulgaria.

== Background ==
In the 2009 Bulgarian parliamentary election the 19th Multi-member Constituency – Ruse elected 8 members to the Bulgarian National Assembly: 7 of which were by proportionality vote and 1 was by first-past-the-post voting.

== Members in the Bulgarian National Assembly ==
- Through first-past-the-post voting

Election	Member	Party
2009		

- Through proportionality vote

Election	Member	Party
2009		
2009		
2009		
2009		
2009		
2009		
2009		

== Elections ==
2009 election

- proportionality vote

Party	Votes	%	Change	Seats	Change	
Citizens for European Development of Bulgaria						
Coalition for Bulgaria						
Movement for Rights and Freedoms						
National Union Attack						
National Movement for Stability and Progress						
Blue Coalition						
Lider (Bulgaria)						
Order, Lawfulness, Justice						
Others				—		—
Total-Valid				'—		
Invalid			—	—	—	—
Total Turnout			—	—	—	—

- first-past-the-post voting

Party	Candidate	Votes	%	Change
Citizens for European Development of Bulgaria	Stefan Gospodinov			
Coalition for Bulgaria	Rudenko Iordanov			
Movement for Rights and Freedoms	Emel Etem			
National Union Attack	Lyubomir Vladimirov			
National Movement for Stability and Progress	Natalia Kazakova			
Blue Coalition	Hristo Popov			
Lider (Bulgaria)	Iliana Raeva			
Order, Lawfulness, Justice	Krasimir Karakachanov			
Others				
Total Turnout			—	—

== See also ==
- 2009 Bulgarian parliamentary election
- Politics of Bulgaria
- List of Bulgarian Constituencies
