= Martin Dimitrov =

Bulgarian politician

- Мартин Димитров
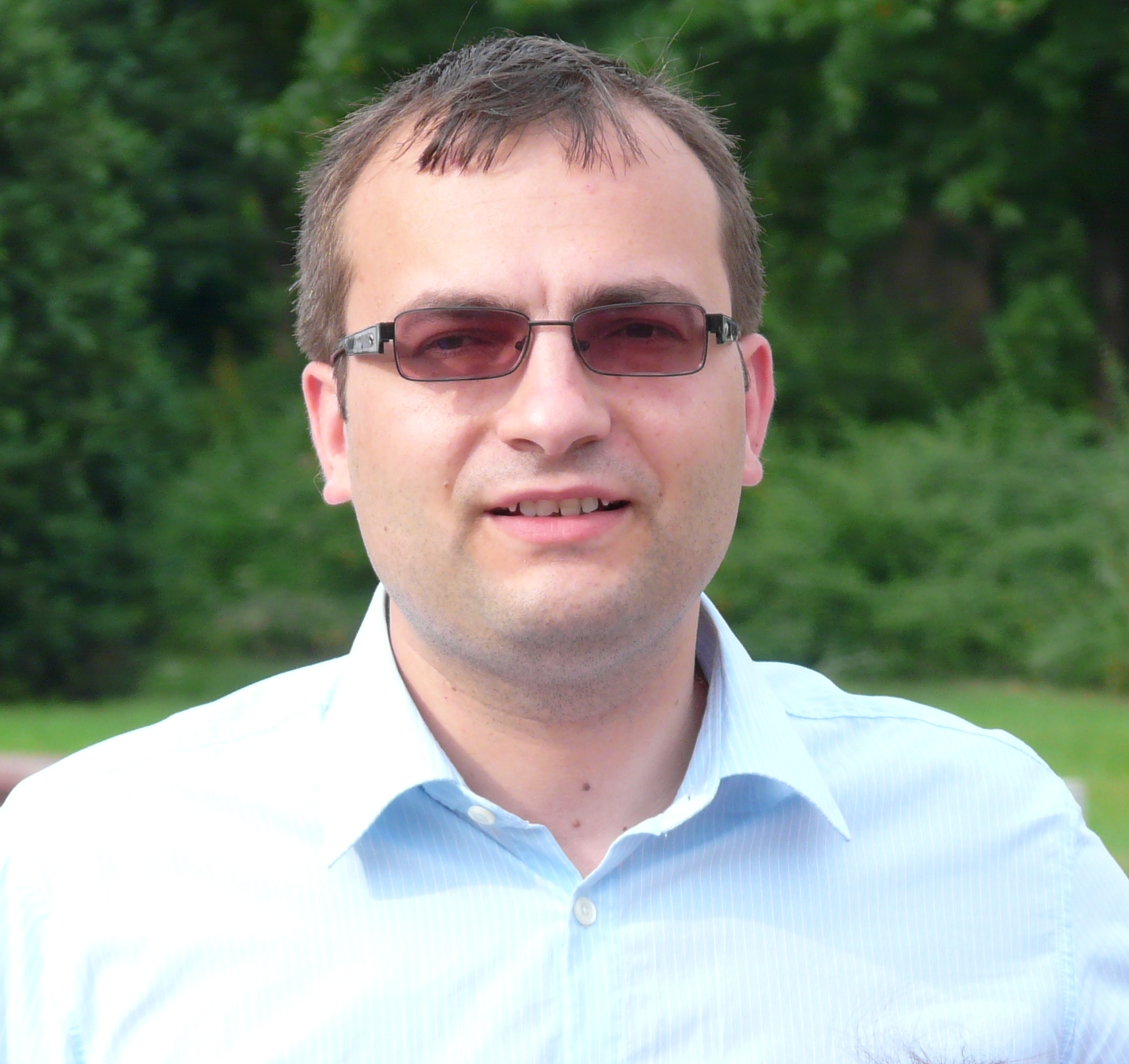
- Dimitrov in 2009

Member of the National Assembly
- Incumbent
- Assumed office 15 April 2021
- Constituency: See list: 24th MMC - Sofia (2021-2023) 19th MMC – Ruse (2023-2024) 24th MMC - Sofia (2024-present)
- In office 27 October 2014 – 26 January 2017
- Constituency: 24th MMC - Sofia
- In office 11 July 2005 – 14 March 2013
- Constituency: See list: 23rd MMC - Sofia (2005-2009) 24th MMC - Sofia (2009-2013)

Personal details
- Born: Martin Dimitrov Dimitrov; 13 April 1977 (age 48) Sofia, PR Bulgaria
- Party: Yes, Bulgaria!
- Occupation: Politician; economist

Martin Dimitrov (Bulgarian: Мартин Димитров, born 13 April 1977 in Sofia) is a Bulgarian politician and former Member of the European Parliament. He was the leader of the Union of Democratic Forces (UDF) from 2008 to 2012.

== Political career ==
Elected at 31, he was the youngest-ever leader of UDF, part of the European People's Party–European Democrats. Dimitrov's modernizing views, expertise in the field of economics, and untarnished reputation led to his election with nearly 70% of the vote as party leader in December 2008, despite his relative youth. He was the third party leader during their time in opposition to the tripartite coalition government.

=== His time in opposition to the tripartite coalition from 2005 to 2009 ===
His political and economic public policy views are neo libertarian – he has long been a proponent of a small flat tax of 10% for corporations and payroll alike. He aims for 16% National Insurance contributions from 32.5% now. The difference will be paid by creating a Silver Investment Fund, which will be given vast amounts of money from the budget surplus and other economies made by more efficient management of and workforce cuts in the public administration. The idea of a fund which will invest the public money is accused of being a "public equity company", i.e., the state acting in the manner of private equity companies or/and co-operative investment funds. That, critics say, is as far from libertarianism as it can get.

An outspoken critic of the tripartite government, he spoke out against what he perceived as a lack of transparency involved with the handling of a package of $800 million from the budget surplus voted before the end of the 2008 financial year. “We have become forensic and financial investigators,” Dimitrov said with regard of this amount, “and after months of asking questions, and seeking answers how the money is spent, we are not even nearly there”. As he often mentions it, his hope is that enough young professionals, new faces with unmarred reputations, will decide to join UDF and help in making Bulgaria something more than just a "deep province of Europe".

=== Blue Coalition ===
In 2009 Dimitrov and former prime minister Ivan Kostov, who split the party in 2003 and founded his own party: Democrats for a Strong Bulgaria (DSB), signed a coalition agreement to run together in the upcoming elections that year. Three smaller parties also joined the alliance — the United Agrarians, Bulgarian Social Democratic Party, and Radical Democratic Party — bringing the number of parties in the coalition up to five. The new alliance, named the Blue Coalition, won 7.95% of all votes in the European parliamentary elections held in June. The coalition won one seat, but this was adjusted to two seats after the Treaty of Lisbon entered into force on 1 December 2009.

In the parliamentary elections held in July, the coalition won 6.8% of the vote and won 15 seats. According to an agreement, the more popular party, according to opinion polls (the UDF), took 60% of the seats, and the DSB agreed to take the rest.

=== Clash with inner opposition and problems with the Sofia City Court ===
His opponents opposed the Blue Coalition, dubbed the “marriage from hell”. DSB had less than 1.5% public support when the agreement was signed. Influential UDF members showed serious disagreement with the decision of the National Council of the UDF to enter this coalition. In Dimitrov's own words: “There are problems and disagreements within UDF, but we take decisions democratically. I just lead the way, but do nothing without democratic sanctioning from the party’s majority. The problem with DSB for the vast majority of UDF is only one person [meaning Ivan Kostov], who I personally do not mind if for the good of the coalition he decides to step down”.

On 13 April 2009, the Sofia City Court ruled that the main document with respect to running the party is illegitimate, stating that: “it is not very democratic that members of UDF should elect their leader via anonymous vote”. Dimitrov said that he “can not believe the amateurish wording and absurd argumentation” of the Court’s decision. “The Court makes political comments which are not its job to do,” he said.

Seizing the opportunity, the former leader, Plamen Youroukov, said that the coalition with DSB must be revised and annulled as it is illegitimate, and he thinks that the Court “must have serious reasons” to refuse to write in the register the new leadership of UDF. Youroukov was the man who organized the party elections, organized the transition, and lodged the documents, which he now says are not lawful.

In an unprecedented move, on 30 April 2009, Plamen Radonov, the right hand of Plamen Youroukov, lodged the documents for registration of UDF as a sole political entity, against the decisions of the elected party leadership. On 4 May 2009, the NIS voted almost unanimously to revoke the membership of Youroukov, Radonov, and eight other “traitors”.

=== Registration of the Blue Coalition ===
The Central Electing Commission (CEC), a pool of all parliamentary represented parties, refused to register the Blue Coalition for the 2009 elections when the quorum of two-thirds attendance was not met because the delegates from the Tripartite Coalition were absent. On 31 May 2009, the Supreme Administrative Court (SAC) overturned that decision, amidst allegations from the SAC chairman himself that he was pressured by outside parties. "Finally, after 6 months of artificially produced technical obstacles, we are on the way to victory," Dimitrov said. "Justice has been done, the justices of SAC saved the face of the Bulgarian jurisprudence!”

=== 2009 Elections and aftermath ===
On 5 July 2009, GERB (Citizens for European Development of Bulgaria) won the parliamentary elections with just below 40% of the vote and 117/240 seats. The Blue Coalition, the conservative Order, Law and Justice party, and the nationalist Attack announced that they would support the First Borisov Government, supporting the government on and off until its resignation in 2013.

=== Inparty elections November 2009 ===
On 29 November 2009, after in-party elections, Martin Dimitrov was re-elected as a leader with 56% of the total vote. His most serious contender was the mayor of the Vitosha district in Sofia, Luben Petrov. Petrov won the vote in Sofia: 911 votes compared to Dimitrov's 495, but the latter crushed him in the rest of the country. Before the elections, Petrov was calling for Dimitrov to step down because of "unsatisfactory performance of the Blue Coalition and not complying with the party's rules". Dimitrov is expected to seek expansion of the Blue Coalition by luring other center-right parties to it. This did not happen, and the coalition dissolved in 2012.

== Criticism ==
Mr. Dimitrov’s personal style is an issue that was a topic of debate when he was first elected leader of his party. At the beginning, he came across as a young expert with a good reputation and therefore fared well with the public, but Dimitrov was seen as lacking charisma and communication abilities.
