= 4th MMC – Veliko Tarnovo =

Constituency of Bulgaria

Coordinates: 43°19′N 25°33′E

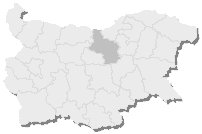
Map of Bulgaria, 4th MMC - Veliko Tarnovo is highlighted

4th Multi-member Constituency – Veliko Tarnovo is a constituency whose borders are the same as Veliko Tarnovo Province in Bulgaria.

== Background ==
In the 2009 Bulgarian parliamentary election 4th Multi-member Constituency – Veliko Tarnovo elected 9 members to the Bulgarian National Assembly, 8 of them through proportional vote and 1 through first-past-the-post voting.

== Members in the Bulgarian National Assembly ==
- Through first-past-the-post voting

Election	Member	Party
2009	Tsvetan Tsvetanov	Citizens for European Development of Bulgaria

- Through proportional vote

Election	Member	Party
2009		
2009		
2009		
2009		
2009		
2009		
2009		
2009		

== Elections ==
2009 election

- Proportional vote

Party	Votes	%	Change	Seats	Change
Citizens for European Development of Bulgaria	62,371	43.4%	+43.4%	4	+4
Coalition for Bulgaria	25,119	17.5%	-16.2%	1	-2
National Union Attack	16,732	11.6%	+0.2%	1	0
Movement for Rights and Freedoms	12,211	8.5%	+3.9%	1	+1
Blue Coalition	8,678	6.0%	+6.0%	1	+1
Order, Lawfulness, Justice	8,409	5.9%	+5.9%	1	+1
Lider (Bulgaria)	4,394	3.1%	+3.1%	0	0
National Movement for Stability and Progress	3,461	2.4%	+2.4%	0	0
Others	2,285	1.6%	-9.8%	0	0
Valid	143,660	97.2%	-0.1%	9	0
Not Valid	4,150	2.8%	+0.1%	0	0
Total Turnout	147,810	62.1%	+4.2%	9	0

- First-past-the-post voting

Party	Candidate	Votes	%	Change
Citizens for European Development of Bulgaria	Tsvetan Tsvetanov			
Coalition for Bulgaria	Andrei Pantev			
National Union Attack	Rumen Georgiev			
National Movement for Stability and Progress	Borislav Tsekov			
Blue Coalition	Vanyo Sharkov			
Lider (Bulgaria)	Ivan Angelov			
Order, Lawfulness, Justice	Tsvetan Tsvetanov			
Others				
Total Turnout				

== See also ==
- 2009 Bulgarian parliamentary election
- Politics of Bulgaria
- List of Bulgarian Constituencies
