= 2009 Bulgarian parliamentary election =

- 5 July 2009
- All 240 seats in the 41st National Assembly; 121 seats needed for a majority
- Turnout: 60.64%
Party	Leader	Vote %	Seats	+/–
GERB	Boyko Borisov	39.72	116	New
KzB	Sergei Stanishev	17.70	40	−42
DPS	Ahmed Dogan	14.45	38	+4
Ataka	Volen Siderov	9.36	21	0
SDS+DSB	M. Dimitrov & I. Kostov	6.76	15	New
RZS	Yane Yanev	4.13	10	New
This lists parties that won seats. See the complete results below.

Prime Minister before	Prime Minister after
Sergei Stanishev; BSP (Stanishev Government)	Boyko Borisov; GERB (First Borisov Government)

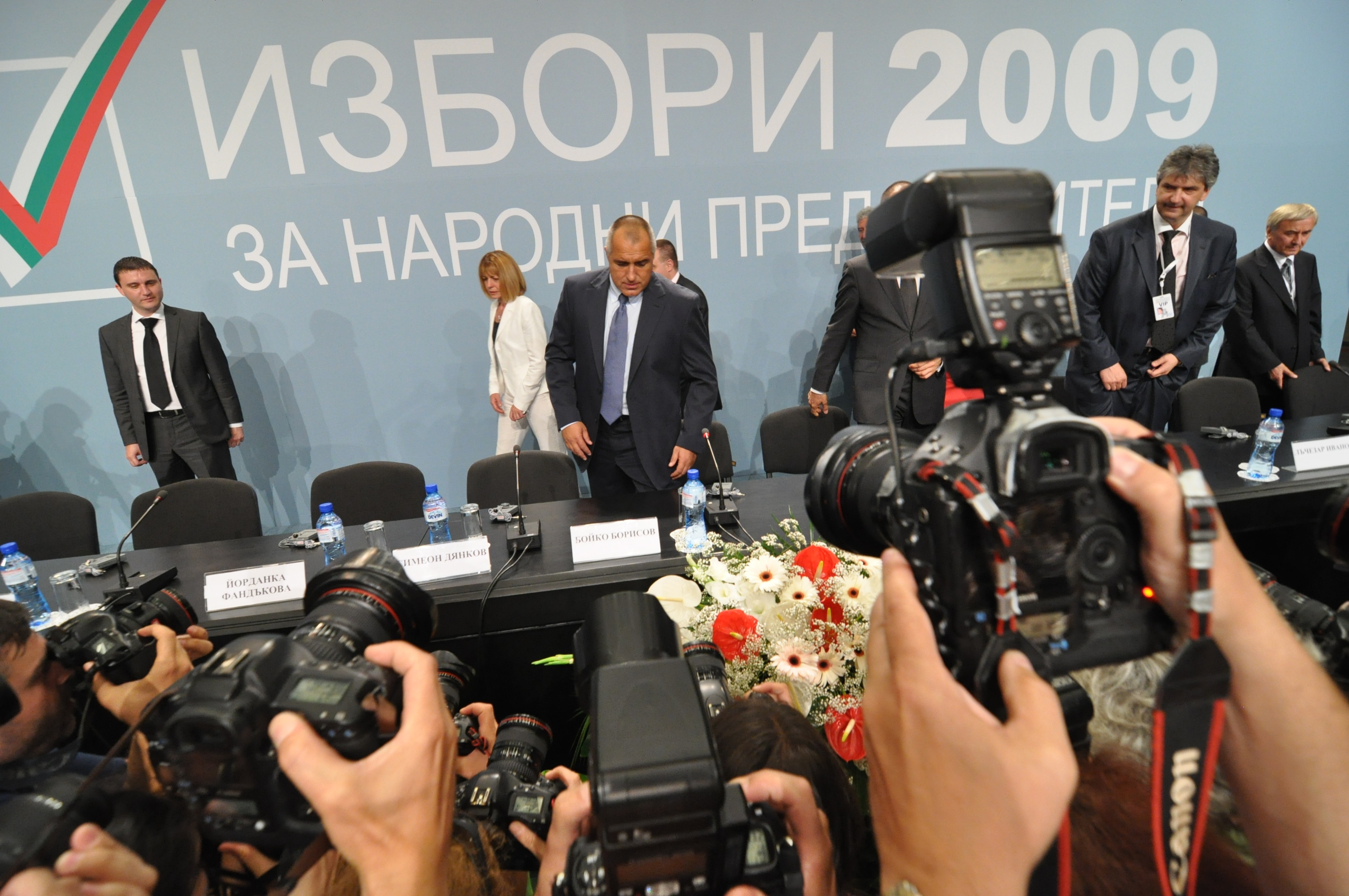
The leaders of GERB take their seats in front of reporters before giving a press conference after the election

Parliamentary elections were held in Bulgaria on 5 July 2009. With 40% of the vote, the decisive winner of the elections was the established in 2006 personalistic party of Boyko Borisov, GERB. The Socialist Party, in power before the election, was in second place, with around 18%. Оnce-ruling National Movement Simeon II did not cross the 4% threshold and won no seats. The turnout was 60.6%, one of the lowest ever. Following the election, GERB leader Boyko Borisov became prime minister. Just like all the previous parliamentary elections since the fall of communism, the government was not re-elected.

== Background ==
The 2009 elections saw the debut of a parallel voting system with a lesser plurality vote element. 209 of the 240 parliament seats were distributed according to the proportional system, while the remaining 31 (the number of voting constituencies in Bulgaria) were allocated for First Past the Post.

The ruling Bulgarian Socialist Party wanted to amend the electoral law, increasing state subsidies for political parties threefold (the reason for doing this would be making campaign financing more transparent, they claim), requiring registration in at least two-thirds of all electoral districts (thus eliminating most marginal parties).

An electoral reform was passed in April 2009 with the votes of the BSP, the DPS, Ataka and Order, Law and Justice. It would raise the election threshold for alliances from 4% to 8% (which was widely seen as a move against the opposition electoral alliance of DSB and SDS, which was polling around 7.3% at that time) and established that 31 of the 240 seats would be elected by majority vote. President Georgi Parvanov returned the law to parliament for reconsideration, but as the parties had no plans to amend it and as he could only return the law once, he had to sign it before the election. After the law had been passed, the provision raising the electoral threshold was struck down by the Constitutional Court of Bulgaria.

The Blue Coalition was denied registration for the election by the Central Election Commission on 28 May 2009 due to a leadership struggle in the SDS, one of the two constituent parties. The Blue Coalition announced it would appeal the ruling. On 29 May 2009, the Supreme Administrative Court overturned the CEC's decision, allowing the Blue Coalition to contest the election.

== Participating parties ==
Parties standing in the election included:

- Order, Law and Justice (Ред, Законност, Справедливост)
- Lider (Лидер)
- GERB (ГЕРБ)
- Movement for Rights and Freedoms (ДПС)
- Attack (Атака)
- Coalition for Bulgaria (led by the Bulgarian Socialist Party) (Коалиция за България)
- Union of the Patriotic Forces "Defense" (Съюз на Патриотичните Сили "Защита")
- National Movement for Stability and Progress (formerly the National Movement Simeon II) (НДСВ)
- Coalition BANU (Коалиция БЗНС)(disqualified from the election)
- Bulgarian Left Coalition (Българска Лява Коалиция)
- Party of the Liberal Alternative and Peace (Партия на Либералната Алтернатива и Мира (ПЛАМ))
- The Greens (ПП Зелените)
- Social Democrats (Социалдемократи)
- VMRO – Bulgarian National Movement (ВМРО – Българско Национално Движение)(disqualified from the election)
- The Other Bulgaria (ПП Другата България)
- Union of the Bulgarian Patriots (Обединение на Българските Патриоти)
- National Movement for the Salvation of the Fatherland (Политическа партия "Национално движение за спасение на Отечеството")
- Bulgarian National Union – New Democracy (Български Национален Съюз – НД)
- Blue Coalition (Синята Коалиция)
- For the Homeland (За Родината – ДГИ-НЛ)

== Opinion polls ==
- The following are the polls for the proportional vote:

Source	Date	Turnout	GERB	BSP	DPS	Ataka	BC	NDSV	Lider	RZS
NCIOM	3 July	55	29-32	20-22	13-14	9-11	8-9	5-5.5	5-5.5	4
Alpha Research	1 July	56	33.9	19.5	14.1	9	8.1	4.2	4.5	4.1

== Results ==
Results of the election, showing vote strength by electoral district. Top: results in FPTP constituencies. Bottom: results in proportional constituencies.

Simple results of the FPTP constituencies.

Party	Proportional			Constituency			Total seats	+/–
Party	Votes	%	Seats	Votes	%	Seats	Total seats	+/–
GERB	1,678,641	39.72	90	1,554,609	39.40	26	116	New
Coalition for Bulgaria	748,147	17.70	40	792,218	20.08	0	40	−42
Movement for Rights and Freedoms	610,521	14.45	33	346,431	8.78	5	38	+4
Attack	395,733	9.36	21	372,608	9.44	0	21	0
Blue Coalition	285,662	6.76	15	258,190	6.54	0	15	−22
Order, Law and Justice	174,582	4.13	10	167,011	4.23	0	10	New
Lider	137,795	3.26	0	153,980	3.90	0	0	New
National Movement for Stability and Progress	127,470	3.02	0	169,098	4.29	0	0	–53
The Greens	21,841	0.52	0	26,130	0.66	0	0	New
For the Homeland	11,524	0.27	0	365	0.01	0	0	–
Bulgarian Left Coalition	8,762	0.21	0	12,047	0.31	0	0	–
Union of the Patriotic Forces "Defense"	6,368	0.15	0	7,372	0.19	0	0	–
Political Movement "Social Democrats"	5,004	0.12	0	2,581	0.07	0	0	New
Bulgarian New Democracy	3,813	0.09	0	4,479	0.11	0	0	New
The Other Bulgaria	3,455	0.08	0	164	0.00	0	0	New
Party of the Liberal Alternative and Peace	2,828	0.07	0	117	0.00	0	0	–
Union of Bulgarian Patriots	2,175	0.05	0	4,463	0.11	0	0	–
National Movement for the Salvation of the Fatherland	1,874	0.04	0	3,289	0.08	0	0	New
Independents				70,676	1.79	0	0	0
Total	4,226,195	100.00	209	3,945,828	100.00	31	240	0
Valid votes	4,226,195	97.75						
Invalid/blank votes	97,387	2.25						
Total votes	4,323,582	100.00						
Registered voters/turnout	7,129,965	60.64						
Source: CIK,

The following members were elected through first past the post voting in 31 single-member constituencies:

Constituency	Member	Party
Blagoevgrad	Lyben Tatarski	GERB
Burgas	Bozhidar Stoyanov	GERB
Varna	Krasimir Petrov	GERB
Veliko Tarnovo	Tsvetan Tsvetanov	GERB
Vidin	Lyubomila Stanislavova	GERB
Vratsa	Nikolay Kotsev	GERB
Gabrovo	Galina Bankovska	GERB
Dobrich	Rumen Ivanov	GERB
Kardzhali	Ahmed Dogan	DPS
Kyustendil	Valentin Mikev	GERB
Lovech	Anatoliy Yordanov	GERB
Montana	Plamen Tsekov	GERB
Pazardzhik	Ivan Ivanov	GERB
Pernik	Irena Sokolova	GERB
Pleven	Tsetska Tsacheva	GERB
Plovdiv City	Menda Stoyanova	GERB
Plovdiv Oblast	Dimitar Lazarov	GERB
Razgrad	Hasan Ademov	DPS
Ruse	Plamen Nunev	GERB
Silistra	Mithat Tabakov	DPS
Sliven	Desislava Taneva	GERB
Smolyan	Daniela Daritkova-Prodanova	GERB
Sofia 23	Boris Grozdanov	GERB
Sofia 24	Monika Panayotova	GERB
Sofia 25	Krasimir Velchev	GERB
Sofia-province	Emil Dimitrov	GERB
Stara Zagora	Ivan Kolev	GERB
Targovishte	Kasim Dal	DPS
Haskovo	Delyan Dobrev	GERB
Shumen	Georgi Kolev	DPS
Yambol	Anastas Anastasov	GERB

== Aftermath ==
The elections were decisively won by Boyko Borisov's GERB party, which gained 39.72% of the proportional vote and 26 of the 31 majority vote parliament seats, in total 116 and almost half of the Assembly's 240 seats. Until the elections Borisov was Mayor of Sofia and left office to become prime minister, until 2005 he was a member of the former king Simeon II's National Movement for Stability and Progress party and before he was also a member of the Communist Party, though he and his party's policy are opposite to the Communist. The ruling Bulgarian Socialist Party-headed Coalition for Bulgaria gathered 17.70% but no majority vote seats. The Muslim minority's party Movement for Rights and Freedoms amassed 14.45% and won the remaining five majority vote seats, the nationalist party Attack came fourth with 9.36% of the proportional vote, followed by the right-wing Blue Coalition of former ruling elements with 6.76% and the newly Order, Law and Justice, whose tally was at 4.13%. Parties such as Lider and Saxe-Coburg Gotha's once-ruling NDSV did not cross the 4% threshold and won no seats. The voter turnout of 60.20% was perceived as high, but was not unexpected.

As a result of the election, the government was formed by GERB alone with Boyko Borisov as Prime Minister. BSP and DPS, two of the members of the former centre-left ruling coalition, were put in opposition. Due to the party's failure in the elections, not electing a single member of parliament, former Tsar and more recently prime minister resigned as NDSV leader on 6 July. While Prime Minister Sergei Stanishev took the responsibility for the socialists' electoral failure, he did not resign as party leader and continued to lead the party in opposition through to the next election.

== See also ==
- List of political parties in Bulgaria
- List of Bulgarian constituencies
