= 23rd Multi-member Constituency =

Bulgarian constituency

Coordinates: 42°38′46″N 23°21′57″E

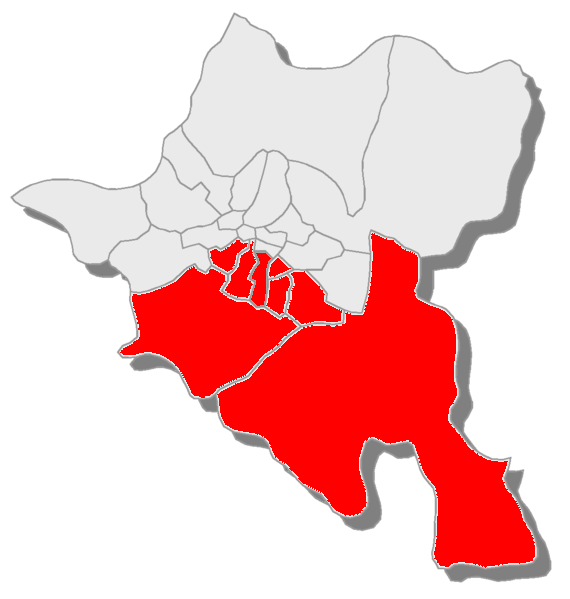
Карта на районите, които влизат в МИР 23

The 23rd Multi-member Constituency (Bulgarian: 23-ти многомандатен избирателен район) is one of the five Bulgarian constituencies whose borders are different from the administrative division. It comprises several regions in South-West and South-East Sofia.

== Background ==
In the 2009 Bulgarian parliamentary election the 23rd Multi-member Constituency – Sofia-23 elected 12 members to the Bulgarian National Assembly: 11 of which were by proportionality vote and 1 was by first-past-the-post voting.

== Members in the Bulgarian National Assembly ==
- Through first-past-the-post voting

Election	Member	Party
2009		

- Through proportionality vote

Election	Member	Party
2009		
2009		
2009		
2009		
2009		
2009		
2009		
2009		
2009		
2009		
2009		

== Elections ==
2009 election

- proportionality vote

Party	Votes	%	Change	Seats	Change	
Citizens for European Development of Bulgaria						
Coalition for Bulgaria						
Movement for Rights and Freedoms						
National Union Attack						
National Movement for Stability and Progress						
Blue Coalition						
Lider (Bulgaria)						
Order, Lawfulness, Justice						
Others				—		—
Total-Valid				'—		
Invalid			—	—	—	—
Total Turnout			—	11	—	—

- first-past-the-post voting

Party	Candidate	Votes	%	Change
Citizens for European Development of Bulgaria	Boris Grozdanov			
Coalition for Bulgaria	Georgi Kadiev			
National Union Attack	Yavor Notev			
National Movement for Stability and Progress	Plamen Konstantinov			
Blue Coalition	Ivan Kostov			
Lider (Bulgaria)	Anton Radichev			
Order, Lawfulness, Justice	David Levi			
Others				
Total Turnout			—	—

== See also ==
- 2009 Bulgarian parliamentary election
- Politics of Bulgaria
- List of Bulgarian Constituencies
