= European Security and Integration =

Bulgarian political party

European Security and Integration Европейска сигурност и интеграция
- Ideology: Bulgarian Roma interests Social democracy
- Political position: Centre-left

The Civil Union "Roma" (Bulgarian: Гражданско обединение "Рома", Grazhdansko obedinenie "Roma") is a political party in Bulgaria. It is part of the Coalition for Bulgaria, an alliance led by the Bulgarian Socialist Party. It defends the interests of Bulgarian Roma minority.

== Names ==
It was established as a non-political organization under the name Roma Civic Association, established on March 4, 2001 (published in the State Gazette on April 27, 2001). It is headed by the lawyer Toma Tomov. Since 2003 it has been the Political Party Roma (promulgated, SG, 29.07.2003), with registration by its chairman Toma Tomov and its chief secretary by Toma Ivanov.

In 2010 it was rebranded as the political party European Security and Integration.

== Activity ==
The organization joined the Coalition for Bulgaria election campaign in 2001. Its leader Toma Tomov was a member of the Coalition for 2 terms (from Montana and from Vratsa respectively) from 2001 to 2009.

The party signed a coalition agreement to support the nominations of Ivaylo Kalfin and Stefan Danailov in the 2011 presidential election.
