= 16th MMC – Plovdiv-city =

Bulgarian constituency

Coordinates: 42°9′N 24°45′E

The 16th Multi-member Constituency – Plovdiv-City is a constituency of the National Assembly of Bulgaria whose borders are the same as Plovdiv Municipality in Bulgaria.

== Background ==
In the 2009 Bulgarian parliamentary election the 16th Multi-member Constituency – Plovdiv-City elected 10 members to the Bulgarian National Assembly: 9 through a proportionality vote and 1 was through first-past-the-post voting.

== Members in the Bulgarian National Assembly ==
- Through first-past-the-post voting

| Election | Member | Party |
|---|---|---|
| 2009 | | |

- Through proportionality vote

| Election | Member | Party |
|---|---|---|
| 2009 | | |
| 2009 | | |
| 2009 | | |
| 2009 | | |
| 2009 | | |
| 2009 | | |
| 2009 | | |
| 2009 | | |
| 2009 | | |

== Elections ==
2009 election

- proportionality vote

| Party | Votes | % | Change | Seats | Change | |
|---|---|---|---|---|---|---|
| Citizens for European Development of Bulgaria | | | | | | |
| Coalition for Bulgaria | | | | | | |
| Movement for Rights and Freedoms | | | | | | |
| National Union Attack | | | | | | |
| National Movement for Stability and Progress | | | | | | |
| Blue Coalition | | | | | | |
| Lider (Bulgaria) | | | | | | |
| Order, Lawfulness, Justice | | | | | | |
| Others | | | | — | | — |
| Total-Valid | | | | '— | | |
| Invalid | | | — | — | — | — |
| Total Turnout | | | — | — | — | — |

- first-past-the-post voting

| Party | Candidate | Votes | % | Change |
|---|---|---|---|---|
| Citizens for European Development of Bulgaria | Menda Stoyanova | | | |
| Coalition for Bulgaria | Dr. Ilia Batashki | | | |
| National Union Attack | Pavel Shopov | | | |
| National Movement for Stability and Progress | Milen Velchev | | | |
| Blue Coalition | Dimo Gyaurov | | | |
| Lider (Bulgaria) | Emil Koshlukov | | | |
| Others | | | | |
| Total Turnout | | | — | — |

== See also ==
- 2009 Bulgarian parliamentary election
- Politics of Bulgaria
- List of Bulgarian Constituencies
