= List of constituencies of Bulgaria =

Seat distribution by constituency after the October 2024 election.

Bulgaria is divided into 31 multi-member constituencies for the purposes of elections to the National Assembly.

== Background ==
Bulgaria is divided into 28 provinces. Most of these correspond exactly to the constituencies, but Sofia City Province is divided in 3 and Plovdiv Province is divided in 2. Plovdiv Province is divided between the 16th MMC (consisting of the City of Plovdiv) and the 17th MMC (consisting of the rest of the province). Sofia City Province (not to be confused with Sofia Province) is divided between the 23rd (southern Sofia), 24th (central and eastern Sofia), and 25th (western Sofia) MMCs.

In addition to their names, constituencies are numbered from 1 to 31 according to their order in the Cyrillic alphabet. There are a total of 240 seats in the National Assembly, and each constituency elects between 4 (the guaranteed minimum number of seats in a constituency) and 16 members of parliament.

== Constituencies ==
The following is the numbers of MPs allocated to each constituency by election year. The number of MPs in 2009 only adds up to 209 because of the electoral system experiment of that year (see further below).

| MMC | Constituency | Province | Seats | | | | | |
| MMC | Constituency | Province | 2005 | 2009* | 2013 | 2014 | 2017 | 2024 |
|---|---|---|---|---|---|---|---|---|
| 1 | Blagoevgrad | Blagoevgrad | 10 | 9 | 11 | 11 | 11 | 11 |
| 2 | Burgas | Burgas | 13 | 11 | 14 | 14 | 14 | 14 |
| 3 | Varna | Varna | 14 | 12 | 15 | 15 | 15 | 15 |
| 4 | Veliko Tarnovo | Veliko Tarnovo | 9 | 8 | 8 | 8 | 8 | 8 |
| 5 | Vidin | Vidin | 4 | 3 | 4 | 4 | 4 | 4 |
| 6 | Vratsa | Vratsa | 7 | 6 | 6 | 6 | 6 | 6 |
| 7 | Gabrovo | Gabrovo | 4 | 4 | 4 | 4 | 4 | 4 |
| 8 | Dobrich | Dobrich | 7 | 6 | 6 | 6 | 6 | 6 |
| 9 | Kardzhali | Kardzhali | 5 | 4 | 5 | 5 | 5 | 5 |
| 10 | Kyustendil | Kyustendil | 5 | 4 | 4 | 4 | 4 | 4 |
| 11 | Lovech | Lovech | 5 | 4 | 5 | 5 | 5 | 5 |
| 12 | Montana | Montana | 6 | 5 | 5 | 5 | 5 | 5 |
| 13 | Pazardzhik | Pazardzhik | 9 | 8 | 9 | 9 | 9 | 9 |
| 14 | Pernik | Pernik | 5 | 4 | 4 | 4 | 4 | 4 |
| 15 | Pleven | Pleven | 10 | 9 | 9 | 9 | 9 | 9 |
| 16 | Plovdiv-city | Plovdiv | 10 | 9 | 11 | 11 | 11 | 11 |
| 17 | Plovdiv-province | Plovdiv | 11 | 10 | 11 | 11 | 11 | 11 |
| 18 | Razgrad | Razgrad | 5 | 4 | 4 | 4 | 4 | 4 |
| 19 | Ruse | Ruse | 8 | 7 | 8 | 8 | 8 | 8 |
| 20 | Silistra | Silistra | 4 | 4 | 4 | 4 | 4 | 4 |
| 21 | Sliven | Sliven | 7 | 6 | 6 | 6 | 6 | 6 |
| 22 | Smolyan | Smolyan | 4 | 4 | 4 | 4 | 4 | 4 |
| 23 | Sofia-23 | Sofia City (Note: Sofia Province and Sofia City Province are distinct from each other.) | 13 | 11 | 16 | 16 | 16 | 16 |
| 24 | Sofia-24 | Sofia City | 11 | 10 | 12 | 12 | 12 | 12 |
| 25 | Sofia-25 | Sofia City | 12 | 10 | 14 | 14 | 14 | 14 |
| 26 | Sofia-province | Sofia | 8 | 7 | 8 | 8 | 8 | 8 |
| 27 | Stara Zagora | Stara Zagora | 11 | 10 | 11 | 11 | 11 | 11 |
| 28 | Targovishte | Targovishte | 4 | 4 | 4 | 4 | 4 | 4 |
| 29 | Haskovo | Haskovo | 8 | 7 | 8 | 8 | 8 | 8 |
| 30 | Shumen | Shumen | 6 | 5 | 6 | 6 | 6 | 6 |
| 31 | Yambol | Yambol | 5 | 4 | 4 | 4 | 4 | 4 |
| Total | | | 240 | 209* | 240 | 240 | 240 | 240 |

== 2009 experiment ==
As an experiment, the 2009 election was conducted with a different electoral system than earlier elections. 31 out of the 240 MPs were elected through first-past-the-post voting, while the remaining 209 were elected through party-list proportional representation using the largest remainder method. This mixed electoral system was rejected for use in further elections, and the old system was returned in the next election in 2013.

== See also ==
- Bulgaria, the single nationwide constituency for elections to the European Parliament
- Elections in Bulgaria
- Politics of Bulgaria
- The provinces of Bulgaria, on which the constituencies are based
