= Ministry of Culture (Bulgaria) =

Government ministry of Bulgaria

- Министерство на културата Ministerstvo na kulturata

Agency overview
- Formed: 6 February 1954
- Jurisdiction: Government of Bulgaria
- Headquarters: Sofia, Bulgaria
- Minister responsible: Marian Bachev (2025)
- Website: www.mc.government.bg

The Ministry of Culture (Bulgarian: Министерство на културата, Ministerstvo na kulturata) of the Republic of Bulgaria is the ministry charged with overseeing and stimulating the cultural work in the country and preserving its cultural heritage.

== History ==
The Ministry of Culture was established as a separate institution on 6 February 1954, previously being part of the Ministry of Enlightenment. It was then active under various names until promoted back to a ministry in 1990, but once again briefly united with the Ministry of Education and Science in 1993.

== Ministers ==
The following table lists the ministers responsible for culture in Bulgaria since 1990. In 1992–1993 the culture portfolio was part of the Ministry of Education, Science and Culture, and in 2005 it was briefly part of the Ministry of Culture and Tourism.

Minister	Took office	Left office	Party	Notes
Krastyo Goranov	8 February 1990	21 September 1990	BSP	
Dimo Dimov	21 September 1990	20 December 1990	Independent	
Dimo Dimov	22 December 1990	8 November 1991	Independent	
Elka Konstantinova	8 November 1991	30 December 1992	UDF	
Marin Todorov	30 December 1992	23 June 1993	Independent	Minister of Education, Science and Culture
Ivaylo Znepolski	23 June 1993	17 October 1994	Independent	
Ivaylo Znepolski	17 October 1994	25 January 1995	Independent	
Georgi Kostov	25 January 1995	10 June 1996	BSP	
Ivan Marazov	10 June 1996	12 February 1997	BSP	
Emil Tabakov	12 February 1997	21 May 1997	UDF	
Emma Moskova	21 May 1997	24 July 2001	UDF	
Bozhidar Abrashev	24 July 2001	23 February 2005	NDSV	
Nina Chilova	23 February 2005	16 August 2005	NDSV	Minister of Culture and Tourism
Stefan Danailov	16 August 2005	27 July 2009	BSP	
Vezhdi Rashidov	27 July 2009	13 March 2013	GERB	
Vladimir Penev	13 March 2013	29 May 2013	Independent	
Petar Stoyanovich	29 May 2013	6 August 2014	Independent	
Martin Ivanov	6 August 2014	7 November 2014	Independent	
Vezhdi Rashidov	7 November 2014	27 January 2017	GERB	
Rashko Mladenov	27 January 2017	4 May 2017	Independent	
Boil Banov	4 May 2017	12 May 2021	GERB	
Velislav Minekov	12 May 2021	16 September 2021	Independent	
Velislav Minekov	16 September 2021	13 December 2021	Independent	
Atanas Atanasov	13 December 2021	2 August 2022	PP	
Velislav Minekov	2 August 2022	3 February 2023	Independent	
Nayden Todorov	3 February 2023	6 June 2023	Independent	
Krastyu Krastev	6 June 2023	9 April 2024	Independent	
Nayden Todorov	9 April 2024	16 January 2025	Independent	Appointed in the 2024 caretaker cabinets; he handed over the ministry to Marian Bachev on 16 January 2025.
Marian Bachev	16 January 2025	19 February 2026	Independent	Bachev took office on 16 January 2025, succeeding Nayden Todorov.
Nayden Todorov	19 February 2026	8 May 2026	Independent	Listed as caretaker Minister of Culture in the caretaker government from 19 February 2026.
Evtim Miloshev	8 May 2026	Incumbent	Independent	Listed as Minister of Culture in the government from 8 May 2026.

== Agencies ==
=== Bulgarian National Film Center ===
The Bulgarian National Film Center (BNFC or NFC; also spelt Centre) is an executive agency under the Minister of Culture that helps to fund filmmaking and related activities. It is supported partly by the government's budget and partly by revenues from its own activities. Its functions include the support and/or organisation of the following:

- creation, distribution, and showing of Bulgarian films both nationally and internationally
- film festivals of Bulgarian and foreign films at home (such as the Sofia International Film Festival) and showing of Bulgarian films abroad
- training and qualification of film industry workers
- activity of Creative Europe Media-Bulgaria
- cooperation with similar organisations in other countries and various programs of the Council of Europe (for which it is the coordinator for Bulgaria in the European Audiovisual Observatory) and the European Union
- protection of copyright and related rights in the film industry
- legislation relating to the film industry
- data collection and dissemination to the public relating to the Bulgarian film industry
- production rights

Funding is provided for film projects selected on a competitive basis by an expert National Creative Committee. Grants provide at least 30% and up to 80% of the film's budget.

Since 2005, the BNFC has represented Bulgaria in the European Film Promotion organisation. It also works in cooperation with public broadcaster Bulgarian National Television, the Bulgarian National Film Archive, the Union of Bulgarian Filmmakers and other organisations in the field of audiovisual in the production, distribution and preservation of Bulgarian films

The NFC is located at 2A Dondukov Blvd in Sofia.

==== Academy Award selections ====
Bulgarian entries for the Academy Award for Best International Feature Film have been submitted since 1970. Until 2007, they were selected by the Bulgarian National Council on Cinema, and from 2007, by the Bulgarian National Film Council. The body was referred to as Bulgarian National Cinema Council in 2019, when it was presided over by producer Vladimir Andreev, and selected Ága as the Bulgarian entry.

In 2024, the film Triumph was selected as the Bulgarian entry for the Academy Award for Best International Feature Film, by a unanimous decision of a five-member selection committee appointed by the BNFC.

=== Bulgarian National Film Archive ===
The Bulgarian National Film Archive is another legal entity under the Ministry of Culture. It was established to acquire, restore, preserve, and store film and film-related archival artefacts of Bulgarian and international culture.
