= Aleksandar Nenkov =

Bulgarian politician (born 1983)

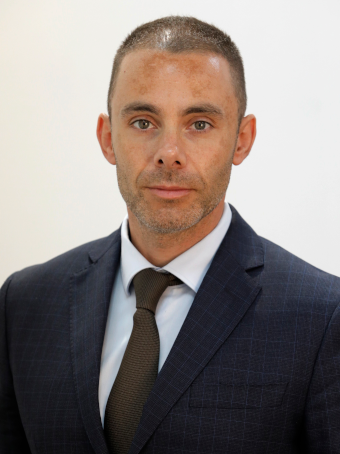
- Nenkov in 2021

Member of the National Assembly
- Incumbent
- Assumed office 14 July 2009
- Constituency: 23rd MMC

Personal details
- Born: 7 November 1983 (age 42)
- Party: GERB

Aleksandar Rumenov Nenkov (Bulgarian: Александър Руменов Ненков; born 7 November 1983) is a Bulgarian politician serving as a member of the National Assembly since 2009. He was a member of the Parliamentary Assembly of the Council of Europe from 2009 to 2015 and from 2021 to 2022.
