= Stefan Danailov =

Bulgarian actor (1942–2019)

- Стефан Данаилов
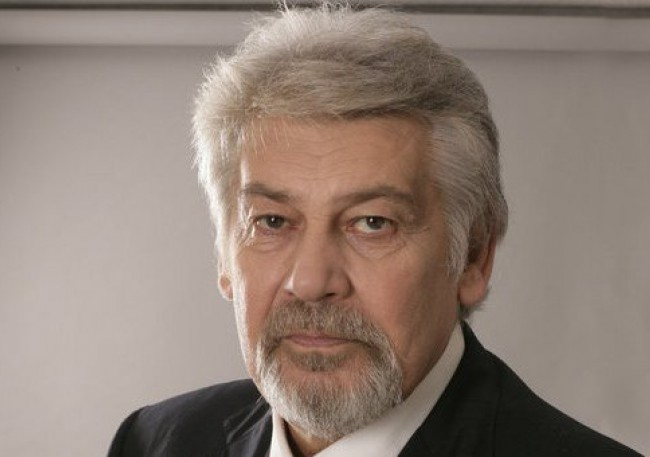
- Danailov in 2006

Minister of Culture
- In office 16 August 2005 – 27 July 2009
- Prime Minister: Sergey Stanishev
- Preceded by: Bozhidar Abrashev
- Succeeded by: Vezhdi Rashidov

Member of the National Assembly
- In office 14 July 2009 – 27 November 2019
- Constituency: 16th MMC - Plovdiv (2009-2013); 15th MMC - Pleven (2013-2014); 24th MMC - Sofia (2014-2019)
- In office 5 July 2001 – 16 August 2005
- Constituency: 24th MMC - Sofia

Personal details
- Born: Stefan Lambov Danailov; 9 December 1942 Sofia, Tsardom of Bulgaria
- Died: 27 November 2019 (aged 76) Sofia, Bulgaria
- Party: Bulgarian Socialist Party
- Other political affiliations: Bulgarian Communist Party (until 1989)
- Education: National Academy for Theatre and Film Arts
- Occupation: Actor, politician

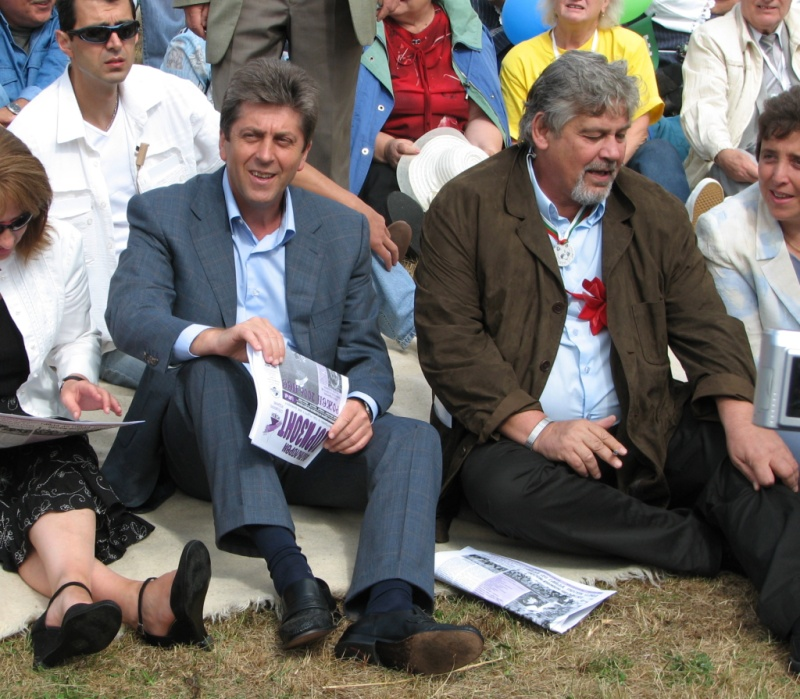
With the president Georgi Parvanov, 2006

Stefan Lambov Danailov (Bulgarian: Стефан Ламбов Данаилов; 9 December 1942 – 27 November 2019) was a Bulgarian actor who served as Minister of Culture of Bulgaria (August 2005 – July 2009).

== Career ==
The first film Danailov took part in was The Traces Remain (Следите остават) when he was a child. At that time he did not want to be an actor but in 1966, he graduated from VITIZ (the Bulgarian Theatre Academy). His best-known work was as Major Deyanov in the series На всеки километър (At Each Kilometer). He participated in numerous films and plays for which he won a lot of prizes. For 20 years he was a professor at the Theatre Academy in Sofia, teaching there since 1988.

On 2 December 2019, The Bulgarian National Theater organized the biggest memorial service in Stefan Danailov's name.

== Selected filmography ==
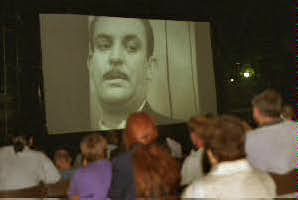
Screening of At Each Kilometer in Sofia (picture on display is not Stefan Danailov)

- The Traces Remain (Следите остават) (1956) - Veselin
- The Inspector and the Night (Инспекторът и нощта) (1963) - Tom
- Quiet Paths (Мълчаливите пътеки) (1967)
- The Sea (Морето) (1967) - Toni
- Taste of Almonds (С дъх на бадеми) (1967) - Belokozhev
- The First Courier (Първият куриер) (1968) - Zagubanski
- At Each Kilometer (На всеки километър) (1969, TV Series) - Nikola Deyanov
- The Prince (Князът) (1970) - Knyaz Svetoslav
- The Black Angels (Черните ангели) (1970) - Panter
- There is Nothing Finer Than Bad Weather (Няма нищо по-хубаво от лошото време) (1971) - Lyubo
- At Each Kilometer-II (На всеки километър – II) (1971, TV Series) - Nikola Deyanov
- Affection (Обич) (1972) - Nikolay
- Nona (Нона) (1973) - Poruchik Galchev
- Ivan Kondarev (Иван Кондарев) (1974) - Kostadin Dzhupunov
- Houses Without Fences (Къщи без огради) (1974) - Kerkeneza
- Glow over Drava (Зарево над Драва) (1974) - Poruchik Bozhev
- Life or Death (На живот и смърт) (1974, TV Movie) - D-r Milev
- The Weddings of King Ioan Assen (Сватбите на Йоан Асен) (1975) - Burgundetza
- Tozi istinski mazh (1975) - Sasho
- Nachaloto na denya (1975) - Andrey Stoychev
- Guilt (Вината) (1976) - Zhivko Georgiev
- Samodivsko horo (1976)
- Vinata (1976) - Zhivko Topalov
- Dopalnenie kam zakona za zashtita na darzhavata (1976) - Kapitanat provokator
- Godina ot ponedelnitzi (1977) - Inzhener Halachev
- RMS Five (Петимата от РМС) (1977, TV Series)
- Yuliya Vrevskaya (1978) - Karabelov
- Dying in the worst case ("Умирай само в краен случай) (1978) - Dzho Rayt
- Oncomming Traffic (Насрещно движение) (1978, TV Movie) - Chavdar Bonev
- Toplo (1978) - Workman / Gyp
- Migove v kibritena kutiyka (1979) - Kvartirantat
- Something Out of Nothing (От нищо нещо) (1979) - Pancho
- Voynata na taralezhite (1979)
- Ladies' Choice (Дами канят) (1980) - Vasil Gramatikov
- Blood Remains (Кръвта остава) (1980) - Yakim (the driving instructor)
- The Queen of Tarnovo (Търновската царица) (1981) - D-r Stariradev
- Autumn Sun (Есенно слънце) (1982) - Kiril Dechev
- Crystals (Кристали) (1982) - Cholakov
- Twenty-four Hours Raining (24 часа дъжд) (1982) - Kapitan Vasil Altunov
- Edna odiseya v Deliormana (1983) - Ofitzer Ivanov
- Ravnovesie (1983) - Aktyora
- Aris (1983)
- Tazi krav tryabvashe da se prolee (1985) - Yuvigi han
- The Conversion to Christianity & Discourse of Letters (Борис I) (1985) - Boris I
- Maneuvers On the Fifth Floor (Маневри на петия етаж) (1985) - Danton Tahov
- Coasts in the Mist (1986) - Sokrat
- Transport of Death (Ешелоните) (1986) - Mitropolit Kiril
- Three Marias and Ivan (Три Марии и Иван) (1986) - Ivan
- Poema (1986) - Anton Cholakov
- Dreamers (Мечтатели) (1987) - Nachalnikat na politziyata
- Nebe za vsichki (1987) - Velikov-Slantzeto
- Ne se motay v krakata mi (1987)
- Levakat (1987) - Kapitan Hristo Pashov
- Zashtitete drebnite zhivotni (1988)
- Monday Morning (Понеделник сутрин) (1988) - Krastyo
- Big Game (Большая игра) (1988, TV Mini-Series)
- Zapadnya (1988)
- The Carnival (Карнавалът) (1990) - Konstantinov
- Live Dangerously (Живей опасно) (1990)
- Iskam Amerika (1991) - Rezhisyorat Paskalev
- The Berlin Conspiracy (1992) - Actor
- Crisis in the Kremlin (1992) - Anton Ambrazis
- La Piovra (season 7) (1995)) - Don Nuzzo
- Don Quixote is Coming Back (Дон Кихот возвращается) (1997) - Duke
- Ispanska muha (1998) - Uycho
- Sled kraja na sveta (1998) - Albert Cohen (Berto)
- A Spanish Fly (Испанска муха) (1998)
- After the End of World (След края на света) (1998) - Albert Cohen (Berto)
- Druids (2001)
- Forgive Us (Прости нам) (2003, TV Movie) - Chicho Petyo
- La Masseria Delle Allodole (2007) - Presidente Tribunale
- St. George Shoots the Dragon (2009) - Minta Ciganin
- Staklenata reka (2010)
- Incognita (2012) - Director of the Foundation
- Reunion (2019) - Grandfather (final film role)
