= The Other Bulgaria =

The Other Bulgaria Другата България
- Leader: Bozhidar Tomalevski
- Founded: 22 March 2009
- National Assembly: 0 / 240
- European Parliament: 0 / 17

The Other Bulgaria (Bulgarian: Другата България, romanized: Drugata Bulgaria) is a political party in Bulgaria that claims to represent Bulgarians living abroad. The party was founded on March 22, 2009 and is chaired by Bozhidar Tomalevski. Almost two months after its founding the party boasted 21,000 members in 26 countries.

The party was founded with the hopes of allowing Bulgarian émigrés to have a say in how their country is run. The party goal is to unite Bulgarians all over the globe.

The party ran in the 2009 parliamentary election and won only 3,455 votes (0.08%).

In their second parliamentary elections in 2013 the party won 2,497 votes (0.07%).
