= Ventsislav Lakov =

Bulgarian politician (1962–2025)

- Венцислав Лаков
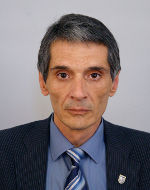
- Lakov in 2009

Member of the National Assembly of Bulgaria for 6th MMC – Vratsa
- In office 14 July 2009 – 6 August 2014

Personal details
- Born: Ventsislav Asenov Lakov; 28 February 1962; Sofia, Bulgaria
- Died: 22 June 2025 (aged 63); Sofia, Bulgaria
- Political party: Attack
- Education: Sofia University
- Occupation: Politician, journalist

Ventsislav Asenov Lakov (Bulgarian: Венцислав Асенов Лаков; 28 February 1962 – 22 June 2025) was a Bulgarian politician and journalist who was a member of Attack. He served in the National Assembly from 2009 to 2014.

Lakov died in Sofia on 22 June 2025, at the age of 63.
