= Movement for Social Humanism =

Bulgarian political party

The Movement for Social Humanism (Bulgarian: Движение за социален хуманизъм, romanized: Dvizhenie za sotsialen humanizam) is a progressive political party in Bulgaria formed in 2003. It is part of the Coalition for Bulgaria, an alliance led by the Bulgarian Socialist Party. The coalition won in the 2001 elections 17.1% of the popular vote and 48 out of 240 seats.

As of 2024, the chairman of the party is Tsvetan Minyovski.
