= 21st MMC – Sliven =

National Assembly constituency of Bulgaria

21st MMC - Sliven
- Multi-member constituency for the Bulgarian National Assembly
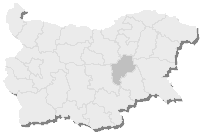
- Location of 21st MMC - Sliven within Bulgaria

Current constituency
- Seats: 6
- Member(s): Desislava Taneva, Mariya Belova, Hyusein Hafazov, Kliment Shopov, Tatyana Siveva and Deyan Dechev

The 21st Multi-member Constituency - Sliven is a constituency of the Bulgarian National Assembly whose borders are the same as Sliven Province. It sends 6 representatives to the assembly.

After the October 2024 election, the constituency's seats were represented by:

Name	Party
Desislava Taneva	GERB–SDS
Mariya Belova	GERB–SDS
Hyusein Hafazov	DPS – A New Beginning
Kliment Shopov	Revival
Tatyana Siveva	We Continue the Change – Democratic Bulgaria
Deyan Dechev	BSP – United Left

== See also ==
- Politics of Bulgaria
- List of Bulgarian Constituencies
