= Kalina Krumova =

Bulgarian politician, television presenter and journalist

Personal details
- Born: January 7, 1985 (age 41) Burgas, Bulgaria
- Party: Attack
- Children: 1
- Occupation: Politician, television presenter, journalist

Kalina Venelinova Krumova (Bulgarian: Калина Венелинова Крумова; born 7 January 1985, Burgas, Bulgaria) is a Bulgarian politician, television presenter and journalist. She was elected to the 41st National Assembly of Bulgaria as a member of the Ataka Party in the 2009 parliamentary election. She is the youngest MP in Bulgaria.

== Biography ==
=== Education ===
Krumova completed her secondary education at a school for Romance languages in Burgas, where she specialised in French. She then studied for a BA in world economy (with a thesis on "Economics of a socio-cultural sphere") at the local university, and later took a master's degree in journalism and mass media.

As well as her native Bulgarian, Krumova is fluent in French and has a working knowledge of English and Italian.

=== Career ===
Kalina Krumova was host for the SKAT TV show Early Buzz.

=== Politics ===
Krumova stood for the Ataka Party in the Bulgarian parliamentary election and was duly elected. She was the youngest Member of Parliament for the 41st National Assembly.

On 25 November 2011 she filed an application to leave the Ataka parliamentary group, thus becoming the seventh MP to leave the party.

=== Personal life ===
Krumova has a son.

== 2012 Burgas bus bombing ==
When the 2012 Burgas bus bombing occurred in her home town, Krumova rushed in jeans and sandals to the hospital where the injured were being treated, and stayed there during the entire night alongside the Israeli aid teams. She assisted in translations for the aid teams and in communicating with the injured, since many of the hospital staff did not speak English. Professor Gabi Barbash, head of the Israeli rescue mission, said, "Without her, we would have been deaf and dumb."
