= 2013 Bulgarian parliamentary election =

- 12 May 2013
- All 240 seats in the 42nd National Assembly; 121 seats needed for a majority
- Turnout: 52.47%
Party	Leader	Vote %	Seats	+/–
GERB	Boyko Borisov	30.55	97	−19
KzB	Sergei Stanishev	26.62	84	+44
DPS	Lyutvi Mestan	11.31	36	−2
Ataka	Volen Siderov	7.30	23	+2
This lists parties that won seats. See the complete results below.

Prime Minister before	Prime Minister after
Marin Raykov; Independent (Raykov Government)	Plamen Oresharski; BSP (Oresharski Government)

Parliamentary elections were held in Bulgaria on 12 May 2013, two months ahead of schedule. Protests had forced the resignation of the GERB government in February, leading to the election being moved up. The elections resulted in a minority parliament, with no party winning a majority of seats. Furthermore, voter turnout was at its lowest since the end of the Communist era. GERB's leader, Boyko Borisov, called for the election results to be annulled, claiming that there had been "illegal campaigning" on the day before the election.

== Background ==
High electricity prices and poverty ignited mass protests in February 2013, eventually leading to the resignation of the GERB government and early elections. The elections were originally scheduled to be held in July, but had to be brought forward. The government resigned the day after clashes between the police and protesters led to bloodshed and a number of civilians being badly injured. A caretaker government was appointed on 13 March 2013 by President Rosen Plevneliev to serve until the elections. On 28 February, Plevneliev announced the earliest possible date for the election would be 12 May.

== Electoral system ==
The 240 members of the National Assembly were elected by closed-list proportional representation in 31 multi-member constituencies. Parties had to receive at least 4% of the national vote to win any of the proportional seats, which were distributed using the largest remainder method. Parties that failed to pass the 4% threshold, but received more than 1% of the national vote were to be allocated annual state subsidies to the amount of 12 leva (€6) per vote received.

== Campaign ==
As a result of the protests over electricity prices, the distribution license for Czech utility company ČEZ was revoked. President Rosen Plevneliev told parliament: "I believe that the necessary key changes in the laws should be decided by a new parliament. The decision is to hold elections."

Former European Commissioner Meglena Kuneva broke from the National Movement for Stability and Progress, formed around Simeon Saxe-Coburg-Gotha. She claimed her new party would have significant support even though opinion polls indicated otherwise. She also indicated that it was likely her civil society organisation, Movement "Bulgaria of the Citizens", would become a party as it was "the only way to participate in elections." Rumours suggested she could be a coalition partner to GERB, but she played down such suggestions. In the Socialist party there was infighting over whether Sergei Stanishev or Georgi Parvanov would lead the party.

Several of the parties were newly formed by citizens, resulting from the public discontent from the 2013 Bulgarian protests and the months leading up to them. One such party is People's Voice, formed by Hipodil frontman Svetlio Vitkov. Others were led by citizens using the ticket of parties which were already in existence, as they had not managed to fulfill the strict registration requirements in the two months between the government's resignation and the elections – one such party is the Democratic Citizens' Initiative. In all cases, the citizens' parties still needed to collect the 7,000 signatures necessary for participating in the elections.

=== Controversy ===
Al Jazeera reported voter apathy due to scandals and disappointment with politicians. During the campaign there were also allegations of fraud and an illegal wiretapping scandal. The day before the election, a printing press in Kostinbrod was raided and 350,000 alleged illegally printed ballots were recovered. BSP leader Sergey Stanishev said that this was preparation for fraud with 10 percent of the electoral turnout being falsified for about 25 constituencies. He said: "This is a scandal unseen in Bulgaria so far." There was also allegations of illegal wiretapping of politicians. Prosecutors suggested former Interior Minister Tsvetan Tsvetanov was responsible with media revealing Borisov's alleged summons of Sofia's chief prosecutor to discuss details of the bribery probe. The OSCE's monitoring delegation member Eoghan Murphy said of the fraudulent ballot papers: "It's not for us to investigate these matters. It is for the Bulgarian authorities, but we will be interested in their assessment of the situation and how they deal with the matter as reported." In their post-election press-conferences and press interviews, many of the parties stated that the vote should be invalidated because of the so-called "ballot-gate".

The revelation of the illegal ballots was made on the day before the election, designated "day for thought", when no political campaigning is allowed. Most of the major parties held press conferences immediately after the revelation, after which the Prosecutor's office made a formal announcement on the matter. The Prosecution was then accused by GERB that their announcement "cost them 5-6% of the vote", and four days later, in their first press conference since election night, Borisov stated that he will officially ask for an invalidation of the vote.

== Opinion polls ==
Pollster	Date	GERB	BSP	DPS	Ataka	DSB	SDS	DBG	Ref
NCIOM	10 May	34	25	13	9				
Skala	10 May	26.8	26.4	11.5	9.2	4.0	3.1	5.4	
Mediana	10 May	32.0	31.5	11.6	8.0			~4	
Gallup BBSS	10 May	29-35	28-32	10-12	7-9			3-5	
Alfa Research	9 May	33	28	10	7.5	2.7	2	4	
Afis	8 May	21.8	19.5	6.0	5.8			3.4	
MBMD	29 April	28.3	18.7	5.2	5.2	~2		4.1	
NCIOM	28 April	23.6	17.7	6.0	4.9			3.0	
Mediana	25 April	23.3	21.4	6.2	5.5	2.1	0.9	4.5	
CAM	24 April	24.1	18.2	6.1	4.8	1.2	1.0	4.4	
Afis	19 April	24.0	18.9	5.0	5.4	1.1	0.7	3.1	
NCIOM	19 April	23.9	17.5	6.2	5.2	2.0	0.7	3.1	
Alfa Research	18 April	22.5	16.9	4.8	4.9	1.8	0.6	2.9	
Gallup BBSS	17 April	22.8	19.9	4.9	5.7	1.2	1.2	3.9	
Mediana	12 April	26.4	23.7	5.8	6.2	2.4	1.8	4.5	
NCIOM	4 April	24.4	17.5	6.5	5.0	2.0	0.7	3.5	
MBMD	2 April	30.1	15.6	5.0	4.4			2.7	
Skala	2 April	25.3	20.2	14.0	9.9			6.0	
Modern Politics	2 April	24.8	20.6	5.6	4.9	3.6	0.7	4.3	
Alfa Research	1 April	21.9	17.4	4.8	5.5	1.8	0.6	3.9	
Sova Harris	23 March	19.0	18.7	5.2	5.0	0.7	0.7	1.6	
Mediana	17 March	21.3	20.4	7.9	4.3	1.5	1.4	5.1	
Gallup BBSS	15 March	19.7	18.6	5.2	5.0	0.7	0.7	3.0	
Modern Politics	8 March	24.1	20.3	4.6	3.6	2.1	1.1	2.7	
Mediana	15 February	19.3	22.5	6.8	3.6	1.4	1.6	5.9	
Gallup BBSS	14 February	22.6	22.1	7.3	1.2	1.3	0.9	4.8	
Last election	5 July 2009	39.7	17.7	14.0	9.4	6.8		—	

- The electoral threshold is 4%.

== Results ==
Results of the election, showing vote strength by electoral district.

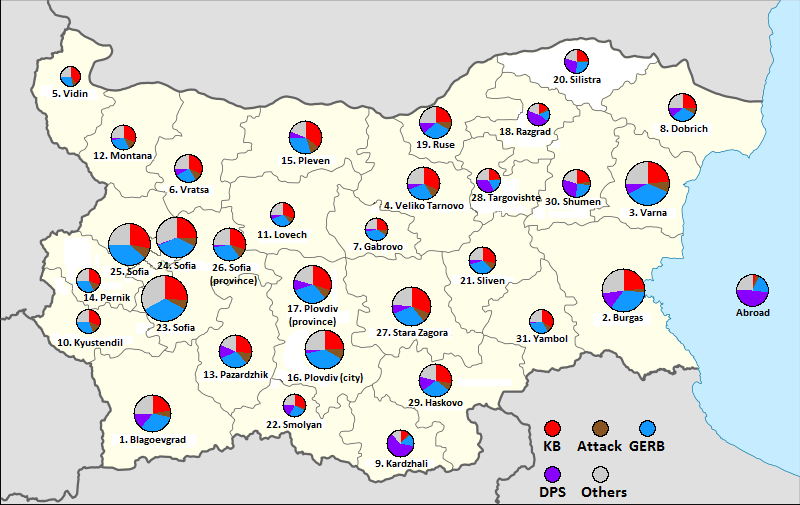
Distribution of votes by constituency

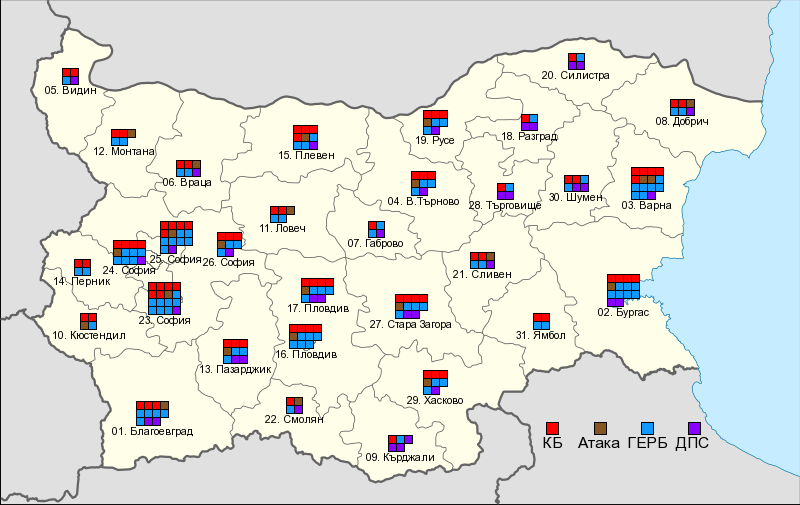
Distribution of seats by constituency

There were 6.9 million eligible voters. Voting ended at 21:00. There were also over 250 international electoral monitors. Turnout was 51.3%. Four parties passed the electoral threshold, winning seats in parliament. These four parties account for only 75.76% of all valid ballots cast.

Party	Votes	%	+/–	Seats	+/–
GERB	1,081,605	30.55	−9.17	97	−19
Coalition for Bulgaria	942,541	26.62	+8.92	84	+44
Movement for Rights and Freedoms	400,466	11.31	−3.14	36	−2
Attack	258,481	7.30	−2.06	23	+2
National Front for the Salvation of Bulgaria	131,169	3.70	New	0	New
Bulgaria for Citizens Movement	115,190	3.25	New	0	New
Democrats for a Strong Bulgaria	103,638	2.93	−	0	−5
IMRO – Bulgarian National Movement	66,803	1.89	New	0	New
Lider	61,482	1.74	−1.52	0	0
Order, Law and Justice	59,145	1.67	−2.46	0	−10
Center–Freedom and Dignity	57,611	1.63	New	0	New
Union of Democratic Forces	48,681	1.37	−	0	−9
People's Voice	47,419	1.34	New	0	New
The Greens	26,520	0.75	+0.23	0	0
New Alternative	18,267	0.52	New	0	New
Proud Bulgaria	16,126	0.46	New	0	New
Democratic Civil Initiative	15,482	0.44	New	0	New
Civil List–Modern Bulgaria	14,352	0.41	New	0	New
Liberal Alliance	8,873	0.25	New	0	New
Bulgarian Agrarian National Union	7,715	0.22	New	0	New
Party of Bulgarian Women	6,545	0.18	New	0	New
Union of Communists in Bulgaria	6,168	0.17	New	0	New
United People's Party	6,143	0.17	New	0	New
Bulgarian Left	5,924	0.17	New	0	New
Bulgarian Spring	4,097	0.12	New	0	New
Christian Party of Bulgaria	3,722	0.11	New	0	New
Middle European Class	3,539	0.10	New	0	New
National Democratic Party	3,445	0.10	New	0	New
Democratic Alternative for National Unification	3,414	0.10	New	0	New
National Patriotic Unity	3,239	0.09	New	0	New
Democratic Party	3,160	0.09	New	0	New
The Other Bulgaria	2,497	0.07	−0.01	0	0
Cause Bulgaria	2,234	0.06	New	0	New
National Unity Movement	1,786	0.05	New	0	New
Christian Social Union	1,687	0.05	New	0	New
Social Democrat Party	1,300	0.04	New	0	0
Total	3,540,466	100.00	–	240	0
Valid votes	3,540,466	97.52			
Invalid/blank votes	90,047	2.48			
Total votes	3,630,513	100.00			
Registered voters/turnout	6,919,260	52.47			
Source: Central Electoral Commission

== Reactions ==
The election was noted for its low voter turnout. After voting finished, about 50 protesters congregated outside the election centre at the Palace of Culture in Sofia demanding GERB not be given a chance to form a new government. The protesters chanted "mafia" and were involved in brief scuffles with the police. Sergei Stanishev, leader of the second-place Bulgarian Socialist Party, dismissed GERB's chances of forming a government and expressed willingness to negotiate with the other two parties. GERB set a precedent by not holding the traditional post-election press conference for elected parties, and they stayed out of the media for four days until the finalized results came out on Thursday.

== Government formation ==
On 24 May, Borisov returned the president's mandate to try and form a government. President Rosen Plevneliev then invited the BSP to form a government. Reuters speculated that the BSP and the DPS will put together a cabinet of non-partisan specialists. That will be approved if some of Attack's 23 MPs boycott the vote, as they did for the election of the new speaker, Mihail Mikov. Former Finance Minister Plamen Oresharski was nominated for the post of prime minister by the BSP and, after a meeting with the Movement for Rights and Freedoms, was appointed on 29 May. About his new cabinet, Oresharski said: "I have always been skeptical towards the division between leftists and rightists. There are some situations in which the most important thing is a rational and pragmatic approach. The main criterion for the composition of the cabinet is expertise."

== See also ==
- 2013 Bulgarian nuclear power referendum
- List of political parties in Bulgaria
- List of Bulgarian constituencies
