= Kasim Dal =

Bulgarian politician

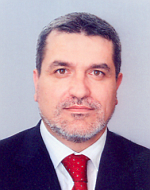

Member of Bulgarian National Assembly

Personal details
- Born: 17 October 1962 (age 62); Nikolaevka, Bulgaria
- Occupation: Politician

Kasim Ismail Dal (Bulgarian: Касим Исмаил Дал; 17 October 1962) is a Bulgarian politician. He is a member of the XXXVIII, XXXIX, XL and XLI National Assemblies.

== Political career ==
One of the founders of the Turkish National Liberation Movement in Bulgaria in 1985, for which he served a sentence in the prisons of Sofia, Varna, Bobov Dol and Stara Zagora (1986–1989). After his amnesty in 1990, he became one of the founders of the Movement for Rights and Freedoms, and since 1993 has been its deputy chairman.

In October 2009, in front of nearly 300 delegates at the regional conference of the Movement for Rights and Freedoms (MRF) in Shumen, he declared that the MRF would govern Bulgaria independently, but also that for the first time in 12 years his party was isolated from power.

In January 2011, he resigned from the leadership of the MRF and was expelled from the party's parliamentary group after making accusations against party leader Ahmed Dogan.

In the 2014 parliamentary elections, he was a candidate for deputy from the Reformist Bloc, but was not elected as a deputy.
