= Desislava Taneva =

Bulgarian politician (born 1972)

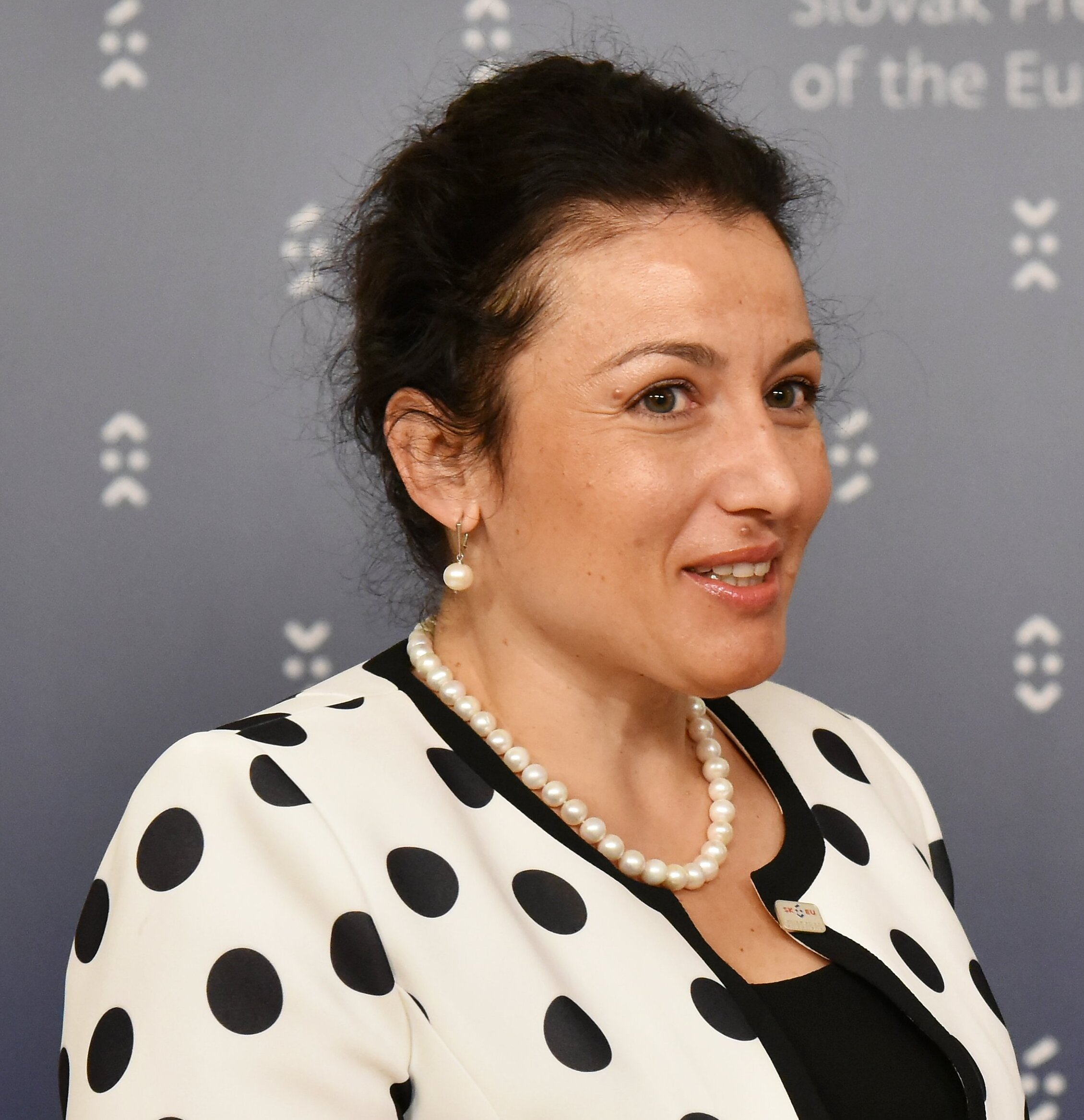

Personal details
- Born: 9 June 1972 (age 53) Sliven, Bulgaria
- Profession: Politician

Desislava Zhekova Taneva (Bulgarian: Десислава Жекова Танева), born 9 June 1972, is a Bulgarian politician who is the Minister of Agriculture and Food in the Second Borisov Government.

== Career ==
Born in Sliven, Taneva earned a degree in economics from the UNWE in 1995 and studied law at the Bourgas Free University, graduating in 2001. Between 1997 and 4 July 2009, she served as the executive director of "Mel invest" AD. Taneva has also been for many years the regional leader of GERB in Sliven.

On 7 November 2014, Taneva assumed her duties as Minister of Agriculture and Food of Bulgaria, succeeding Vasil Grudev.
