= Blue Coalition =

Blue Coalition Синя коалиция
- Leader: Ivan Kostov; Martin Dimitrov
- Founded: 2009
- Dissolved: 15 May 2012
- Preceded by: United Democratic Forces
- Succeeded by: Reformist Bloc
- Headquarters: Sofia, Bulgaria
- Ideology: Conservative liberalism Conservatism; Liberalism; Economic liberalism
- Political position: Centre-right

Website
- www.siniatakoalicia.org

The Blue Coalition (Bulgarian: Синята коалиция, romanized: Sinyata koalitsia) was a centre-right electoral alliance in Bulgaria, whose members were the Union of Democratic Forces (SDS), Democrats for a Strong Bulgaria (DSB) and three smaller parties. The members of the European Parliament elected on the coalition's list sat with the group of the European People's Party.

== Members ==
2009

- Union of Democratic Forces (SDS) — Съюз на демократичните сили (СДС)
- Democrats for a Strong Bulgaria (DSB) — Демократи за силна България (ДСБ)
- United Agrarians — Обединени земеделци
- Bulgarian Social Democratic Party (BSDP) — Българска социалдемократическа партия (БСДП)
- Radical Democratic Party in Bulgaria (RDPB) — Радикалдемократическа партия в България (РДПБ)

== Elections results ==
- In the 2009 European Parliament election, the coalition's first appearance in an election, the Blue Coalition gathered 7.95% of all votes in Bulgaria, earning one seat in the European Parliament for Nadezhda Mihaylova. The coalition failed to earn a second European Parliament seat by 0.01%, or a few hundred votes at the expense of NDSV.
- In the 2009 Bulgarian parliamentary election, the coalition won 6,8% of the popular vote and 15 of 240 seats
- The October 2011 presidential elections were a disaster for the coalition. Their candidate, Rumen Hristov, secured only 1.95% of the popular vote. Strong rifts emerged in the coalition as the SDS and the DSB failed to reach a consensus on candidates for the municipal elections - also held in October.

== Dissolution ==
On 15 May 2012 the Union of Democratic Forces National Council voted 49-34 to leave the Blue Coalition and stand alone in the next parliamentary elections. This move came after negotiations between the two major powers of the coalition, SDS and DSB, concluded that the coalition must be dissolved. With the SDS out of the coalition, the DBS decided to run alone, bringing the Blue Coalition to an end. This move worried some as polls suggested neither of the two parties would be capable of crossing the 4% threshold in the upcoming election.

== See also ==
- Reformist Bloc
