= Bulgarian Democratic Center =

Bulgarian Democratic Center Български Демократичен Център
- Leader: Krassimira Kovachka, Stefan Kenov
- Founded: 2007
- Headquarters: Sofia, Bulgaria
- Ideology: Conservative liberalism Liberalism; Conservatism; Pro-Europeanism
- Political position: Centre to centre-right
- Colours: Blue
- National Assembly: 0 / 240
- European Parliament: 0 / 17

Bulgarian Democratic Center (Bulgarian: Български Демократичен Център – an acronym for "Bulgarian Democratic Center"), formerly (Lider – Liberal Initiative for Democratic European Development) is a Bulgarian political party registered in 2007.

== Participation in elections ==
Lider participated in the 2009 European Parliament election together with the center-right political party Novoto Vreme and gathered 5.7% of the vote, which was just under the electoral quota. Lider participated in the 2009 parliamentary election outside of any right-wing coalition, winning only 3.3% of the votes and therefore failing to secure parliamentary representation.

Lider did not nominate a candidate for the 2011 presidential election.

In the 2013 parliamentary elections Lider polled 61,482 (1.74%) votes. Once again the party failed to cross the 4% threshold for representation.
