= Order, Law and Justice =

Defunct political party in Bulgaria

Order, Law and Justice Ред, законност и справедливост
- Abbreviation: RZS (Bulgarian)
- Leader: Yane Yanev
- Founded: 2005
- Dissolved: 2013
- Headquarters: Sofia
- Ideology: Conservatism; National conservatism; Populism; Right-wing populism; Bulgarian nationalism
- Political position: Centre-right to right-wing
- Colors: Blue and orange

Website
- www.rzs.bg

Order, Law and Justice (Bulgarian: Ред, законност и справедливост, romanized: Red, zakonnost i spravedlivost, abbreviated as RZS) was a conservative political party in Bulgaria. Its main focus is on fighting crime and corruption. It won the minimum ten seats in the National Assembly at the 2009 election, making it the smallest of the six parties in the legislature. Later some of the deputies left the parliamentary group and it broke the minimum of ten, which inevitably made all parliamentary representatives of the party independent deputies.

It is led by Yane Yanev, who has frequently revealed classified documents backing up his claims of corruption. The party is close to the British Conservative Party.

The logo of Order, Law and Justice is a blue and orange checkerboard pattern.

== History ==
The party was founded by renaming and reforming the National Association - Bulgarian Agrarian People's Union (NS-BZNS), which had been part of the United Democratic Forces, decided on the fourth congress of the NS-BZNS in the end of 2005. Its main goal is fighting corruption. In the 2007 European election, RZS won only 0.5% of the vote. By the time of the 2009 election, this had increased to 4.7%, with RZS claiming that only electoral fraud had prevented it from receiving 10%, which would have given it two seats.

A month later, RZS took part in elections to the National Assembly. Its parliamentary ticket was headed by Atanas Semov, a law professor at the University of Sofia. Its platform called for the formation of a stable center-right coalition that would exclude the Bulgarian Socialist Party, a proactive campaign against political corruption, compulsory education until age 16, greater efforts to fight illiteracy, and the rejection of ethnic nationalism in politics.

The election saw RZS win 4.13% of the vote: just clearing the 4% threshold and entitling it to ten seats. The party supported the new centre-right government under Boyko Borisov, but refused to sign an official declaration of support, after pressure from the European Conservatives and Reformists over the involvement of Attack. One of RZS's MPs, Mario Tagarinski, left the party on 9 December 2009, pushing the party below the minimum of ten MPs required to form an official parliamentary group. Another MP, Dimitar Choukarski, left on 11 March 2010, reducing it further to eight MPs.

The party nominated Atanas Semov for president during the 2011 presidential election. He finished seventh with only 1.84% of the popular vote.

In the 2013 parliamentary election the party won only 1.67% of the popular vote and failed to win a seat.
