= BSP – United Left =

Left-wing Bulgarian political alliance

BSP – United Left БСП – обединена левица
- Abbreviation: BSP
- Leader: Krum Zarkov
- Parliamentary leader: Nataliya Kiselova
- Founded: 1991 (Pre-Electoral Union); 1994 (Democratic Left); 2001 (Coalition for Bulgaria); 2014 (BSP – Left Bulgaria); 2017 (BSP for Bulgaria); 2024 (BSP – United Left)
- Headquarters: 20 Positano Street, Sofia
- Ideology: Left-wing populism Social conservatism Factions: Pro-Europeanism; Russophilia; Nationalism
- Political position: Centre-left
- Member parties: see composition
- Colours: Red
- National Assembly: 0 / 240
- European Parliament: 2 / 17
- Sofia City Council: 8 / 61

Website
- bsp.bg

BSP – United Left (Bulgarian: БСП – обединена левица, romanized: BSP – obedinena levitsa), formerly BSP for Bulgaria (БСП за България, BSP za Balgariya) until 2024, is a centre-left electoral alliance in Bulgaria led by the Bulgarian Socialist Party. It is left-wing populist, socially conservative and pro-European. It includes pro-Russian and nationalist parties.

== Members of the coalition ==
2017 coalition logo

Year Name	Member parties
1991; Pre-Electoral Union	BLP; Bulgarian Socialist Party (Българска социалистическа партия); Christian Republican Party (Християнска републиканска партия); Era-3; FBSM; National Liberal Party–Stefan Stambolov (Националлиберална партия); Patriotic Party of Labour (Отечествена партия на труда); PKhZhD; SDPD; SMS
1994–1997; Democratic Left	Agrarian Union "Aleksandar Stamboliyski" (Zemedelski sayuz "Aleksandar Stamboliyski"); Bulgarian Socialist Party (Balgarska sotsialisticheska partiya); "Ecoglasnost" Political Club (Politicheski klub "Ekoglasnost")
2001–2005; Coalition for Bulgaria	Bulgarian Agrarian People's Union "Aleksandar Stamboliyski" (Balgarski Zemedelski Naroden Sayuz "Aleksandar Stamboliyski"); Bulgarian Socialist Party (Balgarska sotsialisticheska partiya).; Civil Union "Roma" (Grazhdansko obedinenie "Roma"); Communist Party of Bulgaria (Komunisticheska partiya na Bulgaria); Green Party of Bulgaria (Zelena partiya na Bulgaria); Movement for Social Humanism (Dvizhenie za sotsialen humanizam); Party of Bulgarian Social Democrats (Partiya Balgarski sotsialdemokrati); Political Movement "Social Democrats" (Politichesko dvizhenie "Sotsialdemokrati")
2007; European Socialists Platform	Bulgarian Socialist Party (Balgarska sotsialisticheska partiya).; Movement for Social Humanism (Dvizhenie za sotsialen humanizam)
2009; Coalition for Bulgaria	Bulgarian Socialist Party (Balgarska sotsialisticheska partiya).; Civil Union "Roma" (Grazhdansko obedinenie "Roma"); Communist Party of Bulgaria (Komunisticheska partiya na Bulgaria); Movement for Social Humanism (Dvizhenie za sotsialen humanizam); New Dawn (Nova zora); Party of Bulgarian Social Democrats (Partiya Balgarski sotsialdemokrati)
2013; Coalition for Bulgaria	Agrarian Union "Aleksandar Stamboliyski" (Zemedelski sayuz "Aleksandar Stamboliyski"); Bulgarian Socialist Party (Balgarska sotsialisticheska partiya).; Civil Union "Roma" (Grazhdansko obedinenie "Roma"); Communist Party of Bulgaria (Komunisticheska partiya na Bulgaria); European Security and Integration (Evropeyska sigurnost i integratsiya); Movement for Social Humanism (Dvizhenie za sotsialen humanizam); New Dawn (Nova zora); Party of Bulgarian Social Democrats (Partiya Balgarski sotsialdemokrati)
2014; BSP – Left Bulgaria	Agrarian Union "Aleksandar Stamboliyski" (Zemedelski sayuz "Aleksandar Stamboliyski"); Bulgarian Socialist Party (Balgarska sotsialisticheska partiya).; Civil Union "Roma" (Grazhdansko obedinenie "Roma"); Communist Party of Bulgaria (Komunisticheska partiya na Bulgaria); Ecoglasnost (Ekoglasnost); European Security and Integration (Evropeyska sigurnost i integratsiya); Movement for Social Humanism (Dvizhenie za sotsialen humanizam); New Dawn (Nova zora); Party of Bulgarian Social Democrats (Partiya Balgarski sotsialdemokrati); Party of the Bulgarian Communists (Partiya na balgarskite komunisti); Social Democrats (Sotsialdemokrati); Union of Communists in Bulgaria (Sayuz na komunistite v Balgariya); United Social Democracy (Obedinena sotsialdemokratsiya)
2017; BSP for Bulgaria	Agrarian Union "Aleksandar Stamboliyski" (Zemedelski sayuz "Aleksandar Stamboliyski"); Bulgarian Socialist Party (Balgarska sotsialisticheska partiya); Communist Party of Bulgaria (Komunisticheska partiya na Bulgaria); Ecoglasnost (Ekoglasnost); New Dawn (Nova zora); Party of Bulgarian Social Democrats (Partiya Balgarski sotsialdemokrati); Political Club "Trakiya" (Politicheski klub "Trakiya")
April 2021; BSP for Bulgaria	Agrarian Union "Aleksandar Stamboliyski" (Zemedelski sayuz "Aleksandar Stamboliyski"); Bulgarian Socialist Party (Balgarska sotsialisticheska partiya); Communist Party of Bulgaria (Komunisticheska partiya na Bulgaria); Ecoglasnost (Ekoglasnost); New Dawn (Nova zora); Political Club "Trakiya" (Politicheski klub "Trakiya")
July 2021; BSP for Bulgaria	Alternative for Bulgarian Revival (Alternativa za balgarsko vazrazhdane); Bulgarian Left (Bǎlgarskata levitsa); Bulgarian Socialist Party (Balgarska sotsialisticheska partiya); Communist Party of Bulgaria (Komunisticheska partiya na Bulgaria); Council of the European Scientific and Cultural Community (Sŭvet na evropeĭskata nauchna i kulturna obshtnost); Ecoglasnost (Ekoglasnost); Federation of Consumers in Bulgaria (Federatsiya na potrebitelite v Bŭlgariya); Movement for Social Humanism (Dvizhenie za sotsialen humanizam); Movement of Non-Party Candidates (Dvizhenie na nepartiĭnite kandidati); National Committee for the Protection of National Interests (Obshtonaroden komitet za zashtita na nats. interesi); New Dawn (Nova zora); Normal State (Normalna dŭrzhava); People's Power (Narodna sila); Political Club "Trakiya" (Politicheski klub "Trakiya"); Union for the Fatherland (Sŭyuz za Otechestvoto); United Bloc of Labour (Obedinen blok na truda)
November 2021; BSP for Bulgaria	Alternative for Bulgarian Revival (Alternativa za balgarsko vazrazhdane); Party of Bulgarian Social Democrats (партия Български социалдемократи); Bulgarian Left (Bǎlgarskata levitsa); Bulgarian Socialist Party (Balgarska sotsialisticheska partiya); Bulgarian Spring (Bŭlgarskata prolet); Communist Party of Bulgaria (Komunisticheska partiya na Bulgaria); Council of the European Scientific and Cultural Community (Sŭvet na evropeĭskata nauchna i kulturna obshtnost); Ecoglasnost (Ekoglasnost); Federation of Consumers in Bulgaria (Federatsiya na potrebitelite v Bŭlgariya); For Social and Civic Development (Za sotsialno i grazhdansko razvitie); Movement for Social Humanism (Dvizhenie za sotsialen humanizam); Movement of Non-Party Candidates (Dvizhenie na nepartiĭnite kandidati); National Committee for the Protection of National Interests (Obshtonaroden komitet za zashtita na nats. interesi); National Syndicate "Protection" (Natsionalen sindikat „Zashtita“); New Dawn (Nova zora); Normal State (Normalna dŭrzhava); People's Power (Narodna sila); Political Club "Trakiya" (Politicheski klub "Trakiya"); Union for the Fatherland (Sŭyuz za Otechestvoto); United Bloc of Labour (Obedinen blok na truda)
2022–2023; BSP for Bulgaria	Bulgarian Socialist Party (Balgarska sotsialisticheska partiya); Ecoglasnost (Ekoglasnost); Political Club "Trakiya" (Politicheski klub "Trakiya")
June 2024; BSP for Bulgaria	Bulgarian Socialist Party (Balgarska sotsialisticheska partiya); Ecoglasnost (Ekoglasnost); MIR (MIR); Political Club "Trakiya" (Politicheski klub "Trakiya")
October 2024; BSP – United Left	Alternative for Bulgarian Revival (Alternativa za balgarsko vazrazhdane); Bulgarian Socialist Party (Balgarska sotsialisticheska partiya); Bulgarian Social Democracy – EuroLeft (Bŭlgarska sotsialdemokratsiya – Evrolevitsa); Bulgarian Spring (Bŭlgarskata prolet); Communist Party of Bulgaria (Komunisticheska partiya na Bulgaria); Ecoglasnost (Ekoglasnost); European Security and Integration (Evropeyska sigurnost i integratsiya); Movement for Social Humanism (Dvizhenie za sotsialen humanizam); Movement 21 (Dvizhenie 21); Stand Up.BG (Izpravi se.BG); Political Club "Trakiya" (Politicheski klub "Trakiya"); Union for the Fatherland (Sŭyuz za Otechestvoto)
2026; BSP – United Left	Alternative for Bulgarian Revival (Alternativa za balgarsko vazrazhdane); Bulgarian Socialist Party (Balgarska sotsialisticheska partiya); Bulgarian Social Democracy – EuroLeft (Bŭlgarska sotsialdemokratsiya – Evrolevitsa); Communist Party of Bulgaria (Komunisticheska partiya na Bulgaria); Ecoglasnost (Ekoglasnost); European Security and Integration (Evropeyska sigurnost i integratsiya); Movement for Social Humanism (Dvizhenie za sotsialen humanizam); Political Club "Trakiya" (Politicheski klub "Trakiya"); Rise (Podem); Union for the Fatherland (Sŭyuz za Otechestvoto)

== Election results ==
=== National Assembly ===
Election	Votes	%	Seats	+/–	Government
1991	1,836,050	33.14 (2nd)	106 / 240		Opposition
1994	2,262,943	43.50 (1st)	125 / 240	▲19	Majority
1997	939,308	22.44 (2nd)	58 / 240	▼73	Opposition
2001	783,372	17.15 (3rd)	48 / 240	▼10	Opposition
2005	1,129,196	30.95 (1st)	82 / 240	▲34	Coalition
2009	748,114	17.70 (2nd)	40 / 240	▼42	Opposition
2013	942,541	26.61 (1st)	84 / 240	▲44	Coalition
2014	505,527	15.40 (2nd)	39 / 240	▼45	Opposition
2017	955,490	27.19 (2nd)	80 / 240	▲41	Opposition
Apr 2021	480,146	15.01 (3rd)	43 / 240	▼37	Snap election
Jul 2021	365,695	13.39 (3rd)	36 / 240	▼7	Snap election
Nov 2021	266,667	10.12 (4th)	26 / 240	▼9	Coalition
2022	232,958	8.98 (5th)	25 / 240	▼1	Snap election
2023	225,914	8.94 (5th)	23 / 240	▼2	Opposition
Jun 2024	151,557	6.85 (5th)	19 / 240	▼4	Snap election
Oct 2024	184,403	7.32 (5th)	19 / 240	Steady	Coalition
2026	97,753	2.97 (8th)	0 / 240	▼19	Extra-parliamentary

== See also ==
- Fatherland Front (Bulgaria)
- The Left (Bulgaria)
- Left Union for a Clean and Holy Republic
- Solidary Bulgaria
