= June 2024 Bulgarian parliamentary election =

- 9 June 2024
- All 240 seats in the 50th National Assembly; 121 seats needed for a majority
- Turnout: 34.43% (▼6.08pp)
Party	Leader	Vote %	Seats	+/–
GERB–SDS	Boyko Borisov	23.99	68	−1
DPS	Delyan Peevski	16.56	47	+11
PP–DB	Kiril Petkov	13.92	39	−25
Revival	Kostadin Kostadinov	13.38	38	+1
BSPzB	Korneliya Ninova	6.85	19	−4
ITN	Slavi Trifonov	5.79	16	+5
Velichie	Nikolay Markov	4.52	13	New
This lists parties that won seats. See the complete results below.
Results by constituency
Prime Minister before	Prime Minister after
Dimitar Glavchev (caretaker); Independent (First Glavchev Government)	Dimitar Glavchev (caretaker); Independent (Second Glavchev Government)

Early parliamentary elections were held in Bulgaria on 9 June 2024, to elect members of the National Assembly. The election coincided with the European Parliament election on the same day. This parliamentary election was initially scheduled to be held before 12 June 2027; however, the planned rotation agreed to by GERB and PP–DB failed to materialise in March 2024, and no other government could be formed. GERB–SDS had the best results, winning nearly 24% of the vote and 68 seats, but it did not obtain a majority in the National Assembly. Voter turnout was 34%, which was the lowest turnout since the end of Communist rule in 1989.

The new elected 50th Parliament replaced the 49th Parliament, when all elected members were sworn in on 19 June 2024. The final of three government formation attempts failed on 5 August 2024. On 9 August, the Bulgarian President as a consequence instead appointed Goritsa Grancharova-Kozhareva (Vice President of the Bulgarian National Audit Office) as the next caretaker prime minister. Grancharova-Kozhareva was granted ten days to form a proposal for the next caretaker government to be appointed on 20 August 2024, with the upcoming next parliamentary elections expected to be held on 20 October 2024.

On 19 August, the proposed Grancharova-Kozhareva caretaker government however was rejected by the Bulgarian President, as he opposed the proposal to allow the controversial figure Kalin Stoyanov to continue as interior minister. On 27 August, the President instead issued a decree to appoint the Second Glavchev Government as the next caretaker government to replace the First Glavchev Government (with 17 out of 20 ministers being reappointed), and scheduled a new round of early parliamentary elections to be held on 27 October 2024.

== Background ==
Following several snap elections, the Bulgarian National Assembly had failed to put together a long-lasting government since 'anti-corruption' parties made a breakthrough in the April 2021 election. The 2023 election saw little change from 2022, with Boyko Borisov's centre-right GERB–SDS narrowly coming in first place, above the centrist PP–DB alliance. The far right Revival (VAZ) and the populist There is Such a People (ITN) made gains, with the latter re-entering the Assembly after it failed to reach the electoral threshold in 2022.

On 22 May 2023, the PP- and GERB-led alliances agreed to form a government with a rotational premiership. Nikolai Denkov, PP's candidate, would be the Prime Minister for the first nine months of the government and Mariya Gabriel, the GERB candidate, would serve as deputy prime minister and foreign affairs minister. After nine months, the two would switch positions.

Denkov resigned in accordance with the rotation agreement on 5 March, to allow Gabriel to become the new Prime Minister. On 20 March 2024, the planned government rotation and signing of a renewed government failed due to disagreements between the two alliances on the cabinet and breaking down of relations. Negotiations ensued across to form a new government, but failed to produce any governments that could reach a majority support. GERB rejected the chance to form a government. PP–DB made a limited attempt to respect the original rotation agreement. The final chance to form a government, chosen by president Rumen Radev, went to ITN, which was immediately rejected.

On 29 March, as per Article 98 of the constitution, the President appointed the Chairman of the National Audit Office, Dimitar Glavchev, as the candidate for caretaker prime minister. He was granted a one-week deadline of until 6 April to propose the composition of the caretaker government.

Glavchev presented his proposal for the caretaker government on 5 April, accepted by the President following negotiations and scheduling the election for 9 June. Glavchev and his cabinet were inaugurated on 9 April by the National Assembly.

=== Election schedule ===
The Central Election Commission announced the campaign would begin at midday on 10 May and end at midnight on 7 June.

The current 49th Parliament was to stay in session at least until the election campaign begins, where a decision of election recess is expected to be adopted by Parliament. The 49th Parliament suspended its normal working process by an adopted election recess on 27 April. While on election recess the 49th Parliament could reconvene for an extraordinary sitting in exceptional circumstances. The 50th Parliament will replace the 49th Parliament as soon as the newly elected members are sworn in after the election.

On election day, polling opened at 07:00 and closed at 20:00.

== Parties ==
=== Parliamentary parties ===
The table below lists the political party groups represented in the 49th National Assembly.

Name		Ideology	Position	Leader(s)	2023 result	
Name		Ideology	Position	Leader(s)	Votes (%)	Seats
GERB–SDS	GERB–SDS	Conservatism	Centre-right	Boyko Borisov	25.39%	69 / 240 (Note: GERB 66, SDS 2, DG 1)
PP–DB	We Continue the Change – Democratic Bulgaria	Liberalism	Centre to centre-right	Kiril Petkov; Assen Vassilev; Hristo Ivanov; Atanas Atanasov	23.54%	64 / 240 (Note: PP 36, DaB! 13, DSB 10, ZD 3, Volt 1, SEK 1)
Revival	Revival	Ultranationalism	Far-right	Kostadin Kostadinov	13.58%	37 / 240
DPS	Movement for Rights and Freedoms	Turkish minority interests	Centre	Delyan Peevski; Dzhevdet Chakarov	13.18%	36 / 240
BSPzB	BSP for Bulgaria	Social democracy	Centre-left	Korneliya Ninova	8.56%	23 / 240
ITN	There is Such a People	Populism	Right-wing	Slavi Trifonov	3.94%	

=== Contesting parties and coalitions ===
Below is the official list of parties and coalitions that registered lists for the Bulgarian Parliamentary elections.

#	Party or coalition			Ideology	Leader	2023 result	
#	Party or coalition			Ideology	Leader	Votes (%)	Seats
1	ITN		There is Such a People	Right-wing populism	Slavi Trifonov	3.94%	11 / 240
2	GN		Peoples Voice	Right-wing populism	Svetoslav Vitkov	0.21%	0 / 240
3	Blue Bulgaria	KOD	Conservative Union of the Right	National conservatism Anti-communism	Petar Moskov	0.29%	0 / 240
3	Blue Bulgaria	NDSV	National Movement for Stability and Progress	Liberalism	Stanimir Ilchev	0.25%	0 / 240
3	Blue Bulgaria	BDF	Bulgarian Democratic Forum	National conservatism Anti-communism	Zhaklin Toleva	DNP	
3	Blue Bulgaria	DZ	Movement for Democratic Action-DZ	Liberal conservatism	Stefan Ivanov	DNP	
3	Blue Bulgaria	DBG	Bulgaria for Citizens Movement	Liberalism	Jordan Jordanov	DNP	
3	Blue Bulgaria	KB	Conservative Bulgaria	National conservatism	Boris Yachev	DNP	
3	Blue Bulgaria	RDP	Radical-Democratic Party	Social conservatism Anti-communism	Zahari Petrov	DNP	
3	Blue Bulgaria	BND	Bulgarian New Democracy	Liberal conservatism	Valeri Georgiev	DNP	
3	Blue Bulgaria	ZNS	Agrarian People's Union	Agrarianism; Conservatism	Rumen Yonchev	DNP	
4	We Citizens	BP	Bulgarian Spring	Left-wing nationalism	Svetoslav Mandikov	DNP	
4	We Citizens	BRSP	Bulgarian Workers-Peasant Party	Marxism-Leninism	Georgi Ivanov; Yordan Maldzhanski	DNP	
4	We Citizens	KOY	Competence, Responsibility and Truth	Populism	Svetozar Saev	Out of EU and NATO	
4	We Citizens	Natsiya	Nation	Ultranationalism; Hard Euroscepticism	Kiril Gumnerov	Out of EU and NATO	
5	IND	Independent candidate		National conservatism Economic liberalism	Kuzman Iliev	DNP (Note: Only participated in and appeared on the ballot for the European parliamentary elections.)	
6	Bulgarian Voice	BG	Bulgarian Voice	Bulgarian nationalism	Georgi Popov	DNP	
6	Bulgarian Voice	AzB	Alternative for Bulgaria	National conservatism	Nikolay Drenchev	New	
7	Rose Coalition	BSDE	Bulgarian Social Democracy-EuroLeft	Social Democracy	Aleksandr Tomov	0.10%	0 / 240
7	Rose Coalition	OBT	United Block of Labour	Social democracy Labourism	Yekaterina Atanasova	DNP	
7	Rose Coalition	P2000	Patriotism 2000		Julian Ivanov	DNP	
8	Center	Svoboda	Svovoda	Bulgarian nationalism	Vladimir Simeonov	DNP	
8	Center	BZP	Bulgarian Agrarian Party	Agrarianism	Peycho Kasarov	DNP	
8	Center	C	National Movement "Center"	Anti-corruption; Populism	Darin Drosev	New	
9	Solidary Bulgaria	BL	Bulgarian Left	Democratic socialism	Boyan Kirov	DNP	
9	Solidary Bulgaria	OSD	United Social-Democracy	Social democracy	Yordan Gergov	DNP	
9	Solidary Bulgaria	IS.BG	Stand Up.BG	Social democracy Left-wing populism	Maya Manolova	Left!	
9	Solidary Bulgaria	ND	Normal State	Social democracy	Georgi Kadiev	Left!	
9	Solidary Bulgaria	SB	Solidary Bulgaria	Social democracy	Vanya Grigorova	New	
10	E		Unification	Centrism; Liberalism	Ivan Hristanov	New	
11	BNO		Bulgarian National Unification	Bulgarian nationalism National conservatism	Georgi Georgiev-Goti	0.09%	0 / 240
12	Revival		Revival	Ultranationalism; Right-wing populism	Kostadin Kostadinov	13.58%	37 / 240
13	MECh		Morality, Unity, Honour	Anti-corruption; Social conservatism	Radostin Vasilev	New	
14	PP–DB	PP	We Continue the Change	Liberalism; Anti-corruption	Kiril Petkov; Assen Vassilev	23.53%	64 / 240
14	PP–DB	Volt	Volt Bulgaria	European federalism Pro-Europeanism	Nastimir Ananiev	23.53%	64 / 240
14	PP–DB	DSB	Democrats for a Strong Bulgaria	Conservatism; Anti-communism	Atanas Atanasov	23.53%	64 / 240
14	PP–DB	DB	Yes, Bulgaria!	Liberalism; Anti-corruption	Hristo Ivanov	23.53%	64 / 240
15	ISI		People's Party "Truth and Only the Truth"	Anti-vaccination; Ultranationalism	Ventsislav Angelov	0.29%	0 / 240
16	BV		Bulgarian Rise	National conservatism	Stefan Yanev	2.93%	0 / 240
17	Citizens Block	BDS-R	Bulgarian Democratic Union-Radicals	Bulgarian nationalism	Tsvetan Manchev	DNP	
17	Citizens Block	PBZ	Party of Bulgarian Women	Women's issues	Vesela Draganova	DNP	
17	Citizens Block	GB	Citizens Block	Anti-corruption; Social conservatism	Ivan Geshev	New	
18	ONB		Society for a New Bulgaria	Social conservatism	Margarit Mitsev	DNP	
19	The Left!	ABV	Alternative for Bulgarian Revival	Social democracy Moderate social conservatism	Rumen Petkov	2.14%	0 / 240
19	The Left!	ex-BSP faction		Social democracy	Valeri Zhablyanov	2.14%	0 / 240
19	The Left!	D21	Movement 21	Social democracy	Tatyana Doncheva	2.14%	0 / 240
19	The Left!	ZS-AS	Agrarian Union "Aleksandar Stamboliyski"	Agrarianism	Spas Panchev	2.14%	0 / 240
19	The Left!	ZP	Green Party of Bulgaria	Green politics	Marina Dragomiretskaya	DNP	
19	The Left!	PDS	Political Movement "Social Democrats"	Social democracy	Yelena Noneva	DNP	
19	The Left!	NDSO	National Movement for the Salvation of the Fatherland	Left-wing nationalism	Todor Rashev	DNP	
20	PnZ		Party of the Greens	Green politics Left-wing nationalism	Vladimir Nikolov	Together Bulgaria	
21	NI		We Are Coming	Liberalism	Mariya Kapon	DNP	
22	GERB–SDS	GERB	GERB	Social conservatism Pro-Europeanism	Boyko Borisov	25.39%	69 / 240
22	GERB–SDS	SDS	SDS	Christian democracy Anti-communism	Rumen Hristov	25.39%	69 / 240
22	GERB–SDS	DG	George's Day Movement	National conservatism Bulgarian nationalism	Lyuben Dilov Jr.	25.39%	69 / 240
23	BNU-ND		Bulgarian National Union	Ultranationalism	Boyan Rasate	0.07%	0 / 240
24	BSP for Bulgaria	BSP	Bulgarian Socialist Party	Social conservatism Social democracy	Korneliya Ninova	8.56%	23 / 240
24	BSP for Bulgaria	–	Ecoglasnost	Green politics Environmentalism	Emil Georgiev	8.56%	23 / 240
24	BSP for Bulgaria	Trakiya	Political Club "Trakiya"	Left wing nationalism	Stefan Nachev	8.56%	23 / 240
24	BSP for Bulgaria	MIR	MIR	Left-wing nationalism	Simeon Slavchev	0.15%	0 / 240
25	Velichie		Majesty	Bulgarian nationalism Anti-corruption	Nikolay Markov	New	
26	VMRO		VMRO	National conservatism Bulgarian nationalism	Krasimir Karakachanov	DNP	
27	PD		Direct Democracy	Bulgarian nationalism Direct democracy	Petar Klisarov	DNP	
28	DPS		Movement for Rights and Freedoms	Turkish minority interests Liberalism	Delyan Peevski; Dzhevdet Chakarov	13.18%	36 / 240
29	ZD		Green Movement	Green liberalism Green politics	Toma Belev; Daniela Bozhinova	PP–DB	
30	ZVB		For a Great Bulgaria	Bulgarian nationalism	Kamen Popov	New	
31	BSDD		Bulgarian Union for Direct Democracy	Direct democracy	Georgi Nedelchev	0.23%	0 / 240
32	Neutral Bulgaria	RVO	Russophiles for the Revival of the Fatherland	Russophilia; National conservatism	Nikolay Malinov	0.4%	0 / 240
32	Neutral Bulgaria	BKP	Bulgarian Communist Party	Communism	Zonka Spasova	0.4%	0 / 240
32	Neutral Bulgaria	PBK	Party of the Bulgarian Communists	Communism; Marxism–Leninism	Collective leadership	0.4%	0 / 240
32	Neutral Bulgaria	KPB	Communist Party of Bulgaria	Marxism–Leninism	Alexander Paunov	DNP	

== Campaign ==
=== Campaign slogans and websites ===
The following list present the official campaign slogans and websites of parties that contested the 2024 Bulgarian parliamentary election:

Party or coalition	Slogan	Site
There is Such a People	Let's bring back sanity!	https://pp-itn.bg/
Peoples Voice	The only ones left suitable	https://glasnaroden.com/
Blue Bulgaria	Because there is a sense	https://sinyabulgaria.bg/
We Citizens	Let's get our country back	https://www.facebook.com/profile.php?id=61559626163761
Kuzman Iliev Iliev – independent	Bulgaria can!	https://bmsbg.org/
Bulgarian Voice	There is an alternative!	https://ppbulgarskiglas.bg/
Coalition of the Rose	Together we can!	https://www.facebook.com/zaednoreferendum
Center	It's time... FOR YOU	https://center-bg.com/
Solidary Bulgaria	It's time for the people!	https://solidbul.eu/
Unification	Concrete solutions	https://edinenie.bg/
Bulgarian National Unification	United with you	https://bno-bg.com/
Revival	We are reviving Bulgaria/Europe	https://vazrazhdane.bg/
Morality, Unity, Honour	Bulgaria First!	https://www.ppmech.bg/
PP–DB	Majority for a normal European Bulgaria	https://ppdb.bg/
People's Party "Truth and Only the Truth"	Divine support	https://www.facebook.com/groups/207009572756325/
Bulgarian Rise	Together for the rise of Bulgaria!	https://bgvazhod.com/
Citizens Block	Bulgarians, you are the fist	https://grajdanskiblok.bg/
Society for a New Bulgaria	Justice for all, security for all	https://onbbg.org/
The Left!	Not to war! Peace to Bulgaria!	https://www.levicata.com/
Party of the Greens	Bulgaria has everything it needs to cope with the crisis and develop itself!	https://partianazelenite.bg/
We Are Coming	Not to fear!	https://nieidvame.org/
GERB–SDS	A stable Bulgaria in a secure Europe	https://gerb.bg/
Bulgarian National Union	Save Bulgaria, save yourself!	https://bgns.net/
BSP for Bulgaria	For a dignified Bulgaria in a peaceful Europe	https://bsp.bg/
Majesty/Greatness	Majesty/Greatness for Bulgaria!	https://velichie.bg/
VMRO	Time for unity and strength!	https://www.facebook.com/www.vmro.bg/
Direct Democracy	A new political model	https://www.directdemocracy.bg/
Movement for Rights and Freedoms	Together with the people	https://www.dps.bg/
Green Movement	The power of being honest	https://zelenodvizhenie.bg/
For a Great Bulgaria	Bulgaria a zone of peace	https://zavelikabulgaria.bg/
Bulgarian Union for Direct Democracy	New, time-proven!	https://www.budd.bg/
Neutral Bulgaria	Let's talk about the important stuff!	https://www.facebook.com/profile.php?id=61552028243492

=== Allegations of corruption and improper political behaviour ===
==== Customs Agency scandal ====
On 3 April, the head of the Customs Agency, Petya Bankova, along with her deputy, and two others were arrested in relation to their alleged participation in an organised criminal group dealing blackmarket tobacco products. Following the arrests, Secretary of the Ministry of Interior Zhivko Kotsev announced his resignation, with PP–DB leaders suggesting this had been coerced. A day later, Kotsev withdrew his resignation in a joint-briefing with acting Prime Minister Nikolai Denkov where they repeated the claim.

Photos including the suspects and PP–DB-affiliated politicians were leaked, and Parliament formed a commission to investigate the scandal. Controversially, one of its aims was to investigate the role of PP co-leader Assen Vassilev in the affair. The commission heard claims that the PP–DB politicians were involved. These claims were disputed, and former PP interior minister Boyko Rashkov claimed those alleging the link were themselves involved in the scandal. Vassilev also appeared before the committee, denying any wrongdoing or connections with the named suspects.

On 25 April, the committee published its report, which claimed to prove Assen Vassilev's role within the scheme.

The events of the scandal, despite occurring outside the election campaign period, were identified by some analysts as signalling the "beginning" of the pre-election campaign. Additionally, the scandal was used in the campaign, notably by ITN, in order to attack PP–DB.

==== "Turkish Stream" gas pipeline scandal ====
In early March, an alleged copy of the roadmap for the construction of the TurkStream (also known as the "Balkan Stream") gas pipeline through Bulgaria was released by the investigative newspaper, BG Elves. It suggested that the main role in the construction of the pipeline was undertaken by Russian firms, additionally it demonstrated that the pipeline's construction directly served Russian interests. The pipeline was given approval by the Third Borisov government.

PP–DB accused GERB of helping Russia build a new pathway for natural gas circumventing Ukraine, thus enabling the Russian invasion of Ukraine. A parliamentary committee was formed to investigate the leak, however, its work ended up being hindered due to partisan gridlock.

==== Audio-tape leaks ====
As had occurred previously during the government formation of the Denkov Government, audio recordings by senior PP–DB figures were allegedly leaked. One, published on the online newspaper Afera, was from a PP leadership meeting where they discussed illegal party finance methods. PP–DB representatives claimed this recording was taken out of context.

==== Borisov–Peevski billboard ====
As part of their campaign, PP–DB released a billboard containing the image of former Prime Minister Denkov, on one side, and the leaders of GERB and DPS, Borisov and Peevski, on the other, with a sign asking "who do you want to be prime minister?". The sign was promptly removed after a legal complaint by GERB, who claimed the billboard denigrated the person of Boyko Borisov. In a campaign meeting, Borisov called Denkov's behaviour as offensive, and claimed that this demonstrated that Denkov was unfit to be prime minister.

=== Public finances ===
During the election campaign, GERB, specifically Delyan Dobrev consistently criticised the policies of Assen Vassilev, accusing him of increasing the public debt and increasing inflation, while not doing enough to attract investment. Borisov declared that if GERB were to come to power they would implement a more "strict" fiscal policy.

PP–DB, on the other hand, defended the track record of Assen Vassilev, pointing to an increase in incomes. They further accused GERB of trying to add spending outside of that set aside by the budget in order to sabotage Bulgaria's entrance into the Eurozone.

Parties on the left, such as BSP, Levitsata and Solidary Bulgaria, generally supported the implementation of a progressive tax system, with BSP, for example, advocating for a tax break for all those under 26.

The right-wing coalition, Blue Bulgaria, called for less state involvement in the economy, with government finance instead being focused on healthcare, education and security.

=== Foreign policy ===
One of the key policy issues which dominated the elections was Bulgaria's position on the Russian invasion of Ukraine. A number of parties (specifically, Revival, BSP, Levitsata!, Solidary Bulgaria and Velichie) advocated for Bulgaria to not send lethal aid to Ukraine and supported paying Russia for gas.

=== Post-election government formation ===
Due to the continuous political instability in Bulgaria, ever since the April 2021 Bulgarian parliamentary election, post-election government formations has been one of the key topics of the election campaign.

GERB, shortly after the collapse of government negotiations following the Denkov government's resignation, had indicated that they would re-initiate negotiations with PP–DB, albeit conditional on a "new approach" from the PP–DB leadership. However, they became more hostile to PP–DB, especially after they supported a motion to oust the GERB speaker of the National Assembly. Boyko Borisov, GERB's leader, made clear that they would not govern solely with DPS. On 24 May, Borisov announced that GERB should take a "leading role" in any future government.

PP–DB expressed a willingness to negotiate a coalition government with GERB, however it excluded the possibility of any involvement from Delyan Peevski in a future government, thus excluding DPS. During an interview with bTV, former Prime Minister Nikolay Denkov stated that PP–DB would not form a government which involved either Boyko Borisov or Delyan Peevski.

Delyan Peevski, on his part, did not exclude his party's participation in either a GERB-led or PP–DB-led government, claiming he had a stable working relationship with both PP leader Kiril Petkov and Boyko Borisov.

A number of parties promised during the campaign period promised they would not enter any informal governing arrangements with GERB, DPS or PP–DB. Specifically, BSP leader, Korneliya Ninova, highlighted her party as the "only one" which had not engaged in any such deals with GERB. Solidary Bulgaria candidate, and Stand Up.BG leader, Maya Manolova promised that Solidary, if they entered parliament, would not govern with GERB, DPS or PP–DB.

== Opinion polls ==
Local regression of polls conducted, excluding "none of the above"

The opinion poll results below were recalculated from the original data and exclude polls that chose "I will not vote" or "I am uncertain" options.

121 seats are needed for a parliamentary majority.

Polling firm	Fieldwork date	Sample	GERB–SDS	PP–DB	Revival	DPS	BSPzB	ITN	BV	Left	SBG	SB	VMRO	Velich	Center	Others	NOTA	Lead	Govt.	Opp.
2024 election	9 June 2024	—N/a	24.0; 68	13.9; 39	13.4; 38	16.6; 47	6.9; 19	5.8; 11	0.6; 0	0.7; 0	1.4; 0	1.5; 0	1.0 0	4.5 13	1.1 0	12.3	2.9	7.4	—	—
Alpha Research	1–4 June 2024	1000	25.1; 71	15.4; 44	15.2; 43	14.8; 42	8.1; 23	6.2; 17	—	—	2.4; 0	3.3; 0				9.5	—	9.7	—	—
CAM	31 May – 4 June 2024	821	26.4; 73	16.6; 46	14.5; 40	15; 42	8.4; 24	5.3; 14	1.8; 0	1.4; 0	3.2; 0	2.4; 0	1			5 (Note: Includes VMRO at 1%)	4.2	9.7	—	—
Exacta	30 May – 4 June 2024	1050	26.4; 74	15.5; 43	14.8; 41	14.6; 40	9; 25	6.2; 17	—	—	2.1; 0	3.2; 0				8.2	—	9.7	—	—
Gallup	29 May – 4 June 2024	1003	25.9; 72	15.7; 44	15.5; 43	15.3; 42	8; 22	6.1; 17	1; 0	1.1; 0	3.1; 0	2.8; 0	1,5	1.7		5.5 (Note: Includes Majesty at 1.7% and VMRO at 1.5%)	—	10.2	—	—
Trend	29 May – 4 June 2024	1007	26.5; 74	15.3; 43	15.1; 42	14.9; 42	8.5; 23	5.9; 16	1.1; 0	1.3; 0	3.4; 0	2.1; 0	1.5			5.9 (Note: Includes VMRO at 1.5%)	4.4	11.2	—	—
Sova Harris	29 May – 3 June 2024	1000	25.5; 74	15.1; 43	15.3; 44	14.2; 41	8.4; 24	5.1; 14	1.2; 0	2.5; 0	3.4; 0	3.2; 0	1.7		1.1	6.1 (Note: Includes VMRO at 1.7% and CENTER at 1.1%)	—	10.2	—	—
Mediana	25 May – 1 June 2024	990	28.6; 81	12.9; 37	14.9; 42	13.5; 38	8.6; 25	6.3; 17	1.6; 0	3.2; 0	3.0; 0	3.4; 0				4.0	—	13.7	—	—
Market Links	23 May – 2 June 2024	1004	27.5; 79	17.1; 49	12.4; 36	13.7; 39	8.4; 24	4.5; 13	—	—	2; 0	3; 0			2.3	7.7 (Note: Includes CENTER at 2.3%)	3.5	10.5	—	—
Mediana	12–18 May 2024	978	27.5; 77	13.7; 38	15.7; 44	14.2; 39	9; 25	6.2; 17	1.2; 0	2.9; 0	2.7; 0	3.1; 0	1.3			3.8 (Note: Includes VMRO at 1.3%)	—	11.8	—	—
Trend	11–18 May 2024	1003	26.1; 74	15.4; 43	14.8; 42	14.9; 42	8.5; 24	5.5; 15	1.2; 0	1.4; 0	2.4; 0	1.8; 0	1.1			8 (Note: Includes VMRO at 1.1%)	5.1	10.7	—	—
Sova Harris	8–13 May 2024	1000	26.6; 73	16.1; 45	15.3; 42	15; 41	9.1; 24	5.4; 15	—	1.4; 0	3.8; 0	2.1; 0	1.5		1.4	4.3 (Note: Includes VMRO at 1.5%, CENTER at 1.4% and Citizens Block at 0.7%)	—	10.5	—	—
Market Links	27 Apr – 9 May 2024	—	28.4; 80	19.3; 55	14; 39	14.4; 41	9.2; 25	3.6; 0	—	—	2; 0	1.5; 0				4.1	3.6	9.1	—	—
Alpha Research	24 Apr – 2 May 2024	1000	25.4; 71	17.5; 49	14.6; 41	14.9; 41	8.5; 24	5.2; 14	1.3; 0	1.9; 0	2.6; 0	2.5; 0				5.6	—	7.9	—	—
Gallup	22 Apr – 2 May 2024	808	26.5; 74	16.4; 45	15.1; 42	15.4; 43	8.4; 23	4.7; 13	—	—	2.5; 0	1.5; 0	1.1			9.5 (Note: Includes VMRO at 1.1%)	—	10.1	—	—
Trend	12 Apr–19 Apr 2024	1002	24.9; 73	15.5; 45	14.2; 41	14.4; 42	9.1; 26	4.8; 13	1.7; 0	1.8; 0	—	—				6.6	6.9	9.4	—	—
Exacta	11 Apr–18 Apr 2024	1020	25.9; 73	16.4; 46	13.8; 39	14.0; 40	9.6; 27	5.2; 15	—	—	—	—				7.7	7.4	9.5	—	—
Market Links	30 Mar–7 Apr 2024	1046	25.5	17.1	10.3	11.8	8.7	3.9	—	—	—	—				22.7 (Note: As the full data for this poll was not released, it is possible that it includes undecided and uncertain voters. Recalculating the data to only include the numbers for the listed parties may be advised. Market Links often include undecided voters in their final results)		8.4	—	—
Gallup International	28 Mar–5 Apr 2024	805	27.4; 73	17.9; 47	14.9; 39	15.2; 40	10.5; 28	5.2; 13	—	—	—	—				8.9	—	9.5	—	—
Mar 2024			The Denkov Government resigns. A snap election is scheduled for 9 June																	
Gallup International	29 Feb–8 Mar 2024	810	26.4; 69	19.6; 52	14.8; 39	14.7; 39	10.6; 28	5.1; 13	—	—	—	—				8.8	—	6.8	46.0	54.0
Alpha Research	27 Feb–3 Mar 2024	1000	27.0; 71	21.9; 58	14.6; 38	11.0; 29	10.9; 29	5.8; 15	—	—	—	—				8.8	—	5.1	48.9	51.1
Market Links	24 Feb–3 Mar 2024	1058	27.9; 77	21.2; 58	10.8; 29	15.0; 41	8.8; 24	3.9; 11 (Note: ITN are given seats in the Assembly despite being seemingly below the threshold as None of the above votes do not count towards the threshold.)	—	—	—	—				8.2	3.7	6.7	49.1	46.6
24 February 2024			Delyan Peevski and Dzhevdet Chakarov are elected as co-chairmen of DPS																	
Market Links	26 Jan–4 Feb 2024	1016	27.7; 76	20.0; 55	11.5; 31	14.1; 39	9.9; 27	4.4; 12	—	—	—	—				7.7	4.7	7.7	47.7	47.6
Trend	17–24 Jan 2024	1016	24.8; 70	17.8; 50	14.6; 41	13.8; 39	9.6; 27	4.8; 13	1.8; 0	1.9; 0	—	—				3.9	7.0	7.0	42.6	50.4
Mediana	7–13 Dec 2023	978	22.9; 68	15.6; 46	13.5; 40	12.2; 36	11.3; 33	5.9; 17	1.5; 0	3.5; 0	—	—				3.6	10.0	7.3	38.5	51.5
Alpha Research	22–30 Nov 2023	1000	25.9; 68	21.1; 55	14.4; 38	12.8; 34	11.4; 30	5.8; 15	—	—	—	—				8.6	—	4.8	47.0	53.0
Market Links	10–19 Nov 2023	1014	26.3; 71	20.1; 54	12.8; 35	14.4; 39	10.5; 29	4.5; 12	—	—	—	—				7.0	4.2	6.2	46.4	49.4
Trend	11–18 Nov 2023	1006	24.7; 70	17.9; 50	15.4; 43	13.3; 38	9.4; 27	4.4; 12	2.0; 0	1.9; 0	—	—				3.6	7.4	6.8	42.6	50.0
Market Links	26 Sept–8 Oct 2023	1032	27.1; 78	20.1; 58	12.7; 37	14.2; 41	9.1; 26	3.2; 0	—	—	—	—				7.0	6.8	7.0	47.2	46.0
Trend	2–8 Sep 2023	1002	24.9; 70	18.3; 51	16.1; 45	13.4; 38	8.7; 24	4.2; 12	2.1; 0	1.9; 0	—	—				3.9	6.5	6.6	43.2	50.3
Market Links	11–18 Aug 2023	1012	26.2; 70	21.7; 58	12.8; 34	15.1; 41	8.3; 22	5.4; 15	—	—	—	—				7.2	3.0	4.5	47.9	48.8
Mediana	18–24 Jul 2023	976	23.3; 67	18.0; 51	15.4; 44	12.9; 37	9.0; 26	5.4; 15	2.5; 0	2.1; 0	—	—				2.0 (Note: Justice for Bulgaria with 1.0%, "Other" with 1.0%)	9.3	5.3	41.3	49.3
Trend	4–11 Jul 2023	1001	24.8; 70	19.1; 54	15.5; 43	13.7; 38	8.6; 24	4.0; 11	1.8; 0	1.9; 0	—	—				4.3	6.3	5.7	43.9	49.8
Gallup International	29 Jun–9 Jul 2023	809	26.4; 69	21.8; 57	14.9; 39	14.5; 38	9.7; 26	4.3; 11	2.0; 0	—	—	—				6.4	—	4.6	48.2	51.8
CAM	3–7 Jul 2023	1021	26.2; 74	21.4; 61	14.5; 41	13.4; 38	9.0; 26	3.7; 0	1.8; 0	1.8; 0	—	—				3.7	4.5	4.8	47.6	47.9
Market Links	22 Jun–2 Jul 2023	1011	27.5; 75	20.9; 57	13.8; 38	17.0; 46	8.9; 24	3.8; 0	—	—	—	—				3.6	4.6	6.6	48.4	47.0
Alpha Research	20–26 Jun 2023	1000	25.1; 70	20.2; 56	15.4; 43	12.6; 35	8.8; 25	4.1; 11	—	2.7; 0	—	—				7.5	3.6	4.9	45.3	51.1
Exacta	12–20 Jun 2023	1040	24.4; 67	20.1; 56	14.8; 41	13.2; 37	9.5; 26	4.8; 13	1.9; 0	1.8; 0	—	—				3.6	5.9	4.3	44.5	49.6
Trend	10–16 Jun 2023	1008	24.9; 69	19.4; 54	15.3; 43	13.5; 37	8.9; 25	4.3; 12	2.2; 0	1.9; 0	—	—				3.8	5.8	5.5	44.3	49.9
6 June 2023			The Denkov Government is sworn in																	
Gallup International	27 Apr–5 May 2023	803	26.8; 69	24.1; 62	14.7; 38	13.9; 36	9.1; 24	4.1; 11	3.2; 0	1.5; 0	—	—				2.6	4.3 (Note: This poll reported the percentage respondents do not support any party, however the rest of the data was recalculated to exclude these percentages)	2.7	50.9	49.1
2023 election	2 April 2023	—N/a	26.5; 69	24.6; 64	14.2; 37	13.8; 36	8.9; 23	4.1; 11	3.1; 0	2.2 (Note: ISBG, contested the 2023 parliamentary elections with the Left! and went on to run with Solidary Bulgaria); 0		0.55 (Note: Result of NDSV and KOD, two members of the Blue Bulgaria coalition); 0				2.6	4.1	1.9	51.1	48.9%

== Results ==
The results showed that no party attained a majority in the National Assembly, with GERB attaining a plurality of seats. Turnout was 34.4 percent, the lowest since the end of communist rule in 1989.

Party	Votes	%	Seats	+/–
GERB–SDS	530,658	23.99	68	−1
Movement for Rights and Freedoms	366,310	16.56	47	+11
We Continue the Change – Democratic Bulgaria	307,849	13.92	39	−25
Revival	295,915	13.38	38	+1
BSP for Bulgaria	151,560	6.85	19	−4
There is Such a People	128,007	5.79	16	+5
Greatness	99,862	4.52	13	New
Morality, Unity, Honour	63,992	2.89	0	New
Blue Bulgaria	33,613	1.52	0	New
Solidary Bulgaria	31,476	1.42	0	New
Center	25,664	1.16	0	New
VMRO – Bulgarian National Movement	21,272	0.96	0	0
The Left!	15,175	0.69	0	0
Bulgarian Rise	12,322	0.56	0	0
Green Movement	9,324	0.42	0	0
People's Voice	6,560	0.30	0	0
We Are Coming	5,939	0.27	0	New
Party of the Greens	5,494	0.25	0	0
Direct democracy	5,207	0.24	0	0
Unification	5,206	0.24	0	New
We the Citizens	4,662	0.21	0	New
Bulgarian Voice	3,378	0.15	0	New
Citizens Bloc	3,003	0.14	0	New
People's Party "Truth and Only the Truth"	2,483	0.11	0	0
Neutral Bulgaria	2,462	0.11	0	0
Rose Coalition	2,206	0.10	0	New
Society for a New Bulgaria	2,249	0.10	0	0
Bulgarian National Union – New Democracy	2,128	0.10	0	0
For a Great Bulgaria	1,893	0.09	0	New
Bulgarian Union for Direct Democracy	946	0.04	0	0
Bulgarian National Unification	920	0.04	0	0
None of the above	63,913	2.89	–	–
Total	2,211,648	100.00	240	0
Valid votes	2,211,648	97.42		
Invalid/blank votes	58,496	2.58		
Total votes	2,270,144	100.00		
Registered voters/turnout	6,594,076	34.43		
Source: Central Electoral Commission

== Aftermath ==
GERB–SDS leader Boyko Borisov thanked voters for the party's performance in the election. Kiril Petkov conceded and announced PP–DB would form a constructive opposition to the government once it is formed.

Both Korneliya Ninova, the leader of the BSP, and Hristo Ivanov, leader of DB!, resigned following the results.

The new elected 50th Parliament replaced the 49th Parliament, when all elected members were sworn in on 19 June 2024.

=== Coalition negotiations ===
The leader of the DPS, Delyan Peevski, called for discussions between all "Euro-Atlantic" parties.

GERB said that they were seeking to form an "expert" government and dominate key ministries, including the office of Prime Minister. However, Borisov announced that he did not want the position. The BSP leadership suggested they could support an expert cabinet.

The Bulgarian newspaper Dnevnik set out the following scenarios:

Coalition	Projected seats	Status in the National Assembly	Notes
GERB+DPS		Minority (115 of 240)	
GERB+DPS+ITN		Majority (131 of 240)	
GERB+BSP+ITN		Minority (103 of 240)	All parties support an "expert cabinet"
Caretaker government	N/A	N/A	New elections in Autumn

The caretaker government in place ahead of the election, will continue as caretaker government after the election, until the point of time it can be replaced by a new government. As regulated by the Bulgarian Constitution, the first negotiation mandate to try form a new government will automatically be given to the largest elected party (GERB–SDS), and if this attempt fails the second negotiation mandate to try form a new government will then automatically be given to the second largest elected party (DPS). If no government can be formed within the first or the second mandate, then the Bulgarian President will give a third mandate to an elected parliamentary party at his discretion. If the third mandate also fails to form a government, then a caretaker government will be appointed by the President and new snap parliamentary elections shall be scheduled within two months after its inauguration.

==== First negotiation mandate ====
On 17 June GERB began the negotiations with other parties within the first negotiation mandate, inviting all to discussions over the following two days. The framework for the first negotiation mandate, was the GERB–SDS proposal to form an expert cabinet on their mandate; and with GERB–SDS representatives occupying the positions of prime minister (although not being their party leader Boyko Borisov), foreign minister, and defence minister. PP–DB, BSPzB and VAZ refused to attend the negotiations, so there was only a meeting between GERB and DPS on the first day; both parties suggested they would be ready to form a government in coalition. On the second day, only ITN joined the talks, but only to declare they would neither back a government formed within the first nor the second negotiation mandate (led by GERB–SDS or DPS). ITN clarified they would under no circumstances support the formation of a GERB-DPS government or a GERB-DPS-ITN government; meaning that ITN would only support the formation of a politically neutral expert cabinet within the third negotiation mandate (preferably backed by all parties), and hoped to be selected as the party in charge of the third negotiation mandate to form such a government.

On 20 June GERB, DPS and ITN all supported the GERB candidate for the Speaker of the National Assembly, Raya Nazaryan. One VAZ member also voted for her, but the rest of the party abstained. Borisov had declared that there would be new elections if she failed to be elected.

There were also reports that 5 or 6 of the Velichie deputies could split off to support a GERB-DPS government, which could give it a narrow majority.

On 24 June President Rumen Radev started the consultations about the next steps in the government formation process, with all Parliamentary Groups invited for meetings in the order of their elected size. GERB–SDS, DPS, PP–DB were consulted on 24 June; VAZ and BSPzB were consulted on 25 June; while ITN and Velichie were consulted on 26 June. PP–DB confirmed their initial stance, that they in no circumstances would be part of nor support a GERB/DPS government; but thought GERB/DPS now should be granted time by Radev to investigate if it was possible to form a government with other parliamentary parties under a first or second negotiation mandate – and in the event of formation of such a government then PP–DB would play the role of being a constructive opposition party. PP–DB remained silent on how they would position themselves in case a potential third negotiation mandate should be needed during the attempts to form a government, "because it would be wrong [speaking about a third mandate], considering that the first two mandates are still coming up" and as of now "everything possible should be done to fulfill the first or second mandate".

On 1 July President Radev formally asked GERB-SDS to form a minority government with former National Assembly speaker Rosen Zhelyazkov as prime-minister designate. The minority government proposed by Zhelyazkov was largely composed of ministers from previous GERB governments, while also including several incumbent Caretaker Ministers. After the first mandate was received by Zhelyazkov, Boyko Borisov stated that if the government was approved without clear political support, it would only undertake urgent priority tasks before resigning. On 3 July, the National Assembly voted 138–98 to reject the proposed government.

Investiture; Rosen Zhelyazkov (GERB)
Ballot →	3 July 2024
Required majority →	absolute majority among present MPs (120 of 238)
Yes: • GERB-SDS (68); • DPS (30)	98 / 240
No: • PP–DB (38); • VAZ (38); • BSPzB (17); • ITN (16); • DPS (14); • Velichie (13); • Independent (2)	138 / 240
Abstentions: • DPS (1); • PP–DB (1)	2 / 240
Absentees: • DPS (1); • BSPzB (1)	2 / 240
Result →	No
Source: BTA

==== Second negotiation mandate ====
The second cabinet-forming negotiation mandate was as a consequence instead granted to the second-largest PP–DB on 22 July, but only to be returned immediately as an unsuccessful attempt.

==== Third negotiation mandate ====
President Radev granted the third and final negotiation mandate to ITN on 29 July, who attempted to form a neutral, Euro-Atlantic, expert government.

ITN had the support of 66 MPs, including its own, independents formerly aligned with Velichie and DPS, as well as BSP. PP–DB also considered supporting the proposal.

The mandate was unsuccessfully returned on 5 August, which paved the way for Radev to appoint a caretaker government and schedule new snap parliamentary elections within two months after its inauguration.

=== Changes in the Assembly's composition ===
One MP was expelled from the BSP by its national council on 18 June, before being sworn in.

The Velichie parliamentary group comprised 13 MPs after the election. On 5 July, six MPs broke away from the group, dissolving it.

A rift in DPS surrounding Delyan Peevski saw 17 MPs expelled and a further eight leave.

=== Caretaker government ===
In order to appoint a caretaker government, President Radev had to find a candidate for Prime Minister. Initially, the GERB speaker of the Assembly, Raya Nazaryan, was reported as being an option, but she declared she did not wish to be a candidate. The incumbent caretaker prime minister, Dimitar Glavchev, however confirmed that he was ready to stay in office if President Radev offered to reappoint him for a second term. Radev held consultations on forming an interim government with all parliamentary groups on 8 August.

On 9 August Radev appointed Goritsa Grancharova-Kozhareva, Vice President of the Bulgarian National Audit Office, as the next caretaker prime minister. Grancharova-Kozhareva was granted ten days to form a proposal for the next caretaker government to be appointed on 20 August 2024, which would put the date of the next election as 20 October 2024. On 19 August, Radev refused to appoint the government, as he opposed the proposal to allow the controversial figure Kalin Stoyanov to continue as interior minister. As such, the Glavchev government is continuing its duties and the election is postponed until a caretaker government is approved. This has been reported to be a potential constitutional crisis, with some scholars arguing Radev does not have the power to refuse the appointment of a caretaker government. On 27 August, President Radev issued a decree instead to appoint the Second Glavchev Government as the next caretaker government to replace the First Glavchev Government (with 17 out of 20 ministers being reappointed), and scheduled a new round of early parliamentary elections to be held on 27 October 2024.
