= Kalin Stoyanov =

Bulgarian politician (born 1981)

- Калин Стоянов
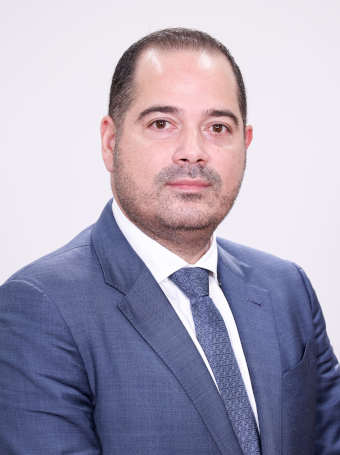
- Official portrait, 2024

Minister of Interior
- In office 6 June 2023 – 27 August 2024
- Prime Minister: Nikolai Denkov; Dimitar Glavchev
- Preceded by: Ivan Demerdzhiev
- Succeeded by: Atanas Ilkov

Member of the National Assembly
- Incumbent
- Assumed office 11 November 2024
- Prime Minister: Dimitar Glavchev
- Constituency: 2nd MMC – Burgas

Head of the General Directorate for Combatting Organised Crime
- In office 31 May 2021 – 6 June 2023
- Preceded by: Lyubomir Yanev
- Succeeded by: Yavor Serafimov

Personal details
- Born: Kalin Gergiev Stoyanov; 28 April 1981 (age 45) Burgas, PR Bulgaria
- Party: Independent
- Other political affiliations: DPS - A New Beginning
- Spouse: Venelina Stoyanova
- Education: Academy of the Ministry of Interior; Burgas Free University
- Occupation: Law-enforcement worker; politician

Kalin Georgiev Stoyanov (Bulgarian: Калин Георгиев Стоянов, born 28 April 1981) is a Bulgarian law enforcement worker and politician who was the Minister of Interior in the Denkov and First Glavchev Caretaker Government. A political independent, he has worked for the Ministry of Interior since 2003, holding the position of head of the General Directorate Combatting Organised Crime between 2021 and 2023.

== Early life and education ==
He was born on 28 April 1981, in Burgas. In 2003, he graduated with a bachelor's degree from the academy of the Ministry of Interior in Sofia. He also received a master's degree in law from the Burgas Free University in 2009.

== Career in the Ministry of Interior ==
Between 2003 and 2009, Stoyanov worked as an employee in the "Economic Police" department of the Burgas Oblast Directorate of the Ministry of Interior.

Between 2009 and 2011, he worked for the Territorial Branch of the Directorate Combatting Organised Crime for Burgas, as well as the Regional Committee for Combatting human trafficking.

From 2011 to 2016, Stoyanov worked in the "Special Operations" department within the General Directorate Combating Organized Crime (GDCOC), which in the period between 2013 and 2015 operated within the structure of DANS.

Stoyanov took his first leadership role within the Ministry of Interior in 2016, when he was appointed as head of the Regional Department "Primorsko" within the Burgas Oblast Directorate of the Ministry of Interior.

He received a new leadership role in 2018, when he was appointed to the position of Head of "Special Operations" within the GDCOC.

=== Head of the GDCOC ===
In 2021, Kalin Stoyanov was appointed as head of the GDCOC by Caretaker Minister of Interior in the Yanev Government, Boyko Rashkov, replacing Lyubomir Yanev. The head of the GDCOC is often referred to as the "number one anti-mafia fighter", due to the organisations role in prosecuting Bulgarian mafia members.

On 11 December 2021, a prosecutor dealing with the case of Borislav Kralev, who was accused of money laundering as part of the construction of the Hemus motorway, accused Stoyanov of attempting to intimidate him in order to make him approve the defense's requests. Soon after, the Sofia-City Prosecutors Office claimed to have gathered enough evidence in order to begin a court case. The allegations presented by the prosecutor have been denied by Stoyanov. The case was ultimately never prosecuted in court and was officially dropped on 5 June 2023.

== Minister of the Interior ==
=== Denkov Government ===
Kalin Stoyanov was announced as the nominee for the position of minister of interior in the Denkov Government on 1 June 2023. Assuming the role of minister of the interior on 6 June, following the successful investiture vote of the proposed government.

In an appearance with outgoing caretaker minister of the interior, Demerdzhiev, Stoyanov highlighted his long period of service within the Ministry of Interior and expressed hope that the Ministry would not be affected by political disputes. Stoyanov put reducing traffic accidents, tackling crime in smaller population centers and dealing with migration as his three main priorities. In his public appearances, he also made clear that reducing corruption was another key goal within his strategy.

One of the key challenges which Stoyanov faced in his first few months were demands by the syndicate of the workers of the Ministry of Interior for a 10% wage increase. Stoyanov indicated his support the proposed wage-raise and promised to defend the syndicate's interests during the drafting of the budget for 2024. However, the 10% wage increase was ultimately not approved by the cabinet.

Stoyanov also undertook changes within the regional headquarters of the Ministry of Interior, appointing new people. The changes led to accusations of a purge by previous minister, Demerdzhiev. Stoyanov, for his part, denied this, and justified the changes due to the necessity of a new leadership team.

The Ministry was able to celebrate some early successes, such as the extradition and arrest of controversial Bulgarian businessman, Vasil Bozhkov, who had been wanted for his connections with organised crime.

==== Assassination of Aleksei Petrov & Removal of Petar Todorov ====
On 16 August, Bulgarian businessman, Aleksei Petrov, was assassinated, causing shock within Bulgarian society.

The assassination prompted a convention of national security meeting by Denkov, which included Stoyanov. Following the meeting, Denkov announced that at Stoyanov's request the government would request the removal of the secretary to the minister of the interior, Petar Todorov, due to a loss of confidence. This request was turned down by President Rumen Radev, who accused the government of trying to take over the country's security services.

On 23 August, Stoyanov held a press briefing in which he officially presented his reasoning behind the request for Todorov's removal. He argued that Todorov had overseen an increase in crime and had made oversights leading to the mishandling of criminal cases. Further, he accused Todorov of being partially responsible for the death of 6 police officers due to fostering an environment of disorganisation.

Despite Radev's refusal to approve his removal, Todorov ended up resigning on 30 August, accusing Stoyanov of slandering him, as well as creating an untenable work environment. His place was taken by Zhivko Kotsev.

==== Local Elections ====
Prior to the 2023 Bulgarian local elections, Stoyanov underlined that the Ministry of Interior had taken clear steps to prevent vote buying and preserve public order. In an interview shortly after the first round election, he confirmed that most major political parties had engaged in vote buying and that there had been an unprecedented number of complaints about violations of electoral law.

==== Bulgarian Football Union Protests ====
On 16 November, a scheduled protest by Bulgarian football fans against the Bulgarian Football Union, and specifically its president, Borislav Mihaylov turned violent, causing widespread property damage in Sofia, as well as injuries to both protestors and police personnel. The protest was accompanied with videos of alleged police brutality against protestors, which outraged certain sections of civil society.

On 17 November, one of the governing parties, PP–DB, demanded Kalin Stoyanov's resignation, accusing him of being responsible for the use of violent methods by police. Key PP–DB figures further claimed that Stoyanov had been presented by GERB, and that they were therefore politically responsible for his actions. Prime Minister, Nikolai Denkov, while not explicitly supporting his party's position, made it clear that he believed he had made an oversight in not managing the situation seriously enough, further revealing that Stoyanov had been in the cinema during the protests. Other political forces supporting the government, GERB and DPS, expressed support for Stoyanov and instead blamed other figures (such as the Minister of Sport and the Sofia Police Department) for their management of the protests.

Responding to calls for his resignation on the 17th of November, Stoyanov defended the actions of the Ministry of Interior when handling the process and made clear that he did not intend to resign. In an interview, on the 19th of November, Stoyanov, while admitting that the police response to the protests may have at times been excessive, accused PP co-leader, Kiril Petkov, for attempting to influence appointments within the Ministry of Interior. He further confirmed that he had been invited into the government personally by Petkov.

The conflict between Petkov and Stoyanov carried on into 21 November, when the two engaged in a verbal altercation during Nova's morning talk show "Wake Up, Bulgaria". Later that day, Stoyanov held a media briefing in which he announced that three police officers had been fired for their role in the clashes, and that investigations into allegations of abuse of power were ongoing. He also once again accused Kiril Petkov of attempting to meddle in the affairs of the Ministry. Shortly after the briefing, PM Denkov held a press conference of his own in which he expressed support for Stoyanov's actions, however, Denkov made clear that if more meaningful change does not take place he would tenure the government's resignation.

Stoyanov testified before the Parliamentary Internal Security Commission on 22 November. In his testimony, he expressed regret about the use of force by certain police officers. However, he generally defended measures undertaken by the Sofia Police and blamed the Sofia Municipality for permitting the protest without proper regulations, such as allowing the famously rival fan groups of Levski and CSKA Sofia to march in one column.

On 1 December, Kalin Stoyanov's chief of staff, Vasil Krastev, resigned, following a publication by the newspaper Capital alleging a connection between Krastev and controversial Bulgarian politician, Delyan Peevski.

Stoyanov further played an important role in negotiations for Bulgaria's entrance into the Schengen Area.

==== Assassination of Martin Bozhanov ====
On 1 February, Martin Bozhanov, also known as "The Notary, a figure who was under investigation for property fraud, money laundering and threatening prosecutors, was assassinated. His assassination triggered a re-opening of societal discussions about the power of the Bulgarian mafia, as well as its links to state figures.

In the days following Bozhanov's assassination, it was revealed that his wife, Gergana, had worked for the GCOC, although she was subsequently fired by Kalin Stoyanov during his Directorship. It was additionally suspected by some media outlets that Martin Bozhanov may have worked with the Ministry of Interior as an informant. Other media outlets suggested that Bozhanov may have been a protected witness set to testify against another suspected member of the Bulgarian Mafia, known under the name "Pepi Evro". On the 7th of February, police officers searched the premises of a club connected with Bozhanov, called SS. Stoyanov has refused to confirm or deny these reports.

In a press briefing on 4 February, Stoyanov stated that solving the case of Bozhanov's murder was a key priority for the Ministry. On the 8th of February, testifying before the Parliamentary Committee for Internal Security & Order, Stoyanov stated that Bozhanov had been investigated by the GDCOC as early as 2021, during his tenure as director. He also promised to provide the parliamentary commission investigating the death of Bozhanov with a report about the evidence the Ministry of Interior held about Bozhanov and his associates.

Despite the ministries declared efforts, former Minister of the Interior and PP MP, Boyko Rashkov, accused Kalin Stoyanov of being connected with Bozhanov and of having leaked information to him as director of the GDCOC. Stoyanov has denied these accusations and instead has underlined the GDCOC's role in collecting evidence against Bozhanov. In a statement to the media on the 28th of February, he also denied allegations brought forth by Rashkov and others that there was evidence of the involvement of acting General Prosecutor, Borislav Serafov, with either Bozhanov or Petrov-Evroto.

On 6 March, Stoyanov order an investigation into whether Bozhanov's club had received informal police protection.

During a closed session of the parliamentary committee investigating the death of Martin Bozhanov, Stoyanov allegedly did not confirm nor deny the rumours that Bozhanov had been working for the Ministry prior to his assassination.

==== Tenure as Acting Minister ====
On 5 March, the Denkov Government resigned, as necessitated by the governing deal between PPDB and GERB which necessitated a rotation between incumbent Prime Minister Nikolai Denkov from PPDB and the Deputy Prime Minister, Mariya Gabriel from GERB. In his report following the government's resignation, Stoyanov generally categorised his Ministership as a success, highlighting the increasing equipment available to the border guard service, successful endeavors in reducing traffic accidents and digitalisation of certain Ministry of Interior processes.

In the period as acting Minister, Stoyanov dealt with allegations that Bulgaria had agreed to accept deported immigrants from Austria, which may have included criminals, a claim that Stoyanov denied. The topic increased in relevance after a number of violent confrontations between groups of Bulgarian young men and groups which included young men of migrant origin took place in the center of Sofia on the 9 March. In a Facebook post on the 10 March, Stoyanov argued that there was no evidence that the confrontations were motivated by racial or ethnic tensions. Further, in the days following he announced that security had been increased in central Sofia.

Stoyanov was a contentious minister during the negotiations between PP-DB and GERB for the rotation, as PPDB had previously withdrawn their confidence from him in November. Yet, despite this, Stoyanov was included in the government presented by Mariya Gabriel on 19 March.

In a press briefing on the 24 March, Gabriel announced that negotiations with PPDB had broken down after PPDB demanded the removal of Kalin Stoyanov as Minister of the Interior. In a media comment on the 26th of March, Stoyanov claimed that he was not aware that PP-DB had presented such a demand during negotiations and once again re-iterated the claim that he had been invited into the government by Kiril Petkov.

=== Glavchev Caretaker Government ===
==== Re-Appointment to Caretaker Government ====
Following the collapse of the Denkov government, Caretaker PM Dimitar Glavchev began interviews with prospective Cabinet Ministers, including incumbent ministers. On the 2nd of April, he met with representatives of the Syndicate of the Ministry of Interior, who published a position supporting Stoyanov. On 5 April, Glavchev confirmed that he intended to retain Kalin Stoyanov within the Caretaker Government, although he made clear that the decision was a difficult one and was motivated primarily by disruptions within the Ministry of Interior in the past few days. Glavchev's decision was met with opposition from PP-DB and other parliamentary parties, who claimed that Stoyanov was incapable of guaranteeing free and fair elections. Additionally, protests were organised by civil society organisations against the appointment.

Despite this, Kalin Stoyanov was sworn in as Caretaker Minister of the Interior together with other members of the Glavchev Government on the 9th of April.

==== Customs Agency Scandal ====
On 4 April, shortly after searches took place in the buildings of the Ministry of Interior and Customs Agency, as well as the arrests of notable members of the Customs Agency leadership due to charges of participation in a cigarette smuggling band, the Secretary of the Ministry of Interior, Zhivko Kotsev, unexpectedly resigned. Commenting on the sudden resignation and public disappearance of Zhivko Kotsev, Stoyanov stated that to his knoweledge he had tenured his resignation willingly.

On 5 April, Kotsev appeared in an emergency briefing with acting Prime Minister Nikolay Denkov, during which he announced that his resignation had been coerced by a "high ranking Minister" and the acting General Prosecutor, Borislav Serafov. Furthermore, acting Prime Minister Nikolay Denkov implicated Kalin Stoyanov personally as the figure who had intimidated Kotsev.

In the following days, evidence leaked from the investigation into the contraband network in the Customs Agency, increasingly implicated Zhivko Kotsev as a participant.

On 10 April, citing the negative impact on the reputation of the Ministry from Kotsev's actions, Stoyanov formally requested his removal as Secretary, with the request being approved by President Radev on the same day.

On 11 April, Stoyanov appeared before the temporary committee of the National Assembly meant to investigate the circumstances of the affair, as well as the potential role of Finance Minister, Assen Vassilev, within it. In his testimony, he denied the allegations that he had pressured Kotsev into tenuring his resignation, and claimed that Kotsev had not been transparent about the nature of the investigation into his person. He further admitted that he had been questioned by the Prosecutors Office in relation to the case, and underlined that he had been questioned about the reshuffles within the Regional Ministry Headquarters in Haskovo Province. Specifically, Stoyanov recounted an incident wherein Finance Minister Assen Vassilev allegedly attempted to pressure him into making changes within the regional structures in Haskovo, which he had refused. He admitted that he had been acquainted with two of the key figures in the Customs Agency investigation- Stefan and Martin Dimitrov's- however highlighted that the acquaintance had been made through former Minister of the Interior, Boyko Rashkov. He further alleged that Boyko Rashkov had organised various parties, during which plans were made to discredit Stoyanov's reputation and disrupt his Ministership.

Boyko Rashkov has accused Stoyanov of himself being involved in the contraband group and also accused him of not properly investigating the assassination of Martin "The Notary" Bozhanov.

Further, the former head of the Auto-transport Control Service for Sofia, Tencho Tenev, claimed that Stefan Dimitrov had been in contact with Kalin Stoyanov before being introduced to Boyko Rashkov. He also asserted that the Dimitrov's called Stoyanov a "friend" in personal conversations. Stoyanov, for his part, denied the allegations and claimed that Tenev was part of a group which had planned and organised a campaign to discredit him.

==== BIRD investigation and Dimitar Stoyanov arrest ====
Throughout early April, the investigative newspaper, BIRD, published a series of articles by journalists Dimitar Stoyanov and Atanas Chobanov that claimed to demonstrate a connection between Stoyanov and the recently assassinated Martin Bozhanov. In turn, Stoyanov initially sued the journalists for reputational damage.

On 23 April, journalist Dimitar Stoyanov was arrested after revealing a fire-arm during an altercation with a civil servant from the Tax Revenues Agency; an arrest that he alleged was connected to his investigation into Stoyanov. On the 24th, in response to the arrest of Stoyanov, BIRD published an investigative article which had been written by the journalist, which alleged that Stoyanov's former brother-in-law had engaged in racketeering and may have received informal police protection from Stoyanov. Stoyanov, for his part, denied that Dimitar Stoyanov had been arrested due to his investigative journalism and denied having any connections with his former brother-in-law since at least 2009.

==== Organisation of Elections ====
As Caretaker Minister of the Interior, Kalin Stoyanov was responsible for supervising and assisting in organising the irregular elections and the European Parliament election in Bulgaria. In a press briefing on the 20th of April, Stoyanov announced the beginning of the Ministries effort to carry out the elections and denied accusations by political parties that he was unfit for the role.

In a speech before the national convention of the Ministry and other law enforcement agencies prior to the beginning of the official campaign period, Stoyanov lamented that the Ministry was there to work for all Bulgarian citizens and did not service the interests of any political party.

On 17 May, Stoyanov reported that 46 signals has been received about vote buying, out of which 16 have had criminal cases prepared.

By the end of the campaign, Stoyanov stated that the election campaign and election day had taken place in a calm environment. He further reported that the Ministry had received 583 signals about electoral law violations (specifically, vote-buying) which was 100 less compared to the prior election.

==== Post-Election Activity ====
On 24 June, the internationally wanted Bulgarian criminal, Evelin "Brendo" Banev, surprisingly turned himself in to the police after being in hiding for almost 6 years. This led to questions about how he had managed to return into the country, undetected by law enforcement agencies. Testifying before the National Assembly, Stoyanov stated that according to the information in the Ministry, Evelin Banev likely returned in the summer of 2022, on an illicit flight, during the tenure of former Minister Boyko Rashkov.

On 1 July, Stoyanov was nominated for the position of Minister of the Interior in the proposed Zhelyazkov Cabinet. Commenting his nomination, Stoyanov insisted that he was not a partisan figure and had only agreed to the nomination due to shared priorities with the proposed Prime Minister. The project-cabinet and Zhelyazkov's candidacy ultimately failed to gather a parliamentary majority.

On 11 July, PP-DB formally requested the resignation of Kalin Stoyanov, following the beating of two young men in the town of Sozopol by a police officer, to which the Ministry had not responded adequately according to PP-DB. Stoyanov claimed that calls for his resignation were part of a broader attempt to discredit the Ministry by PP-DB and stated that the Ministry had suspended and intended to prosecute the perpetrator.

Kalin Stoyanov appeared before the temporary investigative commission of the National Assembly looking into Ivelin Mihaylov. In his testimony, Stoyanov stated that the Ministry had received 26 signals since 2016 implicating Mihaylov in various (primarily financial) crimes.

==== Forest Fires Crisis ====
In early July, extreme heat in Bulgaria contributed to the outbreak of forest fires, particularly in the southern regions of the country near the border with Greece and Republic of North Macedonia. The fires were especially intense in the village of Voden.

By 17 July, Stoyanov claimed that the fire fighting services had managed to contain the fires around Voden, and praised the Ministry for their urgent response in evacuating the local population. On the 19th of July, while visitting Voden, Stoyanov reported that the Ministry was receiving a report of wild-fires almost every 20 minutes. Further, he accused the media of overemphasising the victims of property damage and of not covering the successful measures taken by the ministry.

The handling of the forest fires by Stoyanov led to calls for his resignation from PP-DB and Revival. While visitting the village of Otets Paisevo in Plovdiv, Stoyanov, while admitting that the early warning systems may be improved and the staff of fire-fighters expanded, generally defended the Ministries response and made clear that he did not intend to resign. A number of political figures, specifically GERB leader, Boyko Borisov and DPS-Peevski leader, Delyan Peevski, supported Stoyanov's position. Caretaker PM, Dimitar Glavchev, similarly stated that he did not see a reason for the removal of Stoyanov from the cabinet.

==== Elin Pelin warehouse disaster ====
On July 25, explosions took place at a pyrotechnic equipment warehouse in the town of Elin Pelin. Stoyanov arrived on the scene on the day, in order to coordinate the response of the ministry to the explosion.

Commenting the incident on the next morning, Stoyanov confirmed at least one death due to the incident in the warehouses. He further criticised the incumbent mayor of Elin Pelin, who had been on vacation in Greece and had allegedly made statements criticising the work of the Ministry of Interior.

Commenting the disaster on 29 July, Stoyanov confirmed that minor explosions were still taking place at the site of the warehouse. He further criticised the a witness of the event who had criticised the work of the Ministry for reporting his views to TV agencies, rather than to representatives of the Ministry.

On 8 August, following the relative end of the fires, Stoyanov promised a comprehensive investigation into the cause of the explosions and future prevention of such disasters.

==== End of First Glavchev Government ====
By the beginning of August, government negotiations for the formation of a regular cabinet had ended unsuccessful, with the third mandate being returned unfulfilled, thus meaning the end of the First Glavchev Government. On the 9th of August, it was announced by President Radev that he had selected Goritsa Grancharova, deputy head of the Chamber of Audit, as the new Caretaker PM, in place of Dimitar Glavchev.

Shortly after her selection, Stoyanov commented that he believed there was pressure on Grancharova in order to remove him from the cabinet.

On 12 August, a protest in support of Stoyanov was organised by the Syndicate of the workers of the Ministry of Interior, which was personally attended by him.

On 13 August, Stoyanov visitted Plovdiv, where he fired 4 senior officers in the local structures due to the death of a local police officer.

On 14 August, Stoyanov met with PM-Candidate, Grancharova, with the meeting accompanied by another protest of the Syndicate of the Ministry.

On 16 August, Stoyanov accused PP-DB MP, Bozhidar Bozhanov, of meddling in the affairs of the GDCOC after he denounced the organisation for taking down the satirical website, "A New Beginning".

On 19 August, Grancharova officially presented her caretaker cabinet. President Radev, however, made clear that he would not sign the decree appointing the proposed caretaker cabinet due to the controversial nomination of Kalin Stoyanov for Minister of the Interior. Radev gave Grancharova an ultimatum to nominate another, less controversial person to the position in the next three hours. This offer was rejected by Grancharova who defended Kalin Stoyanov's record as Minister of Interior and claimed that Radev's proposed time frame was not adequate. She added that she had carried out her constitutional duties and had made every effort to form a government. Stoyanov denounced Radev's decision and thanked Grancharova for nominating him.

A protest was organised in front of the Presidency by the Syndicate of the Ministry, which was joined by Stoyanov. During the protest, Stoyanov raised his fist outside the Presidential building, a move that resembled an action taken by President Radev during the 2020–2021 Bulgarian protests and led GERB leader Boyko Borisov, to call for Stoyanov's resignation.

Speaking on 21 August, Stoyanov claimed that his raised fist was a greeting to other Ministry workers, and not a political statement, and reaffirmed his view that he should remain Caretaker Minister of the Interior.

On 22 August, Radev gave the mandate for the formation of the Caretaker Cabinet to incumbent Caretaker Prime Minister Glavchev, implying during their meeting that Stoyanov should be removed.

On 26 August, it was confirmed that Stoyanov would be replaced by head of the "Main Directorate 'National Police'", Atanas Ilkov, as Caretaker Minister of the Interior in the Second Glavchev Government. During the transition of power between the two, Stoyanov lamented that he faced intense political pressure, which he asserted that he managed to withstand, and called on Ilkov to assure that the Ministry was not taken over by any political forces.

== Post-ministerial political career ==
=== Member of Parliament ===
Prior to Stoyanov's removal as Caretaker Minister of Interior, chairman of DPS, Delyan Peevski, promised to nominate him as a candidate in the upcoming elections. Stoyanov thanked Peevski for his offer, although emphasised that he had received invitations for political participation from other parties and remained focused on his role within the Ministry of Interior.

On 22 September, it was announced that Kalin Stoyanov was second on the list of DPS – A New Beginning in the Burgas Constituency and led the list in Sofia-Oblast constituency. He justified his decision to enter electoral politics by citing the need to defend his record as minister and defeat those who he believed had unjustifiably orchestrated his removal. Stoyanov further claimed that he remained an apolitical expert and that he had been chosen as part of the "civic quota".

Stoyanov was elected to the 51st National Assembly and chose to represent the Burgas MMC. He was sworn in as an MP on 11 November and sat with the DPS - NN group in parliament.

Stoyanov has expressed his support for Delyan Peevski and confirmed that he would stand as a candidate-MP for the party if new elections took place. He supported the formation of the Zhelyazkov Government, stating that Bulgaria needed a stable government.

Stoyanov was a vocal critic of President Rumen Radev. He was particularly critical of the President's visit to Varna, during which he accused the Presidential staff of creating severe traffic jams in the city. As a response, Stoyanov submitted a law which withdrew protection by the National Security Service (NSS) from members of the Presidential staff. The law was passed by the National Assembly on 3 October 2025.

He was nominated as a candidate by the DPS prior to the 2026 Bulgarian parliamentary election in the region of Burgas. During the election campaign, Stoyanov was a vocal critic of the Gyurov caretaker government, in particular criticising minister of the interior, Emil Dechev. He further accused former minister of the interior, and MP-candidate from Progressive Bulgaria, Ivan Demerdzhiev, of allegedly threatening DPS activists in Kardzhali, as well as using his influence to take over the local police departments.
