= Dimitar Glavchev =

Prime Minister of Bulgaria from 2024 to 2025

- Димитър Главчев
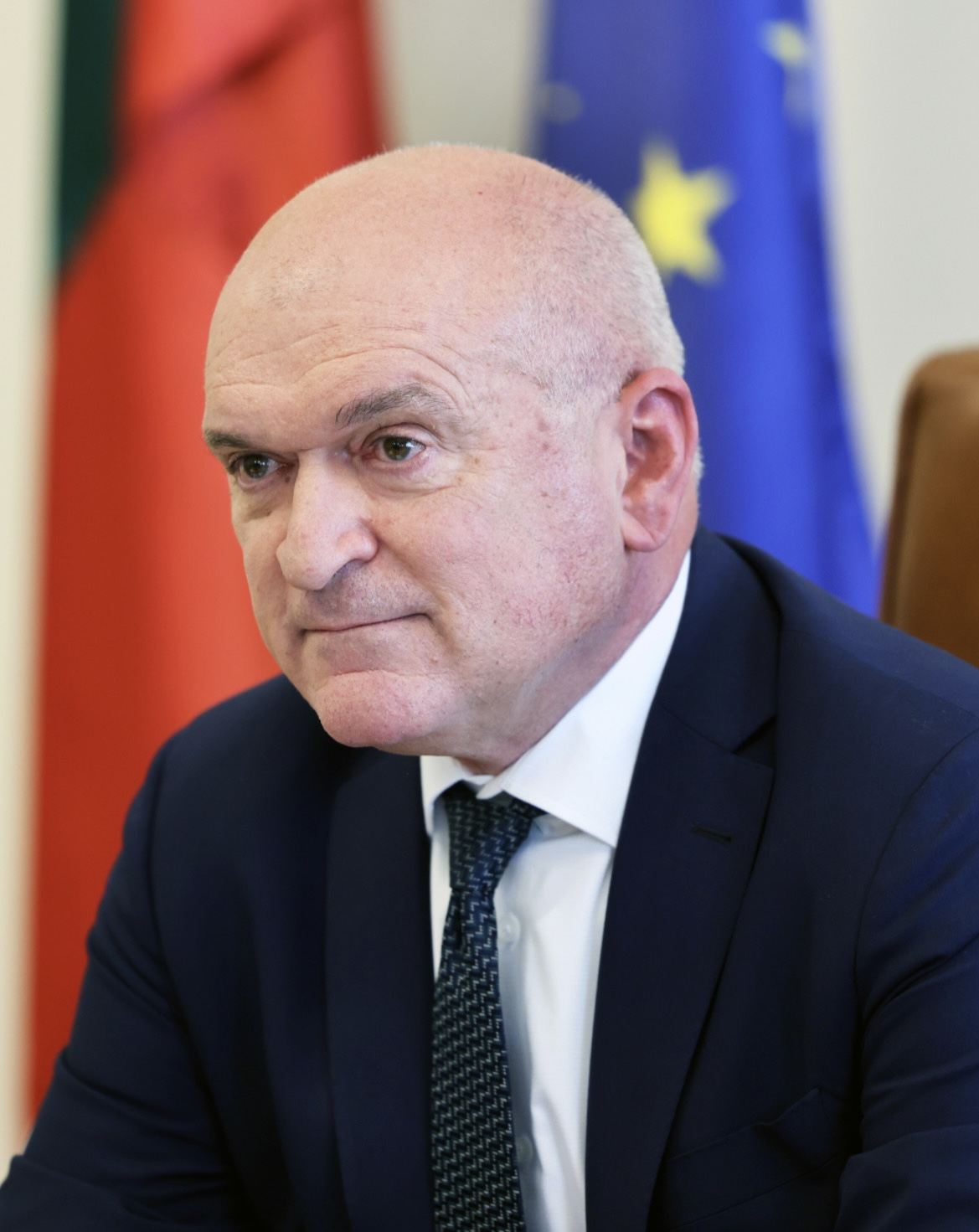
- Glavchev in 2024

Prime Minister of Bulgaria
- Caretaker (Note: Since the adoption of the 2023 constitutional reform, the prime minister named to conduct elections has the status of caretaker.); 9 April 2024 – 16 January 2025
- President: Rumen Radev
- Deputy: Lyudmila Petkova
- Preceded by: Nikolai Denkov
- Succeeded by: Rosen Zhelyazkov

Minister of Foreign Affairs
- In office 22 April 2024 – 27 August 2024
- Prime Minister: Himself
- Preceded by: Stefan Dimitrov
- Succeeded by: Ivan Kondov

Chairperson of the Chamber of Audit
- Incumbent
- Assumed office 26 July 2023
- Preceded by: Tsvetan Tsvetkov

Speaker of the National Assembly
- In office 19 April – 17 November 2017
- Preceded by: Tsetska Tsacheva
- Succeeded by: Tsveta Karayancheva

Member of the National Assembly
- In office 14 March 2009 – 15 November 2021
- Constituency: 23rd MMC – Sofia

Personal details
- Born: Dimitar Borisov Glavchev; 15 August 1963 (age 63) Sofia, PR Bulgaria
- Party: Independent (since 2023)
- Other political affiliations: GERB (until 2023)
- Spouse: Pavlina Andreeva (m. 1982)
- Children: 2
- Education: University of National and World Economy
- Occupation: Politician; accountant; auditor

Dimitar Borisov Glavchev (Bulgarian: Димитър Борисов Главчев; born 15 August 1963) is a Bulgarian politician who served as Prime Minister of Bulgaria from 2024 to 2025, leading a caretaker government. A political independent, he is currently the chairman of the Chamber of Audit. He was previously a member of the GERB party and served as member of the National Assembly from 2009 to 2021. In 2017, he briefly served as Speaker of the National Assembly.

== Early life, education and career ==
He was born on 15 August 1963, in Sofia. In 1981, Glavchev graduated from SOU "Dobriy Voynik" (then named "Mikhail Kalinin"). He graduated from the University of National and World Economy (then known as '"High Research Institute" Karl Marx') in 1987, with the professional qualification of "economist-accountant". He received a second degree from the university in "International Economic Relations".

Glavchev worked as a professional accountant for around 30 years, working 20 of them as an independent auditor.

== Parliamentary activity ==
Glavchev was elected in 2009, being part of the GERB parliamentary group in the 41st National Assembly. He served a further 5 terms as a MP, retiring after the 46th National Assembly.

In his tenure as a MP, Glavchev served in the Budget and Finance Committee. In this capacity, he helped develop the "Law on the Chamber of Audit" in 2010.

In 2011, he was appointed as deputy head of the GERB Parliamentary Group.

During the tenure of the 43rd National Assembly, he was elected as deputy speaker of the assembly, temporarily leading assembly sessions during the absence of incumbent speaker Tsetska Tsacheva.

In the 44th National Assembly, he headed the inter-parliamentary Bulgarian delegation to PACE.

Glavchev did not seek re-election during the Bulgarian legislative elections held in November, 2021.

=== Chairman of the National Assembly ===
Glavchev served as speaker of the 44th National Assembly between 18 April and 17 November 2017.

Glavchev resigned on 17 November, after a scandal with BSP leader, Korneliya Ninova, whom he forced to leave a session for 'insulting' Prime Minister Boyko Borisov in a declaration.

== Chairman of the Chamber of Audit ==
On 12 July 2023 Glavchev was nominated for the position of chairman of the Chamber of Audit by the GERB-SDS parliamentary group. He was elected to the position by the National Assembly with the support of 148 MPs on 26 July. On 31 July, Glavchev officially began his 7-year term, being welcomed by acting chairwoman of the Chamber of Audit, Goritsa Granzharova-Kozharova.

Glavchev's election was surrounded by some controversy, due to the fact that his predecessor, Tsvetan Tsvetkov, was unconstitutionally removed from his position.

== Caretaker Prime Minister (2024–2025) ==
=== Caretaker Government formation ===
On 28 March 2024, after the failure of government talks following the resignation of the Denkov Government, Glavchev attended a meeting with President Rumen Radev. According to the newly passed constitutional amendments, Glavchev, as the chairman of the Chamber of Audit, was eligible to be selected by the president to serve as the caretaker prime minister.

On 29 March, Radev announced Glavchev as the caretaker prime minister-designate, inviting him for another meeting on 30 March.

On 30 March, Radev officially presented Glavchev with the responsibility of forming a caretaker government, with Glavchev lamenting that while the position may be difficult, he would aim to form a politically neutral caretaker cabinet. In comments to the press following the meeting, he outlined that he will look for experts within the Ministries who had a "good reputation within society" and insisted that his cabinet would remain politically neutral and committed to "Euroatlanticist" values.

According to a bill passed by the National Assembly on 29 March, Glavchev was allowed to take an unpaid leave from the Chamber of Audit and then regain the position following his premiership.

On 5 April, Glavchev presented his Caretaker Cabinet prior during consultations with the parliamentary groups. The consultations were not attended by the BSP, and PP-DB left the consultations due to Glavchev's choice to keep incumbent Kalin Stoyanov as Minister of Interior in a caretaker capacity, as well as the appointment of other partisan figures. After the consultations, Glavchev characterised the choice of Stoyanov as "difficult", but justified it with the recent resignation of the secretary of the ministry of interior, Zhivko Kotsev, leaving few options within the present administration.

He was sworn in as caretaker prime minister in the presence of National Assembly on 9 April. During a joint press conference with outgoing prime minister, Nikolai Denkov, he vowed to insure fair elections and stability in Bulgaria.

=== Caretaker Prime Minister tenure ===
==== First Caretaker Government ====
During his first cabinet meeting, Glavchev declared that ensuring that free and fair elections took place was the main task of the Caretaker Cabinet.

Glavchev became the first caretaker prime minister in modern Bulgarian history to participate in a European Council meeting, with the role being previously fulfilled by the president of Bulgaria in periods with a Caretaker Cabinet. He also became the prime minister to have the largest amount of advisors, appointing 23.

Only a week after the appointment of the cabinet, Prime Minister Glavchev requested the removal of two Ministers: the minister of foreign Affairs, Stefan Dimitrov, and the Minister of Foods and Agriculture, Kiril Vutev, both of whom he accused of not properly fulfilling their roles. In their place, he proposed GERB MP, Daniel Mitov, as Minister of Foreign Affairs, and head of the State Fund "Agriculture", Georgi Tahov, as Minister of Agriculture.

After President Rumen Radev announced his opposition to the changes, Glavchev argued that it was the president's "constitutional duty" to approve them. In a follow up statement, he made clear that he was ready to discuss the re-shuffle with the president, however insisted that political responsibility for the two ministers in question would shift to him.

On 19 April, Glavchev met with the president to discuss the proposed reshuffle, following which he confirmed that no agreement had been reached and the current ministers would continue to implement their duties. A few hours after the meeting, Mitov declared that he did not intend to become caretaker Minister of Foreign Affairs, and Glavchev confirmed that he did not have an alternative candidate prepared for the position. On 20 April, Glavchev announced that he had proposed himself for the position of Caretaker Minister of Foreign Affairs.

On 22 April, Radev appointed Glavchev as Caretaker Minister of Foreign Affairs, after Glavchev sent an official request for the role. After assuming the role of Minister of Foreign Affairs, he appointed Ivan Kondov as his deputy and former foreign affairs minister in the Yanev Caretaker Government, Svetlan Stoev, as the new Secretary. Both appointees were tasked with coordinating elections abroad.

Following a scandal surrounding the governments decision to approve the construction of a private children's hospital in Sofia, Glavchev promised to alert the Prosecutors Office and even raised the possibility of removing the incumbent Minister of Healthcare.

During the spring session of the NATO Parliamentary Assembly, held in Sofia, Glavchev re-affirmed Bulgaria's commitment to supporting Ukraine and called for a greater NATO presence in the Black Sea region. Additionally, during a press conference with Secretary General of NATO, Jens Stoltenberg, he dismissed rumours that Bulgarian forces could be deployed in Ukraine.

On 29 May, a directive written by Glavchev in his capacity as foreign minister, which instructed the Bulgarian representative to abstain during a vote on the resolution to classify the Srebrenica massacre as a genocide, was leaked to the press. The directive was criticised by a number of major political parties, including PP-DB, BSP and ITN. An emergency session of parliament was called to hear Glavchev's about the topic of the second of June, however the session did not gather a quorum. Glavchev, for his part, while admitting the veracity of the directive, denied the existence of a scandal and instead claimed that the directive was part of the regular decision-making process within the foreign ministry.

On 5 June, Glavchev announced his intention for the parliament to decide who should lead the Bulgarian delegation to the NATO summit in July, unless a regular government had been formed. The parliament on 21 June proved unable to find a consensus on the matter, leading to the decision that both Glavchev and Radev would be present at the summit. However, Radev refused to lead the delegation due to disagreements with the cabinets position meaning that Glavchev was forced to assume leadership.

On 17 July, due to an increase in forest fires, Glavchev summouned a national security council to the cabinet. In the following days, he also visited the areas most affected by the fires, specifically the village Voden, where he promised to provide compensation to all victims. By the 2nd of August, Glavchev stated that the forest fires in the country had been mostly contained.

In July, Glavchev authorised a number of changes in the oblast executives. Some media outlets have connected the changes to the rift between Delyan Peevski and Ahmed Dogan within DPS, with it being alleged that the change of the Oblast-Executives of Kardzhali and Smolyan was part of a larger "purge" of pro-Dogan figures within the civil service. Such changes led to allegations by political parties in the National Assembly that Glavchev was being influenced by Delyan Peevski in making decisions. Glavchev has vehemently denied such allegations.

By the beginning of August, government negotiations for the formation of a regular cabinet had ended unsuccessful, with the third mandate being returned unfulfilled. This triggered speculation about whether Dimitar Glavchev will remain as caretaker prime minister or be replaced by another candidate provided by the recently passed constitutional amendments. Initially, however, Glavchev seemed to suggest that he was open to remaining in the role of caretaker prime minister if that was the president's choice.

On 9 August, President Radev officially announced that the deputy chairwoman of the Chamber of Audit, Goritsa Grancharova-Kozhareva, was selected to serve as the next caretaker prime minister in place of Glavchev. In a statement shortly thereafter, Glavchev said that he supported this change as he no longer wished to fulfil the role of caretaker prime minister due to the high degree of political polarisation and alleged slanderous insinuations against his person which he believed tarnished his reputation. He further confirmed that he would also relinquish his position as Caretaker Minister of Foreign Affairs and return to his position as Head of the Chamber of Audit.

On 19 August, following Radev's rejection of the Grancharova-Kozhareva Caretaker Cabinet, Glavchev indicated that he was willing to continue executing the role of Caretaker PM "as long as was necessary" in order to avoid the development of a constitutional crisis.

On 21 August, Glavchev attended a consultation with Radev, at which he expressed his willingness to remain as caretaker prime minister if that was the president's choice. Following the consultations, Radev announced that he had decided to renominate Glavchev for the position of Caretaker PM. On 22 August, Radev formally gave the mandate for Caretaker Government formation to Glavchev. During the meeting, Glavchev expressed his willingness to remove certain cabinet members, like Kalin Stoyanov, although he did not explicitly confirm it. He was given a five-day period in which to present his caretaker government, in order to allow for the snap parliamentary elections to be held on 27 October.

On 27 August, Glavchev's Second Caretaker Government was officially sworn in, having mostly the same composition with the exception of the notable replacement of Kalin Stoyanov with Atanas Ilkov.

==== Second Caretaker Government ====
Upon being officially re-appointed as caretaker prime minister, Glavchev held a meeting with the new Minister of Interior in order to re-affirm the importance of successfully organising free and fair elections. He further made clear that the Caretaker Cabinet would not interfere with the competencies of the Central Electoral Commission.

On 2 October, Glavchev summoned an in-cabinet security council in response to the escalation in the Middle East following Iranian strikes on Israel.

While voting in the October 2024 Bulgarian parliamentary election, Glavchev expressed hope that a regular government would be formed in order to stop the cycle of elections which had been on-going in the country for the past 3 years.

Following accusations by political that the caretaker cabinet had mishandled the elections after the publication of provisional results, Glavchev claimed that the government had done everything to insure that the integrity of the elections and that claims of vote-buying were greatly exaggerated. Speaking at a cabinet session on the 1st of November, Glavchev stated that the cabinet and security services had provided detailed reports about the conduct of the elections and that the caretaker cabinet would not get involved in any efforts to contest the elections. Commenting calls by political parties, as well as the president, for the resignation of caretaker Minister of Interior, Atanas Ilkov, Glavchev expressed his own personal confidence in the performance of Ilkov, yet did not exclude the possibility of a change in the ministry following consultations with the president.

As during the first Glavchev government, Glavchev was accused by certain political parties and media publications of demonstrating undue favouritism towards GERB and DPS-Peevski. Specifically, the decision by the caretaker cabinet to grant a government building on the street Vrachba as the new party office for DPS-Peevski within an expedited time frame was seen as a demonstration of such an attitude. Glavchev, for his part, claimed that the granting of a party office upon Peevski's request took place in full accordance with the law. He further denied all allegations of himself or the cabinet being the influence of any political parties.

In late November, Glavchev frequently visited the area around the Danube Bridge, in preparation for Bulgaria's full entrance into the Schengen Area, as well as to supervise ongoing repair efforts. He frequently emphasised the future economic benefits of full Schengen membership for Bulgaria. On 1 January 2025, Glavchev was present at the ceremonial opening of the border checkpoint on the Danube bridge.

On 2 December, Glavchev announced that the caretaker government was ready to submit a budget for 2025. On 10 December, he met with the chairwoman of the National Assembly, Nataliya Kiselova to discuss the budget, and affirmed that it fulfilled the requirements for Eurozone membership. In early January, the project-budget was submitted to the National Assembly, with Glavchev promising to withdraw the project if the deficit exceeded 3%.

On 18 December, prior to Glavchev's attendance of the European Council summit which included the signing of a 10-year long security cooperation agreement with Ukraine, he requested a formal mandate from the National Assembly in order to sign the document. The request was criticised by a range of parliamentary parties, particularly GERB, who accused him of attempting to sabotage government negotiations and of having a mandate to sign the document due to prior National Assembly decisions. Ultimately, the National Assembly did not vote on Glavchev's request, and Glavchev did not sign the security cooperation agreement with Ukraine, making Bulgaria the only EU nation except Hungary not to sign it. He justified his decision by stating that there was no National Assembly decision to ratify the document.

On 30 December, commenting the electricity shortages that impacted parts of the country, Glavchev characterised the situation as "unacceptable" and promised to provide 2 million Leva to support impacted citizens.

After the registration of the Old Calendar Bulgarian Orthodox Church, a splinter from the official Bulgarian Orthodox Church, Glavchev endorsed a National Assembly decision in order to prevent more than two religious organisations having the word "orthodox" in their name.

On 16 January, Rosen Zhelyazkov was elected as the new prime minister of Bulgaria, thus ending Glavchev's tenure. During the traditional transfer of power, he praised the accomplishments of his cabinet, especially given its caretaker status, and wished luck to the newly elected Prime Minister.

== Post-Prime Ministerial Career ==
=== Head of the Chamber of Audit ===
After the end of his tenure as caretaker prime minister, Dimitar Glavchev returned to his position as head of the Chamber of Audit. His return to the position was challenged by PP-DB, due to his tenure as caretaker Minister of Foreign Affairs creating a conflict of interest and violating the Law for the Chamber of Audit. The Anti-Corruption Agency stated that they did not find a reason Glavchev ineligible for the position. The Constitutional Court, on 16 September, refused to consider the case of Glavchev's ineligibility, stating it was outside their competence.

In November, 2025, Yes, Bulgaria! co-leader Ivaylo Mirchev accused Glavchev of receiving a bonus of 110,000 Leva from the Chamber of Audit while serving as caretaker prime minister. Glavchev has denied the allegation, stating that he did not receive any bonuses during his time as prime minister.

After the partial annulment of the snap parliamentary elections by the Constitutional Court in March, 2025, Glavchev commented that in his view the annulment was a demonstration of the cabinets ability to gather evidence of electoral fraud. He further blamed the political parties for being involved in cases of electoral fraud, and argued that preventing such fraud was outside the competencies of the caretaker government.

In December, 2025, Glavchev announced large-scale "personnel and structural reforms" within the Chamber of Audit, including the release of retirement-age employees and the introduction of stricter criteria for bonuses.

In January, 2026, after the resignation of the Zhelyazkov Government, Dimitar Glavchev indicated that he would be willing to once again be appointed as carateker prime minister if selected by President Iliana Yotova.

In August, 2026, a publication by the Bulgarian National Television stated that Dimitar Glavchev was leading three audits of public finances for the period between 2020-2026, which meant auditing his own caretaker governments. Glavchev has denied that these audits represent a conflict of interest, by promising to self-withdraw from their conduct and certification process.

== Footnotes ==
Political offices
Preceded by Tsetska Tsacheva	Speaker of the National Assembly; 2017	Succeeded by Tsveta Karayancheva
Preceded by Nikolai Denkov	Prime Minister of Bulgaria; 2024–2025	Succeeded by Rosen Zhelyazkov
Preceded by Stefan Dimitrov	Minister of Foreign Affairs of Bulgaria; 2024	Succeeded by Ivan Kondov
Government offices
Preceded by Tsvetan Tsvetkov	Chairman of the Chamber of Audit; 2023–present	Incumbent
