= Goritsa Grancharova =

Bulgarian politician (born 1966)

- Горица Грънчарова
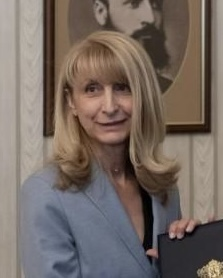
- Grancharova in 2024

Deputy Chairperson of the Chamber of Audit
- In office 9 April 2015 – 16 May 2025
- Chairperson: Tsvetan Tsvetkov; Dimitar Glavchev

Personal details
- Born: Goritsa Nikolova Grancharova; 9 April 1966 (age 60) Godlevo, PR Bulgaria
- Party: Independent
- Spouse: Mikhail Kozharev
- Education: D. A. Tsenov Academy of Economics
- Occupation: Politician; auditor

Goritsa Nikolova Grancharova-Kozhareva (Bulgarian: Горица Николова Грънчарова-Кожарева, born 9 April 1966) is a Bulgarian auditor who served as Deputy Chairperson of the Chamber of Audit. A political independent, she was selected to become Prime Minister of Bulgaria and form a caretaker government in August 2024. However, due to nominating the controversial figure of Kalin Stoyanov for Minister of Interior, her appointment to the position was blocked by President Rumen Radev.

== Early life, education and career ==
She was born on 9 April 1966, in the town of Razlog. She graduated from the D. A Tsenov Academy in Svishtov with a degree in "Audit and Control".

In her work outside the Chamber of Audit, she worked as an expert in the auditing sector, being employed by Bulgargaz, the National Revenues Agency and other Bulgarian banks.

== Career in the Chamber of Audit ==
Goritsa Grancharova-Kozharova was first nominated to serve in the Chamber of Audit in 2005, during the tenure of the Sakskoburggotski Government by the parliamentary group New Time. In this role, she led the section of the Audit Chamber responsible for auditing the Ministry of Defense, Ministry of Environment, the National Statistical Institute, the Bulgarian National Radio and Television, as well as other state institutions.

In 2011, she technically left the Chamber of Audit, instead being appointed to the Chamber of Audit's Consultation Council.

In 2014, during the Oresharski Government, Grancharova was once again appointed to the Chamber of Audit, with her candidacy being personally presented by BSP MP, Korneliya Ninova. In her renewed stint as a member of the Chamber of Audit, she was responsible for auditing the Presidential Administration, Cabinet, National Assembly, Bulgarian National Bank and institutions of the judicial system. She further led a work group meant to insure that the practices of the Chamber of Audit aligned international auditing standards. Her role as an auditor of the judicial system led to accusations of a conflict of interest, as her husband, Mikhail Kozharev, worked in the Supreme Judicial Council (SJC) at the time.

=== Leadership in the Chamber of Audit ===
In 2015, Grancharova-Kozhareva was nominated by the Patriotic Front "VMRO-NFSB" for the position of Head of the Chamber of Audit. Subsequently, however, her candidacy was withdrawn and Tsvetan Tsvetkov was elected unopposed. Grancharova-Kozhareva was selected as one of Tsvetkov's deputies, wherein she was responsible for supervising audits, overseeing cooperation with the Auditing Chambers of other NATO nations and chaired the Chamber of Audit's ethics committee.

Her term as deputy was supposed to last 7 years (between 2015 and 2022), however due to the political crisis which developed in Bulgaria, she continued to serve within the Chamber of Audit outside her nominal mandate.

On 16 May 2025, the National Assembly selected Margarita Nikolova and Silviya Kadreva as Deputy Heads of the Chamber of Audit, thus ending Goritsa Grancharova-Kozhareva's term within the Chamber of Audit.

==== Acting Head of the Chamber of Audit ====
On 20 January 2023, the National Assembly voted to remove the Head of the Chamber of Audit, Tsvetkov, after allegations that the institution did not properly investigate potentially illegally financing of We Continue the Change through the crypto-currency bank, Nexo. In the parliament's decision, it was mandated that Goritsa Grancharova-Kozhareva undertake the role of Acting Head of the Chamber of Audit. The parliament's decision was immediately challenged by President Rumen Radev, who claimed that the decision was unconstitutional.

Upon assuming the position of Acting Head, Grancharova-Kozhareva accused Tsvetkov of mismanagement of funds and of halting auditing processes. Tsvetkov, however, has denied these allegations.

During her tenure, some media outlets, particularly Dnevnik, claimed that the "administrative irregularities" report of the Audit Chamber was framed to defend the financial activities of the Prosecutors Office, in which her husband was employed.

On 7 July, the Constitutional Court ruled that Tsvetkov's removal had been unconstitutional, thus technically reinstating him to the position of Head of the Chamber of Audit. As a response, parliament voted to extend the procedure for the election of a new Head of the Chamber of Audit and codified Grancharova-Kozhareva's position as Acting Head.

On 11 July, Tsvetkov attempted to enter the Chamber of Audit building, however he was barred from doing so by Grancharova-Kozhareva who insisted that she remained the Acting Head of the institution.

The impasse was resolved on the 26th of July, when the National Assembly elected Dimitar Glavchev as the new head of the Chamber of Audit. On 31 July, Grancharova-Kozhareva officially welcomed Glavchev as the head of the institution and returned to her position as Deputy Head.

On 9 April 2024, Dimitar Glavchev assumed the position of Caretaker Prime Minister, leaving his position as head of the Chamber of Audit for the duration of his tenure. In his absence, Grancharova-Kozhareva was once again selected as the Acting Head of the Chamber of Audit.

In March, 2025, the civic NGO "Boets", alerted the Commission for Preventing Corruption and Illegal Enrichment that according to documents from the Chamber of Audit Grancharova-Kozhareva had received 102,000 Leva in bonuses during her time as acting head of the institution.

In August, 2025, it was confirmed that Grancharova-Kozhareva was sued by former head of the Chamber of Audit, for damages caused to him during her time as disputed head of the Chamber of Audit. It was subsequently confirmed that she was liable for 7,000 Leva in damages.

== Caretaker Prime Minister-Designate ==
=== Caretaker Government Formation & Rejection ===
As per the constitutional amendments, passed in December 2023, Grancharova, as Deputy Chairperson of the Chamber of Audit, was among the 9 officeholders within the civil service eligible to be selected by the President to serve as caretaker Prime Minister.

In August 2024, following the failure of the parties within the 50th National Assembly to elect a government, speculation mounted about whether Dimitar Glavchev, the incumbent caretaker Prime Minister was going to be re-appointed or replaced by another person of the available candidates. Grancharova, Glavchev's nominal deputy within the Chamber of Audit, increasingly emerged as one of the favourites to replace him.

On 9 August, President Rumen Radev officially announced that he had selected her for the position of caretaker Prime Minister, citing her political independence. Radev gave Grancharova 10 days to present a caretaker cabinet, so that he would be able to schedule the upcoming snap elections as early as 20 October.

In a statement to the press shortly after her designation, she confirmed that she intended to retain certain caretaker ministers from the Glavchev Government and would immediately begin interviews with prospective ministers.

On 19 August, Grancharova officially presented her caretaker cabinet. The cabinet, as anticipated, was mostly composed of Ministers from the incumbent Glavchev Cabinet, which Grancharova justified by citing the need for government continuity. President Radev, however, made clear that he would not sign the decree appointing the proposed caretaker cabinet due to the controversial nomination of Kalin Stoyanov for Minister of the Interior. Radev gave Grancharova an ultimatum to nominate another, less controversial person to the position in the next three hours. This offer was rejected by Grancharova who defended Kalin Stoyanov's record as Minister of Interior and claimed that Radev's proposed time frame was not adequate. She added that she had carried out her constitutional duties and had made every effort to form a government.

Shortly after her caretaker cabinet was not appointed, Grancharova visited the General Prosecutors Office in order to present evidence that she had been subjected to political pressure during the caretaker government formation process, with the aim of not appointing Kalin Stoyanov.

== Post-Chamber of Audit Career ==
On 6 June 2025, Goritsa Grancharova-Kozhareva was appointed as a member of the supervisory board of the Bulgarian Development Bank.

On 28 August, the party Yes, Bulgaria! accused the Chamber of Audit of violating the Law on Government Procurements by buying 22 unnecessary service cars; a purchase which took place during the tenure of Grancharova-Kozhareva. Subsequently, the parties co-leader, Ivaylo Mirchev, called for her resignation.

Grancharova-Kozhareva denied any wrong-doing, stating the purchase of the vehicles followed standard procedure, and promised to sue Ivaylo Mirchev for slander.
