= 44th National Assembly of Bulgaria =

2017 legislature in Bulgaria

44th National Assembly 44-то Народно събрание

History
- Founded: April 19, 2017
- Disbanded: March 25, 2021
- Preceded by: 43rd National Assembly
- Succeeded by: 45th National Assembly

Leadership
- Speaker: Tsveta Karayancheva (GERB)
- Deputy Speakers: Valeri Simeonov; Kristian Vigenin; Veselin Mareshki; Emil Hristov; Nigyar Dzhafer

Structure
- Seats: 240
- Political groups: Government (122) GERB (95) United Patriots (27): VMRO (11); NFSB (8); Attack (8); Confidence and supply (12) Volya (12) Opposition (106) BSP (80) DPS (26) Government (116) GERB (95) United Patriots (21): VMRO (11); NFSB (8); Attack (2); Confidence and supply (12) Volya (12) Opposition (112) BSP (70) DPS (25) Independent (17)

Meeting place
- National Assembly Building, Sofia

Website
- parliament.bg

The Forty-Fourth National Assembly (Bulgarian: Четиридесет и четвъртото народно събрание) was a convocation of the National Assembly of Bulgaria, formed according to the results of the parliamentary elections in Bulgaria, held on 26 March 2017.

== History ==
=== Government ===
The 44th National Assembly elected the Third Borisov Government after a coalition agreement was reached between the parliamentary groups of GERB and the United Patriots.
Due to internal disagreements, 7 politicians from the Attack party, including their leader Volen Siderov, were expelled from the United Patriots parliamentary group on 25 July 2019. This made the government a minority one but shortly after, the Volya party reassured its confidence in the government.

=== Speakership ===
The initial Speaker of the National Assembly was Dimitar Glavchev who resigned on November 17, 2017. Tsveta Karayancheva was chosen as his successor and remained in her role until the term of the 44th National Assembly ended.
