= Stefan Dimitrov (politician) =

Bulgarian politician

- Стефан Димитров
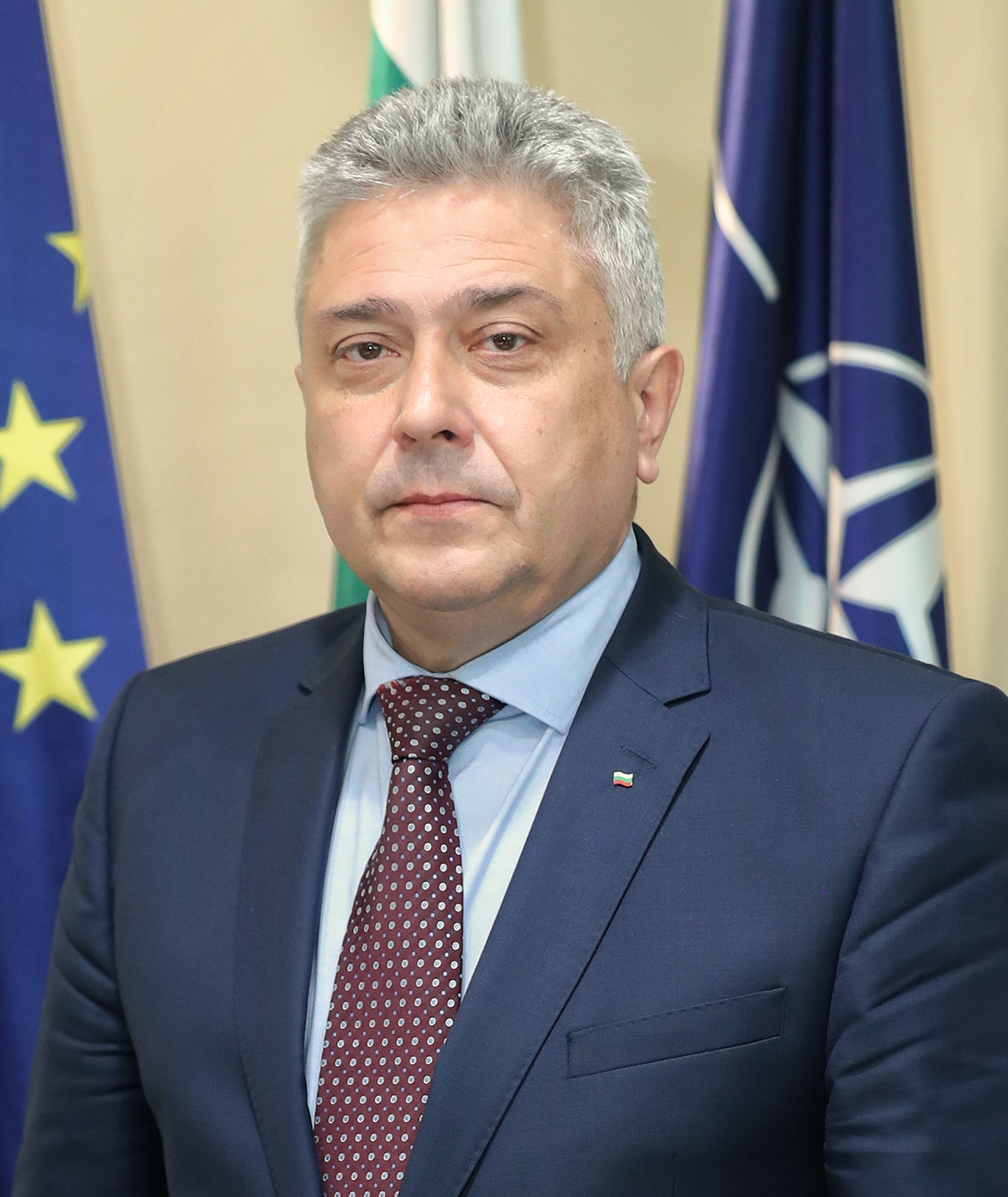
- Official portrait, 2024

Minister of Foreign Affairs
- In office 9 April 2024 – 22 April 2024
- Prime Minister: Dimitar Glavchev
- Preceded by: Mariya Gabriel
- Succeeded by: Dimitar Glavchev

Personal details
- Born: Stefan Dimitrov; 24 September 1966 (age 59) PR Bulgaria
- Party: Independent
- Children: 3
- Occupation: Politician; diplomat

Stefan Dimitrov (Bulgarian: Стефан Димитров; born 24 September 1966) is a Bulgarian politician who served as Minister of Foreign Affairs in April 2024. A political independent, he is also a diplomat who is the current Bulgarian Ambassador to Montenegro. From 2015 to 2019, he headed the Bulgarian consulate in Frankfurt.

Dimitrov faced backlash following his response to the April 2024 Iranian strikes in Israel. Reportedly, he didn't pick up his phone for hours, resulting in him missing calls from the Government and various ambassadors in Bulgaria. As a result, prominent political figures, such as GERB leader Boyko Borisov called for his resignation. Soon after, Prime Minister Dimitar Glavchev asked Dimitrov to resign and replaced him with himself as Foreign Minister.

Political offices
Preceded by Mariya Gabriel	Minister of Foreign Affairs of Bulgaria; 2024	Succeeded by Dimitar Glavchev
