= Dimitar Vachov =

Bulgarian politician

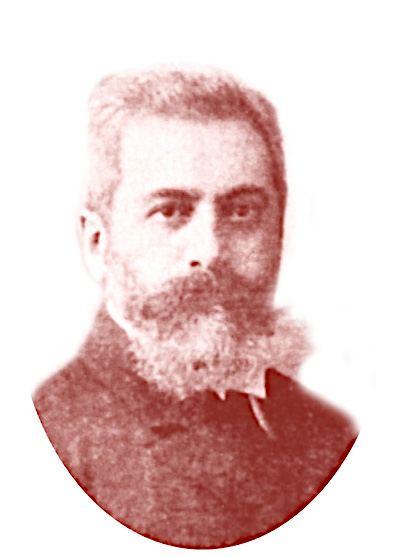

Chairman of the National Assembly of Bulgaria
- In office 19 December 1913 – 15 April 1919
- Preceded by: Ivan Evstratiev Geshov
- Succeeded by: Naycho Tsanov
- In office 16 May 1899 – 1 October 1899
- Preceded by: Georgi Yankulov
- Succeeded by: Zhecho Bakalov

Personal details
- Born: 30 January 1855 Lovech, Ottoman Empire
- Died: 4 December 1922 (aged 67)
- Party: Liberal Party
- Profession: Politician · educator

Dimitar Vachov (30 January 1855 – 4 December 1922) was a Bulgarian politician and educator. He twice served as Chairman of the National Assembly of Bulgaria and also was Minister of Education.

== Biography ==
Vachov was born on 30 January 1855 in Lovech, Ottoman Empire. He received his early education in Lovech before attending high school in Gabrovo. He later received further education in Písek, present-day Czech Republic. Vachov later participated in the Serbian–Turkish War as a volunteer in 1876. The following year, he began serving as a clerk for the city government in Sevlievo. Following the Russo-Turkish War, he studied in Vienna and later in Heidelberg, Germany, at the Faculty of Law, where he became a Doctor of Legal Science. After graduating, Vachov served as a lawyer and was employed by the Court of Appeal in Ruse. He moved to Sofia to continue his legal career in 1899.

Vachov was also involved in politics as a member of the Liberal Party. He won election to the National Assembly of Bulgaria in 1884. The following year, during the Serbo-Bulgarian War, he was active in organizing volunteer units, and in 1886, he was an editor of the newspaper Narodni Prava. Vachov served as vice-chairman of the Third Grand National Assembly from 1886 to 1887.

Vachov was elected Chairman of the National Assembly in May 1899 and remained in office until October that year. After his service as Chairman of the Assembly, he was appointed Minister of Public Education. In this role, he was active in filling staffs and reconstructing schools. Svetlana Petrova, a historian in Lovech, told the Bulgarian News Agency that Vachov, "put the ministry in order, ordering high and low officials to be at work regularly and on time ... He himself regularly received visitors and listened to them carefully, reviewed all correspondence and district reports. He seriously took up the reconstruction of schools, [and] a new law was prepared. He took steps to reassure and build trust in the teaching profession, the salaries of rural and urban teachers were equalized, it was decided to pay salaries during the summer vacation months, and teachers were given freedom to choose the appropriate textbooks". He also helped establish regulations for school inspections and the mandating of kindergarten in Bulgaria. Vachov served as education minister until November 1900. He returned as Chairman of the National Assembly in December 1913, serving in that role until April 1919. During his second stint as chairman, he saw Bulgaria's participation in World War I as part of the Central Powers. He died on 4 December 1922, at the age of 67.
