= 45th National Assembly of Bulgaria =

April 2021 legislature in Bulgaria

45th National Assembly 45-то Народно събрание

History
- Founded: April 15, 2021
- Disbanded: May 12, 2021
- Preceded by: 44th National Assembly
- Succeeded by: 46th National Assembly

Leadership
- Speaker: Iva Miteva (ITN)
- Deputy Speakers: Tsveta Karayancheva; Kristian Vigenin; Atanas Atanasov; Viktoria Vassileva; Tatyana Doncheva; Mukaddes Nalbant

Structure
- Seats: 240
- Political groups: GERB-SDS (75) ITN (51) BSP (43) DPS (30) DB (27) IBG-MV (14)

Meeting place
- National Assembly Building, Sofia

Website
- parliament.bg

The Forty-Fifth National Assembly (Bulgarian: Четиридесет и петото народно събрание) was a convocation of the National Assembly of Bulgaria, formed according to the results of the parliamentary elections in Bulgaria, held on 4 April 2021.

== Details ==
The assembly was dissolved on 12 May 2021 by President Rumen Radev, as he is obliged to do according to the Constitution in the event of three unsuccessful attempts to form a government. He also appointed the caretaker Yanev Government, which replaced the Third Borisov Government.
