= 42nd National Assembly of Bulgaria =

2013 legislature in Bulgaria

42nd National Assembly 42-ро Народно събрание

History
- Founded: May 21, 2013
- Disbanded: August 6, 2014
- Preceded by: 41st National Assembly
- Succeeded by: 43rd National Assembly

Leadership
- Speaker: Mihail Mikov (BSP)
- Deputy Speakers: Maya Manolova; Aliosman Imamov

Structure
- Seats: 240
- Political groups: Government (120) BSP (97) DPS (23) Confidence and supply (36) Attack (36) Opposition (84) GERB (84)

Meeting place
- National Assembly Building, Sofia

Website
- parliament.bg

The Forty-Second National Assembly (Bulgarian: Четиридесет и второто народно събрание) was a convocation of the National Assembly of Bulgaria, formed according to the results of the parliamentary elections in Bulgaria, held on May 12, 2013.

== History ==
The results of the election presented a tough configuration of the National Assembly without a clear majority. As the largest party, GERB was given the first chance to form a government but failed to gain support. The mandate was then given to the centre-left BSP, who reached a coalition agreement with the centrist DPS. The two parties were still 1 seat short of a majority and the path remained unclear. GERB’s strategy was to sabotage the quorum by not attending when the Assembly was to elect the government, hoping that the far-right Attack party would do the same. Their leader Volen Siderov, however, didn't like the idea and was present at the voting. Plamen Oresharski was sworn in as Prime Minister after receiving that indirect support from Siderov.
After mass protests for the most of its tenure, the Oresharski Government resigned. The parties refused to form another government, which resulted into President Rosen Plevneliev appointing a caretaker government and setting the date for new elections.
