= 43rd National Assembly of Bulgaria =

2014 legislature in Bulgaria

43rd National Assembly 43-то Народно събрание

History
- Founded: October 27, 2014
- Disbanded: January 26, 2017
- Preceded by: 42nd National Assembly
- Succeeded by: 44th National Assembly

Leadership
- Speaker: Tsetska Tsacheva (GERB)
- Deputy Speakers: Yanaki Stoilov; Krasimir Karakachanov; Yavor Notev; Dimitar Glavchev; Aliosman Imamov; Ivan Ivanov; Yavor Haytov; Kiril Tsochev

Structure
- Seats: 240
- Political groups: Government (107) GERB (84) RB (23) Confidence and supply (30) PF (19) ABV (11) Opposition (106) BSP (39) DPS (38) BBT (15) Attack (11)

Meeting place
- National Assembly Building, Sofia

Website
- parliament.bg

The Forty-Third National Assembly (Bulgarian: Четиридесет и третото народно събрание) was a convocation of the National Assembly of Bulgaria, formed according to the results of the parliamentary elections in Bulgaria, held on October 5, 2014.

== History ==
After tense negotiations for its formation, which were concluded with a centre-right coalition agreement between GERB and the Reformist Bloc, the 43rd National Assembly elected the Second Borisov Government. The right wing Patriotic Front and the centre-left ABV party both declared their support for the government in order to ensure the needed majority.
The ABV’s disagreements with its partners had reached their limit on 10 May 2016, when the party moved to the opposition side and Ivaylo Kalfin resigned as Deputy Prime Minister and Minister of Labour and Social Policy. Nonetheless, the government still controlled the majority in the National Assembly.
After the 2016 presidential election saw GERB’s candidate Tsetska Tsacheva lose to Rumen Radev, who was supported by the opposition, Boyko Borisov resigned as Prime Minister on 17 November 2016 and was replaced on 26 January 2017 by caretaker Ognyan Gerdzhikov.
