= D. A. Tsenov Academy of Economics =

Higher education institution in Bulgaria

Coordinates: 43°37′15″N 25°20′40″E

D. A. Tsenov Academy of Economics (Bulgarian: Стопанска академия „Д. А. Ценов") is a leading economics and business higher education institution in Svishtov, Bulgaria with more than 83 years of history, 145 000 alumni and a well-established reputation in education, science and project management. It was established in 1936 by the donation of the prominent and influential person and entrepreneur Dimitar Tsenov. His donation (5 million golden levs) is the second largest donation for the establishment of higher education institution in Bulgaria. His will was to establish a higher educational institution similar to Hoehere Handelsschule in Berlin and it should to be specialised in offering higher education in the field of finance, banking, insurance, trade, etc.

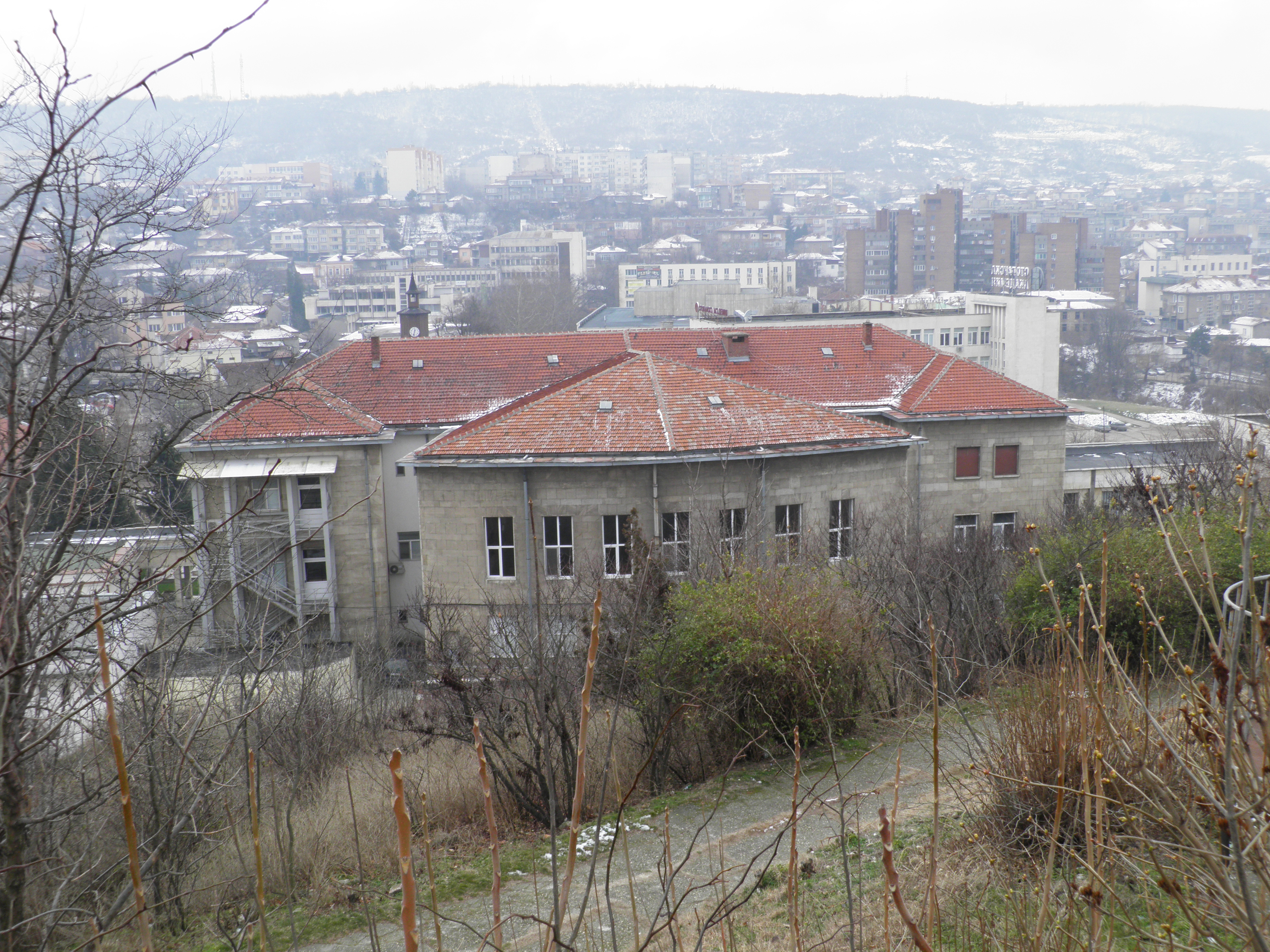
D. A. Tsenov Academy of Economics in Bulgaria

D. A. Tsenov Academy of Economics is composed of 4 faculties, 18 departments, a Scientific Research Institute, 17 academic centres and auxiliary units (incl. Centre for International Affairs, Centre for Educational Quality Assurance, Centre for Postgraduate and Continuing Education, Centre for Vocation Training, etc.). D. A. Tsenov Academy of Economics is accredited state higher education institution.

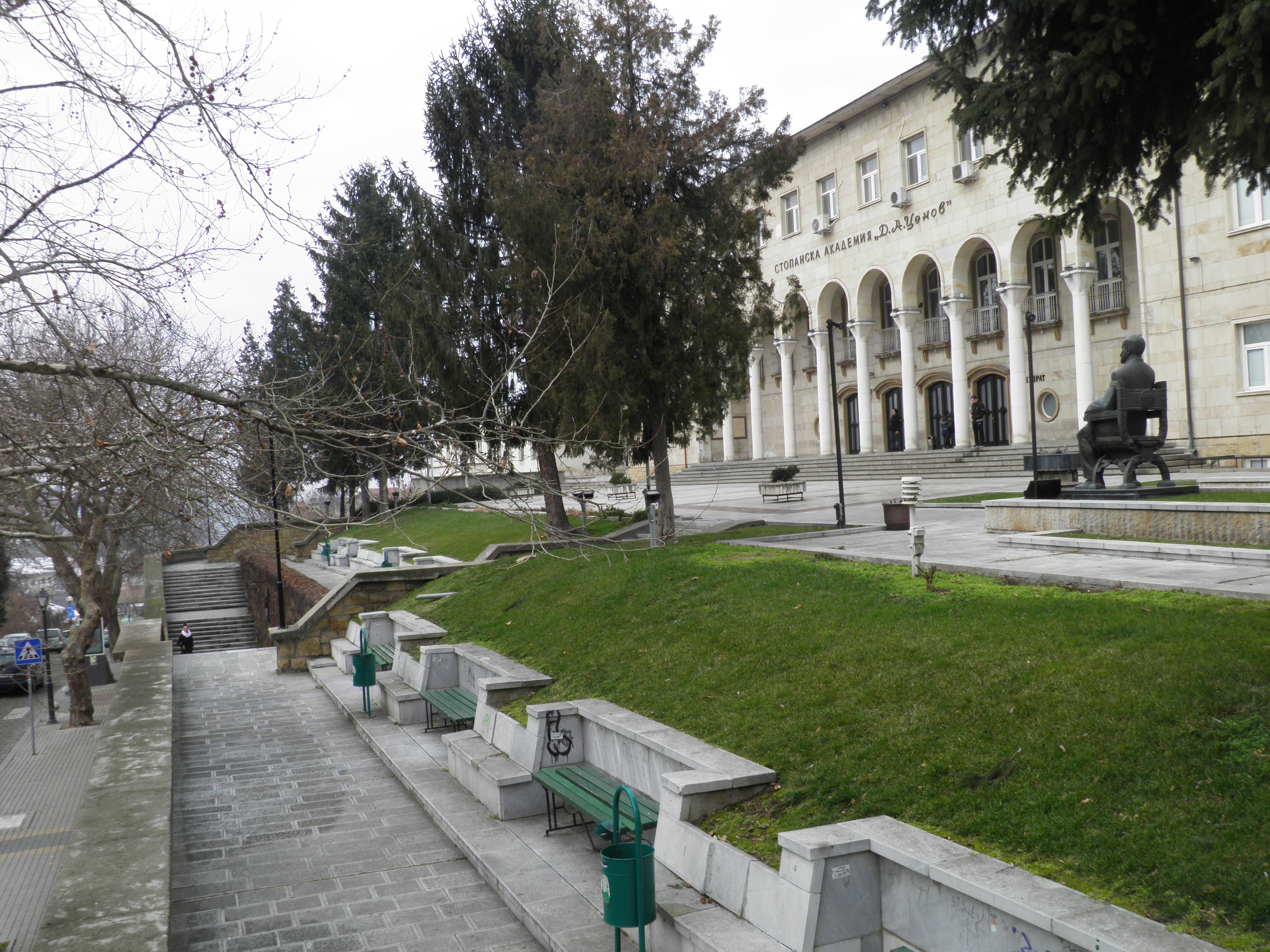

D. A. Tsenov Academy of Economics employs more than 180 professors, associate professors, assistant professors and lecturers, annually teaching more than 6,000 Bulgarian and foreign students in all three study cycle of higher education (bachelors, masters and doctoral degrees). It offers full-time, part-time and distance-learning study in 17 Bachelor's degree (BSc), 46 Master's degree (MSc), and 16 Doctoral degree programmes (PhD) in Economics, Business and Administration. The areas of specific expertise of the D. A. Tsenov Academy of Economics are finance, accounting, audit, risk management, quality management and assurance, marketing, social care, insurance, tourism, commerce, business informatics, entrepreneurship, international business, regional planning, public and business administration, business intelligence, e-learning, business analysis, forecasting, and planning.

D. A. Tsenov Academy of Economics actively participates as a partner of other European universities in various programmes of the EU, in projects of international research funds and inter-university educational networks and multinational higher education projects. D. A. Tsenov Academy of Economics has been approved by the Lloyd's Register of Quality Assurance in accordance with the ISO standards for quality management.

D. A. Tsenov Academy of Economics has a full Erasmus+ Charter, and it is entitled to use the statute of ‘Erasmus University’. International cooperation of the D. A. Tsenov Academy of Economics is undertaken using bilateral framework contracts and via inter-institutional agreements under Erasmus+ programme. D. A. Tsenov Academy of Economics has established more than 90 bilateral framework contracts and 130 inter-institutional agreements under Erasmus+ programme with HEIs from Programme and Partner countries. In November 2017 the academy was announced as the best Erasmus+ partner in Bulgaria and awarded with quality mark for successful implementation of Erasmus+ projects.

D. A. Tsenov Academy of Economics is a member of the European Universities Association (EUA), the Association of Economic Universities in South and Eastern Europe (ASECU), Black Sea and East Mediterranean Academic Network (BSEMAN), and the Confederation of Employers and Industrialists in Bulgaria (KRIB).
