= Tsveta Karayancheva =

Bulgarian engineer and politician

- Цвета Караянчева
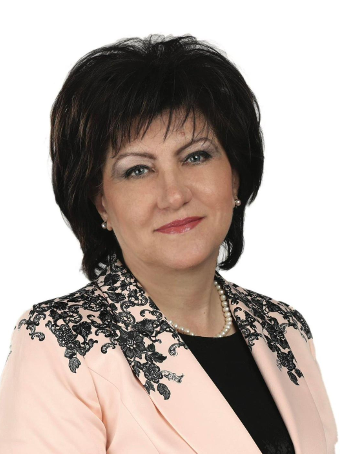
- Karayancheva in 2024

Speaker of the National Assembly
- In office 17 November 2017 – 25 March 2021
- Preceded by: Dimitar Glavchev
- Succeeded by: Iva Miteva

Member of the National Assembly
- Incumbent
- Assumed office 19 June 2024
- Constituency: 17th MMC - Plovdiv
- In office 14 July 2009 – 12 May 2021
- Constituency: 9th MMC - Kardzhali

Personal details
- Born: Tsveta Valcheva Karayancheva; 25 February 1968 (age 57) Bolyarovo, PR Bulgaria
- Political party: GERB
- Occupation: Politician; engineer

Tsveta Valcheva Karayancheva (born 25 February 1968) is a Bulgarian engineer and politician who served as Speaker of the National Assembly from 2017 to 2021. A member of the GERB party, she also served as Member of the National Assembly from 2009 to 2021, before returning in 2024.

== Early life, education and early career ==
Tsveta Valcheva Karayancheva was born on 25 February 1968 in Bolyarovo in Yambol Province. She attended a mechanical engineering college in Kardzhali before graduating from the Technical University, Sofia in engineering and from the New Bulgarian University in management.

Karayancheva worked at a plastic goods factory called Formplast in Kardzhali, moving up to become chief designer and factory manager. She also worked in industry in Kyrgyzstan.

== Political career ==
Karayancheva is a member of the GERB party, and became regional coordinator in Kardzhali in 2007. While working as an engineer she "transformed GERB-Kardzhali into a well-oiled machine that managed to liquidate the BSP as the second political force in the district and even depersonalize the MRF, which has always ruled there." She was elected as a member of the National Assembly representing the Kardzhail constituency at the 2009 parliamentary election. She was re-elected in 2013, 2014 and 2017. She was one of five Vice presidents of the Assembly from May to November 2017,

Karayancheva was elected Chair of the Assembly on 17 November 2017, with 138 votes for, 3 against, and 71 abstentions. She replaced Dimitar Glachev, who resigned to avoid "political upheaval" as Bulgaria took over the rotating Presidency of the Council of the European Union.

In November 2018, Karayancheva sponsored an amendment to the Penal Code to address domestic violence. In June 2019, she made an official visit to Moscow. On 9 March 2020, in response to the COVID-19 pandemic, Karayancheva banned foreign trips by all MPs. On 26 March, she proposed that the Assembly suspend regular sittings and convene only for urgent or emergency reasons, with questions to Cabinet ministers to be solely in written form.

In response to September 2020 protests against the government, Karayancheva said, "Of course we are legitimate. We won this power in 2017, when the elections were organized by the caretaker government of Rumen Radev." She said the protests had been funded by the mafia and that access to parliament for journalists would not be restored. Karayancheva had previously said the decision to only allow representatives of state institutions in parliament was part of the measures to prevent the spread of COVID-19. When a young protestor with a disability was denied access to the parliament's lobby bathroom, protestors left toilet seats on the stairs of the building demeaning Karayancheva's resignation. In response to a resolution of the European Parliament critical of the Bulgarian government, Karayancheva said, "The resolution is a political act that has neither legal nor legislative value."

In October 2020, the Assembly debated a request submitted by 96 members of the Bulgarian Socialist Party and Movement for Rights and Freedoms for her removal, arguing she had violated the rules of the legislative process and was ignorant of the Constitution. Deputy chair of the GERB parliamentary group, Krassimir Tsipov, rejected the request saying, "Ms. Karayancheva, you have not lost the trust of the majority that elected you." She was also supported by the United Patriots, with Slavcho Atanasov saying, "I claim that this politician has not stolen a penny from the state since she became a politician – unlike other leaders of other parties in the village of Krushovitsa." GERB Chair Daniela Daritkova said the opposition had no right to request the resignation after they had boycotted sittings of the Assembly in solidarity with protestors. After three hours of debate, she retained her position with 127 votes in favour and 97 against.

Karayancheva has extended an invitation to the European Commission, the Parliamentary Assembly of the Council of Europe, the Organization for Security and Cooperation in Europe, the European Commission for Democracy through Law and the Group of States against Corruption to send observers to the 2021 election after speculation about fairness. In January 2021, Karayancheva criticised President Rumen Radev for engaging in talk that undermined trust in the 2021 election process. She is a close confidante of Prime Minister Boyko Borisov and when news broke that he was being investigated for money laundering in Spain, she initially dismissed it as "fake news".

== Personal life ==
Karayancheva has been married to Iliya Karayanchev, whom she met as a student, for over thirty years. She is a grandmother of two. On 15 September 2019, the car Karayancheva was driving was hit by another driver who lost control near Hitrino. Karayancheva was taken to hospital with a broken collarbone and injured vertebrae. The driver was charged, but the case was dismissed after Karayancheva expressed a desire that they not be punished.
