= Chamber of Audit (Bulgaria) =

State auditor of Bulgaria

- Сметна палата
- Insignia of the Chamber of Audit

Agency overview
- Formed: 1880
- Jurisdiction: Bulgaria
- Headquarters: Ekzarh Yosif 37, Sofia
- Agency executive: Dimitar Glavchev, Chairman (since 28 July 2023)
- Parent agency: National Assembly
- Website: http://www.bulnao.government.bg/en

The Chamber of Audit (Bulgaria), also referred to as Bulgarian National Audit Office, is the state auditor of the Government of Bulgaria and directly subordinate of the National Assembly. It carries out external control of the financial resources and activities in the public sector. Dimitar Glavchev was elected as President of the Bulgarian National Audit Office on 28 July 2023, for a 7 year long term. If Glavchev - as expected - will be approved as the next caretaker Prime Minister of Bulgaria in 2024, he will take unpaid leave for the duration of his Prime Minister tenure, and designate a vice president of BNAO to exercise his powers while being on unpaid leave.

== Retrospection ==
The National Audit Office of Bulgaria is one of the most important and respected institutions of the restored Bulgarian statehood after the liberation of Bulgaria. During the 1879 Bulgarian Constituent Assembly election, the future national treasure was among the most discussed topics. After all, as early as the 19th century, Bulgaria managed to build one of the most modern such institutions of its time with a court and prosecutor's office regarding the control and disputes over public finances. This system survived throughout the first half of the twentieth century and was abolished by virtue of the so-called Dimitrov Constitution. During this historical period, Bulgaria was one of the most prosperous economic countries, and its currency was among the most valued.

From the Second World War to the so-called Revolutions of 1989, Bulgaria, following the example of the other countries of the Soviet bloc, did not have an independent supreme audit institution.

== Dispute over the model of the restored Bulgarian National Audit Office ==
The Constitution of Bulgaria restores the National Audit Office, but its specific model is a matter of fierce and speculative debates as a result of which the law on it until 1996 and the de facto institution was not restored until 1996, despite the requirements of the Constitution. As a result, a political crisis broke out in Bulgaria (1996 – 1997). In Bulgaria, unprecedented for a relatively developed and cultural country with traditions, a currency board was introduced which will remain for the next 20 years, and the population of Bulgaria will shrink for 35 years from 1985 to 2020 by 2 million or from 9 million to 7 million.
