= GERB =

Conservative political party in Bulgaria

Citizens for European Development of Bulgaria Граждани за европейско развитие на България
- Abbreviation: GERB
- Chairman: Boyko Borisov
- Deputy Chairmen: Tomislav Donchev; Daniel Mitov
- Founded: 3 December 2006
- Headquarters: Sofia
- Membership (2018): 14,000
- Ideology: Conservatism; Populism; Pro-Europeanism
- Political position: Centre-right
- National affiliation: GERB–SDS
- European affiliation: European People's Party
- European Parliament group: European People's Party Group
- International affiliation: International Democracy Union; Centrist Democrat International
- Colours: Blue
- National Assembly: 39 / 240
- European Parliament: 4 / 17
- Municipalities: 99 / 265

Party flag

Website
- gerb.bg

GERB (ГЕРБ), an acronym for Citizens for European Development of Bulgaria (Bulgarian: Граждани за европейско развитие на България, romanized: Grazhdani za evropeysko razvitie na Balgariya), is a conservative center-right populist political party which was the ruling party of Bulgaria during the periods between 2009–2013, 2014–2017, 2017–2021, 2025–2026 and was supporting the Denkov government between 2023–2024.

== History ==
GERB is headed by former prime minister of Bulgaria Boyko Borisov, the former mayor of Sofia, former member of the National Movement Simeon II and former personal guard of Todor Zhivkov in the 1990s. The establishment of the party followed the creation of a non-profit organization with the acronym (in Bulgarian) GERB – Citizens for European Development of Bulgaria, earlier the same year.

In early January 2007, and early February 2007, the party came second in public polls on party support with around 14%, trailing the Bulgarian Socialist Party which had around 25%. Its stated priorities are fighting crime and corruption, preserving family as the cornerstone of society and achieving energy independence.

GERB won the 2009 European Parliament election in Bulgaria with 24.36% of the vote. The party elected five MEPs and joined the European People's Party Group in the European Parliament (in the EPP section). On June 6, 2007, GERB applied formally to join as a member-party the European People's Party and joined EPP on February 7, 2008.

GERB won the 2009 parliamentary elections, held a month after the European ballot, winning 39.7% of the popular vote and 116 seats (out of 240). After the elections, a new government was formed, led by Borisov, primarily with GERB members and with 5 independent ministers around Deputy Prime Minister Simeon Djankov. The reformist wing was responsible for some of the most significant legislative victories, including a Constitutional reform to ban tax increases. GERB's candidates for the 2011 presidential election, Rosen Plevneliev and Margarita Popova (presidential nominee and running mate, respectively), won the elections on the second ballot with 52.6% of the popular vote.

On February 20, 2013, the government resigned after nationwide protests demanding it to step down. GERB remained the largest party after the 2013 parliamentary elections with 97 seats, receiving 30.5% of the popular vote. GERB failed to create governing coalition and went to opposition, when other parties supported the Oresharski government. However, due to the collapse of the coalition government in 2014 due to a new, even bigger wave of mass protests, GERB backed into power after the snap elections. GERB formed the second Borisov government with the Reformist Bloc and ABV with the support of the Patriotic Front. GERB's candidates for the 2016 presidential election, Tsetska Tsacheva and Plamen Manushev (presidential nominee and running mate, respectively), lost on the second round with 36.16%, while the opponent Rumen Radev won 59.37% of the votes and became President. After the election, Borisov resigned and the country headed for new elections. On the 2017 parliamentary election, GERB came first once again, winning 33.5% from the vote and 95 seats. He formed the Third Borisov government with the United Patriots. The government was also supported by Volya.

In 2020 GERB suffered a split, as a sizable number of members and local party organizations left alongside former second-in-command Tsvetan Tsvetanov to form the Republicans for Bulgaria party. The whole second half of 2020 saw mass protests against the GERB government, but nevertheless, Borisov did not resign.

In the April 2021 parliamentary election GERB was first with 26.18% of the vote. However, any attempts to form a coalition failed. In the July 2021 snap election, former Prime Minister Boyko Borisov's GERB-led coalition came second for first time since the creation of the party, with 23.51 percent of the vote. The next snap election was in November same year, Kiril Petkov's coalition emerged as surprise victors over the conservative GERB party, which dominated Bulgarian politics in the last decade. GERB has been in opposition since December 2021 until June 2022 – the fall of Petkov's government. After the 2022 election, government was not formed. After the 2023 election, GERB came first with a little margin over the PP-DB coalition, which came second. PP-DB and GERB formed the Denkov government, but GERB had very few ministers. In March 2024, a so called "rotation" of the government was planned, but the negotiations failed. GERB came first on the June 2024 election and October 2024 election. In January 2025, GERB formed the Zhelyazkov government with BSP, ITN and outside support from APS.

== List of chairmen ==
No.	Name	Portrait	Term of office	
1	Tsvetan Tsvetanov (1965–)		3 December 2006	10 January 2010
2	Boyko Borisov (1959–)		10 January 2010	Incumbent

== Parliamentary leaders ==
No.	Name	Portrait	National Assembly
1	Krasimir Velchev (1951–)		41st
2	Boyko Borisov (1959–)		42nd
3	Tsvetan Tsvetanov (1965–)		43rd
4	Daniela Daritkova (1966–)		44th
5	Desislava Atanasova (1978–)		45th
5	Desislava Atanasova (1978–)		46th
5	Desislava Atanasova (1978–)		47th
5	Desislava Atanasova (1978–)		48th
5	Desislava Atanasova (1978–)		49th
6	Boyko Borisov (1959–)		49th
	Boyko Borisov (1959–)		50th
	Boyko Borisov (1959–)		51st
	Boyko Borisov (1959–)		52nd

== Election results ==
=== National Assembly ===
Election	Votes	%	Seats	+/–	Status
2009	1,678,583	39.72 (#1)	116 / 240	New	Minority
2013	1,081,605	30.55 (#1)	97 / 240	▼19	Opposition
2014	1,072,491	32.67 (#1)	84 / 240	▼13	Coalition
2017	1,147,283	32.65 (#1)	95 / 240	▲11	Coalition
Apr 2021 (Note: In coalition with SDS.)	837,707	25.80 (#1)	73 / 240	▼22	Snap election
Jul 2021	642,165	23.21 (#2)	63 / 240	▼13	Snap election
Nov 2021	596,456	22.44 (#2)	59 / 240	▼3	Opposition
2022	634,627	24.48 (#1)	67 / 240	▲8	Snap election
2023	669,924	25.39 (#1)	69 / 240	▲2	Coalition
Jun 2024	530,658	23.99 (#1)	68 / 240	▼1	Snap election
Oct 2024	642,521	25.52 (#1)	66 / 240	▼2	Coalition
2026	433,755	13.18 (#2)	39 / 240	▼27	Opposition

=== Presidential ===
Election	Candidate	First round			Second round		
Election	Candidate	Votes	%	Rank	Votes	%	Result
2011	Rosen Plevneliev	1,349,380	40.1	1st	1,698,136	52.6	Won
2016	Tsetska Tsacheva	840,635	22.0	2nd	1,256,485	36.2	Lost
2021	Anastas Gerdzhikov	610,862	22.8	2nd	733,791	31.8	Lost

=== European Parliament ===
Election	List leader	Votes	%	Seats	+/–	EP Group
2007	Dushana Zdravkova	420,001	21.68 (#1)	5 / 18	New	EPP-ED
2009	Rumiana Jeleva	627,693	24.36 (#1)	5 / 18	0	EPP
2014	Tomislav Donchev	680,838	30.40 (#1)	6 / 17	▲1	EPP
2019	Mariya Gabriel	607,194	30.13 (#1)	6 / 17	0	EPP
2024	Rosen Zhelyazkov	474,059	23.55 (#1)	5 / 17	▼1	EPP

== Criticism ==
=== Corruption and Misuse of EU Funds ===
GERB has faced significant criticism regarding corruption and misuse of EU funds. Bulgaria ranked 67th on Transparency International's Corruption Perception Index in 2023, scoring 45 out of 100, penultimate in the European Union, having declined from 71st place in 2009 to a low of 78th in 2021.

=== 2020–2021 protests ===
GERB faced massive public protests in 2020–2021, with demonstrators demanding the resignation of party leader and Prime Minister Boyko Borisov over systemic corruption and poor governance. The protests lasted over 100 consecutive days, marking one of the longest sustained demonstrations in modern Bulgarian history.

The protests were triggered by multiple high-profile corruption scandals, including leaked recordings of senior officials discussing bribes and the resignation of the chief prosecutor amid allegations of protecting organized crime figures close to the government. Demonstrators occupied central Sofia nightly, blocking major intersections and demanding systemic judicial reform.

=== Contradictions Between EU Rhetoric and Domestic Policy ===
GERB has faced criticism regarding apparent contradictions between its formal pro-European alignment in the European Parliament and its record implementing EU integration domestically. Political scientists studying executive behavior in EU candidate and member states have identified what they characterize as "pragmatic populism" among GERB's leadership, whereby EU integration is deployed defensively as a rhetorical shield against domestic political pressure while institutional reforms required for effective integration have been deferred or resisted.

This pattern is evident in three major areas of EU integration: Schengen accession, eurozone adoption, and rule of law reforms. Regarding Schengen, Bulgaria met the technical requirements established by European authorities in 2010 but remained outside the area for 15 years. The European Union repeatedly cited rule of law and corruption concerns as the basis for this exclusion—concerns that observers argue GERB's governance did not adequately address. Bulgaria gained full Schengen membership on 1 January 2025 following accession on 31 March 2024 (partial, air and sea only), with the final decision driven primarily by initiatives from the EU's Hungarian presidency and European Commission, together with a shift in Austria's position after a Budapest agreement in November 2024 addressing migration concerns.

Regarding eurozone adoption, GERB designated euro entry as a priority upon taking office in 2009, with stated target dates of 2013. Finance Minister Vladislav Goranov subsequently announced multiple target dates for Bulgaria's eurozone entry in 2018, 2019, 2022, and 2023 each of which was postponed. In January 2025, with Bulgaria's inflation recorded at 0.1% above the Maastricht criterion, Finance Minister Temenuzhka Petkova announced that the government would not request an extraordinary convergence assessment from EU authorities, despite the narrow gap between Bulgaria's inflation and the required threshold. Opposition figures characterized this decision as an impediment to Bulgaria's EU integration objectives. One opposition MP stated: "If our own government does not play a double game, if it does not sabotage us, our chances for the eurozone next year are huge". The GERB-led government reversed this position on February 24, 2025, submitting extraordinary convergence reports to the European Commission and ECB following domestic political pressure.
