= Oresharski Government =

Government of Bulgaria (2013–2014)

- 92nd Cabinet of Bulgaria
- Date formed: 29 May 2013
- Date dissolved: 6 August 2014

People and organisations
- Head of state: Rosen Plevneliev
- Head of government: Plamen Oresharski
- Deputy head of government: See list: Zinaida Zlatanova (Justice) Daniela Bobeva (Economy) Tsvetlin Yovchev (Interior)
- Member parties: Bulgarian Socialist Party; Movement for Rights and Freedoms
- Status in legislature: Coalition

History
- Incoming formation: Government formation
- Outgoing formation: Resignation
- Election: 2013
- Legislature term: 42nd National Assembly
- Predecessor: Raykov Government (Provisional)
- Successor: Bliznashki Government (Provisional)

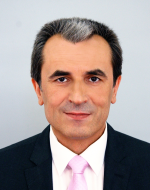
Plamen Oresharski

The Oresharski Government was the ninety-second cabinet of Bulgaria which took office on 29 May 2013. The government, led by Prime Minister Plamen Oresharski, is one of technocrats created following the 2013 election. The cabinet was dissolved on 6 August 2014 to make way for a caretaker government that would lead Bulgaria through early elections in October of the same year.

== Formation ==
After President Rosen Plevneliev invited the Bulgarian Socialist Party to form a government, the BSP nominated Plamen Oresharski to head the government and was joined by the Movement for Rights and Freedoms. The Council of Ministers was approved by the 120 members of the BSP and the Movement for Rights and Freedoms, while GERB's 97 MPs voted against the government and Ataka's 23 MPs were absent from the session. Outside support to the Oresharski government is also given by nationalist party Ataka.

Only two weeks after its initial formation the government came under criticism and had to deal with country-wide protests by the citizens, with those in Sofia reaching up to 11 000 participants. The reasons for these protests were largely the controversial appointment of media mogul Delyan Peevski as a chief of the National Security State Agency. The protests have ended with the government's resignation.

== Cabinet ==
=== Original Composition ===
Ministry	Minister	Party
Prime Minister	Plamen Oresharski	Independent (Note: Endorsed by the Bulgarian Socialist Party)
Deputy Prime Minister – Minister of Justice (also in charge of EU funds absorption)	Zinaida Zlatanova	Independent
Deputy Prime Minister – Minister of Economy	Daniela Bobeva	Independent
Deputy Prime Minister – Minister of Interior	Tsvetlin Yovchev	Independent
Minister of Finance	Petar Chobanov	Independent
Minister of Foreign Affairs	Kristian Vigenin	BSP
Ministry of Transport, Information Technology and Communications	Danail Papazov	Independent
Ministry of Education, Youth and Science	Aneliya Klisarova	BSP
Minister of Health	Tanya Andreeva	Independent
Minister of Youth and Sports	Mariana Georgieva	DPS
Minister of Defence	Angel Naydenov	BSP
Minister of Culture	Petar Stoyanovich	Independent
Minister of Environment	Iskra Mihaylova	DPS
Minister of Economy, Energy and Tourism	Dragomir Stoynev	BSP
Minister of Labor and Social Policy	Hassan Ademov	DPS
Minister of Regional Development	Desislava Terzieva	Independent
Minister of Agriculture and Food	Dimitar Grekov	Independent
Minister of Investment Projects	Ivan Danov	Independent

=== Changes in June 2013 ===
On 27 June, Tsvetlin Yovchev (BSP) is appointed as deputy Prime Minister, and Daniela Bobeva (BSP) is appointed deputy Prime Minister and minister of economic development.

=== Changes in June 2014 ===
Following her recent election to the European Parliament, Iskra Mihaylova steps down as minister of the environment and is succeeded by Stanislav Anastasov (DPS).

== Votes of no-confidence ==
The government survived three vote of no-confidences as of early 2014. The third vote was tabled by the opposition due to alleged mismanaging of refugees from the Syrian civil war and a failure to curb crime. Out of 217 voting MPs, the governing coalition voted to support the administration with 116 votes.

In all, the government survived 5 votes of no-confidence before voluntarily resigning.

== Resignation ==
Following an agreement from the three largest parties (GERB, BSP and DPS) to hold early parliamentary elections for 5 October 2014, the cabinet was to resign by the end of July.

On Wednesday 23 July, Oresharski's government submitted its resignation. The next day parliament voted 180–8 (8 abstained and 44 were absent) to accept the government's resignation. Following the vote, President Plevneliev offered the mandate to GERB to try and form government, but it was refused. The next day the BSP returned the mandate as well. On 30 July, the DPS refused the mandate as well. Finally, on 6 August, a caretaker government led by Georgi Bliznashki was sworn into office and the Oresharski government was officially dissolved.

== See also ==
- 2013–2014 Bulgarian protests against the Oresharski cabinet
- History of Bulgaria since 1989
