= 2014 Bulgarian parliamentary election =

- 5 October 2014
- All 240 seats in the 43rd National Assembly; 121 seats needed for a majority
- Turnout: 51.05% (▼1.42pp)
Party	Leader	Vote %	Seats	+/–
GERB	Boyko Borisov	32.67	84	−13
Left Bulgaria	Mihail Mikov	15.40	39	−45
DPS	Lyutvi Mestan	14.84	38	+2
RB	Radan Kanev	8.89	23	+23
PF	Krasimir Karakachanov	7.28	19	+19
BBT	Nikolay Barekov	5.69	15	New
Ataka	Volen Siderov	4.52	11	−12
ABV	Georgi Parvanov	4.15	11	New
This lists parties that won seats. See the complete results below.

Prime Minister before	Prime Minister after
Georgi Bliznashki; Independent (Bliznashki Government)	Boyko Borisov; GERB (Second Borisov Government)

Parliamentary elections were held in Bulgaria on 5 October 2014 to elect the 43rd National Assembly. GERB remained the largest party, winning 84 of the 240 seats with around a third of the vote. A total of eight parties won seats, the first time since the beginning of democratic elections in 1990 that more than seven parties entered parliament. Boyko Borisov then became prime minister as head of a coalition with the Reformist Bloc and with outside support from the Patriotic Front and the Alternative for Bulgarian Revival.

== Background ==
After the 2013 election, the seat distribution was such that the new coalition government, composed of the Bulgarian Socialist Party (BSP) and the Movement for Rights and Freedoms (DPS) and led by Plamen Oresharski, had only half the seats in Parliament, and thus prospects of holding early elections were significant. Also, the Oresharski cabinet was confronted by a series of protests starting on 14 June 2013, in response to the election of Delyan Peevski as head of the Bulgarian state security agency DANS (State Agency for National Security).

Following the setback suffered by the BSP in the European Parliament election, having picked up 18.94% of the popular vote (down from 26.6% in 2013), opposition parties called for early parliamentary elections. The leader of the DPS expressed his desire to have the government resign so that early elections can be scheduled for the end of 2014 or the middle of 2015.

On 10 June 2014 the leader of the Bulgarian Socialist Party, Sergei Stanishev, demanded the resignation of the government: "We cannot have the responsibility for the existence and actions of this government solely by ourselves." Following an agreement from the three largest parties (GERB, BSP and DPS) to hold early parliamentary elections for 5 October 2014, the cabinet was to resign by the end of July.

On Wednesday July 23, Oresharski's government submitted its resignation. The next day parliament voted 180–8 (8 abstained and 44 were absent) to accept the government's resignation. After each party refused to try to form a new government, on 6 August a caretaker government led by Georgi Bliznashki was sworn into office and the 42nd National Assembly was dissolved with an election date set for 5 October.

== Campaign ==
Twenty-two parties and seven coalitions registered to run on election day before the deadline. Two parties were denied registration.

The election campaign started on 5 September.

== Opinion polls ==
=== Pre election campaign ===
Pre election campaign polls
Source	Date	GERB	BSP	DPS	Attack	RB	BBT	PF	ABV	Others	Total
Sova Haris	21 July 2013	16.9%	19.3%	7.8%	2.3%	3.9%	–	2.3%	–	1.8%	54.3%
Alpha Research	27 August 2013	15.6%	18.4%	5.8%	1.5%	7.6%	–	3.1%	–	21.6%	73.6%
Alpha Research	25 September 2013	15.6%	17.9%	5.8%	1.5%	7.6%	–	3.1%	–	21.6%	73.6%
Institute for Modern Politics	28 September 2013	16.6%	18.5%	5.8%	1.4%	5.6%	–	1.9%	–	16.5%	66.3%
AFIS	29 September 2013	19.9%	21.2%	6.5%	2.5%	3.3%		2.8%	–	7.8%	64.0%
Sova Haris	24 October 2013	19.5%	21.7%	5.3%	2.0%	3.8%	2.4%	1.9%	–	0.7%	57.3%
Alpha Research	31 October 2013	16.5%	16.9%	6.1%	3.0%	6.4%	–	2.6%	–	8.2%	59.7%
Institute for Modern Politics	10 November 2013	26.2%	26.2%	8.1%	1.3%	8.2%	6.1%	1.9%	–	–	78.0%
Mediana	18 November 2013	16.9%	22.8%	7.6%	2.8%	8.6%	4.3%	2.9%	–	2.9%	68.8%
Gallup	19 November 2013	18.1%	21.4%	5.9%	2.4%	6.7%	–	–	–	–	54.5%
Sova Haris	4 December 2013	16.3%	21.3%	5.5%	2.7%	4.3%	3.0%	1.3%	–	1.2%	55.6%
Alpha Research	8 December 2013	15.8%	16.5%	6.1%	2.7%	6.9%	–	3.5%	–	9.7%	61.2%
AFIS	12 December 2013	18%	22%	5%	2%	5%	3%	1%	–	10%	66%
Focus	13 December 2013	23.5%	22.3%	5.5%	2.7%	5.8%	3%	3%	–	–	65.8%
Institute for Modern Politics	17 December 2013	21.0%	21.2%	4.8%	1.9%	4.8%	5.0%	1.9%	–	–	60.6%
Gallup	18 December 2013	18.0%	22.8%	6.1%	1.8%	4.8%	2.1%	1.6%	–	3.5%	60.7%
Sova Haris	15 January 2014	18.4%	19.5%	6.8%	2.3%	4.2%	3.0%	1.5%	–	0.8%	56.5%
Gallup	16 January 2014	18.1%	21.6%	5.8%	1.5%	4.8%	2.5%	2.1%	–	3.5%	59.9%
Modern Institute for Politics	31 January 2014	19.8%	20.5%	4.3%	1.6%	4.5%	5.6%	1.5%	1.0%	4.0%	62.8%
Gallup	13 March 2014	19.9%	19.0%	6.0%	2.5%	3.6%	4.9%	1.8%	1.8%	–	59.6%
Sova Haris	25 March 2014	21.7%	22.3%	7.6%	2.3%	3.1%	7.0%	0.9%	2.6%	0.7%	68.2%
Sova Haris	28 April 2014	17.2%	19.8%	6.6%	2.2%	3.8%	6.0%	1.8%	2.4%	0.4%	60.2%
Center for Analysis and Marketing	30 April 2014	19.7%	16.0%	8.2%	–	4.8%	4.6%	–	–	–	53.3%
Focus	23 May 2014	24%	26%	12.5%	4.5%	5.5%	9.5%	4.5%	–	–	86.5%
Sova Haris	21 July 2014	23%	15.2%	8%	1.3%	4%	–	1%	2.7%	–	55.2%
Modern Institute for Politics	25 July 2014	27.2%	13.5%	7.3%	2.4%	4.5%	6.0%	2.4%	4.0%	4.9%	72.2%
Gallup	14 August 2014	23.4%	15.9%	7.8%	1.7%	4.2%	4.7%	3.1%	2.4%	2.9	66.1%
AFIS	24 August 2014	31.3%	22.7%	10.1%	3.2%	6.3%	4.5%	4.1%	4.9%	12.9%	100%
Sova Haris	30 August 2014	43.2%	31.4%	11%	–	7.1%	7.3%	–	–	–	100%
Mediana	1 September 2014	26.8%	17.5%	9.2%	3.7%	4.4%	4.7%	4.3%	3.3%	–	73.9%
Source	Date	GERB	BSP	DPS	Attack	RB	BBT	PF	ABV	Others	Total

=== Election campaign ===
Source	Date	GERB	BSP	DPS	Attack	RB	BBT	PF	ABV	Others	Total
Gallup	18 September 2014	35.9%	18.3%	14.2%	3.4%	5.6%	5.8%	4.9%	3.6%	8.3%	100.0%
Alpha Research	1 October 2014	34.1%	19.1%	15.4%	-	6%	6%	4.2%	-	-	84.8%

== Results ==
Results of the election, showing vote strength by electoral district.

Party	Votes	%	+/–	Seats	+/–
GERB	1,072,491	32.67	+2.1	84	–13
BSP - Left Bulgaria	505,527	15.40	–11.2	39	–45
Movement for Rights and Freedoms	487,134	14.84	+3.5	38	+2
Reformist Bloc	291,806	8.89	+1.1	23	+23
Patriotic Front	239,101	7.28	+1.7	19	+19
Bulgaria Without Censorship	186,938	5.69	New	15	New
Attack	148,262	4.52	–2.8	11	–12
Alternative for Bulgarian Revival	136,223	4.15	New	11	New
Movement 21	39,221	1.19	New	0	New
People's Voice	37,335	1.14	–0.2	0	0
The Greens	19,990	0.61	–0.1	0	0
Republic BG	18,901	0.58	New	0	New
New Bulgaria	12,628	0.38	New	0	New
New Alternative	11,583	0.35	–0.2	0	0
United Bulgaria	10,831	0.33	New	0	New
Bulgarian Social Democracy	9,431	0.29	New	0	New
National Movement for Stability and Progress	7,917	0.24	New	0	New
Party of the Greens	7,456	0.23	New	0	New
The Rights	7,234	0.22	New	0	New
Left and the Green Party	7,010	0.21	–0.0	0	0
Bulgarian National Union – New Democracy	5,559	0.17	New	0	New
New Force	5,553	0.17	New	0	New
Social Democratic Party	5,398	0.16	+0.1	0	0
Community for New Bulgaria	4,615	0.14	New	0	New
New Time	3,836	0.12	New	0	New
Independents	1,185	0.04	New	0	New
Total	3,283,165	100.00	–	240	0
Valid votes	3,283,165	93.77			
Invalid/blank votes	218,125	6.23			
Total votes	3,501,290	100.00			
Registered voters/turnout	6,858,304	51.05			
Source: CIK

=== Voter demographics ===
Gallup exit polling suggested the following demographic breakdown. The parties which received below 4% of the vote are included in 'Others':

Voter demographics
Social group	% GERB	% BSP	% DPS	% RB	% PF	% BBT	% Ataka	% ABV	% Others	% Lead
Exit Poll Result	34	16	12	9.5	6	6	5	5	6.5	18
Final Result	32.7	15.4	14.8	8.9	7.3	5.7	4.5	4.2	6.5	17.3
Gender
Men	34	14	13	9	7	6	7	4	6	18
Women	35	17	11	10	6	6	3	5	7	18
Age
18–30	35	8	16	12	5	7	4	3	10	19
30-60	37	13	12	12	6	6	5	5	4	24
60+	26	35	8	6	7	3	6	5	4	9
Highest Level of Education
Lower Education	19	21	35	3	4	6	6	1	5	14
Secondary Education	36	16	12	7	7	7	5	4	6	20
Higher Education	37	15	2	15	7	4	4	6	10	22
Ethnic Group
Bulgarian	38	17	1	11	8	6	6	5	8	21
Turkic	6	2	84	3	0	1	0	1	3	78
Roma	20	22	36	3	1	8	4	1	5	14
Location
Towns and Villages	24	18	31	4	3	6	6	4	4	7
Smaller Cities	32	19	7	8	7	8	6	4	9	13
Larger Cities	41	13	4	10	8	6	5	5	8	28
Sofia	36	15	1	21	6	2	4	6	9	15

== Reactions ==
Following his party's election victory, Borisov stated that his party would try to form the next government and that he "want[s] to govern, in person".

== Government formation ==
The newly elected Assembly met for the first time on 27 October.

After being tasked by President Rosen Plevneliev to form a government, Borisov's GERB allied with the Reformist Bloc to form a government and also had the outside support of the Patriotic Front and the Alternative for Bulgarian Revival. The cabinet of twenty ministers was approved by a majority of 136-97 (with one abstention). Borisov was then chosen as prime minister by an even larger vote of 149-85.
