= Parties in the European Council during 2014 =

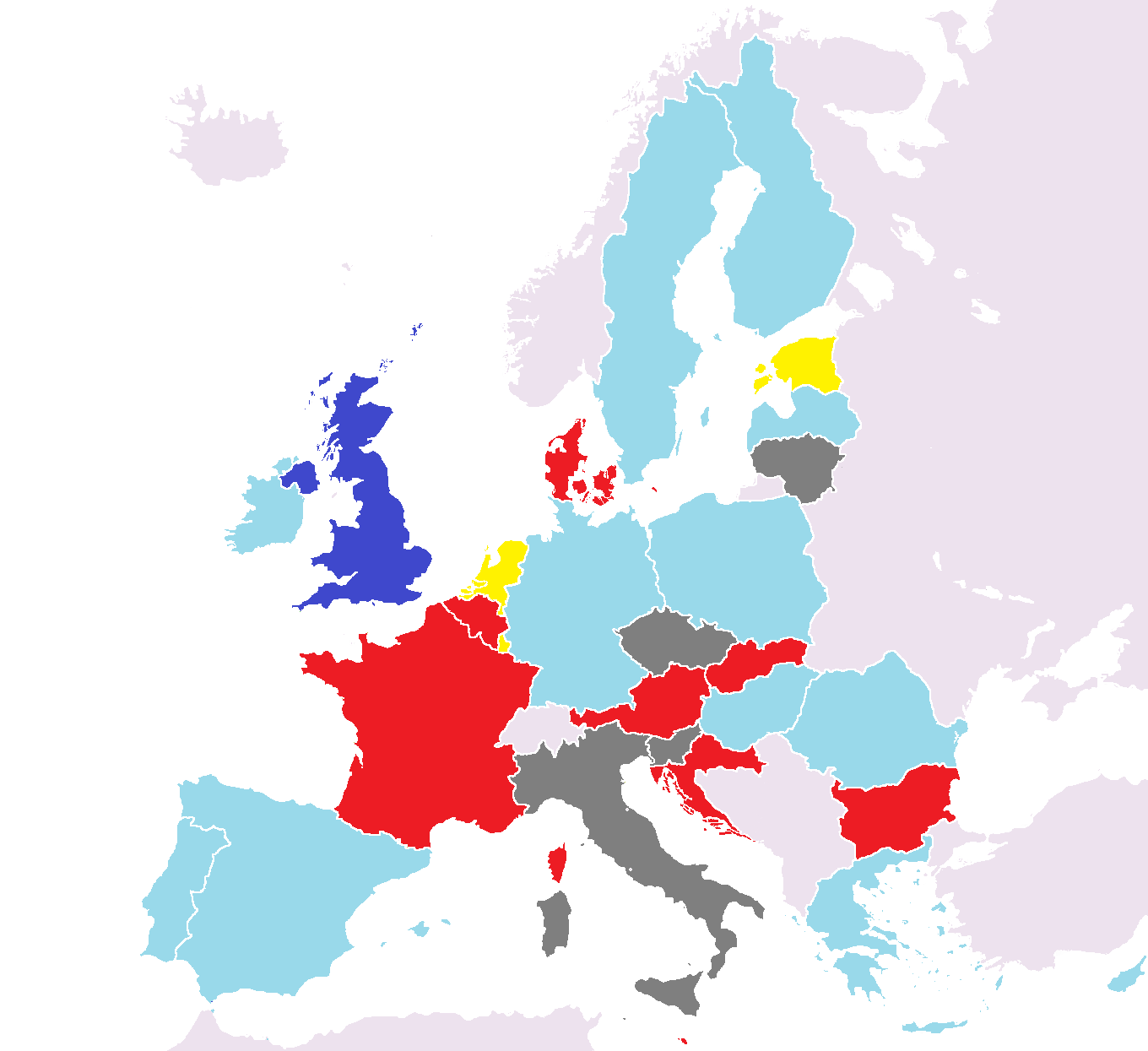
The member-states of the European Union by the European party affiliations of their leaders, as of 1 January 2014.

This article describes the party affiliations of leaders of each member-state represented in the European Council during the year 2014. The list below gives the political party that each head of government, or head of state, belongs to at the national level, as well as the European political alliance to which that national party belongs. The states are listed from most to least populous. More populous states have greater influence in the council, in accordance with the system of Qualified Majority Voting.

== Summary ==
| Party | 1 January 2014 | | 29 January 2014 | | 1 March 2014 | | 6 August 2014 | | 3 October 2014 | | 11 October 2014 | | 1 November 2014 | | 7 November 2014 | | 21 November 2014 |
| Party | # | QMV | # | QMV | # | QMV | # | QMV | # | QMV | # | QMV | # | Pop.% | # | Pop.% | # | Pop.% |
|---|---|---|---|---|---|---|---|---|---|---|---|---|---|---|---|---|---|---|
| European People's Party | 12 | 165 | 12 | 165 | 12 | 165 | 12 | 165 | 11 | 155 | 11 | 155 | 11 | 45.53% | 12 | 46.97% | 12 | 46.97% |
| Party of European Socialists | 8 | 85 | 9 | 97 | 10 | 126 | 9 | 116 | 10 | 126 | 9 | 114 | 9 | 34.33% | 9 | 34.33% | 9 | 34.33% |
| Independent | 4 | 52 | 3 | 40 | 2 | 11 | 3 | 21 | 3 | 21 | 3 | 21 | 3 | 2.44% | 2 | 1.00% | 1 | 0.59% |
| Alliance of European Conservatives and Reformists | 1 | 29 | 1 | 29 | 1 | 29 | 1 | 29 | 1 | 29 | 1 | 29 | 1 | 12.61% | 1 | 12.61% | 1 | 12.61% |
| Alliance of Liberals and Democrats for Europe Party | 3 | 21 | 3 | 21 | 3 | 21 | 3 | 21 | 3 | 21 | 4 | 33 | 4 | 5.89% | 4 | 5.89% | 5 | 6.30% |

== List of leaders (1 January 2014) ==
| Member-state | Votes | Leader | National party | European party |
|---|---|---|---|---|
| Germany | 29 | Angela Merkel | CDU | EPP |
| France | 29 | François Hollande | PS | PES |
| United Kingdom | 29 | David Cameron | Con | AECR |
| Italy | 29 | Enrico Letta | PD | Independent |
| Spain | 27 | Mariano Rajoy | PP | EPP |
| Poland | 27 | Donald Tusk | PO | EPP |
| Romania | 14 | Traian Băsescu | Independent | EPP |
| Netherlands | 13 | Mark Rutte | VVD | ALDE Party |
| Greece | 12 | Antonis Samaras | ND | EPP |
| Belgium | 12 | Elio Di Rupo | PS | PES |
| Portugal | 12 | Pedro Passos Coelho | PPD/PSD | EPP |
| Czech Republic | 12 | Jiří Rusnok | Independent |
| Hungary | 12 | Viktor Orbán | Fidesz | EPP |
| Sweden | 10 | Fredrik Reinfeldt | M | EPP |
| Austria | 10 | Werner Faymann | SPÖ | PES |
| Bulgaria | 10 | Plamen Oresharski | Independent | PES (Note: PES General Secretary Achim Post stated that; “the PES sends the warmest congratulations to the BSP on the formation of the new Government in Bulgaria. Plamen Oresharski becomes the tenth PES head of State or Government in the European Council" although not member of BSP. See the PES press release: "New Bulgarian Government will be one with an irreproachable sense of integrity, responsibility and urgency, says Sergei Stanishev".) |
| Denmark | 7 | Helle Thorning-Schmidt | A | PES |
| Slovakia | 7 | Robert Fico | SMER-SD | PES |
| Finland | 7 | Jyrki Katainen | Kok. | EPP |
| Ireland | 7 | Enda Kenny | FG | EPP |
| Croatia | 7 | Zoran Milanović | SDP | PES |
| Lithuania | 7 | Dalia Grybauskaitė | Independent |
| Slovenia | 4 | Alenka Bratušek | PS | Independent |
| Latvia | 4 | Valdis Dombrovskis | V | EPP |
| Estonia | 4 | Andrus Ansip | RE | ALDE Party |
| Cyprus | 4 | Nicos Anastasiades | DISY | EPP |
| Luxembourg | 4 | Xavier Bettel | DP | ALDE Party |
| Malta | 3 | Joseph Muscat | PL | PES |

Supported by PD-L

== Changes ==
=== Affiliation ===
| Date | Member-state | Leader | National party | European party |
| 29 January | Czech Republic | Bohuslav Sobotka | ČSSD | PES |
| 1 March | Italy | Matteo Renzi | PD | PES |
| 6 August | Bulgaria | Georgi Bliznashki | Independent |
| 3 October | Sweden | Stefan Löfven | S | PES |
| 11 October | Belgium | Charles Michel | MR | ALDE Party |
| 7 November | Bulgaria | Boyko Borisov | GERB | EPP |
| 21 November | Slovenia | Miro Cerar | SMC | ALDE Party |

– Democratic Party, which held office under Matteo Renzi, became an PES member. – Party of Miro Cerar, which held office under Miro Cerar, became an ALDE Party member.

=== Office-holder only ===
| Date | Member-state | Leader | National party | European party |
|---|---|---|---|---|
| 22 January | Latvia | Laimdota Straujuma | V | EPP |
| 22 February | Italy | Matteo Renzi | PD | Independent |
| 26 March | Estonia | Taavi Rõivas | RE | ALDE Party |
| 24 June | Finland | Alexander Stubb | Kok. | EPP |
| 18 September | Slovenia | Miro Cerar | SMC | Independent |
| 22 September | Poland | Ewa Kopacz | PO | EPP |
| 22 September | Romania | Klaus Iohannis | Independent | EPP |

Supported by PNL

== See also ==
- Presidency of the Council of the European Union
