= Tsvetlin Yovchev =

Bulgarian politician

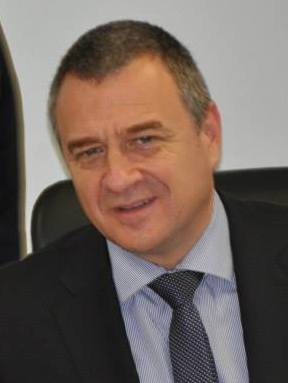

Head of National Security State Agency
- In office 10 August 2009 – 25 February 2011
- Prime Minister: Boyko Borisov

Minister of Interior
- In office 29 May 2013 – 6 August 2014
- Prime Minister: Plamen Oresharski

Personal details
- Born: 7 May 1964 (age 61) Pleven, Bulgaria

Tsvetlin Yovchev (Bulgarian: Цветлин Йовчев) is a Bulgarian politician, who served in the security sector as a head of the DANS National Security State Agency in the Borisov Government and as a Minister of Interior in the Oresharski Government. He was also chief of cabinet of former president Rosen Plevneliev.

Yovchev holds a Master's in economics from Sofia University. He is married and has one child. Yovchev speaks Russian and English in addition to his native Bulgarian.
