= Stanislav Anastasov =

Bulgarian politician (born 1983)

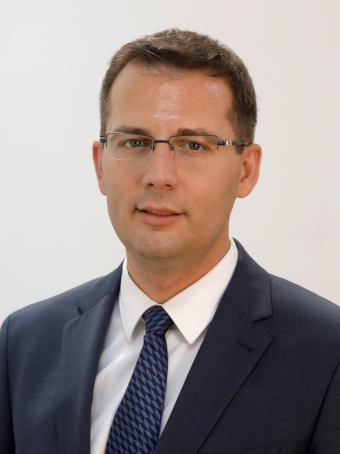
- Anastasov in 2021

Member of the National Assembly
- Incumbent
- Assumed office 21 July 2021
- Constituency: Vidin (2021); Lovech (2021–2023); Vidin (2023–2024); Haskovo (2024); Plovdiv City (2024–present)
- In office 27 October 2014 – 26 January 2017
- Constituency: Vidin

Minister of Environment and Water
- In office 19 June 2014 – 6 August 2014
- Prime Minister: Plamen Oresharski
- Preceded by: Iskra Mihaylova
- Succeeded by: Svetlana Zhekova

Personal details
- Born: 5 June 1983 (age 42)
- Party: DPS – A New Beginning (since 2024); Movement for Rights and Freedoms

Stanislav Dimitrov Anastasov (Bulgarian: Станислав Димитров Анастасов; born 5 June 1983) is a Bulgarian politician. He has been a member of the National Assembly since 2021, having previously served from 2014 to 2017. In 2014, he served as minister of environment and water.
