= Bliznashki Government =

Government of Bulgaria (Aug–Nov 2014)

- 93rd Cabinet of Bulgaria

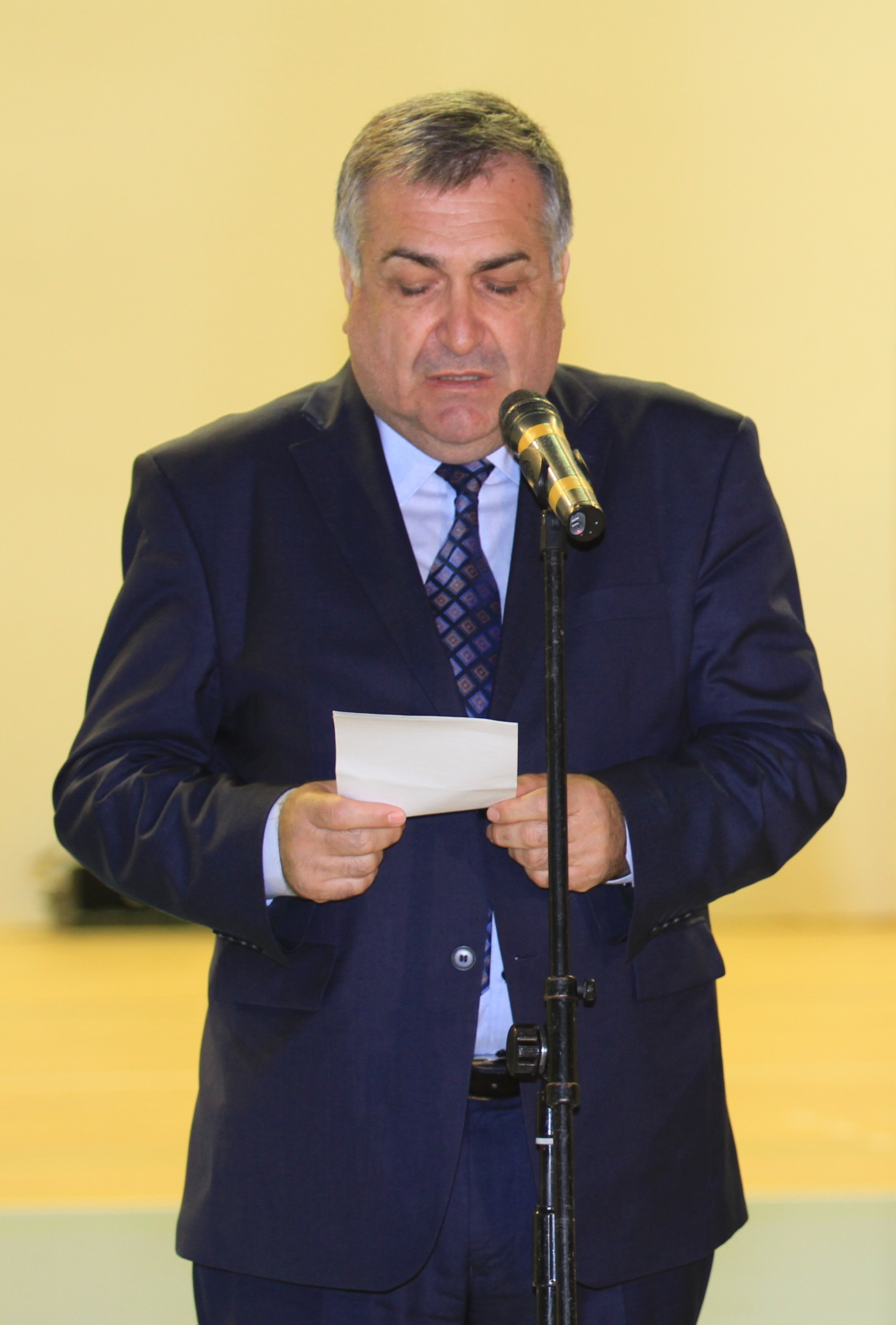
- Date formed: 6 August 2014
- Date dissolved: 7 November 2014

People and organisations
- Head of state: Rosen Plevneliev
- Head of government: Georgi Bliznashki
- Status in legislature: Provisional Government

History
- Predecessor: Oresharski Government
- Successor: Second Borisov Government

The Bliznashki Government was the ninety-third cabinet of Bulgaria which took office on 6 August 2014, following the resignation of the previous government. This cabinet was a caretaker government of technocrats designated to serve only until a new government could be elected with a popular mandate. The government, led by Prime Minister Georgi Bliznashki, was set up by President Rosen Plevneliev. A new government was formed after the early parliamentary elections on 5 October 2014.

== Cabinet ==
Ministry	Minister	Party
Prime Minister	Georgi Bliznashki	Independent
Deputy Prime Minister and Minister of Regional Development and Infrastructure Design	Ekaterina Zakharieva	Independent
Deputy Prime Minister and Minister of Labor and Social Policy	Yordan Hristoskov	Independent
Deputy Prime Minister and Minister of Justice	Hristo Ivanov	Independent
Deputy Prime Minister and Management of EU Funds	Iliyana Tsanova	Independent
Minister of Interior	Yordan Bakalov	Independent
Minister of Foreign Affairs	Daniel Mitov	Independent
Minister of Finance	Rumen Porozhanov	Independent
Minister of Economy, Energy and Tourism	Vassil Shtonov	Independent
Minister of Economy and Energy	Rumen Porozhanov	Independent
Minister of Education and Science	Rumyana Kolarova	Independent
Minister of Defence	Velizar Shalamanov	Independent
Minister of Agriculture and Food	Vasil Grudev	Independent
Minister of Transport, Information Technology and Communications	Nikolina Angelkova	Independent
Minister of Environment and Water	Svetlana Zhekova	Independent
Minister of Health	Miroslav Nenkov	Independent
Minister of Culture	Martin Ivanov	Independent
Minister of Youth and Sports	Evgenia Radanova	Independent

== Medarova appointment and pull out ==
On 8 August 2014 the president Rosen Plevneliev appointed the judge Krasimira Medarova, a former chief of the Central Election Committee, as the minister responsible for conducting the upcoming parliamentary elections. Two days later, on 10 August 2014, Medarova stepped down due to criticism for her former job as a chief of the Central Election Committee. Bliznashki gave up trying to appoint a separate elections minister, and instead announced that he will personally oversee the organisation of the elections.

== Miscellaneous ==
According to some media sources, this is the first post-1989 cabinet without any known former agents affiliated with the Committee for State Security.

== See also ==
- History of Bulgaria since 1989
