= Nikolay Nenovsky =

Bulgarian economist (born 1963)

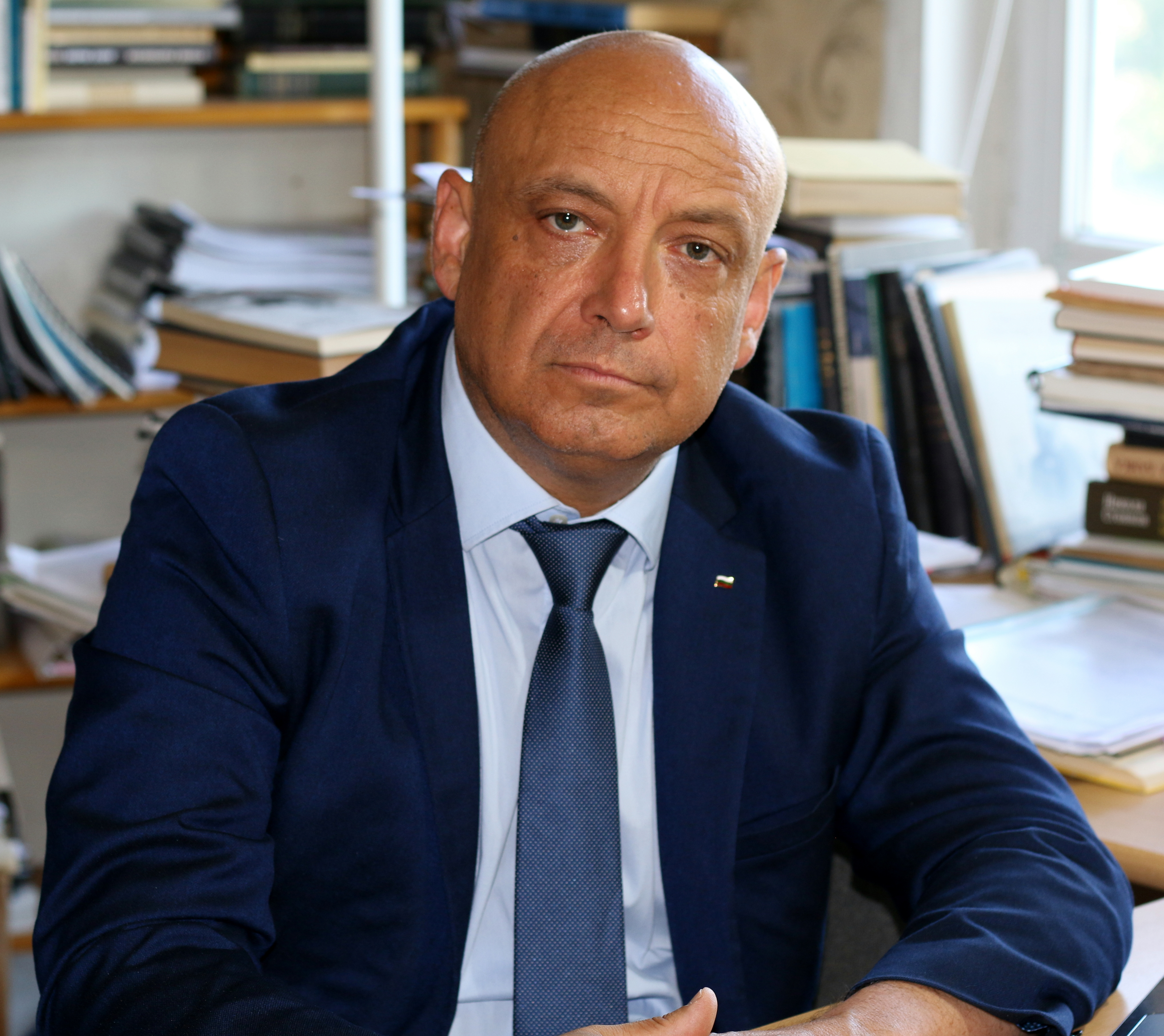
- Nikolay Nenovsky in August 2021.
- Born: 26 July 1963 (age 62); Veliko Turnovo, Bulgaria

Academic work
- Discipline: Monetary Theory, Monetary History and Monetary thought, Theory and History of Economic Crises
- Website: Information at IDEAS / RePEc

Nikolay Nenovsky (born 26 July 1963) is a Bulgarian economist, working in the fields of monetary theory and policy, monetary history and history of economic thought. He is Professor of economics at the University of Picardie Jules Verne, LEFMI, Amiens, France from 2012. Nikolay Nenovsky is currently associate researcher at SU HSE, department of theoretical economics and also associate professor at RUDN University. Since June 2020 he is a Member of the Governing Council of the Bulgarian Central Bank.

== Education and academic career ==
Nikolay Nenovsky graduated from the Moscow State University, Russia (M.A in 1989), received his Ph.D. in economics from the Bulgarian Academy of Sciences (1995). On completing his PhD he lectured at the University of National and World Economy, Sofia where, later, he became a professor of Economics and taught Monetary theory and International Finance. He is also affiliated to Laboratoire d'économie d'Orléans (LEO), since 2002 and to International Center for Economic Research (ICER)icer.it, Torino, since 2006.

Professor Nenovsky is affiliated with French academic and teaching community since 1991. Over the years he has held visiting positions at the several institutions including: University of Auvergne, University of Clermont-Ferrand University of Aix-Marseille, University of PARIS I – SORBONNE and University of Bordeaux IV. He has been visiting professor also at University of Kyoto and gave lectures and seminars at University of Kyushu (Fukuoka), University of Nagasaki, International University of Kagoshima and University of Hitotsubashi/Nihon University (Tokyo. He was STUDIUM (Institute for Advanced Studies) researcher at the University of Orleans (LEO), 2010–2012, where he organized conference on economic and geostrategic issues of Balkan economies (February 2011), and in December 2011 - on bank regulation and systemic risk. He also lectured Theory and History of financial crisis at EDHEC Business School, Nice.

He is Member of editorial board of: Revue d'économie politique (France), East-West Journal of Economics and Business (Greece), The Journal of Comparative Economic Studies (Japan), Panoeconomicus (Serbia), Economic Studies [Ikonomicheski Izsledvania], Bulgarian Academy of Sciences. Since 2011 Professor Nikolay Nenovsky is a member of UK based Cobden Partners. Nikolay Nenovsky is founder and vice-president of Bulgarian Macroeconomic Association (2003–2005), and founder of Bulgarian Hayek Society (2002) and BHS monthly seminar (since 2004) Nikolay Nenovsky is a participant in The State in the Balkans: Public Service Institutions, their Role and Development which is joint Balkan Futures workshop, of the British School at Athens, the British Institute at Ankara, and the École française d'Athènes, March 6–7, 2014.

== Central Bank and policy career ==
In 1996 he joined the Bulgarian National Bank Research Department, where he engaged over the years in empirical and theoretical research, focusing on the monetary theory and policy, econometric methods and modeling. He was made head of the research department in 1997. Nenovsky served as a Member of the Governing Council at the Bulgarian National Bank from 2002 to 2008. He was a Member of Economic Advisory Council of the President of Bulgaria, 2002–2008 (in charge of the Economic Report for the President). Nikolay Nenovsky was also Adviser of the Minister of Finance of Bulgaria (2008–2009). Since 2020, he was appointed again a Member of the Governing Council of the Bulgarian National Bank by the President of Bulgaria Rumen Radev.

== Major publications ==
All of Nikolay Nenovsky's publications are listed on ResearchGate.

=== Publications and research works ===
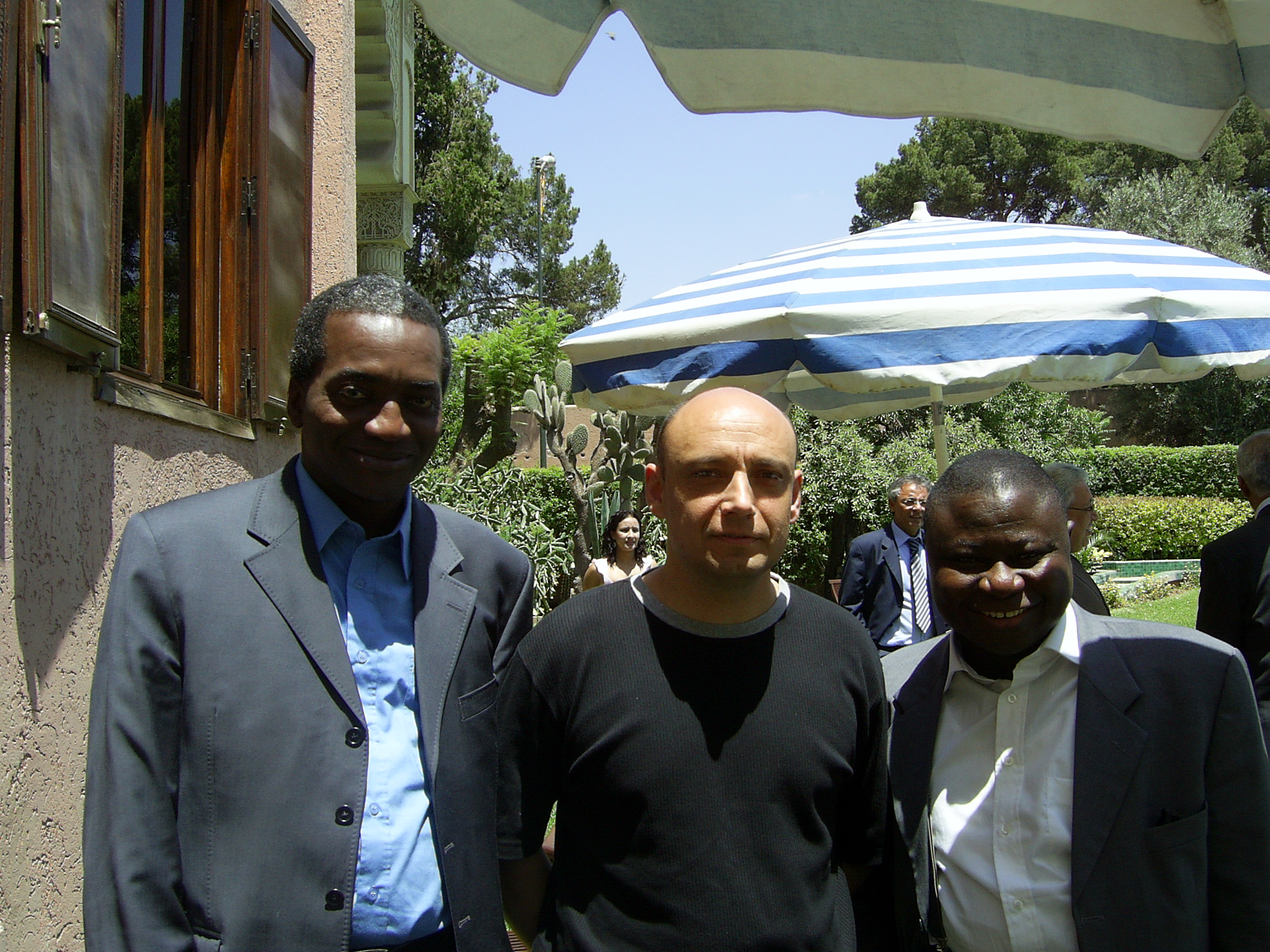
Nikolay Nenovsky with representatives from the National Bank of Rwanda in 2005

=== Refereed articles ===
- Nenovsky N., Magnin E, (2020). "Calculating without money. Theories of in-kind accounting of Alexander Chayanov, Otto Neurath and the early Soviet experiences", "European Journal of the History of Economic Thought", 28 (3).
- Nenovsky N., Tochkov, K. (2012)."University efficiency and public funding for higher education in Bulgaria ", Post-Communist Economies, 24 (4): 515–532.
- Nenovsky, N.(2013). «Ivan Kinkel's (1883–1945) theory of economic development », European Journal of the History of Economic Thought
- Nenovsky N., J. Milev (2012). Capital Pension Schemes in Bulgaria, Hungary and Slovakia and the Impact of the Ongoing Financial Crisis on them, East-West Journal of Economics and Business, 15 (1/2): 71–88.
- Nenovsky N., P. Villieu (2011). «EU enlargement and monetary regimes from the insurance model perspective» Post-Communist Economies, Vol. 23, Issue 4, ppp. 433–447.
- Nenovsky N. (2011). Criticisms of Classical Political Economy. Menger, Austrian Economics and the German Historical School (book review on G. Campagnolo), The European Journal of History of Economic Thought, 18 (2): 290–293.
- Nenovsky N., P. Chobanov and A. Lahiani (2011). Investigation of Systemic Risk in the New EU States, Economics Bulletin, 31 (2): 1041–1412.
- Nenovsky N., D. Ialnazov (2011). A Game Theory Interpretation of the Post-communist Evolution, Journal of Economic Issue, XLV (1): 41–55.
- Nenovsky N., K. Toshkov (2011) Reforms, EU accession, and Bank Efficiency in Transition economies: Evidence from Bulgaria, Emerging Markets Finance & Trade, XLVII (1): 113–129.
- Nenovsky N. (2011). «Bulgarian Economic Thought since 1989: A Personal Perspective», The History of Economic Thought (Japan), 52 (2): 1–26.
- Nenovsky N. (2010) The Birth of Modern Economic Science. Reading Gilles Campagnolo's Book (Criticism of Classical Political Economy, Routledge, 2010), Journal des Economistes et des Etudes Humaines, 16 (1): 5.
- Nenovsky N. (2009). Debates over the Crisis: A Special Focus on Bulgaria, The Journal of Comparative Economic Studies, (5): 19–24, 2
- Nenovsky N. (2009). "Place of Labor and Labor Theory in Tugan Baranovsky’s Theoretical System". The Kyoto Economic Review Vol. 78 (2009), No.1 pp. 53–77 ]
- Nenovsky N., P.Chobanov, G. Mihaylova, and D. Koleva (2008). How the Bank Efficiency Changes: the Case of Bulgaria, Megatrend Review, 5, (1): 5–16.
- Nenovsky N., JB Desquilbert)(2005). Confiance et ajustement dans les régimes de caisse d’émission, Monde en développement, 2 (130): 77–95.
- Nenovsky N., M. Berleman (2004). Lending of First versus Lending of Last Resort: The Bulgarian Financial Crisis of 1996–1997, Comparative Economic Studies, 46 (2): 245–271.
- Nenovsky N., Y. Rizopoulos (2004). Peut-on mesurer le changement institutionnel du régime monétaire?, Revue d’économie financière, (75): 17 –36.
- Nenovsky N. (2003). Improving Monetary Theory in Post –communist Countries – Looking back to Cantillon, Ecowest (Russian Economic Journal), III (4): 549–566. (in Russian)
- Nenovsky N (2003). Assurance des dépôts bancaires durant l’accession à l’UE, Revue d’économie financière, (72): 123–140.
- Nenovsky N., E. Peev and T. Yalamov (2003). Banks-Firms Nexus under the Currency Board: Empirical Evidence from Bulgaria, Revue d'études comparatives Est-Ouest, 34 (2): 53–81.
- Nenovsky N., Y. Rizopoulos (2003). Extreme Monetary Regime Change. Evidence from Currency Board Introduction in Bulgaria, Journal of Economic Issues, 37 (4): 909–941.
- Nenovsky N., K. Hristov (2002). New Currency Boards and Discretion. The Empirical Evidence from Bulgaria, Economic Systems, XXVI (1): 55–72.
- Nenovsky N., K. Hristov and M. Mihaylov (2002). Comparing Institutional and Organizational Design of Currency Boards in Transition Countries, Eastern European Economics, (40): 3–36.
- Nenovsky N., D. Ialnazov)(2001). The Currency Board and Bulgaria's Accession to the European Monetary Union, The Kyoto University Economic Review, LXX: 1/2 (148/149): 31–48.
- Nenovsky N., K. Hristov and M. Mihaylov (2001). Comparing Currency Board Automatic Mechanism in Bulgaria, Estonia and Lithuania, Journal des Economistes et des Etudes Humaines, 11 (4): 575–616.
- Nenovsky N. (1999). Une économie en transition a-t-elle vraiment besoin d’une banque centrale? (la Caisse d’émission en Bulgarie), Revue d'études comparatives Est-Ouest, (4): 65–96.

=== Books ===
- Economic Discussions at the European Periphery. Bulgarian Economists During the Great Depression 2010
- Monetary order. Critics of monetary theory, Siela Edition (Soft and Publishing), 2007, Sofia.
- Exchange rate Inflation: France and Bulgaria in the interwar period. The contribution of Albert Aftalion (1874–1956), Edition of Bulgarian National Bank, 2005, (in English, French and Bulgarian)
- From Lev to Euro: Which is the Best Way? Scenarios for Bulgaria integration to EMU, (with K. Hristov, B. Petrov), Siela Edition (Soft and Publishing), 2001, Sofia.
- Free Money (the questions of economic theory), Edition of Bulgarian Academy of Sciences, Academic Publishing House “Marin Drinov”, 2001, Sofia.
- The Demand for Money in Transitional economies, 1998, Sofia, Edition of Bulgarian Academy of Sciences, Academic Publishing House “Marin Drinov”.

=== Chapters in books ===
- Deposit Insurance around the World. Issues of Design and Implementation, MIT Press, Cambridge, Edited by Aslı Demirgüç-Kunt, Edward J. Kane and Luc Laeven, 2008
- Monetary Convergence on the Road to EMU: Conceptual Issues for Eastern Europe, in: Melting the Boundaries: Institutional Transformation in the Wider Europe, pp. 129–152, Yagi, K. and S. Mizobata, Eds, Kyoto University Press, 2008
- Exchange rate control in Italy and Bulgaria in the interwar period. History and Perspectives, (with G. Pavanelli, K. Dimitrova), in: The Experience of Exchange Rate Regimes in South-Eastern Europe in a historical and comparative perspective, Oesterreichische Nationalbank, 2007
- Le Currency board comme institution: une comparaison des expériences bulgare, estonienne et lithuanienne, (with D. Koleva) (2007), in: Nouvelles Europes. Trajectoires et enjeux économiques, Koleva, P., N. Ridet-Kroichvilli, J. Vercueil, Eds., UTBM, France, pp. 109–138.
- Money market liquidity under currency board-empirical investigations for Bulgaria, (with P. Chobanov) 2005, chapter 6, in Financial institutions and development, E. Klein Edition, New York
- Currency Boards and Financial Stability: Experiences from Argentina and Bulgaria, (with Berlemann, M.), in: Sovereign risk and financial crisis, Frenkel, M., Karmann, A., Scholtens, B., Eds), Springer–Verlag, 2004, pp. 237–257.
- The efficiency of banking system in CEE: inequality and convergence to the EU, (with Tomova, M. and Naneva, T.), in: Financial markets in CEE, Stability and efficiency perspectives, (Balling, M., Lierman, F., and Mullineux, A., eds), Routledge, London, 2004, pp. 225–251.
- The Banking System in Bulgaria (with Guglielmo Maria Caporale, Kalin Hristov, Jeffrey Miller, Boris Petrov), in: Banking Reforms in South-East Europe, Željko Šević (ed.), Edward Elgar Publishing, 2002, London, pp. 219–240.

== PhD students ==
Among his former PhD students are:

Petar Chobanov (Ph.D. thesis – Systemic risk, University of National and World Economy, Sofia, 2005), Chairman of the Financial Supervision Commission, Gerguana Mihaylova (financial system in transition, University of National and World Economy, 2007), Deputy President of National Statistical Institute, Darina Koleva (exchange rate regimes, co-tutelle, University of Orleans, France, 2006), Financial Supervision Commission – Head of the Office of the chairman, Desislava Tocheva (currency boards, co-tutelle, University of Orleans, France, 2004), Professor of Finance and Accounting, IFAG, Sofia, Katerina Vojcheska, Research Fellow III degree, Bulgarian Academy of Science, Souleymane Ndao, Institut des Politiques Publiques, Dakar, Senegal, Hicham Hachem, Council for Development & Reconstruction, CNAM Beyrouth. Wissam Samia, University of Picardie Jules Verne, France, 2021, PhD thesis subject: "Le Leadership institutionnel, vers un leadership institutionnel dans l’organisation, fondé sur la doctrine intellectuelle d’Antoun Saadeh" Le Leadership institutionnel, vers un leadership institutionnel dans l'organisation, fondé sur la doctrine intellectuelle d'Antoun Saadeh
