= Hassan Ademov =

Bulgarian politician

Hassan Ahmed Ademov
- Хасан Ахмед Адемов
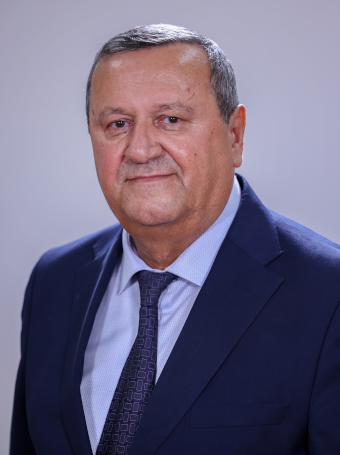
- Official portrait, 2025

Member of the National Assembly
- Incumbent
- Assumed office 11 November 2024
- Constituency: 18th MMC – Razgrad
- In office 27 October 2014 – 1 August 2022
- Constituency: 8th MMC – Dobrich (2017-2022); 18th MMC – Razgrad (2014-2017)
- In office 7 May 1997 – 29 May 2013
- Constituency: 18th MMC – Razgrad (1997-2013)

Minister of Labor and Social Policy
- In office 29 May 2013 – 6 August 2014
- Prime Minister: Plamen Oresharski
- Preceded by: Deyana Kostadinova
- Succeeded by: Yordan Hristoskov

Personal details
- Born: January 24, 1953 (age 73) Isperih, PR Bulgaria
- Party: DPS
- Other political affiliations: APS (since 2024)

Hassan Ahmed Ademov (Bulgarian: Хасан Ахмед Адемов; born 24 January 1953) is a Bulgarian politician of Turkish-Bulgarian origin. He was born in Isperih, Bulgaria.

Until 6 August 2014, he was a Minister of Labor and Social Policy in the Oresharski cabinet.
