= 18th MMC – Razgrad =

Bulgarian constituency

Coordinates: 43°30′N 26°35′E

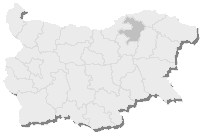
Map of Bulgaria, 18th MMC – Razgrad is highlighted

The 18th Multi-member Constituency – Razgrad is a constituency whose borders are the same as Razgrad Province in Bulgaria.

== Background ==
In the 2009 Bulgarian parliamentary election the 18th Multi-member Constituency – Razgrad elected 5 members to the Bulgarian National Assembly: 4 of which were by proportionality vote and 1 was by first-past-the-post voting.

== Members in the Bulgarian National Assembly ==
- Through first-past-the-post voting

Election	Member	Party
2009		

- Through proportionality vote

Election	Member	Party
2009		
2009		
2009		
2009		

== Elections ==
2009 election

- proportionality vote

Party	Votes	%	Change	Seats	Change
Citizens for European Development of Bulgaria					
Coalition for Bulgaria					
Movement for Rights and Freedoms					
National Union Attack					
National Movement for Stability and Progress					
Blue Coalition					
Lider (Bulgaria)					
Order, Lawfulness, Justice					
Others			—		—
Total-Valid			—		
Invalid		—	—	—	—
Total Turnout		—	—	—	—

- first-past-the-post voting

Party	Candidate	Votes	%	Change
Citizens for European Development of Bulgaria	Stoyan Stoyanov			
Coalition for Bulgaria	Nasko Anastasov			
Movement for Rights and Freedoms	Hasan Ademov			
National Union Attack	Georgi Georgiev			
National Movement for Stability and Progress	Dr. Valeri Tsekov			
Blue Coalition	Mitko Hanchev			
Lider (Bulgaria)	Maria Pirgova			
Others				
Total Turnout			—	—

== See also ==
- 2009 Bulgarian parliamentary election
- Politics of Bulgaria
- List of Bulgarian Constituencies
