= Milen Veltchev =

Bulgarian politician

- Милен Велчев
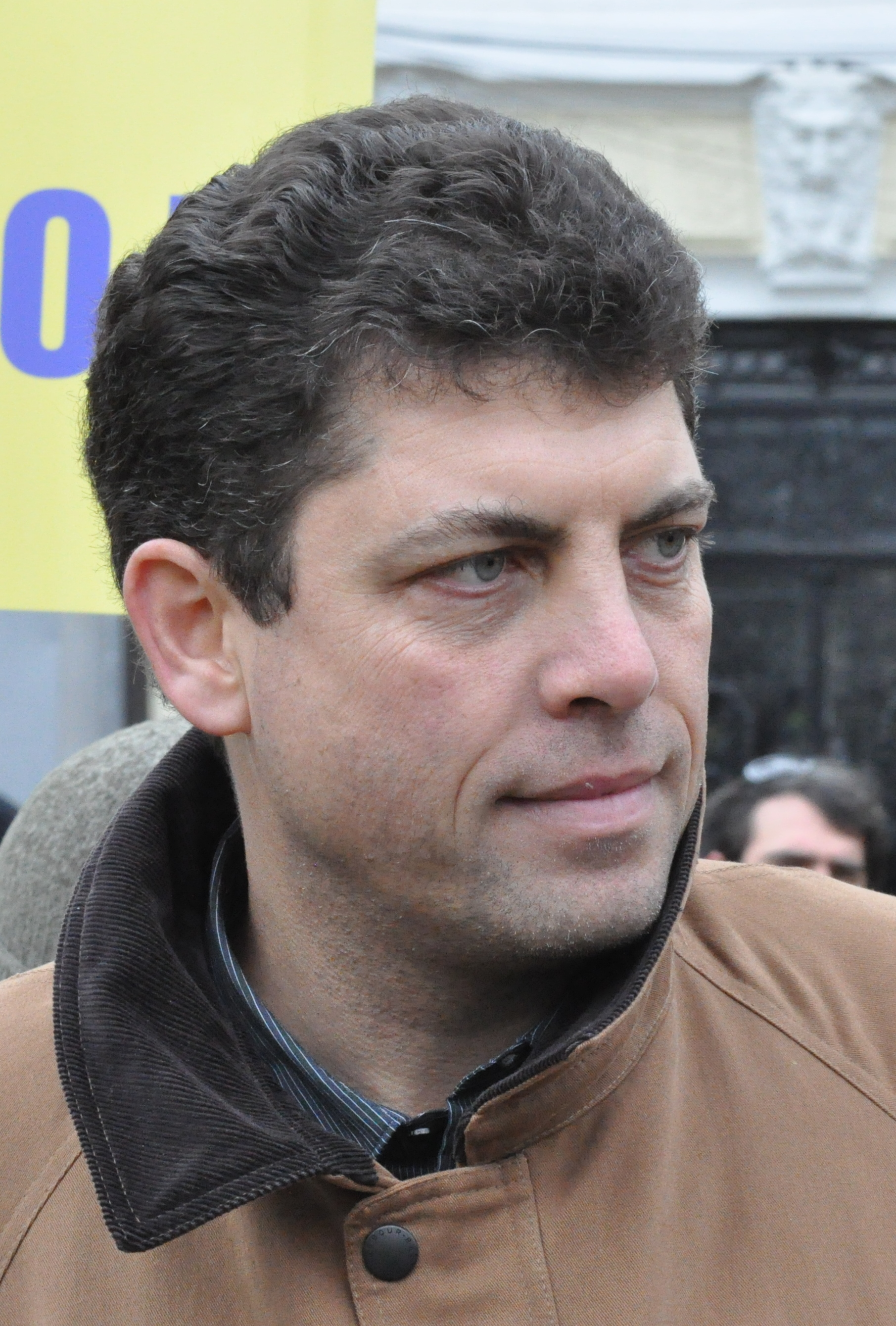
- Veltchev in 2010

Minister of Finance of Bulgaria
- In office 24 July 2001 – 17 August 2005
- Prime Minister: Simeon Saxe-Coburg-Gotha
- Preceded by: Muravey Radev
- Succeeded by: Plamen Oresharski

Personal details
- Born: 24 March 1966 (age 60)
- Education: MIT Sloan School of Management; University of National and World Economy

Milen Emilov Veltchev (Bulgarian: Милен Емилов Велчев, romanized: Milen Emilov Velchev; born 24 March 1966) is a Bulgarian former politician who served as Minister of Finance from 2001 until 2005. He previously worked in finance at Merrill Lynch in London.

He holds MS and BS degrees from the University of National and World Economy in Sofia, Bulgaria; a BA from the University of Rochester and an MBA from the MIT Sloan School of Management.

== Public scandals ==
=== Yacht scandal ===
In April 2003, a report from the Bulgarian Interior Ministry showed a photograph of Finance Minister Veltchev aboard a yacht in Monaco with Ivan "The Doctor" Todorov, a known contraband kingpin. Veltchev denied the claims that he worked with Todorov, calling them fabricated attempts to discredit his anti-smuggling reforms, while acknowledging his presence on the yacht. In August 2003, Veltchev tendered his resignation, citing the lack of political support for his conservative fiscal policies and disappointment that law enforcement had not publicly cleared his name in the wake of these contraband-links allegations.

=== Foreign debt swap ===
In 2005, Bulgaria's Chief Prosecutor opened an investigation into a financial deal made during Veltchev's finance minister tenure—specifically, a foreign debt swap from U.S. dollars to euros. The case had been dropped in 2004 because the transaction occurred in London, complicating prosecution, but was reopened when new evidence surfaced.
