= 5th MMC – Vidin =

Bulgarian constituency

Coordinates: 43°48′N 22°41′E

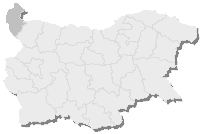
Map of Bulgaria, 5th MMC - Vidin is highlighted.

5th Multi-member Constituency – Vidin is a constituency whose borders are the same as Vidin Province in Bulgaria.

== Background ==
In the 2009 Bulgarian parliamentary election 5th Multi-member Constituency – Vidin elected 4 members to the Bulgarian National Assembly, 3 of which were through proportionality vote and 1 was through first-past-the-post voting.

== Members in the Bulgarian National Assembly ==
- Through first-past-the-post voting

| Election | Member | Party |
|---|---|---|
| 2009 | | |

- Through proportionality vote

| Election | Member | Party |
|---|---|---|
| 2009 | | |
| 2009 | | |
| 2009 | | |

== Elections ==
2009 election

- proportionality vote

| Party | Votes | % | Change | Seats | Change | |
|---|---|---|---|---|---|---|
| Citizens for European Development of Bulgaria | | | | | | |
| Coalition for Bulgaria | | | | | | |
| Movement for Rights and Freedoms | | | | | | |
| National Union Attack | | | | | | |
| National Movement for Stability and Progress | | | | | | |
| Blue Coalition | | | | | | |
| Lider (Bulgaria) | | | | | | |
| Order, Lawfulness, Justice | | | | | | |
| Others | | | | — | | — |
| Total-Valid | | | | '— | | |
| Invalid | | | — | — | — | — |
| Total Turnout | | | — | — | — | — |

- first-past-the-post voting

| Party | Candidate | Votes | % | Change |
|---|---|---|---|---|
| Citizens for European Development of Bulgaria | Lyubomila Stanislavova | | | |
| Coalition for Bulgaria | Radoslav Gaidarski | | | |
| National Union Attack | Emil Lilov | | | |
| National Movement for Stability and Progress | Nina Chilova | | | |
| Blue Coalition | Genadi Velkov | | | |
| Lider (Bulgaria) | Tsvetanka Petrova | | | |
| Order, Lawfulness, Justice | Kristiana Petrova | | | |
| Others | | | | |
| Total Turnout | | | — | — |

== See also ==
- 2009 Bulgarian parliamentary election
- Politics of Bulgaria
- List of Bulgarian Constituencies
