= Daniela Bobeva =

Bulgarian Deputy Prime Minister (born 1958)

- Даниела Бобева

Deputy Prime Minister
- In office 29 May 2013 – 6 August 2014
- Prime Minister: Plamen Oresharski

Personal details
- Born: 8 September 1958 (age 67) Sofia, Bulgaria
- Education: University of National and World Economy

Daniela Bobeva (Bulgarian: Даниела Бобева; born 8 September 1958) is a former Bulgarian Deputy Prime Minister. By trade, an economist, she has served in several cabinet level positions including Minister of Trade and Economic Cooperation, as well as at the Foreign Investment Agency. She was Vice President in the Black Sea Trade and Development Bank and served for a decade as the head of the international division of the Bulgarian National Bank.

== Biography ==
Daniela Bobeva was born in Sofia, Bulgaria. In 1982, she graduated from the Karl Marx Higher Institute of Economics (now the University of National and World Economy). with a degree in Political economics. In 1990, she completed a Doctorate of Economic Sciences and from 1991 to 1992, she worked in the Ministry of Welfare as head of the Employment and Labour Market Department. Between 1993 and 1994 she served as Director of the Economic Program at the Center for the Study of Democracy.

During the term of Prime Minister Zhan Videnov, Bobev served as a member of the Committee on Foreign Investment (1994-1995), Chairman of the Foreign Investment Agency (1995-1996) and Director of the Board for International Cooperation of the Bulgarian National Bank (1996-1997). She was appointed as Minister of Trade and Economic Cooperation when Stefan Sofiyanski took over as prime minister in 1997. In 1998, she went to work for the Black Sea Trade and Development Bank, one of the primary economic development financiers for the Bulgarian government, in Thessaloniki, Greece. She worked her way up to Vice President of the organization.

In 2001, Bobeva worked with Sofiyanski to found the Union of Free Democrats and between 2003 and 2013 she led the international division of the Bulgarian Central Bank. In May 2013, she was appointed as deputy prime minister in charge of economic policies, foreign investment and oversight of administrative services for business and citizens.
