= Petar Chobanov =

Bulgarian politician (born 1976)

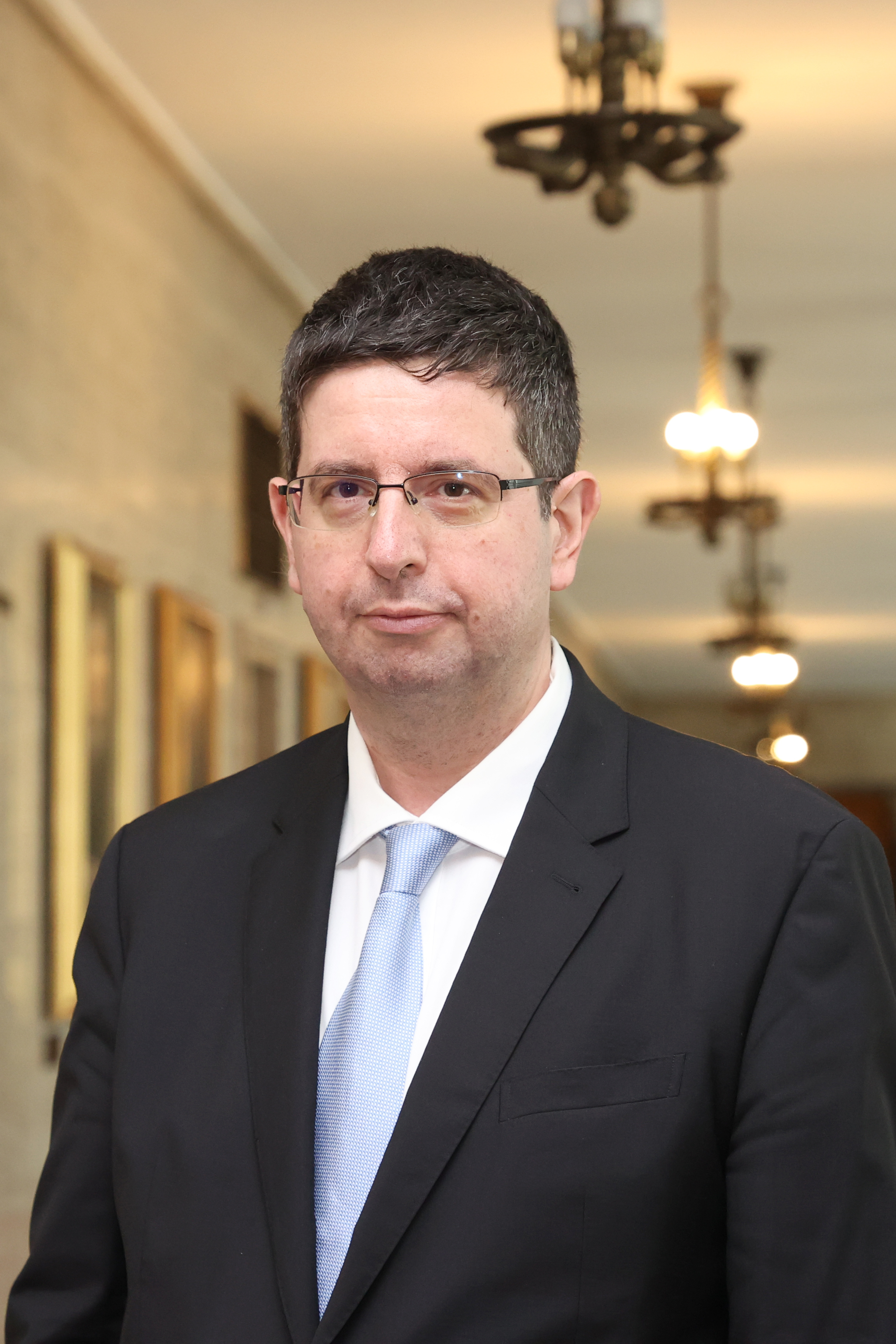
- Chobanov in 2023

Minister of Finance
- In office 29 May 2013 – 6 August 2014
- Prime Minister: Plamen Oresharski
- Preceded by: Kalin Hristov
- Succeeded by: Rumen Porodzanov

Personal details
- Born: 20 July 1976 (age 49) Yambol, Bulgaria

Petar Pandushev Chobanov (Bulgarian: Петър Пандушев Чобанов; born 20 July 1976) is a Bulgarian politician. He was a member of the National Assembly from 2013 to 2017 and from 2021 to 2023. From 2013 to 2014, he served as minister of finance.
