= History of Bulgaria (1990–present) =

Period of Bulgarian history that begins after the fall of Communism in 1990

The history of Bulgaria from 1990 to the present refers to the period of Bulgarian history beginning with the fall of Communism and the transition to a market economy through to the modern day. The period began with substantial changes to the Bulgarian political system, including the adoption of a new constitution. The democratic reforms culminated in the country's accession to the European Union (EU) in 2007. In the years since, Bulgarian politics have continued to evolve, and the country has seen a number of different governments form and collapse. Bulgaria saw a particularly high rate of political turnover from 2021–2026.

== End of Communist rule ==
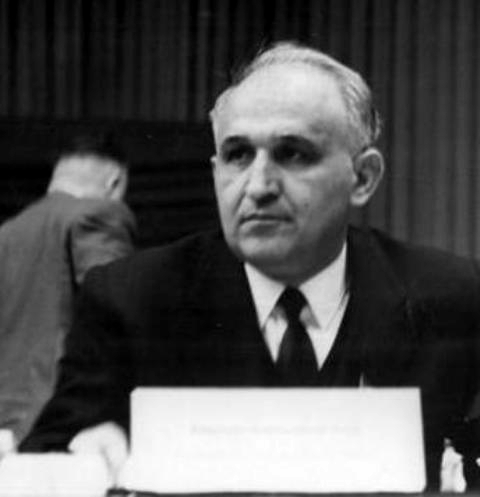
In 1989 Todor Zhivkov was removed from power after 35 years at the helm of the Communist Party.

The reforms towards liberalization, both social, political and economic in the Eastern Bloc started with Mikhail Gorbachev's reform program in the Soviet Union which was felt in Bulgaria in the late 1980s. In fact, the release of tightening started with the end of the Stalinist era and continued slowly to the point that many previously forbidden literary texts were translated, the same was relevant for Hollywood movies, etc., stores appeared with Western products that had elements of advertisement (advertisement of products was generally unknown and not used in the Eastern Bloc since everything was accessible and the same to all), these new features of the late communist years acknowledged the gradual breaking of the Iron Curtain for the Comecon people. This, together with the policies of Gorbachev, led to more freedom and expectations for democracy among people.

In November 1989, demonstrations on ecological issues were staged in Sofia, and these soon broadened into a general campaign for political reform. That communists generally did not break the demonstrations was a sign of a possible change that would come. In fact, communist politicians reacted by eventually voting for the removal of Todor Zhivkov as a communist party and country head and replacing him with Petar Mladenov, but this gained them only a short respite in power. In February 1990 the Communist Party, forced by street protests gave up its claim on power and in June 1990 the first free elections since 1931 were held, won by the Bulgarian Socialist Party (the new name of the Communist Party). In July 1991 a new constitution was adopted, which regulates a representative elected president and a prime minister and cabinet.

== Transition ==
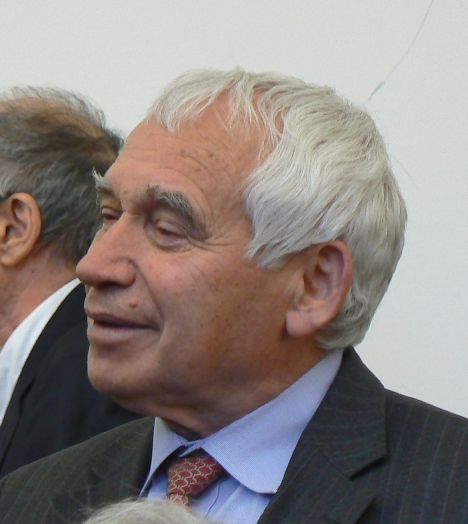
Zhelyu Zhelev was the first democratically elected president of the Republic of Bulgaria. He is considered the father of democracy or the head of the democratic changes.

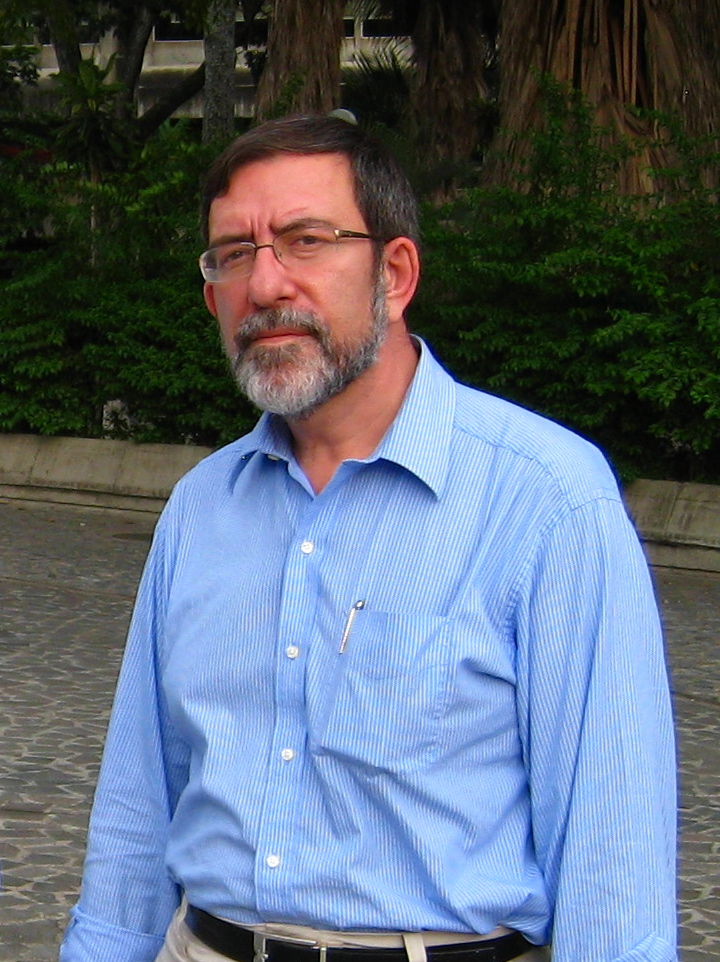
Philip Dimitrov was one of the first democratic leaders in the early 1990s, serving from 1991 to 1992.

Like the other post-socialist regimes in eastern Europe, Bulgaria found the transition to capitalism rather painful and not easy as expected. The anti-Communist Union of Democratic Forces (in Bulgarian: СДС, SDS) took office between 1991 and 1992 to carry through the privatization of agricultural land, properties and industry issuing shares in government enterprises to all citizens, but these were accompanied by massive unemployment as industries were no longer tightened to the broken Comecon and failed in competition of the global market without the participation of Bulgaria to new regional or world trade organizations, at the same time Bulgaria's industry showed to be backward which was amendable but in the hurry of political changes neither government, nor people were ready for industrial modernization. In fact the disbandment of former State security that was tightened to the Communist party (Bulgarian: ДС, DS) although brought relief to many Bulgarian people previously feared to speak or express other than communist views, at the same time boosted criminality never seen before in Bulgaria. The police were not ready to care about and chase the criminality which was before kept low with the fearful methods of DS. This led to mass stealing of capital, machinery, materials and even furniture from the industry and also institutions. Referring to industry this led to soon failing to work of many factories, etcetera

== Zhan Videnov (1995–1997) ==
The Socialists (former Communists) presented their political visions as the defenders of the poor against the excesses of the free market. Reaction against economic reforms appeared because reforms left many unemployed (unemployment was almost nonexistent before in Bulgaria) and many towns literally was left to drop economically just in months, this allowed Zhan Videnov of the Bulgarian Socialist Party to win the 1994 parliamentary elections. Videnov was very young when he stepped in the PM post and his inability to show political strength and his incompetence was soon acknowledged by people surrounding him who took advantage of it for own purposes and personal enrichment. This incompetence and the misguided policies of the Socialist government in all exacerbated the economic conditions. The government was clearly unsupported by Western countries and thus Bulgarian foreign policy seriously suffered, and in 1996 the economy fell into hyperinflation and many banks went bankrupt. In the presidential elections of that year the SDS's Petar Stoyanov was elected. In 1997 the BSP government collapsed after a month of nationwide protests and government was appointed by the President Stoyanov which coped to calm the economic situation. Later the democratic party of SDS came to power.

== Ivan Kostov (1997–2001) ==
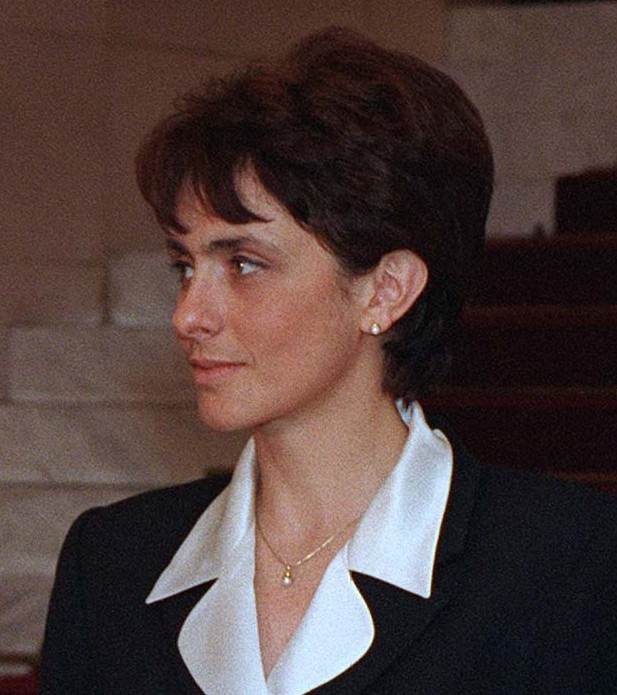
Between 1997 and 2001, much of the success of the Ivan Kostov government was due to Foreign Minister Nadezhda Mihaylova, who had huge approval and support in Bulgaria and abroad.

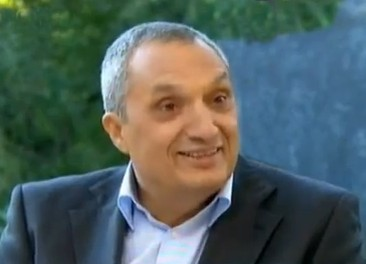
Ivan Kostov came to power in May 1997 after months of popular discontent and hyperinflation.

The new Democratic government headed by Ivan Kostov enjoyed strong support and moved the Bulgarian economy ahead, but allegations of corruption and inability to cope with some of the serious problems in the country caused frustration. The electorate became to some extent dissatisfied with both parties – BSP and SDS. At that point Stoyanov, who still held some good positions and had public approval, took part in presidential elections seeking a second mandate, but he scandalously failed with a blunder on TV and lost support, and the elections too. The newly elected president, former BSP leader Georgi Parvanov, was not very well known to the public although he was in politics since the early 1990s, and was well received for his wise political behavior. Although a BSP candidate, he was rather perceived as an independent figure and he also always stated to be president to all Bulgarians without any political reference. At that point with the already dissatisfaction with both BSP and SDS, people were looking for new alternatives and new politicians.

== The return of Simeon II (2001–2005) ==
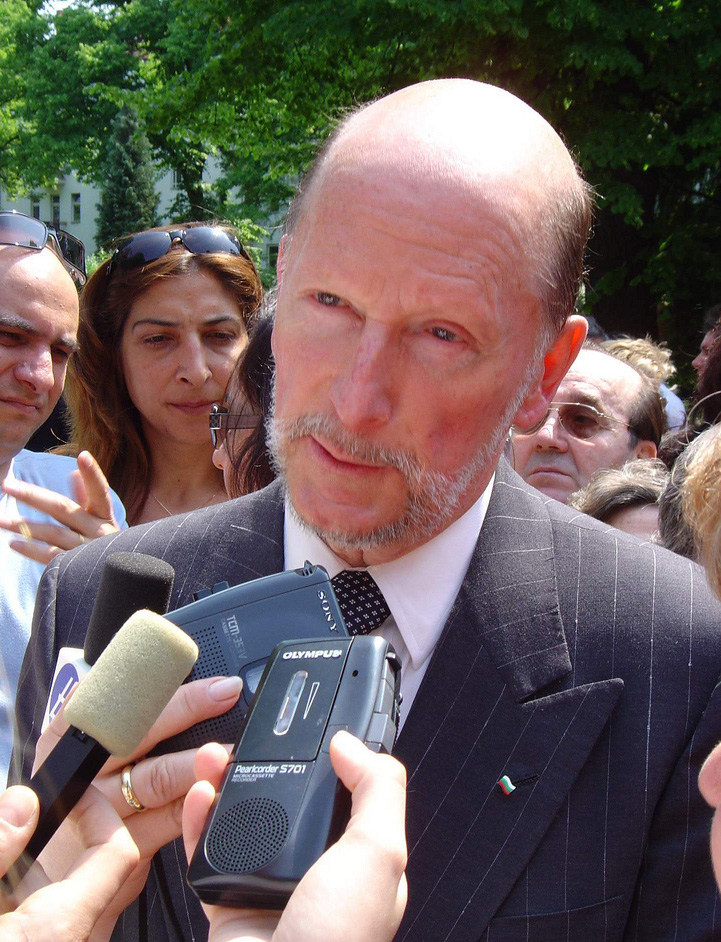
Simeon Saxe-Coburg-Gotha was the last king of Bulgaria, serving from 1943 to 1946. Half a century later, he served as prime minister from 2001 to 2005.

In 2001, Simeon Saxe-Coburg-Gotha (Bulgarian: Симеон Сакскобурготски, Simeon Sakskoburgotski), son of Tsar Boris III of Bulgaria, who had fled from socialist Bulgaria as a nine-year-old boy in 1946, became Prime Minister of Bulgaria. Several years prior to that, in 1996, he had visited Bulgaria with his family of two princes and a princess and it was then when he announced he would soon come back to his homeland to form a new political party. Several years later, Sakskoburggotski formed the National Movement Simeon II (NDSV) and swept away both major parties in the elections of June 2001 with a landslide victory. As prime minister, he followed a strong and strictly pro-western course, as a result of which Bulgaria joined NATO in 2004 and the European Union in 2007. Economic and political conditions visibly improved, although economic growth was not as high as expected and unemployment and emigration remained high. Problematic areas remained, those including but not limited to corruption, health care, organized crime (though scaled down), and higher education, which all need to be massively reformed.

== The Triple Coalition (2005–2009) ==
Form more information on the cabinet, see Stanishev Government.

Sergei Stanishev served as Prime Minister of Bulgaria from 2005 to 2009. His government was composed of BSP, NDSV and DPS. At the 2005 parliamentary elections the NDSV did not reach enough votes to form a government. In fact, the BSP gained the largest share of the votes, followed by the NDSV. None of the parties had enough seats in Parliament to establish a government on their own. After more than a month of negotiations initiated by President Parvanov for the forming of coalition government that was needed to join the EU, a coalition was formed between BSP, NDSV and MRF (the Movement for Rights and Freedoms). Although divided by deep ideological and political differences, the three parties were united by a major goal: accomplishing the reforms necessary for joining the European Union in 2007. However, ineffective administration and high-level corruption remained serious problems that were limiting the entrance of foreign businesses and entrepreneurs to the country. Additionally, Sergei Stanishev's government was caught in his last months by the world financial crisis but denied its existence and refused to initiate steps for protecting the Bulgarian economy from it for which he received wide disapproval.

== First cabinet of Boyko Borisov (2009–2013) ==
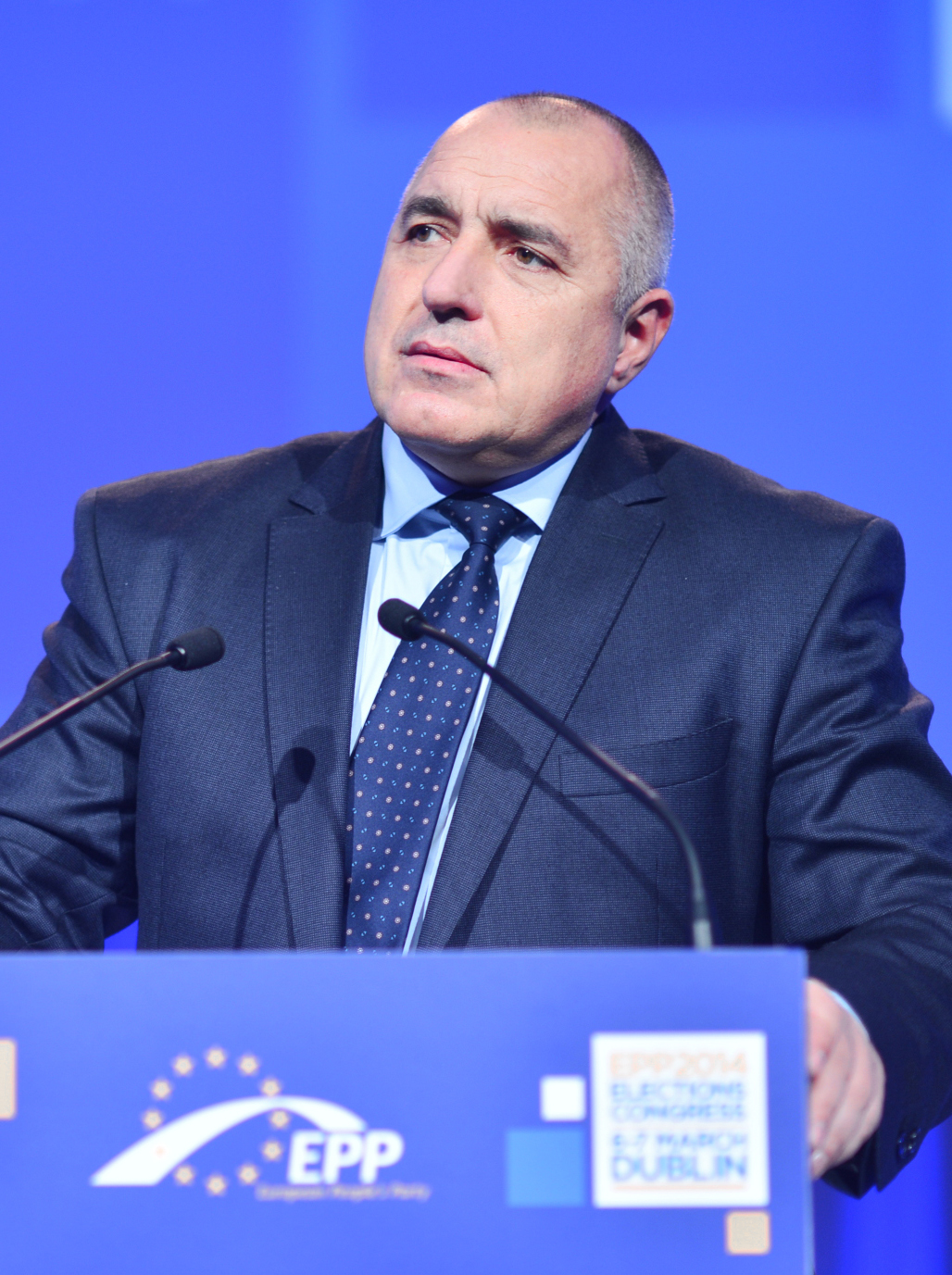
Boyko Borisov, Prime Minister of Bulgaria (2009–2013; 2017–2021).

In the parliamentary elections in 2009 the center-right party Citizens for European Development of Bulgaria (GERB) won, taking 117 seats in the 240-seats Parliament. The Socialists were a distant second, with 40 seats. NDSV failed to win a single seat in Parliament. The new government of Boyko Borisov stated some serious intentions for educational changes for liberation of the system and ability of students to easily choose universities and most important placed the accent on fiscal discipline. In particular, the Ministry of Finance reduced the budget deficit following a policy of administrative reform and privatization. Subsidies to state-owned enterprises in the transport and energy sectors were cut. Deputy Prime Minister Simeon Djankov led a reform team that included the Minister of Infrastructure Rosen Plevneliev, the Minister of Economy Traycho Traykov and the Minister of Environment Nona Karadjova. The government fell on 20 February 2013 after multiple street protests, over strictly imposed austerity measures and sustained fiscal stability encouraged by the European Union and the International Monetary Fund during the recession, but also delayed government payments to private companies, and also wiretapping scandals involving the Minister of the Interior Tsvetan Tsvetanov.

== Plamen Oresharski (2013–2014) ==
The government of Plamen Oresharski was not well accepted, leading to yearlong protests, ultimately resulting in its downfall in 2014.

== Second cabinet of Boyko Borisov (2017–2021) ==
In March 2017, Boyko Borisov was re-elected as Prime Minister of Bulgaria for the second time. Borisov had resigned and called early elections after his conservative GERB party lost the presidential elections the previous year. He formed a coalition government with nationalist VMRO-BND and National Front for Salvation of Bulgaria. The Socialist Party and the Turkish DPS party formed the opposition.

In April 2021, Borisov's party won the parliamentary election. It was again the largest party of the parliament, but it did not get the absolute majority, indicating difficult coalition talks. Bulgarian President Rumen Radev, a vocal critic and rival of prime minister Borisov, announced that he will run for a second five-year term of office in presidential elections in autumn 2021.

Borisov's last cabinet saw a dramatic decrease in freedom of the press, and a number of corruption revelations that triggered yet another wave of mass protests in 2020. GERB came out first in the regular April 2021 election, but with its weakest result so far.

== Stefan Yanev as Interim Prime Minister (2021) ==
All other parties refused to form a government, and after a brief deadlock, another election was called for July 2021, with Stefan Yanev serving as an interim Prime Minister of a caretaker cabinet until then.

In the July 2021 snap election, the anti-elite party called There Is Such a People (ITN) finished first with 24.08 percent of the vote, and former prime minister Boyko Borisov's GERB-led coalition was finished second, with 23.51 percent of the vote.

In November 2021, President Rumen Radev was re-elected in the presidential election with a very low turnout of 34 per cent.

== The Quadruple coalition (2021–2022) ==
The next snap election was in November of the same year. Kiril Petkov's PP party emerged as surprise victors over the conservative GERB party, which had dominated Bulgarian politics in the last nine years. In December 2021, Bulgaria's parliament formally elected Kiril Petkov as the country's next prime minister, ending a months-long political crisis. The new centrist-led government – a coalition led by Petkov's anti-corruption We Continue the Change party (PP) and three other political groups – the left-wing Bulgarian Socialist Party, the anti-elite There Is Such A People party, and the liberal group Democratic Bulgaria. They together controlled 134 seats in Bulgaria's 240-seat parliament. The government received a vote of no confidence of 23 June 2022 and submitted its resignation. President Radev appointed Galab Donev as acting prime minister to lead a caretaker cabinet. Bulgaria's fourth parliamentary elections in less than two years were held on 2 October 2022. However, the results of the October 2022 elections did not enable formation of new government.

== The rotation government/The (No)coalition (2023–2024) ==
In April 2023, because of the political deadlock, Bulgaria held its fifth parliamentary election since February 2021. GERB was the biggest, winning 69 seats. The bloc led by We Continue the Change won 64 seats in the 240-seat parliament. In June 2023, Prime Minister Nikolai Denkov formed a new coalition between We Continue the Change and GERB. According to the coalition agreement, Denkov will lead the government for the first nine months. He will be succeeded by former European Commissioner, Mariya Gabriel, of the GERB party. She will take over as prime minister after nine months.

== The second Triple coalition (2025–2026) ==
The government of Rosen Zhelyazkov was elected of 16 January 2025 from the majority of GERB, BSP and There Is Such A People (ITN) with the help of APS. As Bulgaria begins to replace their currency, lev with the euro, starting in 2026, protests were organized in June 2025 against the government's decision and demanded a referendum on the issue.

== The cabinet of Rumen Radev (2026-) ==
In January 2026 Bulgaria's president Rumen Radev resigned from the mostly ceremonial role of presidency before the snap election. On 8 May 2026, Rumen Radev was sworn in as Bulgaria's prime minister after a landslide victory of his party, Progressive Bulgaria, in the April general election.
