= Rosen Plevneliev =

President of Bulgaria from 2012 to 2017

- Росен Плевнелиев
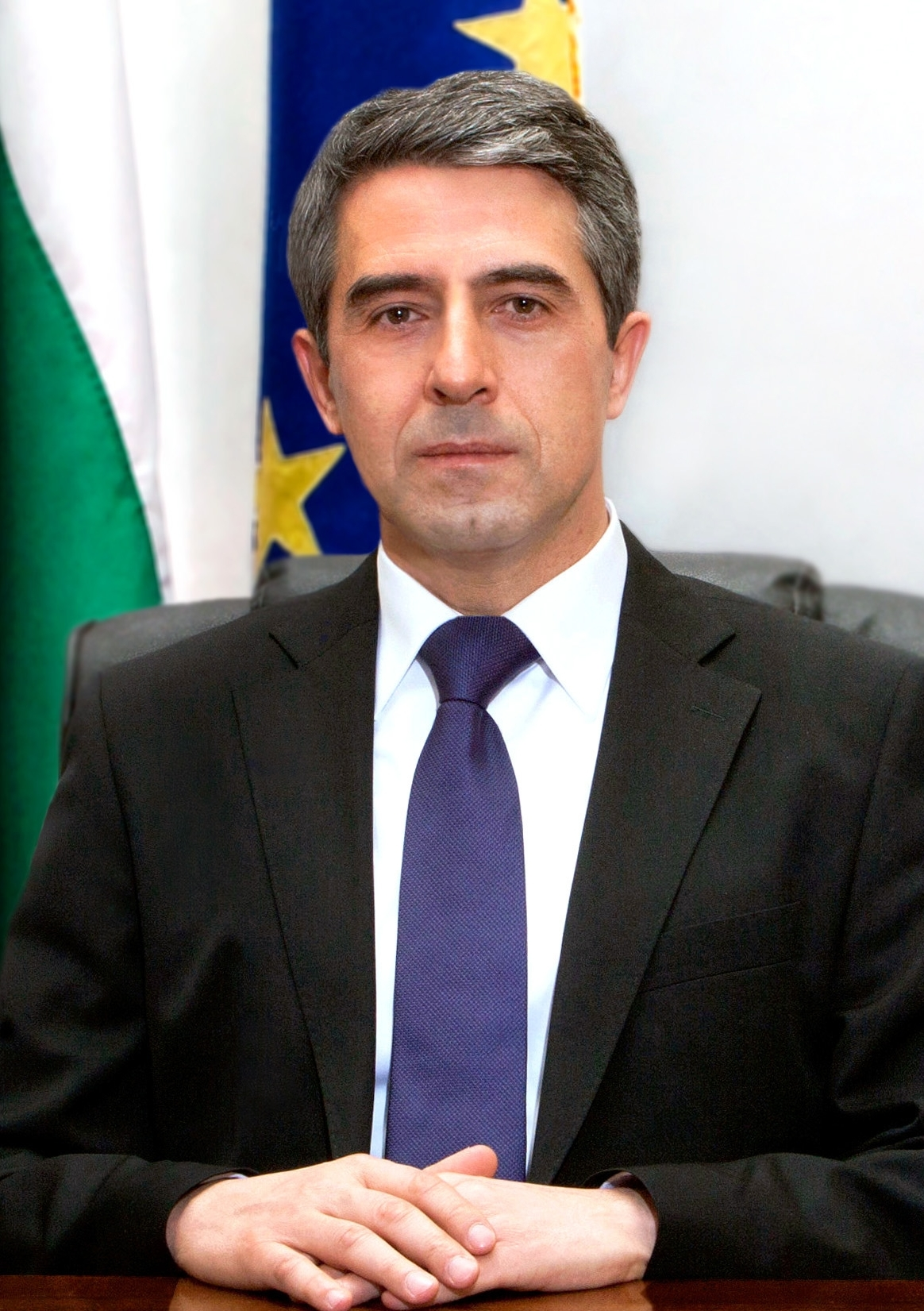
- Official portrait, 2012

President of Bulgaria
- In office 22 January 2012 – 22 January 2017
- Prime Minister: See list: Boyko Borisov; Marin Raykov; Plamen Oresharski; Georgi Bliznashki; Boyko Borisov
- Vice President: Margarita Popova
- Preceded by: Georgi Parvanov
- Succeeded by: Rumen Radev

Minister of Regional Development and Public Works
- In office 27 July 2009 – 9 September 2011
- Prime Minister: Boyko Borisov
- Preceded by: Asen Gagauzov
- Succeeded by: Lilyana Pavlova

Personal details
- Born: Rosen Asenov Plevneliev; 14 May 1964 (age 62) Gotse Delchev, PR Bulgaria
- Party: Independent (since 1989)
- Other political affiliations: GERB (Minister in the Government of GERB (2009-2011); GERB presidential nominee in the 2011 election); Communist Party (Until 1989)
- Spouses: Veronika Kavrakova (divorced) Yuliyana Plevnelieva (m. 2000; div. 2017) Desislava Banova (m. 2018)
- Children: Filip (died 2015), Asen, Pavel, Yoan
- Education: Technical University, Sofia
- Occupation: Politician; entrepreneur; engineer
- Awards: Order of the Southern Cross

Rosen Asenov Plevneliev (Bulgarian: Росен Асенов Плевнелиев, born 14 May 1964) is a Bulgarian politician who served as the president of Bulgaria from 2012 to 2017. Affiliated with the GERB party, he previously served as Minister of Regional Development and Public Works from 2009 to 2011.

== Biography ==
Rosen Plevneliev was born in Gotse Delchev. His mother, Slavka Plevnelieva, was a teacher, and his father, Asen Plevneliev, was an activist of the Communist Party. He relocated to Blagoevgrad alongside his parents when he turned 10 years old. His family descended from Bulgarian refugees from southern Macedonia who resettled from today's village of Petrousa in the municipality of Prosotsani in Drama regional unit, Greek Macedonia, in 1913. The Plevneliev family name refers to the Bulgarian name of the village Petroussa, Plevnya (Плевня, "barn").

Plevneliev studied at Blagoevgrad Mathematical and Natural Sciences High School, from which he graduated in 1982. In 1989 he graduated from the Higher Mechanical-Electrotechnical Institute, Sofia, and in the same year become a fellow at the Institute for Microprocessing Technology, Pravets. While studying in the university, he was a Komsomol member of the Bulgarian Communist Party. After the political changes, in 1990, Plevneliev started a private building company in Bulgaria. Among other projects, the company built the Sofia Business Park.

He was married to the journalist Yuliyana Plevnelieva from 2000 until their divorce in 2017; they had three sons: Filip, Asen and Pavel. One of the sons, Filip, died in 2015 at the age of 14. In addition to his native Bulgarian, he speaks English and German fluently.

== Political career ==
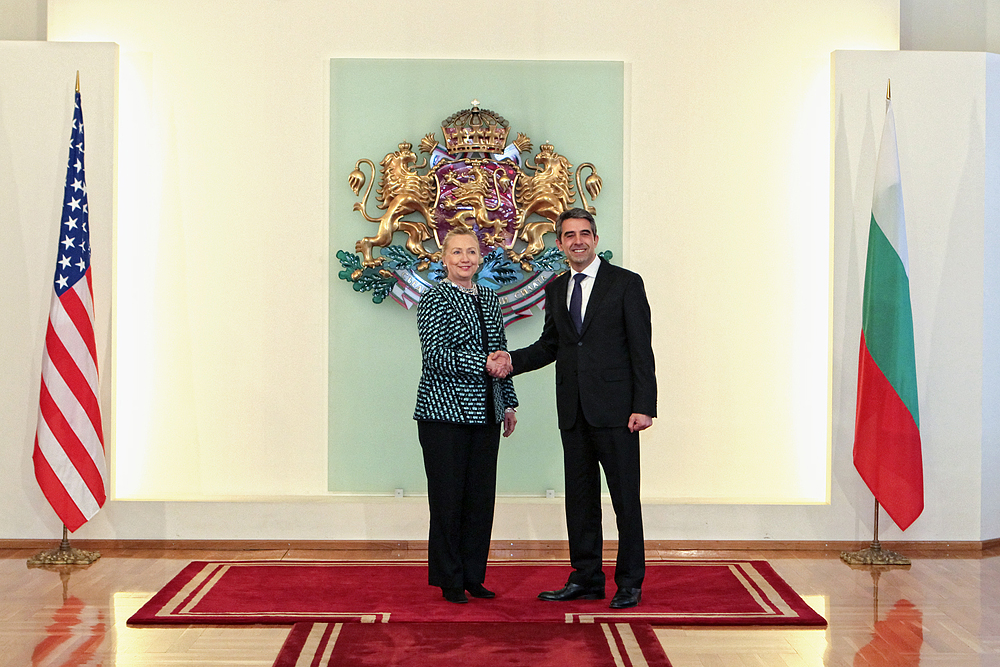
Plevneliev meets with U.S. Secretary of State Hillary Clinton in Sofia, 5 February 2012

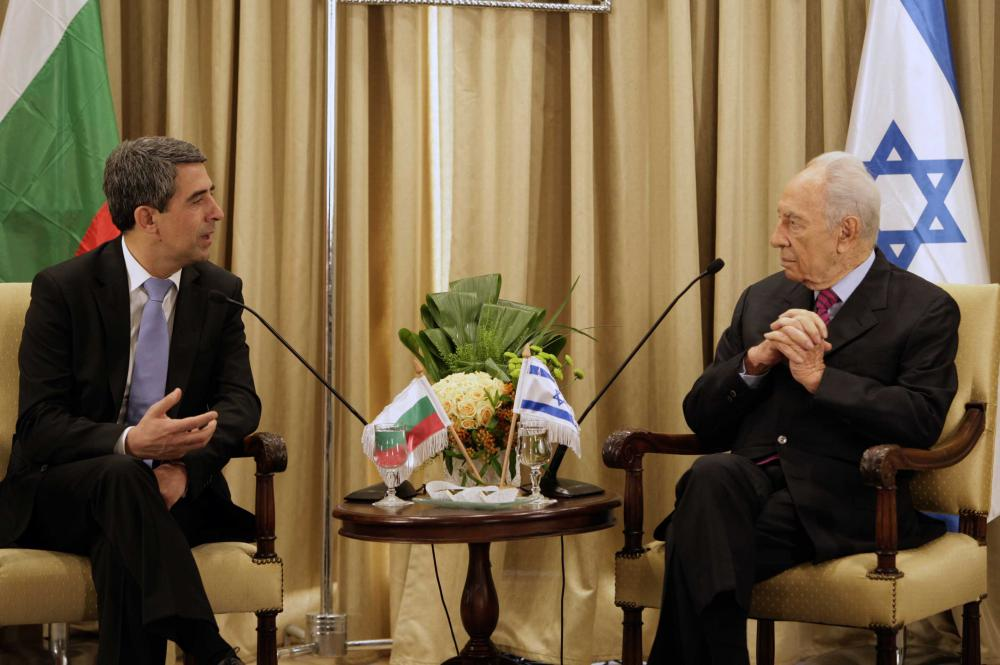
Plevneliev meets with Israeli President Shimon Peres in Jerusalem, 22 October 2012.

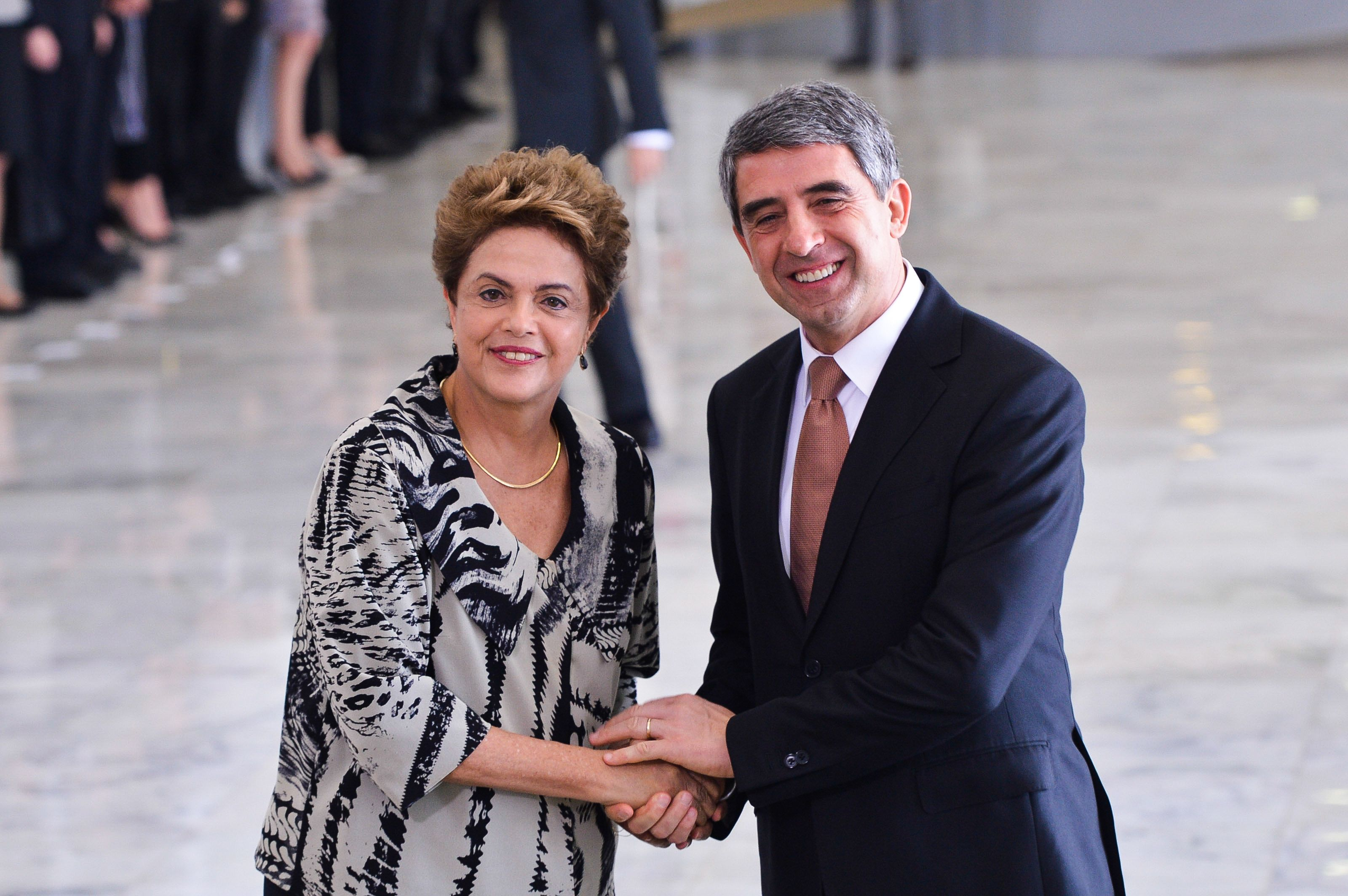
Then Brazilian President Dilma Rousseff greets Plevneliev upon his arrival to the Planalto Palace in Brasília, Brazil, 1 February 2016.

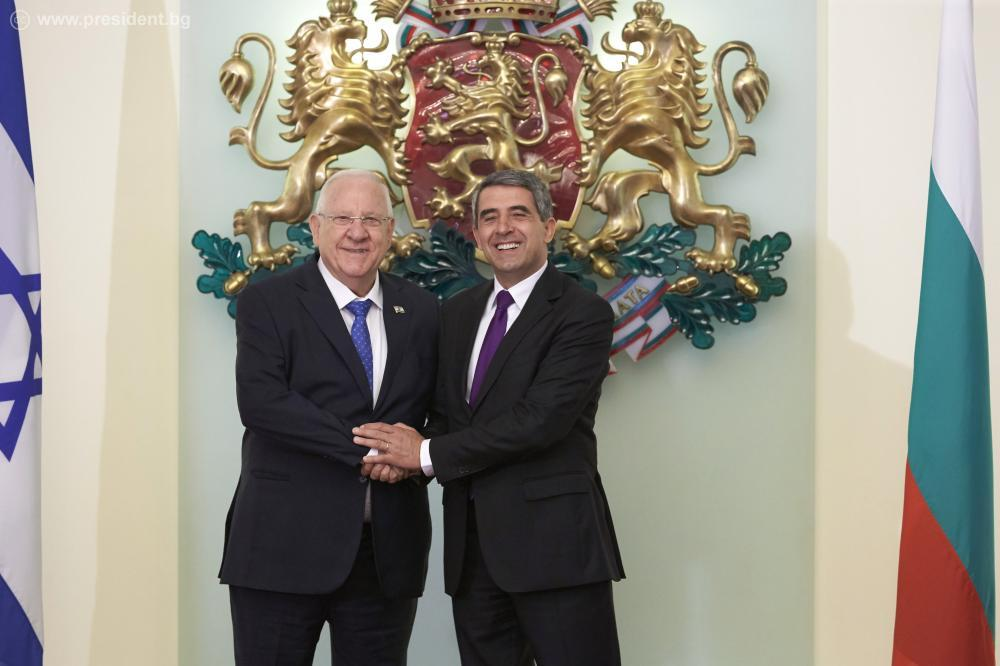
Plevneliev meets with Israeli President Reuven Rivlin in Sofia, 7 July 2016.

Plevneliev became Minister of Regional Development and Public Works under Deputy Prime Minister Simeon Djankov on 27 July 2009. Minister Plevneliev was one of a handful of "reformers" in the government, together with Deputy Prime Minister Simeon Djankov, the Minister of Economy Traicho Traikov and the Minister of Environment Nona Karadzhova.

== Presidency (2012–2017) ==
- Presidency of Rosen Plevneliev; 22 January 2012 – 22 January 2017
- Vice President: Margarita Popova
- Premier: Boyko Borisov, Marin Raykov, Plamen Oresharski, Georgi Bliznashki, Boyko Borisov
- Party: None (Was part of GERB from 2009 till 2011, was aligned with that party during his presidency)
- Election: 2011

He was announced as GERB's candidate for President of Bulgaria on 4 September 2011. He subsequently won the presidential election in a second round held on 30 October 2011, with a majority of 52.58% of the vote. He defeated Ivaylo Kalfin from the Bulgarian Socialist Party in the second round. He took the presidential oath on 19 January 2012 and officially took over from his predecessor Georgi Parvanov on 22 January 2012. Among his priorities are administrative reforms, energy efficiency and energy independence and removing of ambassadors of Bulgaria in foreign countries who have served as secret agents during the Communist regime.

As a result of the 2013 Bulgarian protests against monopoly and high electricity prices, the conservative government of Prime Minister Boyko Borisov tendered its resignation on 20 February 2013. President Plevneliev, acting in accordance with the constitution, offered a mandate to form a new government within the term of the current Parliament to GERB, BSP and DPS but after each of them declined, Plevneliev appointed a caretaker government on 13 March 2013, with Marin Raykov, the Bulgarian ambassador in Paris as Prime Minister and Minister of Foreign Affairs.

In 2013, due to the prolonged protests against the involvement of oligarchy in politics and the government, Plevneliev organised the 'Dialogue with citizens' initiative, which involved three debates, focused on market economy, the judicial system and media freedom.

Plevneliev advocates for closer relations between Bulgaria and the People's Republic of China.

Plevneliev has frequently criticized the immigration policy in the UK set by the former Prime Minister, David Cameron.

By appointing the Bliznashki Government on 6 August 2014, Plevneliev has become the first President of Bulgaria to appoint more than one caretaker government.

== Post-presidency ==
In October 2022, Rosen Plevneliev was invited by GERB to become head of a contact group for cabinet talks, formed by the party. He accepted the invitation. The contact group held meetings with all the pro-European and democratic forces within the 48th National Assembly. However the negotiations ended with no agreement reached.

A year later, in September 2023, Plevneliev along with the ex-Minister of Foreign Affairs and President of the Atlantic Club of Bulgaria Solomon Passy and a number of other opinion leaders and public figures issued a public statement, proposing that Bulgaria's EU and NATO membership be included in the Constitution of Bulgaria.

== Controversies ==
In January 2014 the tax authorities launched an investigation on President Rosen Plevneliev and his relatives. This action was perceived as politically motivated assault by the Oresharski Government. Other reformist members of the Boyko Borisov government were also subject to such investigations.

== Honours ==
=== Foreign honours ===
- Greece: Grand Collar of the Order of the Redeemer (4 July 2012)
- Poland: Order of the White Eagle (14 November 2014)
- Portugal: Grand Collar of the Order of Prince Henry (15 June 2015)
- Slovakia: Grand Cross of the Order of the White Double Cross (10 December 2015)
- Brazil: Grand Collar of the Order of the Southern Cross (1 February 2016)
- Cyprus: Grand Collar of the Order of Makarios III (22 February 2016)
- Austria: Grand Star of the Decoration of Honour for Services to the Republic of Austria (26 April 2016)
- Albania: Honor of the Nation Decoration (1 June 2016)
- Germany: Grand Cross Special Class of the Order of Merit of the Federal Republic of Germany (22 June 2016)
- Ukraine: First Class of the Order of Prince Yaroslav the Wise (29 June 2016)
- Slovenia: Order for Exceptional Merits (25 July 2016)
- Italy: Knight Grand Cross with Collar of the Order of Merit of the Italian Republic (4 August 2016)
- Croatia: Grand Cross of the Grand Order of King Tomislav (25 August 2016)
- Moldova: Order of the Republic (5 October 2016)
- Hungary: Grand Cross with Chain of the Hungarian Order of Merit (10 November 2016)
- Romania: Collar of the Order of the Star of Romania (2016)
- Malta: Companion of Honour of the National Order of Merit (17 November 2016)
- Montenegro: Grand Cross of the Order of the Republic of Montenegro (20 December 2016)
- House of Habsburg-Lorraine: Order of St. George
- France: Commander of the Legion of Honour (15 November 2018)

Political offices
| Preceded by Asen Gagauzov | Minister of Regional Development and Public Works; 2009–2011 | Succeeded by Lilyana Pavlova |
| Preceded by Georgi Parvanov | President of Bulgaria; 2012–2017 | Succeeded by Rumen Radev |
