= Georgi Bliznashki =

Bulgarian politician

- Георги Близнашки
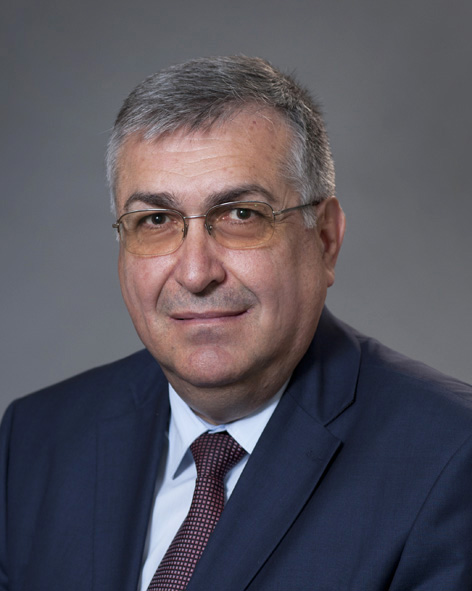
- Official portrait, 2014

Prime Minister of Bulgaria
- In office 6 August 2014 – 7 November 2014
- President: Rosen Plevneliev
- Deputy: Ekaterina Zaharieva; Hristo Ivanov; Yordan Hristoskov; Iliyana Tsanova
- Preceded by: Plamen Oresharski
- Succeeded by: Boyko Borisov

Personal details
- Born: Georgi Petkov Bliznashki; 4 October 1956 (age 69) Skravena, Sofia Province, PR Bulgaria
- Party: Independent (since 2014)
- Other political affiliations: Communist Party (until 1990); BSP (1990-2014)
- Education: Sofia University
- Occupation: Politician; lecturer

Georgi Petkov Bliznashki (Bulgarian: Георги Петков Близнашки, born 4 October 1956) is a Bulgarian politician who served as Prime Minister of Bulgaria in 2014, leading a caretaker government. A member of the Bulgarian Socialist Party, from which he was expelled in 2014, Bliznashki consecutively served as Observer and Member of the European Parliament from 2005 to 2007. He was also a Member of the National Assembly from 1991 to 1994 and from 2005 to 2009.

== Expulsion from Socialist Party ==
Bliznashki was expelled from the BSP in March 2014 after he expressed disagreement with party policy. On 6 August 2014 he was appointed to serve as a caretaker Prime Minister of Bulgaria. The Bliznashki Government ended with the election of a new government two months later.

== See also ==
- Bliznashki Government

Political offices
Preceded by Plamen Oresharski	Prime Minister of Bulgaria; 2014	Succeeded by Boyko Borisov
