= Plamen Oresharski =

Bulgarian politician

- Пламен Орешарски
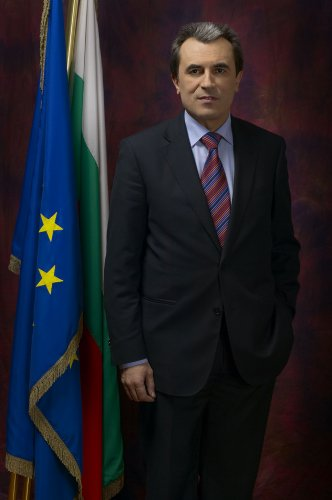
- Official portrait, 2013

Prime Minister of Bulgaria
- In office 29 May 2013 – 6 August 2014
- President: Rosen Plevneliev
- Deputy: Tsvetlin Yovchev; Daniela Bobeva; Zinaida Zlatanova
- Preceded by: Marin Raykov
- Succeeded by: Georgi Bliznashki

Member of the National Assembly
- In office 14 July 2009 – 29 May 2013
- Constituency: 2nd MMC - Burgas

Minister of Finance
- In office 17 August 2005 – 27 July 2009
- Prime Minister: Sergei Stanishev
- Preceded by: Milen Veltchev
- Succeeded by: Simeon Dyankov

Personal details
- Born: Plamen Vasilev Oresharski; 21 February 1960 (age 66) Dupnitsa, PR Bulgaria
- Party: Independent (since 2014)
- Other political affiliations: SDS (until 2003); BSP (2005-2013)
- Spouse: Elka Georgieva
- Children: 1
- Education: University of National and World Economy
- Occupation: Politician; economist; lecturer

Plamen Vasilev Oresharski (Bulgarian: Пламен Василев Орешарски, born 21 February 1960) is a Bulgarian politician who served as Prime Minister of Bulgaria from 2013 to 2014. Affiliated with the Bulgarian Socialist Party, he previously served as Member of the National Assembly from 2009 to 2013, Minister of Finance from 2005 to 2009 and Deputy Minister of Finance from 1997 to 2001.

== Early life and education ==
Oresharski was born on 21 February 1960 in Dupnitsa, Bulgaria. In addition to his native Bulgarian, he speaks English and Russian. In 1985, Oresharski graduated from the University of National and World Economy. Between 1988 and 1992, Oresharski completed a dissertation on the topic of "Investments and Investment Analysis", earning the equivalent of a doctoral degree. From 1993, Oresharski was Director of the Division for the State Treasury and Debt of the Ministry of Finance. Between 1995 and 1997, he served on the Governing Council of the Bulgarian Stock Exchange, and from 1997 to 2000 on the board of the UniCredit Bulbank.

== Political career ==
When Ivan Kostov became prime minister in 1997, Oresharski served under his administration as deputy minister of finance, a position he held until the 2001 election, when he decided to lecture at the Higher Institute of Finances and Economics. In 2003, he was nominated by the UDF as a mayoral candidate for Sofia. In the same year, Oresharski left the UDF and was for a while part of the BZNS-NS, DP and "Gergyovden" coalition. In 2004, he was a member of the group that was in charge of drafting the economic reports for president Georgi Parvanov.

=== Finance minister ===
Oresharski returned to politics in 2005 as finance minister in the Socialist-led government of Sergei Stanishev, a position he held until Boyko Borisov replaced Stanishev as prime minister in 2009.

=== MP ===
Oresharski was elected as an MP in the list of Bulgarian Socialist Party (Burgas) in 2009.

=== Prime minister ===
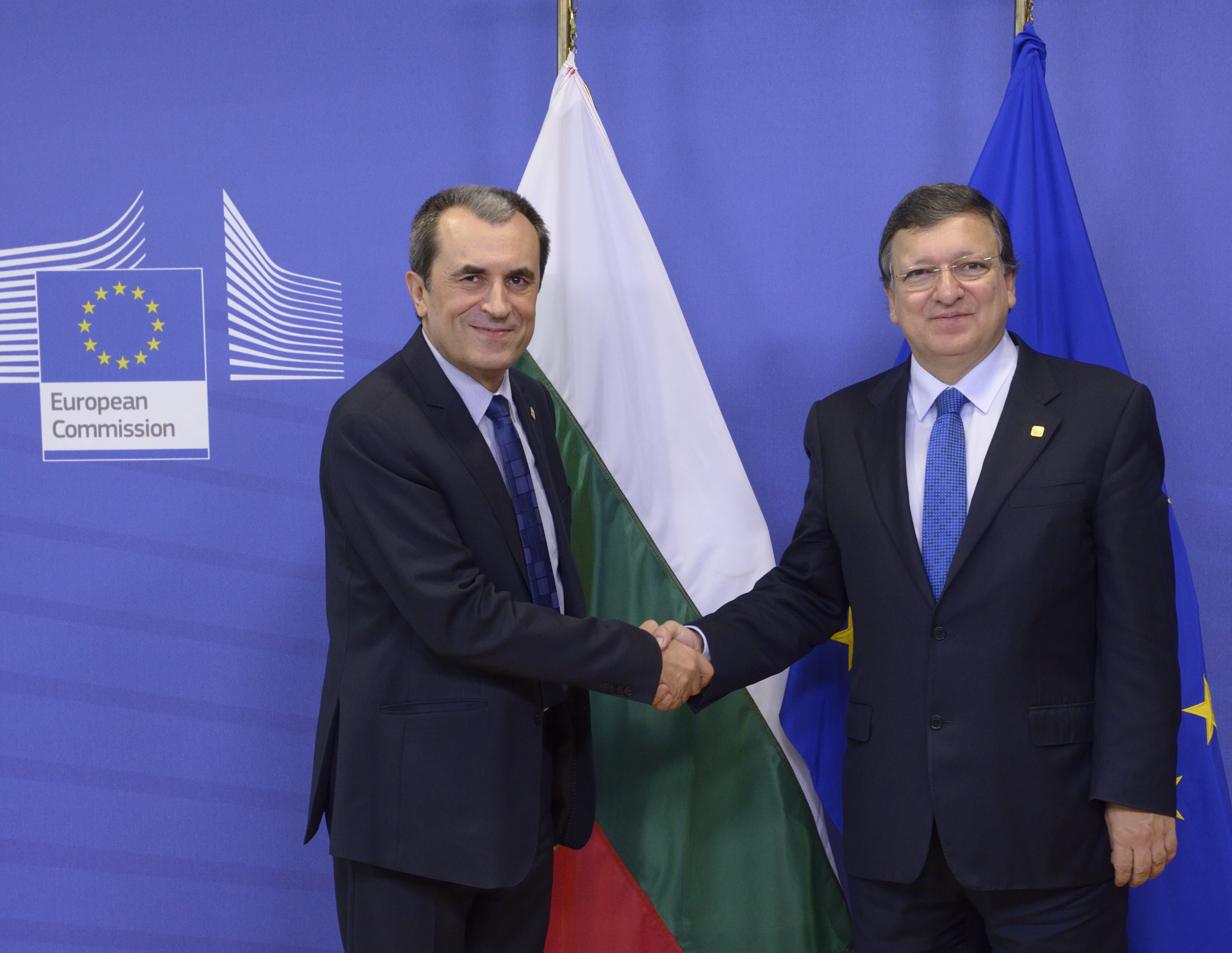
Oresharski with President of the European Commission José Manuel Barroso in Brussels, 25 October 2013

After the May 2013 parliamentary election, which was held earlier than initially expected because of the resignation of the Borisov cabinet, the latter's right-wing party, GERB, won a plurality. However, as it did not possess a majority in parliament and failed to secure backing from another party, the mandate was instead given to the second party: the Bulgarian Socialist Party (BSP). In May 2013 Oresharski was given a mandate to form a cabinet for the BSP by President Rosen Plevneliev.

Following his announcement in media of his proposed cabinet there was a strong dislike amongst some towards Oresharski and his ministers, which led to anti-Oresharski cabinet protests even before its election. Green protesters organized themselves on May 27 and protested on May 28. Nonetheless the cabinet was elected (with one change: Ivan Danov replaced Kalin Tiholov) and Oresharski became prime minister after a 120–97 vote in Parliament. Hours after the election new national protests were organized for 2 June 2013. National protesters reached thousands rallying on streets on 14 June after the appointment of Delyan Peevski, a controversial figure, media mogul and previously investigated for corruption, as head of the Bulgarian security agency (DANS). After the first day of protests against his appointment, Peevski presented his resignation, but demonstrators continued demanding the resignation of the whole cabinet. The protests, varying in size from day to day, finally ended with the resignation of the cabinet one year later.

On June 30, 2014, Bulgaria's fourth biggest bank KTB went bankrupt, amid accusations that the government had intentionally withdrawn the deposits of state-owned companies the previous weeks. The bailout would eventually cost the state budget $4 billion, and would double the public debt.

On August 4, 2014 Oresharski submitted the resignation of his cabinet, a little more than a year after his appointment as prime minister. The next day parliament voted 180-8 (8 abstained and 44 were absent) to accept the government's resignation. Oresharski on a number occasions described himself as cognizant of the need to "have his resignation in his pocket from the very beginning of his tenure as Prime Minister".

== Personal life ==
Oresharski is married to cardiologist Elka Georgieva and they have one son, Desislav. Oresharski's hobbies include mountaineering and badge collecting from various public events.

Political offices
Preceded by Milen Veltchev	Minister of Finance; 2005–2009	Succeeded by Simeon Djankov
Preceded by Marin Raykov; Acting	Prime Minister of Bulgaria; 2013–2014	Succeeded by Georgi Bliznashki; Acting
