= Prokopiev =

Prokopiev or Prokopyev (Cyrillic: Прокопиев or Прокопьев) is a Slavic masculine surname, the feminine counterpart is Prokopieva or Prokopyeva. It originates from the masculine given name Prokopy, which means successful in Greek. The surname may refer to

- Aleksandar Prokopiev (born 1953), Macedonian writer and musician
- Alexander Prokopyev (born 1986), Russian politician
- Aleksandra Prokopyeva (born 1994), Russian alpine ski racer
- Dragan Prokopiev, Bulgarian choir conductor and music pedagogue
- Ivo Prokopiev (born 1971), Bulgarian businessman
- Sergey Prokopyev (disambiguation), multiple people
- Trajko Prokopiev (1909–1979), Yugoslavian composer
- Svetlana Prokopyeva (born 1979), Russian journalist
