= Representative Ensemble of the Bulgarian Armed Forces =

Bulgarian military choir

Representative Ensemble of the Bulgarian Armed Forces Представителски ансамбъл на въоръжените сили
- Origin: Sofia, Bulgaria
- Years active: 1964–present
- Past members: Dimitar Uzunov; Nikola Nikolov

The Representative Ensemble of the Bulgarian Armed Forces (Bulgarian: Представителски ансамбъл на въоръжените сили) is a Bulgarian military choir which is subordinated to the National Guards Unit of Bulgaria. It is currently made up of 23 professional singers.

It was founded in 1944 by Dragan Prokopiev as the Ensemble of the Bulgarian People's Army. At the time, the choir recruited some of the most famous Bulgarian singers such as Dimitar Uzunov and Nikola Nikolov.

In 1962, a Pop Music ensemble was founded at the Theatre of the People's Army in Sofia, and was incorporated into the Song and Dance ensemble in 1977.

Since its creation, the ensemble has performed in Europe, Asia, South America and Africa, and has been praised everywhere for the quality of its performance. In the 2000s, the ensemble included two main quartets, Song Male Vocal Quartet and the Ladena Women's Folk Quartet. In 2009, it was renamed to the Representative Ensemble of the Armed Forces.

== Links ==
- Official Website
