= 1300th Anniversary of the Bulgarian State =

1981 national event in Bulgaria

- Date: 1981
- Also known as: 1300-та годишнина на българската държава
- Participants: Bulgarian Communist Party; Bulgarian People's Army (Bulgaria) Bulgarian diaspora

The 1300th Anniversary of the Bulgarian State was a yearlong celebration in 1981 when Bulgaria celebrated the 1300th anniversary of the establishment of the first Bulgarian state in modern history. There were 23,000 events connected with the 1300th anniversary.

== Background ==
The 1300th Anniversary of the Bulgarian State celebration was the brainchild of Lyudmila Zhivkova, and was modeled after the Millennium of the Polish State celebrations in 1966, the 2,500-year celebration of the Persian Empire in 1971, and the United States Bicentennial in 1976.

== Things made in honour of the anniversary ==
=== Monuments ===
- Monument to 1300 Years of Bulgaria, Shumen
- Monument to the Unknown Soldier, Sofia
- Buzludzha monument

=== Buildings ===
- National Palace of Culture

=== Films ===
- Aszparuh (1981)

=== Others ===
- Bulgaria 1300
- Encyclopedia Bulgaria

=== Events ===
- Bulgarian Cup

== The military parade ==
The parade took place on Sofia's September 9th Square. The parade inspector was the Minister of People's Defence of Bulgaria, General of the Army Dobri Dzhurov. The parade commander was Colonel General Hristo Dobrev, the Commander of the Land Forces of the Bulgarian People's Army. Attending the parade was the General Secretary of the Bulgarian Communist Party Todor Zhivkov.

=== Full order of the march past ===
- Drummers and Buglers of the Georgi Atanasov Military Music School
- Cadets of Military Colleges
  - Georgi Rakovski Military Academy
  - "Vasil Levski" People's Higher Combined Arms School
  - Georgi Dimitrov National Military Artillery School
  - People's Higher Naval School "Nikola Vaptsarov"
- Motor Riflemen
- BNA Airborne Troops
- BNA Marines
- Border Guards
- Militiamen of the Bulgarian Ministry of Internal Affairs

Other units present included: the National Guards Unit of Bulgaria and the Central Brass Band of the Bulgarian People's Army.

== Commemorative coins and awards ==
At least 20 commemorative coins were made in 1981 honoring the anniversary. An award, the Order "13 Centuries of Bulgaria", and a medal, Medal "1300th Anniversary of Bulgaria" were issued on October 16, 1981, in honor of the anniversary.

== See also ==
- People's Republic of Bulgaria
- History of Bulgaria
