= Bulgarian Armed Forces Day =

National holiday celebrated annually on May 6 in Bulgaria

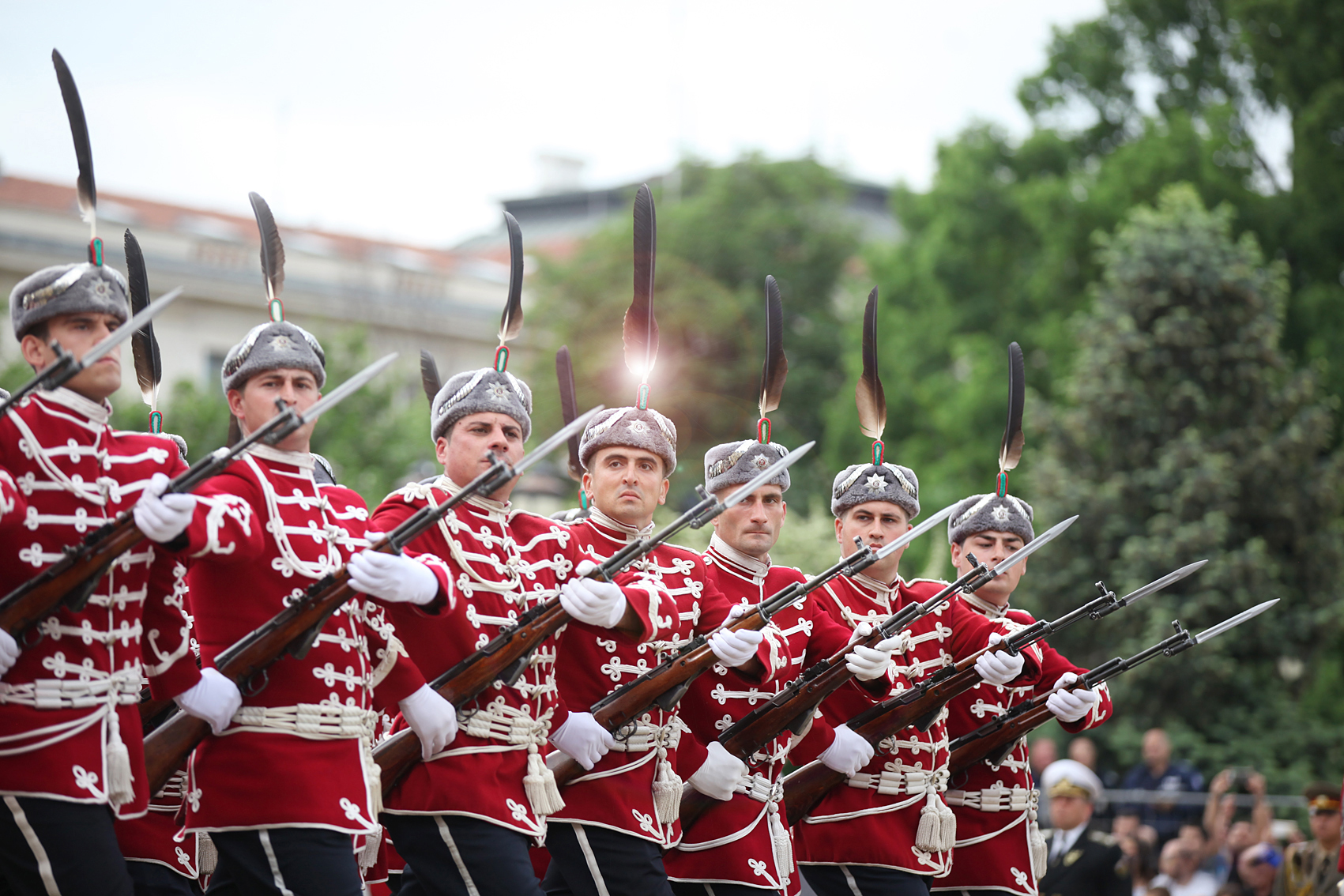
- Official name: Ден на българските въоръжени сили
- Also called: Bravery Day
- Observed by: Bulgaria
- Celebrations: Military parades, ceremonies
- Date: May 6
- Next time: 6 May 2027
- Frequency: annual

Bulgarian Armed Forces Day (Bulgarian: Ден на българските въоръжени сили), also known as the Day of Bravery (Bulgarian: Ден на храбростта) or the Day of Bravery and Holiday of the Bulgarian Army (Bulgarian: Ден на храбростта и празник на Българската армия) is a national holiday celebrated annually on May 6, commemorating the Bulgarian Armed Forces. The event is marked by military parades, fireworks and ceremonies across the country. As Armed Forces Day is the national military holiday of Bulgaria the celebrations in Sofia thus serve as a national event to mark the holiday.

== History ==
=== 19th century ===
On 22 July 1878, 12 battalions of volunteer units who had participated in war, formed the Bulgarian Armed Forces. St Georges Day was officially pronounced as the Day of the Bulgarian Army in 1880. The date was set for April 23, and from 1916, due to the transition from the Julian to the Gregorian calendar, the Bulgarian Orthodox Church decided to celebrate the holiday on May 6.

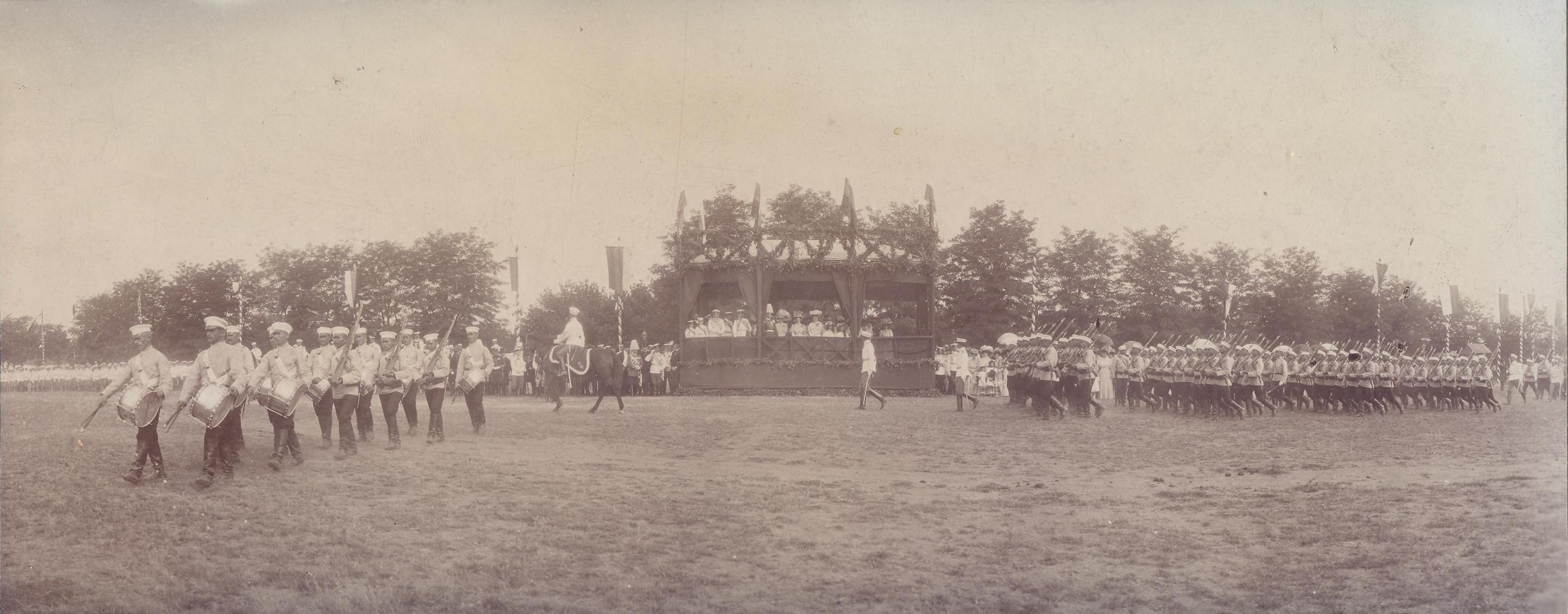
Bravery Day celebrations in 1923.

At the very beginning, the holiday was celebrated modestly, with a short review of the Tsar of Bulgaria taking place. For a long time, in parallel with the Day of Bravery, there was Victory Day, the so-called Little St. George's Day, celebrated on November 27 in honor of the Battle of Slivnitsa during the Serbo-Bulgarian War. In 1931, the Day of Bravery was declared martial celebration of the army.

=== Communist era ===
After the proclamation of the People's Republic of Bulgaria in 1946, the celebration of the holiday on 6 May was stopped. The date of 9 September became the national day of Bulgaria under communist rule (commemorating the 1944 Bulgarian coup d'état) and was adopted as a holiday of the army. A year later, the first festive military parade was held on the occasion of the holiday. In 1953, 23 September was designated as the Day of the Bulgarian People's Army. Its significance lies in it being the day of the staging of the September Uprising in 1923. Despite now having a designated army day, major military celebrations continued to take place on September 9, with the most significant military parade being held on the 1944 coup's 30th anniversary 1974 as well as the celebrations dedicated to the 1300th Anniversary of the Bulgarian State in 1981.

=== Post-1989 ===
After 1990, the seventh Grand National Assembly set August 23 as the holiday of the army, commemorating the 1877 Battle of Shipka Pass during the Russo-Turkish War. This date was changed in January 1993, when by a decree of the Council of Ministers, 6 May returned to the holiday calendar as the armed forces day.

== Notable anniversaries ==
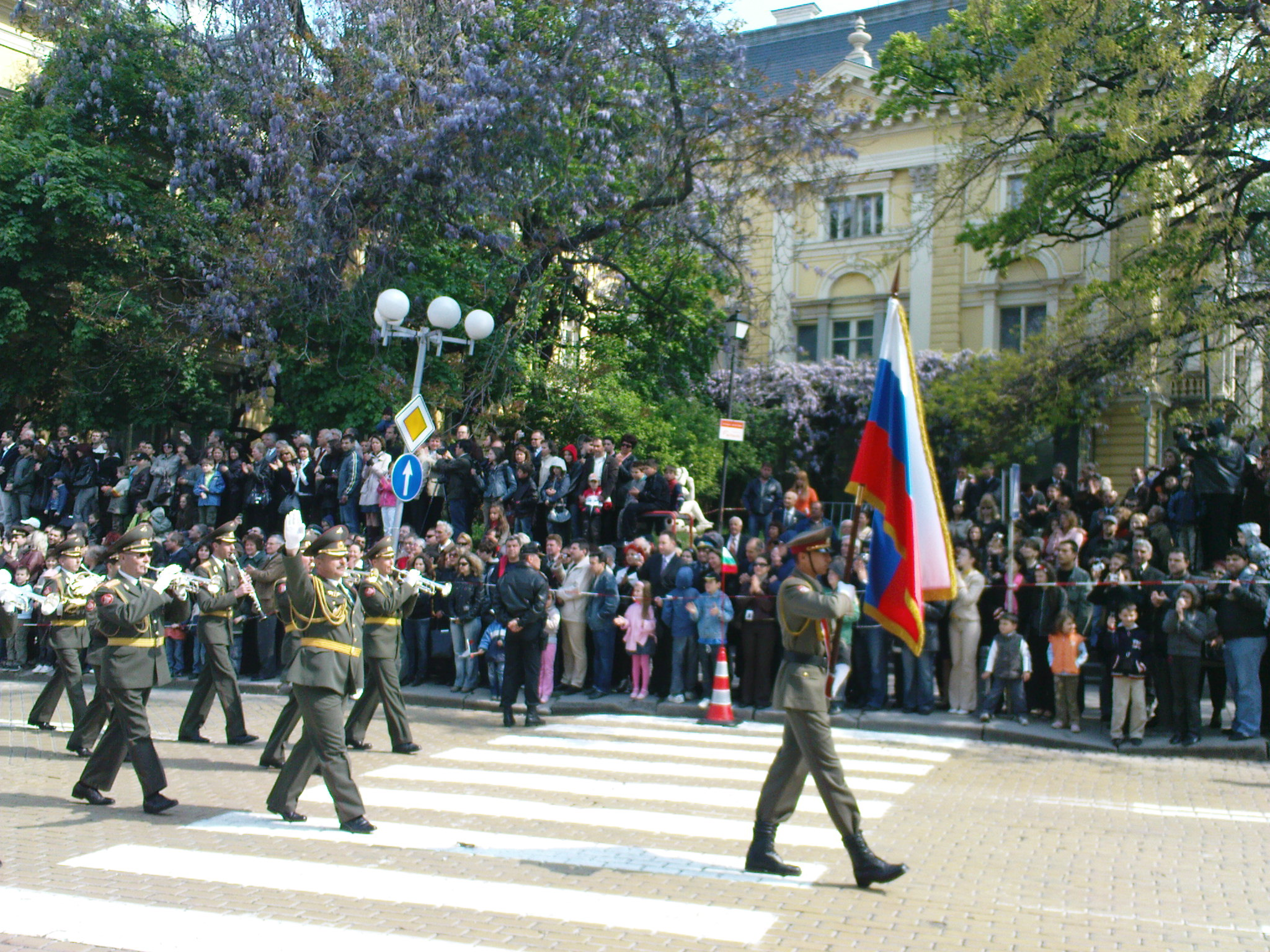
The Red Army Band marching on Prince Alexander of Battenberg Square during the parade in 2009.

=== 1937 ===
The parade in 1937 saw Tsar Boris III presented the new battle flags to the Sofia regiments, with the old battle flags being burnt and torn by bullets. The new flags were consecrated by Metropolitan Stefan I of Bulgaria and then the Tsar with a gilded hammer nailed to each of them a gilded nail with the image of his monogram.

=== 2009 ===
The celebrations marked 5 years since Bulgaria's accession to NATO in 2004 and was the largest armed forces day celebration since its revival as a national holiday in the 1990s. It also marked the first time foreign troops took part in the annual parade, with the Hellenic Naval Band, the Central Military Band of the Ministry of Defense of Russia and the United States Naval Forces Europe Band taking part in the parade.

=== 2016 ===
The celebrations were the largest since 2009, with more than 1,300 military personnel, aircraft and armoured vehicles being involved in the parade. The Bulgarian Air Force’s MiG-29 jet fighters, SU-25s, Mi-17 and Cougar helicopters and other aircraft took part in the parade.

=== 2017 ===
Three MiG-29 jets, two Cougar Helicopters and one Mi-17 helicopter parade, which was commanded by Air Force Major General Tsanko Stojkov.

=== 2018 ===
Macedonian troops took part in the festivities for the first time. This was also the first time the representative military bands of the Bulgarian Army, Air Force and Navy took part in the parade with the Representative Brass Band of the National Guards Unit of Bulgaria.

=== 2020 ===
Due to the COVID-19 pandemic in Bulgaria, the annual parade was cancelled with the Defence Minister ordering small scale celebrations at military academies instead. When questioned on this while peaking at a special sitting of the National Assembly of Bulgaria on April 28, Prime Minister Boyko Borissov confirmed this, saying: "There will be no parade. How could there be a parade on May 6? Where would people stand?" The possibility of a small demonstration by parachutists on the morning of May 6 was also looked into by the minister.

=== 2021 ===
In 2021, a parade, held in compliance with anti-pandemic measures, took place at the Monument to the Unknown Soldier near Saint Sophia Church in Sofia. A solemn consecration of the battle flags and sacred flags took place in Sofia in the presence of the Secretary General of the Holy Synod of the Bulgarian Orthodox Church. Representatives of the National Guard, the Land Forces and the Special Operations Forces took part in the ritual. In the area of the 61st Stryamska Mechanized Brigade, servicemen from the Land Forces presented combat equipment. In the Joint Command of Special Operations, over 80 servicemen demonstrated specialized wheeled and aviation equipment. They carried out elements of an operation to neutralize terrorists.

== Expanded summary of celebrations ==
=== Ceremony at the Monument of the Unknown Soldier ===
The celebrations officially begin at 9am with the laying of flowers at the Monument to the Unknown Soldier by President of Bulgaria and members of government. Here, following a flag raising ceremony, the patriarch or other representative of the high clergy of the Bulgarian Orthodox Church celebrates a memorial service for the fallen servicemen, a prayer for the living and a blessing of holy water to the colours of the Armed Forces, past and present. Wreaths and flowers are presented in memory of the fallen soldiers.

=== Military parade ===
The celebrations then continue as the parade commander (The commander is usually a Major General or Rear Admiral of the Armed Forces) arrives to take his place in the parade and receives the salutes of the Commandant, Georgi Rakovski Military Academy, reporting on the readiness of the formations at the Prince Alexander of Battenberg Square. At 10am, after a fanfare is sounded by the Guards Band of the National Guards Unit or/and the other bands within the Massed Bands of the Sofia Garrison, the President arrives and the parade commander marches towards him, informing that the parade is now ready for inspection. He then inspects the band and upon reaching the color guard of the National Guards Unit, he then pays compliments to the Flag of Bulgaria and to the massed military colours. He then inspects each of the participating parade contingents, stopping each time to greet each of the formed troops and as the inspection ends, he then approaches a makeshift saluting base at the National Art Gallery where after a fanfare has been sounded, he then makes his holiday address to the nation.

As the address concludes the parade commander shouts

To the glorious Bulgarian Armed Forces... Oorah!

While the entire parade responses with a long Oorah!, the Band then sounds the final measures of the Armed Forces Hymn Great are our Soldiers, and as the parade presents arms, Mila Rodino is then played with a 21-gun salute. The parade is then ordered to order arms and to stand at ease, and afterward the parade marches off the square in preparation for the march past as a Bulgarian Air Force helicopter commences the flypast carrying the national flag. The drummers of the massed bands beat a cadence as the parade marches off the square, reforming at its southern end for the march past to begin later on led by the parade commander.

Until 2012, the parade in Sofia passed in the direction of the Presidency to the Alexander Nevsky Cathedral near the Central Military Club, similar to the communist-era tradition. Since 2012, the parade has reversed direction and passed from the cathedral to the Presidency. Also, since 2012, the word "gentlemen" has been dropped from the official addresses of the parade, in connection with the increasing entry of women into the army and their participation in military parades.

=== Other ===
As a rule, the National History Museum, the National Military History Museum in Sofia, and the Aviation Museum near Plovdiv and others declare an open day. Photo galleries on military and military-historical themes, specialized exhibitions of historical artifacts, distribution of a military portion of food prepared from the field kitchen in real field conditions and more.

The official celebration of the holiday ends at 12 noon with the solemn change of the honor guard in front of the Presidency.

== Gallery of the celebrations ==
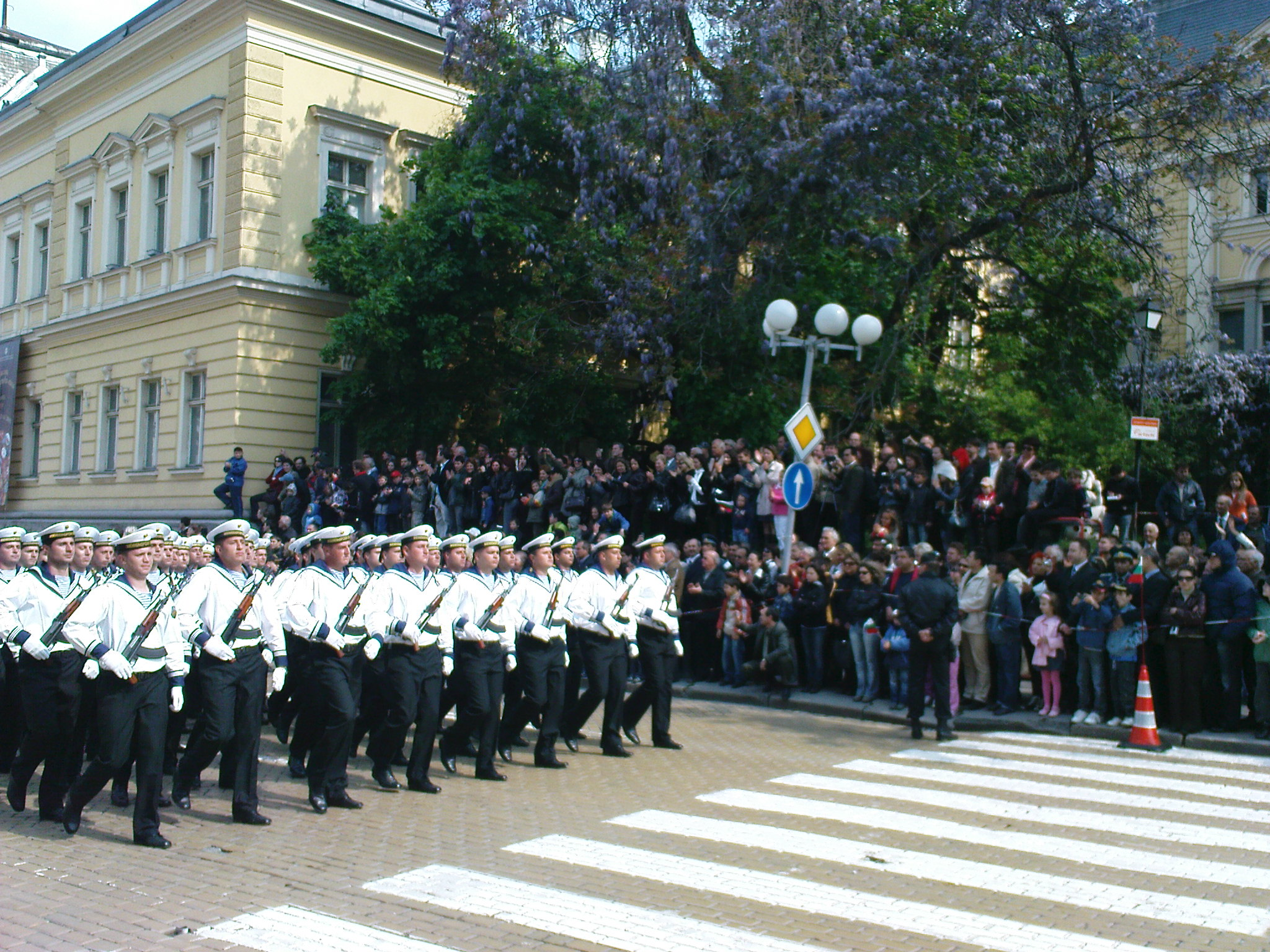
Sailors of the Bulgarian Navy

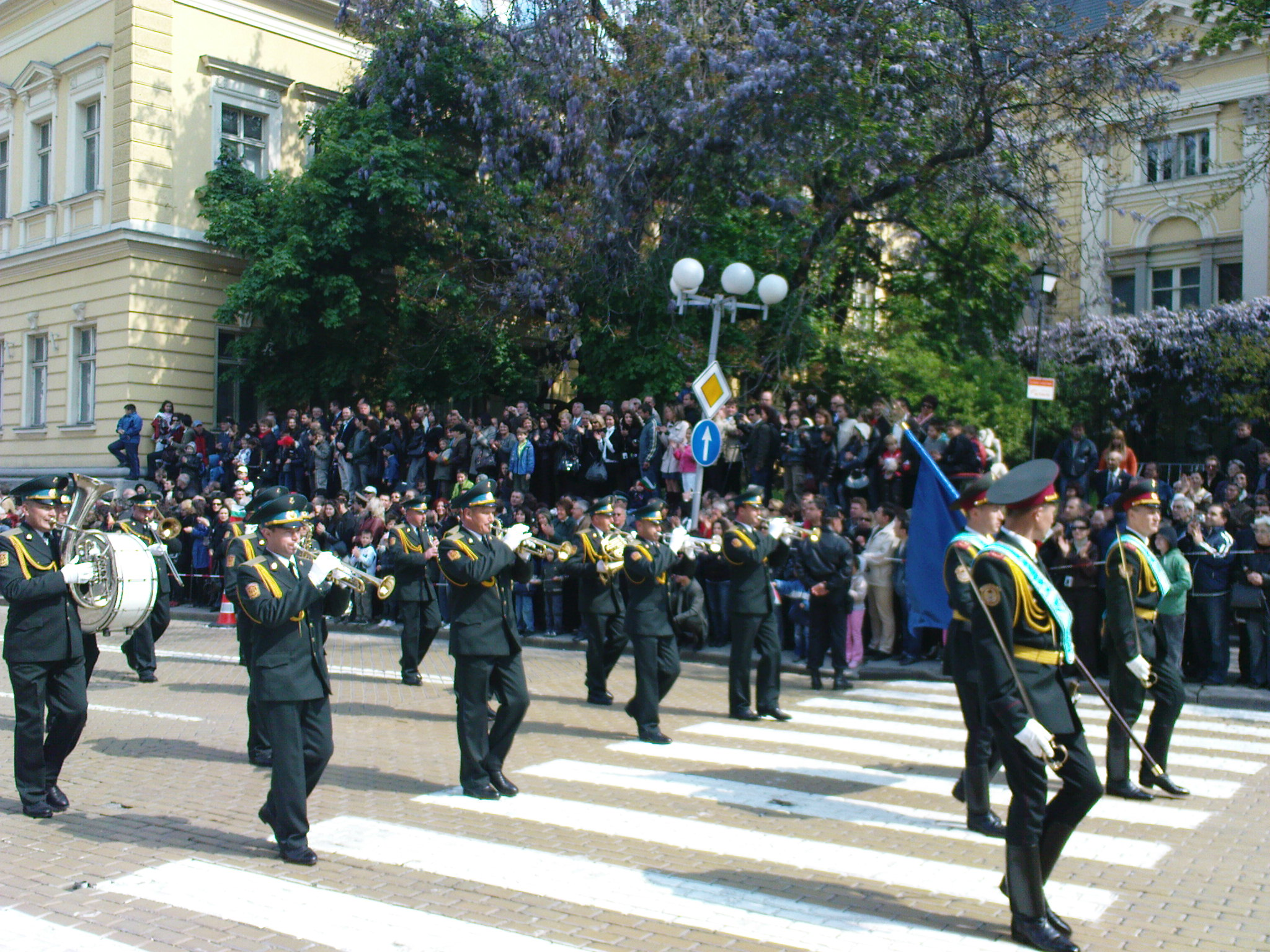
Musicians of the National Exemplary Band of the Armed Forces of Ukraine.

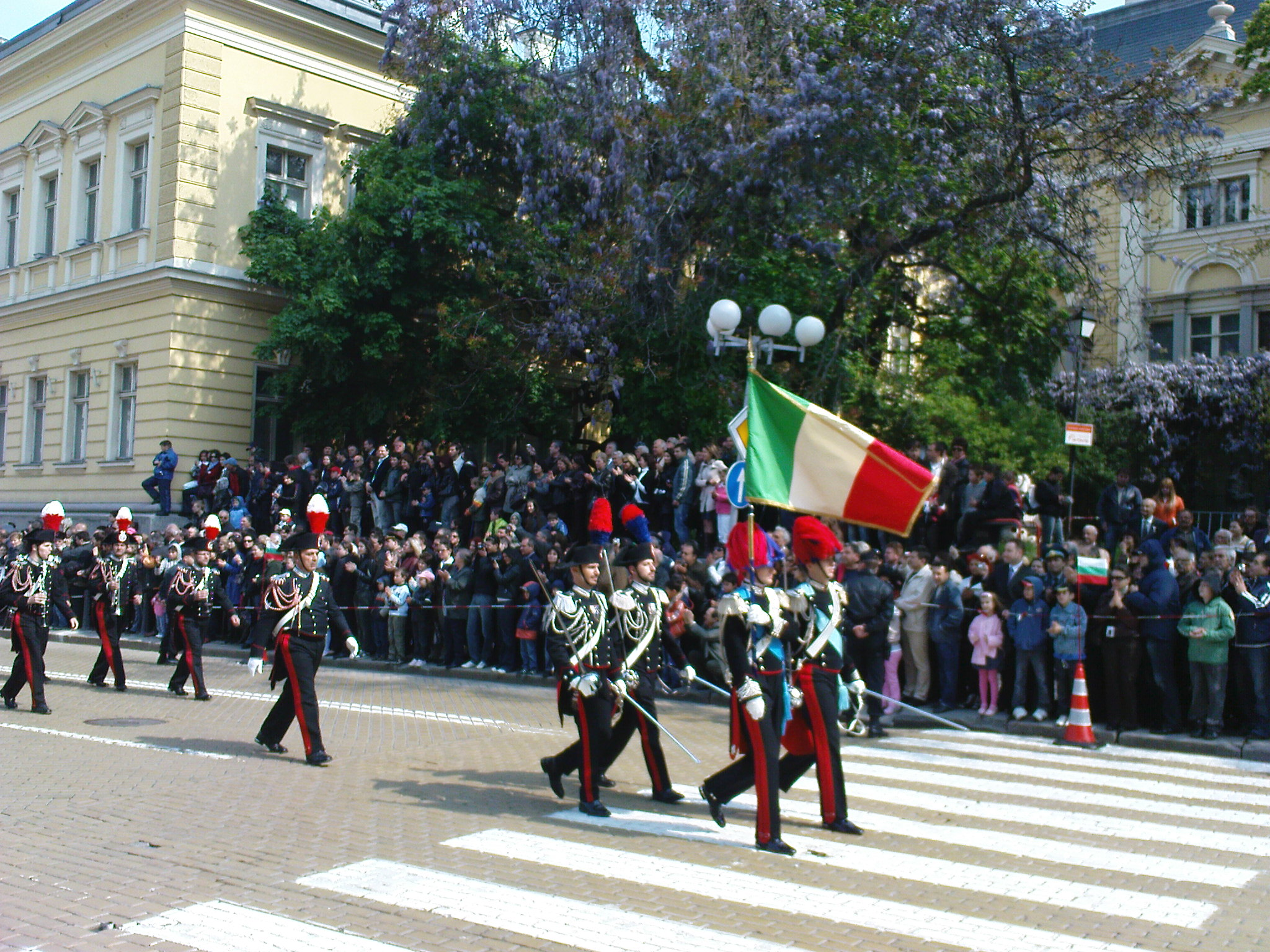
Servicemen of the Italian Carabinieri.

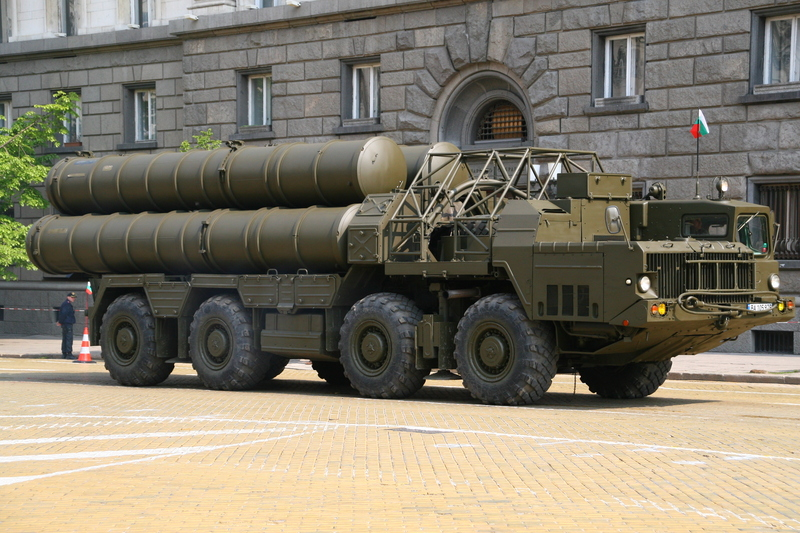
A Bulgarian S-300 missile system being displayed.

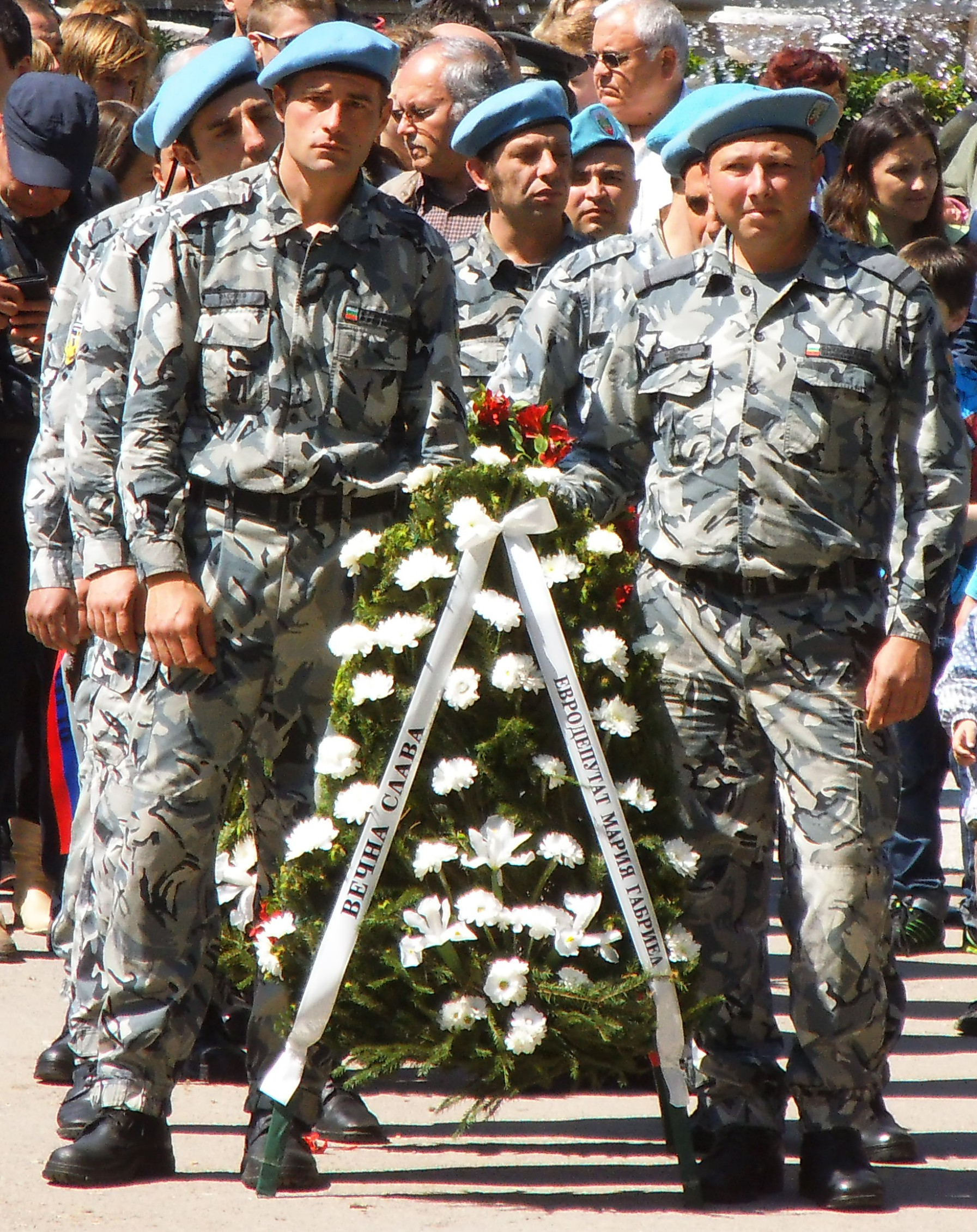
Servicemen with wreaths on the holiday.

== See also ==
- Public holidays in Bulgaria
- Bulgarian Armed Forces
- Armed Forces Day
