= Military Band of Athens =

Greek military band

The Military Band of Athens (Greek: Στρατιωτική Μουσική της Αθήνας), which is also known as the Hellenic Army Band or the Military Music Band of the Athens Guard (Greek: Στρατιωτική Μουσική της Φρουράς της Αθήνας, Α.Σ.Δ.Υ.Σ.) is the military band of the Hellenic Army. The band reports directly to the Hellenic Army General Staff. It takes part in events of national importance in Athens. The band performs at state visits, military parades and the changing of the guard at the Tomb of the Unknown Soldier.

== History ==
After the start of the Greek War of Independence, a band called the Musical Troupe (Μουσικός Θίασος) was created within the army. The troupe formed in 1824 started by French Colonel Charles Nicolas Fabvier. Based in then capital Nafplio, it was the first military band in Greek history. Its first principal musician was Ernst Michael Mangel, a German, who hailed from Württemberg. He came to Greece in 1822 and served the French Army as a captain. In 1825, Fabvier left for Athens and took the band with him. Under his command, the band took part in the Athens campaign of 1825, as well as expeditions on the islands of Euboea and Chios.

In 1828, with the arrival of the first Governor of Greece, Ioannis Kapodistrias, Mangel and the band returned to Nafplion, where the band was reconstituted and strengthened. In May 1834, the band was demobilized and led by the musician Branchel from Austria. With the transfer of the Greek capital from Nafplio to Athens in 1834, the band migrated to the new capital with K. Keller as conductor. In 1837, due to the shortage of musicians and Keller's death, the band came under the direction of Artillery Commander Franz Seiler, staffed mostly by foreigners, mainly Bavarians.

On 15 November 1843, the School of Music was founded by royal decree of King Otto to recruit Greek musicians. That same year, Mangel returned to the army ranks and was entrusted with the management of the newly established school. In 1855, Mangel became the Inspector of Military Music. In 1856 the band gained its current status as a premier military band. A Jazz Octet was raised in 2014 in time for the 190th anniversary.

== Selected performances ==
- In March 2015, as part of the celebration of the 190th anniversary of Greek military musicians, the Big Band of the Music Band under the direction of Captain Michael Hassouris held a concert at Pallini High School.
- In February 2018, the band performed at the Embassy of Russia in Athens during a Defender of the Fatherland Day event, under the direction of Major Evangelos Samaras.
- In 2018, the band hosted the Athens Military Music Festival.
- In April 2019, the band, led by Konstantinos Konstantinopoulis, took part in a concert at the National Philharmonic in Skopje in honour of the 70th anniversary of NATO. Other bands that attended included the United States Army Europe Band and Chorus, the Slovene Military Orchestra, the Band of the Ceremonial Guard Battalion and members of the Band of the Britain's Household Division.

== See also ==
- Ottoman military band
- Representative Brass Band of the National Guards Unit of Bulgaria
- Albanian Armed Forces Band
