= Prince Alexander of Battenberg Square =

Central square in Sofia, Bulgaria

Coordinates: 42°41′46″N 23°19′35″E

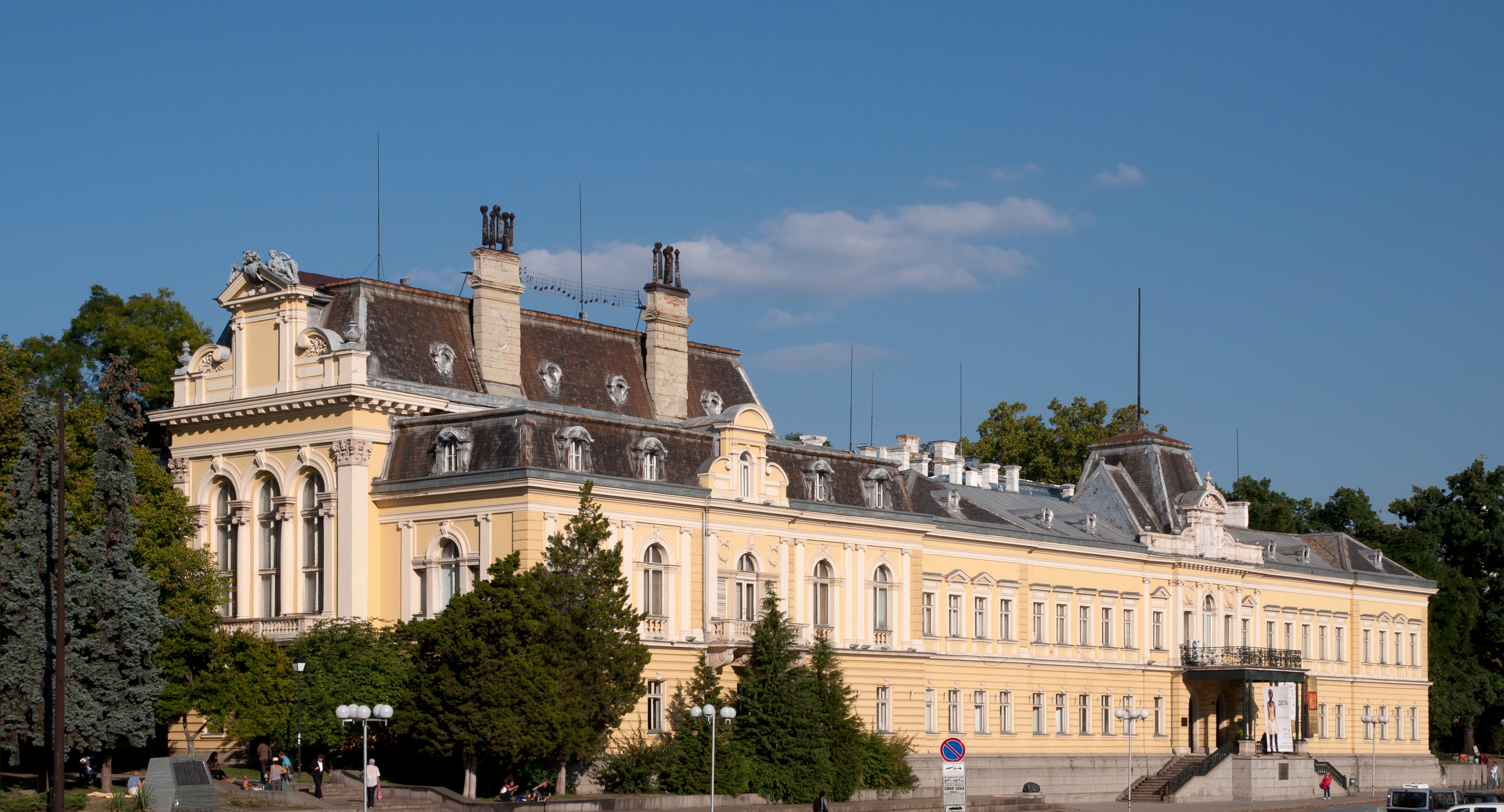
The Royal Palace, which is now being used as the National Art Gallery at Battenberg Square 1

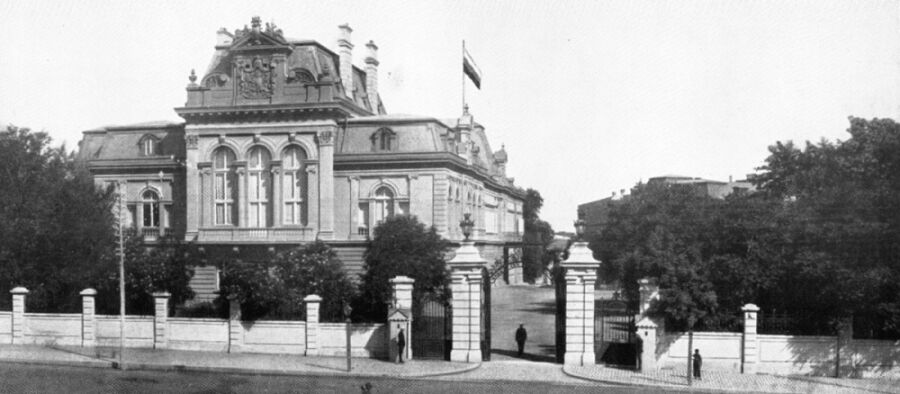
The former royal palace in 1917.

Prince Alexander I Square (Bulgarian: площад Княз Александър I, Ploshtad Knyaz Aleksandar I), often called simply Battenberg Square (площад Батенберг) is the largest square of Sofia, the capital of Bulgaria. It is named after Alexander Joseph of Battenberg (Alexander I of Bulgaria), the first prince of modern Bulgaria. During the Communist rule of Bulgaria, the square was named September 9th Square, after a coup on September 9, 1944, made the country a Communist state. Before 1944, the square was known as Tsar's Square because the former royal palace, now the National Art Gallery was located there. It was the site of the Georgi Dimitrov Mausoleum from 1949 until 1999. It is arguably the most suitable place in Sofia for major open-air concerts such as the concert series "Opera on the Square", demonstrations, parades (including the military parade on St George's Day) and other large-scale events.

== Events ==
=== Parades ===
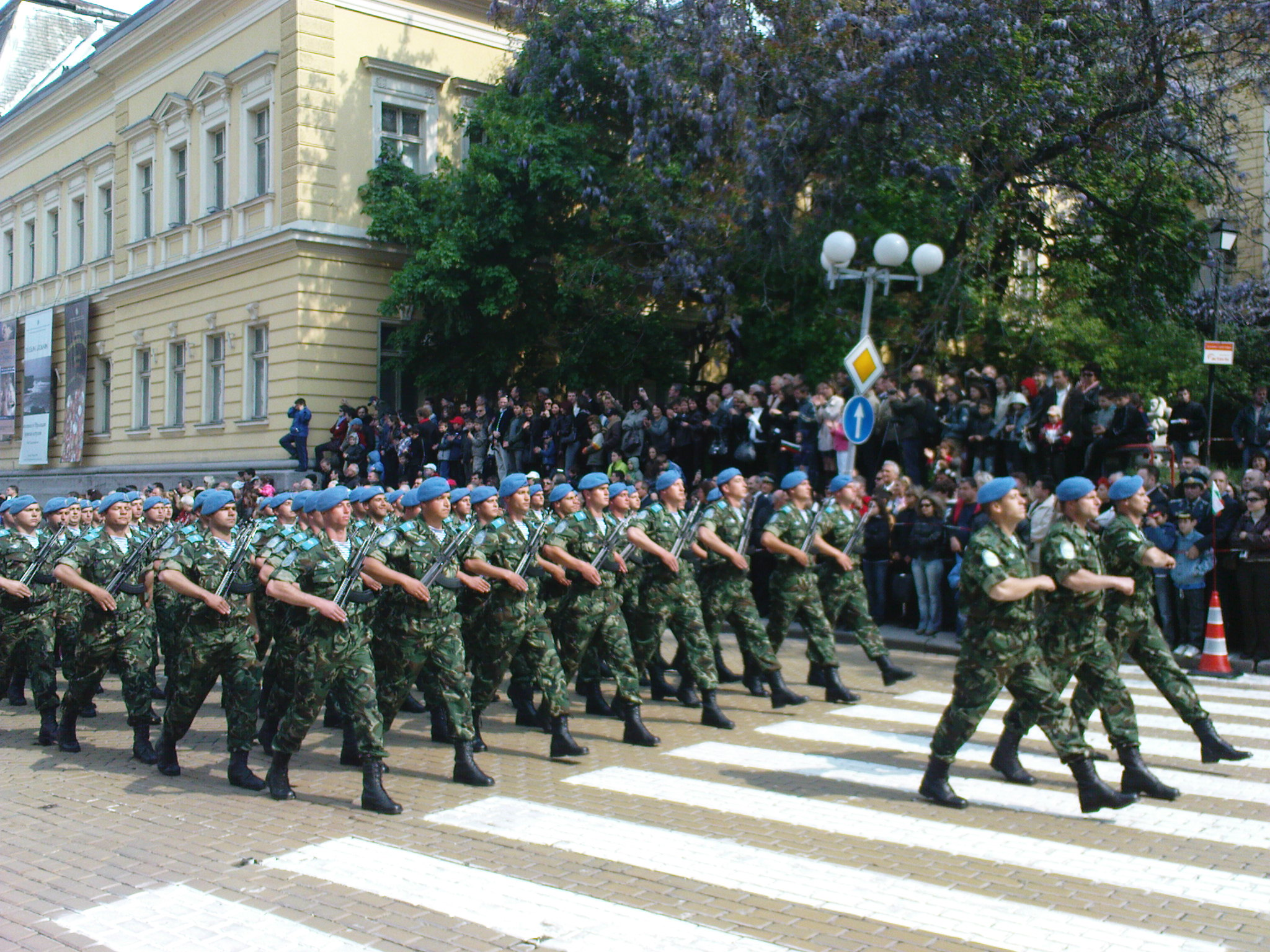
Bulgarian paratroopers marching through the square at the 2009 Bulgarian Armed Forces Day Parade.

During the communist era, September 9th Square was the main site of civil and military parades in honor of International Workers' Day, The Bulgarian coup d'état of 1944, The Great October Socialist Revolution, and in 1981 the 1300th Anniversary of the Bulgarian State. The government leaders ascended to the top of the Georgi Dimitrov Mausoleum to view these parades. After the fall of communism in 1989, parades were only held in honor of Armed Forces Day.
