= Georgi Atanasov Military Music School =

- Sofia; Bulgaria

Information
- School type: Military preparatory school
- Opened: 1971; 55 years ago
- Closed: 2001; 25 years ago
- Grades: 9 to 12
- Affiliation: Bulgarian People's Army

The Georgi Atanasov Military Sergeant's Music School (Bulgarian: Средно сержантско военно музикално училище) was until 2001, an institution of the Bulgarian People's Army and the Bulgarian Armed Forces for military musicians. It created military music and performing staff for the brass bands of the military. It was named after Georgi Atanasov Bulgarian composer from Plovdiv.

== Overview ==
It was established by ministerial order of the Minister of National Defense Dobri Dzhurov on July 31, 1971. It was the successor of the previous Tchaikovsky School. It was created for the purpose of training "highly qualified and ideologically hardened music performers" for the needs of the brass bands of the Bulgarian People's Army. The co-founder of the school was Bulgarian music pedagogue Dobrin Ivanov. Admission to the school was carried out after the 8th grade, and the term of study was 4 years. The training was carried out according to the program of other secondary music schools, as well as military band disciplines, which was recognized as regular military service. In 2001 the school was awarded the Golden Lyre Prize of the Union of Musicians for Pedagogical Achievements. The school was closed in 2001. According to Dnevnik, it was closed for financial reasons.

To this day a large part of the musicians of the Representative Guards Brass Band are graduates of this school.

== See also ==
- Moscow Military Music College
- Military Music College of Mongolia
