= National Guards Unit of Bulgaria =

National Guards Unit
- Национална гвардейска част на България
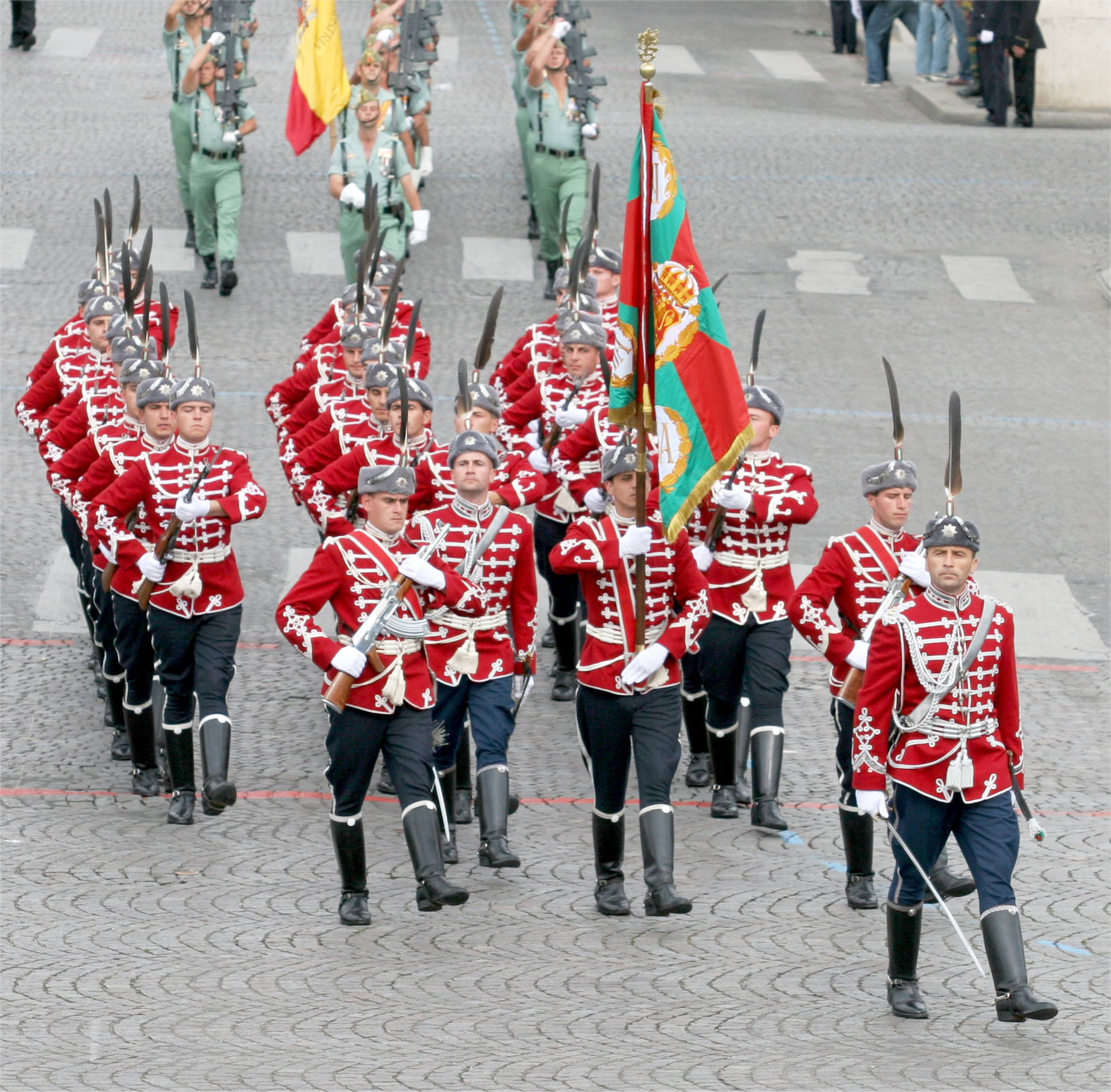
- Bastille Day Military Parade 2007 in Paris
- Active: 1879–present
- Country: Bulgaria
- Branch: Bulgarian Land Forces
- Type: Honor Guard
- Size: 315
- Garrison/HQ: Sofia
- Patron: Saint George

Insignia
- Alexander star

The National Guards Unit of Bulgaria (Bulgarian: Национална гвардейска част на България, romanized: Nacionalna gvardeiska chast na Bulgariya) is a unique Bulgarian military formation of regimental size, directly subordinated to the Minister of Defence. The unit is purely ceremonial, as the security of the President of Bulgaria, members of the government, of the Parliament and foreign dignitaries on official visits is provided by the National Security Service. It is legally a part of the Bulgarian Armed Forces outside of the jurisdiction of the Defence Staff.

== Present day duties ==
The mission of the National Guards Unit is not just to display military traditions and rituals but also to provide a center for their revival and enrichment in order to preserve and enhance the national identity of the Republic of Bulgaria and of its Armed Forces. Today it includes military units for state and military ceremonies and a full military band. The National Guard performed the ritual "Ceremonial changing of the honor guard of the Presidency" for the first time on 5 November 2003 and every hour changes guard at the administrative building of the President of the Republic of Bulgaria. The Guard also ensures the security of civil, military and industrial sites in Sofia.

The scarlet full dress uniform of the modern Guards is essentially the same as that worn under both the monarchy and the communist regime. It is modelled on historic hussar dress.

== History ==
=== 19th century ===
The National Guards Unit of Bulgaria is the successor of the Personal Cavalry Convoy (squadron) of knyaz Alexander I, founded in 1879, when on July 12 the guards escorted the Bulgarian knyaz for the first time. Accordingly, 12 July is the official holiday of the modern National Guard Unit. On August 30, 1881, after the presentation of the first official battle flags in Bulgarian history, the Guards performed a ceremonial march in front of the prince. Immediately after the proclamation of the unification of Bulgaria with Eastern Rumelia, the guards arrived in Plovdiv.

=== Early 20th century and World War Two ===
During the Balkan Wars, the Life Guards Regiment performed important tasks in the field of intelligence and the protection of strategic sites. In the critical battles for the capture of the Edirne fortress on March 13, 1913, the guards were the first to enter the city, capturing the commander of the fortress Mehmed Şükrü Pasha and his staff. During the First World War, the Life Guards Cavalry Regiment initially participated on the Southern Front and guarded the western border. From January 1916 it was included in the cavalry division with Commander General Ivan Kolev and fought heroically on the Dobruja front.

In November 1938, a guard company led by the Minister of War, General Teodosi Daskalov, attended the funeral ceremony of Turkish leader Mustafa Kemal Atatürk. The Guards Cavalry Regiment was among the first Bulgarian troops to be met in Macedonia in April 1941. In the autumn of 1944, the Guards Cavalry Division took part in the final stage of the war against Nazi Germany.

=== Communist era ===
From the 1950s to the 1990s, the Guards underwent various reorganizations and had different commands from the Bulgarian People's Army and the Ministry of the Interior. The guards also formerly performed guard duties at the now destroyed Georgi Dimitrov Mausoleum. It was known as Post №1. On Sundays, Wednesdays, and on solemn occasions, the guard was mounted at the mausoleum. The soldiers were selected from the entire army as well as the Internal Troops of the Ministry of Interior. There were no cartridges in the rifles while on duty, as police were always on duty in the area.

=== Modern republic ===
In 2001 the National Guards Unit was declared the official military unit representing the Armed Forces of Bulgaria and one of the symbols of modern state authority along with the flag, the coat of arms and the national anthem.

In 2003, on the eve of 6 May or St George's Day and Bulgarian Armed Forces Day - the biggest Bulgarian military holiday, the Bulgarians saw for the first time the solemn show-ceremony "Iskra" ("Sparkle"). This performance is combination of spectacular demonstration of non-standard combatant positions, movement with and without weapon and saluting battle flags and the heroes, who gave their lives for the freedom and independence of Bulgaria. The ritual "Solemn changing of the sentry of honour in front of the Presidency" first took place on November 5, 2003. In 2012, Gergana Ivanova was accepted into the ranks of the Guards, becoming the first female guard in the unit.

== Organization ==
Regimental Headquarters

- 1st Guard Battalion
- 2nd Guards mixed battalion
- Representative Brass Band
- Representative Ensemble
- Training Center

== Particularities ==
=== Symbols ===
The National Guards Unit has its own regimental colour, seal, distinctive insignia and full dress uniform. The scarlet Guards' uniform was created in 1883 and includes elements of Bulgarian national traditions and symbols. It has remained essentially unchanged throughout the political changes of the last 130 years. The current insignia was introduced in 2002 and consists of Alexander star, which is part of the royal medal "St. Alexander" and is worn on the Guard's hat since 1883. It is placed over a shield in colours of the Flag of Bulgaria. The current regimental colour, which follows the pattern of the traditional Bulgarian military colours during the royal period, dates from July 12, 2003.

=== Uniform ===
The scarlet hussar style uniform of the Guards was established in 1883 and includes elements of national symbolism. Throughout political changes, uniform details such as the eagle feather on the cap and the Alexander star have been retained. The Alexander star was originally a feature of the Bulgarian royal order "St. Alexander".

=== Weapons ===
Throughout the years the structure of the guards has changed from convoy to squadron, regiment and after 1942 - division. The guardsmen have however changed their weapons from cavalry sabres to infantry rifles. The standard-issue rifle of the unit is SKS (Samozariadnaia karabina Simonova) and a ceremonial version of the AK-47 assault rifle. They also use the much heavier rifle Mosin–Nagant for training.

== Commanders ==
The following have served as unit commanders:

- Captain Alexander Mosolov (1879-1883)
- Dimitri Riesenkampf (1883-1884)
- Captain Yuri von Kube (1884-1884)
- Colonel Baron Alfred Corwin (1884-1885)
- Captain Todor Kabakchiev (1885-1886)
- Captain Vladimir Tsankov (1886-1886)
- Major General Petar Markov (1886-1908)
- Colonel Ivan Kolev (1908-1912)
- Colonel Genko Markholev (1912-1913)
- Paun Bananas (1913-1916)
- Colonel Alexander Kisov (1916-1918)
- Sub-lieutenant Lubomir Bosilkov (1918-1920)
- Colonel Nikola Stanimirov (1921-1923)
- Colonel Malcho Malchev (1930-1934)
- Colonel Konstantin Markov (1934)
- Colonel Matei Zlatoustov (1935-1936)
- Colonel Iliya Dobrev (1941)
- Sub-lieutenant Ivan Bozhinov (1941-1944)
- Sub-lieutenant Ivan Sandev (1944)
- Colonel Ivan Todorov (1945)
- Colonel Tseno Tsenov (1946-1947)
- Sub-lieutenant Ivan Chepishev (1948)
- Sub-lieutenant Krastyu Antonov (1948)
- Colonel Atanas Timnev (1950-1954)
- Captain Kostadin Pandev (1967-1970)
- Colonel Nikolai Nikolov (1978-1983)
- Colonel Atanas Assenov (1982-1985)
- Colonel Angel Stoyanov (1997-2002)
- Colonel Krum Alexandrov (2002-June 1, 2008)
- Brigadier General Boyan Stavrev (June 1, 2008 – December 12, 2016)
- Brigadier General Ilko Yordanov (December 12, 2016 – April 14, 2019)
- Colonel Kancho Ivanov (since April 14, 2019 - August 08,2025)
- Colonel Petar Kindalov (since August 08,2025)

== Gallery ==
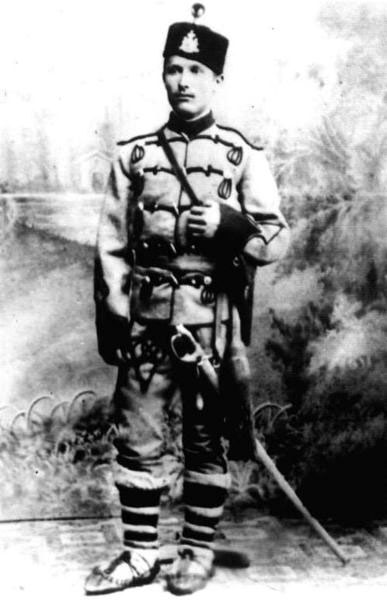
G. Obretenov with typical 19th century Bulgarian revolutionary uniform, prototype of the National Guards' uniform, c. 1876

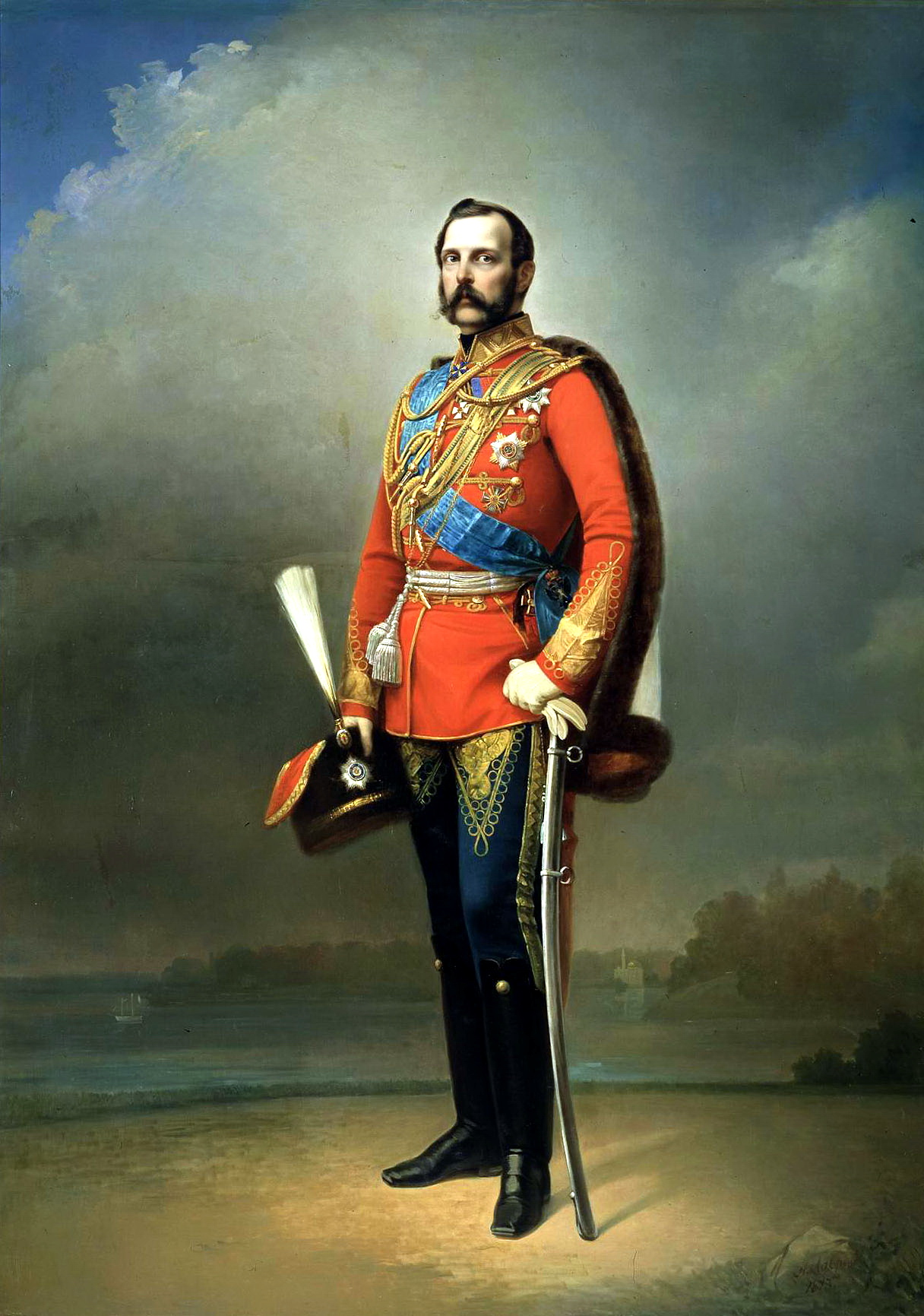
Alexander II of Russia in dolman of His Majesty's Life-Guards Hussar Regiment, 1873

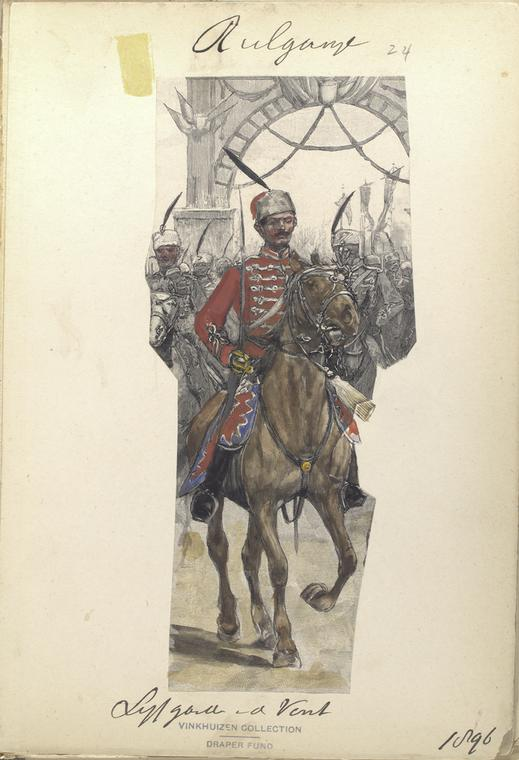
Bulgarian Life Guards Cavalry Squadron, c. 1896

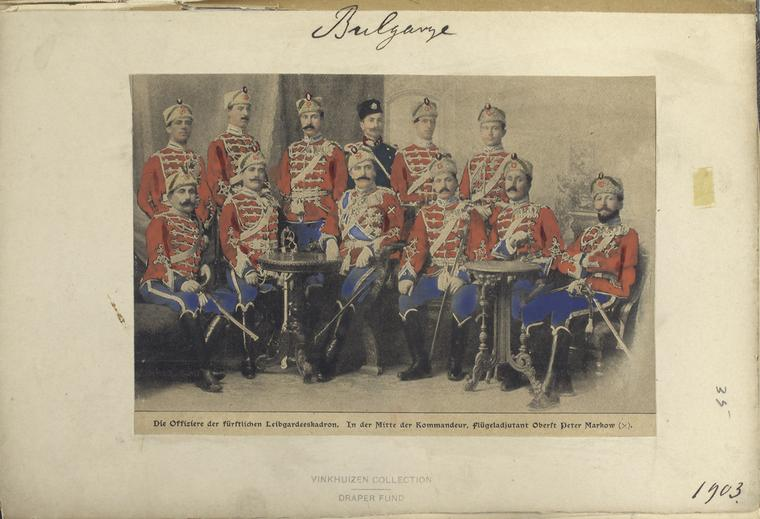
Officers of Bulgarian Life Guards Squadron, 1903

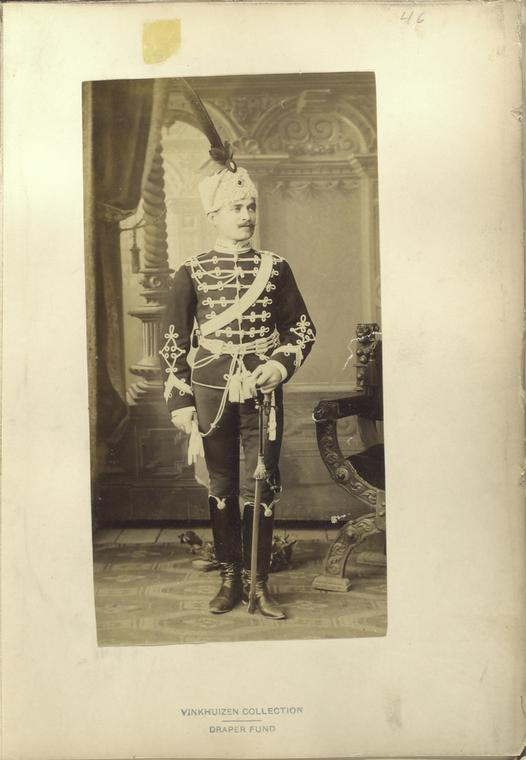
Officer of Bulgarian Life Guards Cavalry Squadron, c. 1908

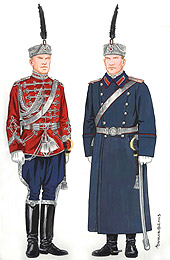
Officer's Uniform

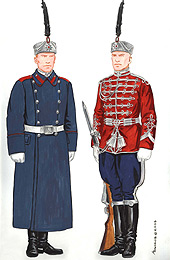
Serviceman's Uniform

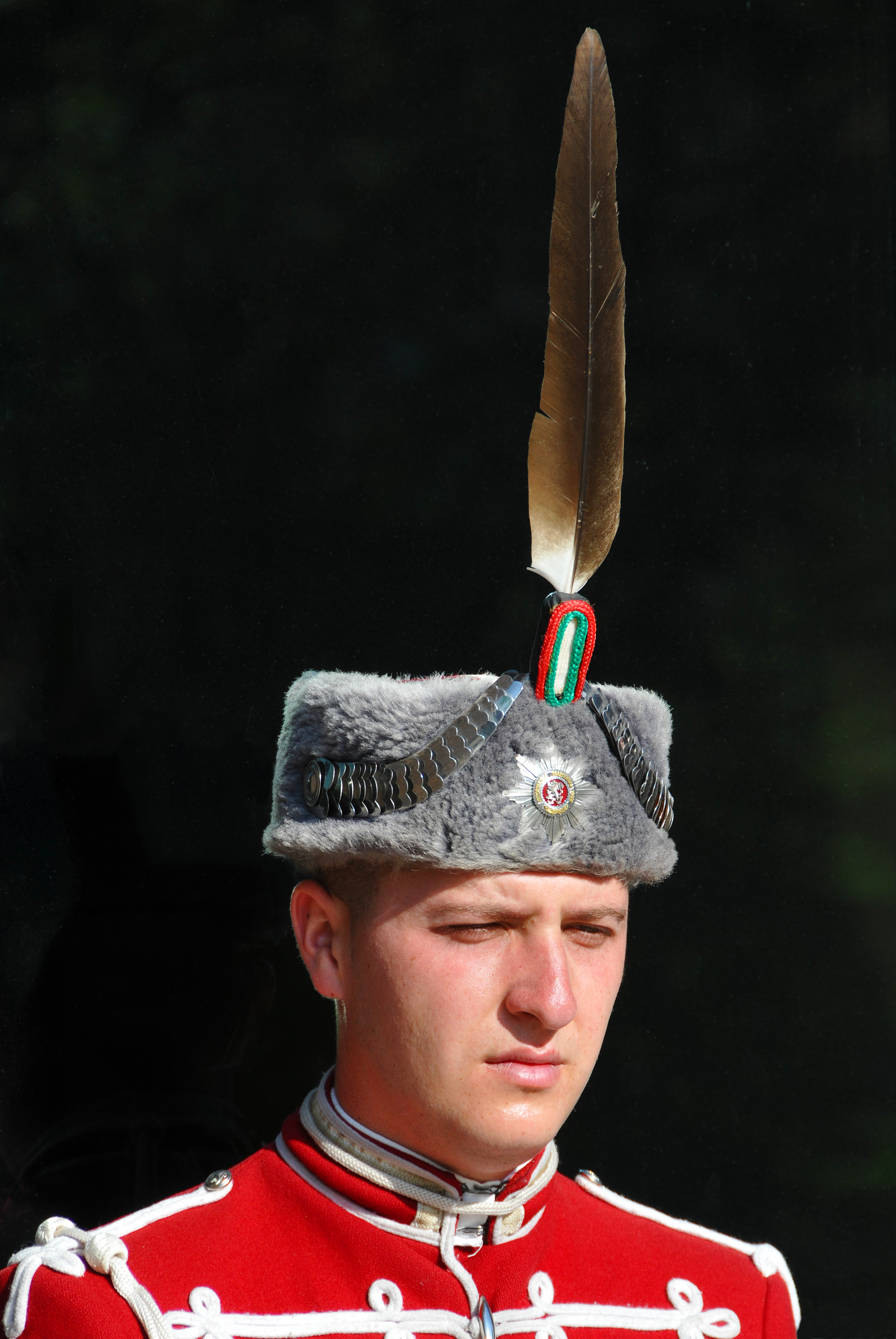
Headgear: kalpak with eagle feather and Alexander star

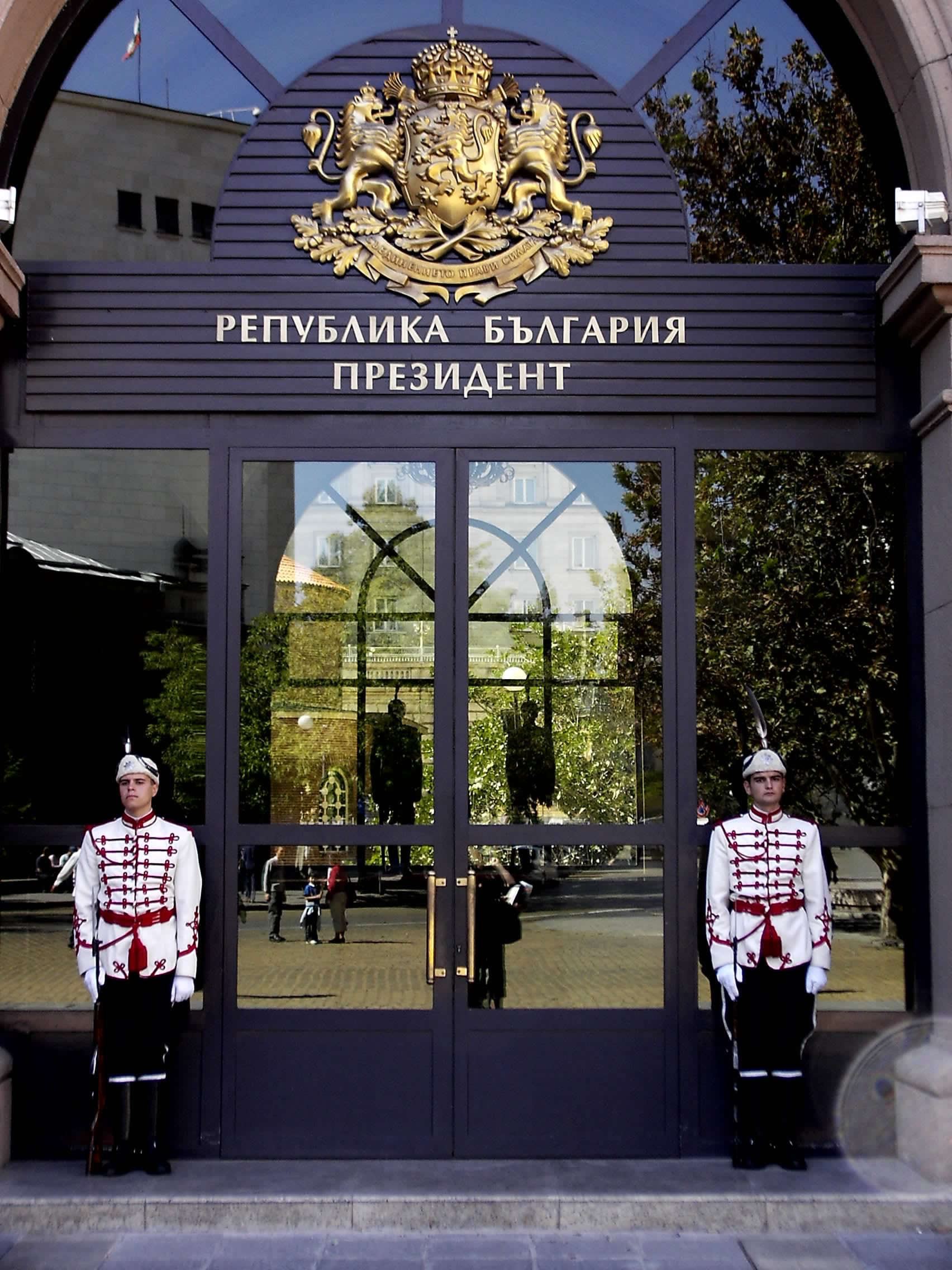
Summer uniforms

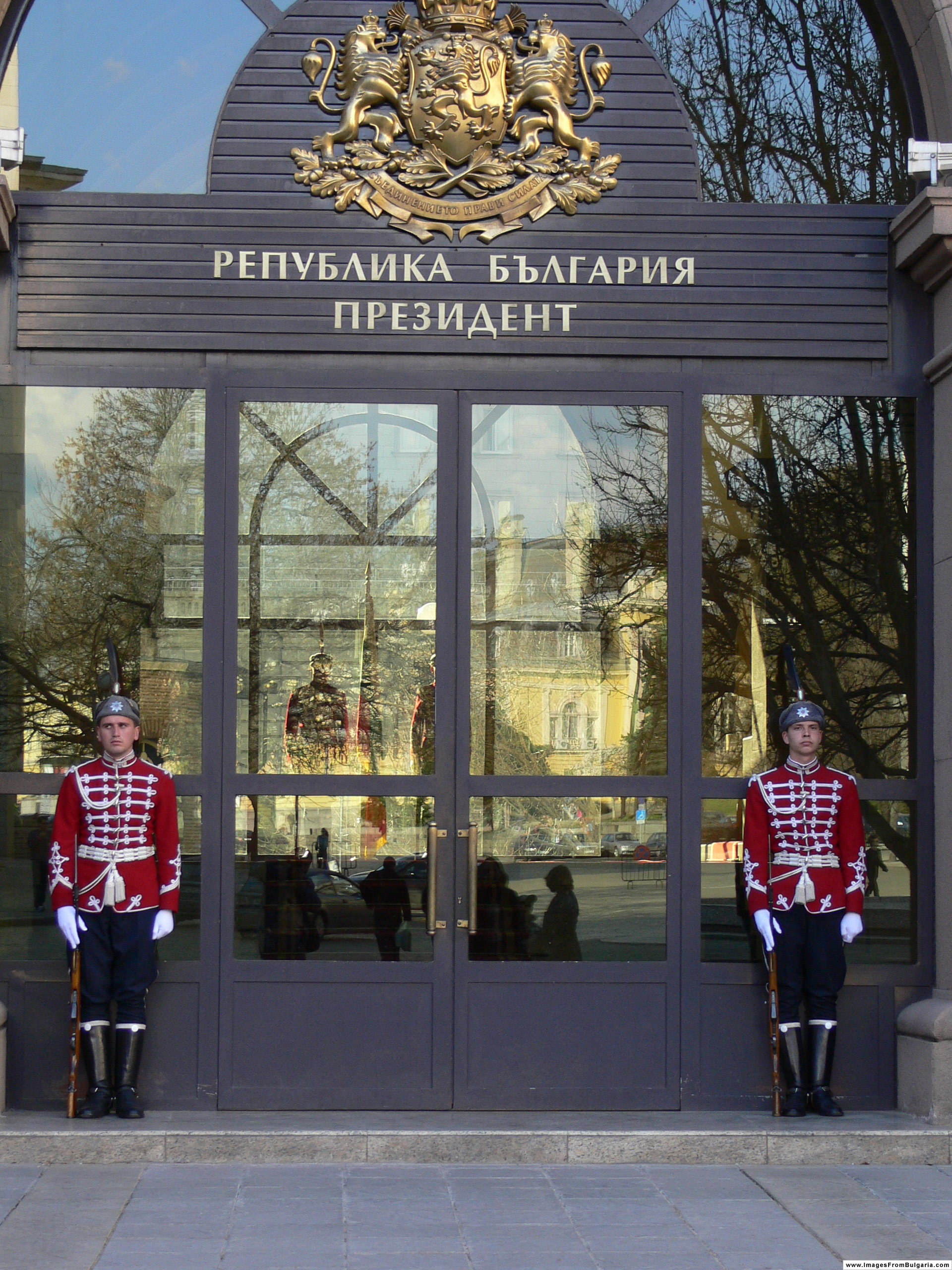
Winter uniforms

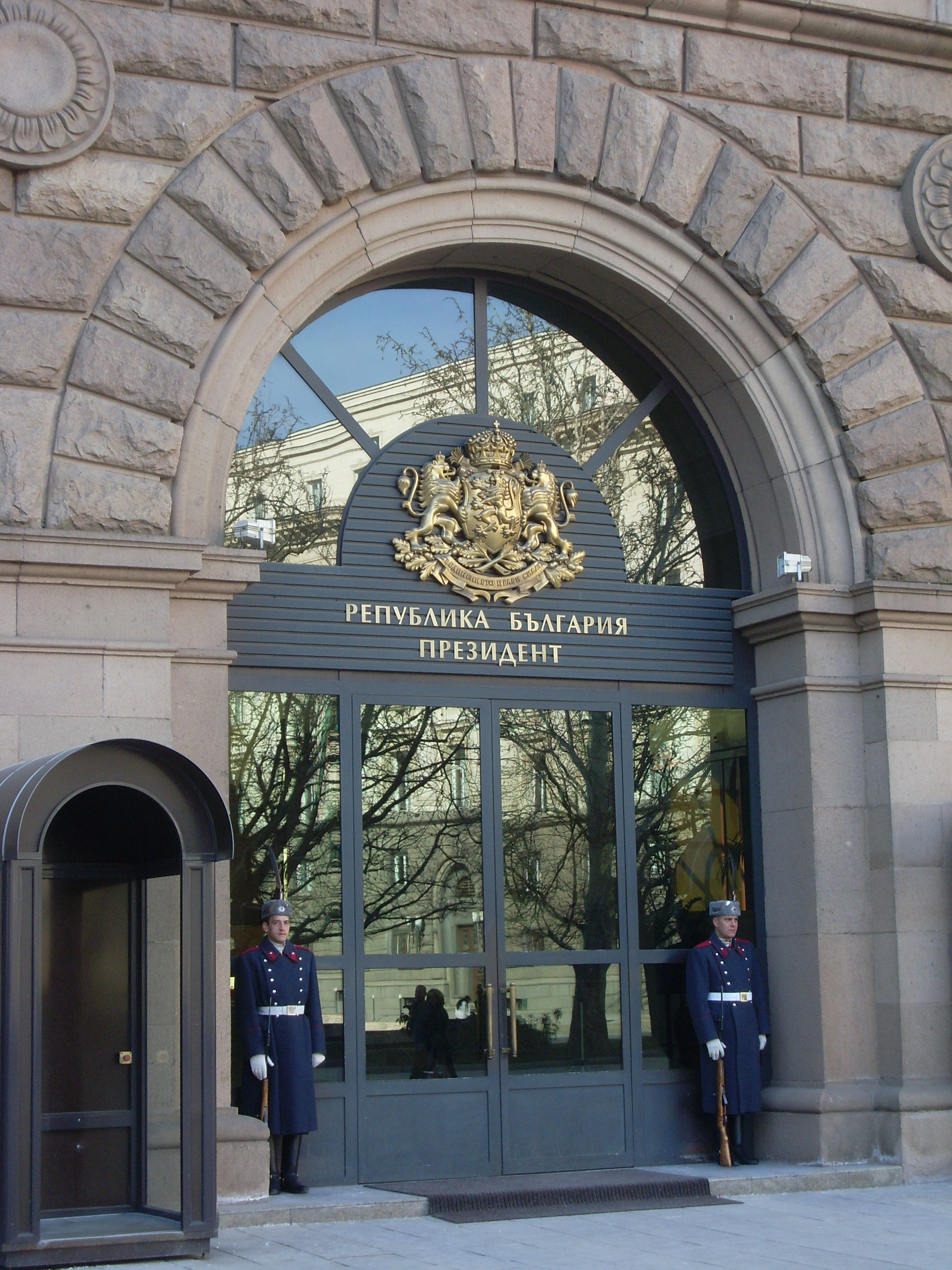
Winter greatcoats

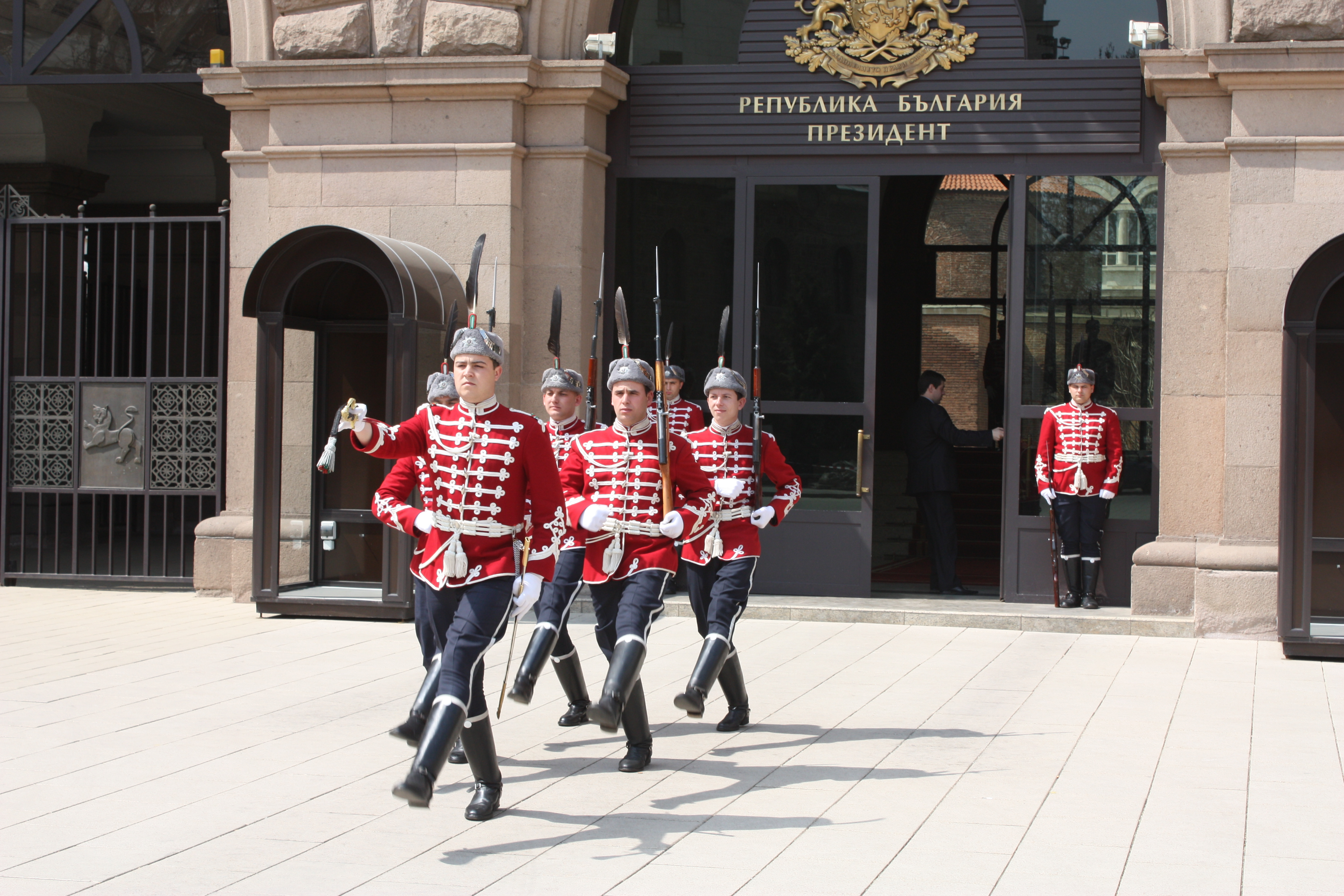
Changing of the Guard

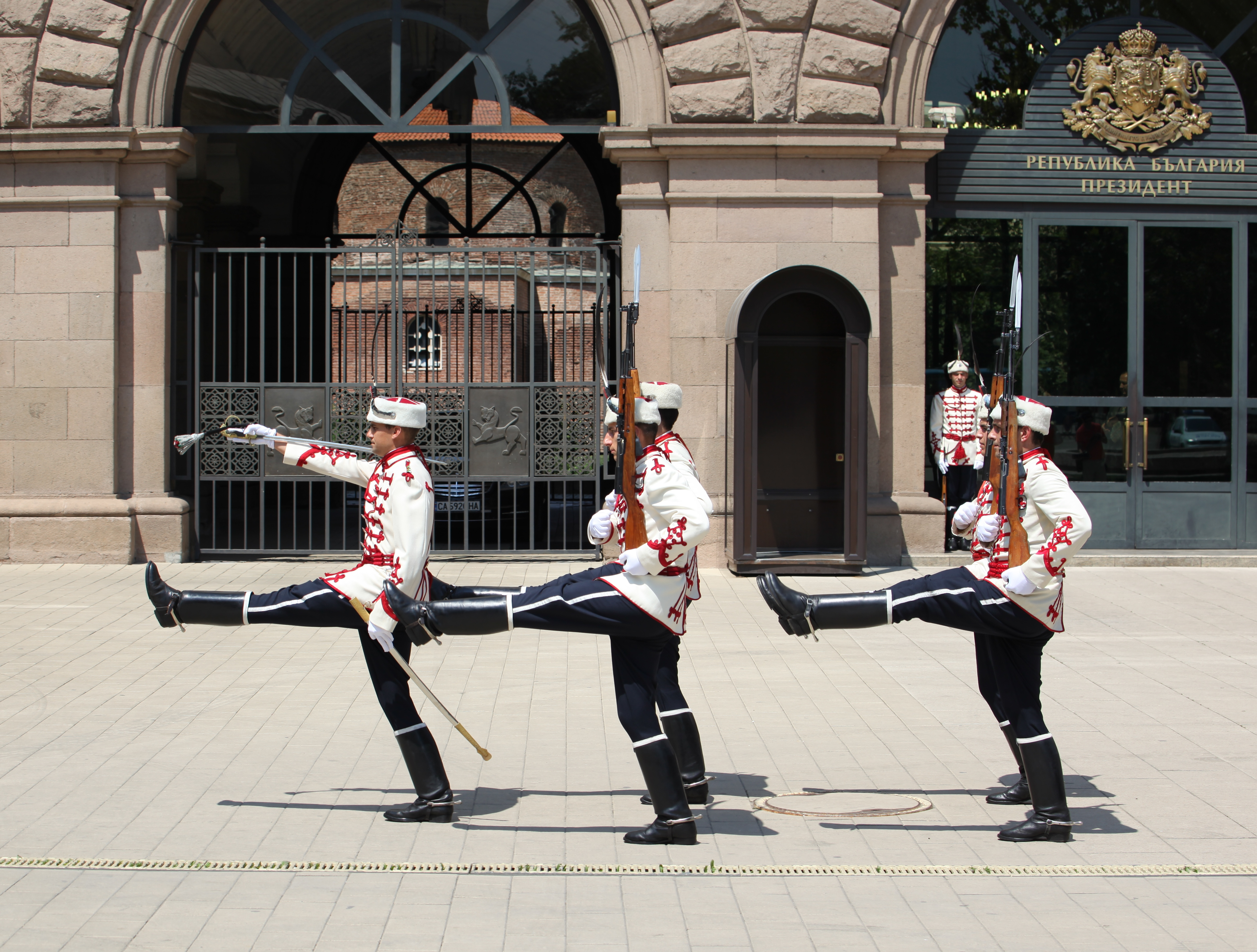
Changing of the Guard

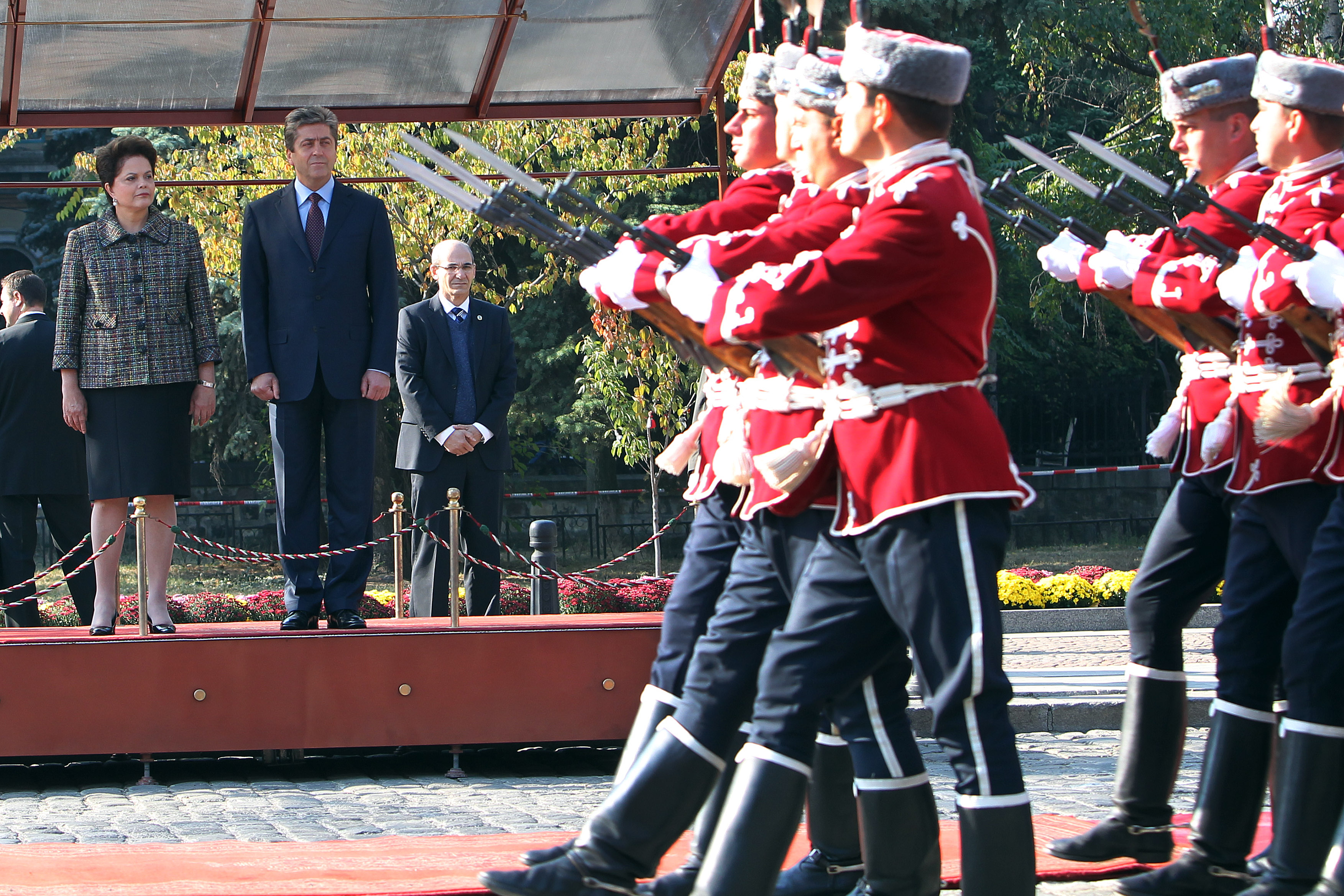
Parade during a visit of the President of Brazil Dilma Rousseff

== See also ==
- Coat of arms of Bulgaria
- Flag of Bulgaria
- „Mila Rodino“
- List of army units called Guards for other guard units.
