= Encyclopedia Bulgaria =

Bulgarian encyclopedia

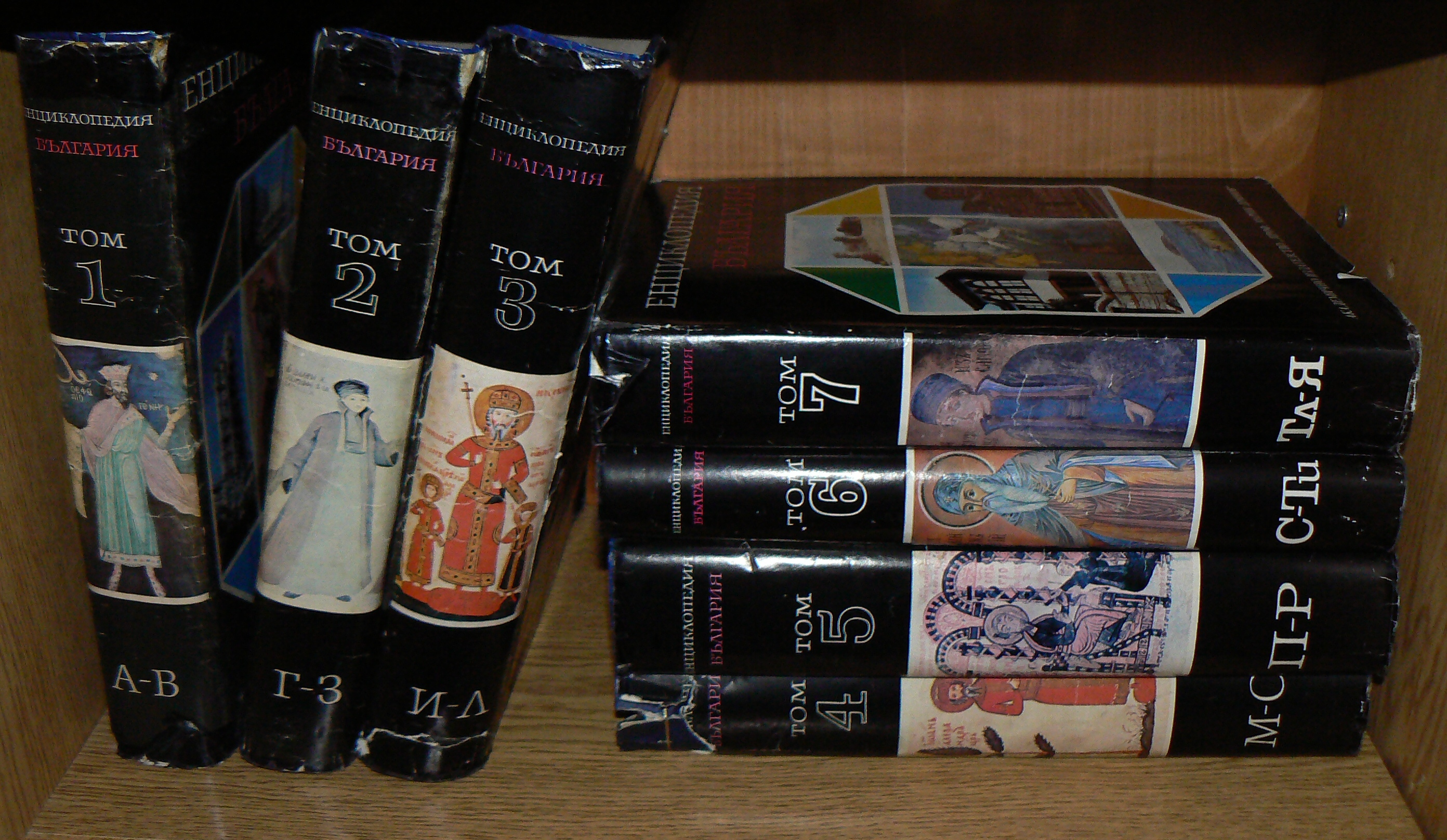
The seven volumes of Encyclopedia Bulgaria

The Encyclopedia Bulgaria (Bulgarian: Енциклопедия "България") is an encyclopedia in seven volumes, published by the Bulgarian Academy of Sciences and dedicated to the 1300th anniversary of the founding of the Bulgarian state. The encyclopedia contains articles on historical, geographical and cultural themes, biographical articles about important Bulgarian statesmen and revolutionaries, political, social, scientific, cultural, economic and sports figures as well as articles on current and historical settlements and administrative divisions of Bulgaria. The work was based on the Great Bulgarian Encyclopedia that was published between 1963 and 1969.

The original plan of editor Vladimir Georgiev was to publish 6 volumes containing about 20,000 articles with more than 10,000 black and white and color illustrations and maps. Subsequently, the last volume was divided into two parts by the editor of the seventh volume, Angel Balevski.

Among the members of the editorial board were Dimitar Angelov, Georgi Bokov, Kiril Bratanov, Prof. Zhivko Gylybov, Pantelei Zarev, Prof. Dimitar Kossev, and Atanas Stoykov, among others.
