= Georgi Dimitrov Mausoleum =

Former tomb in Sofia, Bulgaria

- Мавзолей на Георги Димитров
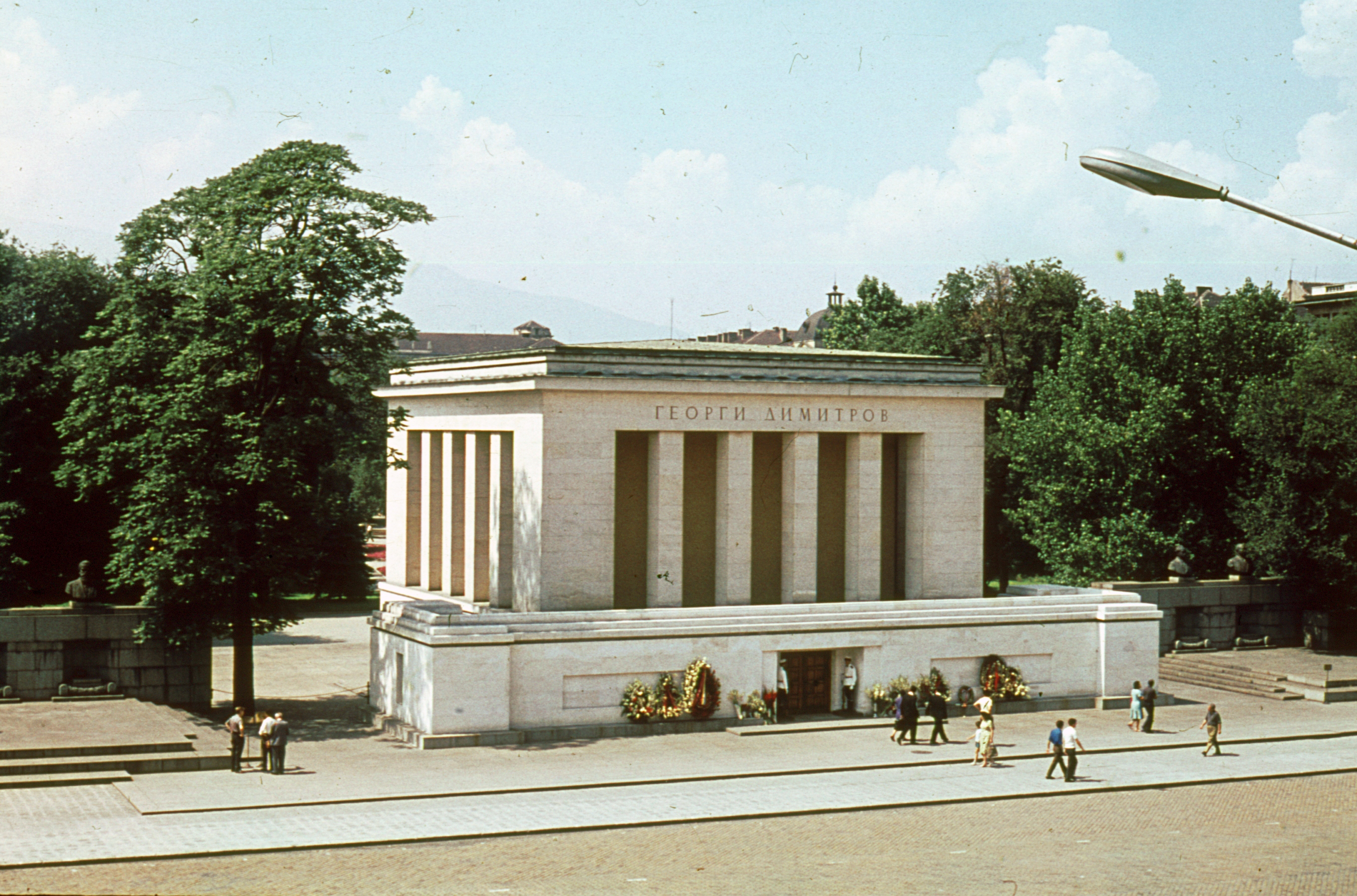
- The Georgi Dimitrov Mausoleum in 1968
- Location: Sofia, Bulgaria
- Coordinates: 42°41′45″N 23°19′34″E
- Designer: Georgi Ovcharov; Racho Ribarov; Ivan Danchov
- Type: Memorial
- Material: Stone
- Beginning date: 2 July 1949
- Completion date: 10 July 1949
- Dedicated to: Georgi Dimitrov
- Dismantled date: 21–27 August 1999
- Architectural style: Socialist realism

The Georgi Dimitrov Mausoleum (Bulgarian: мавзолей на Георги Димитров) was a ceremonial tomb on Prince Alexander of Battenberg Square in Sofia, Bulgaria.

It was built in 1949 to house the embalmed body of Georgi Dimitrov, the first leader of Communist Bulgaria. After his death in 1950, the second communist leader of Bulgaria, Vasil Kolarov, was buried in the second niche of the east wall of the mausoleum. In 1999, following a heated public debate, it was destroyed by Ivan Kostov's UDF government.

== Construction ==
The white marble mausoleum was built in 1949 to contain the embalmed body of the first leader of Communist Bulgaria, Georgi Dimitrov (1882–1949); construction beginning immediately after the news of Dimitrov's death. It was completed in just six days, the time it took Dimitrov's body to be returned to Sofia from the USSR. Dimitrov's body remained in the mausoleum until August 1990, when Dimitrov's remains were cremated and the ashes buried in Central Sofia Cemetery.

== Attempt to blow up the mausoleum ==
In 1956, 14 anti-communists prepared a bombing of the mausoleum during a May Day demonstration. Clock bombs would have exploded after the leadership of the Bulgarian Communist Party and the country came on the podium. The act, which was planned by Stoyan Zarev, was intended to draw the attention of the world media to Bulgaria. In addition to the Mausoleum, Zarev also planned to blow up five important ministries. The group encountered difficulties in implementing the plan and was greatly delayed, until they were uncovered and arrested by the KDS in February 1960.

== Maintenance and activities ==
The mausoleum was an object of police protection of paramount importance. The mausoleum was the center of state ceremonies in the People's Republic of Bulgaria, a place where foreign delegations laid wreaths when visiting the country and the state leadership from its rostrum received the demonstrations and parades on the official holidays. The Bulgarian Land Forces’s National Guards Unit formerly performed public duties at the mausoleum, in a ritual similar to today's changing of the guard at the Presidency. The guards at the mausoleum were part of Post No. 1, which was mounted on Sundays, Wednesdays, and on solemn occasions. Soldiers were selected from the Bulgarian People's Army as well as the Internal Troops of the Ministry of Interior. There were no cartridges in the rifles while on duty, as police were always on duty in the area.

In 1974–1975 a major reconstruction of the mausoleum was carried out. The premises under the mourning hall were expanded and the air conditioning system was replaced, a plastically designed monumental door, the crystal chamber-sarcophagus and mosaics by Dechko Uzunov were installed.

== Destruction ==
The mausoleum itself was destroyed by Prime Minister Ivan Kostov's UDF government in 1999 after a heated nationwide debate. The prime minister and his party claimed that retaining the mausoleum was inappropriate following the fall of Communism in 1989 because it represented Bulgaria's repressive past. Even within the government there was opposition to destroying the building, and an opinion poll revealed that two-thirds of the population opposed the demolition. Proposals were made to turn the mausoleum into a museum or art gallery because it contributed to the unique atmosphere of Sofia.

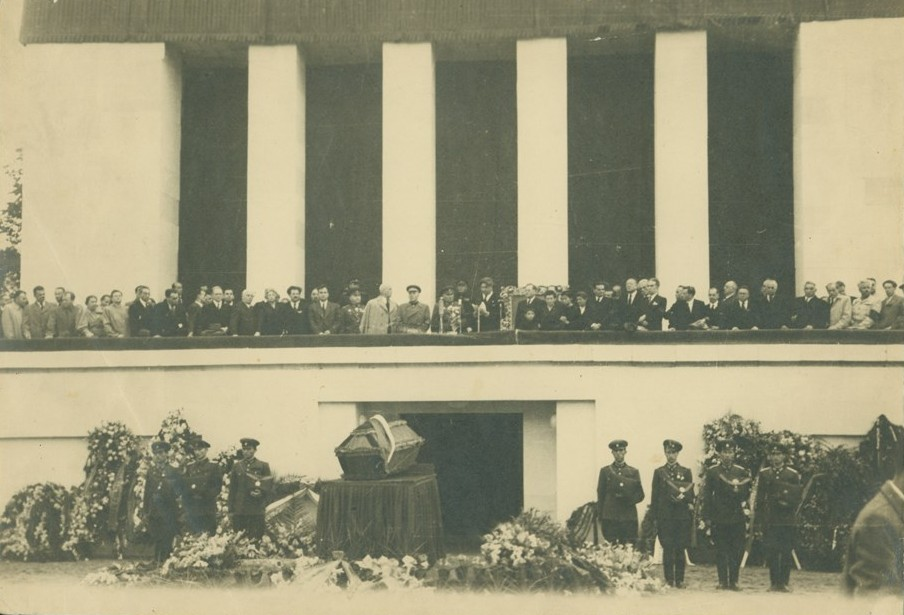
The newly-built mausoleum with Dimitrov's coffin in front. Valko Chervenkov speaks at the tribune, July 1949.

In August 1999, the government made four attempts to demolish the building. The first three failed because they relied on a single powerful explosion. The building did not budge after the first two attempts and tilted only slightly after the third. The fourth (and successful) attempt was carried out using a series of consecutive, less powerful explosions.

== See also ==
- Lenin's Mausoleum
