= Prokopy =

Prokopy (Russian: Прокопий, Greek: Προκόπιος) is a Russian masculine given name of Greek origin. It is also an occasional surname. It may refer to the following people:

Given name

- Prokopy Lyapunov (died 1611), Russian statesman
- Prokopy Yelizarov (died 1681), Russian statesman
- Prokopy Zubarev (1886–1938), Russian statesman

Surname

- Ronald J. Prokopy (1935–2004), American entomologist
