= Representative Brass Band of the National Guards Unit of Bulgaria =

- Гвардейски представителен духов оркестър към Националната гвардейска част на България
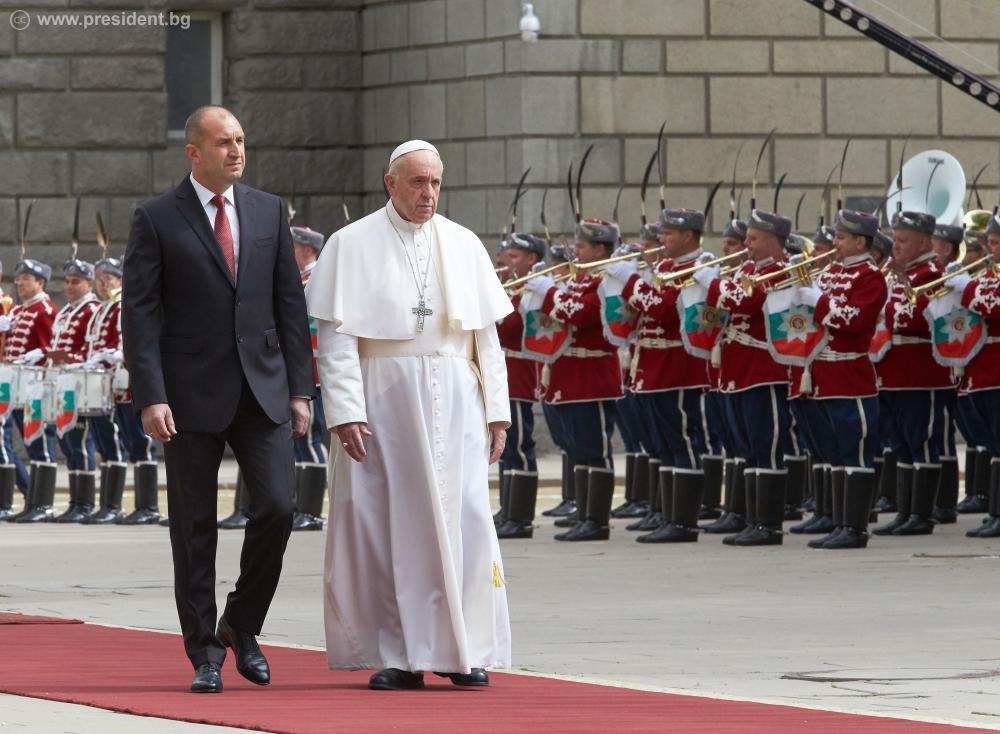
- President Rumen Radev and Pope Francis inspecting the band in Sofia, 5 May 2019.
- Active: 1878; 148 years ago
- Country: Bulgaria
- Allegiance: President of Bulgaria
- Branch: Bulgarian Armed Forces
- Type: Military band
- Part of: National Guards Unit of Bulgaria
- Headquarters: Veliko Tarnovo (1878–1892); Sofia (1892-Present)
- Nickname: Guards Band
- Patron: Saint George
- Anniversaries: July 12

Commanders
- Current commander: Lt.Col Radi Radev

Insignia
- Flag of the Armed Forces

The Representative Brass Band of the National Guards Unit of Bulgaria (Bulgarian: Гвардейски представителен духов оркестър към Националната гвардейска част на България) is the official representative brass band of the National Guards Unit of the Bulgarian Armed Forces. Stationed in the capital of Sofia, the band works together with the National Guards Unit during events where the President of Bulgaria receives heads of state and government at the Largo in Sofia.

== History ==
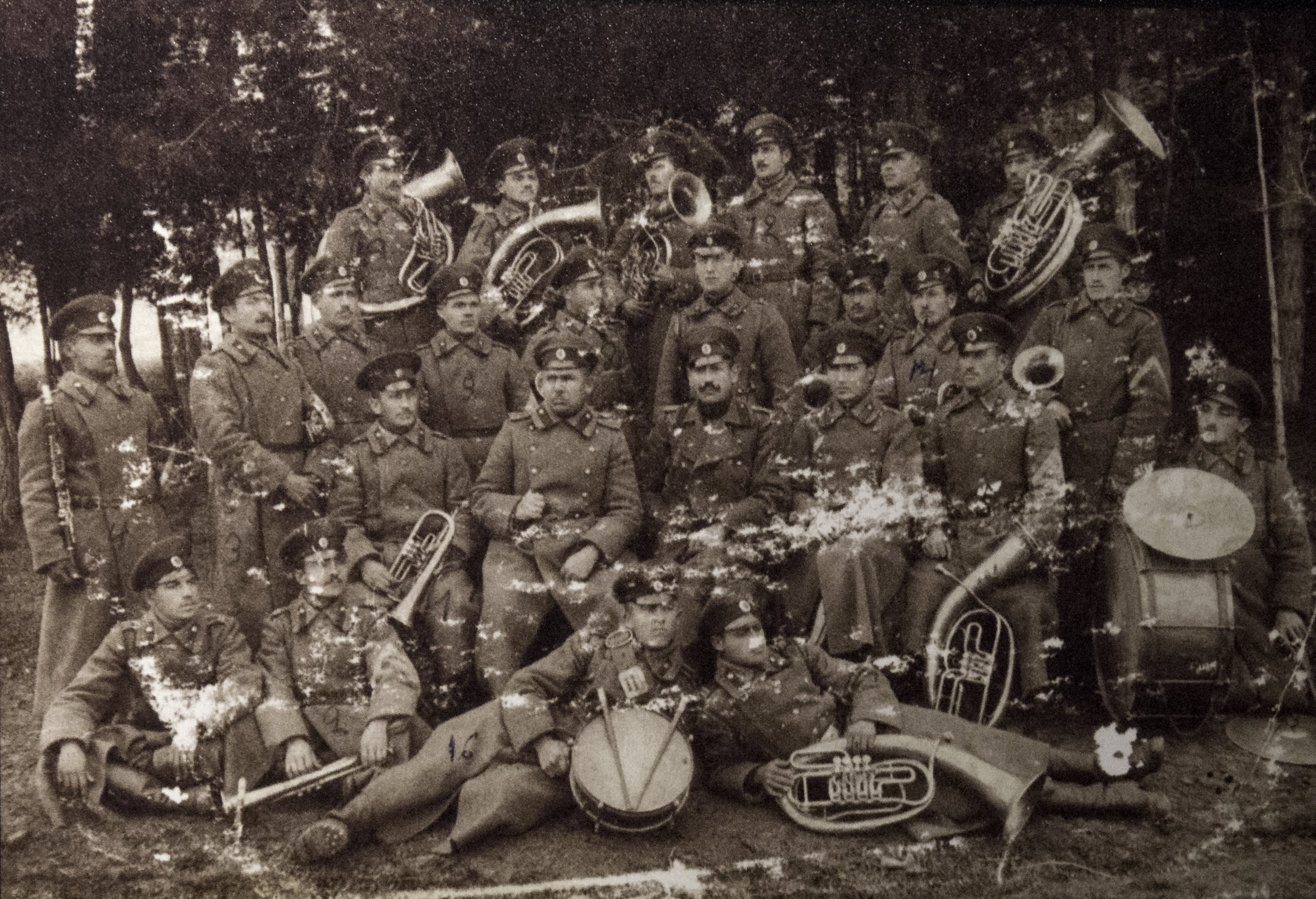
The band in the early 20th century.

It was commissioned by the Bulgarian Government in 1878, with originally 20 Czech musicians led by Josef Chochola in the band. In 1892 this orchestra was transferred to Sofia from Veliko Tarnovo and was enlisted as part of the Bulgarian Life Guards Squadron. The first ethnic Bulgarian to be appointed as the chief conductor of the band was Maestro Georgi Atanasov. In 1944, after the communist coup, the band was dissolved and the remaining musicians were sent to the town of Breznik. In 1951, the band was restored as the Central Brass Band of the Bulgarian People's Army. Since its restoration, the band's musicians wore regular infantry uniforms instead of the uniform of the guards unit. The guards band was reestablished in 2001, with its former status and original name.

== Music ==
Most of the pieces of music are performed by the band at the Bulgarian Armed Forces Day parade in Sofia or during official protocol ceremonies.

- Botev's March
- Great are our Soldiers (The official anthem and hymn of the Bulgarian Armed Forces)
- Son’s Duty
- One Legacy
- Near the Bosphorous
- Dobrudzha region
- We are to be victorious
- Festive Sofia

== List of conductors ==
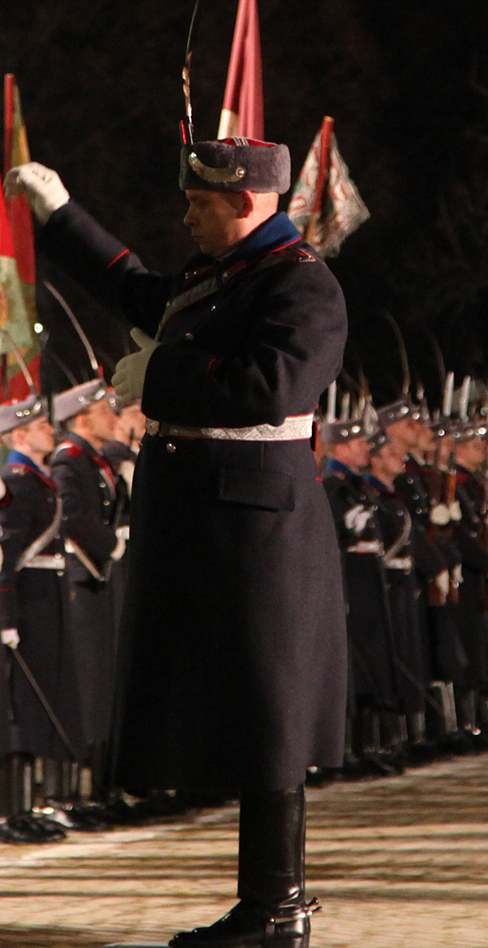
Radi Radev

- Josef Chochola (1878–1895)
- Emanuil Manolov (1895–1914)
- Georgi Atanasov (1914–1920; 1923–1926)
- Nikola Tsonev (?)

== See also ==
- Representative Central Band of the Romanian Army
- Ottoman military band
- Serbian Guards Unit Band
- Military Band of Athens
