= Monument to the Unknown Soldier, Sofia =

Monument in Sofia, Bulgaria

Coordinates: 42°41′47″N 23°19′53″E

Monument to the Unknown Soldier Паметник на Незнайния воин
- Bulgaria
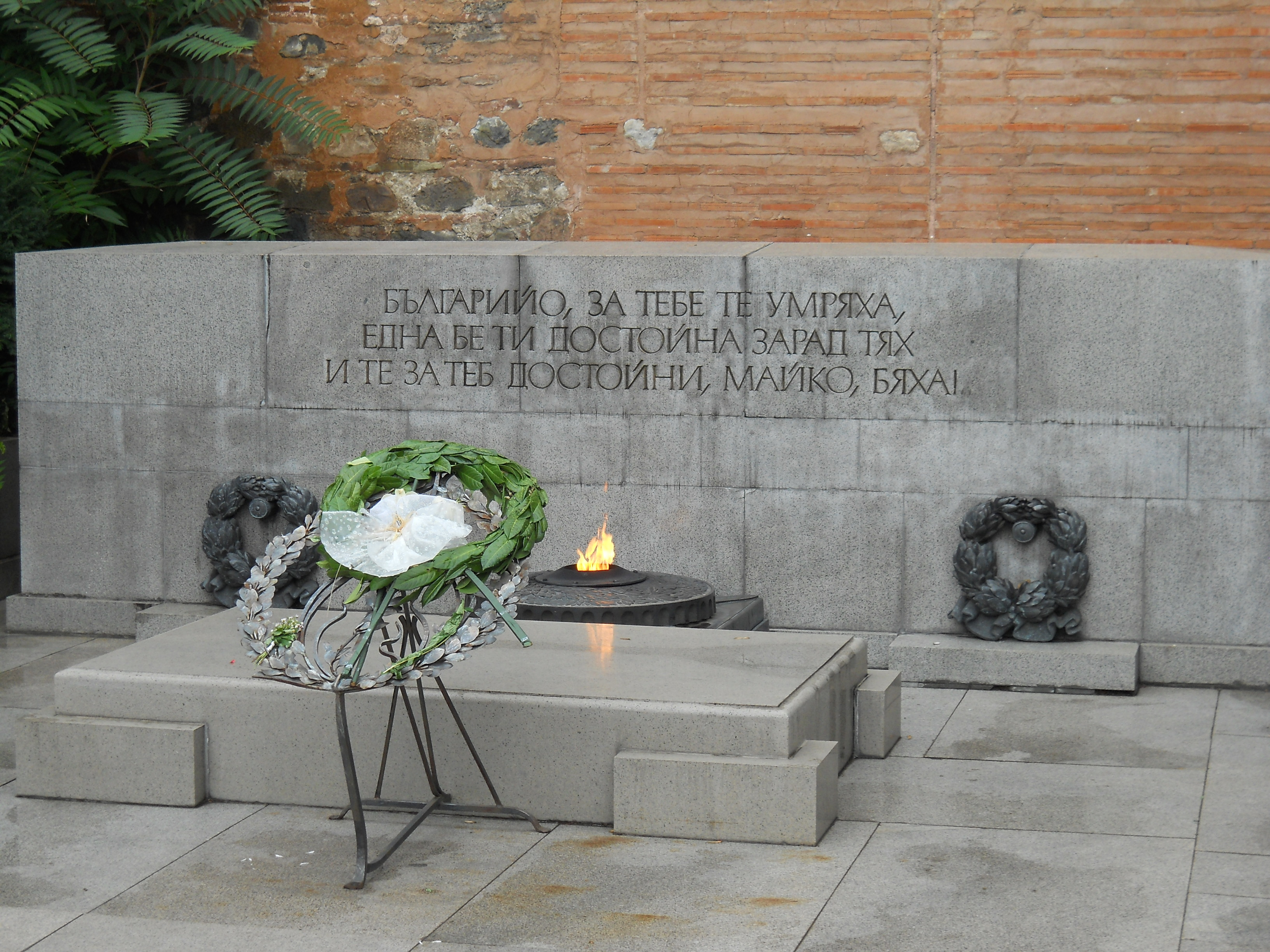
- Monument to the Unknown Soldier
- For the Battle of Stara Zagora and the Battle of Shipka Pass heroes
- Unveiled: September 22, 1981
- Location: near Sofia
- Designed by: Nikola Nikolov

The Monument to the Unknown Soldier (Bulgarian: Паметник на Незнайния воин, Pametnik na Neznayniya voin) is a monument in the centre of Sofia, the capital of Bulgaria, located just next to the 6th-century Church of St Sophia, on 2 Paris Street. The monument commemorates the hundreds of thousands of Bulgarian soldiers who died in wars defending their homeland. Ceremonies involving the President of Bulgaria and foreign state leaders are often performed here.

The monument was designed by architect Nikola Nikolov and opened on September 22, 1981, the 1300th anniversary of establishment of the Bulgarian state.

The Monument to the Unknown Soldier features an eternal flame, turf from Stara Zagora and Shipka Pass, sites of two of the most important battles of the Russo-Turkish War of Liberation (the Battle of Stara Zagora and the Battle of Shipka Pass), a sculpture of a lion (a national symbol of Bulgaria) by the noted sculptor Andrey Nikolov, as well as a stone inscription of a stanza (part of The New Graveyard Above Slivnitsa 1885 poem) by the national writer Ivan Vazov:

БЪЛГАРИЙО, ЗА ТЕБЕ ТЕ УМРЯХА,

ЕДНА БЕ ТИ ДОСТОЙНА ЗАРАД ТЯХ

И ТЕ ЗА ТЕБ ДОСТОЙНИ, МАЙКО, БЯХА!

O BULGARIA, FOR YOU THEY DIED,

ONLY ONE WERE YOU WORTHY OF THEM

AND THEY OF YOU WORTHY, O MOTHER, WERE!

After the end of the First World War, a group of Bulgarians proposed building the monument. However, strong opposition to the building of this monument arose. Some Bulgarian intellectuals argued that a monument of an unknown soldier is unacceptable since it would imply that the names of the soldiers have been forgotten. "Not a single soldier shall be forgotten who gave his life in this war and in all other wars for the freedom of Bulgaria!".

The monument was designed but was not displayed because of the above-mentioned arguments. The lion itself was considered an abuse for a long time because it was sitting. The pose was considered a metaphor of surrender to the national ideas.
