= Dragan Prokopiev =

Bulgarian choir director

Dragan Prokopiev Vasilev (Bulgarian: Драган Прокопиев Василев), better known as Dragan Prokopiev, is a Bulgarian choir conductor and music pedagogue. He obtained the title "honoured artist" in 1965.

== Biography ==
Prokopiev was born on 18 July 1904 in Kyustendil, Bulgaria to a teacher's family. After finishing secondary school, in 1923, he moved to Leipzig to study the violin with H. Wassermann, followed by specializations in Paris with Lucien Capet in 1924 and 1926, in Písek with the violin pedagogue Otakar Ševčík in 1925 and 1927, as well as in Berlin at the Stern'sches Konservatorium with Carl Flesch from 1928 to 1930.

In 1930, Prokopiev returned to Bulgaria and became a music teacher in the American College of Sofia, establishing his own private music school that existed until 1936. In 1940, he taught at the First Male Gymnasium of Sofia.

During the Second World War, Prokopiev had the idea of creating the vocal choir of the Bulgarian army. Soon after the Bulgarian coup d'état of 1944, he established the Representative Choir to the Bulgarian People's Army, renamed afterwards as Ensemble for Songs and Dances of the BPA, and nowadays: Representative Ensemble of the Bulgarian Armed Forces. Prokopiev was conductor of the choir until 1957. The first choir's performance took place in 1944, a concert by 26 vocalists. Later, Prokopiev started attracting instrumentalists, too, as well as some of the finest Bulgarian opera singers of the time, such as Dimitar Uzunov and Nikola Nikolov, as well as the composer Asen Karastoyanov, who composed approximately 50 songs especially for the choir.

In 1941, Prokopiev wrote "Methodics of singing", in which he developed the topic of singing as a separate subject in Bulgarian schools. Apart from his pedagogical and methodological activities, he was an active violin performer as a member of two quartets for chamber music: The Czech Quartet (1927) and the Sofia Quartet (1932–1935), where he performed together with Todor Vazharov, Konstantin Starchev and Georgi Ivanov.

Prokopiev died in 1988 in Sofia. His archive from the period 1913–1975 has been filed under ID 655 in the Bulgarian Archives State Agency.
