= Sergey Prokopyev =

Sergey Prokopyev may refer to:

- Sergey Prokopyev (beach volleyball)
- Sergey Prokopyev (cosmonaut)
