= Georgi Atanasov (composer) =

Bulgarian composer (1882–1931)

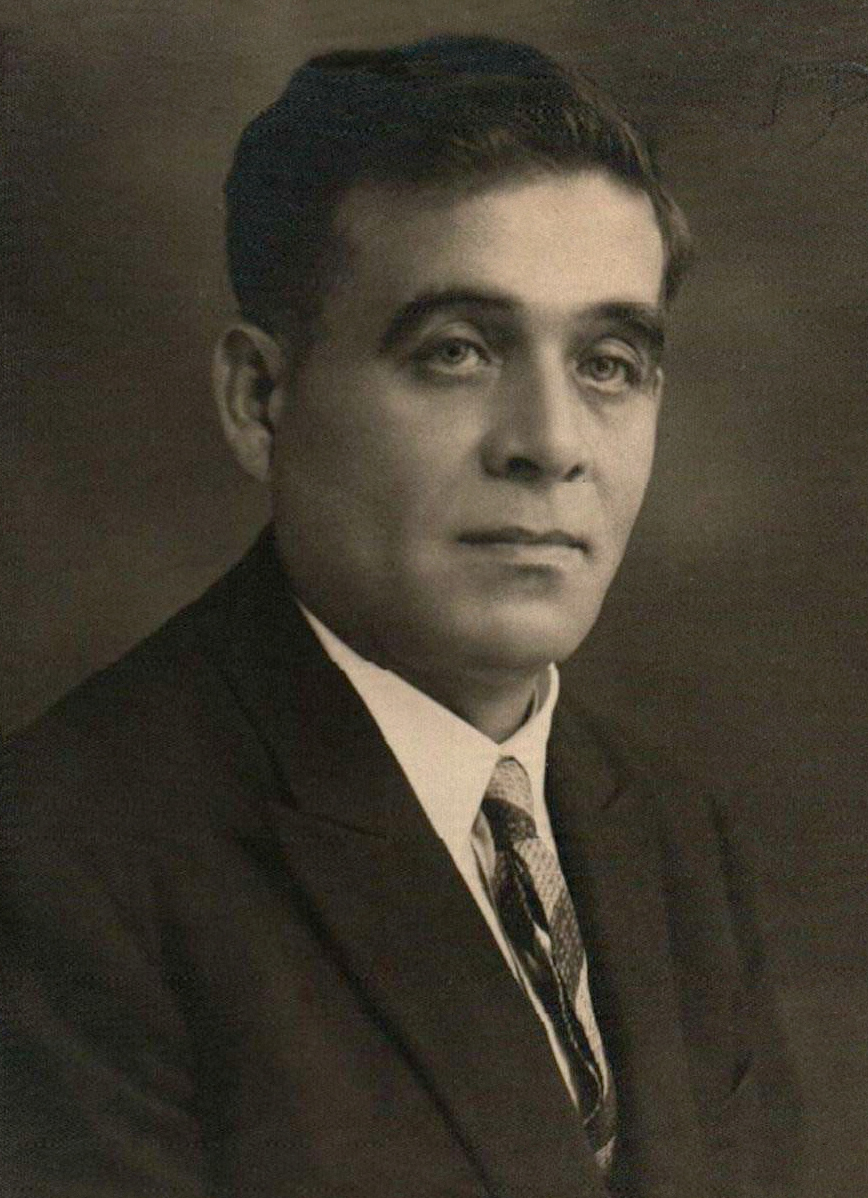
Georgi Atanasov. Source: Bulgarian Archives State Agency

Georgi Atanasov (Bulgarian: Георги Атанасов) (May 6, 1882 – November 17, 1931) was a Bulgarian composer.

== Biography ==
A native of Plovdiv, Atanasov began formal musical studies in Bucharest at the age of 14. From 1901 until 1903 he studied composition at the Rossini Conservatory in Pesaro with Pietro Mascagni. Upon receiving his diploma with the title of "maestro", he adopted the word as his formal style of address. He returned to Bulgaria soon after, becoming well known as a leader of military bands. He conducted the Sofia National Opera for the 1922/23 season.

Atanasov was the first professional Bulgarian opera composer. His style is Italianate, melodic and bearing the influence of folk idioms. He alternated contrasting musical numbers to achieve dramatic effect in his works.

== Operas ==
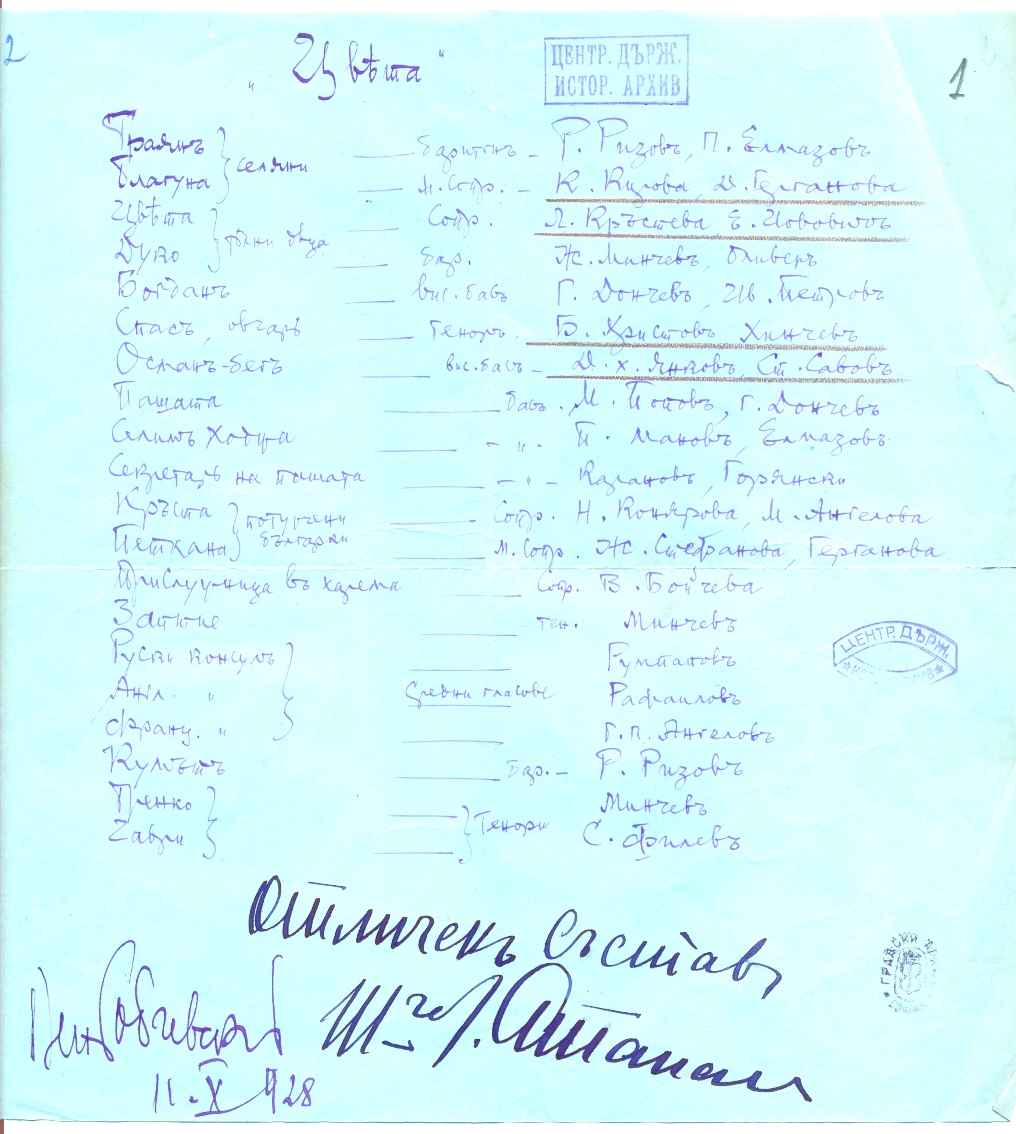
Personages and performers of the opera "Tsveta" with a positive resolution of the cast made by G. Atanasov. Sofia, 11 October 1928. Source: Bulgarian Archives State Agency

- Borislav (1911)
- Moralisti (operetta) (1916)
- Gergana (1917)
- Zapustyalata vodenitsa (The Abandoned Watermill) (1923)
- Tsveta (1925)
- Kosara (1929)
- Altzec (1930)

== Honours ==
Atanasov Ridge in Antarctica is named after the composer. Until 2001, Georgi Atanasov Military Music School was an institution of the Bulgarian People's Army and the Bulgarian Armed Forces for military musicians.
