= Nikola Nikolov (opera singer) =

Bulgarian opera singer (1925–2007)

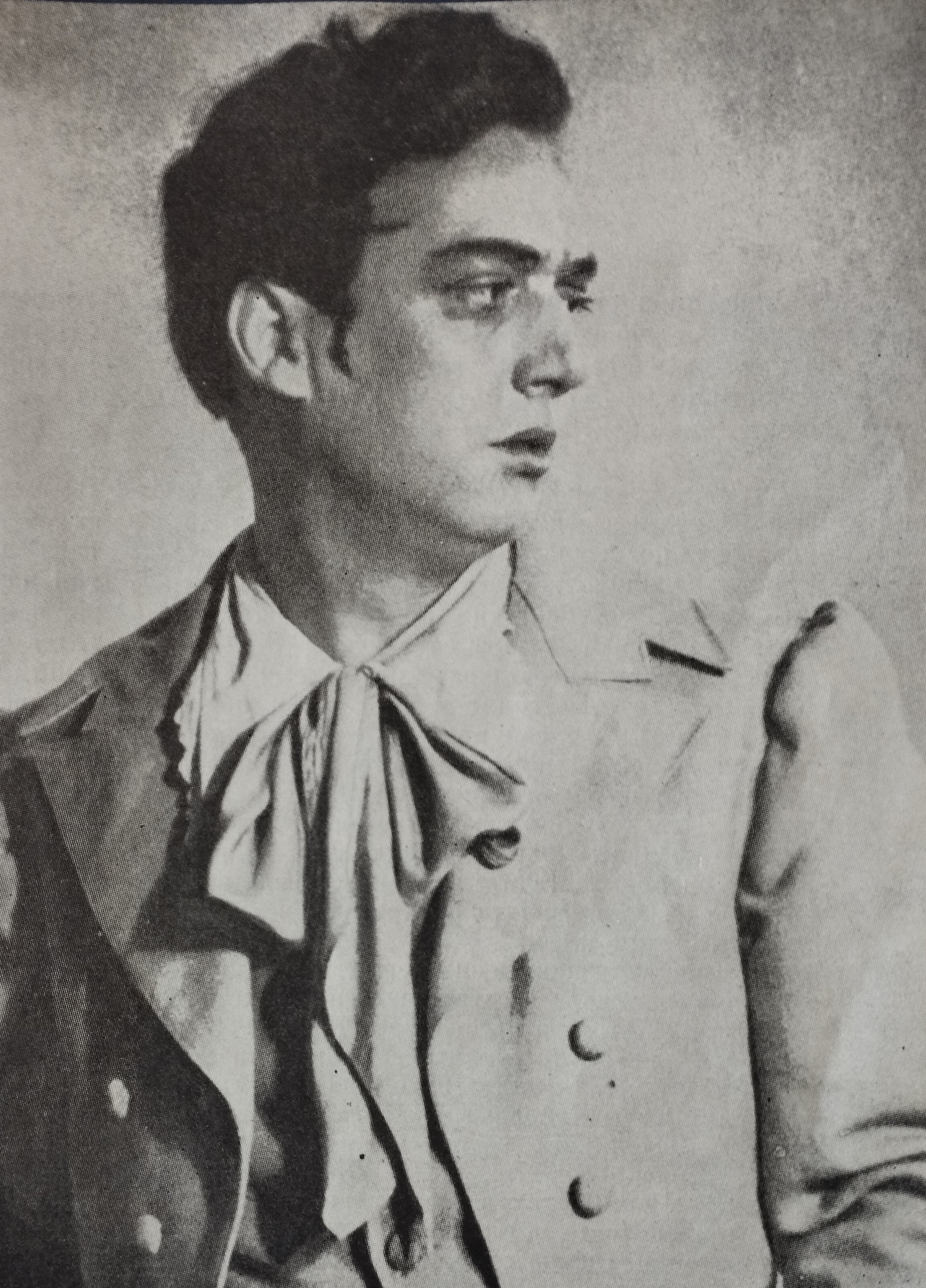
Nikola Nikolov as Kavaradossi, 1954

Nikola Nikolov (Bulgarian: Никола Николов, March 23, 1925 – July 8, 2007) was a Bulgarian opera singer (tenor) and vocal pedagogue, who sang on the Bulgarian and world opera stages in the second half of the 20th century. His voice has been described as a beautiful, powerful tenor, brilliant in the highs and expressive in the middle and low registers. In his long singing career Nikola Nikolov sang almost all the central tenor parts of the Italian masters.

== Biography ==
He was born on March 23, 1925, in Sofia, into a poor family of Bulgarian refugees from Kukush (then in the Ottoman Empire, today Kilkis in Greece).

His school teacher, the famous Bulgarian artist Nenko Balkanski, saw in him a talent for painting and encouraged him to take up painting. The boy loved this, but he also became strongly interested in music, watching musical films with the most prominent singers of the time, including Beniamino Gigli. At the age of thirteen, he attended an opera performance for the first time and from that moment his path was outlined. His singing teacher at school, Kiril Ikonomov, helped him with advice. At the age of 17, he was impressed by the singer and actor Săbcho Săbev, and asked him for training; he studied with him for two years. During his military service, he was a soloist of the Bulgarian Army Ensemble for two years. In 1946, he was accepted into the Sofia Opera, and at the same time he passed the entrance exams for a student at the Bulgarian Conservatory, ranked first.

A little later, he was invited to the newly opened Varna Opera Theatre by its director Petăr Raichev. He accepted the invitation, giving up everything else, and after his operatic debut in 1947 as Pinkerton in Puccini's Madama Butterfly quickly established himself as the opera's leading soloist. Next are the roles of Turiddo in Cavalleria rusticana (1948), Germont in La traviata, and many others.

At the Varna Opera he met the singer Lilyana Vasileva, soprano, who became his wife. They sang together in many operas.

His first international awards were the gold medals at the World Youth Festival in Berlin (1951) and in Bucharest (1953). In 1953, he went to Moscow for specialization.

At the Stanislavsky and Nemirovich-Danchenko Theatre he took part in the premiere of Les vêpres siciliennes as Arrigo. Iinvited to the Bolshoi Theatre, he sang in Carmen and Madama Butterfly, and made a long tour of the Soviet Union.

After returning to Bulgaria (1956), as a soloist of the Sofia Opera he performed Don José and Manrico, and participated in the premieres of Turandot, Les vêpres siciliennes, Tosca, La bohème, Moniuszko' Halka, Cavalleria rusticana, Otello.

In 1956, at the Viotti competition in Vercelli, he won first place among tenors and fourth place in the overall standings. This was followed by specialization in Italy (1957–1959), where he worked with vocal pedagogue Zita Fumagali Riva.

On February 11, 1959, Nikola Nikolov made his debut at La Scala in Bedřich Smetana's The Bartered Bride, conducted by Lovro von Matačić. In Vercelli, he sang Cavaradossi from Puccini's Tosca. Critics point out his success both in singing and artistic terms.

After La Scala, he sang at the London's Covent Garden, the Metropolitan Opera in New York, the Vienna State Opera, the Bolshoi Theatre in Moscow, the San Carlo in Naples, the Teatro la Fenice in Venice, the Teatro Massimo in Palermo, the São Carlos in Lisbon, the Rome Opera House and other around the world.

He was offered a full-time job by Covent Garden, the Metropolitan, and the State Opera, but preferred to live in Bulgaria. Music historians write: "Nikola Nikolov seemed to have gathered all the love of the opera audience, just as he gave it his love without a trace." They tell how after performances hundreds of his admirers would gather in front of the opera's back entrance, applaud, lift him up in their arms, and carry him like a triumphant ancient hero to his home at Dondukov Street, 300 meters from the opera, while singing the Triumphal March from Aida.

In his long singing career Nikola Nikolov sang almost all the central tenor parts of the Italian masters.

Nikola Nikolov was also a vocal teacher. Among his students were Kaludi Kaludov, Bozhidar Nikolov, Kostadin Andreev, Dimitar Damyanov, Penyo Pirozov and many others.

Nikola Nikolov died on July 7, 2007, in Sofia.
