= Bulgarian Land Forces =

Bulgarian army

Bulgarian Land Force
- Сухопътни войски на България
- The war flag of the Bulgarian land forces
- Founded: 1878
- Country: Bulgaria
- Type: Army
- Size: 17,000 active personnel
- Part of: Bulgarian Armed Forces
- Garrison/HQ: Sofia
- Patron: Saint George
- March: Great is our Soldier
- Anniversaries: 6 May
- Website: landforce.armf.bg

Commanders
- Minister of Defence: Atanas Zapryanov
- Commander of the Land Forces: Major General Deyan Deshkov

Insignia
- Emblem

The Bulgarian Land Forces (Bulgarian: Сухопътни войски на България, romanized: Sukhopŭtni voĭski na Bŭlgariya, lit. 'Ground Forces of Bulgaria') are the ground warfare branch of the Bulgarian Armed Forces. It is administered by the Ministry of Defence, previously known as the Ministry of War during the Tsardom of Bulgaria. The Land Forces were established in 1878, when they were composed of anti-Ottoman militia (opalchentsi) and were the only branch of the Bulgarian military.

The Land Forces were made up of conscripts throughout most of Bulgaria's history. During World War I, it fielded more than one million troops out of Bulgaria's total population of around four million. Two-year conscription was obligatory during Communism (1946–1990), but its term was reduced in the 1990s. Conscription for all branches was terminated in 2008; since then, the Land Forces are a volunteer force. Bulgarian Land Forces troops are deployed on peacekeeping missions in Afghanistan, Bosnia and Herzegovina and Kosovo.

Since 2004, the Land Forces are in a process of continued restructuring. Under the most recent reform, brigades were reduced to regiments, while several garrisons and brigades were disbanded.

== Functions ==
The Land Forces are functionally divided into 'Active" and "Reserve Forces". Their main functions include deterrence, defense, peace support and crisis management, humanitarian and rescue missions, as well as social functions within Bulgarian society.

The Active Forces mainly have peacekeeping and defensive duties, and are further divided into Deployment Forces, Immediate Reaction, and Main Defense Forces. The Reserve Forces consists of Enhancement Forces, Territorial Defense Forces, and Training Grounds. They deal with planning and reservist preparation, armaments and equipment storage, training of formations for active forces rotation or increase in personnel.

During peacetime the Land Forces maintain permanent combat and mobilization readiness. They become part of multinational military formations in compliance with international treaties Bulgaria is a Party of, participate in the preparation of the population, the national economy and the maintenance of wartime reserves and the infrastructure of the country for defense.

In times of crisis the Land Forces' main tasks relate to participation in operations countering terrorist activities and defense of strategic facilities (such as nuclear power plants and major industrial facilities), assisting the security forces in preventing proliferation of weapons of mass destruction, illegal armaments traffic and international terrorism. In case of low- and medium-intensity military conflict the Active Forces that are part of the Land Forces participate in carrying out the initial tasks for the defense of the territorial integrity and sovereignty of the country. In case of a military conflict of high intensity the Land Forces, together with the Air Force and the Navy, aim at countering aggression and protection of the territorial integrity and sovereignty of the country.

== History ==
On 22 July 1878 (10 July O.S.) twelve battalions of opalchentsi who participated in the Liberation War, formed the Bulgarian Armed Forces. According to the Tarnovo Constitution, all men between 21 and 40 years of age were eligible for military service. In 1883 the military was reorganized in four infantry brigades (in Sofia, Pleven, Ruse and Shumen) and one cavalry brigade.

=== Early years ===
The Bulgarian unification of 1885 made Bulgaria the largest Balkan state in terms of territory, which immediately sparked dissent in Serbia and Greece, which demanded territorial compensations. While the agitation of the Greek side calmed down, Serbia – backed by Austria-Hungary – launched a military campaign against Bulgaria. The Serbs, expecting a quick end to the war, suffered losses and were pushed back by Bulgarian troops who did not have higher-ranking officers than captains at the time. Owing to its militaristic policy at the time, Bulgaria was labelled as "the Balkan Prussia".

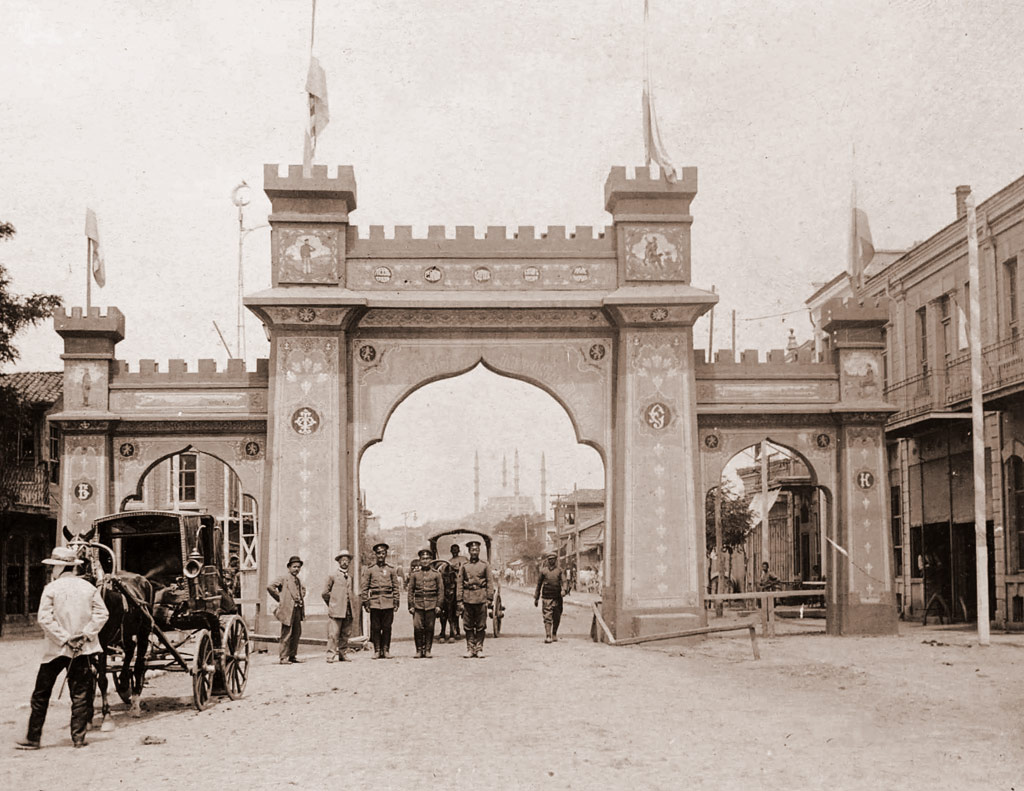
A triumphal arch in Edirne raised in honour of the Bulgarian troops entering the town, 1913

In the early 1900s instability in the Balkans continued, as the collapse of the Ottoman Empire progressed. After an anti-Ottoman rebellion in Macedonia and an Ottoman defeat in the Italo-Turkish War, Bulgaria, Greece, Serbia and Montenegro settled their differences and formed a coalition against the Ottoman Empire, known as the Balkan League. In late September 1912, both the League and the Ottoman Empire mobilised their armies. Montenegro was the first to declare war, on 25 September. The other three states, after issuing an impossible ultimatum to the Sublime Porte on 13 October, declared war on 17 October. Bulgaria was militarily the most powerful of the four states, with a large, well-trained and well-equipped army. The peacetime force of 60,000 men was expanded during the war to 370,000 (more than half of the League's total of 700,000 troops), with almost 600,000 men mobilised in total, out of a population of 4,300,000. The field army counted for 9 infantry divisions, 1 cavalry division and 1,116 artillery units. Bulgarian troops marked a decisive victory at Kirk Kilisse and captured Adrianople after a prolonged siege. A British war correspondent of the era compared the determination of Bulgarian troops to kill their enemy with that of the Japanese and the Gurkhas.

The Second Balkan War began shortly after the end of the first one. A dispute between Bulgaria, Serbia and Greece over the division of Macedonia prompted the Bulgarian leadership to attack its neighbours. Bulgarian troops were still exhausted by the first war, and the majority of Bulgaria's forces were deployed along the Ottoman border. During the war, Bulgaria fought against all its neighbours, including Romania, which did not participate in the first war. The 500,000-man Bulgarian army faced a total of 1,250,000 enemy troops from all sides. Supply and coordination problems and the overwhelming numbers of the attackers brought about an end to the war in less than two months.

=== World Wars ===
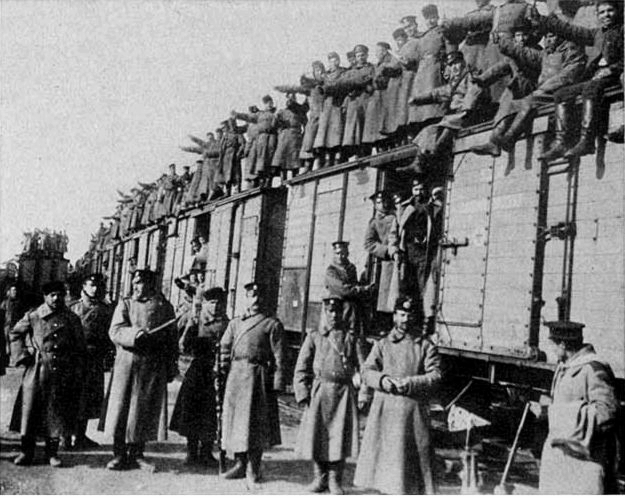
Mobilised Bulgarian troops departing for the front, 1915

The outcome of the Balkan Wars sparked a very strong revanchist sentiment among Bulgarians. In 1915 Germany promised to restore the boundaries according to the Treaty of San Stefano and Bulgaria, which had the largest army in the Balkans, declared war on Serbia in October the same year. In the First World War Bulgaria decisively asserted its military capabilities. The Second Battle of Doiran, with general Vladimir Vazov as commander, inflicted a heavy blow on the numerically superior British Army, which suffered 12,000 casualties against two thousand from the opposite side. One year later, during the Third Battle of Doiran, the United Kingdom, supported by Greece, once again suffered a humiliating defeat, losing 3,155 men against just about five hundred for the Bulgarian side. The reputation of the French Army also suffered badly. The Battle of the Red Wall was marked with the total defeat of the French forces, with 5,700 out of six thousand men killed. The 261 Frenchmen who survived were captured by Bulgarian soldiers. Out of a 4.5 million population, Bulgaria fielded 1,200,000 people in its army. Even this vast expansion of the military could not save Bulgaria from the imminent defeat of its patron Germany. The Allied breakthrough at Dobro Pole and the subsequent soldier mutiny at Vladaya completely disrupted the war effort in 1918. Bulgaria capitulated soon after these events. Bulgarian casualties amounted to 412,000, along with 253,000 refugees created from the lost territories.

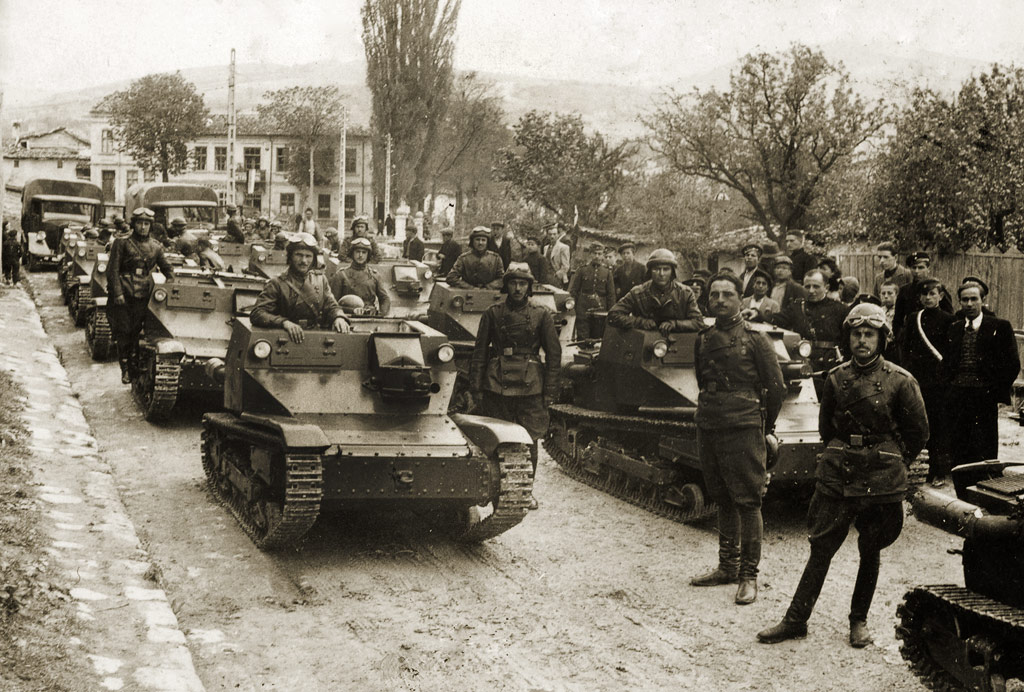
Bulgarian CV-33 tankette unit in the 1930s

During the interbellum the Bulgarian military was not allowed to have active combat aircraft or naval vessels, and the army was reduced to about twenty thousand men in peacetime. In the early 1920s army officers participated in repressions during the Tsankov regime as part of paramilitary groups known as shpitskomandi. In 1923 the army, along with shpitskomandi and Internal Macedonian Revolutionary Organization (IMRO) militia, violently suppressed the leftist September Uprising. Two years later Bulgarian troops stopped a short-lived Greek invasion of southwestern Bulgaria, known as the War of the Stray Dog. By the mid-1930s, the army had begun an expansion in violation of the Treaty of Neuilly-sur-Seine, following the rearmament pattern of Nazi Germany. During this period, the Bulgarian government procured combat aircraft from Germany and France, and light tanks from Italy.

During World War II, Bulgarian troops did not participate in either the invasions of Yugoslavia or Greece, but occupied parts of northern Greece and Yugoslav Macedonia after they were conquered by Germany. The army was the main tool in imposing a policy of relocation, and expulsion of the local Greek population in the occupied areas. By late 1941, more than one hundred thousand Greeks had been expelled from the Bulgarian occupation zone. Increasing attacks by partisans in the latter years of the occupation resulted in a number of executions and wholesale slaughter of civilians in reprisal. In September, 1944, a Red Army-backed left-wing coup d'état overthrew the pro-German government and installed a Fatherland Front government. All active Bulgarian troops were incorporated into the Soviet 3rd Ukrainian Front and began to fight their former German allies. The Bulgarian 1st Army took part in the Yugoslav campaign. During Operation Frühlingserwachen, it fielded 101,000 men. At the end of March 1945, 1st Army led the Nagykanizsa–Körmend Offensive. After defeating the German units, the Bulgarians reached the Austrian Alps and on 13 May they met the British 8th Army near Klagenfurt. The Vienna Offensive was one of the final operations with Bulgarian participation during World War II.

=== Cold War ===
By 1947, the Soviet Union began to strengthen the armed forces of its new satellite state. The only armoured formation in the Army of the Kingdom of Bulgaria was the Armoured Brigade, based in Sofia and armed with German equipment. In addition to the Armoured Brigade a new tank regiment was formed in Samokov with 65 T-34 tanks (in 1947) and an armoured troops school was formed in Botevgrad (in 1950). The formation of the 1st Tank Division also started in Kazanlak in 1947 with T-34s, only to be disbanded in 1949 with its four tank regiments to be converted into tank brigades and subordinated to the 1st, 2nd, 3rd Army and the General Reserve respectively. The front line infantry divisions started forming tank battalions (one each) and several hundred trophy German tanks were transferred to Bulgaria to form a static fortified defensive line along the Turkish border, unofficially called the "Krali Marko Line". Later, when the T-54 and T-55 started replacing the T-34 in larger quantities, some of the retired Soviet tanks were added.

In 1950 two new tank divisions were formed in Sofia and Kazanlak. But, after an evaluation it was decided that with the technological advancements and the increase in weight and dimensions of the arriving tanks, that the predominantly mountainous terrain of Bulgaria was unsuitable for the deployment of tank divisions. Therefore the Bulgarian Land Forces reorganised their tank forces into brigades and regiments.

At the end of 1955 the Bulgarian Land Forces had a peacetime structure of two armies and two independent rifle corps, made up of a total of 9 rifle divisions and 14 other formations. The 16th Mountain Rifle Brigade had been established in 1950 with its headquarters in Zvezdets, being given the old number of the 16th Infantry Division. In addition to that in a case of war five additional rifle divisions and 9 other formations of the different arms would mobilize. With Bulgaria's accession to the Warsaw Pact on 14 May 1955, a new stage commenced. The Land Forces operated 800 tanks and had a formidable artillery corps.

In 1963 the Bulgarian People's Army peacetime strength was set at no less than 100,000 men, with four motor rifle divisions (including the 1st Division, bg:Първа мотострелкова дивизия), the 16th Mountain Brigade had been upgraded into the 16th MRD on 6 February 1961) and five tank brigades at full strength within the Land Forces, and additional three motor rifle divisions at reduced strength. By August 1966, the Institute for Strategic Studies in London was reporting that Bulgaria had a total of eight motorized infantry divisions.

The five tank brigades (9th Tank Brigade at Gorna Banya in Sofia, in the 1st Army, 5th and 11th in the 2nd Army and the 13th Tank Brigade at Sliven, and the 24th Tank Brigade at Aytos in the 3rd Army) included three Tank Battalions, with T-72 main battle tanks or T-55; a motor Rifle Battalion, with BMP-23 infantry fighting vehicles or BMP-1; a Self-propelled Field Artillery Divizion, with 18x self-propelled 122mm 2S1 Gvozdika howitzers; a Reconnaissance Company, with BRDM-2 armored cars and tracked BRM "Sova" reconnaissance vehicles; an Anti-aircraft Battery, with 4x Strela-10 air defence missiles; a missile division, with 2x 9K52 Luna-M ballistic missile launchers (Were being replaced with OTR-21 Tochka in the late 1980s); an Engineer Company; and logistic, maintenance, chemical defence, medical, and signal units.

By July 1987, the International Institute for Strategic Studies estimated that the Land Forces were organised in eight motor rifle divisions, five tank brigades; four surface-to-surface missile brigades with "Scud" SSMs; three artillery regiments; three anti-aircraft artillery regiments; a SAM brigade; and a parachute regiment (later identified as the 68th Independent Parachute Reconnaissance Regiment, forerunner to today's 68th Special Forces Brigade (Bulgaria)) and special commando companies. It appears by the late 1980s that a Bulgarian-helmed Balkan Front was active in embryo, which would unfold and direct the three armies after mobilization. After 1987 the motor rifle divisions were reorganised into brigades as well. At that time the IISS estimated that ground units operated a total of 2,100 tanks (200 T-72 and 1,500 T-54/55) though later estimates have raised the figure to 2,550.

There were no Soviet forces present in the country.

=== Structure and equipment during the Cold War ===
The eight motor rifle divisions did not all have the same structure. Four had a tank regiment and three motor rifle regiments and four divisions fielded four motor rifle regiments. Also the two training/reserve divisions (18th, 21st) were partially equipped with older equipment.

- Motor Rifle Division
  - Motor Rifle Regiment
    - 3x Motor Rifle Battalions, with MT-LB armored personnel carriers
    - Tank Battalion, with T-55 main battle tanks
    - Reconnaissance Company, with BRDM-2 armored cars and tracked BRM "Sova" reconnaissance vehicles
    - Anti-tank Artillery Battery, with towed 100mm T-12 anti-tank guns
    - Air Defence Battery, with a mix of Strela 1 and ZSU-57-2 vehicles
    - Engineer Company
  - Motor Rifle Regiment
    - 3x Motor Rifle Battalions, with BTR-60 wheeled armored personnel carriers
    - Tank Battalion, with T-55 main battle tanks
    - Reconnaissance Company, with BRDM-2 armored cars and tracked BRM "Sova" reconnaissance vehicles
    - Anti-tank Artillery Battery, with towed 100mm T-12 anti-tank guns
    - Air Defence Battery, with a mix of Strela 1 and ZSU-57-2 vehicles
    - Engineer Company
  - Motor Rifle Regiment
    - 3x Motor Rifle Battalions, in trucks and lorries
    - Tank Battalion, with T-55 main battle tanks
    - Reconnaissance Company, with BRDM-2 armored cars and tracked BRM "Sova" reconnaissance vehicles
    - Anti-tank Artillery Battery, with towed 100mm T-12 anti-tank guns
    - Air Defence Battery, with a mix of Strela 1 and ZSU-57-2 vehicles
    - Engineer Company
  - Tank Regiment (Replaced by a fourth MT-LB-equipped motor rifle regiment in the 2nd, 7th, 16th, and 17th motor rifle divisions)
    - 3x Tank Battalions, with T-55 main battle tanks (T-62 main battle tanks in a few units)
    - Motor Rifle Battalion, with MT-LB armored personnel carriers
    - Reconnaissance Company, with BRDM-2 armored cars and tracked BRM "Sova" reconnaissance vehicles
    - Air Defence Battery, with a mix of Strela 1 and ZSU-57-2 vehicles
    - Engineer Company
    - Logistic, maintenance, chemical defence, medical, and signal units
  - Artillery Regiment
    - 3x Field Artillery Division, with 18x towed 122mm M-30 howitzers
    - Heavy Howitzer Artillery Division, with 18x towed 122mm ML-20 howitzers (Were being replaced with towed 152mm D-20 howitzers in the late 1980s)
    - Self-propelled Field Artillery Division, with 18x self-propelled 122mm 2S1 Gvozdika howitzers (Not present in training/reserve divisions)
    - Logistic, maintenance, chemical defence, medical, security, and signal units
  - Air Defence Regiment
    - 5x Anti-aircraft Missile batteries, with either Kub or Osa air defence systems
    - Logistic, maintenance, chemical defence, medical, security, and signal units
  - Reconnaissance Battalion, with BRDM-2 armored cars and tracked BRM "Sova" reconnaissance vehicles (Training/reserve divisions fielded a mix of BRDM-1 and BTR-40 armored cars)
  - Anti-tank Artillery Division, with towed 100mm T-12 anti-tank guns and BRDM-2 vehicles in the anti-tank variant with Konkurs anti-tank missiles (Some units fielded older towed 100mm BS-3 or towed 85mm D-48 anti-tank guns)
  - Missile Division, with 4x 9K52 Luna-M ballistic missile launchers (Were being replaced with OTR-21 Tochka in the late 1980s)
  - Multiple Rocket Launch Artillery Division, with 18x 122mm BM-21 Grad multiple rocket launchers
  - Engineer Battalion
  - Signal Battalion
  - Transport Battalion
  - Supply Battalion
  - Maintenance Battalion
  - Artillery Reconnaissance and Control Battery
  - Chemical Defence Company
  - Commandant's Company (Military Police)
  - Medical-Sanitary Battalion

The only armoured formation in the Army of the Kingdom of Bulgaria was the Armoured Brigade, based in Sofia and armed with German equipment. After the end of the Second World War and the signing of the Paris peace treaty by Bulgaria in 1947, the Soviet Union began to strengthen the armed forces of its new satellite state. In addition to the Armoured Brigade a new tank regiment was formed in Samokov with 65 T-34 tanks (in 1947) and an armoured troops school was formed in Botevgrad (in 1950). A formation of 1st Tank Division also started in Kazanlak in 1947 with T-34s, only to be disbanded in 1949 with its four tank regiments to be converted into tank brigades and subordinated to the 1st, 2nd, 3rd Army and the General Reserve respectively. The front line infantry divisions started forming tank battalions (one each) and several hundred trophy German tanks were transferred to Bulgaria to form a static fortified defensive line along the Turkish border, unofficially called the "Krali Marko Line". Later, when the T-54 and T-55 started replacing the T-34 in larger quantities, some of the retired Soviet tanks were added. In 1950 two new tank divisions were formed (in Sofia and Kazanlak), but with the technological advancements and the increase in weight and dimensions of the tanks at that time after an evaluation it was decided, that the predominantly mountainous terrain of Bulgaria is unsuitable for the deployment of tank divisions and the Bulgarian Land Forces reformed their tank forces into brigades and regiments.

333 Т-72s of Soviet and Czechoslovak manufacture delivered until the collapse of the Socialist bloc and spread between the 9th and 13th tank brigades and training centers. The 5th, 11th and 24th tank brigades and the tank regiments with T-55s. The 220 T-62s put in reserve storage. In 1992 another 100 T-72s and 100 BMP-1s received second-hand from Russia, went to the 24th Tank Brigade.

The five active tank brigades (9th in the 1st Army, 5th and 11th in the 2nd Army and 13th and 24th in the 3rd Army) were organized as follows – three Tank Battalions, with T-72 main battle tanks or T-55; a motor rifle battalion, with BMP-23 infantry fighting vehicles or BMP-1; a self-propelled Field Artillery Divizion, with 18x self-propelled 122mm 2S1 Gvozdika howitzers; a reconnaissance company, with BRDM-2 armored cars and tracked BRM "Sova" reconnaissance vehicles; an anti-aircraft rocket battery, with 4x Strela-10 air defence systems; a missile division, with two 9K52 Luna-M ballistic missile launchers (Were being replaced with OTR-21 Tochka in the late 1980s); an engineer company; and logistic, maintenance, chemical defence, medical, and signal units.

The three rocket artillery brigades included 3x Rocket Artillery Divisions, with 18x 122mm BM-21 Grad multiple rocket launchers; a Rocket Artillery Division, with 130mm RM-51 multiple rocket launchers; and logistic, maintenance, chemical defence, medical, security, and signal units.

The three Army Operational-Tactical Missile Brigades – one for each army, plus a Frontal Operation-Tactical Missile Brigade as General Reserve, each had two missile divisions, with 4x R-300 Elbrus (Scud-B) ballistic missile launchers assigned to each of the Army-level brigades, while the frontal brigade was armed with the R-400 Oka, plus logistic, maintenance, chemical defence, medical, security, and signal units

The three army artillery regiments each had 3x Field Artillery Divizions, with 18x towed 122mm M-30 howitzers; a Long Range Artillery Divizion, with 18x towed 130mm M-46 howitzers; a Heavy Howitzer Artillery Divizion, with 18x towed 122mm ML-20 howitzers (Were being replaced with towed 152mm D-20 howitzers in the late 1980s); and logistic, maintenance, chemical defence, medical, security, and signal units.

The three army anti-tank regiments each comprised three Anti-tank Artillery divizions, with 12x towed 100mm T-12 guns and 6x BRDM-2 vehicles in the anti-tank variant with Konkurs anti-tank missiles, logistic, maintenance, chemical defence, medical, security, and signal units.

=== Disintegration of the socialist block and democratisation reforms ===
By the second half of the 1980s the foreign debt of the People's Republic of Bulgaria has exceeded 100% of its GDP. Combined with the termination by Mikhail Gorbachev of Soviet crude oil deliveries free of charge, which Bulgaria was able to refine and export to Western buyers at considerable gain, these factors have put the economy of the People's Republic in a very difficult situation. The attempts in 1987 made by the country's leader Zhivkov to secure fresh loans from West German commercial banks with the help of then Prime Minister of Bavaria Franz Josef Strauss proved unsuccessful. Thus even before the Fall of the Berlin Wall and the rapid disintegration of the socialist economic and military block, the Bulgarian People's Army has put in motion plans for forces reduction, caused by budget constrains. In the land forces the main result was the disbanding one tank brigade (out of five) and the transformation of four motor rifle divisions (out of eight) into territorial training centers during peacetime (with personnel in the 1 100 - 1 300 range). At the same time the 2nd Army lost its status as a combat formation during peacetime altogether, with its area of responsibility split between the 1st and the 3rd Army. By the end of 1989 and the beginning of 1990 the general force structure of the Land Forces was as follows:

Land Forces Command - Sofia

- 76th Front Ballistic Missile Brigade - Telish
- 31st Front Missile Air Defence Brigade - Stara Zagora
- 74th Front Missile Air Defence Technical Base - Shivachevo
- 68th Parachute Reconnaissance Regiment - Plovdiv
- 65th Signals Regiment - Nova Zagora
- 54th Engineer Regiment - Svishtov
- 59th Chemical Defence Regiment - Gorna Oryahovitsa
- 3rd Separate Radiotechnical [airspace surveillance] Battalion - Nova Zagora
- People's Higher Military School "Vasil Levski" - Veliko Tarnovo
- People's Higher Artillery Military School "Georgi Dimitrov" - Shumen
- People's School for Reserve Officers "Hristo Botev" - Pleven
- 1st Army - Sofia
  - 98th Army Signals Regiment - Sofia (Sukhodol suburb)
  - 3rd Motor Rifle Division - Blagoevgrad
  - 17th Motor Rifle Division - Haskovo (previously under 2nd Army)
  - 9th Tank Brigade - Sofia (Gorna Banya suburb)
  - 1st Territorial Training Center - Sofia (previously the 1st MRD (bg:Първа мотострелкова дивизия), deploys back into MRD in wartime)
  - 21st Territorial Training Center - Pazardzhik (previously the 21st MRD, deploys back into MRD in wartime)
  - 46th Army Ballistic Missile Brigade - Samokov
  - 129th Army Field Missile Technical Base - Marino Pole (previously under 2nd Army, the 1st Army's own 128th AFMTB was disbanded, along with the 2nd Army's 56th Army Ballistic Missile Brigade, which the 129th AFMTB previously supported. The ballistic forces of the armies went from 3 brigades (46th, 56th and 66th) of 8 R-300 launchers each to 2 brigades (46th and 66th) of 12 launchers each).
  - 5th Army Artillery Regiment - Samokov
  - 35th Army Anti-Tank Regiment - Samoranovo and Dupnitsa (until 1990 the town's name is Stanke Dimitrov)
  - 9th Army Anti-Aircraft Artillery Regiment - Samoranovo
  - 88th Army Engineer Regiment - Kyustendil
  - ? Army Pontoon and Bridging Battalion - Kyustendil
  - 1st Army Parachute Reconnaissance Battalion - Sofia (Gorna Banya suburb)
  - 1st Army Radiotechnical [airspace surveillance] Battalion - Sofia
  - 1st Army Chemical Defence Battalion - Dupnitsa (until 1990 the town's name is Stanke Dimitrov)
  - 85th Army Separate Electronic Warfare Battalion type "N"
  - 120th Army Materiel Supply Brigade - Sofia
  - 1st Army Repair and Overhaul Brigade - Sofia
  - Military Hospital Stanke Dimitrov - Dupnitsa (until 1990 the town's name is Stanke Dimitrov)
  - various support units
- 2nd Army - Plovdiv (combat units dramatically reduced, combat and combat service support units mostly retained)
  - 95th Army Signals Regiment - Plovdiv
  - 5th Tank Brigade - Kazanlak
  - 104th Training Tank Regiment - Asenovgrad
  - 4th Army Artillery Regiment - Asenovgrad
  - 60th Army Engineer Regiment - Peshtera
  - 2nd Army Parachute Reconnaissance Battalion - Plovdiv
  - 2nd Army Radiotechnical [airspace surveillance] Battalion - Plovdiv
  - 91st Army Chemical Defence Battalion - Plovdiv
  - 83rd Army Separate Electronic Warfare Battalion type "N"
  - 120th Army Materiel Supply Brigade - Plovdiv
  - 2nd Army Repair and Overhaul Brigade - Plovdiv
  - Military Hospital Plovdiv - Plovdiv
  - various support units
- 3rd Army - Sliven
  - 6th Army Signals Regiment - Sliven
  - 2nd Motor Rifle Division - Stara Zagora
  - 7th Motor Rifle Division - Yambol
  - 13th Tank Brigade - Sliven
  - 24th Tank Brigade - Aytos
  - 16th Territorial Training Center - Burgas (previously the 16th MRD, deploys back into MRD in wartime)
  - 18th Territorial Training Center - Shumen (previously the 18th MRD, deploys back into MRD in wartime)
  - 66th Army Ballistic Missile Brigade - Kabile (near Yambol)
  - 130th Army Field Missile Technical Base - Kabile (near Yambol)
  - 45th Army Artillery Brigade - Targovishte
  - 55th Army Mixed Anti Tank Artillery Regiment - Karnobat
  - 34th Army Anti Aircraft Artillery Regiment - Sliven
  - 26th Army Engineer Regiment - Sotirya (near Sliven)
  - 37th Army Pontoon and Bridging Battalion - Sliven
  - 3rd Army Parachute Reconnaissance Battalion - Barshen airfield (Sliven)
  - 3rd Army Radiotechnical [airspace surveillance] Battalion - Gorska Polyana (near Yambol)
  - 70th Army Chemical Defence Battalion - Ablanovo
  - 84th Army Separate Electronic Warfare Battalion type "N"
  - 130th Army Materiel Supply Brigade - Sliven
  - 3rd Army Repair and Overhaul Brigade - Sliven
  - Military Hospital Sliven - Sliven
  - various support units

At the end of 1990 the Ground Forces' combat formations included 4 combat-ready motor rifle divisions (the 2nd, 3rd, 7th and 17th), 4 combat-ready tank brigades (5th, 9th, 13th and 24th), 4 territorial training centers active during peacetime to convert to motor rifle divisions during wartime (1st, 16th, 18th and 21st) and 2 motor rifle divisions to activate in case of war (15th MRD based on the People's School for Reserve Officers in Pleven and the 68th based on the People's Higher Military School in Veliko Tarnovo). This army structure was the starting point for the reforms that followed in the 1990s.

The first big change in the force structure was the result of the end of the Cold War. The war plans of the Bulgarian People's Army were fully in line with the understanding of the BPA as part of the Warsaw Pact. The anticipated war was a massive conflict between NATO and the Warsaw Pact, which the BPA would fight with the support its WP allies - the Soviet Army and the Romanian People's Army. The whole of North Bulgaria was the rear area of the planned Balkan Front and the combat formations were concentrated mostly against Turkey and Greece. With the dissolution of the Warsaw Pact the alliance between Bulgaria and Romania was nullified. Combined with the outbreak of the Yugoslav Wars this meant that the country had to plan for defence in all directions, while the difficult economic situation meant, that it could no longer maintain the big military budget of the previous period. So in 1992 a new Concept for the Development of the Bulgarian Army Until the Year 2000 (to be implemented in three phases, the re-structuring of the formations and units was to occur during the first (between 1995 and 1997) and second phases (between 1997 and 2000), while the third beyond the target date had focus on the modernisation of the armament and equipment). In the same year 1992 the decision to downgrade 2nd Army from a peacetime combat-ready formation like the 1st and 3rd Armies to a mainly training formation was reverted and the 17th Motor Rifle Division returned to being subordinated to it from the 3rd Army.

On September 1, 1994 (ahead of the planned start in 1995) the Ground Forces commenced with the implementation of the "corps-brigade" force model, but the catastrophic economic conditions and the chronic lack of finances thwarted these efforts. A new revised concept was put together in 1995–96. The GF was to transition from an "army - division - regiment - battalion" model to a mixed model. The three armies were to convert to the 1st, 2nd and 3rd Army Corps respectively, while two mechanised divisions were to be fielded in Northern Bulgaria - the 15th in Pleven and the 18th in Shumen. Each army corps was planned to have 1 or 2 tank brigades and 3 or 4 mechanised brigades, while the two mechanised divisions were to have three mechanised brigades each to a total of 17 mechanised, 4 tank and 1 separate mountain brigades, 3 ballistic missile brigades, 3 artillery brigades and 3 artillery regiments. At the battalion level the total was 69 mechanised, 47 tank and 77 artillery battalions of various types (self-propelled and towed gun and howitzer, anti-tank, ballistic missile, MLRS and ATGM). Peacetime manpower was set at 51 852 people (out of a total of ca. 90 000 for the entire Bulgarian Army). In case of war the country planned to field Ground Forces of 250 000.

The combat brigades were also put in five readiness categories - A, B, V, G (first four letters of the Cyrillic alphabet - А, Б, В, Г) and Tank.

- category A, over 70% of personnel assigned during peacetime - 24th Mechanised Brigade in Karlovo (highest combat readiness, secondary task to generate contingents for missions overseas)
- category B, 32% - 38% of personnel assigned during peacetime - 11th Mechanised Brigade in Slivnitsa, 13th in Blagoevgrad, 23rd in Harmanli and 31st in Yambol
- category V, 12% - 29% of personnel assigned during peacetime - 14th Mechanised Brigade in Bansko, 16th in Vratsa, 22nd in Haskovo, 32nd in Burgas and 41st in Dobrich
- category G, the four training and the three wartime mobilisation brigades - 12th (Trng) Mechanised Brigade in Dupnitsa, 21st (Trng) in Pazardzhik, 33rd (Trng) in Stara Zagora, 42nd (Trng) in Razgrad, 17th (Mob) in Pleven, 19th (Mob) also in Pleven and the 43rd (Mob) in Shumen
- Tank, 34% - 41% of personnel assigned during peacetime - 1st (former 9th) Tank Brigade in Sofia (Gorna Banya), 2nd (former 5th) in Kazanlak, 3rd (former 13th) in Sliven and 4th (former 24th) in Aytos.

These formations were assigned to the following force structure:

Main Staff of the Land Forces (Sofia) (Land Forces Command until January 1, 1996), converts to Field Army Headquarters in case of war

- 61st Signals Regiment - Nova Zagora
- 15th Mechanised Division (Pleven):
  - 16th Mechanised Brigade (Vratsa), cat. V
  - 17th Mechanised Brigade (Pleven), cat. G (Mob)
  - 19th Mechanised Brigade (Pleven), cat. G (Mob)
- 18th Mechanised Division (Shumen):
  - 41st Mechanised Brigade (Dobrich), cat. V
  - 42nd Mechanised Brigade (Razgrad), cat. G (Trng)
  - 43rd Mechanised Brigade (Shumen), cat. G (Mob)
- 61st Artillery Brigade (Targovishte)
- 61st Heavy Howitzer Artillery Brigade (Shumen)
- 61st Rocket Artillery Brigade (Asenovgrad)
- 76th Ballistic Missile Brigade (Telish), R-400 Oka
- Central Missile Technical Base (Lovech)
- 61st Missile Air Defence Brigade (Stara Zagora)
- 61st Missile Air Defence Technical Base (Shivachevo) (supports the 61st MADB and its Krug missile system)
- 61st Missile Air Defence Regiment (Nova Zagora)
- 61st Engineer Regiment (Svishtov)
- 61st Nuclear, Chemical, Biological Defence and Ecology Regiment (Gorna Oryahovitsa)
- 1st Army Corps (Sofia) (1st Army until June 26, 1996)
  - 11th Mechanised Brigade (Slivnitsa), cat. B
  - 12th Mechanised Brigade (Dupnitsa), cat. G (Trng)
  - 13th Mechanised Brigade (Blagoevgrad), cat. B
  - 14th Mechanised Brigade (Bansko), cat. V
  - 1st Tank Brigade (Sofia - Gorna Banya), cat. Tank
  - 1st Corps Ballistic Missile Brigade (Samokov), R-300 Aerofan
  - 11th Corps Field Missile Technical Base (Marino Pole)
  - 101st Corps Ballistic Missile Battalion (Samokov), OTR-21 Tochka
- 2nd Army Corps (Plovdiv) (2nd Army until August 31, 1996)
  - 21st Mechanised Brigade (Pazardzhik), cat. G (Trng)
  - 22nd Mechanised Brigade (Haskovo), cat. V
  - 23rd Mechanised Brigade (Harmanli), cat. B
  - 24th Mechanised Brigade (Karlovo), cat. A
  - 2nd Tank Brigade (Kazanlak), cat. Tank
  - 201st Corps Ballistic Missile Battalion (Stara Zagora), OTR-21 Tochka
- 3rd Army Corps (Sliven) (3rd Army until January 1, 1996)
  - 31st Mechanised Brigade (Yambol), cat. B
  - 32nd Mechanised Brigade (Burgas), cat. V
  - 33rd Mechanised Brigade (Stara Zagora), cat. G (Trng)
  - 3rd Tank Brigade (Sliven), cat. Tank
  - 4th Tank Brigade (Aytos), cat. Tank
  - 3rd Corps Ballistic Missile Brigade (Kabile), R-300 Aerofan
  - 3rd Corps Field Missile Technical Base (Kabile)
  - 301st Corps Ballistic Missile Battalion (Kabile), OTR-21 Tochka-U

In the 1996-97 period the force concept was changed again. The Land Forces were to be composed of two army corps (1st and 3rd Army Corps), Quick Reaction Forces (the former 2nd Army Corps), two mechanised divisions (15th and 18th) and combat, combat support and combat service support formations and units subordinated to the Main Staff of the LF:

1st Army Corps had the task to defend the state border from Kom Peak through Tumba Peak to Zlatograd. 3rd Army Corps had the border from Zlatograd to Cape Emine under its responsibility. 15th Mechanised Division covered the state border from Kom Peak, through the Timok river to the town of Svishtov. The 18th Mechanised Division closed the circle with the task to defend the border from Svishtov to Cape Emine. Each army corps was to be composed of 3 - 4 mechanised brigades, 1 - 2 tank brigades, 2 mixed artillery brigades (1 active in peacetime), a separate ballistic missile battalion and a separate artillery reconnaissance battalion, anti-air artillery brigade, anti-tank regiments (2 in 1st Army Corps, a single one in 3rd Army Corps), an engineer / line of communications regiment, an electronic warfare battalion, 2 nuclear, chemical, biological defence and ecology battalions (1 active in peacetime) and various signals, topographic, logistical and medical units. Each mechanised division was to be composed of 2 mechanised brigades, an artillery regiment, an anti-air artillery regiment, anti-tank, reconnaissance, combat engineer, NCBDE and a signals battalions.

Directly subordinated to the Main Staff of the Land Forces were two ballistic missile brigades, anti-tank brigade, missile air defence brigade, combat engineer brigade and other engineer units, NCBDE brigade, airborne reconnaissance and direct action regiment, electronic warfare regiment, PsyOps battalion, two UAV air squadrons and other support units.

All in all the combat formations and units in this force structure amounted to 13 mechanised, 1 light infantry and 4 tank brigades, a separate mountain infantry regiment and a separate mechanised battalion. This force structure had an implementation deadline until September 1, 2000, and leaned on a personnel requirement of 5 880 officers, 8 463 NCOs and ca. 20 000 ranks to a grand total of 34 342 personnel in the land forces.

=== On the path towards NATO ===
After the severe economic crisis during the Videnov Government (overthrown by mass protests) the country took a path of European integration and economic recovery. It set up the goals to become a member of NATO and the European Union. The reduction of the armed forces continued with the center pieces of the defence policy being close co-operation with NATO members and candidate states, divestment of labor-intensive systems, such as the ballistic missile systems of the land forces and the coastal anti-ship missile systems of the Navy, as well as transforming the operational units of the Land Forces into smaller, more nimble and flexible formations. The force structure in 2002 was the following:

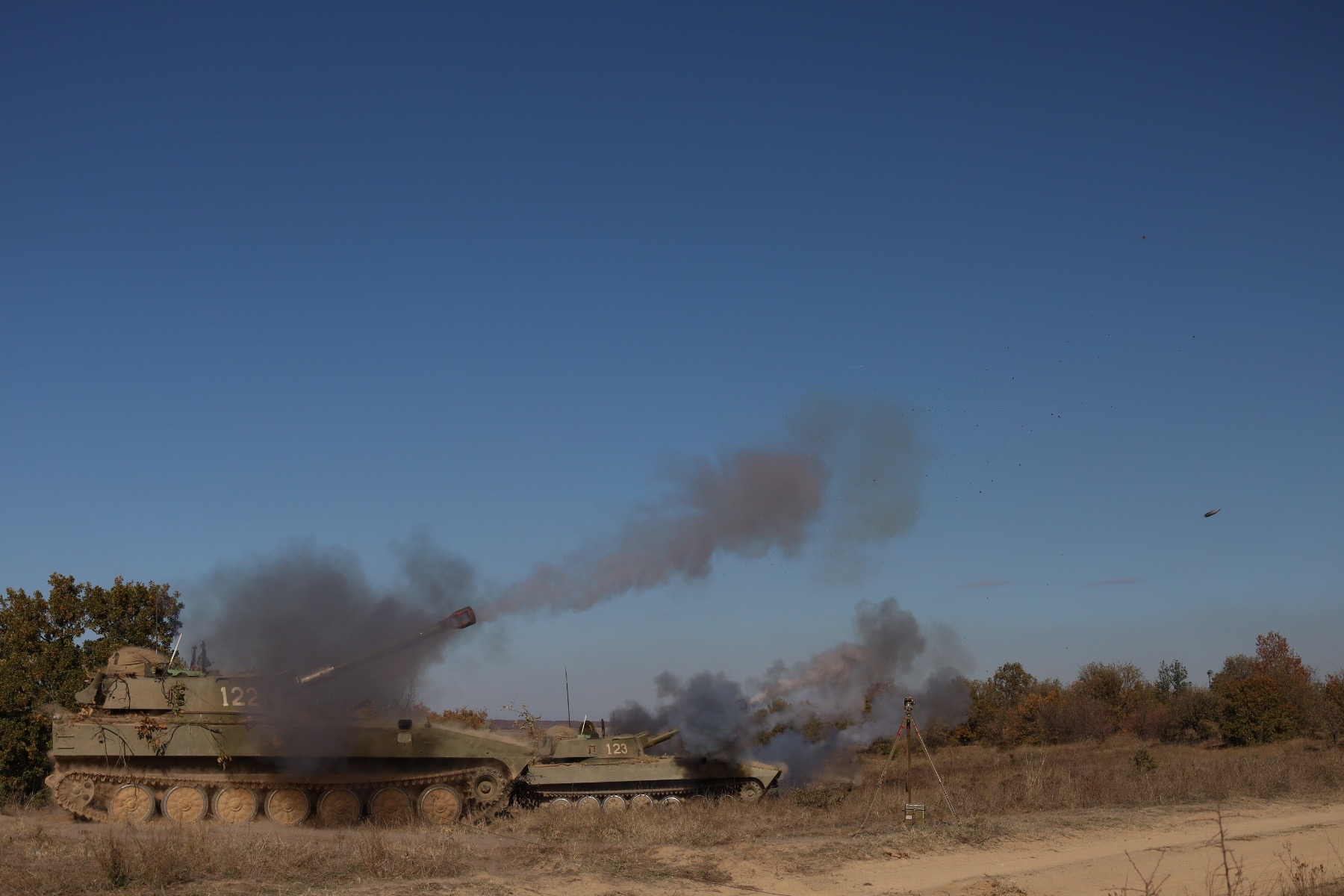
Bulgarian 2S1 Howitzers firing during an exercise

Main Staff of the Land Forces (Sofia)

- units, directly subordinated to the MSLF (4 751 people)
  - Staff Battalion (Sofia)
  - 65th Signals Regiment (Nova Zagora)
  - 66th MLRS Brigade (Kabile)
  - 24th Missile Air Defence Brigade (Nova Zagora)
  - 55th Engineer and Sapper Brigade (Belene)
  - 78th Pontoon and Bridging Regiment (Stara Zagora)
  - 91st Fortification Engineer Regiment (Plovdiv)
  - 1st Armored Reconnaissance Regiment (Svoboda)
  - 15th Electronic Warfare Regiment (Gorna Oryahovitsa)
  - 38th Nuclear, Chemical, Biological Defence and Ecology Regiment (Musachevo)
  - 59th Nuclear, Chemical, Biological Defence and Ecology Regiment (Gorna Oryahovitsa)
- 2nd Army Corps (rapid reaction forces, 9 268 people)
  - 95th Signals Regiment (Plovdiv)
  - 5th Mechanised Brigade (Kazanlak)
  - 61st Mechanised Brigade (Karlovo)
  - 2nd Light Infantry Brigade (Stara Zagora)
  - 4th Mixed Artillery Brigade (Asenovgrad)
  - 2nd Anti-Tank Battalion (possibly also in Asenovgrad)
  - 110th Material Support Brigade (Plovdiv)
- 1st Corps Reserve Command (3 421 people)
  - 98th Corps Signals Regiment (Sofia - Suhodol)
  - 9th Armored Brigade (Sofia - Gorna Banya) (active)
  - 3rd Brigade Reserve Command (Blagoevgrad)
    - 14th Separate Mechanised Battalion (Bansko)
    - 32nd Cover and Territorial Defence Regiment (Kyustendil)
  - 8th Brigade Reserve Command (Vratsa)
    - 10th Separate Mechanised Battalion (Vratsa)
    - 10th Cover and Territorial Defence Regiment (most likely also Vratsa)
  - 5th Artillery Reserve Brigade Command (Samokov)
  - 101st Mountain Infantry Regiment (Smolyan)
  - 5th Cover and Territorial Defence Regiment (either Slivnitsa or Sofia - Gorna Banya)
  - 21st Cover and Territorial Defence Regiment (Pazardzhik)
  - 28th Cover and Territorial Defence Regiment (Gotse Delchev)
  - Corps Training Range Slivnitsa
- 3rd Corps Reserve Command (4 121 people)
  - 6th Corps Signals Regiment (Sliven)
  - 13th Armored Brigade (Sliven) (active)
  - 7th Brigade Reserve Command (Yambol)
    - 42nd Separate Mechanised Battalion (Yambol)
    - 12th Cover and Territorial Defence Regiment (Elhovo)
  - 17th Brigade Reserve Command (Haskovo)
    - 31st Separate Mechanised Battalion (Haskovo)
    - 22nd Cover and Territorial Defence Regiment (Harmanli)
  - 18th Brigade Reserve Command (Shumen)
    - 29th Separate Mechanised Battalion (Shumen)
    - 45th Cover and Territorial Defence Regiment (Dobrich)
  - 34th Mountain Infantry Regiment (Momchilgrad)
  - 45th Artillery Reserve Brigade Command (Targovishte)
  - 24th Cover and Territorial Defence Regiment (Aytos)
  - Corps Training Range Novo Selo
- Special Operations Forces Command (1 324 people)
  - 68th Special Forces Brigade (Plovdiv)
  - 1st Parachute Reconnaissance Regiment (Sliven)
  - 1st Psychological Operations Battalion (Karlovo, later relocated to the Sofia suburb of Suhodol)

In case of war the 1st and 3rd Corps Reserve Commands mobilise into 1st and 3rd Army Corps, the 2nd Army Corps transforms into the Operational Forces Command.

== Organization ==
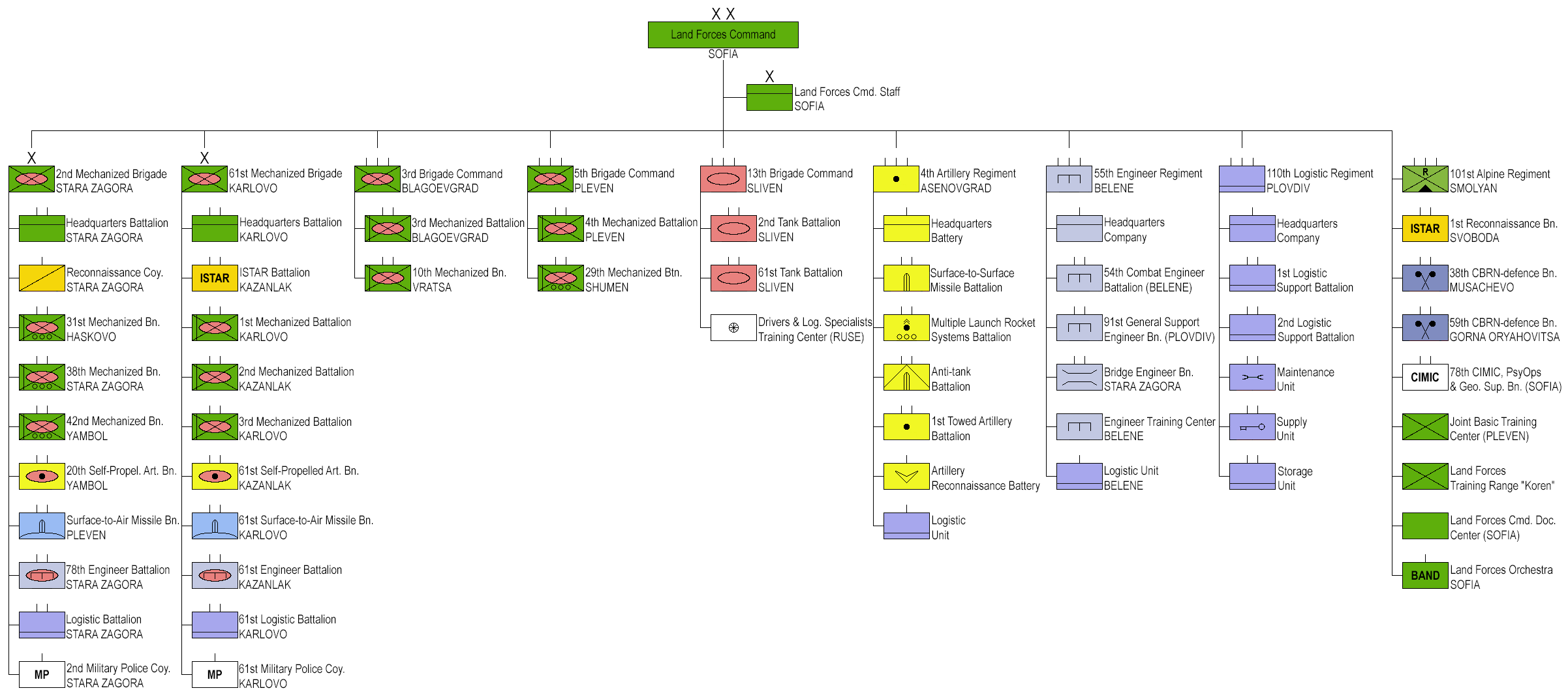
Bulgarian Land Forces organization 2025 (click to enlarge)

Bulgarian Land Forces locations 2025

61 Mechanized Brigade Emblem

110 Logistic Regiment Emblem

55 Engineer Regiment Emblem

- Land Forces Command, in Sofia
  - Communications and Information Support Battalion, in Sofia
  - 2nd Tundzhanska Mechanized Brigade, in Stara Zagora
    - Headquarters Battalion, in Stara Zagora
    - 31st Mechanized Battalion, in Haskovo
    - 38th Mechanized Battalion, in Stara Zagora
    - 42nd Mechanized Battalion, in Yambol
    - 20th Self-Propelled Artillery Battalion, in Yambol
    - Surface-to-Air Missile Battalion, in Pleven, armed with Osa-AKM
    - Forces Protection Battalion of 2nd MBde, in Stara Zagora (includes an NBC Defence and Ecology company)
    - Reconnaissance Company, in Stara Zagora
    - Logistics Battalion, in Stara Zagora
    - 2nd Military Police Company, in Stara Zagora
  - 61st Stryamska Mechanized Brigade, in Karlovo
    - Headquarters Battalion, in Karlovo
    - 1st Mechanized Battalion, in Karlovo
    - 2nd Mechanized Battalion, in Kazanlak
    - 3rd Mechanized Battalion, in Karlovo
    - ISTAR Battalion, Kazanlak
    - 61st Self-Propelled Artillery Battalion, in Kazanlak
    - 61st Surface-to-Air Missile Battalion, in Kazanlak, armed with Osa-AKM
    - Forces Protection Battalion of 61st MBde, Kazanlak (includes an NBC Defence and Ecology company)
    - 61st Logistics Battalion, in Karlovo
    - 61st Military Police Company, in Karlovo
  - 3rd Brigade Command, Blagoevgrad
    - 3rd Mechanized Battalion, in Blagoevgrad
    - 10th Mechanized Battalion, in Vratsa
  - 5th Brigade Command, in Pleven (former Joint Center for Initial Training, previously 5th Shipchenska Mechanised Brigade)
    - 4th Mechanized Battalion, in Pleven
    - 29th Mechanized Battalion, in Shumen
  - 13th Brigade Command, in Sliven (until 1 June 2025: Specialists Training Center for Armored Troops, previously 13th Slivenska Tank Brigade)
    - 2nd Tank Battalion
    - 61st Tank Battalion
    - Drivers and Logistic Specialists Training Center, in Ruse (trains logisticians and drivers of BTR, BRDM, Guardian and Stryker for the combat units)
  - 101st Alpine Regiment, Smolyan – the 68th Special Forces Brigade was transferred from the Land Forces to the Chief of Defence on 1 February 2017. 101st Mountain Battalion detached from it and retained its place within the Land Forces to become their special operations unit with an upgrade to regiment.
  - 4th Artillery Regiment, in Asenovgrad
    - Headquarters Battery
    - 1st Towed Artillery Battalion
    - Tactical Surface-to-Surface Missile Battalion
    - Multiple Launch Rocket Systems Battalion
    - Anti-Tank Battalion
    - Artillery Reconnaissance Battery
    - Logistics Unit
  - 55th Engineer Regiment, in Belene
    - Headquarters Company, in Belene
    - 54th Combat Engineer Battalion, in Belene
    - 91st General Support Engineer Battalion, in Plovdiv
    - Bridge Construction Engineer Battalion, in Stara Zagora
    - Engineer Training Center, in Belene
    - Logistics Unit, in Belene
  - 110th Logistic Regiment, in Plovdiv
    - Headquarters Company, in Plovdiv
    - 1st Logistics Support Battalion, attached to the 61st Mechanized Brigade
    - 2nd Logistics Support Battalion, attached to the 2nd Mechanized Brigade
    - additional support battalions (repair, supply and storage units)
  - 1st Reconnaissance (ISTAR) Battalion, in Svoboda
  - 38th NBC Defence and Ecology Battalion, in Musachevo
  - 78th CIMIC, PsyOps & Geographic Support Battalion, in Sofia
  - Land Forces Command Documentation Support Center, in Sofia
  - Joint Center for Basic Training, in Pleven
  - Land Forces Training Range "Koren"

The 61st Mechanised Brigade is earmarked for deployment with the Greek NATO Rapid Deployment Corps for exercises, emergencies and for actions alongside NATO. For that reason the corps has a Bulgarian major-general as a deputy commander. In addition to its training tasks the Specialists Training Center, Sliven, is the storage facility of the operational reserve of 160 T-72M1 tanks and many other armoured vehicles.

The plan for the mechanised brigades is for each of them to have three battalion battlegroups. Although the first three battalion battlegroups are already formed the MoD disclosed very little information about their actual structure. What little is known is, that each of them will have three rifle companies and integral fire and engineer support (including EOD disposal). In addition to that, according to the modular principal of actions the structure is optimised to easily integrate additional supporting units tailored to the actual mission, such as tanks, self-propelled artillery, self-propelled missile air defence units, special forces, heavy engineering, CIMIC etc. Contingency plans envision, that one of the brigades will be fully ready to deploy entirely for operations overseas, while the other, alongside the new Mountain Infantry Regiment, assumes the armed forces' paramount mission of defending the territorial integrity of the country.

== Ranks ==
=== Commissioned officer ranks ===
The rank insignia of commissioned officers.

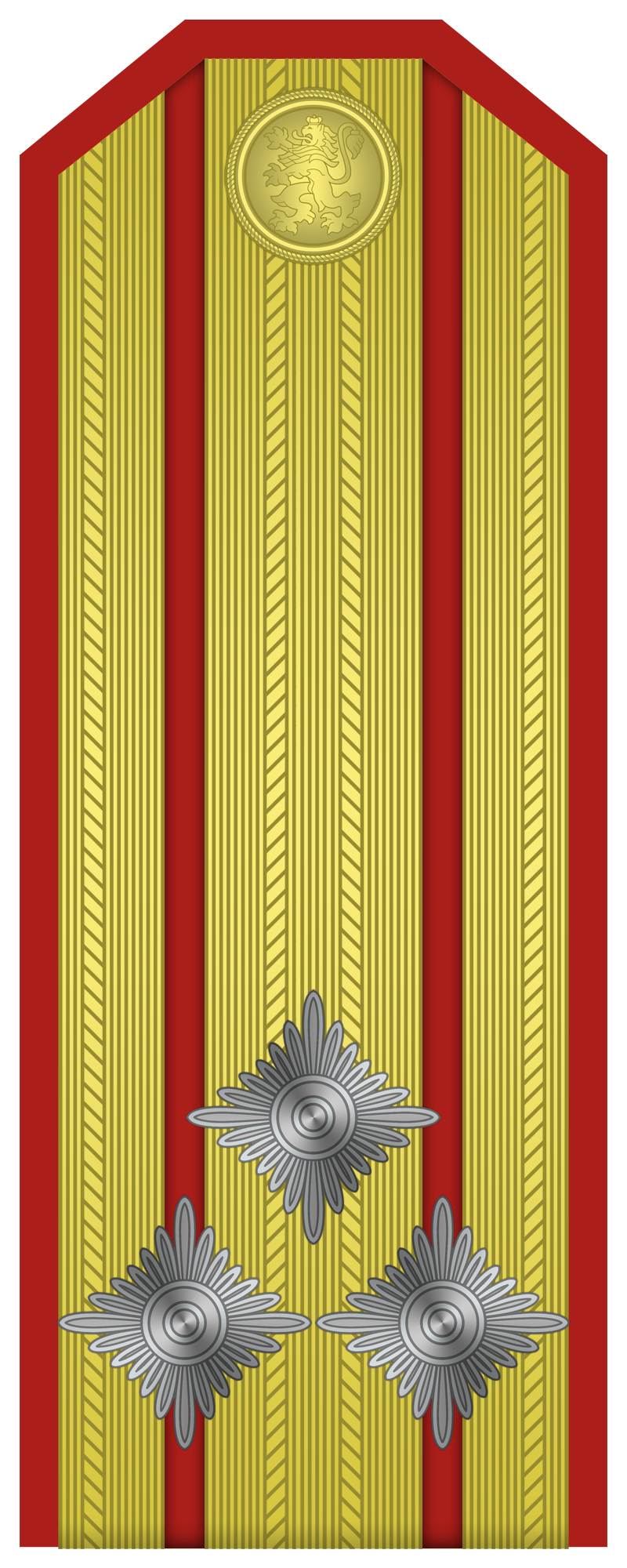
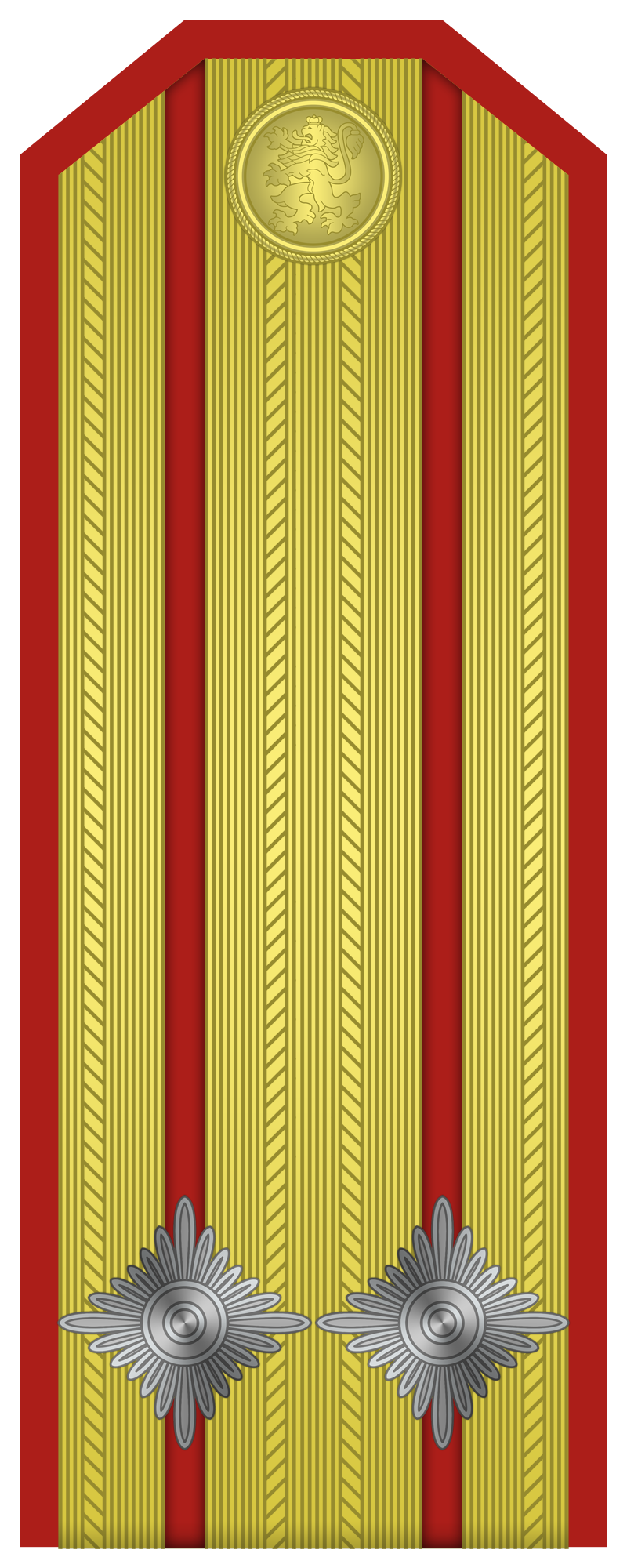
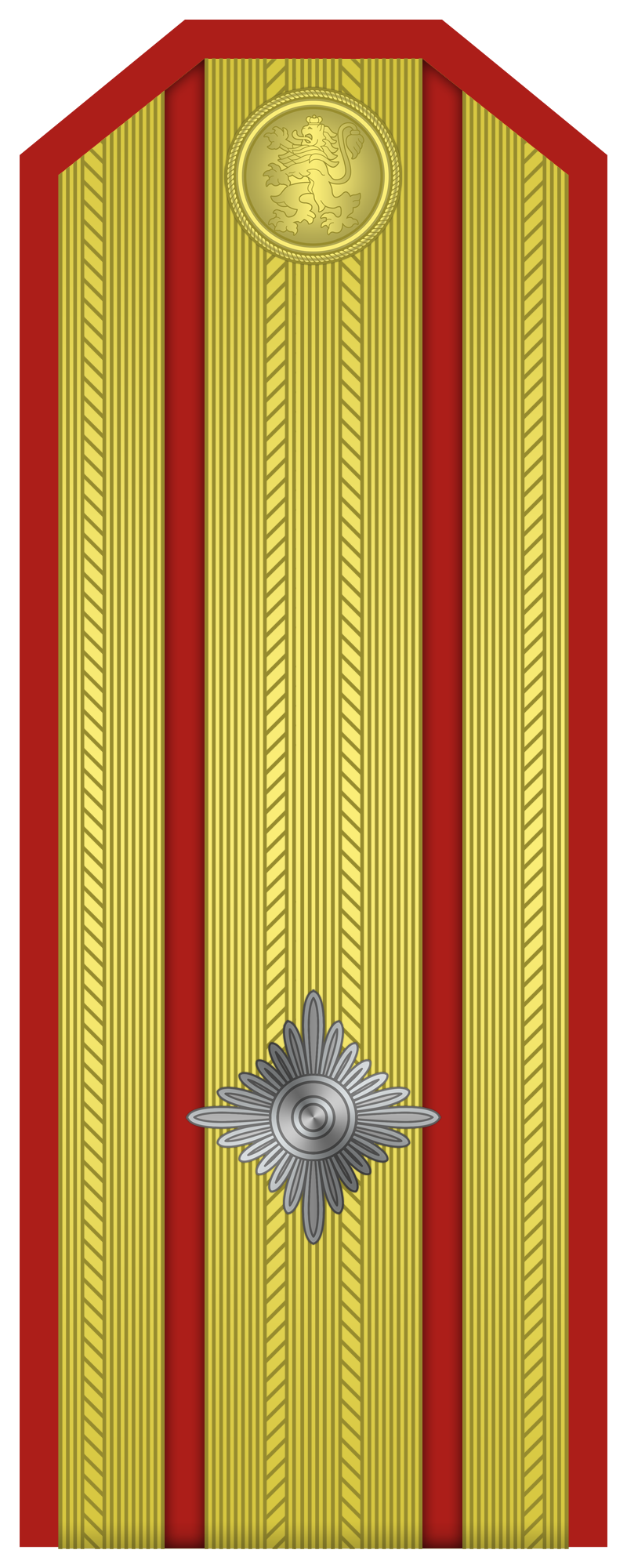
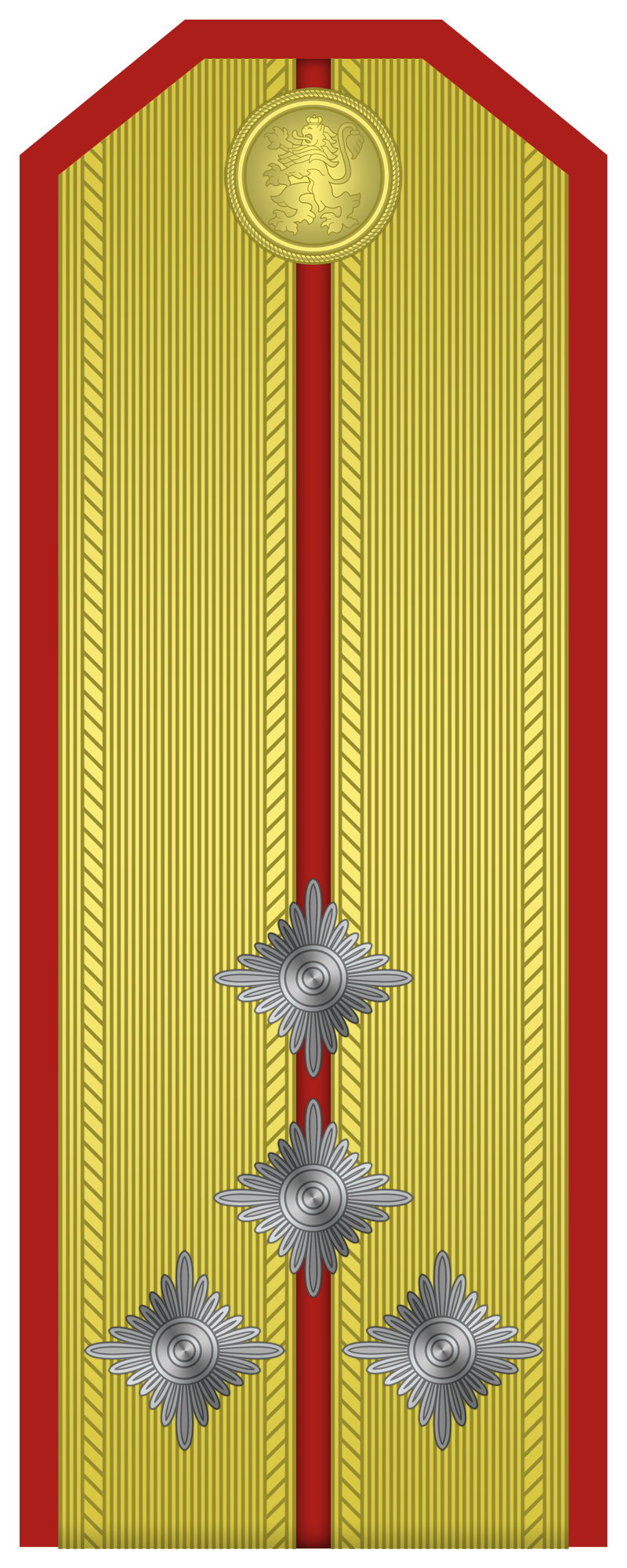
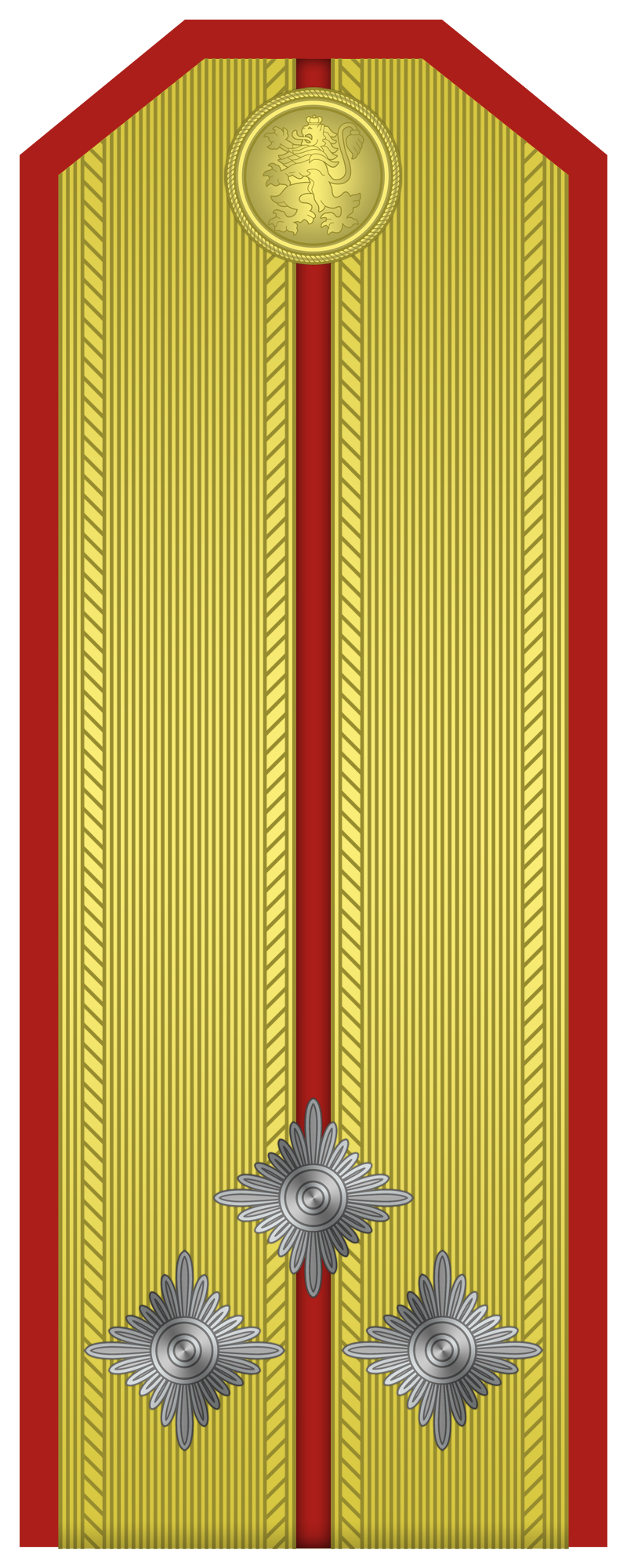
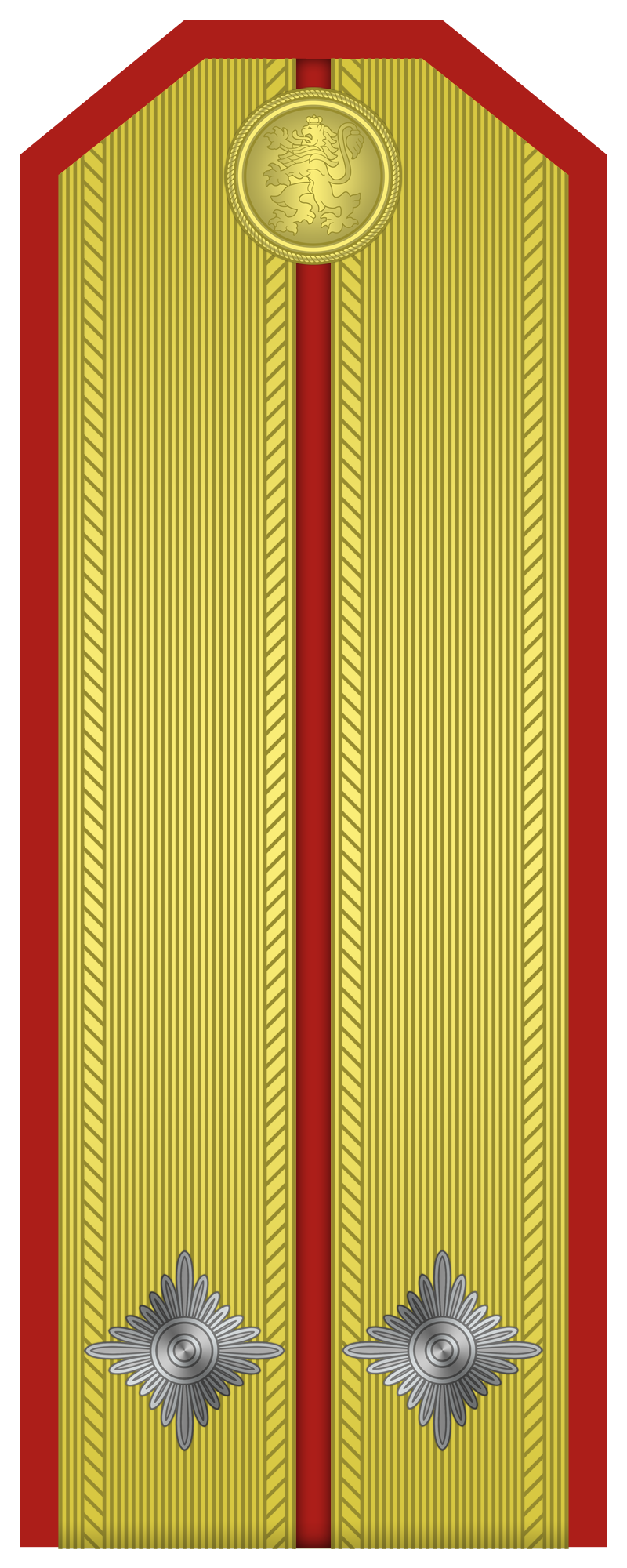
NATO code	OF-10	OF-9	OF-8	OF-7	OF-6	OF-5	OF-4	OF-3	OF-2	OF-1
Bulgarian Land Forces
Bulgarian Land Forces		Генерал; General	Генерал-лейтенант; General-leytenant	Генерал-майор; General-mayor	Бригаден генерал Brigaden general	Полковник; Polkovnik	Подполковник; Podpolkovnik	Майор; Mayor	Капитан; Kapitan	Старши лейтенант Starshi leytenant	Лейтенант; Leytenant

=== Other ranks ===
The rank insignia of non-commissioned officers and enlisted personnel.

NATO code	OR-9	OR-8	OR-7	OR-6	OR-5	OR-4	OR-3	OR-2	OR-1
Bulgarian Land Forces
Bulgarian Land Forces	Офицерски кандидат Ofitserski kandidat	Старшина; Starshyna	Старши сержант Starshi serzhant	Сержант; Serzhant	Младши сержант Mladshi serzhant	Ефрейтор; Efreytor	Редник; Rednik

== Sources ==
- Robinson, Dr. Colin (6 October 2023). "The Bulgarian Land Forces in the Cold War". Bulletin of "Carol I" National Defence University. 12 (3): 73–94. doi:10.53477/2284-9378-23-33. ISSN 2284-9378. S2CID 263840467.
- Hall, Richard C. (2000). The Balkan Wars, 1912–1913: Prelude to the First World War. Routledge. ISBN 0-415-22946-4.
- Knopp, Guido (2009). Die Wehrmacht – Eine Bilanz (in German). Goldmann. ISBN 978-3-442-15561-3.
- Mazower, Mark (1995). Inside Hitler's Greece: The Experience of Occupation, 1941–44. Yale University Press. ISBN 0-300-08923-6.
- Miller, Marshall Lee (1975). Bulgaria during the Second World War. Stanford University Press. ISBN 978-0-8047-0870-8.
- Gordon L. Rottman and Ron Volstad (1987). Warsaw Pact Ground Forces. London: Osprey Publishing. (for further reading)
