= Balkan Front =

Balkan Front may refer to:

- Balkan Front (World War I), a theatre of World War I fought between the Central Powers and the Allies
- Balkan Front (Bulgarian People's Army), a military formation of the Bulgarian People's Army

== See also ==
- Balkans campaign
