= Balkan Front (Bulgarian People's Army) =

The Balkan Front was a military formation of the Bulgarian People's Army, intended for wartime use under the general direction of the Soviet General Staff. If a war was to have broken out between NATO and the Warsaw Pact, the bulk of the Bulgarian army would have been assigned to it.

In case of war the Bulgarian People's Army's Land Forces Command would have formed the 1st Balkan Front with the three Bulgarian armies and wartime reinforcements. Additional Soviet units would also come under its command (particularly 10th Army of the Soviet Union (10th Air Army?), planned to deploy between the fifth and tenth day after a full mobilization in the area between Silistra, Tolbukhin, Varna and Omurtag)

== Purpose ==
Colonel-General Hristo Dobrev, the first commander of the Land Forces Command (the peacetime organisation, which would transform into the Balkan Front in case of war) gave the following reasons for its formation:

"It is well established, that according to the operational plans of the Warsaw Pact's Joint Forces High Command, our country should have formed a front operational-strategic formation, including the main forces of the BPA. In case of an armed aggression this front should have organised defensive operations along the southern border and provide the cover for the deployment of one Soviet and one Romanian front, after which the combined forces of the three fronts with the support of the Soviet Strategic Missile Forces and the Combined Black Sea Fleet were to execute counter-offensive operations for the destruction of the aggressor.

These plans have been rehearsed in several strategic command and staff exercises under the command of the Supreme Commander of the Unified Armed Forces of the Warsaw Treaty Organization and the [Bulgarian] Minister of People's Defence. Initially the command of the front was formed following the "emission" method - dispatching personnel from the General Staff and the departments of the Ministry of People's Defence [on an ad hoc basis].

There is hardly any need to proove, that this means to form the Front Command suffered from significant flaws. In its comprehensive form it only existed for the duration of massive operational-strategic exercises. That hindered its training and manpower recruitment. The personnel of the front command was always different from one formation to another. The chiefs of departments within the MPO and the General Staff were disincentivized to dispatch their best subordinates to the FC, knowing that this meant, that in case of war their departments would lose that personnel. In these circumstance the FC was unable to mobilise and interact with the headquarters of its subordinated armies, formations and the units in its direct subordination [in a meaningful way].

Taking these shortages into account already in 1963 the Minister decided, that a peacetime nucleus for the mobilization of the wartime Front Command should be formed. This has led to the birth of the Main Directorate for Preparedness of the Troops (Главно управление за подготовка на войските (ГУПВ)) It consisted of a command, staff, Political Directorate, commands of the various combat branches and an operational group of personnel from the BPA's logistical department and the MPO's Main Directorate for Weapons and Equipment. General Vrachev, until that moment First Deputy-Minister of People's Defence was appointed as its first chief and I, until then First Deputy-Chief of the General Staff, was appointed as its chief of staff.

In this form the MDPT has existed for two years. During that time it was responsible for the combat and mobilization readiness, operational and combat training of the Land Forces, training of staff personnel and participation in front-level exercises commanded by the Minister. The experience gained during its existence has unequivocally showed its usefulness as a model for the formation of a front command in peacetime, but nevertheless due to factors completely outside of operational considerations, the MDPT was disestablished in 1965 and for several years we made a step back to the old ad hoc practices for the formation of an FC, which were proven time and again to be ineffective.

During the years after 1965 our experience has convinced us in the necessity of having a permanent peacetime nucleus for the formation of a wartime front command. After long discussions and despite the objections of the General Staff, in the summer of 1973 the Collegium [leadership] of the Ministry of People's Defence has decided for the formation of the Land Forces Command (Командване на сухопътните войски (КСВ)) with two main tasks - to direct the complete preparedness and build-up of the land forces as a type of the armed forces and to prepare to transform into a front command in case of a war..."

According to Lieutenant-General Hristo Hristov (former Chief of the Land Forces and Chief of the Georgi Rakovski Military Academy): "For that purpose the Land Forces Command was formed in 1973. Its first chief was Colonel-General Hristo Dobrev, with the rank of Deputy Minister of People's Defence. At a conference about the organization of the armed forces of about ten years ago [around 2003] Lt.-Gen. Hristov described the need for the LFC as such:

"It is well known, that according to the operational plans of the Supreme Headquarters of the Warsaw Pact Organization our country was supposed to form a frontal Operational-Strategical Formation (фронтово оперативно-стратегическо обединение), mainly including the Bulgarian People's Army with the mission in case of an aggression launched against the People's Republic of Bulgaria to mount defensive action on the southern state border in order to secure the deployment on Bulgarian soil of additionally one Soviet and one Romanian front, after which with the support of the Soviet Strategic Missile Troops the three fronts were, with the support of the Soviet Black Sea Fleet [which at that point would have absorbed the Bulgarian and the Romanian Navies] to launch a strategic operation aimed at the total destruction of the aggressor... Our men were excellently trained. Our Land Forces at the moment [the 1970s] numbered around 60~62 000 men, the exercises were constant. Each division executed annually one winter and one summer exercise in full strength. The three army headquarters - one command exercise under the leadership of the respective army commander and one command exercise under the leadership of the Land Forces Main Staff annually. The massive exercises of the Land Forces, normally during the summers normally included an army headquarters from the Soviet Army and occasionally an army headquarters from the Romanian Army. On the Balkan operational direction our armed forces were planned to cooperate with them."

The headquarters of the 1st Balkan Front, at Sofia, would have had direct command of the following units and formations:

== Directly Subordinated ==
- Intelligence Directorate of the General Staff:
  - 68th Independent Parachute-Reconnaissance Regiment (Plovdiv, an equivalent of the Soviet GRU-Spetsnaz, the Intelligence Directorate even had a "Spetsnaz"-Department with that exact name and the responsibility for combat readiness and mission planning of the Specnaz units). The regiment was formed on October 1, 1975, by bringing together the battalion-sized 68th (in Plovdiv) and 86th Training Parachute-Reconnaissance Base (in Musachevo village, immediately to the east of Sofia. The bases, called "Training" (Учебна Парашутно-Разузнавателна База - Резерв на Главното Командване (УПРБ-РГК)) for maskirovka were special mission units, directly subordinated to the General Staff with the capabilities to execute covert intelligence gathering and direct actions deep in the enemy rear of the two NATO adversaries in the region - Greece and Turkey respectively. Each of the bases was composed of a Command, Staff, and Staff Services; 3 Para-Recon Companies of 6 Para-Recon Groups each (consisting of 7 people: a commanding officer, a master sergeant executive commander, a radiotelegraphist, a senior intelligence gatherer, an intelligence gatherer, an intelligence gatherer/ grenadier and a military interpreter); a Training Company, a Signals Company and diverse support and supply units. The newly formed 68th IPRR included a Command; Staff and Staff Services; 3 x Para-Recon Battalions; Diversionary-Reconnaissance Detachment (reinforced company, specialised in direct actions, upgraded to an entire battalion in 1989); Training Battalion; Signals Battalion and support and supply units. The full compliance to Soviet GRU-Spetsnaz standards since the formation of the regiment is also noted in the specification of the Para-Recon Groups, which were renamed Spetsnaz-Reconnaissance Groups (Разузнавателни Групи със Специално Назначение (РГСН)). The regiment is the forerunner of the modern 68th Special Forces Brigade.
  - ?. Independent Brigade for Radio-intercept and Radio-technical Reconnaissance OSNAZ (?. Отделната Бригада за Радио и Радиотехническо Разузнаване ОСНАЗ) in Musachevo, just to the east of Sofia (the ELINT and Radio Interception units of the BPA were called OSNAZ from the Russian ОСобое НАЗначение (roughly translated as "of specific purpose"), Electronic Warfare, such as the N, S and NS type units were called SPETSNAZ (same as the special forces units) from the Russian СПЕЦиальное НАЗначение (translated as "of special purpose"))
- Directorate for Signals and Electronics of the General Staff:
  - 62nd Signals Brigade (Bulgaria), in Gorna Malina - with the escalation in the nuclear armament of NATO and the Warsaw Pact a plan was devised by the Bulgarian government, that in the case of a full-sized conflict, to retain command and control, the higher echelon of the Bulgarian Communist Party and the senior military command was to be divided in three groups and evacuated to nuclear blast-protected bunkers in the Bulgarian mountains. Next to the functions of the Signals Regiment in the Sofia suburb of Suhodol, the brigade also maintained higher military communication lines. For that reason, the 62nd Brigade had at least three dispersed signals regiments for government communications, such as the 75th Signals Regiment (Lovech), the 65th Signals Regiment (Nova Zagora) and at least one additional unknown Signals Regiment in the Rila-Pirin mountain massif. The modern successor of the 62nd Signals Brigade is the Stationary Communication and Information System (Стационарна Комуникационна Информационна Система (СКИС)) of the Defence Staff (which fulfills also the tasks of Signals Intelligence and Cyber Defence next to its strategic communications mission) and the Mobile Communication and Information System (Мобилна Комуникационна Информационна Система (МКИС)) of the Joint Forces Command.
- Electronic Warfare Department (Отдел за Радиоелектронна Борба към Генералния Щаб (ОРЕБ-ГЩ)) (a General Staff department, headed by a Colonel)
  - Stationary Battalion for Radiojamming (Стационарен Батальон за Радиосмущения)
  - Unit for Radioelectronic Control (Отряд за Радиоелектронен Контрол) (The unit's task was to control the radioelectronic signature of the own forces and to manage their survivability against jamming by the enemy. U.S. DOD "electronic protection".)
  - Central Workshop (Централна Работилница)
  - several Signals intelligence units, including in Berkovitsa, Gorna Oryahovitsa, etc.
  - Higher Military Medical Institute, in Sofia (Висш Военно-Медицински Институт (ВВМИ)), the armed forces' medical service. The Director of the Higher Military Medical Institute was in charge of all BPA medical and recreational units and was also the armed forces' Surgeon-General.

== Land Forces ==
- Directly Subordinated
  - 76th Missile Brigade, in Telish, with 8x OTR-23 Oka ballistic missile launchers
  - 135th Front Mobile Missile-Technical Base, in Telish
  - 31st Frontal Anti-aircraft Missile Brigade, in Stara Zagora, with 3x anti-aircraft missile divisions armed with 2K11 Krug air defence systems
  - Electronic Warfare Service (Служба за Радиоелектронна Борба (Служба РЕБ)) (a General Staff department, headed by a Colonel)
    - Independent Frontal Electronic Warfare Battalion type "NS" (Отделен Фронтови Батальон за Радиоелектронна Борба тип "НС"), splits in wartime in
      - Independent Frontal Electronic Warfare Battalion type "N" (Отделен Фронтови Батальон за Радиоелектронна Борба тип "Н") (tasked to jam the enemy communications)
      - Independent Frontal Electronic Warfare Battalion type "S" (Отделен Фронтови Батальон за Радиоелектронна Борба тип "С") (tasked to jam the enemy's targeting systems and thus protect the own forces and locations from guided weapons)
  - 3rd Frontal Radio-technical Battalion, in Nova Zagora
  - 55th Pontoon Engineer Brigade, in Belene (tasked with ensuring that Romanian and Soviet reinforcements could cross the Danube)

The Bulgarian People's Army education institutions would have formed the following units in wartime:

- "Georgi Sava Rakovski" Military Academy, in Sofia - a motor rifle division
- "Vasil Levski" People's Higher Combined Arms School, in Veliko Tarnovo - a motor rifle division
- "Hristo Botev" Reserve Officers School, in Pleven - a motor rifle division (bg:Петнадесета мотострелкова дивизия)
- "Georgi Benkovski" People's Higher Air Force School, in Dolna Mitropoliya - a motor rifle division
- "Georgi Dimitrov" People's Artillery and Air Defence Forces School, in Shumen - a front artillery division and an anti-tank artillery brigade
  - 84th Front Artillery Division - Reserve of the High Command (84-та Фронтова Артилерийска Дивизия - Резерв на Главното Командване) - formed for the massive Shield-82 (Щит-82) exercise of the Warsaw Pact Organisation, after which put in cadre status. Each brigade included four fire divisions of 18 pieces each, for a total of 72 systems in each brigade.
    - Division HQ
    - 85th Mixed Artillery Brigade (85-а Смесена Артилерийска Бригада) (100-mm BS-3 guns and 122-mm 2А-19 guns)
    - 86th Heavy Howitzer Artillery Brigade (86-а Тежка Гаубична Артилерийска Бригада) (152-mm D-20 gun-howitzers)
    - 87th Howitzer Artillery Brigade (87-а Гаубична Артилерийска Бригада) (122-mm М-30 howitzers)
    - 89th Rocket Artillery Brigade (89-а Реактивна Артилерийска Бригада) (BM-21 "Grad" MLRS)
  - Destroyer Anti-Tank Artillery Brigade - Reserve of the High Command (Изтребителна Противотанкова Артилерийска Бригада - РГК (ИПТАБр - РГК))
    - Command; Staff; Command and Reconnaissance Battery; 5 DATA-divisions of 3 batteries of 6 MT-12 antitank guns and supporting units

Another Reserve Officers' Training School is also listed - bg:Осма мотострелкова дивизия.

== 1st Army ==
- 1st Army, in Sofia, with the strike direction of Yugoslavia and Greece
  - 1st Motor Rifle Division, in Slivnitsa. 1st Guards Rifle Division "Josef Stalin" 1950-60; 1st Motor Rifle Division 1960-onwards. (bg:Първа мотострелкова дивизия)
    - 3rd Motor Rifle Regiment, in Slivnitsa
    - 5th Motor Rifle Regiment, in Slivnitsa
    - 48th Motor Rifle Regiment, in Breznik
    - 65th Tank Regiment, in Botevgrad
    - 18th Artillery Regiment, in Bozhurishte
    - 37th Anti-aircraft Missile Regiment, in Slivnitsa
    - 1st Reconnaissance Battalion
    - 1st Anti-tank Artillery Division
    - 1st Missile Division, in Samokov
    - 1st Multiple Rocket Launch Artillery Division
    - 1st Engineer Battalion
    - 1st Signal Battalion, in Slivnitsa
    - 1st Transport Battalion
    - 1st Supply Battalion
    - 1st Maintenance Battalion
    - 1st Artillery Reconnaissance and Control Battery
    - 1st Chemical Defence Company
    - 1st Commandant's Company (Military Police)
    - 1st Divisional Detachment for Medical Support (Medical-Sanitary Battalion in wartime)
  - 3rd Motor Rifle Division, in Blagoevgrad
    - 14th Motor Rifle Regiment, in Simitli
    - 19th Motor Rifle Regiment, in Kresna and Sandanski)
    - 28th Motor Rifle Regiment, in Gotse Delchev
    - 11th Tank Regiment, in Bansko
    - 36th Artillery Regiment, in Razlog
    - 49th Anti-aircraft Missile Regiment, in Blagoevgrad
    - 3rd Reconnaissance Battalion
    - 3rd Self-propelled Field Artillery Division, in Bansko
    - 3rd Anti-tank Artillery Division, in Simitli
    - 3rd Missile Division, in Grudovo, in Razlog
    - 3rd Multiple Rocket Launch Artillery Division
    - 3rd Engineer Battalion
    - 3rd Signal Battalion
    - 3rd Transport Battalion
    - 3rd Supply Battalion
    - 3rd Maintenance Battalion
    - 3rd Artillery Reconnaissance and Control Battery
    - 3rd Chemical Defence Company
    - 3rd Commandant's Company (Military Police)
    - 3rd Divisional Detachment for Medical Support (Medical-Sanitary Battalion in wartime)
  - 21st Motor Rifle Division, in Pazardzhik (a training/reserve formation to be brought up to strength in times of war)
    - 30th Motor Rifle Regiment, in Pazardzhik
    - 101st Motor Rifle Regiment, in Smolyan
    - 102nd Motor Rifle Regiment, in Devin
    - 103rd Motor Rifle Regiment, in Ardino
    - 105th Artillery Regiment, in Smolyan
    - Anti-aircraft Missile Regiment
    - 21st Reconnaissance Battalion
    - 21st Anti-tank Artillery Division
    - 21st Missile Division, in Pazardzhik
    - 21st Multiple Rocket Launch Artillery Division
    - 21st Engineer Battalion
    - 21st Signal Battalion
    - 21st Transport Battalion
    - 21st Supply Battalion
    - 21st Maintenance Battalion
    - 21st Artillery Reconnaissance and Control Battery
    - 21st Chemical Defence Company
    - 21st Commandant's Company (Military Police)
    - 21st Divisional Detachment for Medical Support (Medical-Sanitary Battalion in wartime)
  - 9th Tank Brigade, in Gorna Banya, a suburb of Sofia - according to the memories of Colonel (Ret.) Yanko Roshkev, the brigade's commanding officer at the end of the 1980s and the beginning of the 1990s, the brigade had a special force structure, due to its immediate proximity to the country's capital. It had a total of 182 main battle tanks in 3 tank battalions (1st, 2nd and 3rd Tank Battalions of 49 MBTs each), 1 regular (9th Motor Rifle Battalion) and 1 mobilization (10th Motor Rifle Battalion, mobilized around the political changes in the end of 1989) motor rifle battalions (each with its own tank company of (10 MBTs each?) and an additional separate tank company (of 13 MBTs ?) for the security of the General Staff building in Sofia and 2MBTs in the Brigade HQ for the brigade's CO and XO.
  - Rocket Artillery Brigade
  - 46th Army Tactical Missile Brigade, in Samokov
  - 128th Mobile Missile-Technical Base, in Samokov
  - 5th Army Artillery Regiment, in Samokov
  - 19th Army Destroyer Anti-Tank Brigade (19тa Армейскa Изтребителна Противотанкова Артилерийска Бригада), in Samoranovo (the brigade also had ATGMs (9M14 Malyutka, also known in the Bulgarian army as "first generation ATGM") until 1981, when the systems were transferred to the front-line MR divisions)
    - Command (Командване)
    - Staff (Щаб)
    - Reconnaissance and Fire Control Battery (Батарея за Разузнаване и Управление (БРУ))
    - 1st Destroyer Anti-Tank Artillery Division (1ви Изтребителен Противотанков Артилерийски Дивизион (1ви ИПТАДн)
      - 1st, 2nd and 3rd Batteries - 6x MT-12 antitank guns per battery
    - 2nd Destroyer Anti-Tank Artillery Division (2ри Изтребителен Противотанков Артилерийски Дивизион (2ри ИПТАДн)
      - 4th, 5th and 6th Batteries - 6x MT-12 antitank guns per battery
    - 3rd Destroyer Anti-Tank Artillery Division (3ти Изтребителен Противотанков Артилерийски Дивизион (3ти ИПТАДн)
      - 7th, 8th and 9th Batteries - 6x 100mm self-propelled SAU-100 (probably PT-SAU T-100 tank destroyers on T-34 chassis?)
    - 4th Destroyer Anti-Tank Artillery Division (4ти Изтребителен Противотанков Артилерийски Дивизион (4ти ИПТАДн)
      - 10th, 11th and 12th Batteries - 6x 100mm self-propelled SAU-100 (probably PT-SAU T-100 tank destroyers on T-34 chassis?)
    - support units
  - Army Air Defence Artillery Regiment (in wartime 4 divisions x 4 batteries x 6 100 mm air defense guns KS-19, reduced strength in peacetime, only for training - 2 divisions x 1 battery x 2 platoons of a single gun each)
  - 1st Army Radio-technical Battalion, in Sofia
  - 59th Army Chemical Defence Regiment, in Musachevo
  - 88th Army Engineer Regiment, in Kyustendil
  - 97th Army Signal Regiment, in Sofia
  - 1st Army Independent Electronic Warfare Battalion type "N", in Sofia
  - 1st Army Cable Laying Signal Battalion in Sofia
  - 1st Parachute-Reconnaissance Battalion, in Gorna Banya suburb of Sofia
  - Army Artillery-Reconnaissance Battalion
  - Pontoon Bridge Engineer Battalion, in Kyustendil

== 2nd Army ==
- 2nd Army, in Plovdiv, intended to strike towards Greece and Turkey
  - 2nd Motor Rifle Division, in Stara Zagora (bg:Втора мотострелкова дивизия)
    - 22nd Motor Rifle Regiment, in Harmanli
    - 38th Motor Rifle Regiment, in Stara Zagora
    - 49th Motor Rifle Regiment, in Simeonovgrad
    - 196th Motor Rifle Regiment, in Chirpan
    - 41st Artillery Regiment, in Stara Zagora
    - Anti-aircraft Missile Regiment, in Nova Zagora
    - 2nd Reconnaissance Battalion
    - 2nd Anti-tank Artillery Division
    - 2nd Missile Division, in Stara Zagora
    - 2nd Multiple Rocket Launch Artillery Division
    - 2nd Engineer Battalion
    - 2nd Signal Battalion, in Nova Zagora
    - 2nd Transport Battalion
    - 2nd Supply Battalion
    - 2nd Maintenance Battalion
    - 2nd Artillery Reconnaissance and Control Battery
    - 2nd Chemical Defence Company
    - 2nd Commandant's Company (Military Police)
    - 2nd Divisional Detachment for Medical Support (Medical-Sanitary Battalion in wartime)
  - 17th Motor Rifle Division, in Haskovo
    - 31st Motor Rifle Regiment, in Haskovo
    - 34th Motor Rifle Regiment, in Momchilgrad
    - 78th Motor Rifle Regiment, in Krumovgrad
    - 66th Motor Rifle Regiment, in Haskovo
    - 87th Artillery Regiment, in Kardzhali
    - 66th Anti-aircraft Missile Regiment, in Dimitrovgrad
    - 17th Reconnaissance Battalion
    - 17th Anti-tank Artillery Division
    - 17th Missile Division, in Dimitrovgrad
    - 17th Multiple Rocket Launch Artillery Division
    - 17th Engineer Battalion
    - 17th Signal Battalion, in Ivaylovgrad
    - 17th Transport Battalion
    - 17th Supply Battalion
    - 17th Maintenance Battalion
    - 17th Artillery Reconnaissance and Control Battery
    - 17th Chemical Defence Company
    - 17th Commandant's Company (Military Police)
    - 17th Divisional Detachment for Medical Support (Medical-Sanitary Battalion in wartime)
  - 5th Tank Brigade, in Kazanlak
  - 11th Tank Brigade, in Karlovo (bg:Единадесета танкова бригада)
  - Rocket Artillery Brigade
  - 56th Army Tactical Missile Brigade, in Marino Pole
  - 129th Mobile Missile-Technical Base, in Marino Pole
  - 4th Army Artillery Regiment, in Asenovgrad
  - 23rd Army Destroyer Anti-Tank Artillery Regiment (23ти Армейски Изтребителен Противотанков Артилерийски Полк (23ти АИПТАП)) in Plovdiv (around 1988-89 the regiment received 9M113 Konkurs, mounted on BRDM-2 (the ATGM-armed variant is known as BRDM-3) and became of mixed structure with 3 ATGM and 6 artillery batteries. On 1. September 1989 converted to 23rd Department for Reservists and Anti-Tank Artillery Training and Armament and Equipment Storage (23ти Отдел за Подготовка на Резервисти и Противотанкова Артилерия и Съхранение на Въоръжение и Техника (23ти ОПРПАСВТ))
    - 1st Destroyer Anti-Tank Artillery Division (1ви Изтребителен Противотанков Артилерийски Дивизион (1ви ИПТАДн))
      - 1st Battery - 4x BRDM-3; 2nd and 3rd Batteries - 6x MT-12 antitank guns
    - 2nd Destroyer Anti-Tank Artillery Division (2ри Изтребителен Противотанков Артилерийски Дивизион (2ри ИПТАДн))
      - 4th Battery - 4x BRDM-3; 5th and 6th Batteries - 6x MT-12 antitank guns
    - 3rd Destroyer Anti-Tank Artillery Division (3ти Изтребителен Противотанков Артилерийски Дивизион (3ти ИПТАДн))
      - 7th Battery - 4x BRDM-3; 8th and 9th Batteries - 6x MT-12 antitank guns
  - Army Air Defence Artillery Regiment (in wartime 4 divisions x 4 batteries x 6 100 mm air defense guns KS-19, reduced strength in peacetime, only for training - 2 divisions x 1 battery x 2 platoons of a single gun each)
  - 2nd Army Radio-technical Battalion, in Plovdiv
  - Army Chemical Defence Regiment
  - Army Engineer Regiment
  - Army Signal Regiment, in Plovdiv
  - 2nd Army Independent Electronic Warfare Battalion type "N", in Parvomay
  - 2nd Army Cable Laying Signal Battalion, in Plovdiv
  - 2nd Parachute Reconnaissance Battalion, in Sliven
  - Army Artillery-Reconnaissance Battalion

== 3rd Army ==
- Headquarters in Sliven; 3rd Army was intended to strike towards Turkey
  - 7th Motor Rifle Division, in Yambol
    - 12th Motor Rifle Regiment, in Elhovo
    - 42nd Tank Regiment, in Yambol
    - 53rd Motor Rifle Regiment, in Bolyarovo
    - 82nd Motor Rifle Regiment, in Yambol
    - 20th Artillery Regiment, in Yambol
    - Anti-aircraft Missile Regiment
    - 7th Missile Division, in Boyanovo village, Elhovo Municipality
    - 7th Multiple Rocket Launch Artillery Division, in Yambol
    - 7th Anti-Tank Artillery Division, in Yambol
    - 7th Artillery Reconnaissance and Control Battery, in Yambol
    - 7th Reconnaissance Battalion
    - 7th Engineer Battalion
    - 7th Signal Battalion, in Yambol
    - 7th Transport Battalion, in Yambol
    - 7th Supply Battalion, in Yambol
    - 7th Maintenance Battalion
    - 7th Chemical Defence Company
    - 7th Commandant's Company (Military Police), in Yambol
    - 7th Divisional Detachment for Medical Support (7ми Дивизионен Отряд за Медицинско Осигуряване, Medical-Sanitary Battalion in wartime)
  - 16th Motor Rifle Division, in Burgas
    - 16th Motor Rifle Regiment, in Sredets
    - 33rd Motor Rifle Regiment, in Zvezdets
    - 37th Motor Rifle Regiment, in Tsarevo
    - 96th Motor Rifle Regiment, in Dolni Chiflik
    - 88th Artillery Regiment, in Sredets (at some point in the 1980s reduced to 88th Artillery Support Division)
    - Anti-aircraft Missile Regiment
    - 16th Reconnaissance Battalion
    - Self-propelled Field Artillery Division
    - 16th Anti-tank Artillery Division
    - 16th Missile Division, in Grudovo
    - 16th Multiple Rocket Launch Artillery Division
    - 16th Engineer Battalion
    - 16th Signal Battalion
    - 16th Transport Battalion
    - 16th Supply Battalion
    - 16th Maintenance Battalion
    - 16th Artillery Reconnaissance and Control Battery
    - 16th Chemical Defence Company
    - 16th Commandant's Company (Military Police)
    - 16th Divisional Detachment for Medical Support (Medical-Sanitary Battalion in wartime)
  - 18th Motor Rifle Division, in Shumen (maintained as a Not Ready Division - Cadre High Strength (US terms: Category III), a reserve formation to be brought up to strength in time of war)
    - 29th Motor Rifle Regiment, in Shumen
    - 40th Motor Rifle Regiment, in Razgrad
    - 45th Motor Rifle Regiment, in Dobrich
    - 86th Tank Regiment, in Shumen
    - 47th Artillery Regiment, in Targovishte
    - Anti-aircraft Missile Regiment
    - 18th Reconnaissance Battalion
    - 18th Anti-tank Artillery Division
    - 18th Missile Division, in Shumen
    - 18th Multiple Rocket Launch Artillery Division
    - 18th Engineer Battalion
    - 18th Signal Battalion
    - 18th Transport Battalion
    - 18th Supply Battalion
    - 18th Maintenance Battalion
    - 18th Artillery Reconnaissance and Control Battery
    - 18th Chemical Defence Company
    - 18th Commandant's Company (Military Police)
    - 18th Divisional Detachment for Medical Support (Medical-Sanitary Battalion in wartime)
  - 13th Tank Brigade, in Sliven
  - 24th Tank Brigade, in Aytos
  - Rocket Artillery Brigade
  - 66th Army Tactical Missile Brigade, in Kabile
  - 130th Mobile Missile-Technical Base, at Bezmer Air Base
  - 45th Army Artillery Regiment, in Targovishte (each combat division has 3 fire batteries)
    - Regimental Command (Kомандване)
    - Regimental Staff (Щаб)
    - Fire Control Battery (Батарея за Управление)
    - 1st 130-mm Gun Artillery Division (1ви 130-мм Оръдеен Артилерийски Дивизион)
    - 2nd 130-mm Gun Artillery Division (cadred) (2ри 130-мм Оръдеен Артилерийски Дивизион) (кадриран)
    - 3rd 152-mm 152 mm Howitzer-Gun Artillery Division (3ти 152-мм Гаубично-оръдеен Артилерийски Дивизион с МЛ-20)
    - 4th 152-mm 152 mm Howitzer-Gun Artillery Division (cadred) (4ти 152-мм Гаубично-оръдеен Артилерийски Дивизион с МЛ-20) (кадриран)
    - 5th 122-mm Rocket Artillery Division (5ти Реактивен артилерийски дизивион с БМ 21 "Град")
    - Training Mixed Artillery Division (Учебен Смесен Артилерийски Дивизион)
    - support units (обслужващи подразделения)
  - 55th Army Destroyer Anti-Tank Artillery Regiment (55ти Армейски Изтребителен Противотанков Артилерийски Полк (55ти АИПТАП)) in Karnobat (until 1981 the regiment had 1st Division of 3 batteries armed with 9M14 Malyutka, mounted on BRDM-2, 2nd Division of 3 MT-12 batteries (6 guns per battery), 3rd Division of 3 SAU-100 batteries with SAU-100 (PT-SAU T-100 on T-34 chassis) of 6 guns per battery and 4th Division, identical to the 3rd and cadred in peacetime. In 1981 it lost its Malyutka missile systems and transformed to three identical divisions of 3 batteries of 6 MT-12 antitank guns each. Then in 1987 it transferred a division's worth of MT-12s (18 pieces) to the Higher Artillery School in Shumen as mobilization reserve for the formation of a wartime anti-tank division under its cadred Destroyer Anti-Tank Artillery Brigade - Reserve of the High Command. At the same time 55th Regiment received 9M113 Konkurs, mounted on BRDM-2s and converted to mixed structure
    - 1st Destroyer Anti-Tank Artillery Division (1ви Изтребителен Противотанков Артилерийски Дивизион (1ви ИПТАДн))
      - 1st Battery - 4x BRDM-3; 2nd and 3rd Batteries - 6x MT-12 antitank guns
    - 2nd Destroyer Anti-Tank Artillery Division (2ри Изтребителен Противотанков Артилерийски Дивизион (2ри ИПТАДн))
      - 4th Battery - 4x BRDM-3; 5th and 6th Batteries - 6x MT-12 antitank guns
    - 3rd Destroyer Anti-Tank Artillery Division (3ти Изтребителен Противотанков Артилерийски Дивизион (3ти ИПТАДн))
      - 7th Battery - 4x BRDM-3; 8th and 9th Batteries - 6x MT-12 antitank guns
  - Army Air Defence Artillery Regiment (in wartime 4 divisions x 4 batteries x 6 100 mm air defense guns KS-19, reduced strength in peacetime, only for training - 2 divisions x 1 battery x 2 platoons of a single gun each)
  - 3rd Army Radio-technical Battalion, in Sliven
  - Army Chemical Defence Regiment
  - Army Engineer Regiment
  - Army Signal Regiment, in Sliven
  - 3rd Army Independent Electronic Warfare Battalion type "N", in Sliven
  - 3rd Army Cable Laying Signal Battalion, in Sliven
  - 3rd Parachute Reconnaissance Battalion, in Sliven (3ти Парашутно-разузнавателен батальон (3ти ПРБ))
  - Army Artillery-Reconnaissance Battalion

== Organization and Equipment ==
The eight motor rifle divisions were not all organized in the same way. Four fielded a tank regiment and three motor rifle regiments and four divisions fielded four motor rifle regiments. Also the two training/reserve divisions (18th, 21st) were partially equipped with older equipment.

- Motor Rifle Division
  - Motor Rifle Regiment
    - 3x Motor Rifle Battalions, with MT-LB armored personnel carriers
    - Tank Battalion, with T-55 main battle tanks
    - Reconnaissance Company, with BRDM-2 armored cars and tracked BRM "Sova" reconnaissance vehicles
    - Anti-tank Artillery Battery, with towed 100mm T-12 anti-tank guns
    - Air Defence Battery, with a mix of Strela 1 and ZSU-57-2 vehicles
    - Engineer Company
  - Motor Rifle Regiment
    - 3x Motor Rifle Battalions, with BTR-60 wheeled armored personnel carriers
    - Tank Battalion, with T-55 main battle tanks
    - Reconnaissance Company, with BRDM-2 armored cars and tracked BRM "Sova" reconnaissance vehicles
    - Anti-tank Artillery Battery, with towed 100mm T-12 anti-tank guns
    - Air Defence Battery, with a mix of Strela 1 and ZSU-57-2 vehicles
    - Engineer Company
  - Motor Rifle Regiment
    - 3x Motor Rifle Battalions, in trucks and lorries
    - Tank Battalion, with T-55 main battle tanks
    - Reconnaissance Company, with BRDM-2 armored cars and tracked BRM "Sova" reconnaissance vehicles
    - Anti-tank Artillery Battery, with towed 100mm T-12 anti-tank guns
    - Air Defence Battery, with a mix of Strela 1 and ZSU-57-2 vehicles
    - Engineer Company
  - Tank Regiment (Replaced by a fourth MT-LB-equipped motor rifle regiment in the 2nd, 7th, 16th, and 17th motor rifle divisions)
    - 3x Tank Battalions, with T-55 main battle tanks (T-62 main battle tanks in a few units)
    - Motor Rifle Battalion, with MT-LB armored personnel carriers
    - Reconnaissance Company, with BRDM-2 armored cars and tracked BRM "Sova" reconnaissance vehicles
    - Air Defence Battery, with a mix of Strela 1 and ZSU-57-2 vehicles
    - Engineer Company
    - Logistic, maintenance, chemical defence, medical, and signal units
  - Artillery Regiment
    - 3x Field Artillery Division, with 18x towed 122mm M-30 howitzers
    - Heavy Howitzer Artillery Division, with 18x towed 122mm ML-20 howitzers (Were being replaced with towed 152mm D-20 howitzers in the late 1980s)
    - Self-propelled Field Artillery Division, with 18x self-propelled 122mm 2S1 Gvozdika howitzers (Not present in training/reserve divisions)
    - Logistic, maintenance, chemical defence, medical, security, and signal units
  - Air Defence Regiment
    - 5x Anti-aircraft Missile batteries, with either Kub or Osa air defence systems
    - Logistic, maintenance, chemical defence, medical, security, and signal units
  - Reconnaissance Battalion, with BRDM-2 armored cars and tracked BRM "Sova" reconnaissance vehicles (Training/reserve divisions fielded a mix of BRDM-1 and BTR-40 armored cars)
  - Anti-tank Artillery Division, with towed 100mm T-12 anti-tank guns and BRDM-2 vehicles in the anti-tank variant with Konkurs anti-tank missiles (Some units fielded older towed 100mm BS-3 or towed 85mm D-48 anti-tank guns)
  - Missile Division, with 4x 9K52 Luna-M ballistic missile launchers (Were being replaced with OTR-21 Tochka in the late 1980s)
  - Multiple Rocket Launch Artillery Division, with 18x 122mm BM-21 Grad multiple rocket launchers
  - Engineer Battalion
  - Signal Battalion
  - Transport Battalion
  - Supply Battalion
  - Maintenance Battalion
  - Artillery Reconnaissance and Control Battery
  - Chemical Defence Company
  - Commandant's Company (Military Police)
  - Medical-Sanitary Battalion

The only armoured formation in the Army of the Kingdom of Bulgaria was the Armoured Brigade, based in Sofia and armed with German equipment. After the end of the Second World War and the signing of the Paris peace treaty by Bulgaria in 1947, the Soviet Union began to strengthen the armed forces of its new satellite state. In addition to the Armoured Brigade a new tank regiment was formed in Samokov with 65 T-34 tanks (in 1947) and an armoured troops school was formed in Botevgrad (in 1950). A formation of 1st Tank Division also started in Kazanlak in 1947 with T-34s, only to be disbanded in 1949 with its four tank regiments to be converted into tank brigades and subordinated to the 1st, 2nd, 3rd Army and the General Reserve respectively. The front line infantry divisions started forming tank battalions (one each) and several hundred trophy German tanks were transferred to Bulgaria to form a static fortified defensive line along the Turkish border, unofficially called the "Krali Marko Line". Later, when the T-54 and T-55 started replacing the T-34 in larger quantities, some of the retired Soviet tanks were added. In 1950 two new tank divisions were formed (in Sofia and Kazanlak), but with the technological advancements and the increase in weight and dimensions of the tanks at that time after an evaluation it was decided, that the predominantly mountainous terrain of Bulgaria is unsuitable for the deployment of tank divisions and the Bulgarian Land Forces reformed their tank forces into brigades and regiments.

333 Т-72s of Soviet and Czechoslovak manufacture delivered until the collapse of the Socialist bloc and spread between the 9th and 13th tank brigades and training centers. The 5th, 11th and 24th tank brigades and the tank regiments with T-55s. The 220 T-62s put in reserve storage. In 1992 another 100 T-72s and 100 BMP-1s received second-hand from Russia, went to the 24th Tank Brigade. The five active tank brigades (9th in the 1st Army, 5th and 11th in the 2nd Army and 13th and 24th in the 3rd Army) were organized as follows:

- Tank Brigade
  - 3x Tank Battalions, with T-72 main battle tanks or T-55
  - Motor Rifle Battalion, with BMP-23 infantry fighting vehicles or BMP-1
  - Self-propelled Field Artillery Division, with 18x self-propelled 122mm 2S1 Gvozdika howitzers
  - Reconnaissance Company, with BRDM-2 armored cars and tracked BRM "Sova" reconnaissance vehicles
  - Anti-aircraft Missile Battery, with 4x Strela-10 air defence systems
  - Missile Division, with 2x 9K52 Luna-M ballistic missile launchers (Were being replaced with OTR-21 Tochka in the late 1980s)
  - Engineer Company
  - Logistic, maintenance, chemical defence, medical, and signal units

The three rocket artillery brigades were organized as follows:

- Rocket Artillery Brigade
  - 3x Rocket Artillery Divisions, with 18x 122mm BM-21 Grad multiple rocket launchers
  - Rocket Artillery Division, with 130mm RM-51 multiple rocket launchers
  - Logistic, maintenance, chemical defence, medical, security, and signal units

The three army tactical missile brigades were organized as follows:

- Army Operation-Tactical Missile Brigade - one for each army, a Frontal Operation-Tactical Missile Brigade as General Reserve
  - 2x Missile Divisions, with 4x R-300 Elbrus (Scud-B) ballistic missile launchers, the frontal brigade armed with R-400 Oka
  - Logistic, maintenance, chemical defence, medical, security, and signal units

The three army artillery regiments were organized as follows:

- Army Artillery Regiment
  - 3x Field Artillery Divisions, with 18x towed 122mm M-30 howitzers
  - Long Range Artillery Division, with 18x towed 130mm M-46 howitzers
  - Heavy Howitzer Artillery Division, with 18x towed 122mm ML-20 howitzers (Were being replaced with towed 152mm D-20 howitzers in the late 1980s)
  - Logistic, maintenance, chemical defence, medical, security, and signal units

The three army anti-tank regiments were organized as follows:

- Army Anti-tank Regiment
  - 3x Anti-tank Artillery Division, with 12x towed 100mm T-12 guns and 6x BRDM-2 vehicles in the anti-tank variant with Konkurs anti-tank missiles
  - Logistic, maintenance, chemical defence, medical, security, and signal units
