= 61st Stryamska Mechanized Brigade =

- 61-ва Стрямска механизирана пехотна бригада
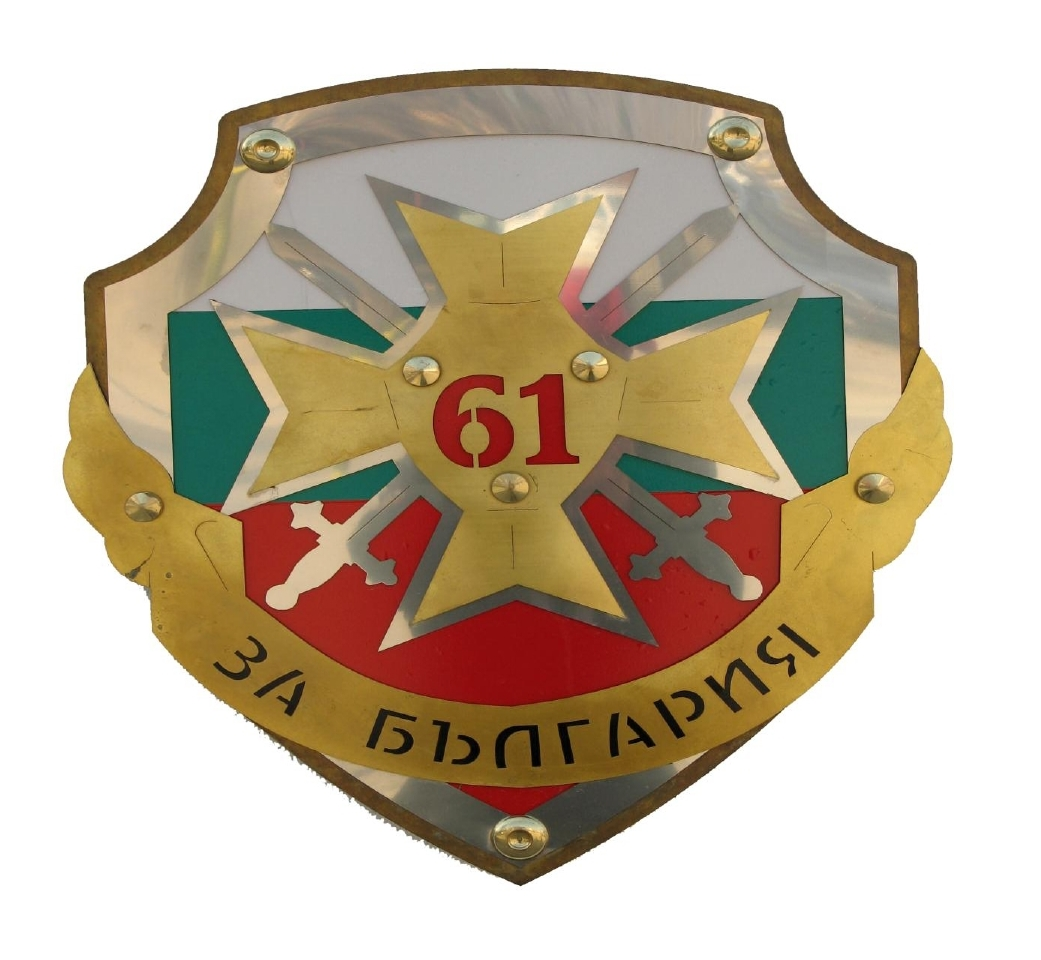
- 61st Stryamska Mechanized Infantry Brigade
- Active: 2 October 1992 - present
- Country: Bulgaria
- Branch: Bulgarian land forces
- Type: Mechanized infantry
- Garrison/HQ: Karlovo
- Equipment: AR-M1, RPG-22, BMP-23, BMP-1

Aircraft flown
- Cargo helicopter: Mi-8 / Mi-17

61st Stryamska Mechanized Infantry Brigade (Bulgarian: 61-ва Стрямска механизирана пехотна бригада) is a mechanized infantry brigade of the Bulgarian land forces.

It is based in Karlovo, central Bulgaria.

61st Brigade is one of the two units in the Bulgarian army which will have an increase in personnel until 2014 (the other one being 68th SF Brigade, as manpower in all other branches of the military will be reduced according to the 2010 reform plans.
