= Balkans campaign =

Balkans campaign may refer to:

- Alexander's Balkan campaign (335 BC)
- Maurice's Balkan campaigns (582–602)
- Balkan Front (World War I) (1914–1918)
- Balkans campaign (World War II) (1940–1945)
