= RM-51 =

RM-51 multiple rocket launcher
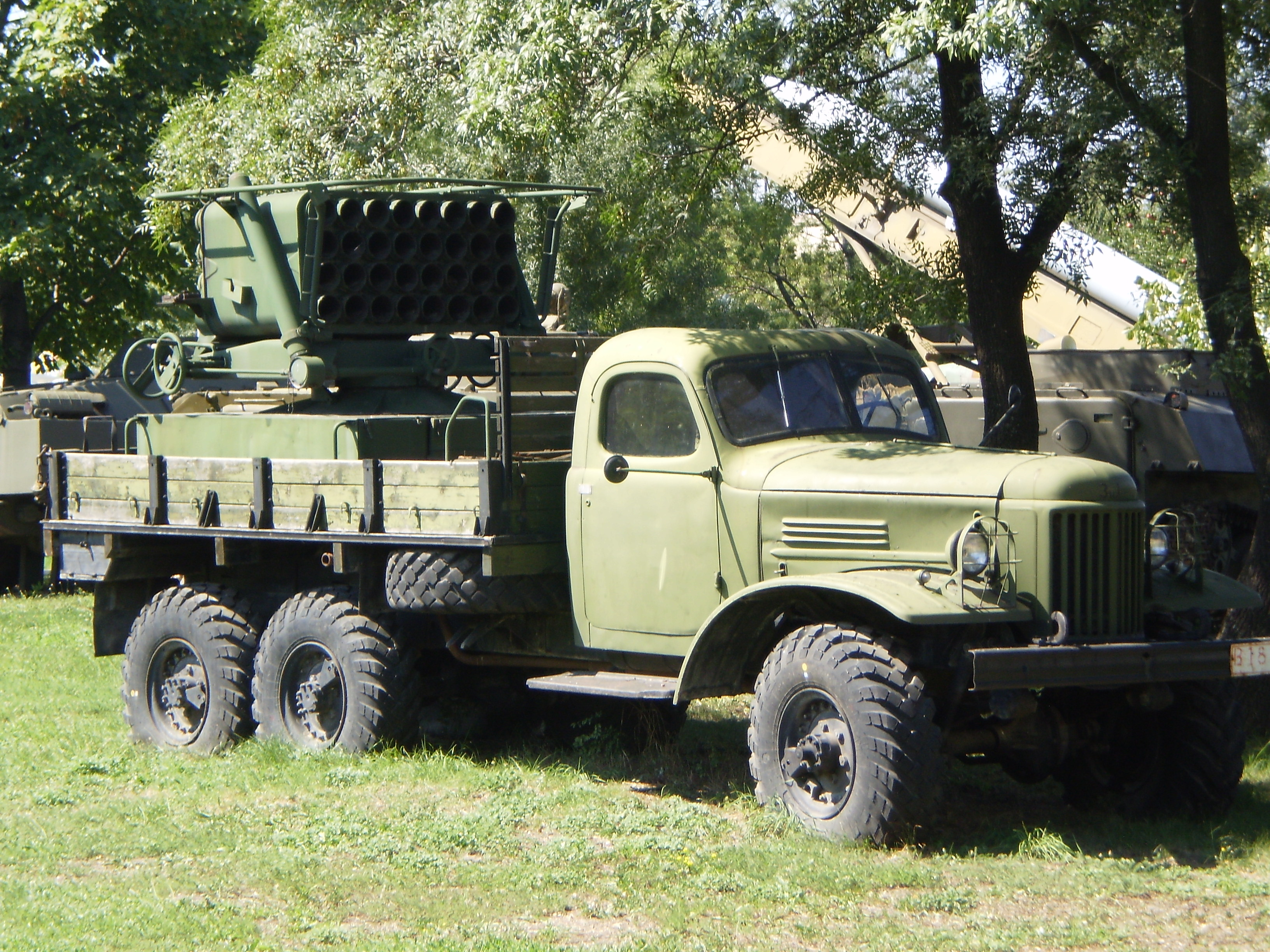
- RM-51, mounted on ZIL-157 truck, displayed at the National Museum of Military History in Sofia, Bulgaria.
- Type: Self-propelled multiple rocket launcher
- Place of origin: Czechoslovakia

Service history
- In service: 1956–late 1990s
- Used by: See users

Production history
- Designer: Škoda, Zbrojovka Brno and VTÚ
- Designed: 1949–1956
- Manufacturer: Škoda
- Variants: vz. 51, M-51, R-2

Specifications
- Mass: 7.575 tonnes
- Length: 7 m (23 ft 0 in)
- Width: 2.38 m (7 ft 10 in)
- Height: 2.18 m (7 ft 2 in)
- Crew: 6
- Caliber: Diameter: 130 mm (5.1 in); Length: .8 m (2 ft 7 in); Weight: 24.2 kg (53 lb)
- Barrels: 32 (4 rows)
- Elevation: +50°/0°
- Traverse: 240° (120° left/right)
- Rate of fire: 32 rockets in 12.4 seconds (2 min. reloading time)
- Muzzle velocity: 420 m/s (1,400 ft/s)
- Maximum firing range: 8.2 km (5.1 mi)
- Main armament: ORNNG missiles with NZ-60V warhead
- Suspension: 6×6 wheeled
- Maximum speed: 40 km/h (25 mph) (road); 10 km/h (6.2 mph) (cross-country)

The RM-51 (Raketomet vzor 1951) multiple rocket launcher was a Czechoslovak Army alternative of the BM-13 multiple rocket launcher developed in the 1950s.

== Variants ==
- vz. 51 – Original model, based on Praga V3S 6×6 truck.
- M-51 – Export version used by Austria, based on Steyr 680 M3 6×6 truck.
- RM-51 – Export variant, based on ZIS-151 and ZIL-157 6×6 trucks.

== Operators ==
- Austria – 18 delivered in 1974, designated M-51.
- Bulgaria – 24 delivered in 1963.
- Democratic Republic of the Congo – 6 in service as of 2021.
- Indonesia – In 2012, Indonesian Army retrofitted their RM-51, including replacing the original Praga V3S truck with Reo M35A2 truck.
- Czechoslovakia
- Cuba – 20 delivered between 1965 and 1966.
- Egypt – 50 delivered between 1957 and 1958.
- Libya – 36 delivered between 1976 and 1977.
- Romania – 58 delivered between 1956 and 1965. Designated R-2, the launchers were later mounted on ZIL-157 trucks.

== Gallery ==
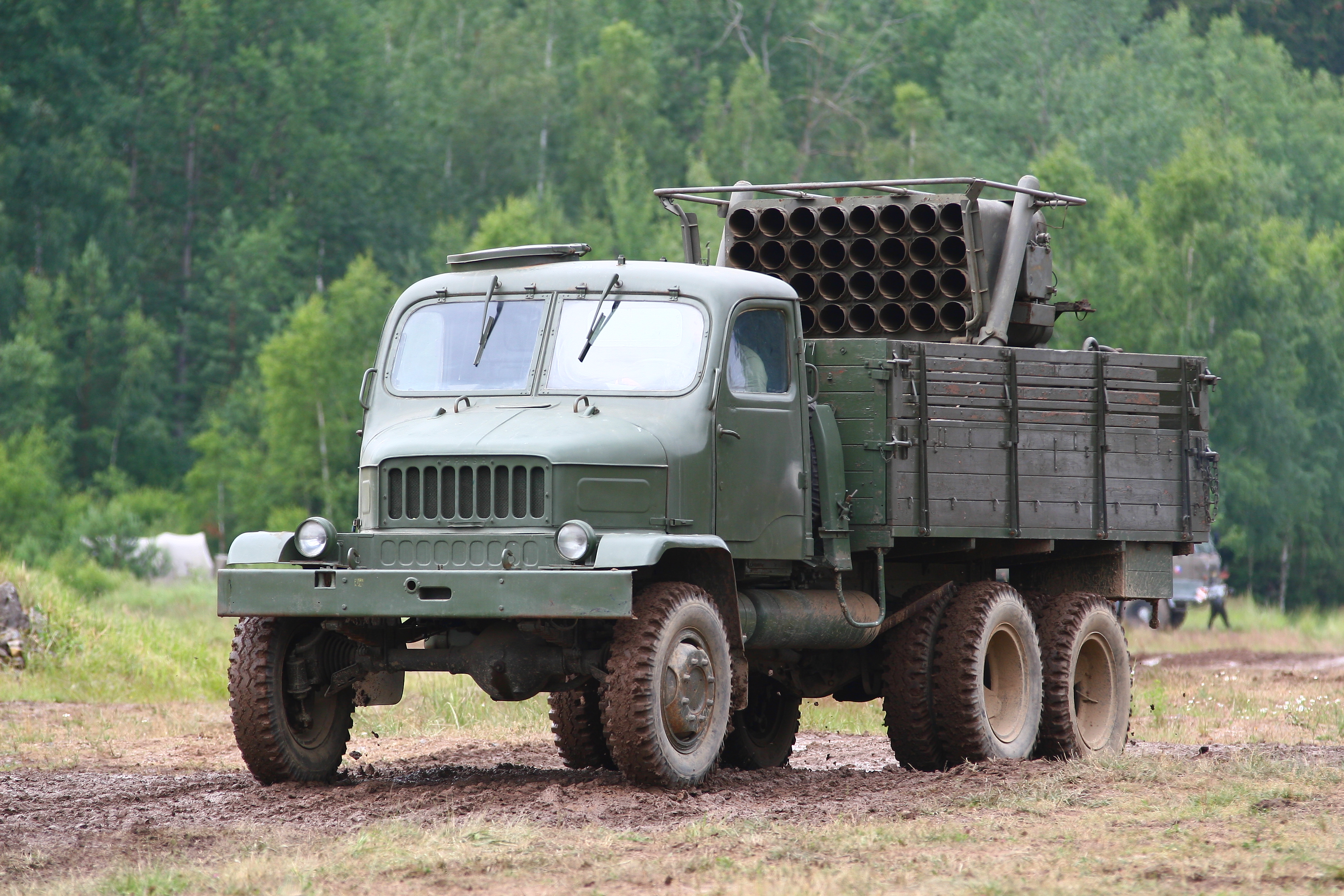
Vintage vz. 51 on Praga V3S chassis

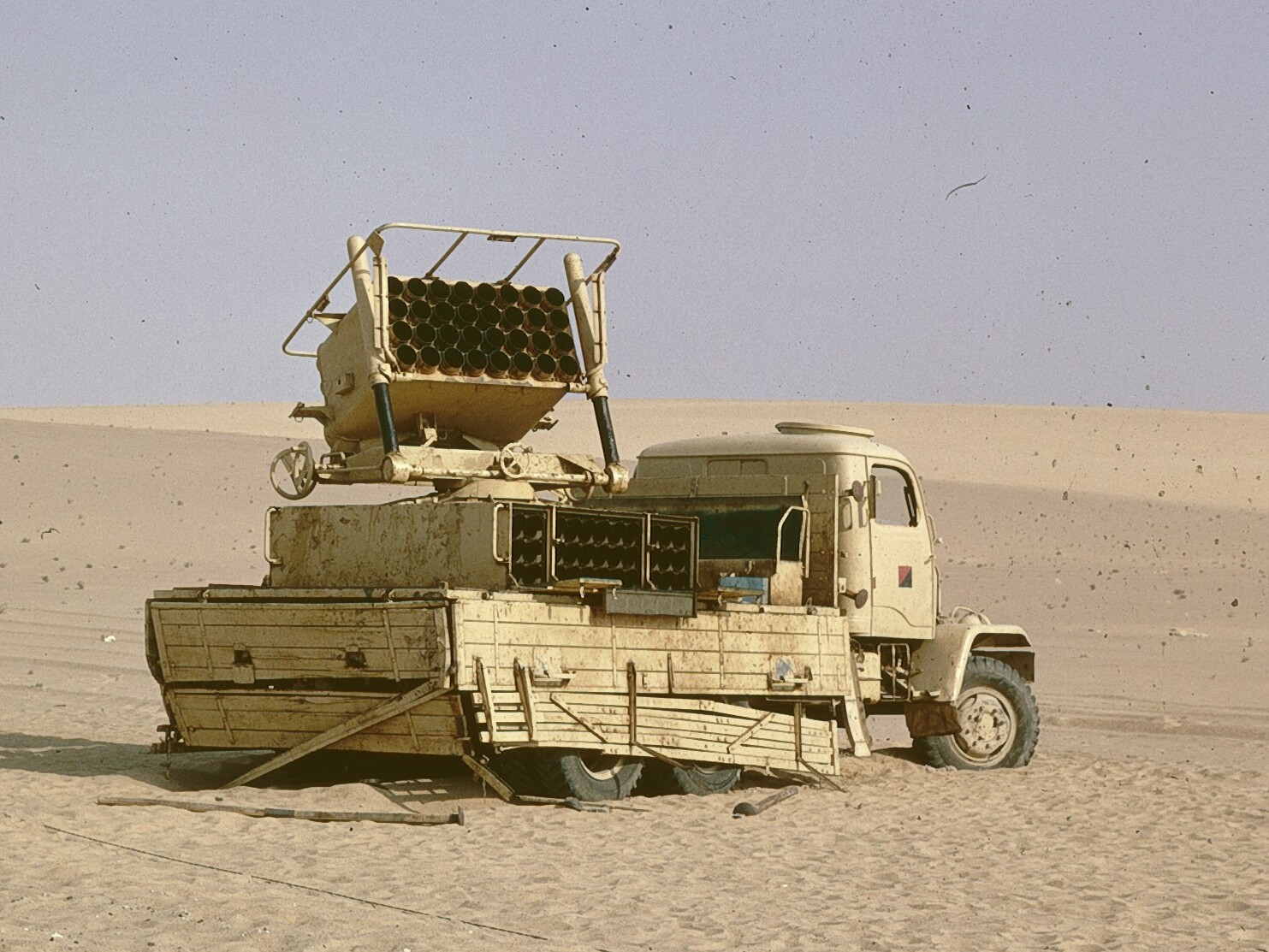
Egyptian vz. 51 during Six-Day War

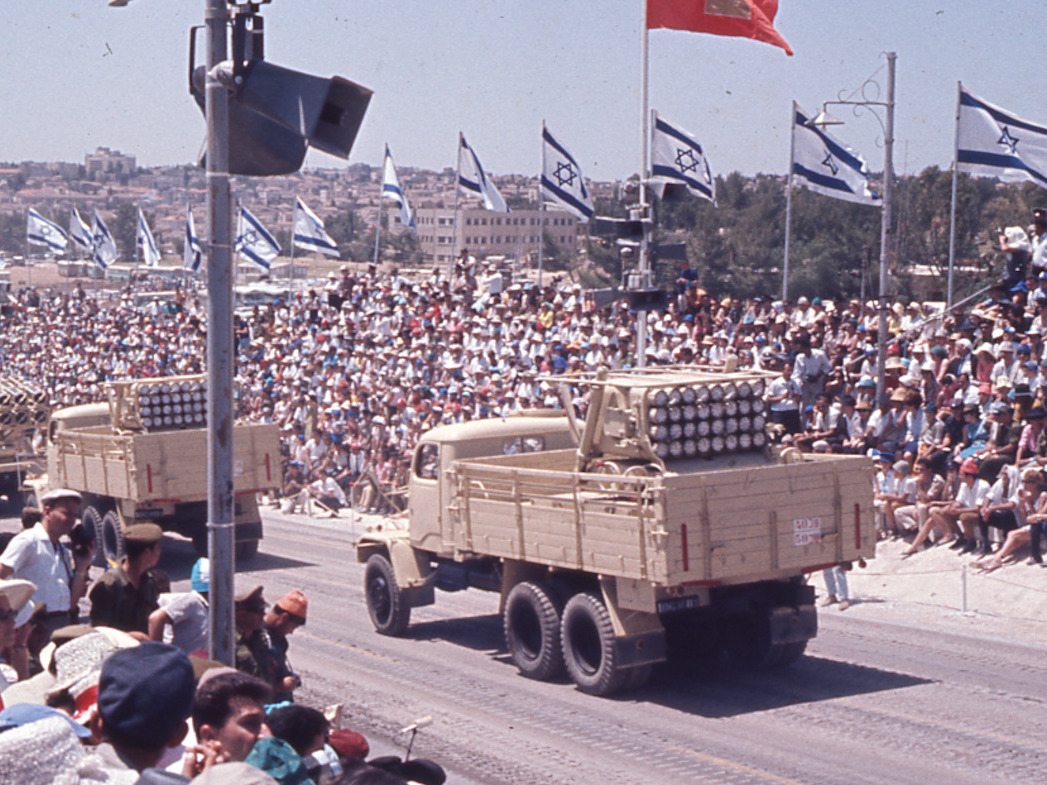
Captured Egyptian vz. 51 at parade in Jerusalem, 1968

== See also ==
- RM-70 multiple rocket launcher – the successor of RM-51
