= 13th Tank Brigade (Bulgaria) =

The 13th Tank Brigade (Military Unit Number 22220) is a former land formation of the Bulgarian Army.

== History ==
The brigade was established in October 1948 after the relocation of three tank companies - the 1st tank company from Kazanlak, the 2nd tank company from Sofia and the 3rd tank company from Plovdiv. The brigade was officially formed on January 1, 1949 as the Third Tank Brigade and was assigned to the Third Army. The brigade received his battle flag on October 6, 1950, a date that is officially celebrated in the history of the brigade.

Later the brigade was renamed the Thirteenth Tank Brigade, and was still assigned to the Third Army in 1980. Since 1998 it has been the 13th "Sliven" Tank Brigade. It changed its state and organization several times. On June 1, 2008, the brigade became a Center for training of tank units.

The 9th Tank Brigade and the 13th Tank Brigade in Sliven were the elite tank formations of the army. They received T-72 tanks, BMP-1 and BMP-23 infantry fighting vehicles while the other brigades only received older equipment.

The Specialists' Training Centre, in addition to training, is the storage facility of the operational reserve of 160 T-72M1 tanks and many other armoured vehicles.

== Names ==
- Third Tank Brigade - 1949
- Thirteenth Tank Brigade - until 1998
- Thirteenth Sliven Tank Brigade - 1998 - 2002
- Thirteenth Tank Brigade - 2002 - June 1, 2008
- Center for Training of Tank units - June 1, 2008 - December 1, 2012
- Center for training of specialists - December 1, 2012 -

== Commanders ==
- Lieutenant Colonel Dimitar Popov - from 1949 to 1951;
- Lieutenant Colonel Atanas Bakalov - from 1951 to 1952;
- Colonel Nikola Grancharov - from 1955 to 1956;
- Lieutenant Colonel Tsotso Tsotsov - from 1956 to 1962;
- Colonel Kalin Prodanov - from 1963 to 1970;
- Colonel Genko Dankov - from 1970 to 1978;
- Colonel Kolyu Kolev - from 1978 to 1980;
- Colonel Dimitar Odrinski - from 1980 to 1982;
- Lieutenant Colonel Panto Pantev - from 1982 to 1986;
- Lieutenant Colonel Vasil Valkov - from 1986 to 1987;
- Colonel Gancho Denev - from 1987 to 1989;
- Lieutenant Colonel Ivan Dobrev - from 1989 to 1992;
- Colonel Vasil Vasilev - from 1992 to 1997;
- Colonel Galimir Pehlivanov - from 1997 to 2002;
- Colonel Stefan Vassilev - from 2002 to 2003;
- Colonel Tsvetan Harizanov - from 2003 to 2005;
- Colonel Plamen Atanasov - from 2006 to 2008;
- Colonel Nikolai Spirov - from 2008 to 2010;
- Colonel Hristo Stamatov - from 2010 to 2015;
- Colonel Lyubomir Vachev - since 2015

== Notes ==
- http://www.ww2.dk/new/wp/Bulgaria/3a.htm
