= BMP-23 =

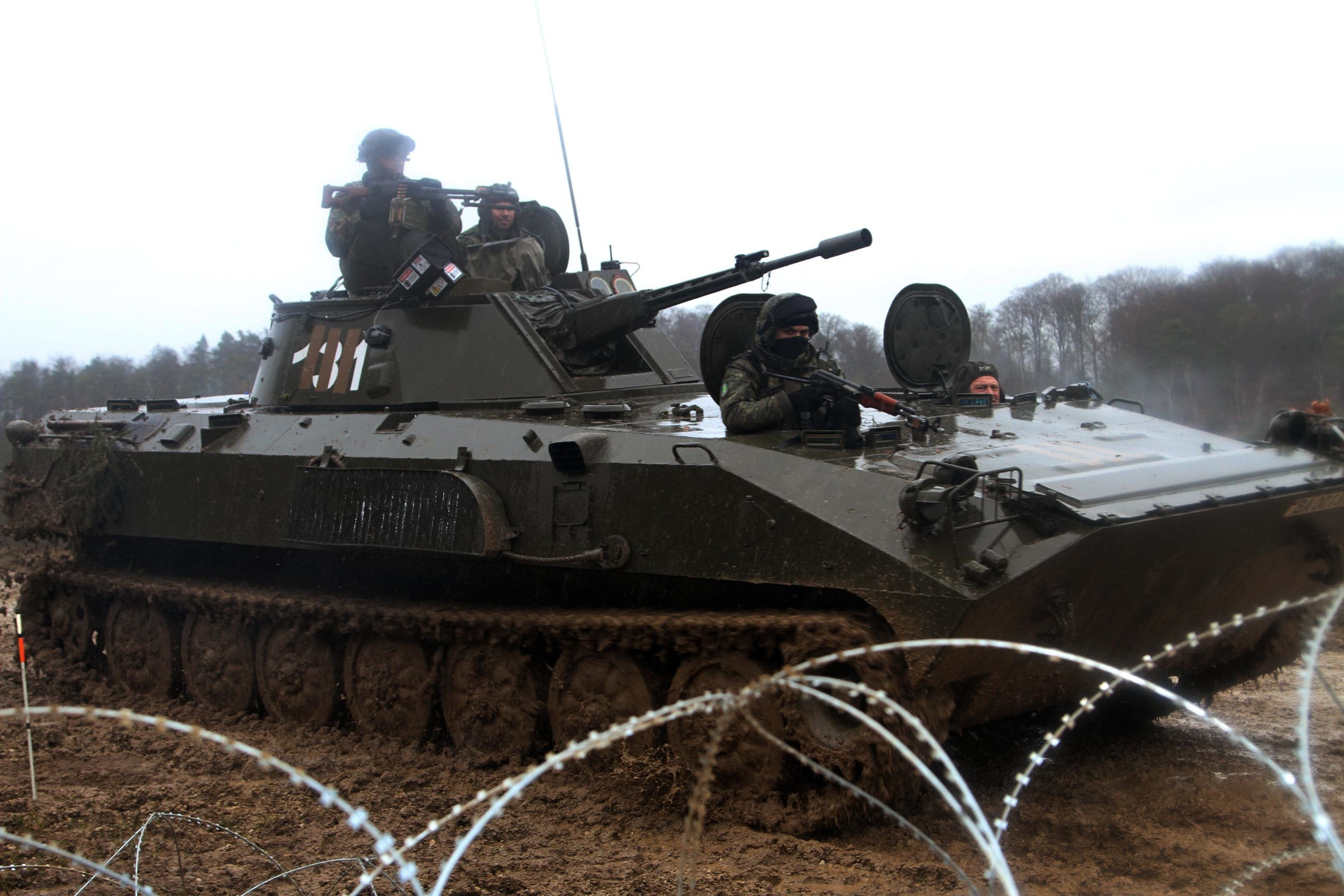
- Type: Infantry fighting vehicle
- Place of origin: Bulgaria

Specifications
- Mass: 15.2 tonnes
- Length: 7.28 m
- Width: 3.05 m
- Height: 2.53 m
- Crew: 3 (7–9 passengers)
- Armor: >20 mm
- Main armament: 23 mm automatic cannon 2A14; 9K111 ATGM "Fagot"
- Secondary armament: 7.62 mm machine gun (PKT)
- Engine: 315 hp
- Power/weight: 20.7 hp/tonne
- Suspension: torsion bar
- Operational range: 550–600 km
- Maximum speed: 62 km/h (road)

The BMP-23 (бойна машина на пехотата) is a Bulgarian infantry fighting vehicle which was first introduced in the early 1980s. It was based on a design from the Bulgarian design bureau from the 1970s, being presented in the 1980s. The hull is based on that of the Soviet 2S1 self-propelled howitzer (also produced by Bulgaria) with thicker armour and a more powerful diesel engine, which is itself based on a stretched MT-LB chassis. Since the 2S1 is a larger vehicle, the troop transport compartment is not as cramped as that of the BMP-1. The armour is made of welded rolled steel, capable of withstanding heavy machine gun fire.

The BMP-23 was first seen on a parade in 1984.

== Design ==
=== Armament ===
The turret of the BMP-23 is armed with a 23-mm autocannon 2A14 from the air-defence gun ZU-23-2 with 600 rounds, and initially the 9M14 Malyutka ATGM was used however this was later replaced on the BMP-23D modernization with the 9K111 Fagot ATGM. There is also a coaxial PKT machine gun. As the BMP-30 variant uses a turret from the BMP-2 it has no ATGMs and uses the 2A42 autocannon.

== Variants ==
- BMP-23 - Baseline variant with 9M14 Malyutka ATGM.
- BMP-23D - Upgraded variant with 9K111 Fagot ATGM and 81mm smoke grenade launchers.
- BRM-23 - Reconnaissance version, limited production. Entered service in 1991.
- BMP-30 - Modified BMP-23 with the turret taken directly from the BMP-2.

== Operators ==
- Bulgaria: The BMP-23 served with the Bulgarian army in Iraq.
