= Dzhurov =

Dzhurov or Djurov (Bulgarian: Джуров) is a Bulgarian masculine surname; its feminine counterpart is Dzhurova or Djurova. It may refer to:

- Chavdar Djurov (1946–1972), Bulgarian pilot
- Dobri Dzhurov (1916–2002), Bulgarian politician and military leader
- Spas Dzhurov (1944–2018), Bulgarian athlete
