= Tasharvat =

Grove on a branch of the Silk Route

Coordinates: 39.7524906°N 54.3744304°E

Tasharvat is a small grove adjacent to a spring, en route from Jebel to Gozli Ata, in Turkmenistan. It stood in a branch of the Silk Route, and the ruins of a stone-walled caravanserai features as a tourist-spot.

In 1978–79, a few utilities were constructed by Bulgarian People's Army for the rare travelers; an inscription dedicated to Soviet-Bulgaria relations was also installed. (Note: The inscription (in Russian) reads, "ПОСТРОИЛИ В 1979 Г. ПУСТЬВЕННО ТЕЧЕТ ЭТОТ ИСТОЧНИКИ ПУСТЬ НИКОГДА НЕ УССОХНУТ КОРНИ БОЛКАГО-СОВЕТСКОЙ ДРУЖБЫ.") Three stone benches, a tap for potable water, and a sculpture —all on a concrete plinth— are all that survives.
