= Hristo Dobrev =

Bulgarian politician and military leader

Hristo Dobrev Христо Добрев Стоянов
- Native name: Христо Добрев Стоянов
- Nickname: "Dico"
- Born: Hristo Dobrev Stoyanov; 2 June 1923; Dragana, Lovech Province, Kingdom of Bulgaria
- Died: 5 March 2013 (aged 89) Sofia, Bulgaria
- Allegiance: People's Republic of Bulgaria
- Branch: Bulgarian People's Army
- Service years: 1942–1990
- Rank: Colonel General

Colonel General Hristo "Dico" Dobrev Stoyanov (Bulgarian: Христо Добрев Стоянов) was a Bulgarian politician, partisan and military leader. He was the last Chief of the General Staff of the Bulgarian People's Army. He was a candidate member (1966–71) and member of the Central Committee of the BKP (1971–89).

== Biography ==
=== Education and youth years ===
He was born on June 2, 1923, in Dragana, Bulgaria. As a student in the 7th grade of the Tsar Boris III High School was an active member of the Workers Youth League.

He participated in the resistance movement during World War II. Threatened with police arrest, he went underground and became a guerrilla in early 1942, in the Partisan squad "Hristo Clothchev", where he took the name "Dico." On 30 October 1942, he became a member of the Bulgarian Communist Party. After the communist coup in September 1944, he graduated from the People's Men's High School "Hristo Clothchev" in 1945.

=== Professional activity ===
He joined the Bulgarian People's Army on September 16, 1944, and served as assistant commander of the Guard Team in the 34th Infantry Trojan Regiment. Between January 16, 1945, and January 30, 1946, he was a political instructor in the 9th Infantry Division. He graduated from the prestigious Frunze Military Academy in 1950 and the Voroshilov Military Academy of the USSR Army General Staff in 1956. Throughout the 50s, he served in various low-level positions of the BNA. He was First Deputy Chief of the General Staff of BNA from 1960 to 1968. In 1973, he was appointed Deputy Minister of National Defense and Commander of the Land Forces by ministerial order of Dobri Dzhurov. He remained as First Deputy Minister of People's Defense and Commander of Ground Forces until 1987. Concurrently, he was Deputy Supreme Commander of the Unified Armed Forces of the Warsaw Treaty Organization (1980-1989). In this position, he commanded the parade in honor of the 1300th Anniversary of the Bulgarian State and oversaw the Shield-82 exercise. He was appointed Chief of the General Staff on 8 December 1989.

He was discharged from military service on 15 August 1990 and switched to the reserve on 22 December of that year.

=== Later life ===
In 2010, he was awarded with the Badge "For Contribution to the Ministry of Defense" the Minister of Defense Anyu Angelov to mark today's Land Forces Day. He was an honorary member of the Land Forces Association. He died on 5 March 2013 in Sofia.
