= Nikolai Tsonev =

Nikolay Tsonev

Minister of Defence
- In office 24 April 2008 – 27 July 2009
- Prime Minister: Sergei Stanishev
- Preceded by: Veselin Bliznakov
- Succeeded by: Nickolay Mladenov

Personal details
- Born: 9 June 1956 (age 69) Pernik, Bulgaria
- Party: New Alternative (since 2012-2022)
- Profession: Military officer, politician, businessman

Nikolay Georgiev Tsonev (Bulgarian: Николай Георгиев Цонев; born 9 June 1956) is a Bulgarian military officer, professor and politician. He served as the Bulgarian Minister of Defence between 2008 and 2009.

== Biography ==
Nikolay Tsonev was born on June 9, 1956, in the town of Pernik. He graduated from the "Georgi Dimitrov" People's Artillery and Air Defence Forces School in Shumen and in 1978 he became an officer in the Bulgarian Armed Forces. In the years from 1986 through 1989, he studied at Air Defense School "Vassilyevski" in Kyiv. In 1992, he left the army.

From 1992 to 1999, Tsonev participated in the management of several companies. In 1996, he graduated with an accounting degree at the University of National and World Economy. In 2005, he graduated Sofia University "St. Kliment Ohridski", where he majored in Philosophy. In 2006, he defended his doctorate thesis in Marketing. Since 2004, he has been a professor at UNWE (University of National and World Economy). Since 2015, Nikolay Tsonev has been an associate professor of Economics and Management, and since 2019 he has been elected as Head of the "Economics of Tourism" department at UNWE.

From 1999 to 2000, he headed the Public Procurement Directorate at the Ministry of Defence. In 2001, he became a ministerial adviser to the Minister of Defence Nikolay Svinarov, and in 2002 he headed the "Social Activities" Directorate at the Ministry of Defence. On April 24, 2008, he was appointed Minister of Defence in the government of Sergey Stanishev and remained on this position until the change of the cabinet on July 27, 2009.

On June 24, 2012, at the founding meeting of the political party "Nova Alternativa" he was elected chairman of the party. The party has a centrist orientation and professes patriotic-liberal ideas.

== Allegations and cases ==
In the months following the end of his tenure as defense minister, Nikolay Tsonev was investigated for abuses during his rule of the Ministry of Defence. On 1 April 2010 spectacular was arrested and charged with offering a bribe to an investigator at the time of his arrest deputy city prosecutor Roman Vasilev called Tsonev "absolute criminal". On 28 October 2012 he was acquitted by Sofia City Court on that charge.

On 1 June 2012 Tsonev was acquitted by the Supreme Court in another case – to conclude a four unprofitable transactions in 1999 when the head of "Management of supply" in the Ministry of Defence.

Tsonev is acquitted in all cases This has been cited as a key case of evidence of general corruption in Bulgaria's economy. and in August 2015 ordered the prosecution of second instance to pay him compensation amounting to 15 thousand Bulgarian lev.

Political offices
Preceded by Veselin Bliznakov	Minister of Defence of Bulgaria; 24 April 2008 – 27 July 2009	Succeeded by Nickolay Mladenov
