= Yordan Milanov =

Yordan Milanov may refer to:

- Yordan Milanov (architect)
- Yordan Milanov (general)
