= Kiril Bratanov =

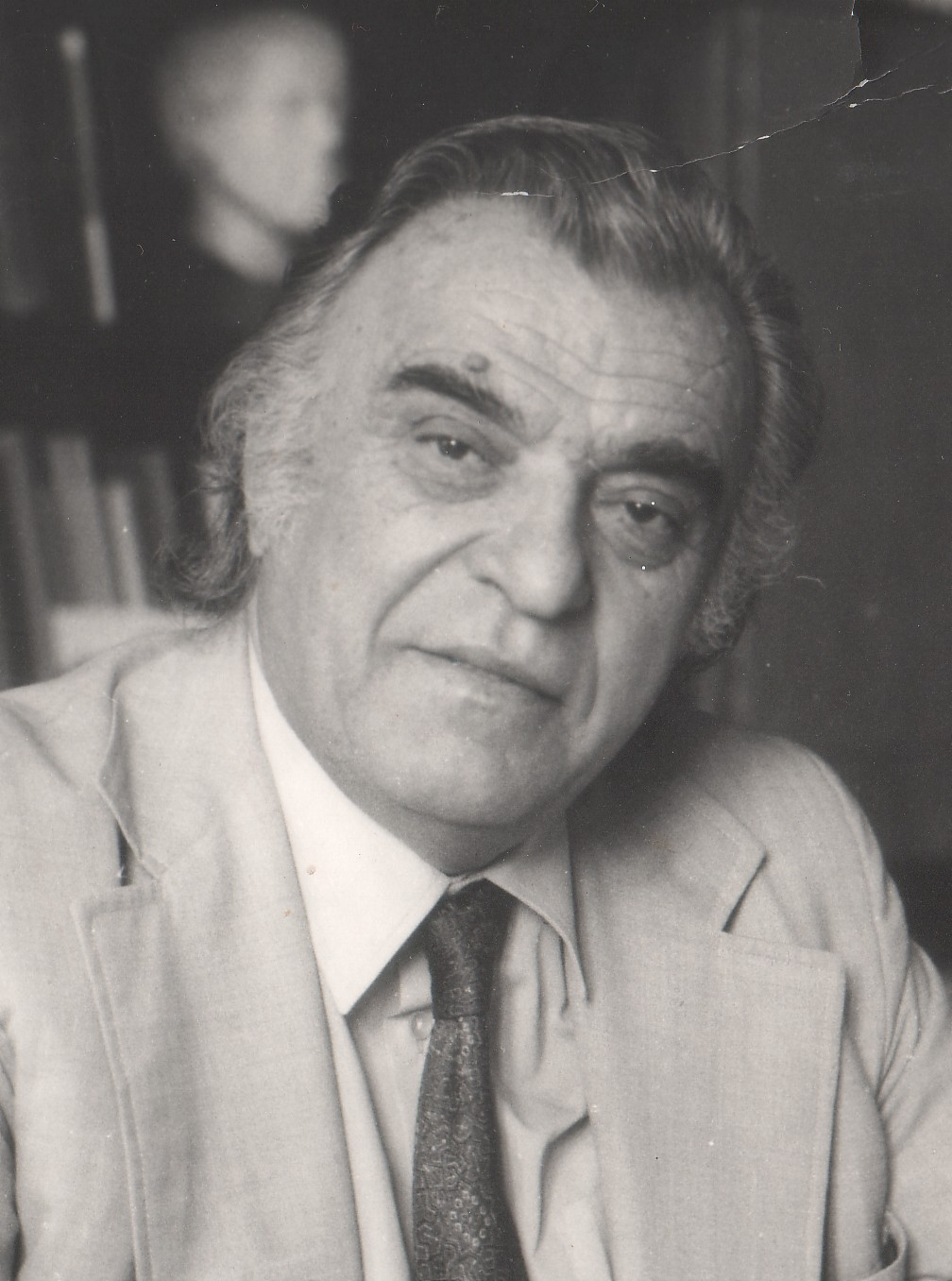
- Kiril Bratanov
- Born: 5 March 1911; Lukovit, Bulgaria
- Died: 16 October 1986 (aged 75); Sofia, Bulgaria
- Education: University of Sofia
- Known for: Reproductive immunology
- Scientific career
- Fields: Biologist

Kiril Tsochev Bratanov (Bulgarian: Кирил Цочев Братанов; 5 March 1911 – 16 October 1986) was a prominent Bulgarian biologist and pioneer in the area of immunology of reproduction.

== Education and early life ==
Kiril Bratanov was born on March 5, 1911, in the town of Lukovit, Bulgaria as the third son of Tsocho Bratanov Radkinski, a teacher from Yablanitsa. His oldest brother, Professor Bratan Bratanov, studied medicine and became one of the most prominent Bulgarian pediatricians of his time. His other brother, Dimitar Bratanov, studied law and served as diplomat, ambassador, and Member of the Bulgarian National Assembly. Due to his political convictions as a member of the Bulgarian Social Democratic Workers' Party (Broad Socialists), the father, Tsocho Bratanov, had difficulties securing a teaching position. The family lived in poverty on a vineyard on the outskirts of Lukovit.

After completing 6th grade in his hometown in 1928, Kiril Bratanov moved to the capital, Sofia, where he continued his studies at the 2nd Secondary School for Men (Втора софийска мъжка гимназия), graduating in 1930. He studied veterinary medicine at the University of Sofia and after receiving his doctoral degree in 1935, he spent two years as a veterinarian in the village of Dermantsi.

== Career ==
Bratanov's academic career began in 1940 when he became Assistant Professor at the Department of Physiology and Biochemistry at the School of Veterinary Medicine, University of Sofia. Between 1948 and 1976, he was Professor and Chair of the Department of Obstetrics and Artificial Insemination at the School of Zootechnology, University of Agricultural Sciences in Sofia. Kiril Bratanov also held positions as President of the University of Agricultural Sciences (1956-1962) and Vice-President of the Bulgarian Academy of Agricultural Sciences (1962-1972). From 1976 until his death in 1986, he was Director of the Department of Biological Sciences at the Bulgarian Academy of Sciences.

In 1967, he became a full member of the Bulgarian Academy of Sciences (Academician). He was also elected Honorary Member of the French Academy of Veterinary Sciences, the German Academy of Agricultural Sciences, the Belgian Royal Academy of Medicine, the Spanish Royal Academy of Veterinary Sciences, the Italian Society of Veterinary Science, and the Academy of Agricultural Sciences of the Soviet Union.

Between 1943 and 1986, Kiril Bratanov was director of the Institute of Biology and Immunology of Reproduction and Development of Organisms at the Bulgarian Academy of Sciences. Today the Institute of Biology and Immunology of Reproduction "Acad. Kiril Bratanov" bears his name in honor of his contributions to science.

In September 1967, Kiril Bratanov and his closest collaborators, after intensive correspondence with other researchers in reproductive immunology, convened the First Symposium on Immunology of Spermatozoa and Fertilization in Varna, Bulgaria. Participants from Austria, Australia, Belgium, Bulgaria, Czech Republic, Denmark, Germany, France, UK, Hungary, Italy, Norway, Netherlands, Romania, Sweden, USA, USSR, and Yugoslavia attended the symposium. The World Health Organization (WHO) and the Food and Agricultural Organization (FAO) were also represented. During the symposium, the International Coordination Committee for Immunology of Reproduction (ICCIR) was founded.

In 1969, ICCIR held a smaller meeting on "Immunology and Reproduction" at the WHO headquarters in Geneva and elected the ICCIR Steering Committee with Kiril Bratanov as president. The main aim of ICCIR has been to coordinate research in the area of reproductive immunobiology across the world and to periodically hold international symposia in Varna, Bulgaria, which have become a major forum in the area of experimental and clinical reproductive biology and immunology in humans and animals. In honor of its founder and past president, ICCIR awards the medal "Kiril Bratanov" (shown on the right) to researchers with outstanding contributions to reproductive immunobiology. The 15th International Symposium for Immunology of Reproduction was held in June 2018 in Varna, Bulgaria.

At the 3rd symposium on Immunology and Reproduction in 1975, the International Society for Immunology of Reproduction (ISIR) was founded at the proposal of Kiril Bratanov who was elected as its first president and served until 1983. At the 3rd ISIR Congress in 1986 in Toronto, Professor Rupert Billingham, an immunologist and one of the pioneers in organ transplantation, said:

"Let us never forget that, was it not for Bulgaria, was it not for our dear friend Kiril, we would have never gathered here as a research community to deal with such an important problem for humanity, the immunology of reproduction..."

== Death ==
In early October 1986, Bratanov participated in an international symposium in New Delhi, India. A week after his return, while preparing his opening address to the forthcoming Bulgarian-Egyptian Symposium on Biotechnologies in Reproduction, to be held in Varna, he suffered a heart attack and died on 16 October at the age of 75. Bratanov was buried at the Central Sofia Cemetery.

== Posthumous recognition ==
- Since 1987, the Institute of Biology and Immunology of Reproduction at the Bulgarian Academy of Sciences bears the name "Acad. Kiril Bratanov" in honor of Bratanov's contributions as the institute's director for more than 40 years.
- Bratanov is acknowledged as the Founding/Honorary President (Président d'Honneur) of the International Coordination Committee for Immunology of Reproduction and the International Society for Immunology of Reproduction.
- The Memorial Medal for outstanding scholarly contributions to the field of reproductive immunobiology, awarded by the International Coordination Committee for Immunology of Reproduction, is named after Bratanov.
- A portrait of Bratanov hangs in the lobby of the International House of Scientists in the Black Sea resort of Saints Constantine and Helena near Varna, Bulgaria.
- Bratanov is featured in a small exhibition at the Historical Museum of the Community Center (chitalishte) "Science 1901" in the town of Yablanitsa, Bulgaria.

Commemorative stamp featuring Bratanov and Nobel Laureate Robert G. Edwards

- In 2011, in honor of the 100th anniversary of his birth, the Bulgarian Ministry of Transport, Information Technologies and Communications issued a commemorative postal envelope with a special stamp featuring the image of Bratanov.
- Bratanov was included as one of the key figures in the exhibition "Founders and Scientists of the Bulgarian Academy of Sciences" organized as part of the Academy's 150th anniversary in October 2019.
- In honor of the Bulgarian Academy of Sciences' 150th anniversary celebrations in November 2019, the Institute of Biology and Immunology of Reproduction and Development of Organisms issued a commemorative postage stamp featuring a joint photo of Bratanov and future Nobel Laureate Robert G. Edwards.

== Honors and awards ==
- Laureate of the State Science Prize, 1948 (People's Republic of Bulgaria)
- Laureate of the Dimitrov Prize, 1951 (People's Republic of Bulgaria; awarded for achievements in science, technology and culture)
- Science Medal "M. V. Lomonosov", 1955 (Soviet Union)
- Medal "Lazzaro Spallanzani", 1964 (Italy; awarded by the Istituto Spallanzani, Milan)
- Order of Saints Cyril and Methodius 1st class, 1965 (People's Republic of Bulgaria)
- Foreign Member of the All-Union Academy of Agricultural Sciences "V. I. Lenin", since 1967 (Soviet Union)
- Medal "Bourget", 1967 (France)
- Joliot-Curie Medal of Peace, 1968 (World Peace Council)
- Honorary title "Meritorious Scientist" (заслужил деятел на науката), 1969 (People's Republic of Bulgaria)
- Order of the Czechoslovak Academy of Agricultural Sciences, 1970 (Czechoslovakia)
- Medal of the University of Illinois, 1970 (USA)
- Medal "I. Mechnikov", 1971 (Soviet Union; awarded by the USSR Academy of Medical Sciences)
- Foreign Member of the French Academy of Veterinary Sciences, since 1971 (France)
- Foreign Member of the German Academy of Agricultural Sciences, since 1971 (German Democratic Republic)
- Medal "S.I. Vavilov", 1972, and order "Knowledge", 1973 (Soviet Union; awarded by the All-Union Society "Knowledge")
- Order of Sukhbaatar, 1972 (People's Republic of Mongolia)
- Medal "N. Bauman", 1973 (Soviet Union; awarded by the Kazan State Academy of Veterinary Medicine "N. E. Bauman")
- Honorary title "People's Scientist" (народен деятел на науката), 1974 (People's Republic of Bulgaria)
- Medal "Louis Pasteur", 1978 (France; awarded by the French Society for Veterinary Medicine)
- Foreign Member of the Belgian Royal Academy of Medicine, since 1979 (Belgium)
- Medal "Louis Pasteur", 1980 (France; awarded by the Institut Pasteur)
- Foreign Member of the Spanish Royal Academy of Veterinary Sciences, since 1980 (Spain)
- Honorary Award of the Spanish Royal Academy of Veterinary Sciences, 1980 (Spain)
- Hero of Socialist Labor, 1981 (People's Republic of Bulgaria; awarded for exceptional achievements in agriculture, science, education, culture, and arts)
- Order "Georgi Dimitrov", 1981 (People's Republic of Bulgaria; awarded for exceptional merit)
- Medal "1300 Years since the Founding of the Bulgarian State", 1981 (People's Republic of Bulgaria)

== Selected works ==
- Bratanov, K. (1947). Stimulation of the mammary gland (Possibilities for stimulating the function of the mammary gland using hormones). Proceedings of the Chamber of National Culture. Series: Human and Veterinary Medicine, 2(1), 161-253.
- Bratanov, K., Gerov, K., and Todorov, T. (1950). On the formation of sperm antibodies in the organisms of domestic animals. Yearbook of the Agricultural Academy. Department of Veterinary Medicine, vol. 26 (1949–50), 321-334.
- Bratanov, K. (1951). Experiments on sheep X goat hybridization. Bulletin of the Institute of Experimental Veterinary Medicine, Sofia, 1, 224-227.
- Bratanov, K. (1969). Antibodies in the reproductive tract in the female. In Edwards, R. (ed.), Immunology and Reproduction, Proceedings of the International Symposium, Geneva, 1968. IPPF, London, pp. 175–189.

== Works about Kiril Bratanov ==
- Ermenkova, L., and Mollova, M. Kyril Bratanov: Biobibliography, Bulgarian Academy of Sciences, Sofia, 1984.
- Vulchanov, V. and Billington, W. (1987). Professor Kiril Bratanov (1911-1986). Obituary. Journal of Reproductive Immunology, 10, 177-178.
- Shulman, S. (1987). Kiril Bratanov (1911-1986). Obituary. American Journal of Reproductive Immunology and Microbiology, 13, 27-28.
- Voisin, G. (1987). Kiril Bratanov. Obituary, ISIR Newsletter, April, 1.
- Vulchanov, V. (1988). Kiril Bratanov's endeavour in laying the foundations of reproductive immunology. Human Reproduction, 3(1), 1-5.
