= Ivan Mihailov (general) =

Bulgarian soldier and politician

- Иван Михайлов

Minister of Defence of the Bulgarian People's Republic
- In office 9 June 1958 – 17 March 1962
- Preceded by: Petar Panchevski
- Succeeded by: Dobri Dzhurov

Personal details
- Born: February 22, 1897 Montana, Kingdom of Bulgaria
- Died: 16 May 1982 (aged 85) Sofia, People's Republic of Bulgaria
- Citizenship: Bulgaria
- Party: Bulgarian Communist Party
- Relatives: Hristo Mihaylov (brother)
- Education: Dzerzhinsky Military Technical Academy

Military service
- Allegiance: People's Republic of Bulgaria
- Branch/service: Soviet Army; Bulgarian People's Army
- Years of service: 1931 – 1945; 1961 – 1981
- Rank: General of the Army
- Battles/wars: World War II

Ivan Mihailov Popov (Bulgarian: Иван Михайлов Попов; 22 February 1897 - 16 May 1982) was a Bulgarian communist politician, military officer and statesman. He served in various positions in communist Bulgaria including minister of defence from 1958 to 1962. He was born in the town of Ferdinand (now Montana) on February 22, 1897. His older brother is the famous communist activist Hristo Mihaylov.

== Biography ==
Ivan graduated from the Vratsa Boys' Gymnasium in 1916. From September 1916, he stopped regular military service in Vratsa, during which he was transferred to the School for Reserve Second Lieutenants in Knyazhevo, Sofia. In May 1918 he was promoted to the rank of second lieutenant, and from August he was appointed head of the sound-metric command in the 16th artillery regiment of the 3rd Balkan infantry division. He graduated from higher legal education in 1921 and interned at the Lom District Court. He works as a lawyer in the law office of Zamfir Popov and Isai Ivanchev in the town of Ferdinand.

Member of the Bulgarian Social Democratic Workers' Party since 1919. Actively participated in the preparation of the September Uprising of 1923 in his native region, during which he was an insurgent commander. He emigrated to Yugoslavia after the defeat of the uprising, he was sentenced in absentia to 7 years and 6 months. deprivation of liberty under the ZPA. In June–September 1925, he worked illegally in Bulgaria to restore the party and military organizations of the BKP. He was sentenced to death under the Criminal Code on September 14, 1925. He left for Moscow by decision of the Foreign Bureau of the Bulgarian Communist Party.

In 1925-1930 he was a student at the Dzerzhinsky Dzerzhinsky Military Technical Academy in Leningrad, who graduated as an "artillery engineer" with a specialty in "ballistics". Trained in the 11th Artillery Regiment in Leningrad. Served from 1931 to 1939 in the Main Artillery Directorate of the Red Army. From 1939 to 1945, he worked at the Tambov Artillery Technical School as a senior teacher and head of the educational department. He was made Engineer-Colonel in 1944 and awarded the Order of the Red Star, March 29, 1944. He was discharged from the Soviet Army on June 26, 1945.

Ivan Mikhailov Popov arrived in Bulgaria on July 16, 1945, as a colonel in the Red Army. On August 15, 1945, he was appointed Chief of the Ordnance Department of the General Staff of the Ministry of War and was promoted to the rank of major general. In 1947, he was appointed as the first commander of the Bulgarian artillery in the newly created Artillery Command under the Ministry of Defence. In 1950, he was appointed deputy minister of national defense and on February 9 of the same year, he was promoted to the rank of lieutenant general. Since 1951, he had been a member of the Main Military Council.

He was elected by the National Assembly as vice-chairman, subsequently as deputy-chairman of the Council of Ministers continuously, in all governments from January 4, 1951, to July 9, 1971, during which time he also held the following positions:

Minister of Transport and Communications from 1 February 1957 to 9 June 1958, chairman of the Committee on the Peaceful Uses of Atomic Energy from 1957 to 1959. Minister of Defence from 9 June 1958 to 17 March 1962 head of the Civil Defense from 9 June 1962 to 1971, deputy chairman of the State Defense Committee from 1957 to 1973. He was also a member of the newly created supreme state body, the State Council of the People's Republic of Bulgaria, from July 8, 1971, to June 18, 1981.

Political offices
Preceded by Petar Panchevski	Minister of People's Defence of Bulgaria; 9 June 1958 – 17 March 1962	Succeeded by Dobri Dzhurov
