= Petar Panchevski =

Bulgarian politician (1902–1982)

- Петър Панчевски

Minister of Defence of the People's Republic of Bulgaria
- In office 27 May 1950 – 9 June 1958
- Preceded by: Georgi Damyanov
- Succeeded by: Ivan Mihailov

Personal details
- Born: January 25, 1902 Butan, Kingdom of Bulgaria
- Died: 17 November 1982 (aged 80)
- Citizenship: Bulgaria
- Party: Bulgarian Communist Party
- Education: Kuybyshev Military Engineering Academy
- Occupation: General, politician

Military service
- Allegiance: People's Republic of Bulgaria
- Branch/service: Bulgarian People's Army

Petar Pavlov Panchevski (Bulgarian: Петър Павлов Панчевски; January 25, 1902 - November 17, 1982) was a communist Bulgarian politician who served as the Minister of Defence of the People's Republic of Bulgaria.

== Biography ==
Petar Panchevski was born on January 25, 1902, in the village of Butan, Vrachan region (today part of Kozloduy Municipality). In 1921, he graduated from high school in Oryahovo. He graduated from a pedagogical school in Lom in 1923. He taught for some time in his native village. He was a member of the Komsomol since 1919, and of the Bulgarian Communist Party since 1924. He participated in the September Uprising in a combat unit. After its suppression, he emigrated to Yugoslavia.

From September 1925 he was in the Soviet Union, where he was known as Pyotr Georgievich Pavlov. He graduated from the Military Engineering School in Leningrad in 1929 and the Kuybyshev Military Engineering Academy in Moscow (1936). After that, he became the chief of staff of a sapper battalion in the 70th motorized rifle division. He participated in the Spanish Civil War in 1937 as a specialist. He took part in the Defense of Madrid and in the Battle of Jarama. From the spring of 1938, he was the chief of engineering troops of the Siberian Military District. The beginning of the Second World War found him as the commander of the engineering troops of the Siberian Military District. During the Second World War, he was the chief of engineering troops of the 24th Army. The army was encircled in October 1941, but he escaped and became Chief of Engineers of the Fifth Army. From May 1942, he was the commander of a group of special engineering battalions for large operational enclosures. In August of the same year, he left for the North Caucasus, but his plane was shot down.

After he recovered in November 1942, he became the head of the engineering courses for the improvement of the command staff. From June 1943, he was the commander of the XII assault engineer-sapper brigade at the Reserve of the Supreme High Command. The brigade was assigned to the 4th Ukrainian Front in October 1943 and participated in the Battle of Melitopol. Later, he participated in the battles in Romania, Yugoslavia, Hungary and Austria as the commander of the XII assault engineer-sapper brigade. He entered the war with the rank of lieutenant colonel and left the Red Army with the rank of major general.

He returned to Bulgaria in 1945. On August 15 of the same year, he was appointed commander of the 1st Infantry Sofia Guards Division. From October 7, 1947, he was the commander of the first tank unit in the Bulgarian People's Army. From October 1949, he was commander of the First Army and Deputy Minister of National Defense. From 1950 to 1958 he was the Minister of Defence of the People's Republic of Bulgaria. It is the basis of the arrest of generals Slavcho Transki, Dencho Znepolski and others, on the charge of being associates of Traicho Kostov. Transki was arrested in the office of Minister Panchevski, on his order.

Panchevski was a deputy to the National Assembly from 1950 to 1961. From 1958 to 1962 he served as the ambassador to the People's Republic of China. After his return to Bulgaria, he retired due to reaching the age of 60.

There were reports that Panchevski was the instigator of the attempted coup d'état by Ivan Todorov-Gorunya in 1965, when leader Todor Zhivkov was on visit to Vratsa. He began an almost open struggle with Zhivkovism, as he called Todor Zhivkov's regime.

He was awarded the title Hero of Socialist Labour (1967), Hero of the People's Republic of Bulgaria (1972), Order of Georgi Dimitrov (1955, 1972, 1977, 1982), Order of the People's Republic of Bulgaria 1 st (1954) and 2 st (1964), "People's Freedom 1941 - 1944" and the Soviet Order of the Red Banner and Order of the Red Star. He was awarded the Marshal's Star for Army Reserve General (8 May 1978).

He died under unknown circumstances in Sofia on November 17, 1982.

Political offices
Preceded by Georgi Damyanov	Minister of People's Defence of Bulgaria; 27 May 1950 – 9 June 1958	Succeeded by Ivan Mihailov
