= Anyu Angelov =

Bulgarian politician (born 1942)

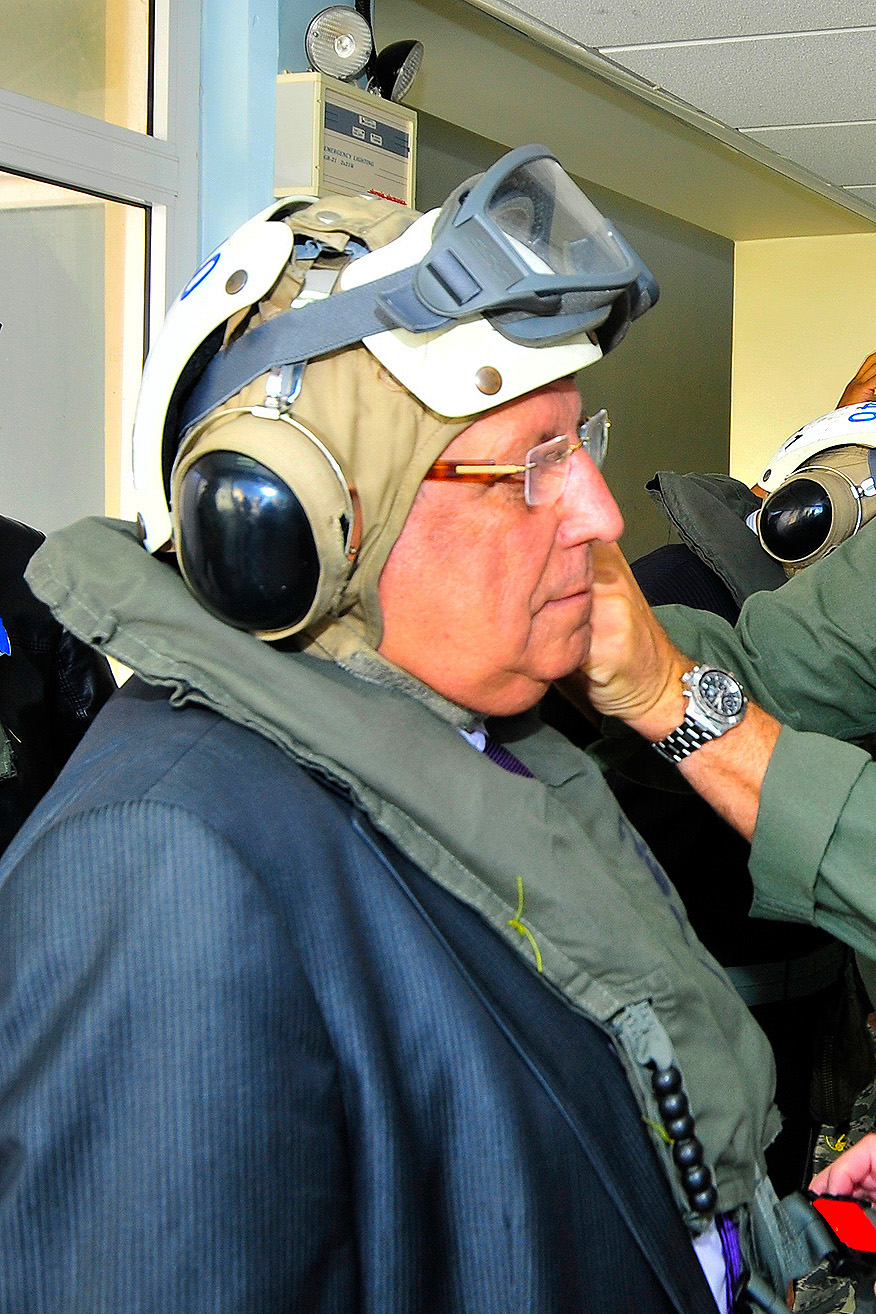

Anyu Angelov (Bulgarian: Аню Ангелов) (born 22 December 1942 in Haskovo) was Bulgaria's Minister of Defense between 2010 and 2013. Born in Haskovo on 22 December 1942. He graduated from the National Military Artillery School "Georgi Dimitrov" (now Faculty "Artillery, Air Defense and Communications" at NMU) with a degree in radio electronics engineer. He then studied at the Military Academy "Rakovska" under the program of operational and strategic direction of the armed forces. He specialized in the Military Academy of the General Staff of the Armed Forces of the USSR in Moscow. Began his military career as a platoon leader. Later he became Chief of Staff, Commander of the Brigade. From 1987 he was Head of Staff, and between 1990 and 1992 - commander of the air defense (PVO) of the Land Forces. From 1992 to 1994 he was Deputy Commander of the Land Forces. In the period 1994-1997 was Deputy Chief of the General Staff of the Bulgarian Army. Between 1997 and 2000 he was a defense attaché in the UK. Then became head of the Military Academy "G. S. Rakovski "(until 2002). Became a member of the GOP "GERB" which allows him political development and was appointed Deputy Minister of Defense. On 27 January 2010 formally took office as Minister of Defense.

== Life ==
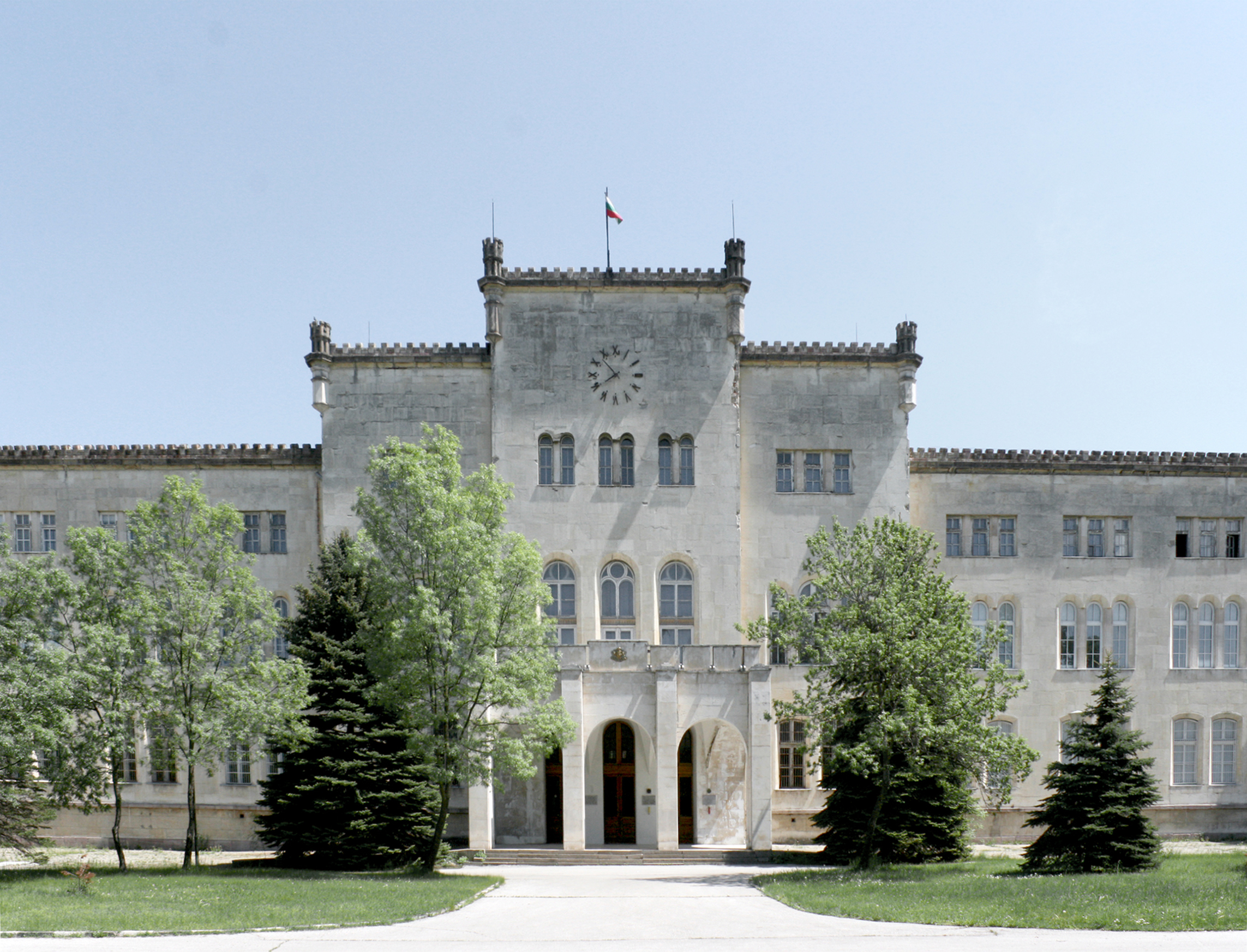
The Rakovski Defence and Staff College in Sofia

Angelov started his career as Commander of an autonomous platoon, and was later appointed Department Deputy Chief at the Land Forces Air Defense Command, Chief of Staff and Brigade Commander. From 1987 to 1990 he was Land Forces Air Defense Chief of Staff, and from 1990 to 1992 he served as Land Forces Air Defense Commander in Chief. Until 1994 Angelov was Deputy Commander in Chief of the Bulgarian Land Forces, and from December 1994 to September 1997 he was Deputy Chief of the General Staff of the Bulgarian Armed Forces. From November 1997 to August 2000, Angelov was Defense Attaché of the Republic of Bulgaria to the United Kingdom of Great Britain and Northern Ireland. Later on, until February 2002, he was Commandant of the Rakovski Defence and Staff College. For a short period of time in 2002, he was also Director for Defense Planning at the Ministry of Defence. On 27 January 2010, he became Bulgaria's Minister of Defense and served until 13 March 2013.

Political offices
Preceded by Nickolay Mladenov	Minister of Defence of Bulgaria; 27 January 2010 – 13 March 2013	Succeeded by Todor Tagarev
