= Yordan Mutafchiev =

Bulgarian politician

- Йордан Мутафчиев
- Born: 17 November 1940; Byala Voda, Burgas Province, Kingdom of Bulgaria
- Died: 24 May 2015 (aged 74); Sofia, Bulgaria
- Alma mater: Frunze Military Academy
- Military career
- Allegiance: People's Republic of Bulgaria
- Branch: Bulgarian People's Army
- Service years: 1961–1993
- Rank: Army General

Yordan Zhekov Mutafchiev (Bulgarian: Йордан Жеков Мутафчиев; 17 November 1940 – 24 May 2015) was a Bulgarian communist politician, military officer and statesman. He served in various positions in communist Bulgaria including Minister of Defence.

== Military career ==
He graduated from the Commercial High School in Burgas in 1958, the Frunze Military Academy with honors in 1976 and the Voroshilov Military Academy of the General Staff in 1984. He last served as Commander of the 3rd Army in Sliven from 1987 – 1989. In December 1989, he was appointed Deputy Minister of Defense. On December 27, 1989, he was relieved of his post as army commander and appointed Deputy Minister of Defense. On November 22, 1990, he was elected Minister of Defense in the second government of Andrey Lukanov, holding the position in the government of Dimitar Popov until November 8, 1990. On August 22, 1991, while serving as Minister of Defense, he was awarded the rank of Army General and was awarded the military decoration "Marshal's Star" for Army General.

From November 8, 1991, to February 1, 1993, he held the position of Chief Inspector of the Armed Forces and demonstratively did not stand when the lower-ranking Colonel General, Chief of the General Staff, Lyuben Petrov, entered the meetings (who was promoted to the rank of Army General only on February 1, 1993, when Mutafchiev retired).

== Retirement ==
On February 1, 1993, he was dismissed from active duty and transferred to the reserves. He completed 3-month diplomatic courses at the Diplomatic Institute. From June 1993 to July 1997 he was Ambassador of the Republic of Bulgaria to North Korea. He was removed from the reserve in 2005 at the age of 65.

He co-founded of the Union of Bulgarian Nationalists "All Bulgaria", founded on March 3, 2006. At the founding meeting he was elected Deputy Chairman of the National Executive Council. On July 22, 2006, the National Political Council of the party nominated him for vice president along with the presidential candidate Grigor Velev. He also served as leader of Russophiles for the Revival of the Fatherland. Army General Mutafchiev passed away on May 24, 2015.

== Military ranks ==
- Junior Lieutenant – September 1, 1961
- Lieutenant – September 2, 1963
- Senior Lieutenant – October 12, 1966
- Captain – September 29, 1971
- Major – July 24, 1976
- Lieutenant Colonel – September 5, 1981
- Colonel – October 2, 1985
- Major General – September 7, 1986
- Lieutenant General – September 8, 1988
- Colonel General – September 6, 1990
- Army General – August 22, 1991

Political offices
Preceded by Dobri Dzhurov	Minister of Defence of Bulgaria; 22 November 1990 – 8 November 1991	Succeeded by Dimitar Ludzhev
