= Ivan Lesovoy =

Ivan Martynovich Lesovoy
- Иван Мартынович Лесовой

Minister of War
- In office 24 April 1882 – 3 July 1882
- Monarch: Alexander of Battenberg
- Prime Minister: John Casimir Ehrnrooth
- Preceded by: Vladimir Krylov
- Succeeded by: Alexander Kaulbars

Personal details
- Born: Ivan Martynovich Lesovoy; 22 November 1835
- Died: Unknown
- Awards: Order of St. George

Military service
- Allegiance: Russian Empire; Principality of Bulgaria
- Branch/service: Imperial Russian Army
- Years of service: 1857—?
- Rank: Major General
- Battles/wars: Russo-Turkish War

Ivan Martynovich Lesovoy (Russian: Иван Мартынович Лесовой, 22 November 1835 – Unknown) was a Russian Imperial Army general who fought in the Russo-Turkish War and served as the Minister of War of the Principality of Bulgaria.

== Biography ==
Ivan Lesovoy joined the Russian Imperial Army on 20 July 1857. He commanded the artillery of the Bulgarian Land Forces between 10 November 1879 and 28 August 1883. He was a lieutenant colonel during his term. In 1882 Lesovoy became the acting war minister of Bulgaria and the general-adjutant of the Prince of Bulgaria. Later that year he returned to Russia. From 1885 to 1893, Lesovoy was in command of the 39th Artillery Brigade of the 39th Infantry Division.

== Rank history ==
- Ensign (1.10.1858)
- Junior Lieutenant (14.09.1860)
- Guards Ensign (30.07.1862)
- Guards Junior Lieutenant (30.08.1862)
- Guards Lieutenant (4.10.1863)
- Guards Staff Captain (16.04.1867)
- Guards Captain (30.08.1870)
- Guards Colonel (31.03.1874)
- Major General (21.04.1881)

== Awards ==
- Order of St. George (4th class)

Political offices
| Preceded by Vladimir Krylov | Minister of War of Bulgaria; 24 April 1882 – 3 July 1882 | Succeeded by Alexander von Kaulbars |
