= Vladimir Krylov (general) =

Imperial Russian Army general

Vladimir Vasilyevich Krylov
- Владимир Васильевич Крылов
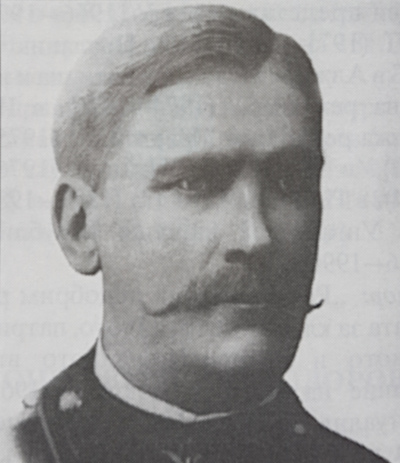

Minister of War
- In office 1 July 1881 – 12 April 1882
- Monarch: Alexander of Battenberg
- Prime Minister: John Casimir Ehrnrooth
- Preceded by: John Casimir Ehrnrooth
- Succeeded by: Ivan Lesovoy

Personal details
- Born: Vladimir Vasilyevich Krylov; 1830
- Died: April 1885 (aged 54–55)

Military service
- Allegiance: Russian Empire; Principality of Bulgaria
- Branch/service: Imperial Russian Army
- Years of service: 1843–1885
- Rank: Major General
- Battles/wars: Crimean War; Russo-Turkish War

Vladimir Vasilyevich Krylov (Russian: Влади́мир Васи́льевич Кры́лов, Bulgarian: Владимир Крилов; 1830 – April 1885) was a Russian Imperial Army general who served as the Minister of War of the Principality of Bulgaria (1881–1882).

== Biography ==
Vladimir Krylov's family originated in the Vyatka Governorate.

In 1843–1865, he served in the St. Petersburg Grenadier Regiment as a podpraporshchik. In 1853, he served in the Tomsk Regiment and fought in the Crimean War. He participated in the defense of Sevastopol.

As a major, Krylov took part in putting down a Polish uprising.

In 1869–1881, he commanded the 24th Simbirsk Infantry Regiment, with which he fought in the Russo-Turkish War (1877–1878).

In April 1881 Krylov was promoted to major general. The next year he served as the Minister of War of the Principality of Bulgaria. It was on his initiative that several laws were introduced to and passed by the National Assembly of Bulgaria.

He left the Russian Imperial Army due to sickness and died in 1885.

Political offices
Preceded by Johan Ehrnrooth	Minister of War of Bulgaria; 13 July 1881 – 24 April 1882	Succeeded by Ivan Lesovoy
