= Chavdar Djurov =

Bulgarian pilot (1946–1972)

Chavdar Djurov (Dzhurov, Bulgarian: Чавдар Джуров, 31 May 1946 – 14 June 1972) was a Bulgarian pilot who in 1965 set the world record of the highest night parachute jump of 15.3 kilometres (9.5 mi).

Djurov's father, Dobri Djurov, was a high-ranked military official, who between 1962 and 1990 served as the Defense Minister of Bulgaria. Chavdar Djurov studied at the Georgi Benkovski Aviation School in Bulgaria, and then at the Zhukovsky Air Force Engineering Academy in the Soviet Union.

In 1965, he set the world record in parachute night jump, together with Georgi Filipov and Hinko Iliev. The record was registered; however, the International Aeronautics Federation decided that such jumps were too dangerous and prohibited them, so the record still stands.

In June 1972, Djurov died in an airplane crash together with Ventseslav Yotov, during a trial flight of an L-29.
