= Atanas Zapryanov =

Bulgarian general and politician

- Атанас Запрянов
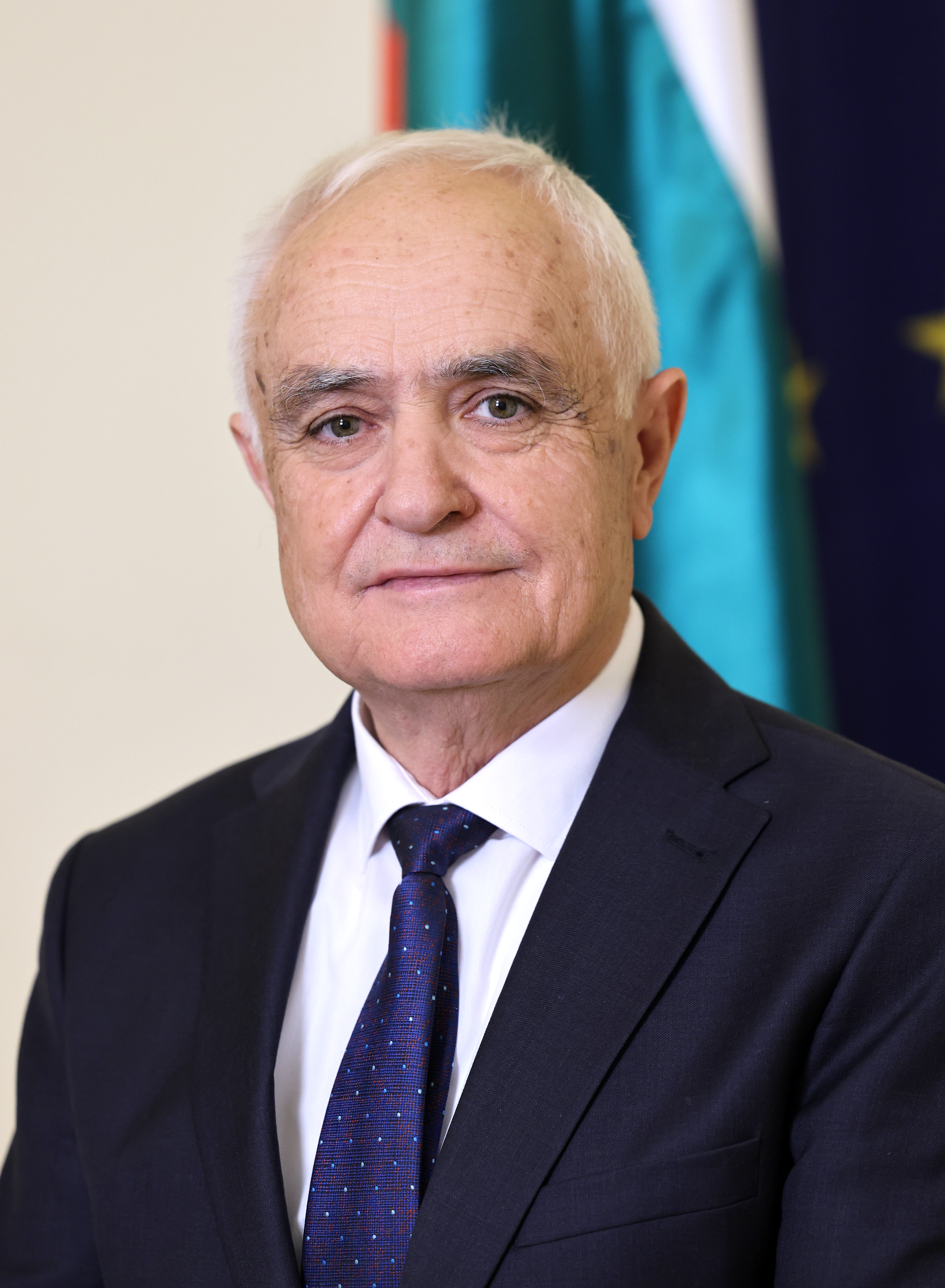
- Official portrait, 2024

Minister of Defence
- In office 9 April 2024 – 6 May 2026
- Prime Minister: Dimitar Glavchev; Rosen Zhelyazkov; Andrey Gurov
- Preceded by: Todor Tagarev
- Succeeded by: Dimitar Stoyanov

Personal details
- Born: Atanas Dimitrov Zapryanov; 16 April 1950 (age 76) Dragoynovo, PR Bulgaria
- Party: Independent
- Education: Vasil Levski National Military University
- Occupation: Politician; military expert; military general

Military service
- Allegiance: Bulgaria
- Branch/service: Bulgarian Armed Forces
- Rank: Lieutenant general

Atanas Dimitrov Zapryanov (Bulgarian: Атанас Димитров Запрянов; born 16 April 1950) is a Bulgarian politician who served as Minister of Defence from 2024 to 2026. A political independent, he has previously served as Deputy Minister of Defence and has held important positions within the military ranks.

Political offices
Preceded by Todor Tagarev	Minister of Defence of Bulgaria; 9 April 2024 – 8 May 2026	Succeeded by Dimitar Stoyanov
