= Dimitar Ganev =

Bulgarian politician

- Димитър Ганев

Chairman of the Presidium of the National Assembly
- In office 30 November 1958 – 20 April 1964
- Preceded by: Georgi Damyanov
- Succeeded by: Georgi Traykov

Personal details
- Born: 28 October 1898; Gradets, Bulgaria
- Died: 20 April 1964 (aged 65); Sofia, Bulgaria
- Political party: Bulgarian Communist Party
- Profession: Politician

Dimitar Ganev Varbanov (Bulgarian: Димитър Ганев Варбанов) (28 October 1898 – 20 April 1964) was a Bulgarian communist politician. He became the Chairman of the Presidium of the National Assembly of Bulgaria (nominal head of state of Bulgaria) on 30 November 1958, shortly after the death of Georgi Damyanov, and served in that capacity until his own death on 20 April 1964.

Political offices
Preceded by Georgi Damyanov	Chairman of the Presidium of the National Assembly; 30 November 1958 – 20 April 1964	Succeeded by Georgi Traykov
