= Todor Tagarev =

Bulgarian military expert and politician

- Тодор Тагарев
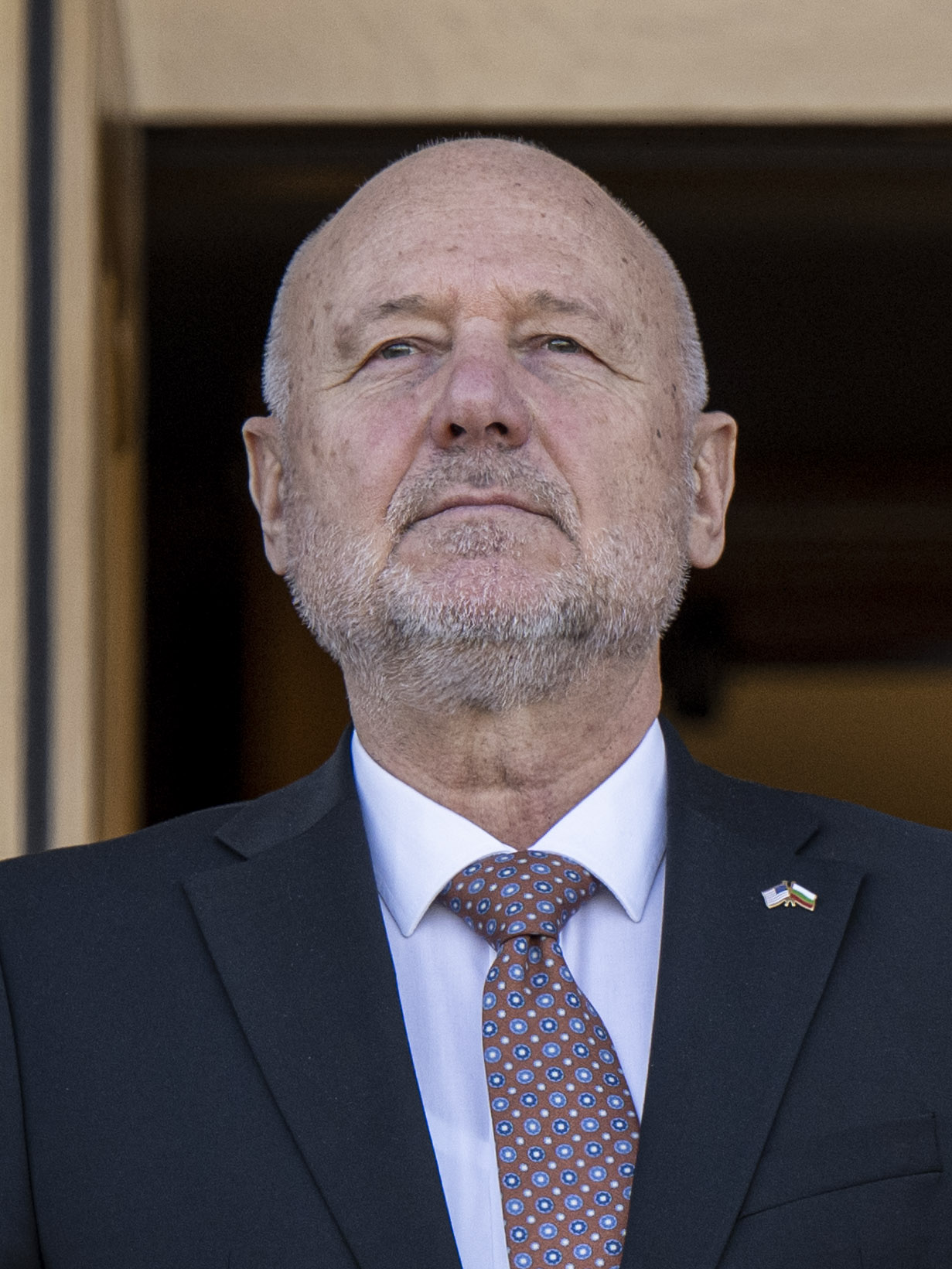
- Tagarev in 2024

Minister of Defense
- In office 6 June 2023 – 9 April 2024
- Prime Minister: Nikolai Denkov
- Preceded by: Dimitar Stoyanov
- Succeeded by: Atanas Zapryanov
- In office 13 March 2013 – 29 May 2013
- Prime Minister: Marin Raykov
- Preceded by: Anyu Angelov
- Succeeded by: Angel Naydenov

Personal details
- Born: Todor Dimitrov Tagarev; 18 April 1960 (age 66) Stamboliyski, PR Bulgaria
- Party: Independent
- Children: 3
- Education: Zhukovsky Air Force Engineering Academy (PhD); Air Command and Staff College
- Occupation: Politician; professor; military expert

Military service
- Allegiance: Bulgaria
- Branch/service: Bulgarian Air Force
- Years of service: 1982-1994
- Rank: Major

Todor Dimitrov Tagarev (Bulgarian: Тодор Димитров Тагарев; born 18 April 1960) is a Bulgarian politician who served as Minister of Defense in 2013 and from 2023 to 2024. A political independent, he is a military expert with widely recognised academic credentials.

== Early life and education ==
Todor Tagarev was born in Stamboliyski on 18 April 1960. He graduated from the Kiril Popov Mathematics school in Plovdiv, after which he obtained an Engineer's degree in telemechanics from the Georgi Benkovski Higher Airforce Institute in Dolna Mitropoliya. He then proceeded to defend a dissertation at the Zhukovsky Air Force Engineering Academy in Moscow and at the Air Command and Staff College in the USA.

== Professional career ==
From 1982 to 1986, Tagarev served as an Air Weapons Officer with the Twenty-fifth Fighter-Bomber Regiment of the Air Force of Bulgaria at Cheshnegirovo. He was a lecturer at the Georgi Benkovski Airforce Institute from 1989 to 1992. From 1994 to 1998 he was a research worker at the Institute of Management and Systems Research and the Institute of Space Research of the Bulgarian Academy of Sciences, where he continued to work as a senior research worker from 2002 to 2004. From 1999 to 2001 he was the director of the Defence Planning Directorate and the Armaments Policy Directorate in the Ministry of Defense. From 2004 to 2008 he was the head of the Department of Defense Management at the Georgi Rakovski Military Academy. From 2005 to 2008 Todor Tagarev was a member of the NATO Research and Technology Board and a national representative in its Systems Analysis and Research Panel. In September 2009 – 2010 he was Advisor to the Minister of Defense on Strategic Defence Management. In 2016-2107, he served as Director of the Defence Institute of the Bulgarian MoD and national representative in the Board of the NATO Science and Technology Organization.

He has considerable experience in leading and participating in international and national interdisciplinary research on security and defence issues. His scientific and applied publications have been translated into Arabic, Armenian, Bahasa, Georgian, Dari, Spanish, Portuguese, Romanian, Russian, Serbian, Ukrainian, Hungarian and French. Since 2008 he has been in the Institute of Parallel Information Processing of the Bulgarian Academy of Sciences, now the Institute of Information and Communication Technologies, as Head of the Information Technology in Security Section and the Centre for Security and Defence Management.

Since 2014, he is a full professor in the Institute of Information and Communication Technologies.

Prof. Tagarev is member of the European Leadership Network and the European Council of Foreign Relations.

== Political career ==
Tagarev was first appointed as the Minister of Defense by President Rosen Plevneliev on 13 March 2013 as part of the Caretaker Government of Marin Raykov.

=== Denkov Government Tenure ===
On 6 June 2023 Tagarev was sworn in as the new Minister of Defense as part of the newly formed Denkov Government. He defined as his main priorities strengthening the country’s defence capabilities, supporting Ukraine, and countering Russia’s hybrid influence.

==== Investing in advanced defence capabilities ====
Under the lead of Minister Tagarev, the Ministry of Defence developed a ten-year program for the defence investments with an estimated value of close to 10 billion Euro. It was adopted by Denkov’s Cabinet in November 2023 and introduced for parliamentary approval. In parallel, the Ministry of Defence signed a contract for acquiring combat and support vehicles of the Stryker family for one mechanized brigade, finalized the tender procedure for acquiring advanced 3D radars, launched a cyber defence operations center, etc.

To ensure the development of defence capabilities and meet the Defence Pledge from the 2104 Wales NATO Summit, the Denkov Cabinet increased the defence expenditures with over 60% from 2022 to 2024, i.e., from 1.55 to 2.05% of the GDP. In both 2023 and 2024, the salaries of the armed forces personnel were increased by 10% on average.

Bulgaria’s defence posture was clearly set within NATO and EU defence policies and plans. Tagarev announced plans to invest in the infrastructure for hosting the NATO Multinational Battle Group, led by Italy and in implementation of NATO's Enhanced Forward Presence and the NATO pipelines network. Further, he announced governmental plans to invest six billion Euro in upgrading the country’s military mobility infrastructure to provide for rapid transfer of allied troops and equipment in case of need.

To strengthen the security in Black Sea, in January 2024, Bulgaria, Romania, and the Republic of Türkiye signed an agreement to launch a joint Mine Countermeasures Task Force (MCM TF).

==== Support to Ukraine ====
At the start of his term, Tagarev stated that, in a sharp break from the policies of the previous caretaker Governments, appointed by the then President Rumen Radev, the Denkov Cabinet will join international initiatives to provide military support Ukraine. This support included the delivery of locally produced ammunitions of all calibers by one of the biggest of ammunitions industries in Europe, working 24/7, encouraging direct sales to end-users in Ukraine, speeding up the delivery of ammunitions from military warehouses, the delivery of over 100 armoured personnel vehicles BTR-60PB, etc. Later, and article in Deutsche Welle claimed that “Tagarev himself put together one of the most comprehensive military aid packages of Soviet-era arms for Ukraine — in the greatest confidentiality.”

Although the types and volumes of military equipment delivered from army warehouses to Ukraine remain classified, at a press conference towards the end of his tenure, Tagarev declared that the support to Ukraine remains an indisputable priority of the Cabinet which, with parliamentary support, has delivered over 7,000 tons of materiel, including millions of ammunitions of various types and calibers. Seeking partial reimbursement from allies, his stated ambition was to generate in this way one billion levs (over 500 million Euro) in addition to the defence budget and to reinvest the received amounts to speed up the process of military rearmament. At the beginning of 2025, then Prime Minister Rossen Zhelyazkov announced that the MOD has received 348 million levs from Denmark as a compensation for Bulgaria’s military assistance to Ukraine.

At a joint press conference in Odesa, Tagarev and Ukraine’s defence minister Oleksii Reznikov discussed international efforts for mine clearance at sea. The launch of the Mine Counter Measures Task Force by the three Black Sea littoral allies will contribute to securing Ukrainian exports of grain and other civilian goods, as well as to the safety of the Ukrainian ports and coastline.

Tagarev repeatedly defined the support to Ukraine as an investment in Bulgaria’s and the European security and called for better coordinated and predictable EU efforts. In an interview for the national radio he stated, “I have personally been saying for several years that aid to Ukraine is an investment in our own security, that is, this is not just aid or a moral commitment that we strive to fulfill, but indirectly supports our own security.”

==== Protecting against disinformation and other tools of hybrid influence ====
In the summer of 2023, Russia’s Black Sea Navy announced naval exercises with live fires in a big part of the sea, including 80% of Bulgaria’s Exclusive Economic Zone (EEZ) and extended the notification several times for approximately six months in total. Tagarev publicly defined those Russian actions as a provocation, escalatory in nature, endangering the safety of maritime traffic and blocking the exploration for hydrocarbons in Bulgaria’s EEZ in the Black Sea.

According to Tagarev, Russian disinformation, amplified by local media sources and pro-Kremlin parties in Parliament, had a significant negative impact on the recruitment in the Bulgarian Armed Forces and the military academies.

In a January 2024 talk to the Atlantic Council of the United States, Minister Tagarev argued for revising history textbooks to present the history of the relations between Bulgaria and Russia objectively, in their complexity. For this and other public statements, he was included among the “rusophobs” in the official list of Russia’s Ministry of Foreign Affairs. The pro-Kremlin parties in the National Assembly (Bulgaria’s Parliament) continuously attacked Minister Tagarev and called for his resignation “at least weekly”. Two example follow.

==== Crashed drone at Tyulenevo ====
On the night of the 17th of September, a military-use drone, which was 3m in length and carried an 82mm mine-explosive was marooned on the shore of Bulgaria in the coastal town of Tyulenovo. On the morning of the 18th of September, the drone was de-activated by a team of explosive experts, who cordoned off the area.

In an initial briefing at the Ministry of Defense, Tagarev underlined that the drone had not been caught by the Air-Defense Radars and had most likely been marooned to the shore of Bulgaria.

During an emergency briefing at the Parliamentary Defense Committee, Tagarev confirmed that the drone was "most likely" connected to the Russian invasion of Ukraine, being marooned to the coast of Bulgaria after an estimated 2 weeks of being downed. Tagarev claimed that it was impossible to establish whether the drone was of Russian or Ukrainian origin. He further stated that all protocol in regards to the handling of explosive devices were maintained while removing the explosive and handling the drone.

The opposition parties (Vazrazhdane, BSP, ITN) called on Tagarev to resign, accusing the MoD of a slow reaction time and a lack of professionalism. Co-chair (at the time) of the DPS Parliamentary Group, Delyan Peevski, similarly demanded an explanation for the minister about the drone. Vice President Iliana Iotova, similarly called the response of Tagarev "unsatisfactory". Tagarev, in turn, called the demands for his resignation unreasonable.

During an interview on the 24th of September, 6 days after the incident, Tagarev underlined the fact that the origin of the drone remained unknown, although its presence in Bulgarian territorial waters was "most likely" unintentional, and defended the work of the explosive experts in carrying out the controlled explosion.

==== Yordanov Day Controversy ====
During Yordanov Day, traditionally held on the 6th of January, it is customary for a blessing of the Bulgarian Armed Forces battle banners to take place, under the supervision of the President, Cabinet Ministers, Members of the Committee for Defense and National Security and Chairs of the Parliamentary Groups.

During the celebration of Yordanov Day in 2024, an invite was not extended by the Ministry of Defense to any Members of Parliament, with the exception of the Chairman of the National Assembly, Rosen Zhelyazkov, who demanded the Minister of Defense explain the omission. Tagarev's office initially denied that protocol was breached and claimed that all invitations were released. However, in a later statement it was confirmed that a mistake had been made by the staff member responsible for the release of invitations, with the staff member subsequently resigning their position within the Ministry.

Head of the DPS group in the Bulgarian Parliament, Delyan Peevski accused Tagarev of "humiliating" the Bulgarian parliament and later called on Targarev to "take personal responsibility" instead of "hiding behind innocent staff-workers". BSP MP, Borislav Gutsanov, claimed that this was "another example why this person is a threat to our country's national security" and called on Tagarev to resign.

Targarev's behaviour as Minister was defended by the responsible staff member, who took full responsibility for the error and called Tagarev "the most competent and honourable Minister of Defense". Prime Minister Nikolai Denkov similarly defended the Minister, claiming that the "political offensive" against him had nothing in common with "a mistake by a staff member" and that Tagarev had a positive contribution to the modernization of the Bulgarian Armed Forces.

Political offices
Preceded by Anyu Angelov	Minister of Defence of Bulgaria; 13 March 2013 – 29 May 2013	Succeeded by Angel Naydenov
Preceded by Dimitar Stoyanov	Minister of Defence of Bulgaria; 6 June 2023 – 9 April 2024	Succeeded by Atanas Zapryanov
