= Georgi Damyanov =

Bulgarian politician (1892–1958)

- Георги Дамянов

Chairman of the Presidium of the National Assembly
- In office 27 May 1950 – 27 November 1958
- Preceded by: Mincho Neychev
- Succeeded by: Dimitar Ganev

Minister of People's Defence
- In office 22 November 1946 – 27 May 1950
- Preceded by: Kimon Georgiev (as Minister of War)
- Succeeded by: Petar Panchevski

Personal details
- Born: 23 September 1892 Lopushna, Principality of Bulgaria
- Died: 27 November 1958 (aged 66) Sofia, Bulgarian People's Republic
- Party: Bulgarian Communist Party
- Profession: Politician

Georgi Purvanov Damyanov (Bulgarian: Георги Първанов Дамянов; 23 September 1892 – 27 November 1958) was a Bulgarian communist politician.

Damyanov was born in Lopushna, near Ferdinand (today Montana), Bulgaria and joined the Bulgarian Social Democratic Workers' Party (Narrow Socialists) in 1912, which later became the Bulgarian Communist Party. He served as Defence Minister during the first stage of Bulgaria's communist regime, from 1946 to 1950. On 27 May 1950 he was elected as the Chairman of the Presidium of the National Assembly (nominal head of state of Bulgaria). He served in that position for 8 years, until his death. He died in Sofia, Bulgaria. During his time in office much of the power was held by the first secretaries of the party, first Vulko Chervenkov and then by Todor Zhivkov.

Political offices
Preceded by Mincho Neychev	Chairman of the Presidium of the National Assembly; 27 May 1950 – 27 November 1958	Succeeded by Dimitar Ganev
Political offices
Preceded by Kimon Georgiev	Minister of People's Defence of Bulgaria; 22 November 1946 – 27 May 1950	Succeeded by Petar Panchevski
