= Yordan Milanov (general) =

Major General of the Bulgarian Air Force (1924–2020)

Yordan Milanov Major general
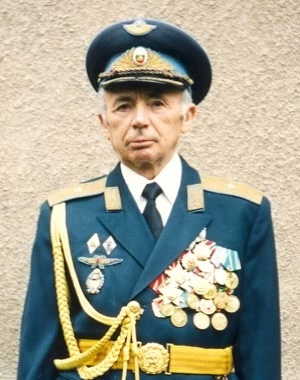
- Major general Milanov in 2000
- Born: November 20, 1924; Sofia, Bulgaria
- Died: June 27, 2020 (aged 95); Sofia, Bulgaria
- Military career
- Allegiance: Bulgaria
- Branch: Bulgarian Air Force
- Service years: 1947–1985
- Rank: Major general

Major general Yordan Sergiev Milanov (Bulgarian: Йордан Сергиев Миланов; November 20, 1924 – June 27, 2020) was a major general of the Bulgarian Air Force. He was a recognized author, Bulgarian Aviation and Aerospace Doctor of Science, and a Bulgarian Air Force pilot. With over 60 publications regarding Air- and Space- Force history, tactics, and geopolitical issues, Maj. Gen. Milanov was one of Bulgaria's most prolific 20th century military aviation leaders. Maj. Gen. Milanov died of natural causes in the early morning hours of June 27, 2020, in his home in Sofia, Bulgaria.

== Biography ==
=== Early life and education ===
Yordan Milanov was born on November 20, 1924, in Ivanyane (Bankya), a suburb of Sofia, Bulgaria. In 1935, he graduated from National High School Father Paisius, continuing his education and eventually graduating from National Secondary High School Prince Roman Tarnovski in 1938. He was drawn to Aviation at an early age, graduating from the Kazanlak Pilot School in 1945 at age of 21, with a grade point average of 95.3%. Milanov continued his education by graduating the Georgi Benkovski National Air Force Academy in 1947 (grade point average 99.3%), the Georgi Rakovski Military Academy in 1958, and the Military Academy of the General Staff of the Armed Forces of the Soviet Union in 1965. Upon graduation in Russia in 1965, Officer Milanov received the class's only Gold Medal Distinction Diploma, personally signed by then Marshal of the Soviet Union, Matvei Zakharov.

=== Military career ===
In over 40 years of distinguished Military service, Maj. Gen. Milanov held a number of command posts in Bulgaria, including bombing, attack and fighter aviation leadership. His journey began on September 15, 1943, when Milanov was drafted to serve as a young soldier on the military airport in Bozhurishte. After graduating in 1947, he continues service as a Lieutenant pilot in the Bulgarian Air Force's Twelfth Assault Aviation Regiment, part of the Second Assault Division commanded by Colonel Kiril Kirilov. Soon, Milanov was promoted to Second Squadron Navigator, and shortly afterwards to Regiment Navigator.

In the period of 1961–1963, he was Chief of staff of Tactical Aviation. Afterwards, in the years of 1969 – 1972, he worked as Chief of Staff of Anti-aircraft warfare and the Bulgarian Air Force. Between 1974 and 1985, as part of the Bulgarian Ministry of Defence, he served as the Chief inspector for both anti-aircraft warfare and the Bulgarian Air Force.

=== Interkosmos Program ===
Milanov was Chief of staff of the National Commission in the Bulgarian cosmonaut program and a working member of Interkosmos, the Russian International Space Program, where he worked on the Soyuz 33 Crewed Space Flight Program, and the Mir EP-2 Visiting Expedition as part of the 1978 Interkosmos Selection. His program contributions were instrumental in putting the first Bulgarian astronauts into space, Georgi Ivanov (April 10, 1979) and Aleksandr Aleksandrov (June 7, 1988).

=== Retirement ===
Following 40 years of service, at the age of 60, Maj. Gen. Milanov retired in late 1985 in Sofia, Bulgaria. Since his retirement, he has continued with his scientific work until approximately the age of 92. His post-retirement work resulted in a multitude of documented gatherings of facts and research, as well as the publication of numerous articles, opinion columns, interviews, and several printed books.

== Books and publications ==
Maj. Gen. Milanov is a well-known author, frequently cited in military and aviation-themed publications.

The focus of his publications and research is mainly in the domain of tactics and operational art of the Air Force, aviation history, and applications in the use of space for military purposes.

=== The Air Forces of Bulgaria During the 1912–1945 Wars (2008) ===
ISBN 978-954-752-125-4The book is an expanded and updated compilation of three previously unpublished writings by the Author, titled "The Aviation and Aeronavigation of Bulgaria During the 1912–1945 Wars". The Author writes in the book's foreword: "My hope is that this book, targeting a wide array of readers, will shed a brighter light on the history of our Aviation in one of its most important roles – military use".

The book comprises four chapters, describing the Bulgarian participation by air in the Balkan Wars (1912–1913: Chapter I), World War I (1915–1918: Chapter II), World War II during the Bulgarian participation in the Tripartite Pact (March 1, 1941 – September 4, 1945, Chapter III), and World War II post the Bulgarian participation in the Tripartite Pact (September 9, 1944 – May 9, 1945). The book is based on heavily researched facts, sourced directly from the Bulgarian Central Military Archive, as well as publications from Bulgarian magazines such as Military Journal, Military – Technical Thought, Airspace Review, Flier; Bulgarian newspapers such as Military News and National Defense, and an array or foreign books such as Wings of Judgment: American Bombing in World War II and Fifteenth Air Force Story.

=== Military Space a Quarter of a Century Ago (2012) ===
ISBN 978-619-7027-01-3The book was originally supposed to be released in 1987; however, due to political turmoil and related events, it didn't become published until late 2012, after being updated by now co-writer Veselin Stoyanov. It addresses the many facets of military use in space, especially in light of the United States – Soviet Union (USSR) Space Race. The Author revisits events around the launch of Sputnik 1, the April 1961 flight of Yuri Gagarin, and overall development of the US and USSR Space Programs in that period. A special attention is also given to the Interkosmos program, as well as the development of the Bulgarian cosmonaut program and Bulgarian astronauts Georgi Ivanov and Aleksandr Aleksandrov. An accent is also made in regards to the evolution in the area of strategic space control and warfare.

=== 21st Century and the War (2014) ===
ISBN 978-619-7027-04-4The book is a 2nd revision of a previously released book bearing the same title. The Author writes in the book's foreword: "This book aims to showcase, if possible in great detail, the basic ideas of some of the most well-known names in various national schools of thought and their viewpoints in geopolitical and military science".

The book comprises two parts: A retrospective of the 20th century and a forecast of the 21st century's first quarter (Part One) and an in-depth, all-encompassing look into contemporary warfare (Part Two). The Author draws inspiration and facts from an array of sources, as well as publications from world-renowned figures such as Jacques Attali, Zbigniew Brzeziński, Briam Beedham, Aleksandr Dugin, Herfried Münkler, Vladimir Slipchenko, and Wesley Clark.

== Orders, honors, and awards ==
- Medal, "For Participation In The Patriotic War 1944–1945" (Awarded June 15, 1948)
- Medal, "For Honorable Service To The Armed Forces Of The People's Republic Of Bulgaria" 1st Class (Awarded September 12, 1961)
- Medal, "For Honorable Service To The Armed Forces Of The People's Republic Of Bulgaria" 2nd Class (Awarded September 2, 1963)
- Medal, "20th Anniversary Of The Bulgarian People's Army" (Awarded April 1, 1964)
- Medal, "Twenty Years of Victory in the Great Patriotic War 1941–1945" (Awarded May 7, 1965)
- Medal, "Military Academy of the General Staff of the Armed Forces of Russia" (Awarded June 26, 1965)
- Medal, "25th Anniversary Of The Bulgarian People's Army" (Awarded June 1, 1969)
- Award, "Preparation and Completion of Military Training Granit-72" (Awarded August 8, 1972)
- Medal, "30th Anniversary Of The Bulgarian People's Army" (Awarded September 17, 1974)
- Medal, "Order Of The 9 September 1944" 1st Class (Awarded November 3, 1974)
- Medal, "100th Anniversary Of Liberation From Ottoman Rule 3 March 1878 – 3 March 1978" (Awarded March 2, 1978)
- Medal, "1300 Anniversary of Bulgaria" (Awarded October 18, 1981)
- Medal, "100th Anniversary Of The Birth Of Georgi Dimitrov" (Awarded June 21, 1982)
- Medal, "40th Anniversary Of Socialist Bulgaria" (Awarded September 27, 1984)
- Medal, "Order Of The People's Republic Of Bulgaria" 1st Class (Awarded November 20, 1984)
- Medal, "Forty Years of Victory in the Great Patriotic War 1941–1945" (Awarded April 12, 1985)

== See also ==
- Georgi Ivanov
- Aleksandar Aleksandrov
- Bulgarian cosmonaut program
