= Veselin Bliznakov =

Bulgarian politician

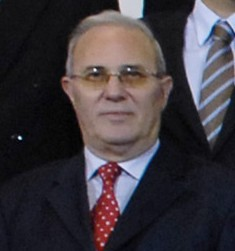
Veselin Bliznakov at the NATO Defense Ministerial in Brussels, 2007

Vesselin Bliznakov (Bulgarian: Веселин Близнаков) (born 18 June 1944) is a Bulgarian politician.

Bliznakov was born in the town of Straldzha, Yambol Province, and graduated from the Higher Medical Institute in Sofia in 1969. He continued his education with a course of study at the Reserve Officers Training School Gotse Delchev in Vratsa. He completed the course in 1970 and became a reserved officer. In addition in 1981, he submitted a doctor's dissertation in “The Influence of Ionized Rays on the Health of Medical Staff Working in the Environment of Ionized Rays”. In 1986, Dr. Bliznakov became Associate Professor in Radiation Protection.

His political career began in 2001, when he was elected MP representing NDSV at the 39th National Assembly from 6th Multi-Seat Constituency – Vratsa. Until 2005, he was chair of the Energy Parliamentary Committee, member of the Foreign Policy, Defence and Security Parliamentary Committee, and member of the joint parliamentary committee Bulgaria-EU. From July 2001 to July 2003, he was deputy chair of the NMSII's parliamentary group.

In June 2005, Bliznakov was again elected as an MP representing the NDSV, however this time it was at the 40th National Assembly from 27th Multi-Seat Constituency – Haskovo.

On 16 August 2005, Bliznakov was elected Minister of Defence of the Republic of Bulgaria. He took this office on 17 August 2005. Nikolaj Zonew succeeded as Minister of Defence in 2008 and Bliznakov backs in Parliament.

He is married.

Political offices
| Preceded by Nikolay Svinarov | Minister of Defence of Bulgaria; 17 August 2005 – 24 April 2008 | Succeeded by Nikolai Tsonev |
