= Dimitar Ludzhev =

Bulgarian politician and economist

- Димитър Луджев

Personal details
- Born: 27 March 1950 (age 76) Burgas, Bulgaria
- Profession: Politician, Economist

Dimitar Petrov Ludzhev (Bulgarian: Димитър Петров Луджев) (born 27 March 1950) is a Bulgarian politician and economist who served as vice-Prime Minister in the Dimitar Popov government between 1990 and 1991 and Minister of Defence in the Filip Dimitrov cabinet from 1991 to 1992.

== Life ==
Ludzhev was born in Burgas and graduated with a degree in political economy and sociology from the UNWE, which was prior to 1990 known as "Karl Marx" Higher Institute of Economics (Bulgarian: Висш икономически институт "Карл Маркс"). He has also worked for the history institute of the Bulgarian Academy of Sciences.

Between 1990 and 1992, Ludzhev was a member of the UDF, but after that founded his own parties and political coalitions such as the Union for National Salvation (Bulgarian: Обединение за национално спасение).

Ludzhev holds a doctorate in the field of history and is the author of numerous scientific publications. He has made specializations in Poland and the United States.

Political offices
Preceded by Yordan Mutafchiev	Minister of Defence of Bulgaria; 8 November 1991 – 20 May 1992	Succeeded by Aleksandar Staliyski
