= Georgi Rakovski Military Academy =

Bulgarian military academy

Coordinates: 42°41′0″N 23°18′26″E

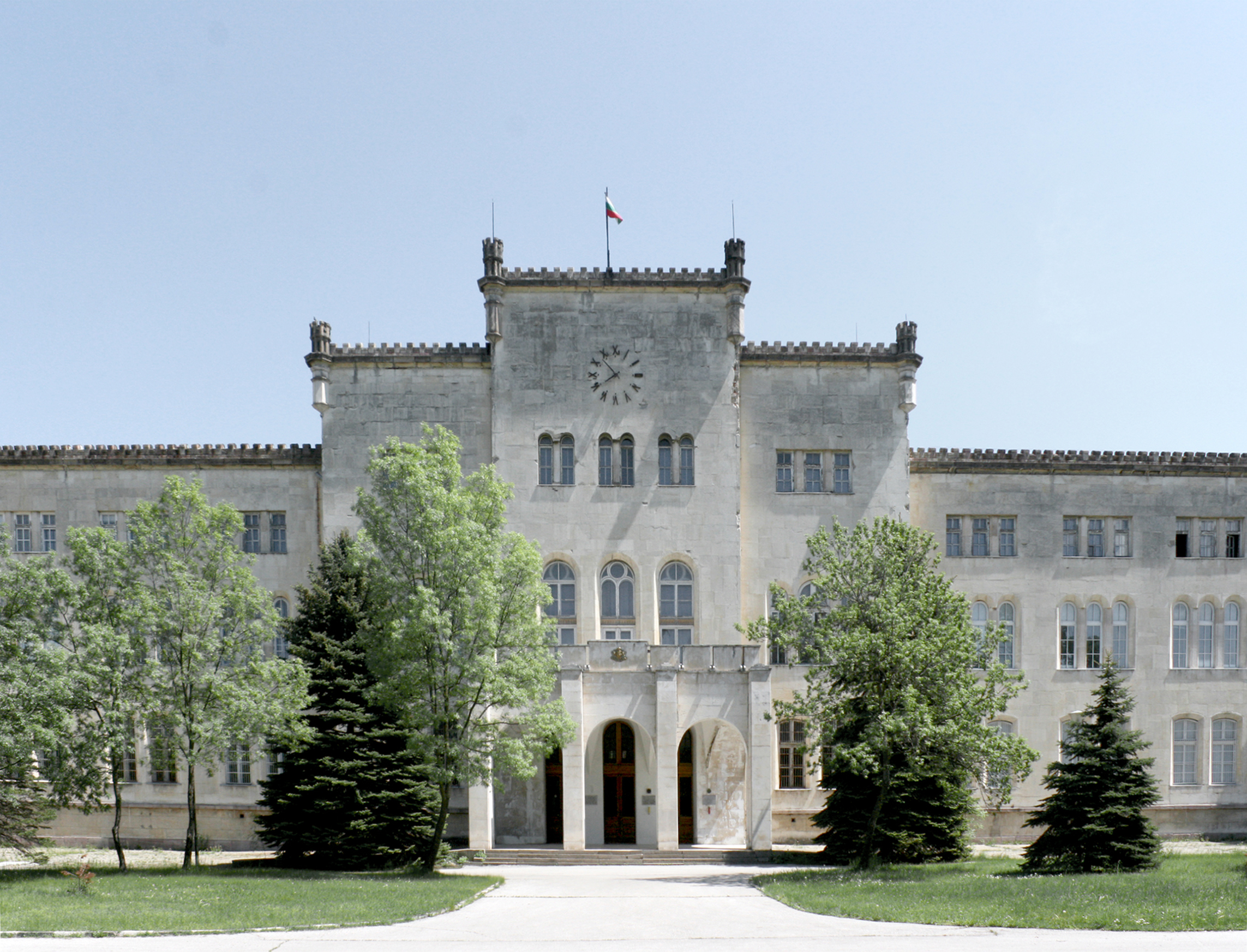
- Type: Military Academy
- Established: 1912
- Students: 1500
- Location: Sofia, Bulgaria
- Website: Official Website

The Georgi Rakovski Military Academy (Bulgarian: Военна академия „Георги Стойков Раковски“), based in Sofia, is Bulgaria's oldest military institution of higher education. It is named after Bulgarian revolutionary Georgi Sava Rakovski.

== History ==
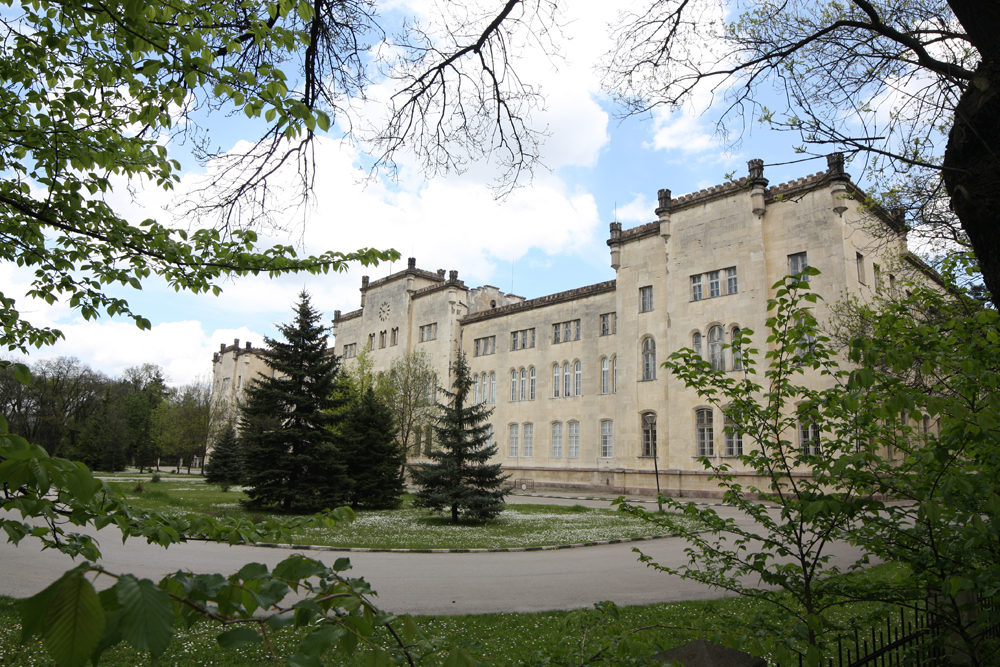

In December 1911, the Minister of War, Major General Nikifor Nikiforov, submitted to the National Assembly a draft law for the establishment of a military academy. On 12 December 1911 (Old Style), the minister's report was approved by Ferdinand I. The National Assembly passed the bill on 1 March 1912, and on 20 April, Tsar Ferdinand I, by Decree No. 26, ratified the Law on the Military Academy. The law was published in the State Gazette on 8 May 1912, marking the official beginning of the Military Academy. In June of the same year, the academy's regulations, curriculum, and entrance examination instructions were approved. Initially, the academy was organised into an administration, three student courses, and a cavalry half-squadron. The personnel numbered 35, excluding the half-squadron. The teaching staff consisted of full-time and part-time lecturers: the former were graduates of higher military education, while the latter included scholars from Sofia University and instructors from the Military School in Sofia. The first premises of the academy were in a rented building at the corner of San Stefano Street and Veliko Tarnovo Street in Sofia. Due to the outbreak of the First Balkan War (1912–1913), the academy was formally opened only in 1914. In the summer of 1913, its first head was appointed—Colonel of the General Staff Asen Papadopov.

Training of the first class began on 4 January 1915 in the presence of Tsar Ferdinand and the academy's head, Colonel Stanchev. The academy consisted of two departments: General and Intendance. From 1930, officer admission took place every two years, and from 1935, annually. In 1932, a three-month course was established for officers who had graduated from higher technical schools abroad. Between 1922 and 1944, the academy graduated 16 classes, including 16 general staff and 11 intendance classes. During this period, 521 officers were trained, including 10 foreigners. From 1 February to 18 September 1944, the academy was evacuated to Lovech, returning to Sofia soon after.

By Decree No. 6 of 5 March 1946, and in accordance with the Minister of War's report No. 32 of 18 February that year, the academy was named after the prominent Bulgarian National Revival figure and revolutionary Georgi Rakovski, founder of the First Bulgarian Legion—the forerunner of the modern Bulgarian Army. In the 1949/50 academic year, the regular course of study became two years, while the correspondence course became three years. In 1956, the regular course was extended to three years, remaining so until 1976, when in several profiles it was shortened to two years; by 1978, all profiles adopted the two-year format.

In 1951, the academy adopted a new structure consisting of a command, political department, training division, full-time and correspondence faculties, higher academic course, control group, drill department, and rear services. Three years later, the first four doctoral students were admitted. By Decree No. 215 of 1952, the Presidium of the National Assembly presented the academy with a battle flag. In the mid-1950s, the academy was merged with the existing Military Technical and Military Political Academies, expanding its faculties to five: General Forces, Military Political, Armoured, Artillery, and Air Force. By 1970, the academy's command and teaching staff numbered 300, administrative and support staff 350, and students about 800. At that time, it also began training specialists from Yemen, Cuba, the USSR, and Vietnam.

In 1978, a new statute was adopted for the School for the Training of Personnel under the Reconnaissance Directorate of the Bulgarian Army (SHTP-RD), granting it the status of a Special Faculty for Strategic Intelligence within the academy. Located in Bankya, the faculty comprised three departments: “Special and Military Training”, “Language Training”, and “Operational Technology”. Its head held a rank equivalent to a division commander. The faculty also accepted doctoral candidates, with over 10 dissertations on intelligence topics defended by 1991.

After the fall of the communist regime in 1989, the Military Political Faculty was closed in 1990, and contacts were established with NATO's military research structures. Organisationally, the academy was reduced from four faculties in 1989 to two by 1994 (Operational-Tactical and Postgraduate Qualification). In 1993, the two-year course was extended to three years until 1995, after which it was shortened to 18 months.

According to the 2004 reform plan, from 23 April 2003 the academy adopted a new structure consisting of a command, two faculties, a department, an institute, five divisions, and one service unit. At that time, its personnel included 102 officers, 17 sergeants, and 197 civilians.

Since its creation, the academy has served as the main institution for the training of military commanders and personnel in Bulgaria and the primary one in the field of national security and military science, as well as NATO operational compatibility. The academy trains 1,500 officers and civil individuals a year and has 148 qualified lecturers. It is headed by Major-General Stayko Prokopiev since 2024.

== Structure ==
- Head: Major General Stayko Prokopiev
- Deputy Head for Administration and Logistics: Colonel Emil Yanev
- Deputy Head for Education and Research: Colonel Assoc. Prof. Dr. Dimitar Tashkov

== Units ==
- Faculty of National Security and Defence — Dean: Colonel Assoc. Prof. Dr. Georgi Dimov
- Command and Staff Faculty — Dean: Colonel Assoc. Prof. Dr. Emil Enev
- Institute for Advanced Defence Studies — Director: Prof. Mitko Stoykov
- Department of Distance Learning, Language Training and Qualification — Director: Colonel Assoc. Prof. Dr. Petko Dimov

== Names ==
- Military Academy (1914–1922)
- Teaching Academy (1922–1938)
- Military Academy (1938–1946)
- Georgi Rakovski Military Academy (since 1946)
- Combined Arms Georgi Rakovski Military Academy (since 1954)

== Heads ==
- Asen Papadopov (1913)
- Stanyu Topalov (1913)
- Ivan Stoykov (1913–1914)
- Konstantin Stanchov (1914)
- Konstantin Georgiev (1919)
- Vasil Atanasov (1919–1922)
- Nikola Nyagulov (1922–1927)
- Todor Radev (1927–1929)
- Yordan Peev (1929–1930, 1934–1935)
- Ivan Todorov (1930–1934)
- Svetoslav Popov (1935–1936)
- Nikola Hadjipetkov (1936, 1936–1938)
- Asen Kraev (1936, acting)
- Kiril Yanchulev (1938–1940)
- Nikola Kostov (1940, 1943–1944)
- Ivan Popov (1940–1943)
- Dimitar Savov (1944)
- Iliya Stamenov (1944–1945)
- Petar Tonchev (1945–1946)
- Boyan Byanov (1946)
- Petar Hadzhiivanov (1946–1948)
- Asen Krastev (1948–1951)
- Slavcho Trunski (1951, 1954–1962)
- Ivan Kinov (1951–1954)
- Velko Palin (1962–1964)
- Geno Genov (1964–1972)
- Tako Krastev (1972–1977)
- Aleksandar Mitev (1977–1983)
- Nikola Nedyalkov (1983–1987)
- Ivan Stefanov (1987–1990)
- Hristo Hristov (1991–1992)
- Dimitar Krastev (1992–1993)
- Kiril Ermenkov (1993–1997)
- Metodi Gelev (1997–2000)
- Anyu Angelov (2000–2001)
- Ivan Simeonov (2001–2002, acting)
- Atanas Zapryanov (2002–2003)
- Evgeni Manev (2003–2008)
- Georgi Georgiev (2008–2011)
- Dimitar Angelov (2011–2014)
- Mitko Petev (2014–2015)
- Todor Dochev (2015–2016, 2022–2024)
- Grudi Angelov (2016–2022)
- Stayko Prokopiev (since 2024)

== Park ==
The Military Academy park, open to the public since 2010, features landscaping maintained by the Ministry of Defence. In its centre is a gazebo and a stone lion sculpture dating from the interwar period.

== Alumni ==
- Yordan Milanov (officer)

== See also ==
- Vasil Levski National Military University
