= Medal "1300th Anniversary of Bulgaria" =

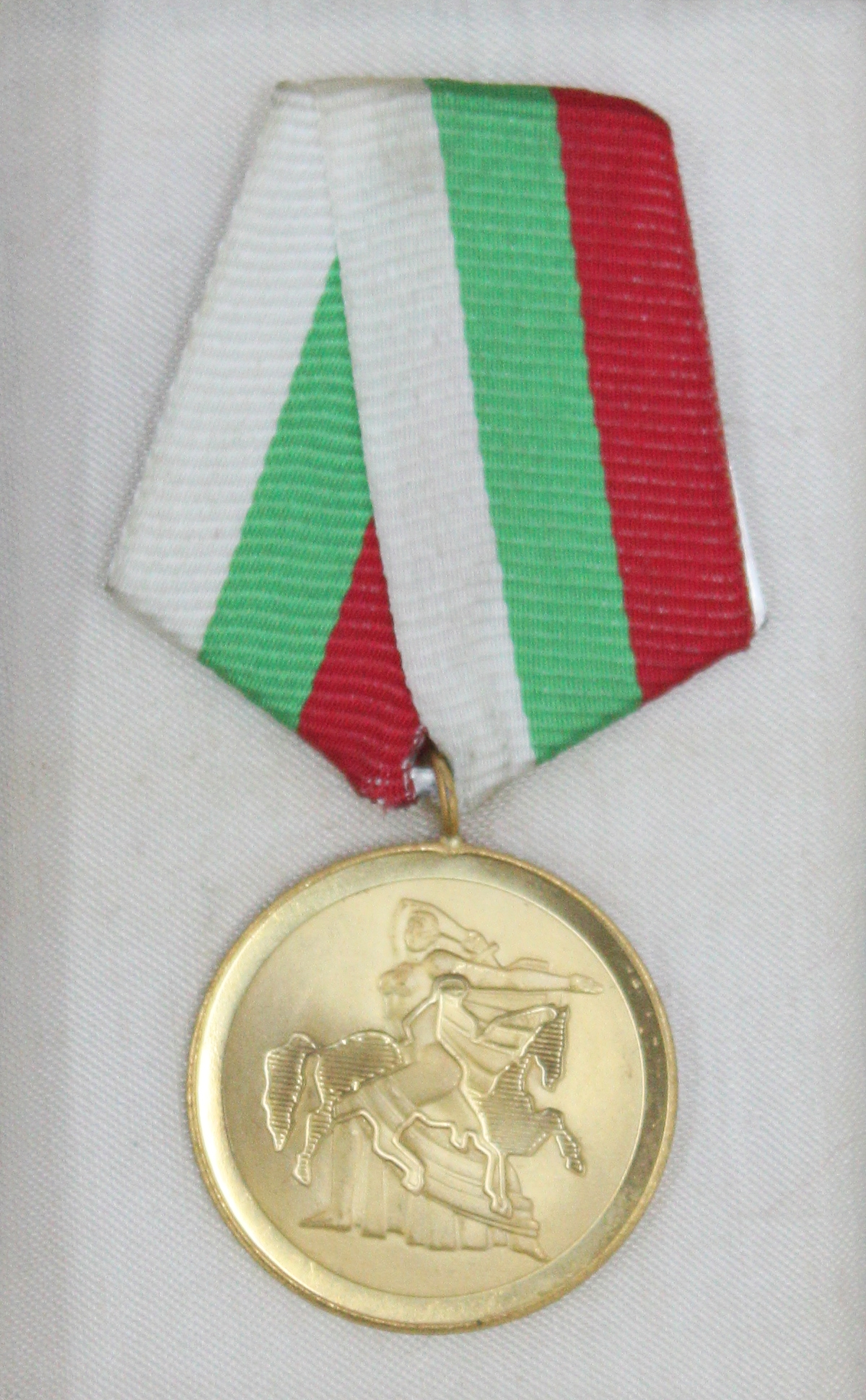
- Type: Honorary title
- Awarded for: awarded to deserving prominent citizens
- Country: People's Republic of Bulgaria
- Presented by: the State Council of the People's Republic of Bulgaria
- Eligibility: Bulgarian and allied citizens
- Status: No longer awarded
- Established: October 16, 1981
- First award: October 16, 1981
- Final award: 1991

Highlights
- Total: 110954

The Medal "1300th Anniversary of Bulgaria". Established in 1981, it was awarded until 1990. It was awarded to deserving prominent citizens in honor of the 1300th Anniversary of the Bulgarian State.

== Notable recipients ==
- Todor Zhivkov - Politician
- Nicolai Ghiaurov - Opera Singer
- Yordan Milanov - Major General of the Bulgarian Air Forces
