= Nikolay Svinarov =

Bulgarian politician

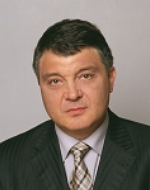

Personal details
- Born: 6 May 1958 (age 68) Shoumen, Bulgaria
- Profession: Politician, Attorney

Nikolay Avramov Svinarov (Bulgarian: Николай Аврамов Свинаров) (born 6 May 1958) is a Bulgarian politician who served as the Minister of Defence in the Sakskoburggotski cabinet between 2001 and 2005.

== Life ==
Born in Shoumen, Svinarov completed his legal studies at Sofia University in 1982 and subsequently worked as an attorney.

He was a member of the 39th and 40th National Parliaments.

On 24 July 2001, Svinarov assumed his duties as Minister of Defense in the Sakskoburggotski government and fulfilled his full mandate, stepping down on 17 August 2005.

Between 5 December 2007 and 25 June 2009, he held the position of chairman of the parliamentary group of Bulgarian New Democracy (Bulgarian: Българска нова демокрация).

Political offices
Preceded by Boyko Noev	Minister of Defence of Bulgaria; 24 July 2001 – 17 August 2005	Succeeded by Veselin Bliznakov
