= Gozli Ata =

Shrine in Turkmenistan

Coordinates: 40°20′03″N 54°29′15″E

Gozli Ata is one of the remotest shrines of Turkmenistan, devoted to the eponymous saint.

== Shrines ==
The Gozli Ata mausoleum is a brick building with twin white domes and sparsely ornamented walls. The entrance is designed in the form of pishtak; inside lies Sufi Gözli Ata in a triangular prism coffin of extraordinary length. The premises contains numerous stone-tombs of Turkmen tribes. Adjacent to this mausoleum, also lies the ruins of a madrasa and the mausoleum of Bibi Aysulu, who was the wife of Gözli Ata.
