= Bulgarian People's Army =

Army of the People's Republic of Bulgaria

- Българска народна армия Bulgarska Narodna Armiya
- War flag of Bulgaria (1971-1990)
- Motto: За нашата социалистическа родина! Za nashata sotsialisticheska rodina! "For our socialist motherland!"
- Founded: 1952
- Disbanded: 1990
- Service branches: Bulgarian Land Forces; Bulgarian Air Force; Bulgarian Navy
- Headquarters: Sofia

Leadership
- General Secretary: Petar Mladenov (last)
- Minister of People's Defence: Yordan Mutafchiev (last)
- Chief of the General Staff: Hristo Dobrev (last)

Personnel
- Conscription: Yes
- Active personnel: 152,000 (1989)
- Deployed personnel: Czechoslovakia

Industry
- Foreign suppliers: Soviet Union

Related articles
- History: Warsaw Pact invasion of Czechoslovakia

The Bulgarian People's Army (Bulgarian: Българска народна армия, БНА, romanized: Balgarska narodna armiya, BNA) was the army of the People's Republic of Bulgaria. It comprised the Bulgarian Land Forces, Air Force and Air Defence, Navy and supporting arms. Bulgaria was one of the signatories of the Warsaw Pact. Along with troops from other Warsaw Pact countries, the BNA participated in the Warsaw Pact invasion of Czechoslovakia in 1968. However, other than this, the BNA did not see any combat during its existence. The Bulgarian People's Army was dissolved along with the People's Republic of Bulgaria in 1990 and was succeeded by the Bulgarian Armed Forces.

== History ==
=== Early years and activities during the 50s ===
The pro-Soviet Bulgarian Fatherland Front seized power on 9 September 1944, after a coup d'état. After the proclamation of the People's Republic of Bulgaria in 1946, the celebration of the military holiday on 6 May was stopped, with the date of 23 September designated as the Day of the Bulgarian People's Army. Its significance lies in it being the day of the staging of the September Uprising in 1923. The first military parade of the People's Army held on the occasion of the coup's anniversary. The new army was reorganized on the Soviet model with the direct participation of Soviet officers, equipped with Soviet weapons and equipment. Communist resistance groups such as NOVA were integrated into the new army, with leading positions occupied by Soviet officers of Bulgarian origin. Much of the command staff was trained in the Soviet Union. In the autumn of 1949, the BCP leadership sent a request to send a Soviet officer to the post of Chief of General Staff, but was refused by the Soviet government. In 1952, it was officially named the Bulgarian People's Army. It advised North Korea in the Korean War and provided medical assistance to the troops of North Korea.

=== Invasion of Czechoslovakia ===
It joined the Warsaw Pact on May 14, 1955 and activities in the alliance included the Warsaw Pact Invasion of Czechoslovakia. As early as May 1968, the BNA's Main Political Directorate launched a propaganda campaign to explain to the army the events in Czechoslovakia. Immediate military training began in early July, and by the end of the same month it was being carried out in Bulgaria under the control of Soviet officers. Two designated units (the 12th Motorized Rifle Regiment and 22nd Artillery Regiment, led by Colonel Alexander Genchev and Colonel Ivan Chavdarov respectively) were then transferred to Soviet territory, where they passed under Soviet command. Military and ideological preparations ended on August 20, when the Council of Ministers decided that the country should take part in the intervention in Czechoslovakia.

The units were sent to Ivano-Frankivsk and stayed there until the invasion began. On 20 August 1968, the regiments received a combat order signed by the Minister of People's Defence Dobri Dzhurov and the Chief of the General Staff Atanas Semerdzhiev. That day, at 06:00, the 22nd Motorized Rifle Regiment (as part of the Soviet 7th Guards Airborne Division) was ordered to enter Czechoslovakia and capture the airports at Prague and Vodochody. Among the other tasks was to find all Bulgarian citizens temporarily residing in the country and to take them out. On September 13, Czechoslovak Defence Minister Martin Dzúr issued an oral note demanding that the Bulgarian military presence be withdrawn. It lasted until October 22, 1968, after a bilateral agreement between Czechoslovakia and the USSR had been concluded six days earlier. On October 23, 1968, the Bulgarian contingent that invaded the country withdrew from Czechoslovakia.

=== Assistance to Soviet allies ===
The BNA advised the Viet Cong during the Vietnam War. During the 1950s, 60s and 70s the BNA assisted Algeria, South Yemen, Libya, Iraq, Nicaragua, Egypt, and Syria. In Vietnam, Bulgaria committed themselves to sending military supplies free of charge to North Vietnam in a bilateral agreement signed in 1972.

=== Later years and fall of communism ===
In February 1958, the General Military Service Act was passed, under which the duration of conscription in the Army, Air Force and Air Defense was two years, and the Navy was three. Also in 1958, the Sports Committee of Friendly Armies was established, of which the BNA became a member.

In 1974, Polina Nedyalkova (bg:Полина Недялкова) of the BNA became the first female general in the history of Bulgaria.

== Structure ==
The defence policy of the country was managed by the Ministry of People's Defense (Министерство на Народната Отбрана (МНО), headed by a professional officer such as a General of the Army or a Colonel General), under the direct supervision of the Bulgarian Communist Party, whose leader was overall commander in chief of the People's Army. The BNA was organized into the following service branches:

- Bulgarian Land Forces (Сухопътни войски (СВ), including the Missile Troops and Artillery (Ракетни Войски и Артилерия (РВА))). There were three army headquarters, amalgamated with three army districts during peacetime. They were subordinated to the Land Forces Command. In case of war the LFC was to transform into a front command and retain command of the three field armies, as well as the 10th Composite Aviation Corps and other aviation assets. The three army districts were to split from the field army commands, fall under the General Staff of the BPA and take over garrison duties in the rear areas of the armies and provide field replacement personnel for the frontline units. The peacetime tank brigades, motor rifle divisions and the separate motor rifle regiments each had a corresponding "second complement" (втори комплект) cadre). Upon mobilisation the peacetime formations were to deploy to forward positions under the field armies and their second complements were to activate under the army districts. The main peacetime combat formations of the three armies consisted of five tank brigades and eight motor rifle divisions, as reported by Lewis in 1981-82, and unchanged by the IISS in mid-1986. The IISS also reported that the Land Forces included three surface-to-surface missile brigades, four artillery regiments, three AA artillery regiments, two SAM regiments, and a parachute regiment in mid-1986.
- Air Forces and Air Defense (Военновъздушни Сили и Противовъздушна Отбрана (ВВС и ПВО))
- Military Fleet (Военноморски флот (ВМФ), the name followed the Soviet naming convention. In 1990 the name of the service changed to Navy (Военноморски сили (ВМС)))

Several other branches were directly controlled by the Ministry of People's Defense:

- Civil Defense Service (Гражданска Защита (ГЗ))
- Construction Troops (Строителни Войски (СВ), named Labor Troops (Трудови войски (ТВ)) in the 1940-46 period), directly subordinated to the Ministry of the People's Defense.

Ministry of the Interior troops included:

- Border Troops (Гранични Войски (ГВ), under the Ministry of People's Defence in the 1962-72 period)
- Interior Troops (Вътрешни войски (ВВ), under the Ministry of the Interior, disbanded in the 1960s, reestablished in the beginning of the 1980s in connection with the Revival Process and the terror attacks of the 1980s)
- People's Militia - the Socialist Era police force, the main arm of the Ministry of the Interior.

Other ministries within the government also maintained uninformed troops:

- Troops of the Post and Telecommunications Committee (Войски на Комитета по Пощи и Далекосъобщения (ВКПД)) - the government communications troops, under military discipline, outside of Ministry of the People's Defense jurisdiction. The troops were tasked with construction and maintenance of civilian communications infrastructure, not with government communications. Unrelated to the Signals Troops of the BPA. The Committee is a ministry within the government.
- Troops of the Ministry of Transportation (Войски на Министерство на Транспорта (ВМТ)) - railway construction brigades under the Ministry of Transport, under military discipline, outside of Ministry of the People's Defense jurisdiction. During wartime the TMT were also task with operating railway head lines to the FEBA. Unrelated to the transport units of the BPA.

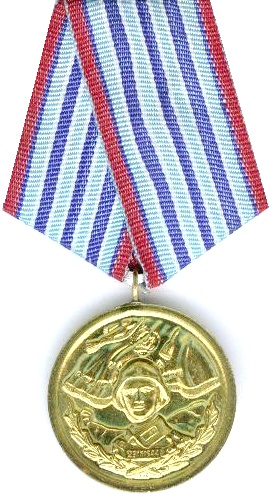
Medal for Ten Years of Service in the BNA

The BNA's manpower by the time the People's Republic was dissolved reached 120,000 men, most who were conscripts. The combined strength of the Army, Navy, Air Force, Air Defense Forces, Missile Forces, plus the strength of the People's Militia and the Border Troops reached 150,000 in 1988. The combined strength of all of the forces was 325,000 in 1989.

== Education ==
The Bulgarian People's Army education institutions existed during its activity:

- "Georgi Sava Rakovski" Military Academy (Sofia)
- "Vasil Levski" People's Higher Combined Arms School (Veliko Tarnovo)
- "Hristo Botev" Reserve Officers School (Pleven)
- "Georgi Benkovski" People's Higher Air Force School (Dolna Mitropoliya)
- "Georgi Dimitrov" People's Artillery and Air Defence Forces School (Shumen)
- "Nikola Vaptsarov" People's Higher Naval School (Varna)
- "General Blagoi Ivanov" Higher People's Military School for Construction (Sofia)

== Equipment ==
The equipment of the BNA was mostly equipment provided by the Soviet Union. Some of this equipment were 500 combat aircraft, 3,000 (mostly T-55) tanks, 2,000 armored vehicles, 2,500 artillery systems, 33 navy vessels, 67 Scud missiles, and 24 SS-23 rocket launchers.

== See also ==
- Defence Assistance Organisation
