= Dobri Dzhurov =

Bulgarian politician and military leader

Army General Dobri Dzhurov
- Добри Джуров
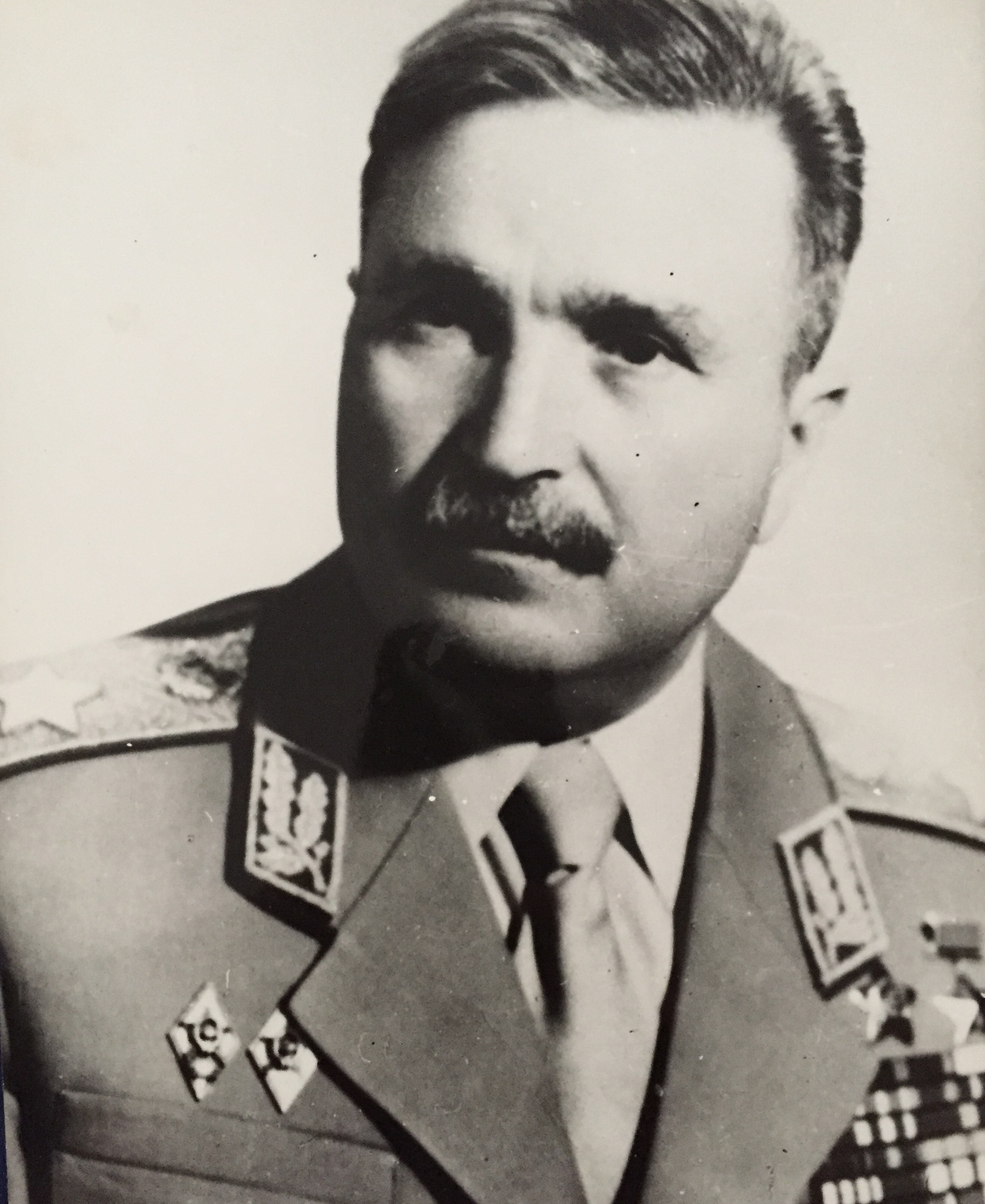

Minister of People's Defense of Bulgaria
- In office 17 March 1962 – 22 August 1990
- President: Georgi Traykov; Todor Zhivkov
- Preceded by: Ivan Mihailov
- Succeeded by: Yordan Mutafchiev

Personal details
- Born: 5 January 1916 Lovech Province, Kingdom of Bulgaria
- Died: 17 June 2002 (aged 86) Sofia, Bulgaria
- Citizenship: People's Republic of Bulgaria
- Party: Bulgarian Communist Party
- Spouse: Elena Dzhurovа

Military service
- Allegiance: People's Republic of Bulgaria
- Branch/service: Bulgarian People's Army
- Years of service: 1939–1990
- Rank: Army General

Dobri Marinov Dzhurov (Bulgarian: Добри Маринов Джуров; 5 January 1916 – 17 June 2002) was a Bulgarian politician and military leader. He was the last Defense Minister of the People's Republic of Bulgaria from 1962 to 1990.

== Biography ==
He participated in the resistance movement during the Second World War. He was the commander of a guerrilla brigade. After the communist coup in September 1944, he began work at the Ministry of the Interior and later became an officer of the Bulgarian Army. He became the Minister of People's Defense of Bulgaria in 1962. He was responsible for Bulgaria's participation in the invasion of Czechoslovakia by Warsaw Pact troops in 1968. He had been a full member of the CPB since 1974.

== Role in the downfall of Zhivkov ==
Dzhurov played a key role in the ousting of longtime Communist leader Todor Zhivkov in December 1989. Although he and Zhivkov's relationship dated back to the resistance, he had grown increasingly disgusted with Zhivkov's behavior. When he lent his support to the plot to oust Zhivkov, he was given the task of ensuring that Zhivkov would have no room to manoeuvre. On 9 November, a day before a scheduled Politburo meeting, Dzhurov advised Zhivkov to resign. He warned Zhivkov that the Politburo had lost confidence in him, and there were enough votes to remove him. Zhivkov was caught unaware and tried to marshal support, to no avail.

Just before the meeting the next day, Dzhurov gave Zhivkov an ultimatum—unless he stepped down, the Politburo would not only vote to remove him, but have him executed. Zhivkov realized he was at the end of his tether, and resigned.

== Personal life ==
He met his wife Elena in a guerrilla group. They were married for 60 years. They have three children:

- Chavdar Dzhurov, was a military pilot who in 1965 set a record of the highest night parachute jump.
- Spartak Dzhurov
- Aksiniya Dzhurova, a scientist who was named after Dzhurov older sister, who died in 1941.

Political offices
Preceded by Ivan Mihailov	Minister of People's Defence of Bulgaria; 17 March 1962 – 22 November 1990	Succeeded by Yordan Mutafchiev
