= Ministry of Defence (Bulgaria) =

Government ministry of Bulgaria

Ministry of Defence of Bulgaria
- Министерство на отбраната
- Ministerial insignia

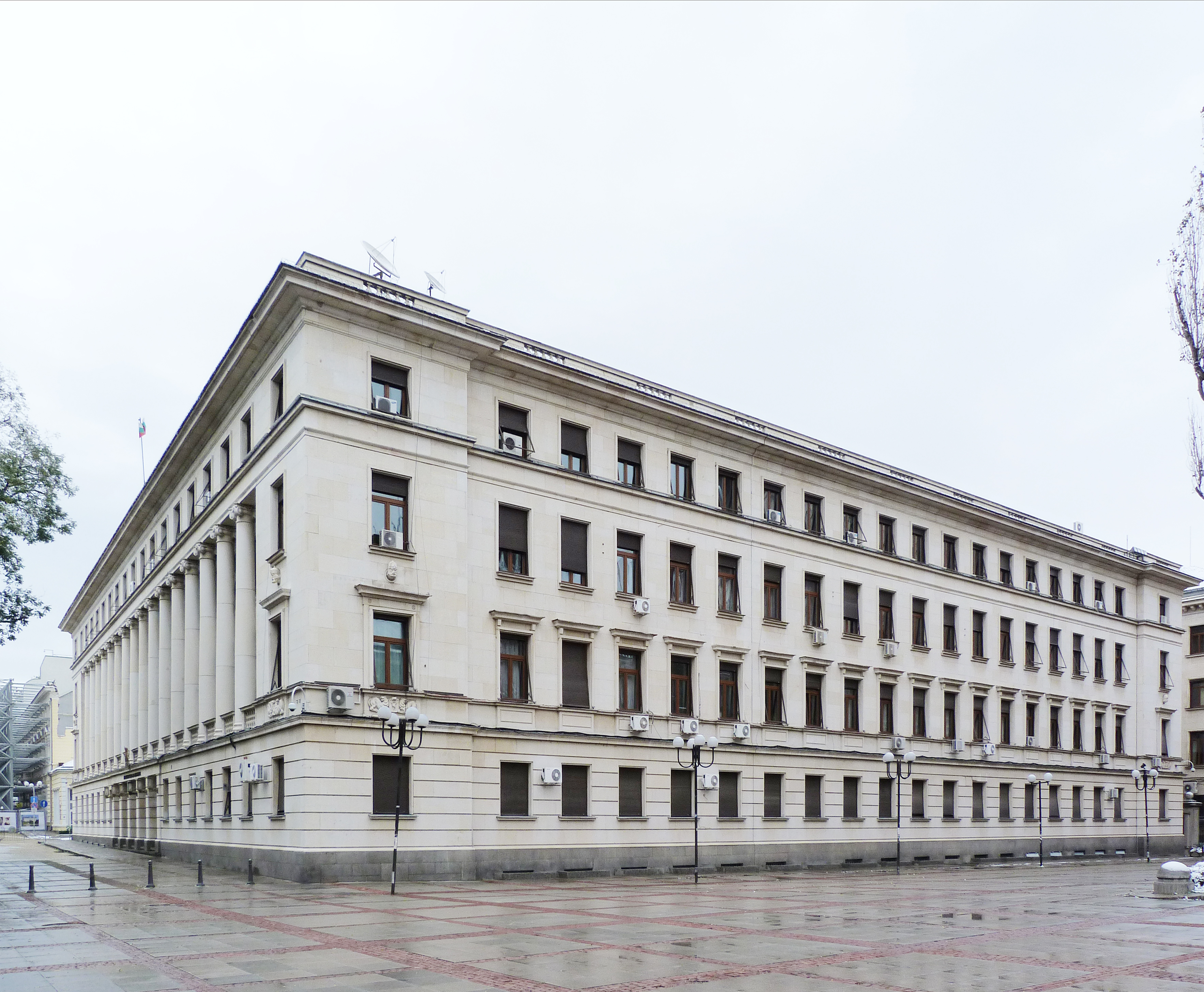
- Ministry of Defence building in Sofia

Agency overview
- Formed: 1879
- Jurisdiction: Government of Bulgaria
- Headquarters: Dyakon Ignatiy 3, Sofia
- Agency executive: Atanas Zapryanov, Minister of Defence
- Website: www.mod.bg/en

The Ministry of Defence (Bulgarian: Министерство на отбраната, Ministerstvo na otbranata) of Bulgaria is the ministry charged with regulating the Bulgarian Armed Forces. The current Minister of Defence is Atanas Zapryanov.

The present building of the ministry is among the finest examples of the Bulgarian modern architecture from the middle of 20th century. It was designed by the famous Bulgarian architectural team Vasilyov-Tsolov and completed in the period 1939–45.

== History ==
The Ministry was created in 1879. Between 1911 and 1947 it was called Ministry of War (Министерство на войната, Ministerstvo na voynata) and from 1947 to 1990 it bore the name Ministry of People's Defence (Министерство на народната отбрана, Ministerstvo na narodnata otbrana).

== Structure ==
=== Political Cabinet ===
The political cabinet assists the Minister of Defence in formulating and developing particular decisions for carrying out governmental policy, and in representing that policy to society. It consists of the deputy ministers, the head of the Minister's office, the parliamentary secretary and the Chief of the Public Relations unit. The work of the cabinet is assisted by experts. There are currently two Deputy Ministers serving office: Ivan Ivanov and Spas Panchev.

=== Secretary General ===
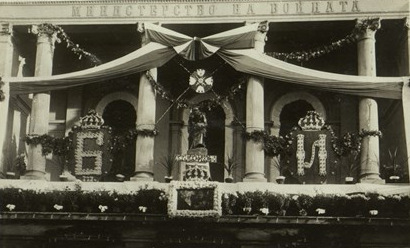
The Ministry of Defence in October 1930 - the decorations are for the wedding of Boris III with Giovanna of Savoy. The then name Министерство на войната (Ministry of War) can be seen above.

The Secretary General carries out the administrative leadership of the Ministry of Defence by implementing the legal orders issued by the Minister of Defence; it also leads, coordinates, and controls the functioning of the Ministry of Defence with respect to the strict observation of the laws and the sub-law acts, and reports to the Minister of Defence on the activities of the Ministry of Defence; The Secretary General:

- leads, coordinates and controls the circulation of documentation;
- manages the accountability and the control over the preparation of orders and guidance of the Minister of Defence;
- guides the process on the automation of the management of the Ministry of Defence;
- organizes and is responsible for the keeping and managing of the real estate and portable items provided to and used by the Ministry of Defence.
- approves the expenditures necessary for managing the Ministry of Defence;
- develops the draft of the budget of the Ministry of Defence in its part related to the means necessary for the administrative support of the activities of the Ministry of Defence;
- keeps track of legal and appropriate spending of the financial means and materiel provided for the Ministry of Defence;
- prepares an annual report on the status of the administrative activities in the Ministry of Defence, which he presents to the Minister of the State's Administration after the report is approved by the Minister of Defence.

The Minister of Defence's job within the Secretary General is that:

- he is responsible for the checking regime and security in the building of the Ministry of Defence;
- he fulfils other tasks as well which are assigned to him by the Minister of Defence

=== Inspectorate ===
The Inspectorate to the Ministry of Defence provides the act of fulfilling the control functions on the part of the Minister of Defence in carrying out the state policy in the sphere of defence. The Inspectorate examines and investigates with respect to:

- observation of the laws and of the orders issued by the Minister of Defence;
- observation of the order and discipline in the troops;
- management and assigning of financial means and materiel;
- personnel management;
- preservation of the natural environment;
- other checks assigned to the inspectorate by the Minister of Defence.

The Inspectorate is directly subordinate to the Minister of Defence and is headed by the Chief Inspector. Additionally, it studies the suggestions, signals, litigations and requests filed by physical persons or legal entities to the Minister of Defence and prepares answers to the above-mentioned. The organization of the activities of the inspectorate, the types of the checks as well as the conditions and the order of how to conduct them, are determined by the Minister of Defence.

=== General Administration ===
The general Administration of the Ministry of Defence is organized into directorates "Administrative and Financial Service" and "Financial-Economic Activities".

=== Specialized Administration ===
The specialized administration of the Ministry of Defence is organized into eleven directorates. The specialized administration assists and provides for the realization of the rights of the Minister of Defence and of the deputy ministers of defence within the framework of the rights delegated to them and the functions they are assigned.

Directorates:

- Defence policy directorate
- Defence planning and programming directorate
- International cooperation directorate
- Budget planning and management directorate
- Personnel policy directorate
- Financial control activities directorate
- Procurement management directorate
- Military infrastructure directorate
- Armaments and equipment policy directorate
- Legal and regulatory affairs (LRA) directorate
- Military Standardization, Quality and Codification Directorate

=== Officer on Security of Information ===
The officer on the security of information is directly subordinate to the Minister of Defence and fulfils tasks which are assigned to him by virtue of the Law on the protection of classified information and by the sub-law acts on the enforcement of the above-mentioned law. In carrying out his functions, the officer on the security of information is assisted by a unit working on the security of the information.

== Administrative Structures subordinated to the Ministry of Defence ==
=== Military information service ===
This functions as a service which:

- is a legal entity supported by the budget - it is a secondary budget credit holder to the Minister of Defence; and
- acquires, processes, analyzes, keeps and provides information in the interest of defence and the national security of the Republic of Bulgaria.

This organizational structure of the service is approved by the Minister of Defence and its activities are defined by Regulations approved by the council of ministers.

=== Security - military police and military counterintelligence service ===
Its functions are as follows The basic tasks of "Security - military police and military counterintelligence" service is to maintain the order and security in the Ministry of Defence and in the Bulgarian army. Parallel to that it fulfils the following functions:

- it provides for the protection of the Ministry of Defence and the Bulgarian army from activities of foreign special services, organizations and persons directed against the security of the Ministry of Defence and the Bulgarian army;
- carries out activities aimed at maintaining order in the Ministry of Defence and in the Bulgarian army for the prevention, revealing and investigation of crimes committed in the Ministry of Defence and in the Bulgarian army with a view to finding out the perpetrators;
- pr
- provides for the controforover the observation of the rules for movement on the rceds by the drivers of transport vehicles and organized groups of servicemen;
- conducts activities pertaining to collecting, processing, storage, analyzing, using and providing information related to the maintenance of order and security in the Ministry of Defence and in the Bulgarian army.

The structure of the "Security - military police and military counterintelligence" service is built on a territorial principle in accordance with the administrative-territorial division of the Republic of Bulgaria and with the existing organizational and positional structure of the Bulgarian army.

== List of ministers ==
No.	Name (Birth–Death)	Portrait	Took office	Left office	Political party
Ministers of Army (1879–1912)
1	Pyotr Parensov (1843–1914)		17 July 1879	3 April 1880	Imperial Russian Army
2	Paul von Plehwe (1850–1916)		3 April 1880	15 April 1880	Imperial Russian Army
3	Alexander Timler (1835–1896)		15 April 1880	17 April 1880	Imperial Russian Army
4	Johan Casimir Ehrnrooth (1833–1913)		17 April 1880	13 July 1881	Imperial Russian Army
5	Vladimir Krylov (1830–1888)		13 July 1881	24 April 1882	Imperial Russian Army
6	Ivan Lesovoy (1835–1918)		24 April 1882	3 July 1882	Imperial Russian Army
7	Alexander Kaulbars (1844–1925)		3 July 1882	19 September 1883	Imperial Russian Army
8	Aleksandr Roediger (1853–1920)		19 September 1883	26 October 1883	Imperial Russian Army
9	Viktor Kotelnikov (?–?)		26 October 1883	10 February 1884	Imperial Russian Army
10	Mikhail Cantacuzène (1840–1891)		10 February 1884	7 March 1885	Imperial Russian Army
11	Ivan Weymarn (1840–1891)		7 March 1885	22 April 1885	Imperial Russian Army
(10)	Mikhail Cantacuzène (1840–1891) (2nd time)		22 April 1885	22 September 1885	Imperial Russian Army
12	Konstantin Nikiforov (1856–1891)		22 September 1885	24 August 1886	Bulgarian Army
13	Olimpiy Panov (1852–1887)		24 August 1886	28 August 1886	Bulgarian Army
14	Danail Nikolaev (1852–1942)		28 August 1886	10 July 1887	Bulgarian Army
15	Racho Petrov (1861–1942)		10 July 1887	1 September 1887	Bulgarian Army
16	Sava Mutkurov (1852–1891)		1 September 1887	16 February 1891	Bulgarian Army
17	Mihail Savov (1857–1928)		16 February 1891	27 April 1894	Bulgarian Army
(15)	Racho Petrov (1861–1942) (2nd time)		27 April 1894	29 November 1896	Bulgarian Army
18	Nikola Ivanov (1861–1940)		29 November 1896	30 January 1899	Bulgarian Army
19	Stefan Paprikov (1858–1920)		30 January 1899	31 March 1903	Bulgarian Army
(17)	Mihail Savov (1857–1928) (2nd time)		31 March 1903	4 May 1907	Bulgarian Army
(14)	Danail Nikolaev (1852–1942) (2nd time)		4 May 1907	29 March 1911	Bulgarian Army
20	Nikifor Nikiforov (1858–1935)		29 March 1911	14 January 1912	Bulgarian Army
Ministers of War (1912–1947)
20	Nikifor Nikiforov (1858–1935)		14 January 1912	14 June 1913	Bulgarian Army
21	Stiliyan Kovachev (1860–1939)		14 June 1913	11 July 1913	Bulgarian Army
22	Georgi Vazov (1860–1934)		11 July 1913	4 September 1913	Bulgarian Army
23	Kliment Boyadzhiev (1861–1933)		4 September 1913	14 September 1914	Bulgarian Army
24	Ivan Fichev (1860–1931)		14 September 1914	19 August 1915	Bulgarian Army
25	Nikola Zhekov (1864–1949)		19 August 1915	4 October 1915	Bulgarian Army
26	Kalin Naydenov (1865–1925)		4 October 1915	21 June 1918	Bulgarian Army
27	Sava Savov (1865–1945)		21 June 1918	28 November 1918	Bulgarian Army
28	Andrey Lyapchev (1866–1933)		28 November 1918	7 May 1919	Democratic Party
29	Mihail Madzharov (1854–1944)		7 May 1919	6 October 1919	People's Party
30	Aleksandar Stamboliyski (1879–1923)		6 October 1919	24 June 1921	Bulgarian Agrarian National Union
31	Aleksandar Dimitrov (1878–1921)		24 June 1921	22 October 1921	Bulgarian Agrarian National Union
(30)	Aleksandar Stamboliyski (1879–1923) (2nd time)		22 October 1921	9 November 1921	Bulgarian Agrarian National Union
32	Konstantin Tomov (1888–1935)		9 November 1921	9 February 1923	Bulgarian Agrarian National Union
(30)	Aleksandar Stamboliyski (1879–1923) (3rd time)		9 February 1923	12 March 1923	Bulgarian Agrarian National Union
33	Konstantin Muraviev (1893–1965)		9 February 1923	9 June 1923	Bulgarian Agrarian National Union
34	Aleksandar Tsankov (1879–1959)		9 June 1923	10 June 1923	Democratic Alliance
35	Ivan Valkov (1875–1962)		10 June 1923	11 January 1929	Bulgarian Army
36	Nikola Bakardzhiev (1881–1954)		11 January 1929	31 January 1931	Bulgarian Army
37	Aleksandar Kisyov (1879–1964)		31 January 1931	9 May 1934	Bulgarian Army
38	Anastas Vatev (1881–1967)		9 May 1934	19 May 1934	Bulgarian Army
39	Pencho Zlatev (1881–1948)		19 May 1934	21 April 1935	Bulgarian Army
40	Stefan Tsanev (1881–1944)		21 April 1935	23 November 1935	Bulgarian Army
41	Hristo Lukov (1888–1943)		23 November 1935	24 January 1938	Bulgarian Army
42	Teodosi Daskalov (1888–1945)		24 January 1938	11 April 1942	Bulgarian Army
43	Nikola Mihov (1891–1945)		11 April 1942	14 September 1943	Bulgarian Army
44	Rusi Rusev (1887–1945)		14 September 1943	2 September 1944	Bulgarian Army
45	Ivan Marinov (1896–1979)		2 September 1944	9 September 1944	Bulgarian Army
46	Damyan Velchev (1883–1954)		9 September 1944	25 September 1946	Zveno
47	Kimon Georgiev (1882–1969)		25 September 1946	22 November 1946	Zveno
48	Georgi Damyanov (1892–1958)		22 November 1946	11 December 1947	Bulgarian Communist Party
Ministers of People's Defence (1947–1990)
48	Georgi Damyanov (1892–1958)		11 December 1947	27 May 1950	Bulgarian Communist Party
49	Petar Panchevski (1902–1982)		27 May 1950	9 June 1958	Bulgarian Communist Party
50	Ivan Mihailov (1897–1982)		9 June 1958	17 March 1962	Bulgarian Communist Party
51	Dobri Dzhurov (1916–2002)		17 March 1962	22 November 1990	Bulgarian Communist Party
52	Yordan Mutafchiev (1940–2015)		22 November 1990	20 December 1990	Bulgarian Socialist Party
Ministers of Defence (1990–present)
52	Yordan Mutafchiev (1940–2015)		20 December 1990	8 November 1991	Bulgarian Socialist Party
53	Dimitar Ludzhev (born 1950)		8 November 1991	20 May 1992	Union of Democratic Forces
54	Aleksandar Staliyski (1925–2004)		20 May 1992	30 December 1992	Democratic Party
55	Valentin Aleksandrov (1946–2008)		30 December 1992	17 October 1994	Independent
56	Boyko Noev (born 1964)		17 October 1994	26 January 1995	Independent
57	Dimitar Pavlov (1937–2019)		26 January 1995	12 February 1997	Bulgarian Socialist Party
58	Georgi Ananiev (1950–2021)		12 February 1997	21 December 1999	Union of Democratic Forces
(56)	Boyko Noev (born 1964) (2nd time)		21 December 1999	24 July 2001	Union of Democratic Forces
59	Nikolay Svinarov (born 1958)		24 July 2001	17 August 2005	National Movement Simeon II
60	Veselin Bliznakov (born 1944)		17 August 2005	24 April 2008	National Movement Simeon II
61	Nikolai Tsonev (born 1956)		24 April 2008	27 July 2009	National Movement for Stability and Progress
62	Nickolay Mladenov (born 1972)		27 July 2009	27 January 2010	GERB
63	Anyu Angelov (born 1942)		27 January 2010	13 March 2013	GERB
64	Todor Tagarev (born 1960)		13 March 2013	29 May 2013	Independent
65	Angel Naydenov (born 1958)		29 May 2013	6 August 2014	Bulgarian Socialist Party
66	Velizar Shalamanov (born 1961)		6 August 2014	7 November 2014	Independent
67	Nikolay Nenchev (born 1966)		7 November 2014	27 January 2017	Reformist Bloc
68	Stefan Yanev (born 1960)		27 January 2017	4 May 2017	Independent
69	Krasimir Karakachanov (born 1965)		4 May 2017	12 May 2021	United Patriots
70	Georgi Panayotov (born 1968)		12 May 2021	13 December 2021	Independent
(68)	Stefan Yanev (born 1960)		13 December 2021	1 March 2022	Independent
71	Dragomir Zakov (born 1975)		1 March 2022	2 August 2022	Independent
72	Dimitar Stoyanov (born 1968)		2 August 2022	6 June 2023	Independent
(64)	Todor Tagarev (born 1960)		6 June 2023	9 April 2024	Independent
73	Atanas Zapryanov (born 1950)		9 April 2024	8 May 2026	Independent
(72)	Dimitar Stoyanov (born 1968)		8 May 2026	Incumbent	Progressive Bulgaria
