= United States Air Forces in Europe Band =

American military band

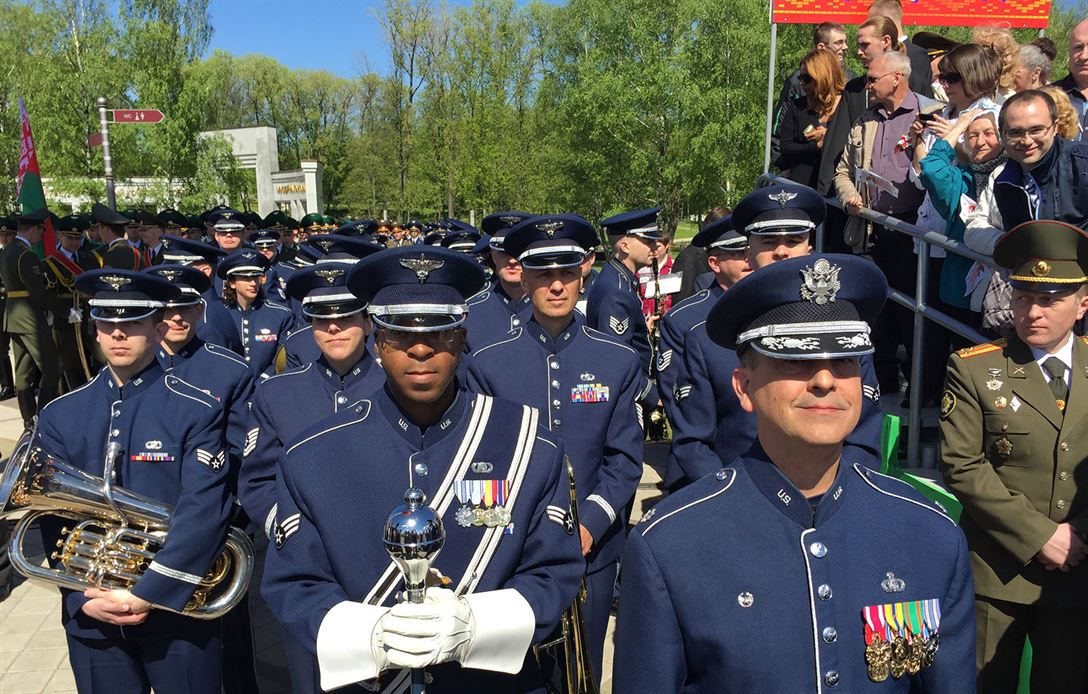
The USAFE Band

The 686th Air Force Band, known also as the United States Air Forces in Europe Band (USAFE Band) is composed of 45 active duty Air Force musicians who serve under the United States Air Forces in Europe - Air Forces Africa Command and work as musical ambassadors to European nations in NATO and the European Union. Through numerous radio and television broadcasts, and performances, the USAFE Band provides American music to the troops of USAFE.

== History ==
It was first activated on 1 February 1943, as the 386th Army Band of the United States Army Air Forces, the predecessor of the USAF. Starting as a unit of just five members, the band quickly grew to an ensemble of 45. The unit's primary mission was to develop a way to entertain U.S. troops and boost their morale on the frontlines. In addition to performing traditional military ceremonial and parade music, members formed a dance band which performed for evening events on Post, playing the popular swing music of the era, as composed by the Army Air Corps' own Major Glenn Miller, among others. In 1944, amidst some of the fiercest battles of World War II, The band was selected for relocation to Europe; first, briefly, in a suburb of Paris, France, and then in Wiesbaden Germany, where they remained stationed until 1977. Since then, the band has moved among various locations in Germany, ultimately settling at their current home of Ramstein Air Base.

== Functions ==
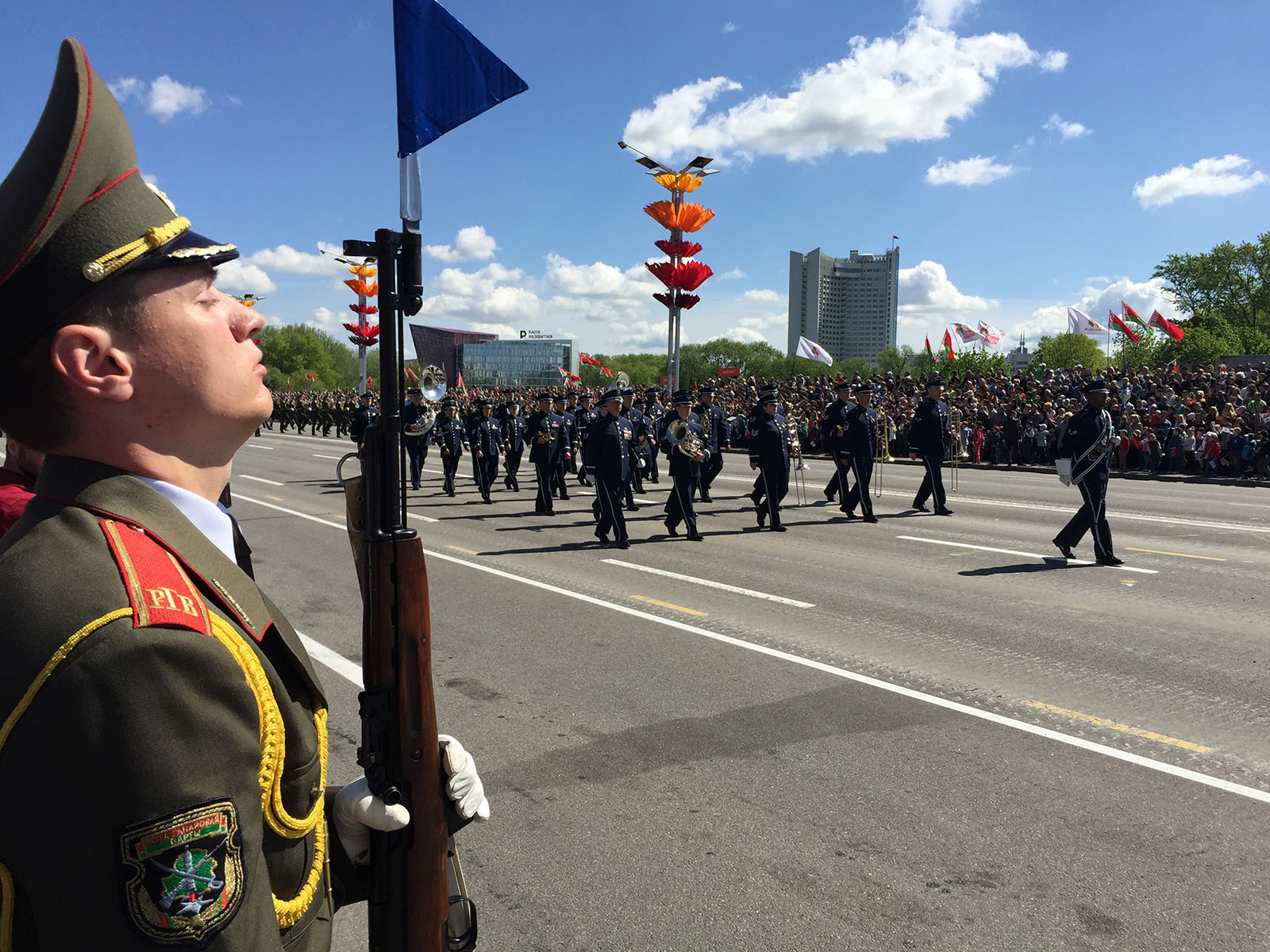
The USAFE Band during a parade in Minsk, Belarus, in May 2015.

The functions of the band rests in the band's different ensembles. The USAFE Ceremonial Band is mainly provides full musical honors, such as Ruffles and Flourishes. Their presence is centered around traditional military ceremonies such as state visits and funerals. It also takes part in military tattoos and marching festivals all over the continent, earning it the nickname of "America's Musical Ambassador". "The Ambassadors" ensemble is a jazz band with characteristics of big band ensembles. The "Touch & Go" ensemble is a dynamic pop/rock band that covers music of today as well as music of the 70's, 80's and 90's.

== Leadership ==
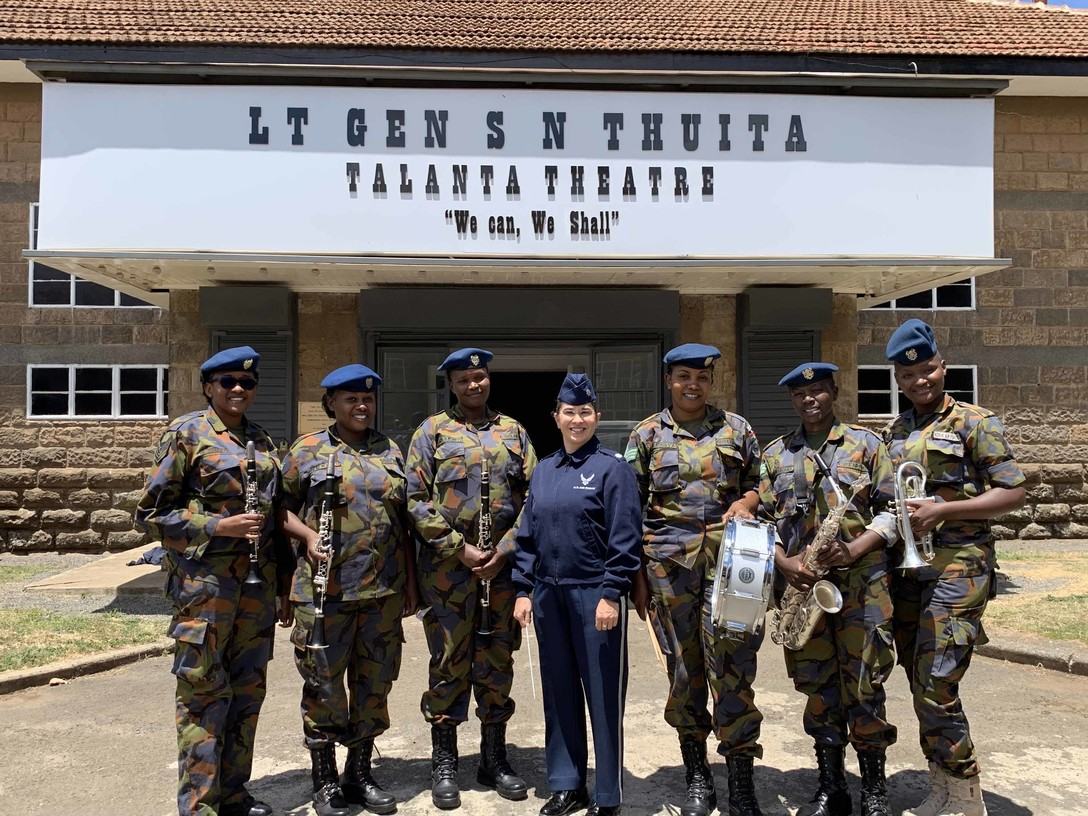
Six female members of the Kenya Air Force Band with Lieutenant Colonel Cristina Moore Urrutia in 2019.

- Band Commander: Lt Col Rafael F. Toro-Quiñones
- Flight Commander : Captain Brian O'Donnell
- Senior Enlisted Leader : Chief Master Sergeant Vladimir Tchekan
- Superintendent : Senior Master Sergeant Benjamin Kadow
- First Sergeant: Technical Sergeant Elizabeth Barnette
- Director of Operations: Technical Sergeant Jared M. Andrews

== Structure ==
- Ceremonial Band
- The Ambassadors
- Concert Band
- Touch & Go
- Winds Aloft
- Five Star Brass
- Wings of Dixie
- Clarinet Quartet

== See also ==
- List of United States Air Force bands
- United States Air Force Band
- United States Air Force Academy Band
- United States Air Forces in Europe - Air Forces Africa
- United States Army Europe Band and Chorus
- United States Naval Forces Europe Band
