= United States Naval Forces Europe Band =

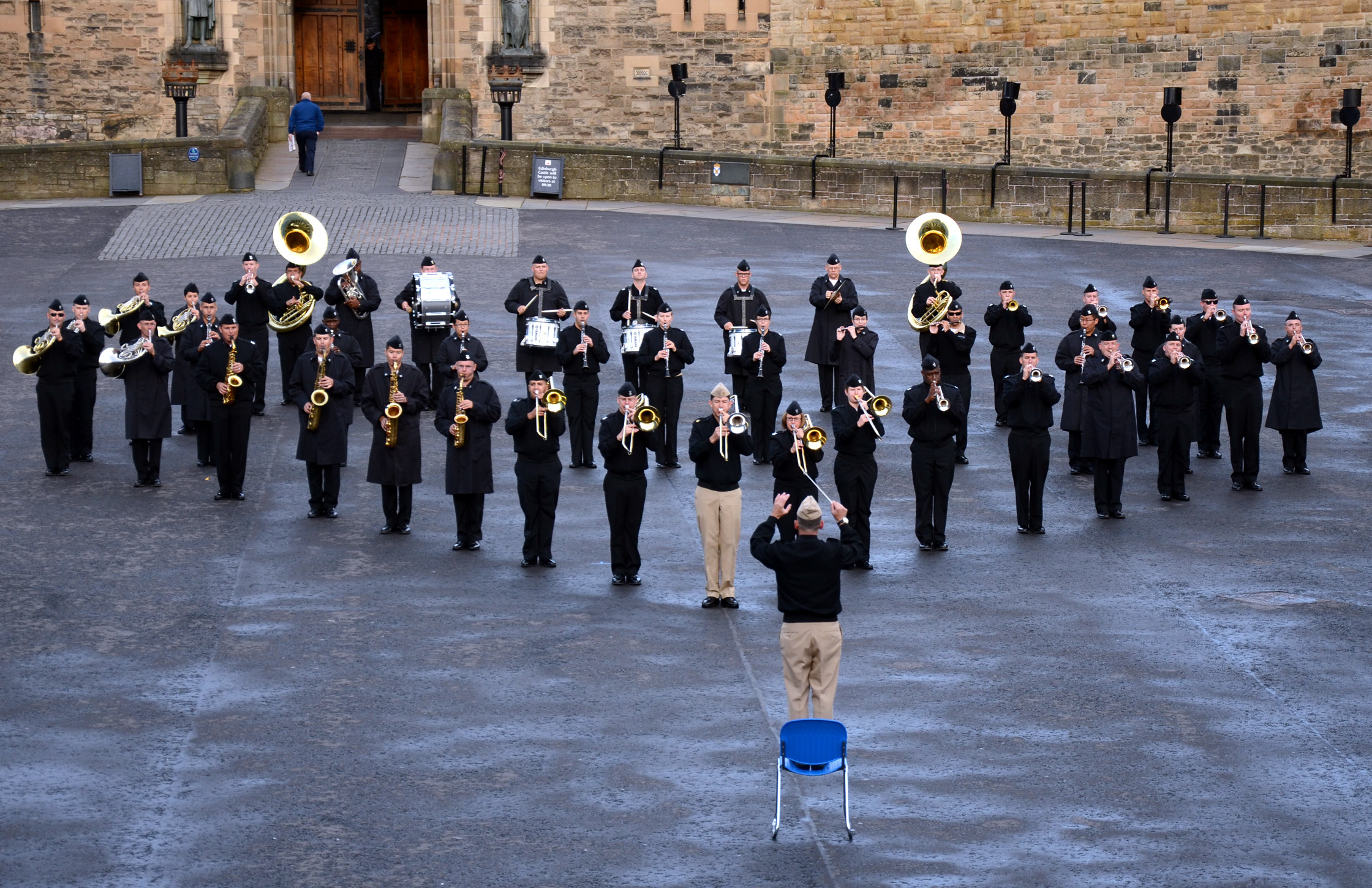
The NAVEUR Band rehearsing prior to participating in the Royal Edinburgh Military Tattoo

The United States Naval Forces Europe Band (NAVEUR Band) is the musical component of the United States Naval Forces Europe - Naval Forces Africa, a subordinate command of the United States European Command and United States Africa Command. It acts as the de facto American musical unit for Europe. As a United States Navy band, it is part of the Navy Music Program. Currently stationed in at Naval Support Activity in Naples, Italy, it operates under the direct control and supervision of the Commander of NAVEUR.

== History ==
Naval music has had a long history in North America as well as Europe that dates back to the 1950s. The current NAVEUR Band traces back to two separate naval bands in the continent, the Allied Forces Southern Europe Band (CINCSOUTH Band) and the Sixth Fleet Band, both operating from Naples, Italy.

=== CINCSOUTH Band ===
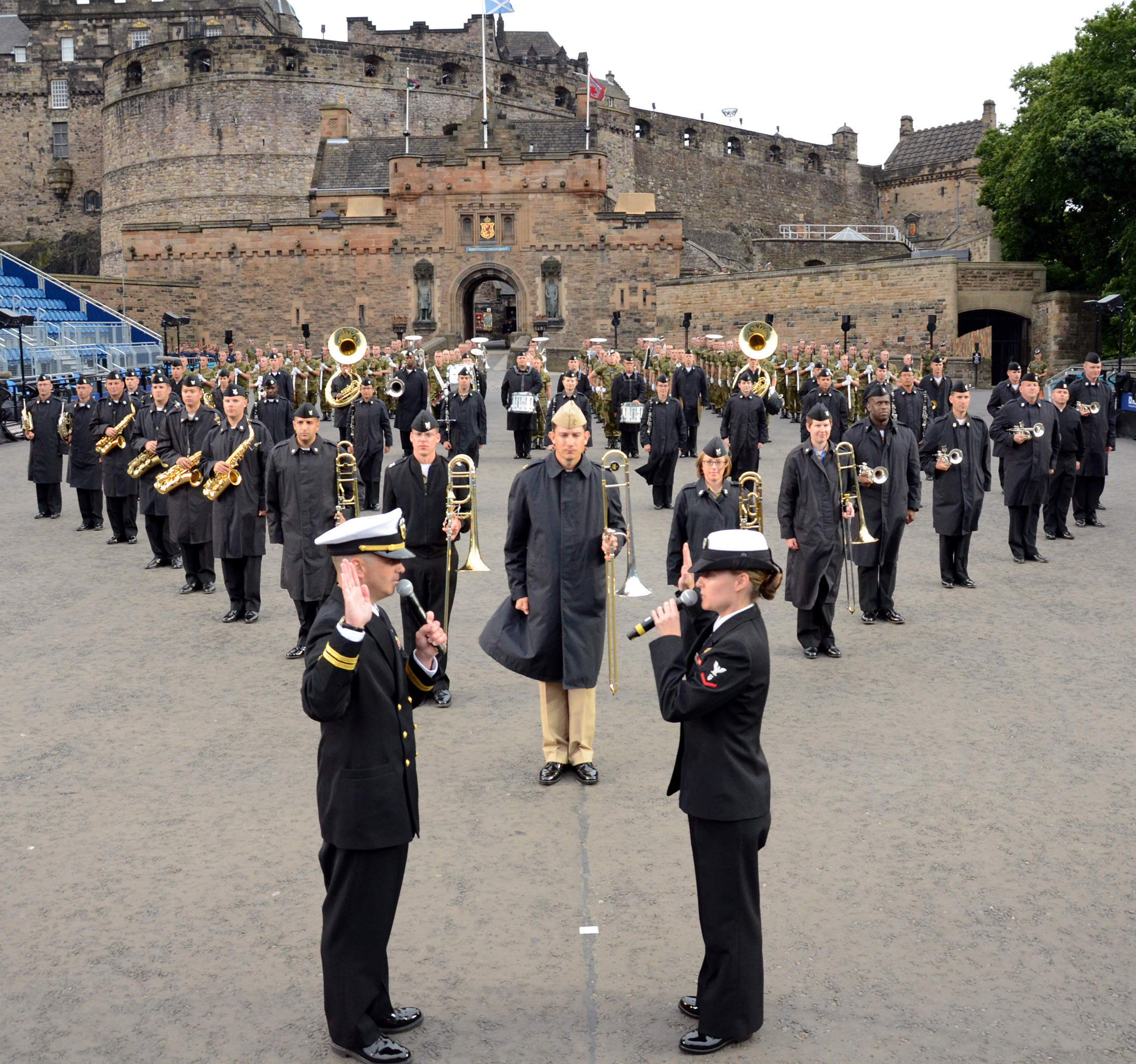
An oath of re-enlistment ceremony to Musician 3rd Class Margaret Pedlow after the band rehearsed their segment of the Royal Edinburgh Military Tattoo in July 2012.

The CINCSOUTH Band was formed in the 1950s in London from a small contingent of naval musicians who served under the command of Naval Forces Eastern Atlantic. Later in the decade, the band was relocated to Italy and permanently stationed there. In 1974, the CINCSOUTH Band was expanded to included military musicians from countries such as Greece and Turkey to better reflect the diversity of NATO. In 1997 and 2002 respectively, it was expanded further to include musicians from the United States Marine Corps and the Corps of Royal Marines. In 2004, the band was redesignated as the Allied Forces Band Naples.

=== Sixth Fleet Band ===
Until 1958, the newly established Sixth Fleet never maintained a unit band and constantly carried various naval bands from the U.S. In the Spring of that year, the USS Des Moines established a unit band which would be based at Villefranche-sur-Mer, France. Following the withdrawal of France from the military command of NATO in 1967, the band changed its permanent base to Gaeta in central Italy. The band continued to serve on board ships of the Sixth Fleet until the early 1970s, when it moved San Pietro a Patierno, a suburb of Naples.

=== Merger ===
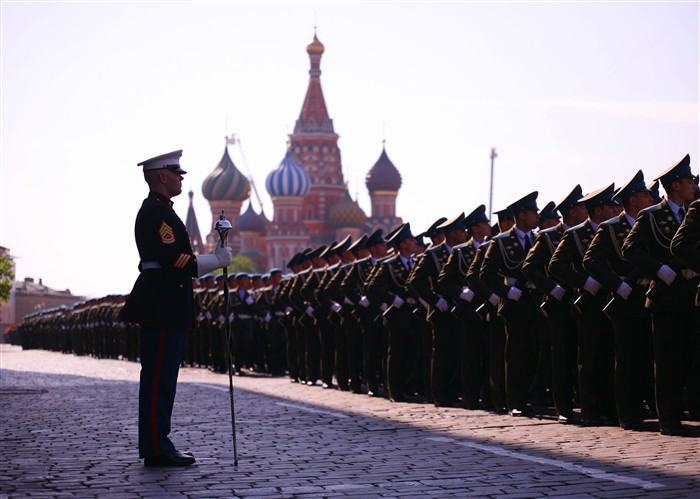
Marine Corps Gunnery Sergeant. Benjamin Becker, Drum Major for NAVEUR Band, stands in Red Square while waiting to perform during the 2010 Moscow Victory Day Parade.

In 2004, the Sixth Fleet was merged into the staff of Commander of NAVEUR, effectively making the two bands operate under the same command structure. In May 2006, Admiral Henry G. Ulrich III, requested that the two bands are combined to create a singular band that would represent the entire naval command. The request was approved the following month with a layout of the size, mission and jurisdiction being established. As a result of a restructuring of Fleet Band Activities (FBA) in 2012, the NAVEUR was reduced to 52 members (50 enlisted musicians and two officers).

=== Notable performances ===
- 1972 – Cultural Olympics in Munich, Germany
- 2009 – Bulgarian Armed Forces Day in Sofia, Bulgaria
- 2010 – Moscow Victory Day Parade commemorating the 65th anniversary of the German surrender in World War II
- 2016 – Utah Beach Memorial Ceremony
- 2017 – Royal Edinburgh Military Tattoo
- 2018 – Funeral service for sailor Julius Pieper at the Normandy American Cemetery
- 2019 – Magdeburg Musikparade

== Mission ==
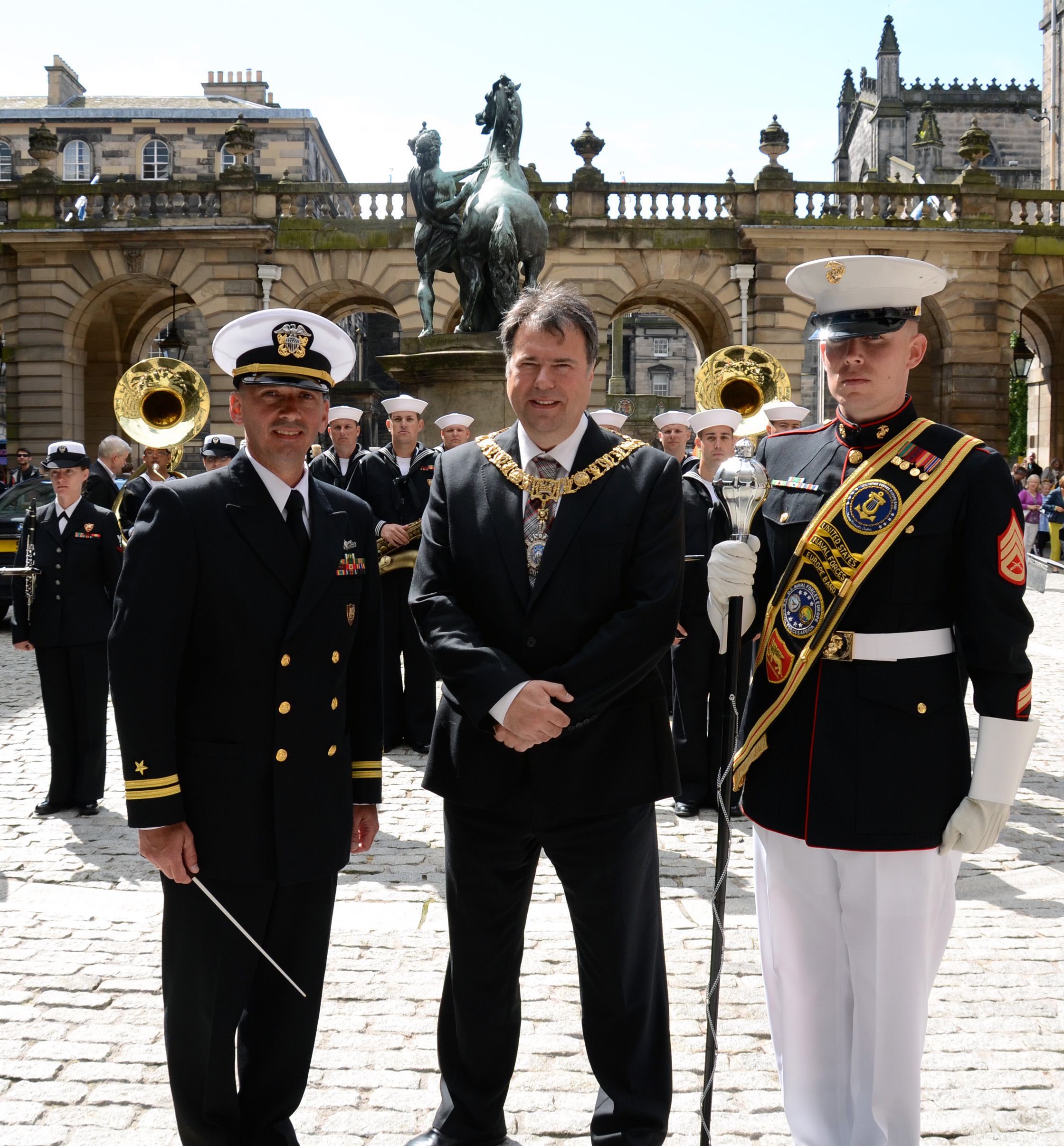
Lieutenant David Latour, the NAVEUR Band director with David Wilson, the Lord Provost of Edinburgh.

The 50 members of the NAVEUR Band serve the mission of supporting NAVEUR and the personnel of the Sixth Fleet at official military ceremonies such as ship arrivals and departures, change of command ceremonies, and official receptions. It also serves to enhance the esprit de corps of all United States Naval personnel and naval personnel of allied countries on the European mainland. Like the bands of the other European commands in the Army and Air Force, the NAVEUR Band is involved in improving United States–European Union relations, often acting as a symbolic ambassador for the United States. The repertoire of the band is very diverse, having been known to cover all types of music. Other than the significant protocol music that the band performs (ruffles and flourishes, Hands Across the Sea, Admirals March and Anchors Aweigh being common pieces), the band also has been known to perform to American and European classical music, as well as jazz from the two regions. country rock and swing music are also notable examples of the band's musical diversity. In its travels, the band has performed throughout the continent, stopping in countries such as Iceland, Croatia, Spain, Bulgaria and the United Kingdom. It also travels outside Europe and performs in African countries such as Djibouti and South Africa. In all, the band reaches a combined audience of more than 60 million people spanning the two continents.

== Composition ==
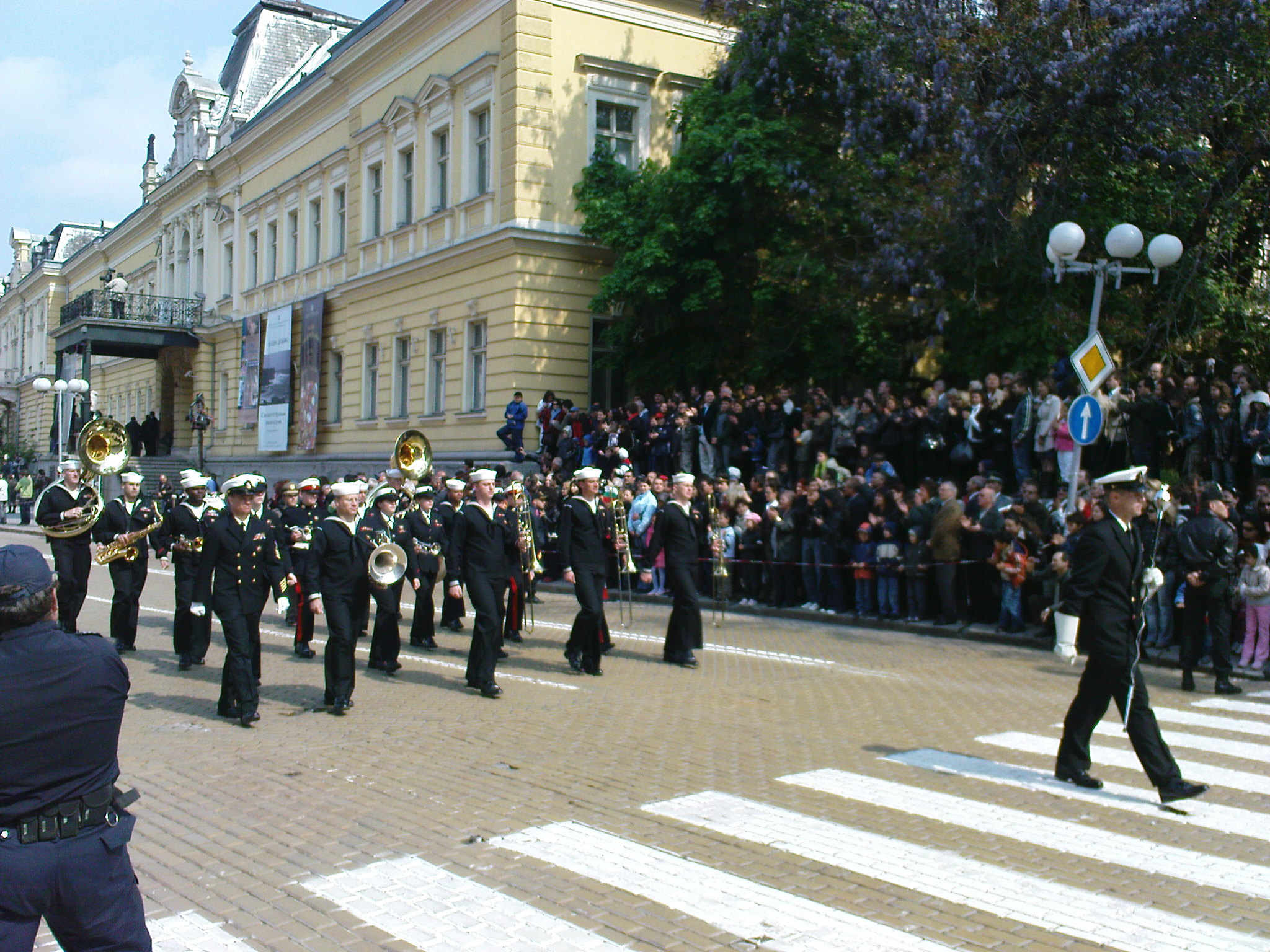
The band during the Bulgarian Armed Forces Day Parade in Sofia, May 2009.

Uniquely, the NAVEUR Band is composed of both active duty Navy and United States Marine Corps (USMC) musicians, alongside by foreign musicians from the European countries such as the United Kingdom and Italian services such as the Carabinieri to make the band serve also as a musical support unit for all events involving the North Atlantic Treaty Organization (NATO). These musicians are divided into different performing units, each of which serve to fulfill a specific ceremony at any request.

The following is a list of ensembles in the NAVEUR Band:

- Wind Ensemble (50 musicians)
- Ceremonial Band (18–50 musicians)
- Marching Band (22–50 musicians)
- Brass Quintet (5 musicians)
- Woodwind Quintet (5 musicians)
- Big Band (6–8 musicians)
- Jazz Ensemble (18–22 musicians)
- Pop Music Ensemble (18–22 musicians)
- Rock Band (7 musicians)
- Protocol Combo (3–6 musicians)

The band also maintains the following solo roles:

- Bugler
- Vocalist
- Pianist

The marching band and the ceremonial band are the flagship units of the NAVEUR Band, supporting military ceremonies by leading the formation in parades and rendering honors (the former is done by the marching band).

== See also ==
- United States military bands
- United States Air Forces in Europe Band
- United States Army Europe Band and Chorus
- U.S. Armed Forces School of Music
- U.S. Navy Steel Band
- United States Naval Academy Band
