= United States Army Europe Band and Chorus =

American military band

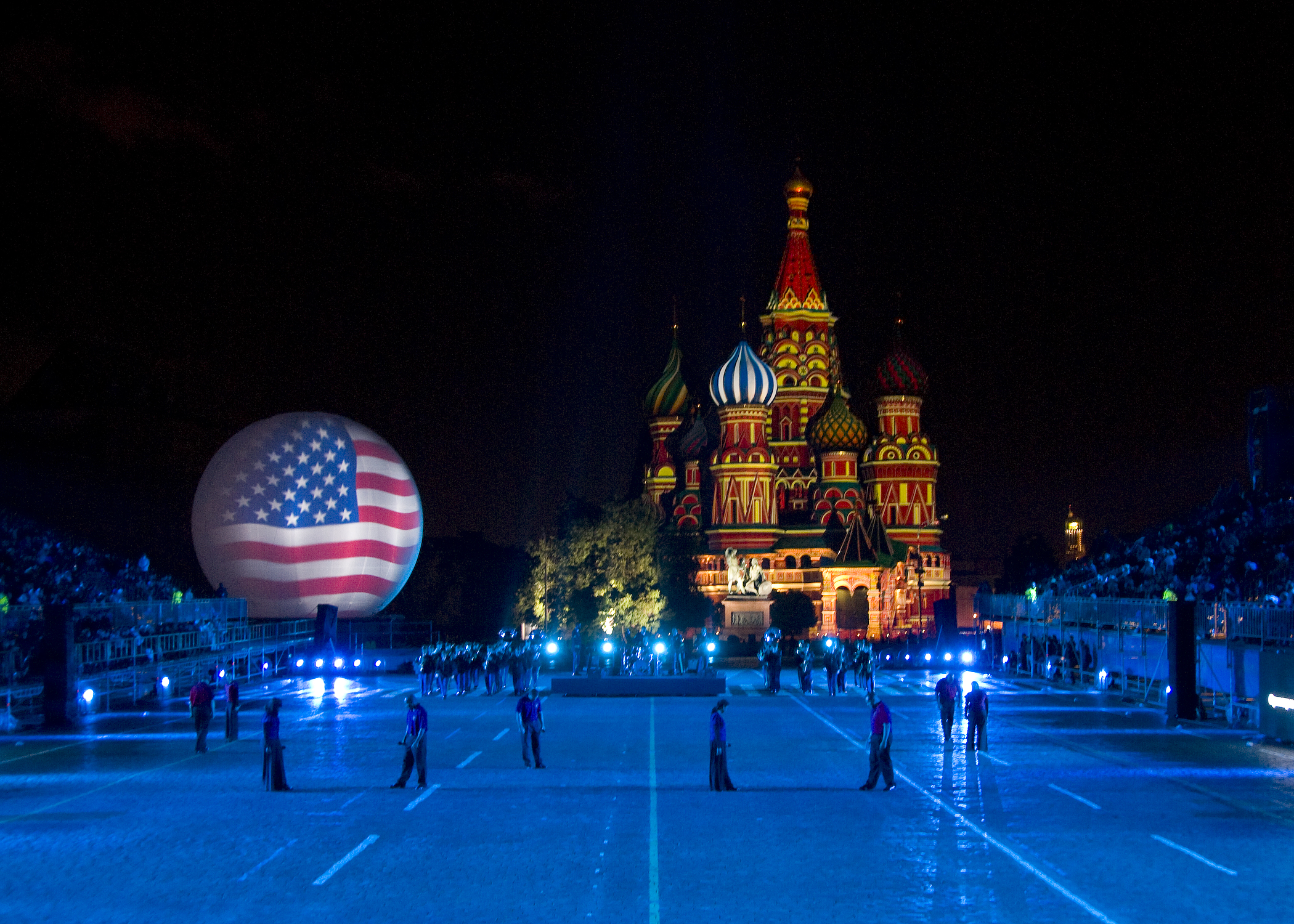
The United States Army Europe Band and Chorus performing in the 2010 Spasskaya Tower Military Music Festival and Tattoo.

The United States Army Europe Band and Chorus is a musical component of the United States Army, composed of army musicians who serve under the USAREUR-AF. It is currently based in the German city of Sembach, being subordinated to the Headquarters Battalion, USAREUR, in Wiesbaden. Its components include a 100+ concert and ceremonial ensemble. It is currently under the musical command of Colonel James S. McKenzie. The band members enter the band as musicians while singers are selectively chosen through Army auditions. The combined band and chorus perform in 200+ events per year all over the European continent.

== Brief history ==
The USAREUR Band dates back to December 1940, when the unit was first constituted on the 16th of that month. It was raised as the 367th Infantry Band. It was officially activated on March 25, 1941 in Louisiana and was re-designated in June of the next year as the 364th Infantry Band. It was reorganized again twice in the following three years, lastly as the 448th Army Band which was deactivated in early 1947. The band was re-established on June 25, 1949 in Mannheim, Germany as the 33rd Army Band under the command of USAREUR. It moved to the headquarters of USAREUR (Wiesbaden) in 1952, where it was given its current name. Its original purpose was to support USAREUR and represent the United States Army in the North Atlantic Treaty Organization (NATO). On 27 October 1981, the band and Soldiers' Chorus were combined under the direction US Army Europe Public Affairs Office and have since performed together as a single unit.

== Notable performances ==
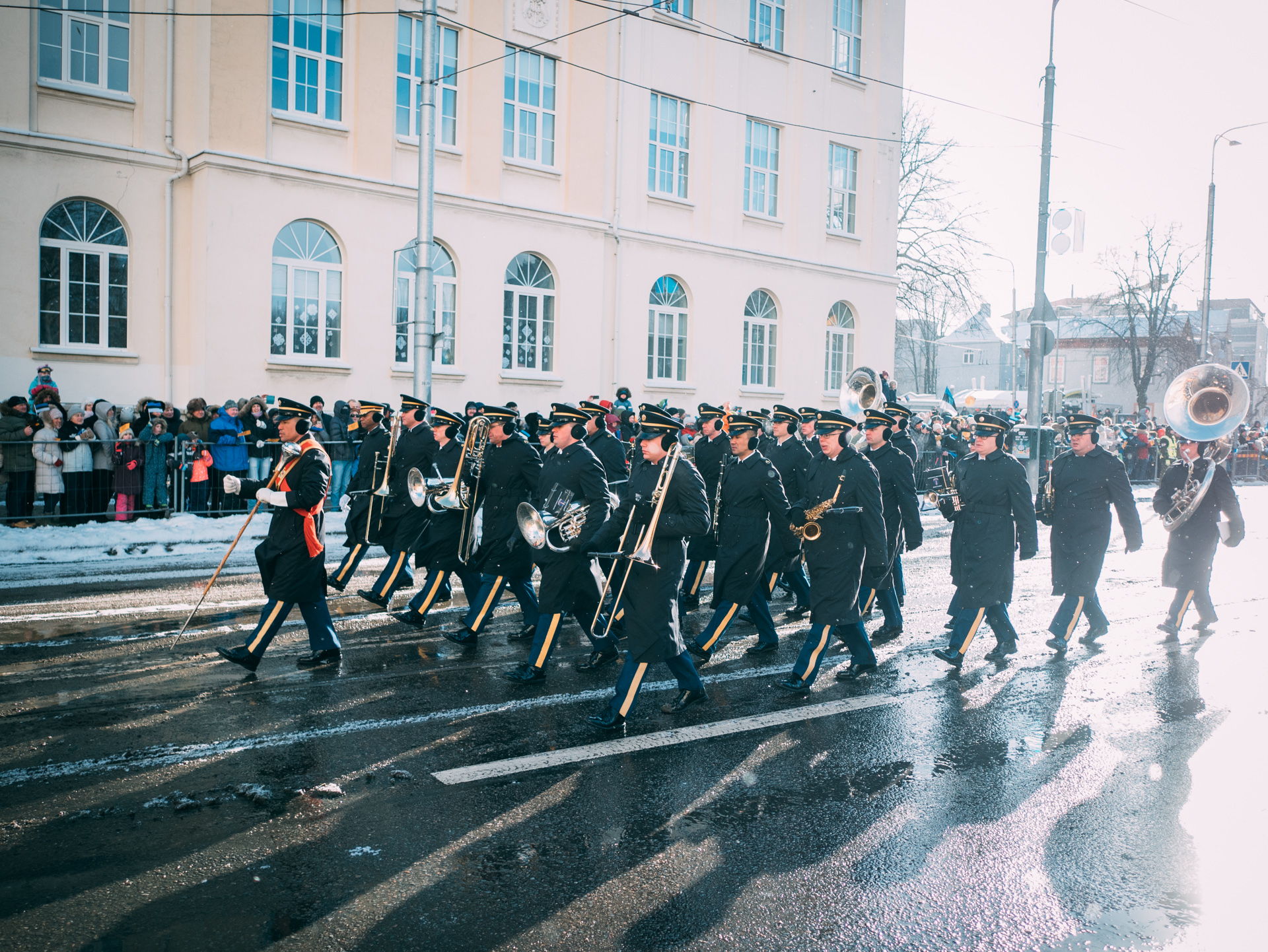
The band during the Estonia 100 Parade.

Event	Date(s)	Notes
Basel Tattoo	August 3, 2018	
Household Division's Beating Retreat	June 12, 2018	It was the first instance of the band's participation in this type of event.
Estonia 100 Parade	February 24, 2018	It took part in the parade as a guest of the Band of the Estonian Defence Forces.
Joint Concert with Polish Air Force Band	February 5, 2018	
Bremen Tattoo	January 27–29, 2017	
Spasskaya Tower Military Music Festival and Tattoo	September 4, 2010	The first time in history that a United States military band had performed on Moscow's Red Square.
Moscow International Festival of Brass Music	May 9, 2005	It had performed inside the Moscow Kremlin for the 60th anniversary of the end of World War Two.

== Band Command Team ==
- Band Commander: Colonel James S. McKenzie
- Band Executive Officer: Captain Jac'kel R. Smalls
- Sergeant Major: Sergeant Major Carlos Salas

== Structure ==
Deutschlandlied, being played by the USAREUR Band & Chorus.

- Band Command Team
- Musical Performance Teams
  - Concert Band
  - Ceremonial Band
  - Marching Band
  - Soldiers' Chorus
  - Dixieland Band
  - Jazz Combo
  - Woodwind Quintet
  - Brass Quintet

=== Concert Band ===
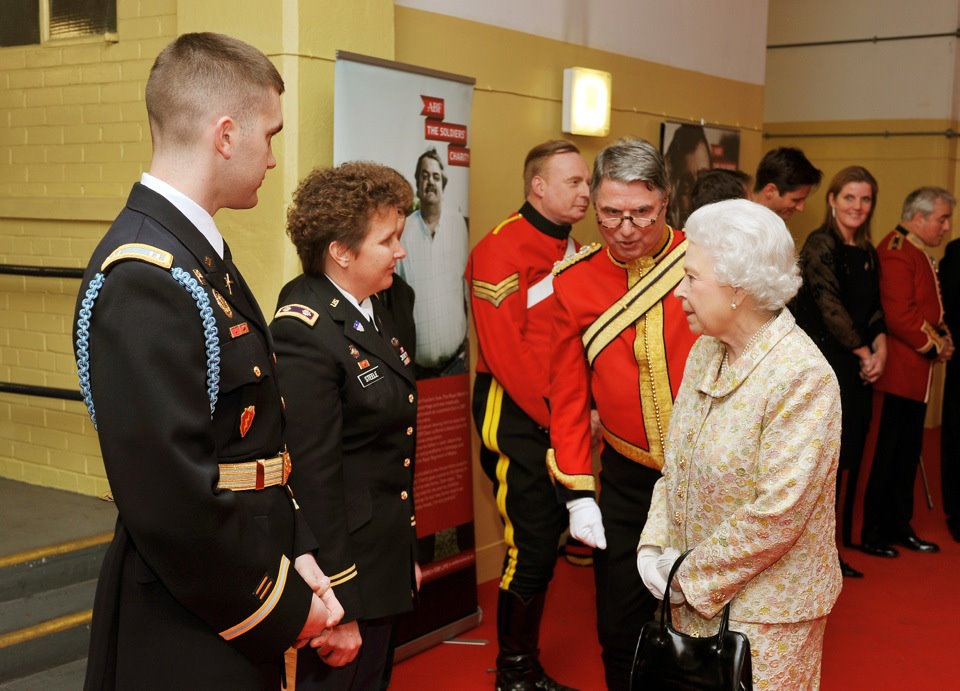
Members of the concert band with Queen Elizabeth II, December 2011.

The concert band specializes in the playing of classical music during indoor performances. It is currently the largest ensemble in the USAREUR Band, employing 60 musicians. To date, the concert band performs at local concert halls, municipal centers, and theatres all over the continent.

=== Ceremonial Band ===
The Ceremonial Band supports the United States Army Europe in ceremonial settings and events which can include Change of command, memorial services, military parades, and other stationary outdoor events. The 30 member unit is notable for representing the USAREUR and the United States at Armistice Day and Victory in Europe Day celebrations that are observed by NATO/European Union nations.

=== Soldiers' Chorus ===
The Soldiers' Chorus is the flagship ensemble of the USAREUR Band. It was founded on April 24, 1967 as the 7th Army Soldiers Chorus originally being assigned to the office of the Adjutant General's office at USAREUR HQ. The group is composed of vocalists who perform music which ranges from Pop music to Broadway music. Their main purpose is to entertain American troops, alongside perform for diplomatic guests.

=== Dixieland Band ===
The Dixieland Band consists of 6 musicians who perform traditionally popular American songs from a specific time period in the United States.

== See also ==
- United States Army Band
- United States military bands
- United States Air Forces in Europe Band
- United States Naval Forces Europe Band
- United States Army Europe
