= 2010 Moscow Victory Day Parade =

Russian military parade

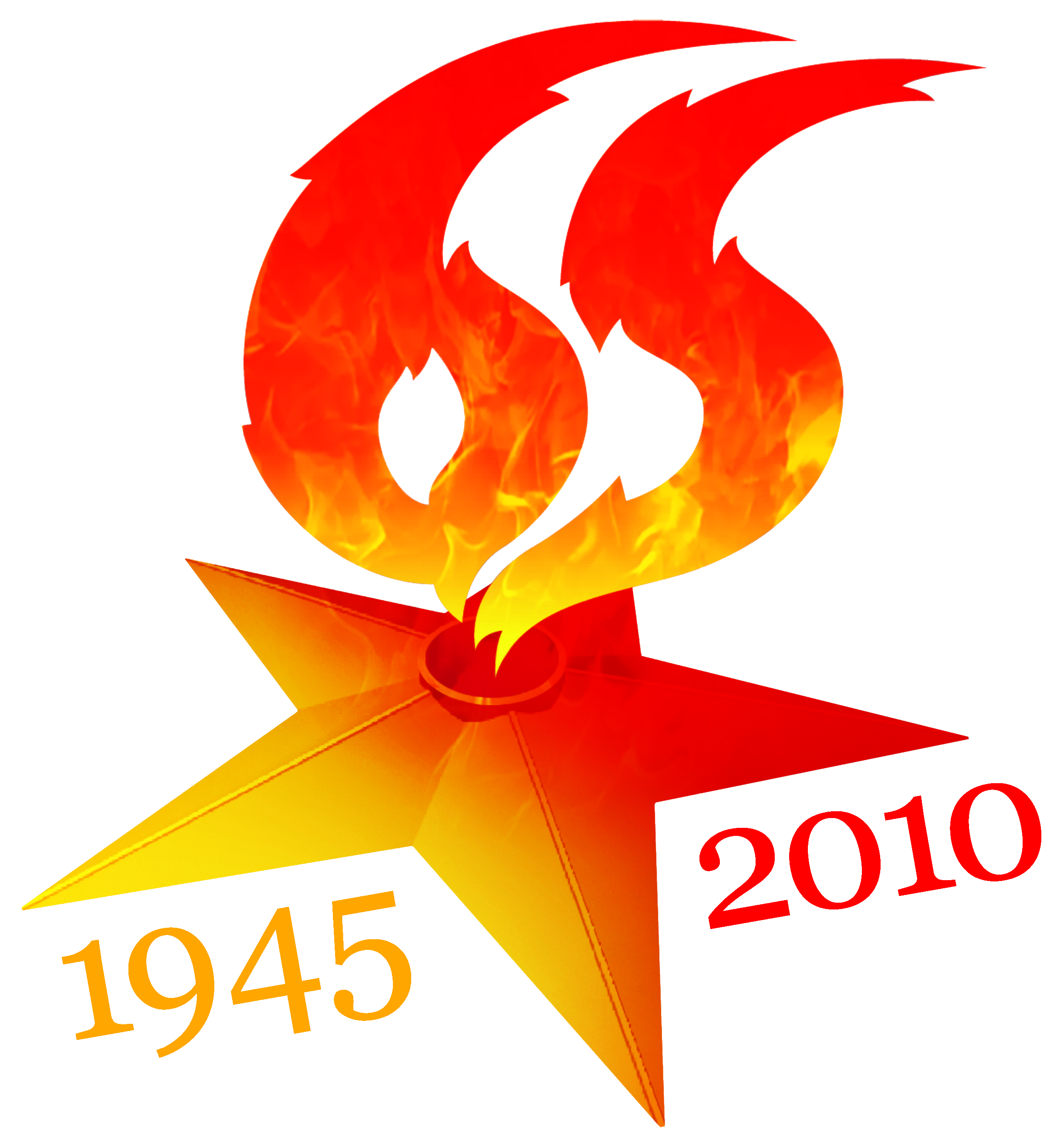
Emblem of the 65th anniversary Victory Day Parade.

Full version of the 2010 Moscow Victory Day Parade.

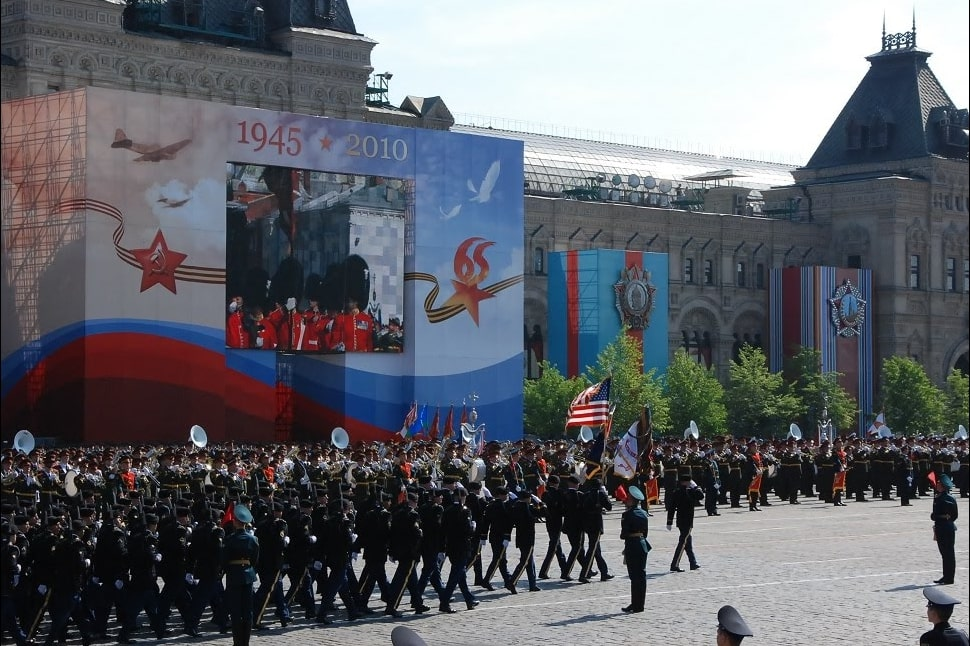
US Army Soldiers in Victory Day Parade Moscow

The 2010 Moscow Victory Day Parade was held on 9 May 2010 to commemorate the 65th anniversary of the capitulation of Nazi Germany in 1945. The parade marks the Soviet Union's victory in the Great Patriotic War.

It was the largest parade held in Moscow, Russia since the Soviet Union's dissolution in 1991, and saw 11,135 troops, 127 aircraft and helicopters, and the new Topol-M mobile intercontinental ballistic missile taking part. For the first time, the 2010 parade on Red Square also included military units from foreign countries who were allied with the Soviet Union during World War II, with representation from France, Poland, the United Kingdom, the United States and members of the Commonwealth of Independent States.

== Military components ==
The 9 May Victory Day Parade in Moscow involved more than 10,000 troops marching, 160 military vehicles and 127 military aircraft, making it the largest parade to be held since the dissolution of the Soviet Union in 1991.

Twenty aviation units of the Russian Air Force took part in the parade, which saw the Ilyushin Il-76, Ilyushin Il-78, Antonov An-124, Sukhoi Su-27, Ilyushin Il-80, Beriev A-50, Tupolev Tu-22M, Sukhoi Su-25, Mikoyan MiG-29, Mikoyan MiG-31, Tupolev Tu-95 and Tupolev Tu-160 performing flypasts. Also taking part for the first time were the Yakovlev Yak-130 jet trainer aircraft and the Mil Mi-26 heavy helicopter. The mobile ICBM Topol-M missile, that first appeared at the 2009 parade, was shown here again for the second consecutive year.

=== Foreign military ===
Foreign troops march on Red Square as part of Victory Day celebrations for the first time.

The 2010 Parade marked the first time that foreign and Commonwealth of Independent States (CIS) soldiers joined Russian forces on Red Square for the parade. Battalions from the CIS included Armenia, Azerbaijan, Belarus, Kazakhstan, Kyrgyzstan, Moldova, Tajikistan and Ukraine among them. Upon request from the government of Turkmenistan, the contingent from Turkmenistan was led by an officer riding on horseback, with the horse (which was a descendant of the horse used during the 1945 parade) being flown into Moscow from Ashgabat. Poland was represented by the Representative Battalion of the Polish Armed Forces. The United Kingdom was represented by a detachment of 76 soldiers from Number 2 Company, 1st Battalion, Welsh Guards, the Central Band of the Royal Air Force and the Band of the Royal Air Force Regiment. The United States was represented by the 2nd Battalion of the 18th Infantry Regiment and the Naval Forces Europe Band. France was represented by pilots and aircraft from the Normandie-Niemen Air Regiment. The combined Russian and foreign massed bands performed Slavsya, Ode to Joy and Den Pobedy at the conclusion of the parade. Russian president Dmitry Medvedev called the inclusion of foreign troops in the parade recognition of their "common victory" in World War II.

The inclusion of foreign troops in the parade was not without controversy. The Communist Party of the Russian Federation held a May Day rally in Moscow, at which several thousand protesters used the rally to decry the inclusion of troops from NATO countries in the parade. A poll run by the Levada Center saw 20 percent of respondents disapproving of the presence of foreign troops, with 8 percent being strongly opposed.

== International dignitaries ==
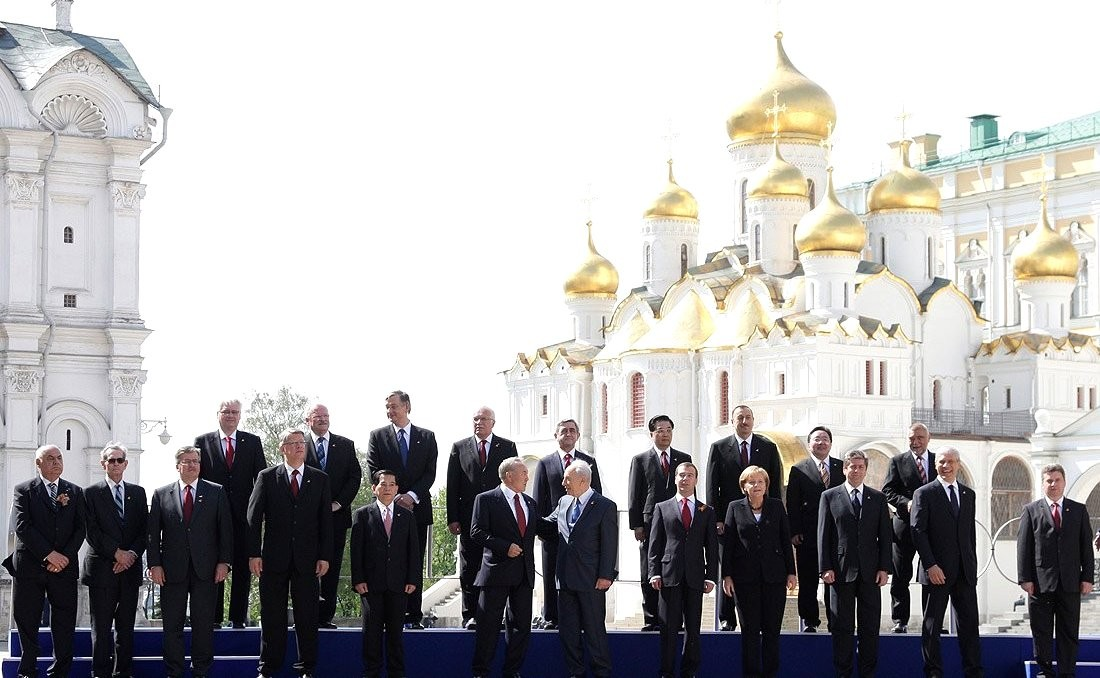
World leaders present at the 2010 Victory Day Parade

Mihai Ghimpu, the acting president of Moldova, stated in late April 2010, after previously accepting an invitation from Russian president Dmitry Medvedev to attend the celebrations, that he would not be attending, claiming "I have no ties with Moscow. Only the victorious are going, what will the defeated do there?" Concerns also arose that a Moldovan contingent would not be able to attend the parade because of financial difficulties in the country, but a Moldovan government source told Kommersant that this was only an excuse, and Ghimpu was choosing to improve Moldova's relations with Romania, which was not invited to attend the celebrations as it was an ally of Germany during World War II. Russian Foreign Minister Sergey Lavrov responded to remarks by Ghimpu, which also included the opinion that Russia should pay Moldova compensation for what he claimed was a "Soviet occupation", by urging Moldovan authorities not to use the occasion for political speculation. King Michael of Romania, the last head of state alive from World War II, was invited by Russian president Medvedev to attend the ceremony.

German chancellor Angela Merkel confirmed her attendance on 30 April, as did Acting President of Poland Bronisław Komorowski. Komorowski's attendance is said to be part of an effort to bolster Poland–Russia relations, which improved after the death of Polish president Lech Kaczyński in a plane crash near Smolensk in early April 2010. Kaczyński is said to have confirmed his attendance at the parade shortly prior to the crash in which he was killed, with reports in the week prior to his death showing that he was questioning his attendance.

Chinese leader Hu Jintao confirmed his attendance at the parade on 3 May. The following day Slovak President Ivan Gašparovič's attendance was confirmed. Other world leaders who confirmed their attendance included Czech president Václav Klaus, French president Nicolas Sarkozy, Italian prime minister Silvio Berlusconi, Serbian president Boris Tadić, Bulgarian president Georgi Parvanov, and Vietnamese president Nguyễn Minh Triết, Leaders from Armenia, Azerbaijan, Estonia, Greece, Israel, Kazakhstan, Latvia, Mongolia and Slovenia also confirmed their attendance. On 8 May, Sarkozy and Berlusconi announced that they wouldn't be attending the parade in Moscow, so that they could deal with the euro area crisis.

Both the United Kingdom and the United States had planned to send high-profile representatives. Gordon Brown, the prime minister of the United Kingdom, was invited to Russia, but because of the UK general election he was unable to attend; the Foreign and Commonwealth Office suggested the Prince of Wales (now Charles III), instead. Barack Obama, the president of the United States, was also unable to attend, but offered Vice President Joe Biden as the U.S. representative; Biden was in Brussels as part of US efforts to improve relations with the European Union. According to The Guardian, both figures were rejected by Russian prime minister Vladimir Putin, however, in what both countries perceived as a diplomatic snub. This was put down to poor British relations with Russia over the UK's continuing refusal to extradite Boris Berezovsky over Russian charges of embezzlement, and because of Biden's close relations with Georgian president Mikheil Saakashvili, who was widely unpopular in Russia because of the 2008 Russia–Georgia War. The UK and US were instead represented by their ambassadors to Russia, Dame Anne Pringle and John Beyrle respectively.

The list of heads of foreign states, governments and international organisations that attended the parade were:

Country	Dignitary	Position	Photo	Country	Dignitary	Position	Photo
Abkhazia	Sergei Bagapsh	President	-	Macedonia	Gjorge Ivanov	President	
Armenia	Serzh Sargsyan	President	-	Mongolia	Tsakhiagiin Elbegdorj	President	
Azerbaijan	Ilham Aliyev	President		Montenegro	Filip Vujanović	President	
Bulgaria	Georgi Parvanov	President		Poland	Bronisław Komorowski	Acting president	
China	Hu Jintao	CCP general secretary President		Serbia	Boris Tadić	President	
Croatia	Ivo Josipović	President		Slovakia	Ivan Gašparovič	President	
Czech Republic	Václav Klaus	President		Slovenia	Danilo Türk	President	
Estonia	Toomas Hendrik Ilves	President		South Ossetia	Eduard Kokoity	President	-
Germany	Angela Merkel	Chancellor		Tajikistan	Emomalii Rahmon	President	
Israel	Shimon Peres	President		Turkmenistan	Gurbanguly Berdimuhamedow	President	
Kazakhstan	Nursultan Nazarbayev	President		Vietnam	Nguyễn Minh Triết	President	
Latvia	Valdis Zatlers	President		-	-	-	-

== The parade ==
Speech of Russian president Dmitry Medvedev at the Victory Day Parade on 9 May 2010 (transcript in English)

At 10:00 am (MSK), the clock of Spasskaya Tower in the Moscow Kremlin rang and signalled the beginning of the parade commemorating the defeat of Nazi Germany by the Union of Soviet Socialist Republics in the Great Patriotic War. The event then began with the display of the flag of Russia and the Victory Banner. After this, commander of the Moscow Military District Colonel General Valery Gerasimov, who commanded the parade, and Anatoly Serdyukov, the Russian Minister of Defence, who inspected the parade, joined and inspected the troops. At 10:14 am, Serdyukov reported to Supreme Commander-in-Chief, and Russian president, Dmitry Medvedev on the readiness of the troops.

After this President Medvedev made a speech in which he stated, "Sixty-five years ago Nazism was vanquished. The machine that was wiping out whole nations was stopped. Peace returned to our country and to Europe as a whole. An end was put to the ideology that was destroying the fundamentals of civilisation." Medvedev also emphasised the role the Soviet Union played in the war, bearing the brunt of Nazi attacks, in which some three-quarters of their military forces participated.

After his speech and the playing of the National Anthem of the Russian Federation, a parade of troops took place on Red Square, led by the Drummers' Company of the Moscow Military Conservatoire, Military University of the MDRF. Some 10,500 thousand troops marched, and approximately 1,000 troops from the Commonwealth of Independent States, Poland, the United Kingdom, France and the United States also marched. This was followed by a procession of 161 pieces of military hardware through Red Square, and 127 aircraft and helicopters making a flypast over the Kremlin to form the number "65".

The historical part of the parade began with the entry onto Red Square of infantry, air force and navy representatives in uniforms resplendent of the Great Patriotic War. Behind them troops from Armenia, Azerbaijan, Belarus, Kazakhstan, Kyrgyzstan, Moldova, Tajikistan and Ukraine marched. Each of these nations of the Commonwealth of Independent States were represented by some 70 troops. Following the participants from the CIS, was a guard of honour from the Polish Army, and they were followed by 71 members of the British Army, 76 members of the United States military, and 68 members of the French military. At the rear of the foreign segment of the parade were 68 troops from Turkmenistan, led by a commander riding on horseback, of which the horse has blood-lines to the horse lent to Marshal Georgy Zhukov by Stalin for the original parade. It was followed by the Presidential Regiment Cavalry Escort Squadron, wearing GPW uniforms of the Soviet Cavalry forces.

== Parade Participants ==
Note: Those indicated in bold indicate first parade appearance, those indicated with italic indicate double or multiple parade appearances.

- Colonel General Valery Gerasimov, Commander of the Moscow Military District (parade commander)
- Defense Minister of the Russian Federation Anatoliy Serdyukov (parade inspector)

=== Military Bands in Attendance ===
- Massed Military Bands led and conducted by Major General Valery Khalilov and composed of:
  - Headquarters Band of the Moscow Military District under Lt. Col. V Shevernev
  - Central Military Band of the MDRF under Col. Andrei Kolotushkin and Drum Major of the Central Band Lt. Col. Sergey Durygin
  - Headquarters Band, of the Ministry of Internal Affairs of the Russian Federation
  - Central Band of the Russian Navy
  - Band of the Moscow Military Conservatoire, Military University of the Ministry of Defense of the Russian Federation
  - HQ Band of the Ministry of Emergency Situations of the Russian Federation
  - Band of the Combined Arms Academy of the Armed Forces of the Russian Federation
  - Band of the Military Technological University
  - Band of the Peter the Great Military Academy of the Rocket Forces of Strategic Importance
  - Central Band of the Royal Air Force
  - The Band of the Royal Air Force Regiment
  - United States Navy Naval Forces Europe Band
  - Wind and Fanfare Band of the French Army Ile-de-France Military Region
  - Band of the 5th Tamanskaya Guards Ind. Motor Rifle Brigade "Mikhail Kalinin"
  - Band of the 4th Kantemir Guards Armored Brigade "Yuri Andropov"
  - Band of the 27th Sevastopol Guards Motor Rifle Brigade
  - Central Band of the Russian Air Force
  - Band of the Gagarin-Zhukovsky Combined Air Force Academy
  - Headquarters Band of the Russian Airborne Troops
  - Band of the Ryazan Airborne Command Academy
  - Headquarters Band of the Federal Security Service
  - Band of the MES Civil Defense Academy
  - Moscow Combined Band of the Ministry of Internal Affairs
- Drummers Company, Moscow Military Conservatoire, Military University of the Ministry of Defense of the Russian Federation

=== Ground Column ===
- 154th Moscow Garrison Commandant's Honor Guard Regiment and Color Guards
  - Colors Party composed of:
    - Flag of Russia
    - Victory Banner
    - Banner of the Armed Forces of the Russian Federation
  - Combined Honor Guards Company of the Armed Forces
- Historical troops and colors
  - Front Standard bearers
  - Historical Colors Party
  - Historical troops of the Soviet Armed Forces
    - Red Army
    - Soviet Air Forces
    - Soviet Navy
    - WPRA Army Cavalry Corps and Cavalry Mechanized Groups Command (represented by the Cavalry Escort Squadron of the Presidential Regiment)
- Forces of the Commonwealth of Independent States and Allied nations
  - (Azerbaijan) **Azerbaijani peacekeeping forces**
  - **Yerevan Capital Regiment, Armed Forces of Armenia**
  - **5th Spetsnaz Brigade of the Armed Forces of Belarus**
  - **Honor Guard Company of the Ministry of Defense of Kazakhstan**
  - **8th Guards Motor Rifle Division of the Armed Forces of Kyrgyzstan**
  - (Moldova) **Honor Guard Company of the Moldovan National Army**
  - **Military Institute of the Ministry of Defense of Tajikistan**
  - (Ukraine) **Ukrainian Ground Forces Military Academy**
  - (Poland) **Representative Battalion of the Polish Armed Forces**
  - (United Kingdom) **2nd Coy. 1st Battalion, Welsh Guards, British Army**
  - **18th Infantry Regiment, United States Army**
  - (France) **Normandie-Niemen Air Regiment, French Air Force**
  - **Independent Honor Guard Battalion of the Ministry of Defence of Turkmenistan**
- Armed Forces of the Russian Federation, Ministry of Internal Affairs of the Russian Federation, Ministry of Emergency Situations and Civil Defense of the Russian Federation, Federal Security Service of the Russian Federation
  - Combined Arms Academy of the Armed Forces of the Russian Federation
  - Military University of the Ministry of Defense of the Russian Federation
  - Gagarin-Zhukovsky Combined Air Force Academy
  - Air Force Gen. Staff School of Rocket Forces and Anti-Air Defense Training
  - Baltic Naval Military Institute "Admiral Fyodor Ushakov"
  - 336th Separate Bialystok Guards Naval Infantry Brigade of the Baltic Fleet
  - Peter the Great Military Academy of the Strategic Missile Forces
  - **Moscow Military Rocket Forces Institute, SRFI RF**
  - **Military Space Academy**
  - Moscow Military Space Institute of Radio Electronics
  - Ryazan Airborne Command Academy "Gen. of the Army Vasily Margelov"
  - **331st Guards Airborne Regiment**
  - Moscow Border Service Institute of the Federal Security Service
  - OMSDON 1st Internal Troops Division of the Ministry of Internal Affairs of the Russian Federation "Felix Dzenzhinsky"
  - Civil Defense Academy of the Ministry of Emergency Situations of the Russian Federation
  - Military Technological University
  - 5th Tamanskaya Guards Ind. Motor Rifle Brigade "Mikhail Kalinin"
  - 27th Sevastopol Guards Motor Rifle Brigade
  - Moscow Military Commanders Training School "Supreme Soviet of the RSFSR/Russian Federation"

=== Mobile Column ===
- T-34
- GAZ-67B
- SU-100
- GAZ-2975
- **BPM-97**
- BTR-80
- BMP-3
- T-90
- 2S19 Msta
- Buk missile system
- **TOS-1**
- BM-30 Smerch
- S-400 Triumf
- **Pantsir-S1**
- Iskander-M
- Topol-M

=== Air Column Flypast ===
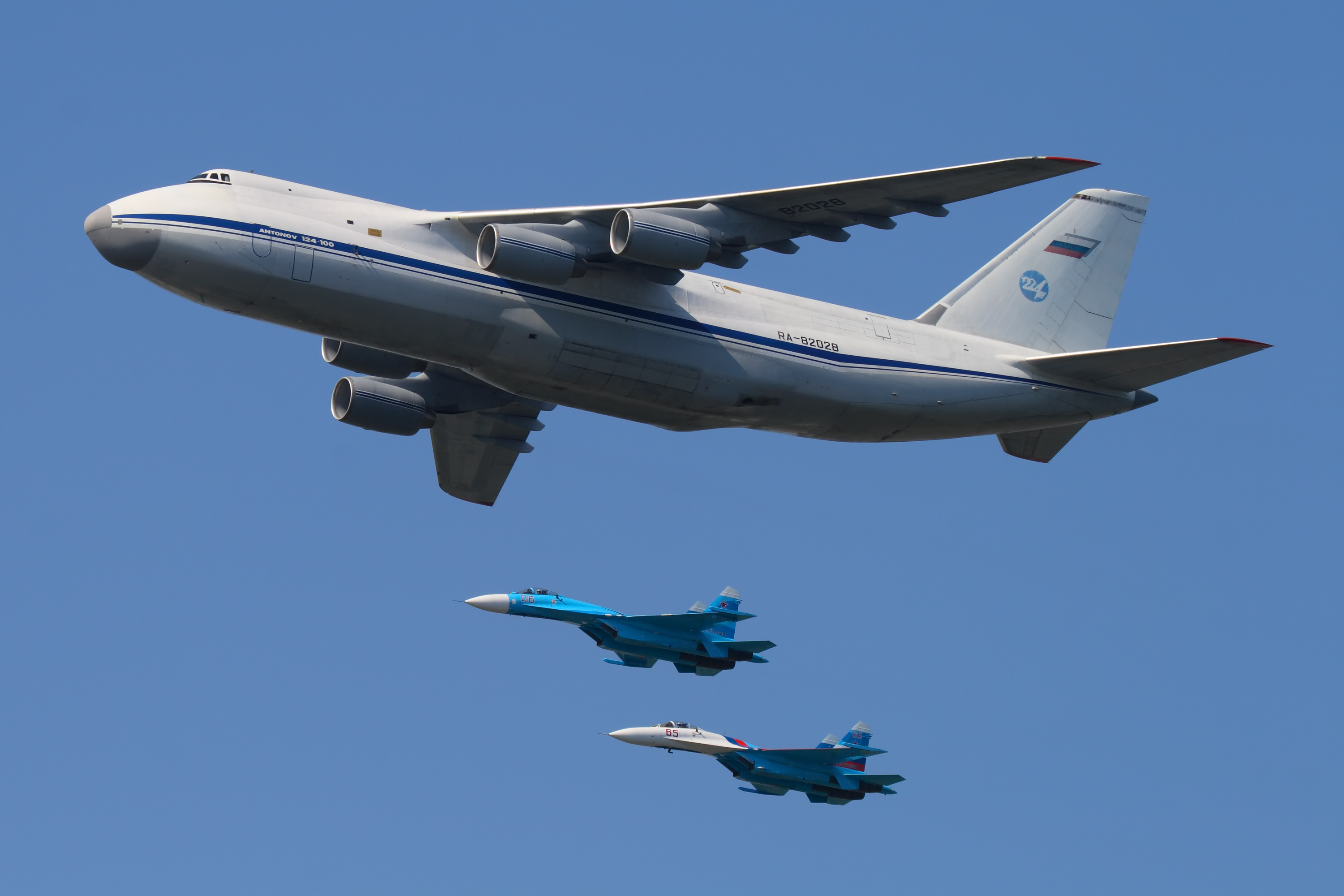
Antonov An-124 of 224th Flight Unit with 2 Sukhoi Su-27s of the Russian Knights aerobatic team.

- Mi-8 Colors Party
- Mi-24
- Mi-28
- Mil Mi-35
- Yak-130
- MiG-29
- Sukhoi Su-24
- Sukhoi Su-34
- Sukhoi Su-27
- Tu-22M3
- Tu-95
- Tu-160
- Joint formation squadron of Russian Knights and Strizhi (Sukhoi Su-27 and Mikoyan MiG-29)
- Il-78
- Beriev A-50
- Sukhoi Su-25
- Antonov An-124

== Music ==
Flag procession, Inspection, and Address

- Sacred War (Священная Война) by Alexandr Alexandrov
- Slow March of the Tankmen (Встречный Марш Танкистов) by Semyon Tchernetsky
- Slow March to Carry the War Flag (Встречный Марш для выноса Боевого Знамени) by Dmitriy Valentinovich Kadeyev
- Slow March of the Guards of the Navy (Гвардейский Встречный Марш Военно-Морского Флота) by Nikolai Pavlocich Ivanov-Radkevich
- Slow March of the Officers Schools (Встречный Марш офицерских училищ) by Semyon Tchernetsky
- Slow March (Встречный Марш) by Dmitry Pertsev
- Slow March of the Red Army (Встречный Марш Красной Армии) by Semyon Tchernetsky
- Slow March (Встречный Марш) by Evgeny Aksyonov
- March of the Preobrazhensky Regiment (Марш Преображенского Полка)
- Parade Fanfare All Listen! (Парадная Фанфара "Слушайте все!”) by Andrei Golovin
- State Anthem of the Russian Federation (Государственный Гимн Российской Федерации) by Alexander Alexandrov
- Signal Retreat (Сигнал "Отбой")

Infantry Column

- Triumph of the Winners (Триумф Победителей)
- Ballad of a Soldier (Баллада о Солдате) by Vasily Pavlovich Solovyov-Sedoy
- March of the Defenders of Moscow (Марш защи́тников Москвы́) by Boris Alexandrovich Mokroysov
- March Hero (Марш "Герой")
- On Guard for the Peace (На страже Мира) by Boris Alexandrovich Diev
- Air March (Авиамарш) by Yuliy Abramovich Khait
- Crew is One Family (Экипаж - одна семья) by Viktor Vasilyevich Pleshak
- Artillery March (Марш Артиллеристов) by Tikhon Khrennikov
- March of the Cosmonauts/Friends, I believe (Марш Космонавтов /Я верю, друзья) by Oskar Borisovich Feltsman
- We Need One Victory (Нам Нужна Одна Победа) by Bulat Shalvovich Okudzhava
- To Serve Russia (Служить России) by Eduard Cemyonovich Khanok
- Victory Day (День Победы) by David Fyodorovich Tukhmanov

Vehicle Column

- March General Miloradovich (Марш "Генерал Милорадович") by Valery Khalilov
- March Hero (Марш "Герой")
- Katyusha (Катюша) by Matvey Blanter
- March Kant (Марш "Кант") by Valery Khalilov
- March of the Tankmen (Марш Танкистов) by Semyon Tchernetsky
- March Hero (Марш "Герой") by Unknown
- Katyusha (Катюша) by Matvey Blanter
- March Kant (Марш "Кант") by Valery Khalilov
- March of the Tankmen (Марш Танкистов) by Semyon Tchernetsky

Flypast Column

- Air March (Авиамарш) by Yuliy Abramovich Khait
- March Airplanes – First of all (Марш "Первым делом самолёты") by Vasili-Solovyov-Sedoi
- It’s time to go (Пора в путь-дорогу) by Vasili-Solovyov-Sedoi
- Air March (Авиамарш) by Yuliy Abramovich Khait
- March Airplanes – First of all (Марш "Первым делом самолёты") by Vasili-Solovyov-Sedoi
- Melody of Victory (Мелодия Победы) by Sergey Danilchenko

Conclusion

- Glory (Славься) by Mikhail Glinka
- Ode to Joy by Ludwig van Beethoven
- Victory Day (День Победы) by David Fyodorovich Tukhmanov
- Farewell of Slavianka (Прощание Славянки) by Vasiliy Agapkin

== Gallery ==
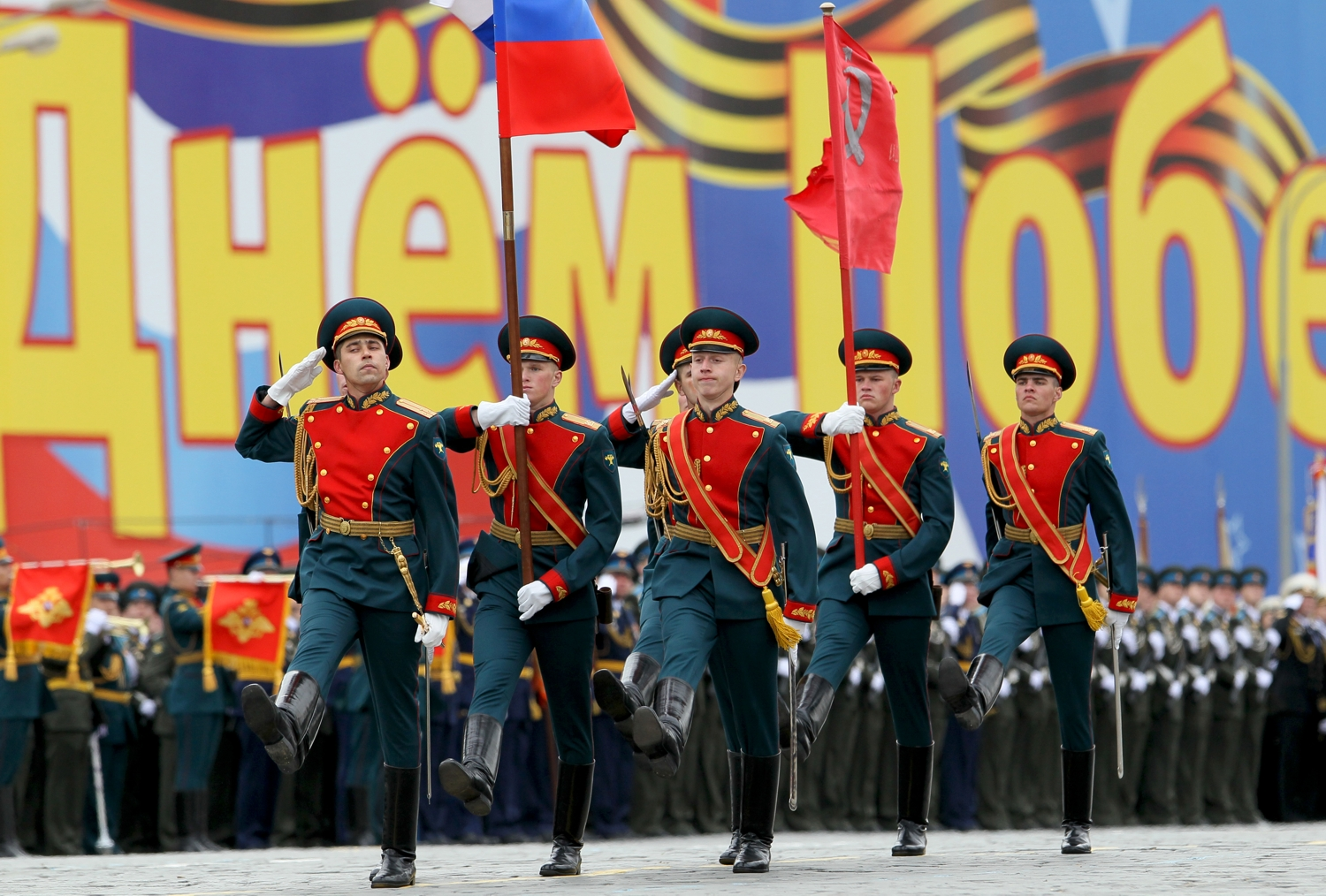
Honour guard marching with the Russian flag and the Victory Banner

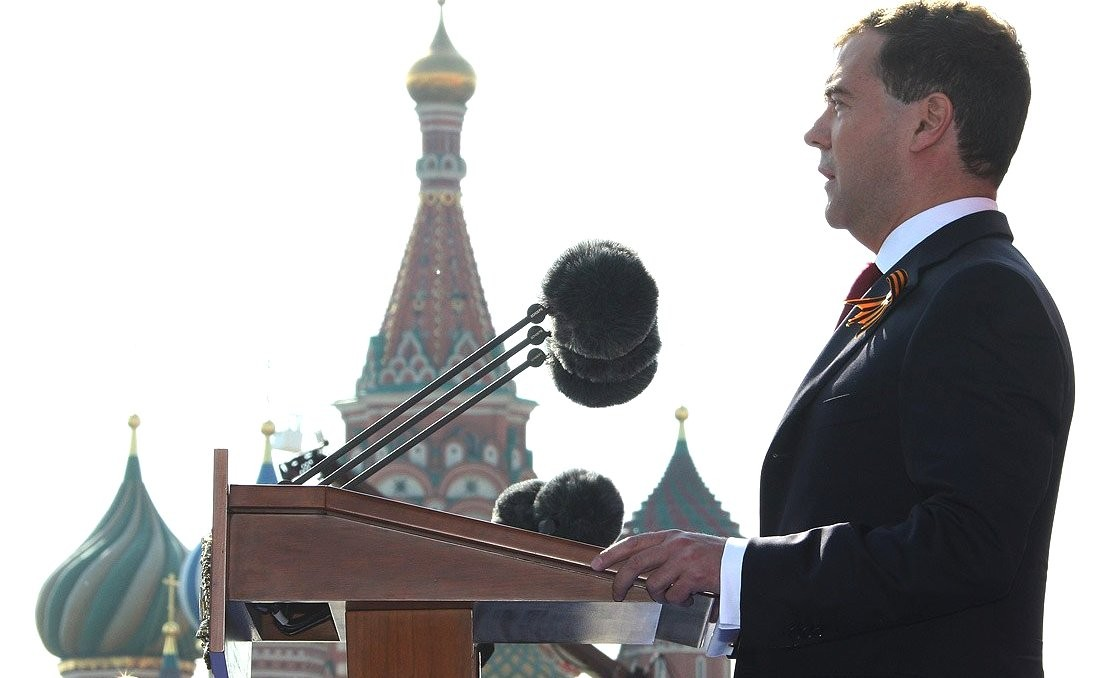
President Dmitry Medvedev making a speech

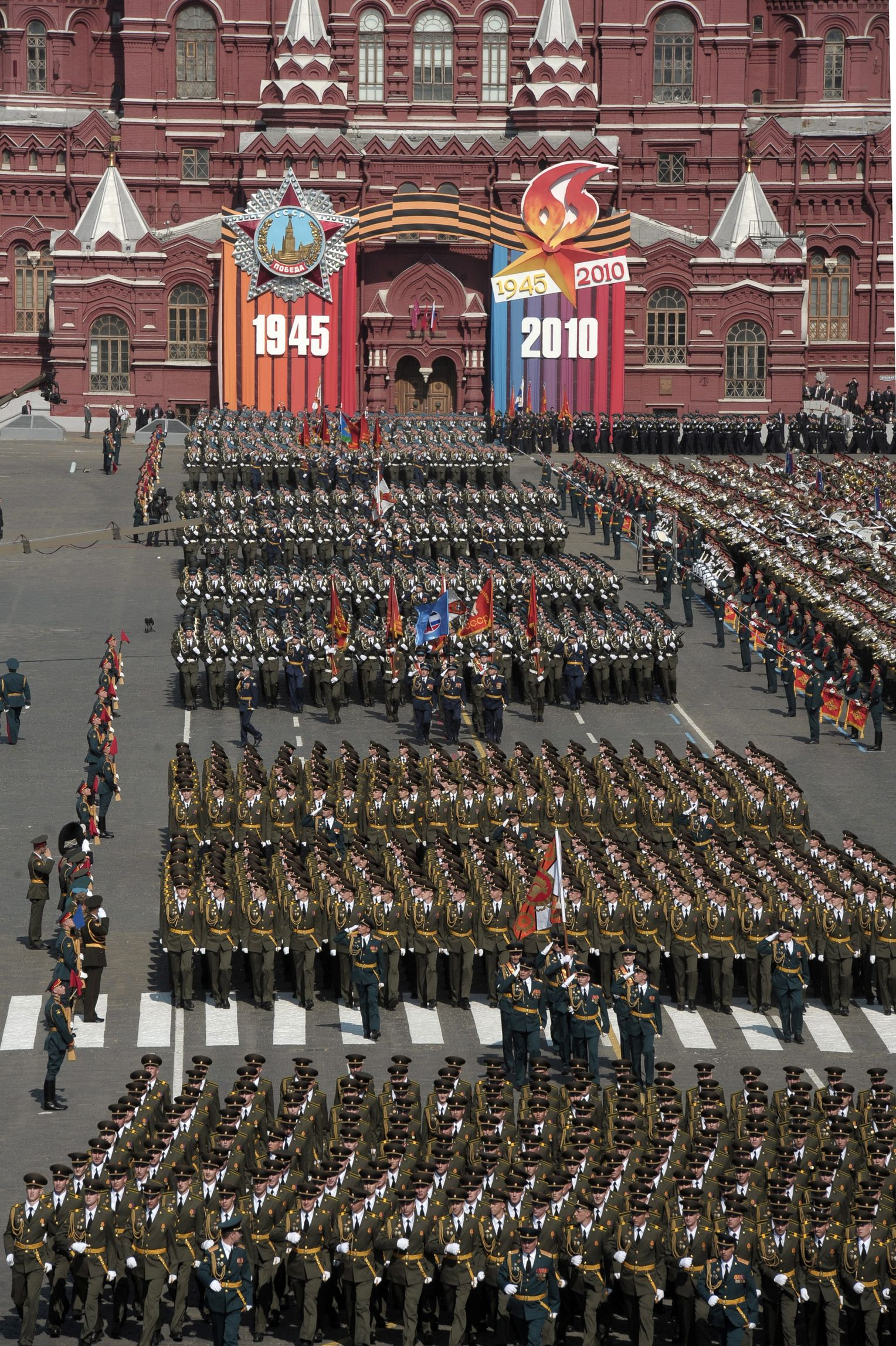
Overview of troops taking part in the parade

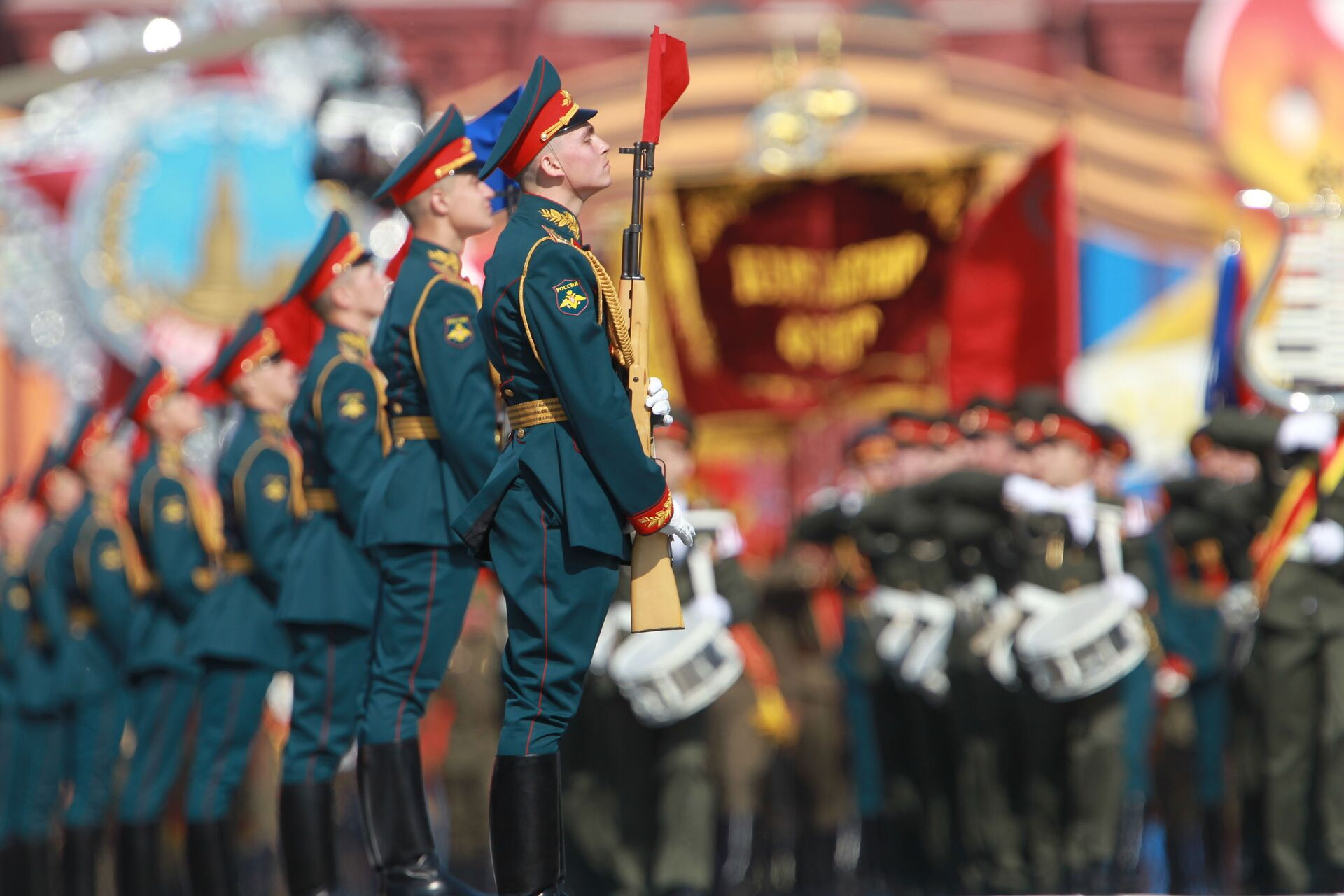
Soldiers of the Armed Forces of the Russian Federation

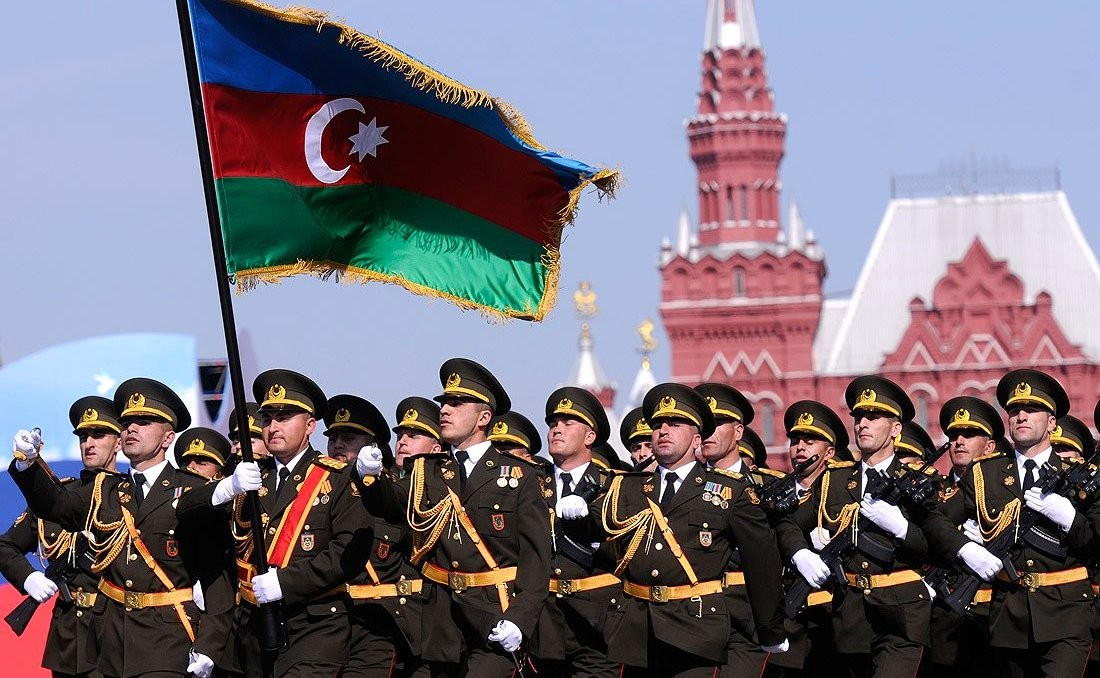
Contingent from the Azerbaijani military

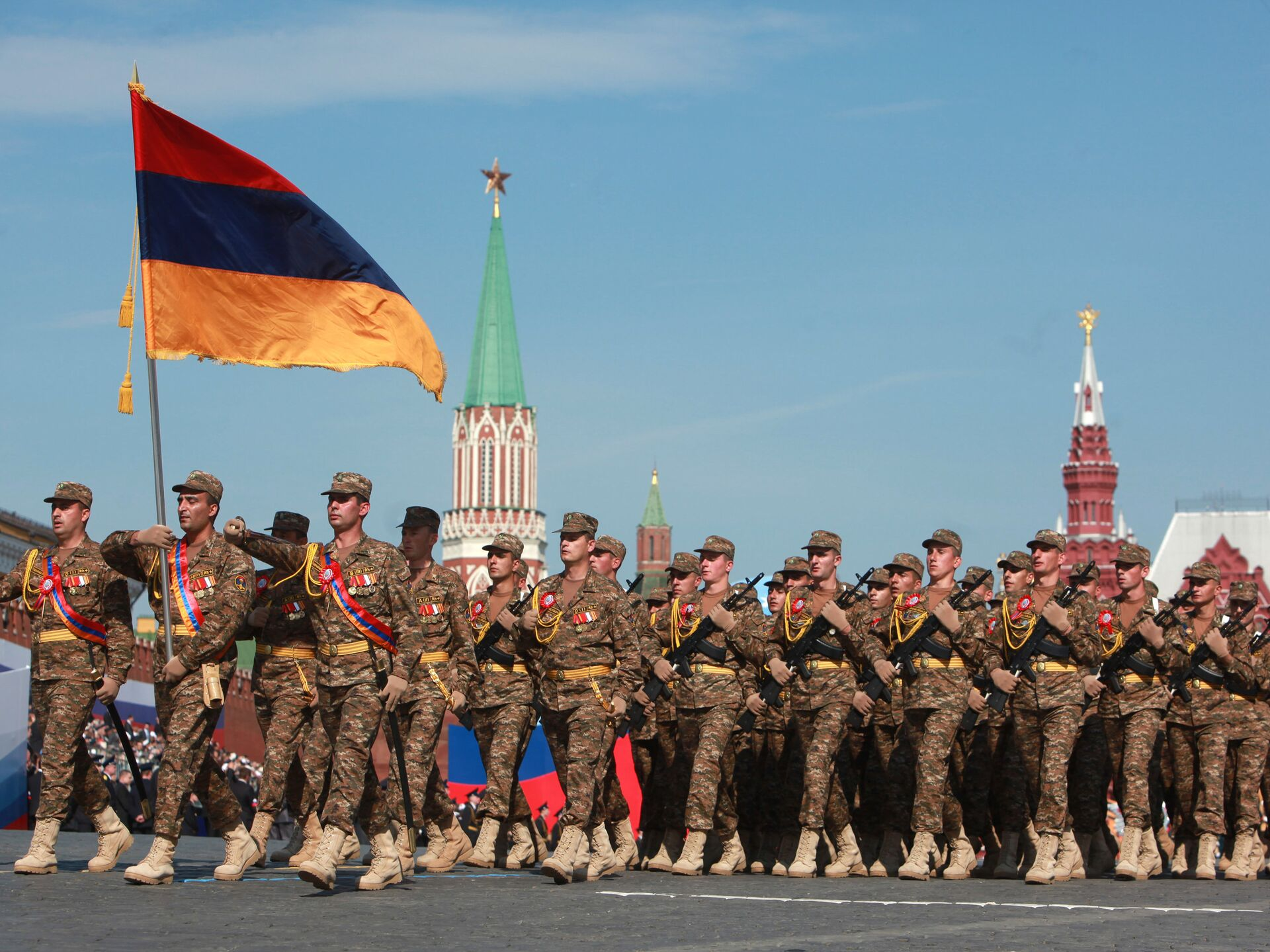
Contingent from the Armenian military

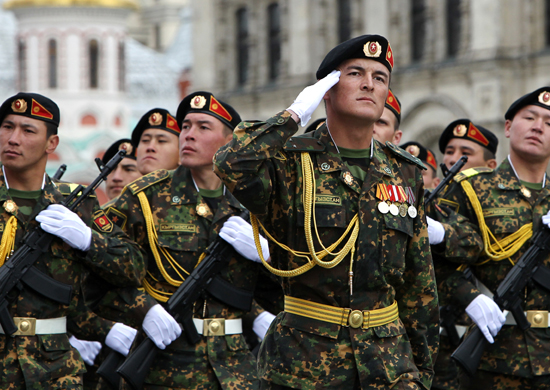
Contingent from the Kyrgyz Army

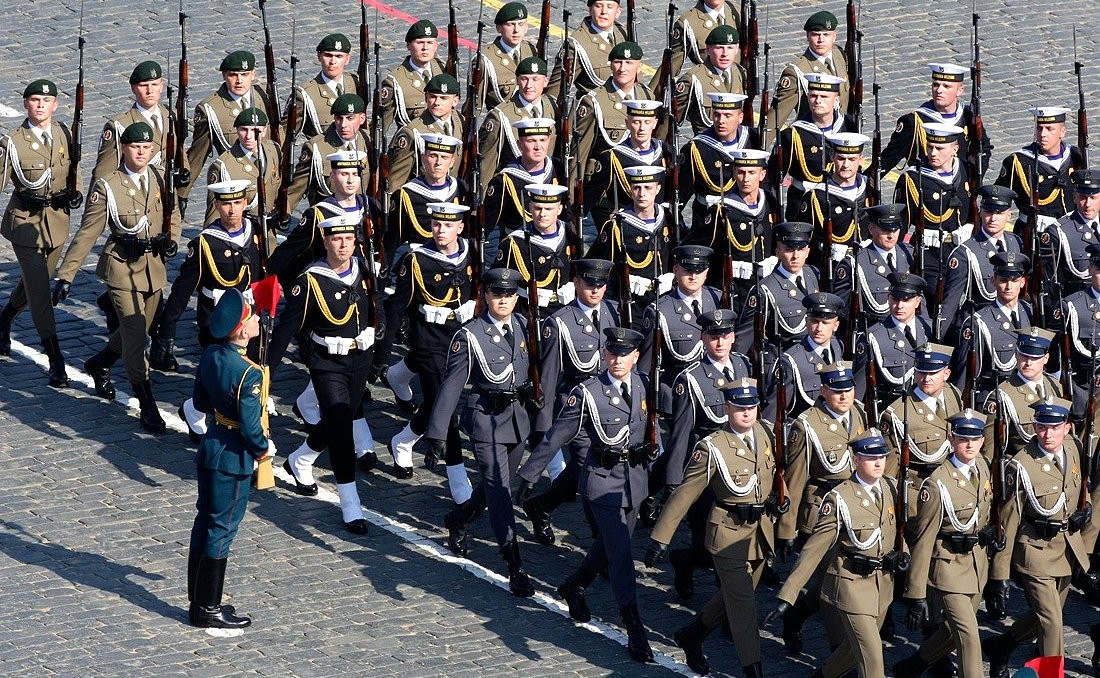
Contingent from the Polish military

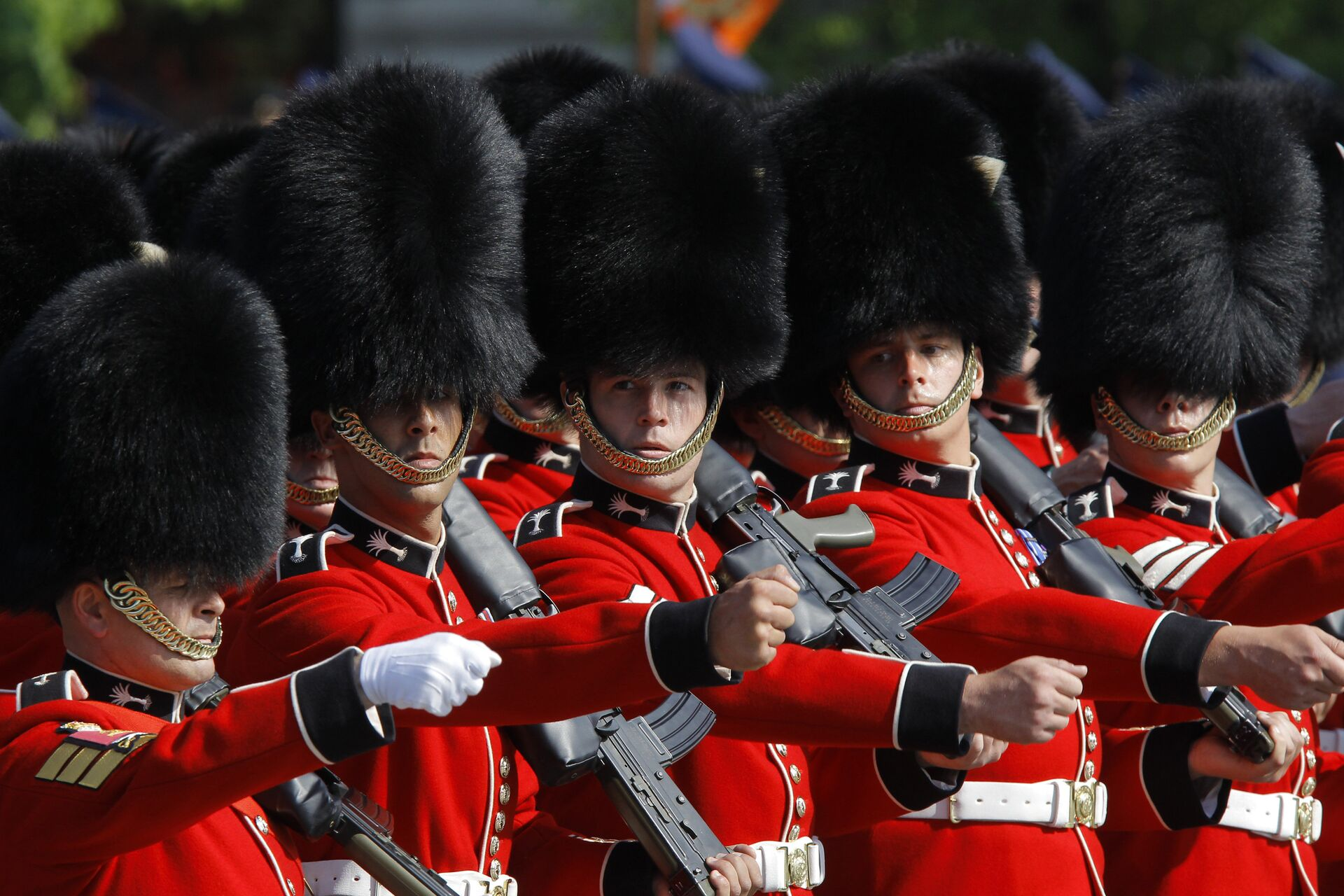
Welsh Guards from the British military

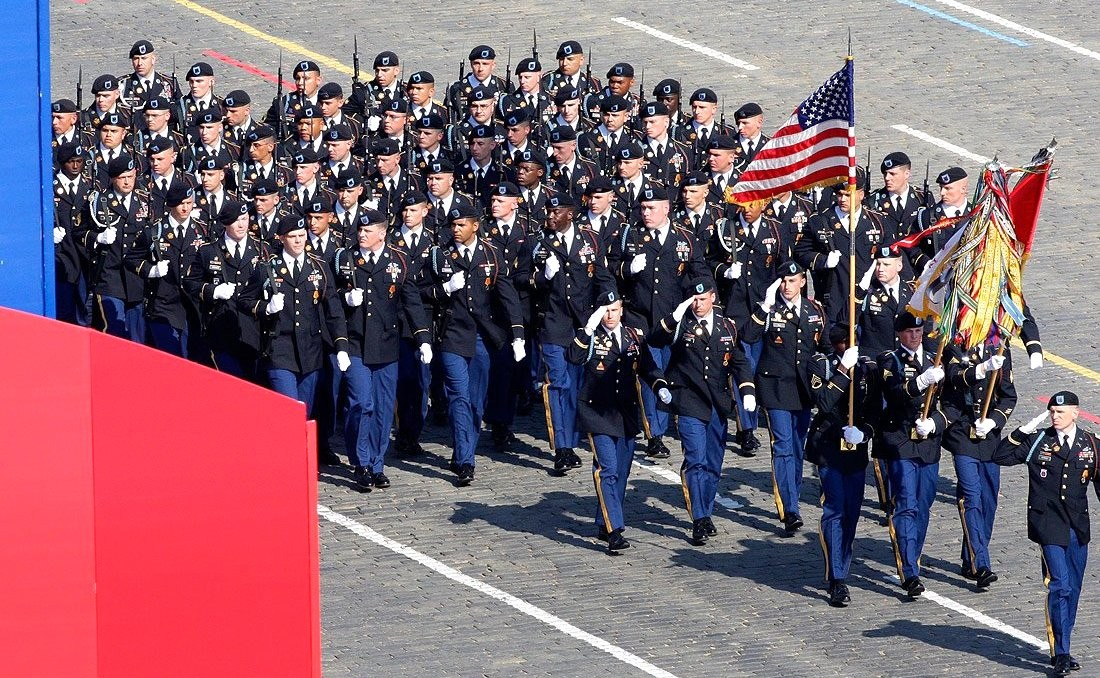
Contingent from the United States Army's 18th Infantry Regiment

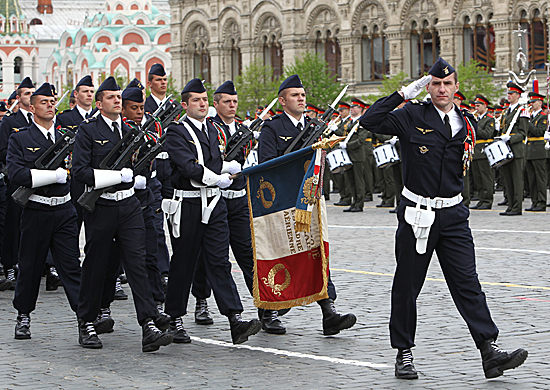
Contingent from the French Army

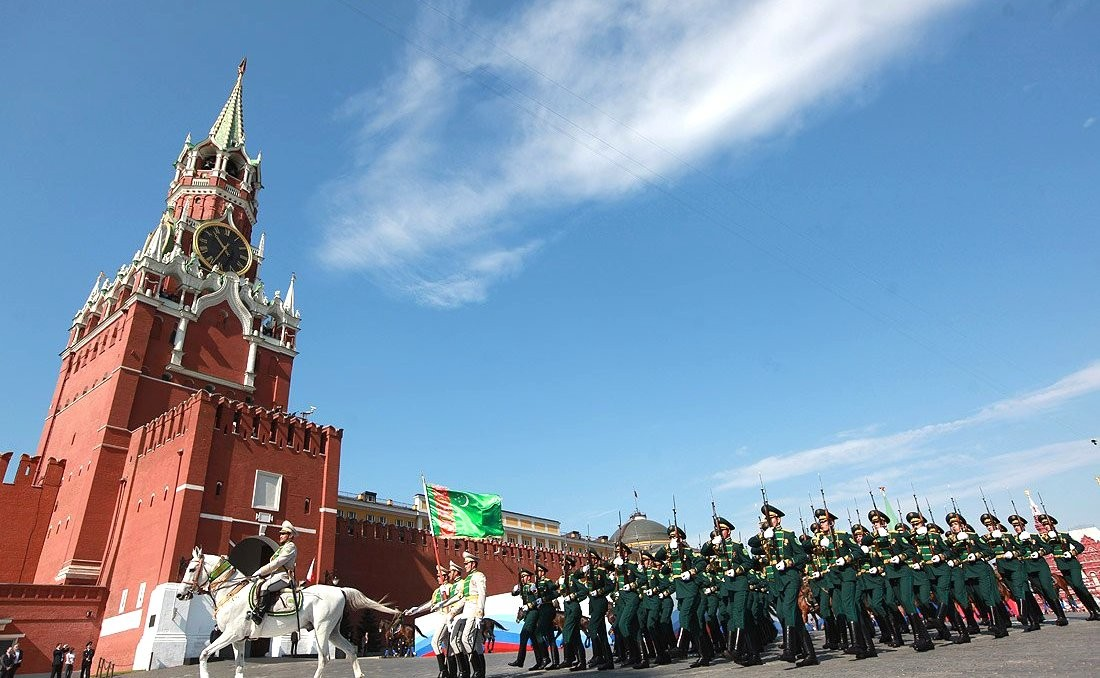
Contingent from the Turkmen military

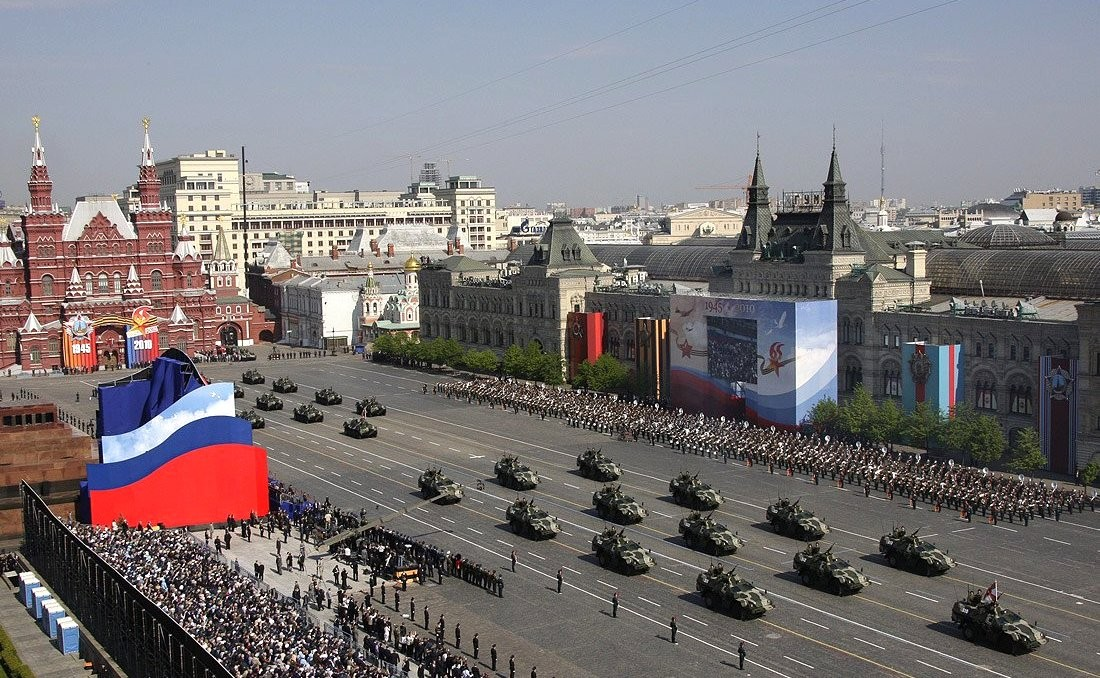
Military vehicles on the Red Square

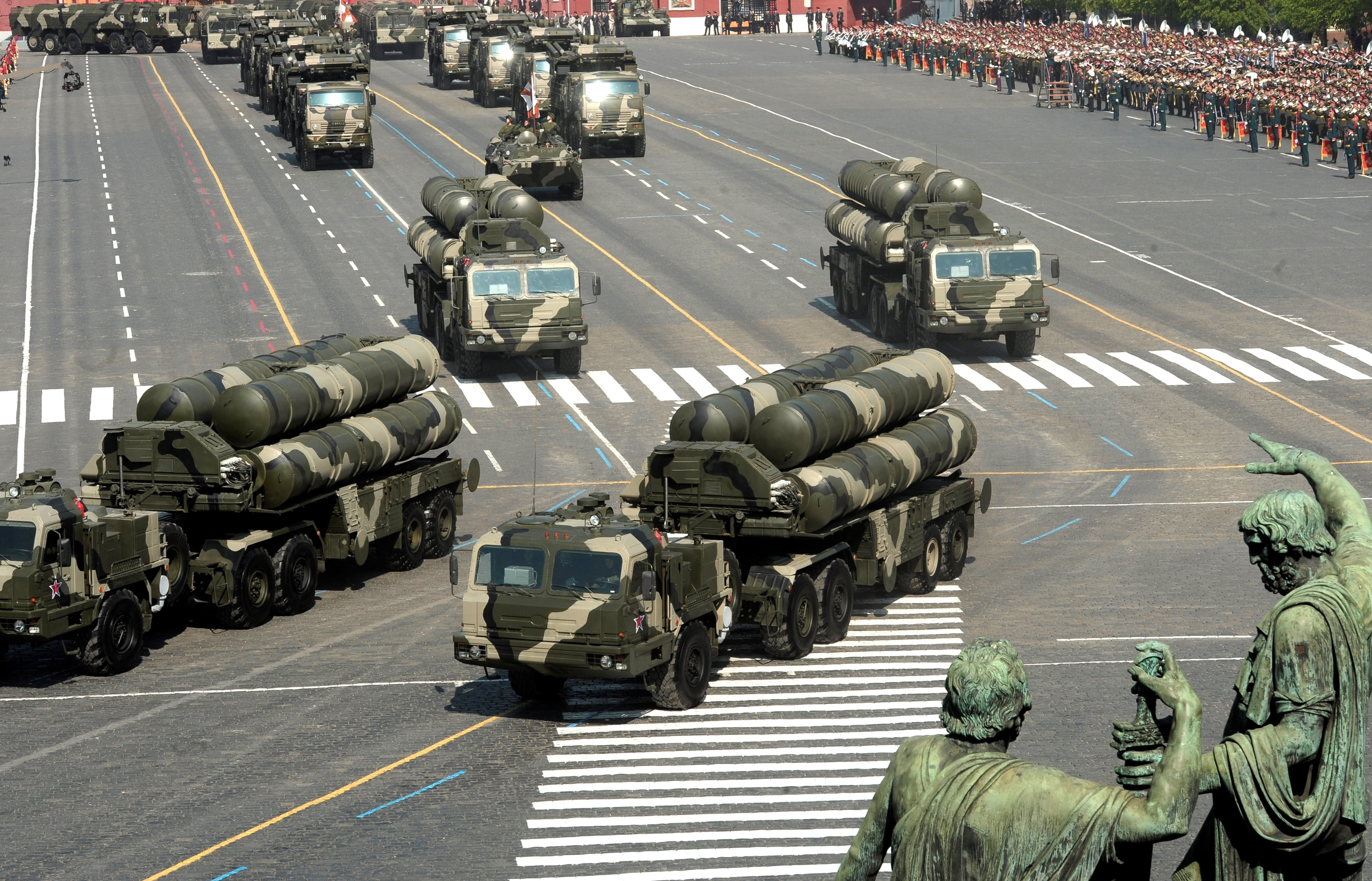
S-400 on the parade

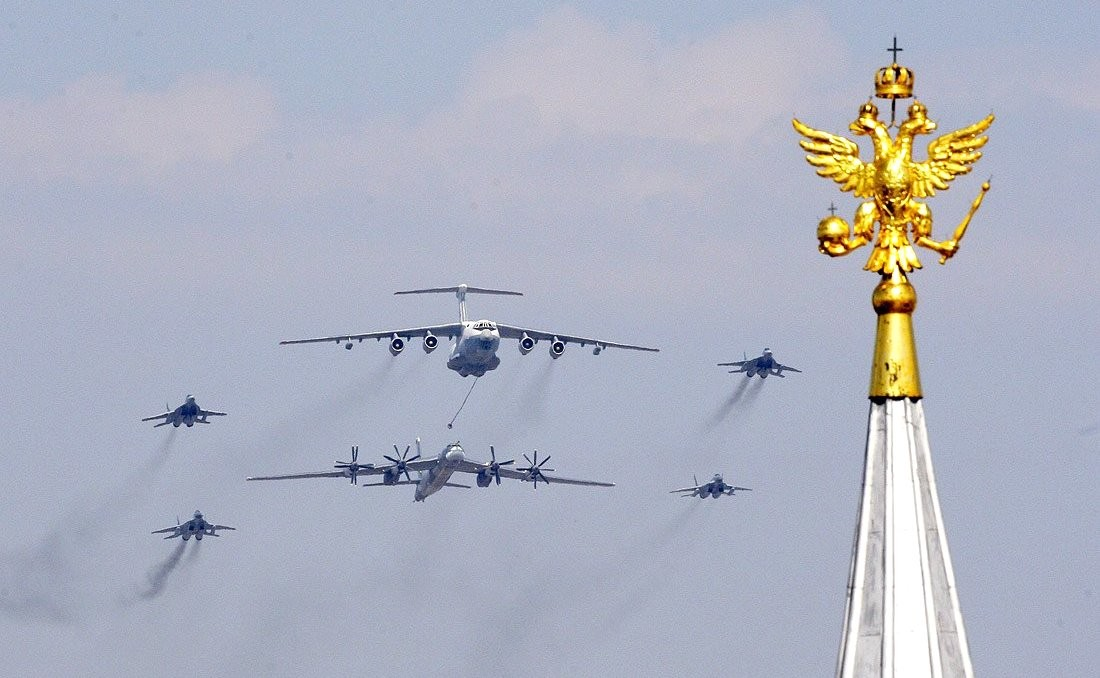
Aircraft from the Russian Air Force and the Coat of Arms of Russia

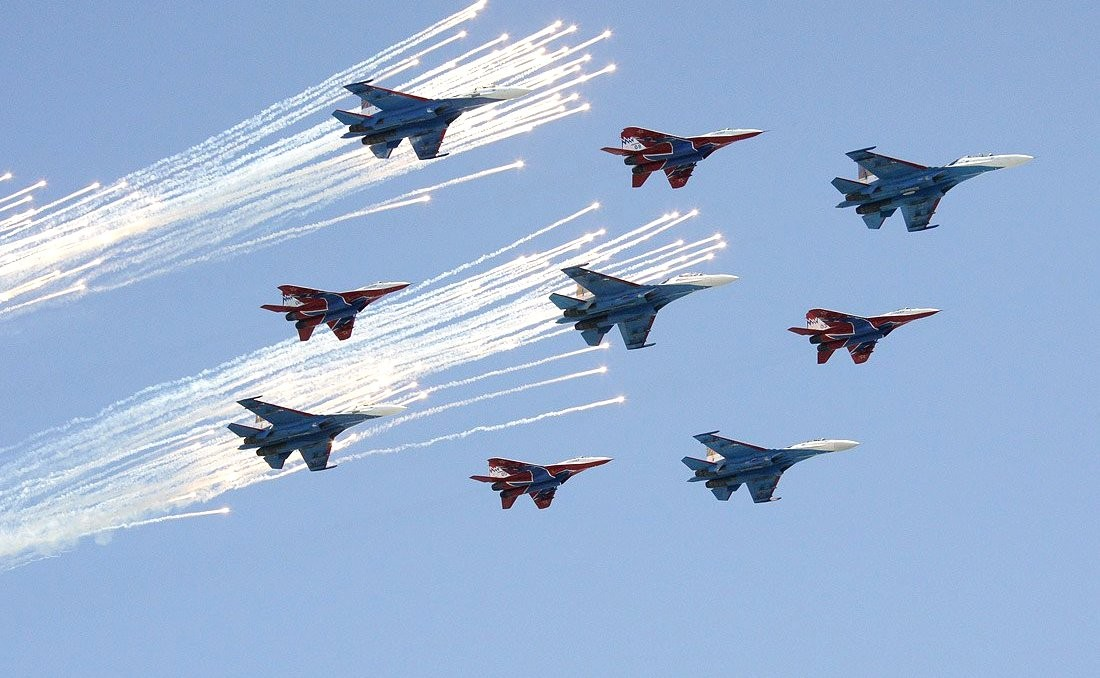
Russian Knights and Strizhi over the Red Square

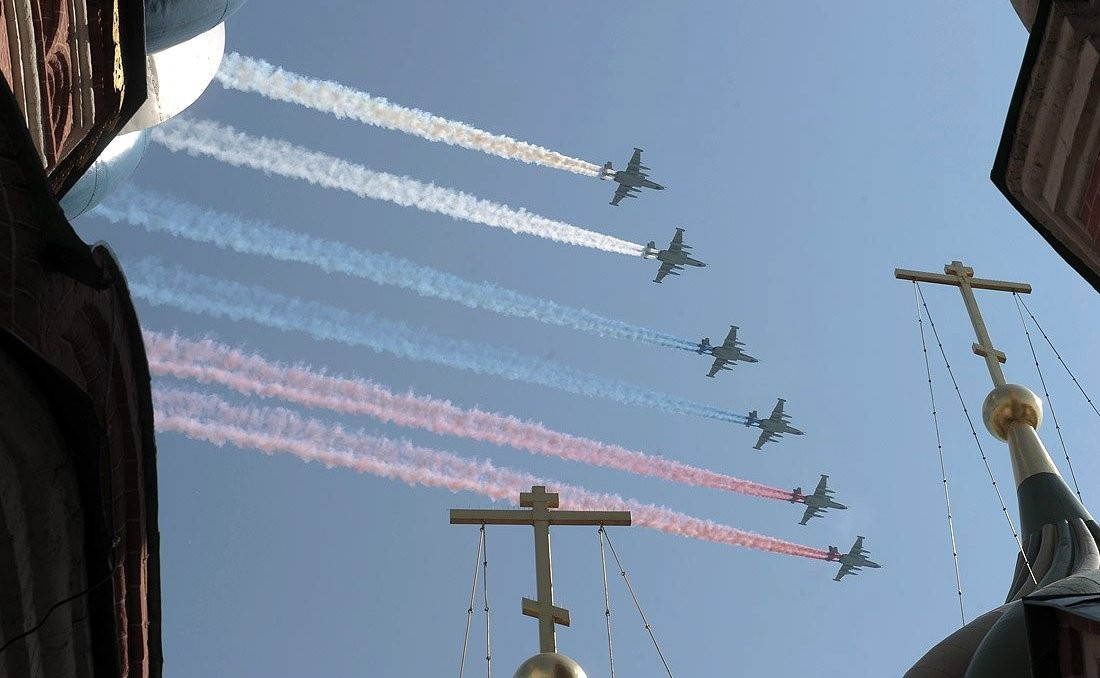
Russian flag presented by Su-25s

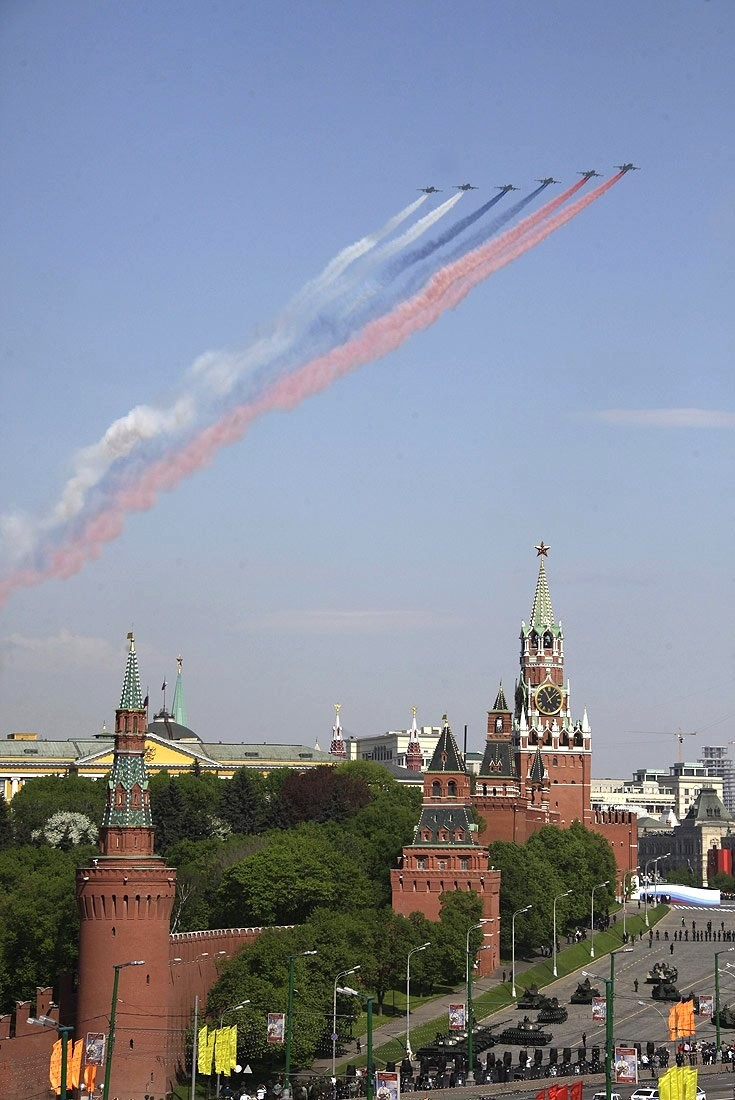
The sky over the Moscow Kremlin

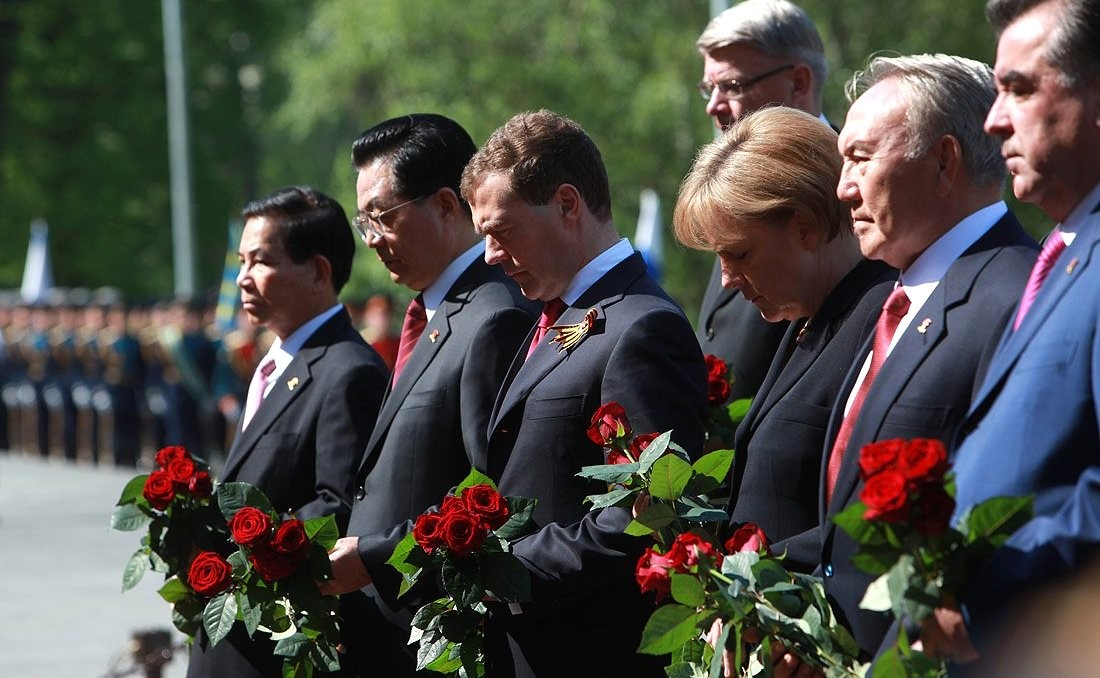
State leaders during the ceremony of laying wreaths to the Tomb of the Unknown Soldier

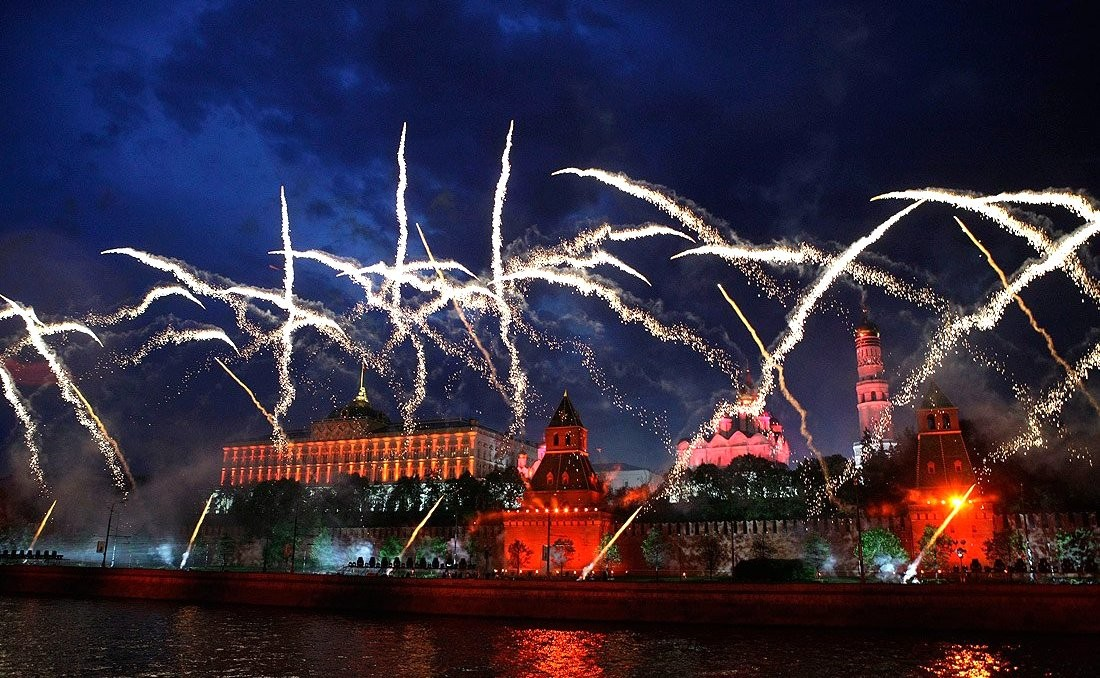
Fireworks at the Moscow Kremlin on the night of 9 May

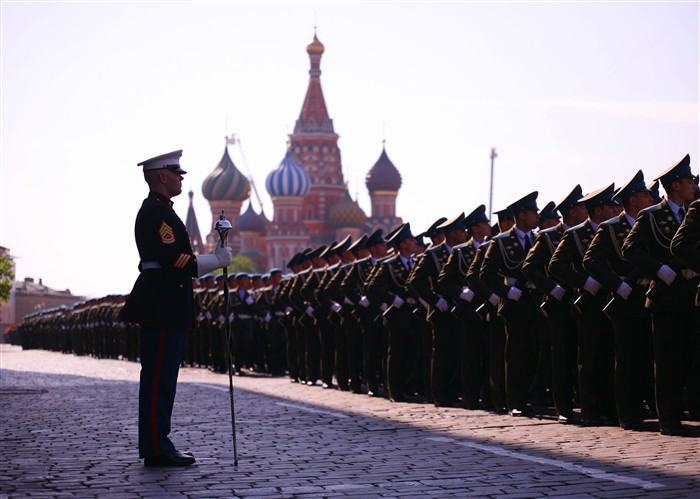
Marine Corps Gunnery Sgt. Benjamin Becker, Drum Major for U.S. Naval Forces Europe Band, stands in Red Square while waiting to perform at the parade.

== See also ==
- 2010 Minsk Victory Day Parade
- 2010 Kyiv Victory Day Parade
- Moscow Victory Parade of 1945
- Victory Day (9 May)
- Victory Day Parades
