= Ivan Kondov =

Bulgarian politician (born 1968)

- Иван Кондов
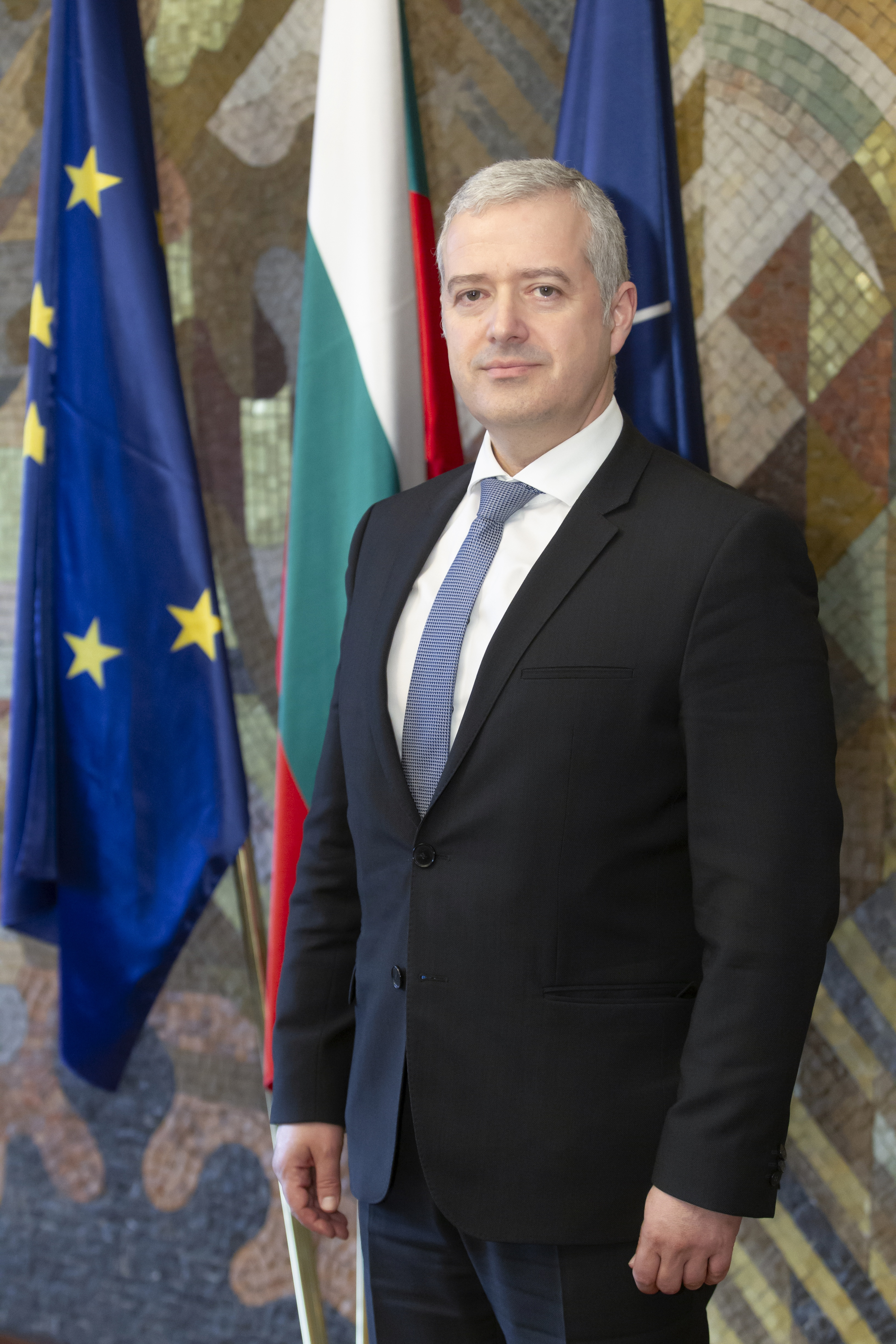
- Official portrait, 2023

Minister of Foreign Affairs
- In office 27 August 2024 – 16 January 2025
- Prime Minister: Dimitar Glavchev
- Preceded by: Dimitar Glavchev
- Succeeded by: Georg Georgiev
- In office 3 May 2023 – 6 June 2023
- Prime Minister: Galab Donev
- Preceded by: Nikolay Milkov
- Succeeded by: Mariya Gabriel

Personal details
- Born: 10 August 1968 (age 58) PR Bulgaria
- Party: Independent
- Education: University of National and World Economy
- Occupation: Politician; diplomat

Ivan Kondov (Bulgarian: Иван Кондов) is a Bulgarian politician and diplomat who served as Minister of Foreign Affairs from August 2024 to January 2025 and briefly in 2023. A political independent, he previously served as Permanent Secretary of the Ministry of Foreign Affairs from 2021 to 2023 and Bulgarian Ambassador to Spain from 2017 to 2021.

== Early life ==
Kondov was born on 10 August 1968. In 1994 he graduated from the University of National and World Economy with a degree in international relations, later also acquiring courses in international relations at the Diplomatic School of Spain and the Center for Security Policy Studies. He started working in international relations in 1995, a year after graduating, as an expert in the Ministry of Foreign Affairs. He then worked in political affairs at the Embassy of Bulgaria, London, and afterward worked as an expert and member of the delegation of Bulgaria to NATO from 2001 to 2007.

== Career ==
Starting in 2017, he was the Bulgarian Ambassador to Spain. During his ambassadorship, he worked to represent Bulgaria in the country when it had the presidency of the Council of the European Union. He left Madrid in mid-December and officially announced his departure in January 2021.

== Views ==
Kondov has been a supporter of Ukraine during the Russian invasion of Ukraine, saying that NATO will be secure when Ukraine becomes a full member of the organization as it would strengthen NATO's eastern flank, specifically in the Black Sea.

== Personal life ==
He speaks fluently in other languages like Spanish, English, French, and Italian, and sometimes uses Russian and Portuguese.

Political offices
| Preceded by Nikolay Milkov | Minister of Foreign Affairs of Bulgaria; 2023 | Succeeded by Mariya Gabriel |
| Preceded by Dimitar Glavchev | Minister of Foreign Affairs of Bulgaria; 2024–2025 | Succeeded by Georg Georgiev |
