= Georg Georgiev =

Bulgarian politician (born 1991)

- Георг Георгиев
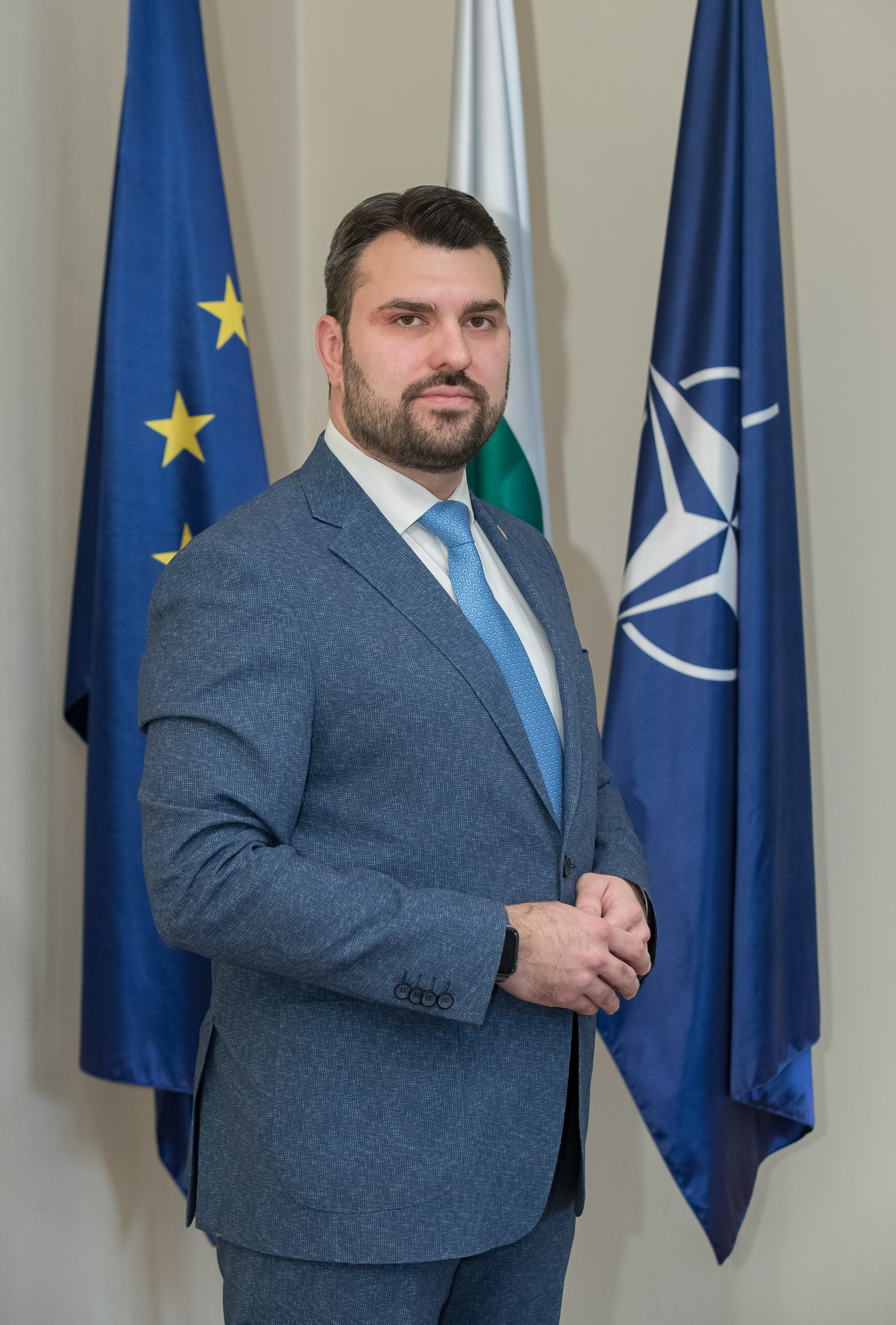
- Official portrait, 2025

Minister of Foreign Affairs
- In office 16 January 2025 – 19 February 2026
- Prime Minister: Rosen Zhelyazkov
- Preceded by: Ivan Kondov
- Succeeded by: Nadezhda Neynsky

Member of the National Assembly
- In office 19 October 2022 – 16 January 2025
- Constituency: 11th MMC – Lovech (2022–2023); 14th MMC – Pernik (2023–2025)
- In office 15 April 2021 – 21 July 2021
- Constituency: 24th MMC - Sofia
- In office 27 October 2014 – 19 April 2017
- Constituency: 24th MMC - Sofia

Personal details
- Born: Georg Danielov Georgiev; 20 October 1991 (age 34) Sofia, Bulgaria
- Party: GERB
- Spouse: Violeta Mancheva (m. 2022)
- Education: Sofia University (BA, MA)
- Occupation: Politician

Georg Danielov Georgiev (Bulgarian: Георг Даниелов Георгиев, born 20 October 1991) is a Bulgarian politician who served as Minister of Foreign Affairs from 2025 to 2026. A member of the GERB party, he previously served as Member of the National Assembly from 2014 to 2017, briefly in 2021 and from 2022 to 2025. Georgiev also served as Deputy Minister of Foreign Affairs from 2017 to 2021.

Political offices
Preceded by Ivan Kondov	Minister of Foreign Affairs of Bulgaria; 2025–2026	Succeeded by Nadezhda Neynsky
