= Teodora Genchovska =

Bulgarian politician

- Теодора Генчовска
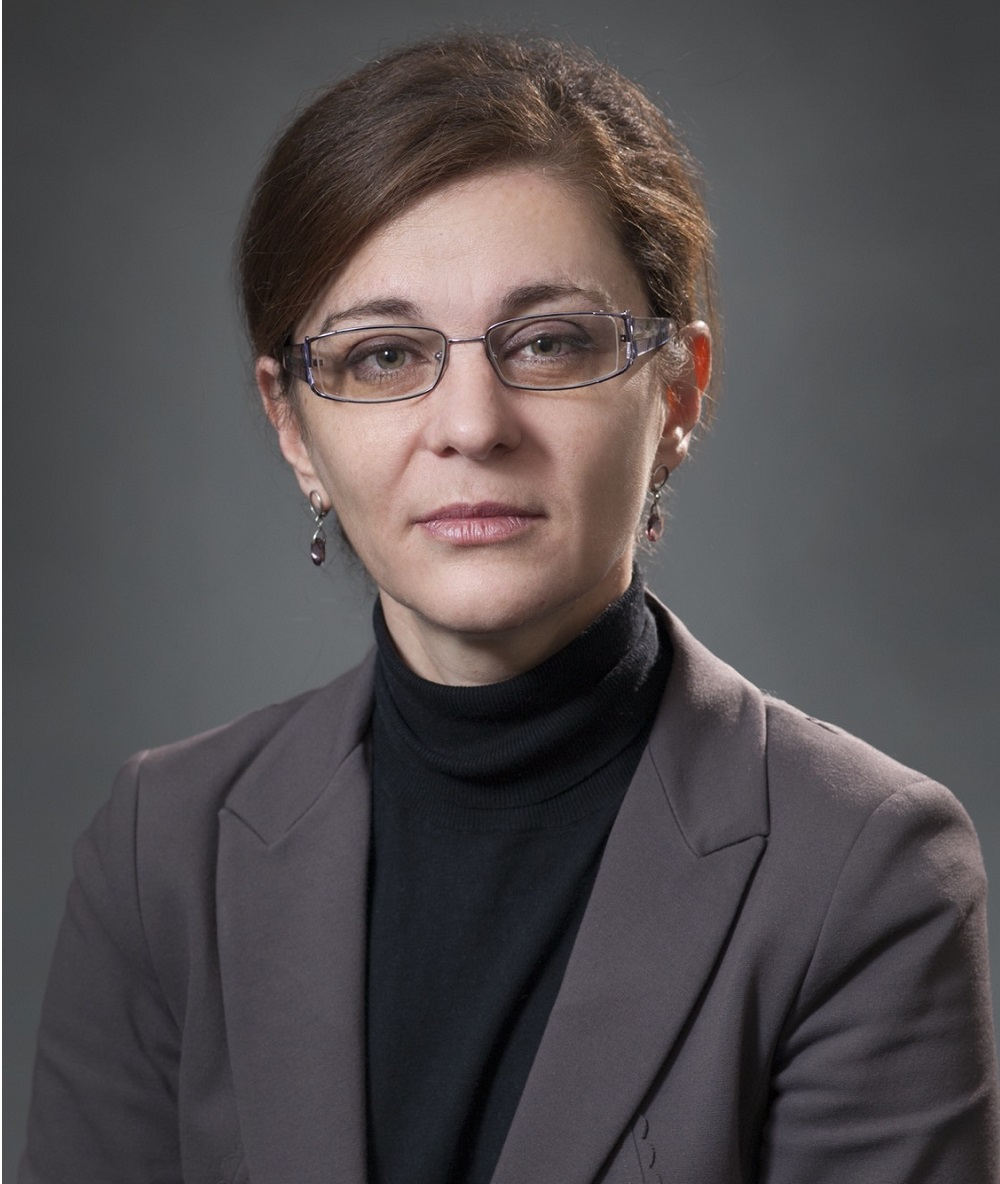
- Official portrait, 2021

Minister of Foreign Affairs
- In office 13 December 2021 – 2 August 2022
- Prime Minister: Kiril Petkov
- Preceded by: Svetlan Stoev
- Succeeded by: Nikolay Milkov

Personal details
- Born: Teodora Dimitrova Genchovska; 23 May 1971 (age 55) Pavlikeni, PR Bulgaria
- Party: ITN (since 2021)
- Education: Sofia University; Georgi Rakovski Military Academy
- Occupation: Politician; historian; military expert

Teodora Dimitrova Genchovska (Bulgarian: Теодора Димитрова Генчовска; born May 23, 1971) is a Bulgarian politician who served as the Minister of Foreign Affairs of Bulgaria from 2021 to 2022. A member of the ITN party, she later proceeded to serve as Deputy Minister of Defence from 2022 to 2023.

Political offices
Preceded by Svetlan Stoev	Minister of Foreign Affairs of Bulgaria; 2021–2022	Succeeded by Nikolay Milkov
