= Svetlan Stoev =

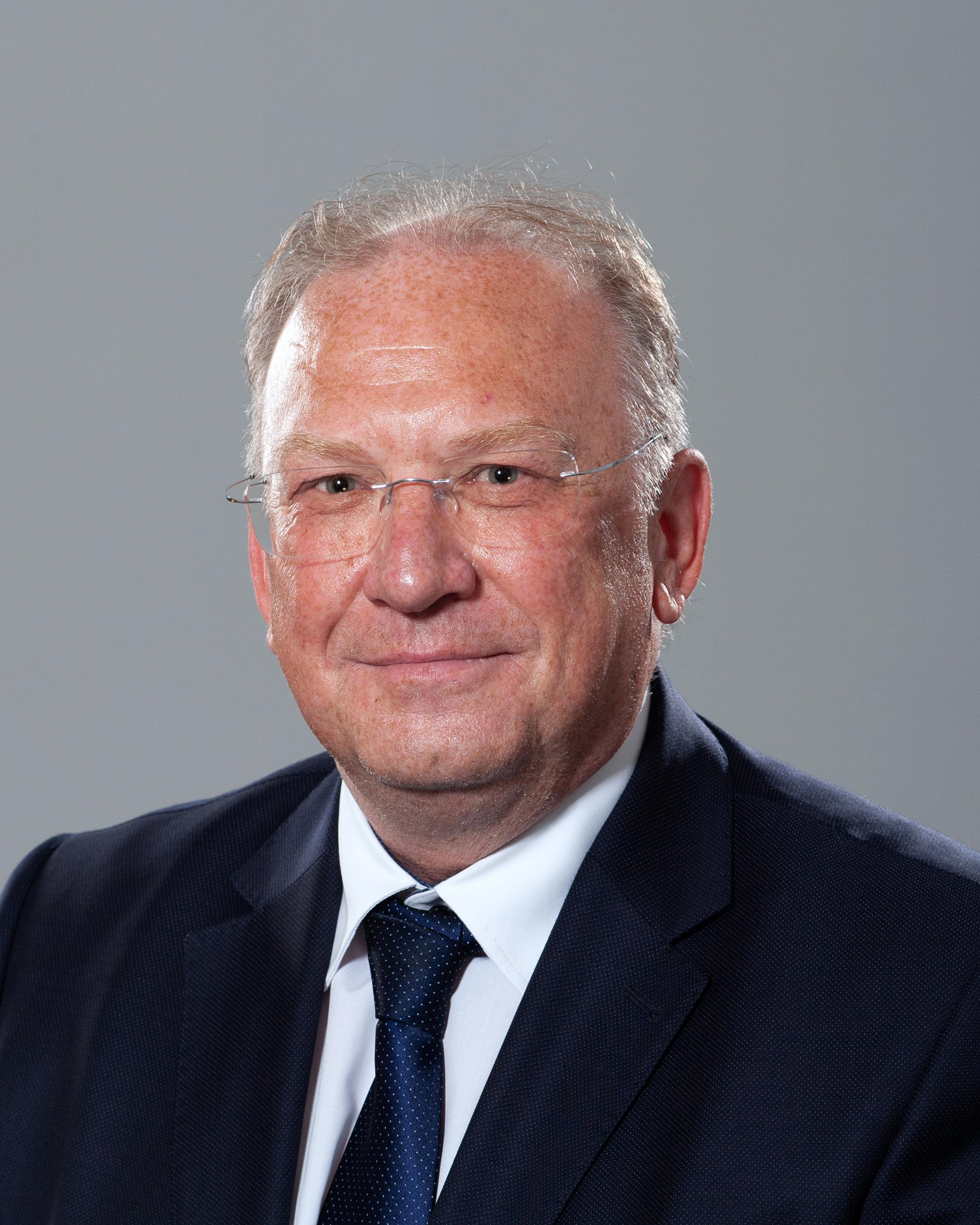
- Born: 30 August 1960 (age 65)
- Occupations: diplomat, Minister of Foreign Affairs of Bulgaria

Svetlan Stoev (born 30 August 1960) is a Bulgarian diplomat. Between May and December 2021, he was the Minister of Foreign Affairs in the interim government of Stefan Yanev.

== Biography ==
Svetlan Stoev was born on 30 August 1960 in Sofia. In 1985, he graduated with a degree in "International Relations" at the University of National and World Economy (UNSE). Later, he obtained a master's degree, as well as specializations in international economic relations (in Moscow in 1990-1992) and "European institutions and policies" at the Diplomatic Academy "Gustav Stresemann" (In Bonn in 1998).

Until 1987, he was a trainee attache in the "Printing" department. From 1987 to 1990, he was an attaché in the "Unified State Protocol" Directorate. Between 1992 and 1993 he was the Referent for Turkey in the "International Law and Consular Relations" department, then until 1997 he was the First Secretary at the Embassy of Bulgaria in Lagos, Nigeria . From 1997 to 1999, he held the position of Head of Sector "Scandinavian Countries" in the Directorate "Western Europe and North America".

From 1999 to 2002 he was a counselor at the Embassy of Bulgaria in Copenhagen, Denmark. In the following years, he was the Head of Department in the Directorate "European Countries" and chairman of the Bulgarian side of the Mixed Governmental Commission "Bulgaria - Bavaria". From 2005 to 2009 he was the ambassador, head of the Diplomatic Bureau of Bulgaria in Bonn, Germany, then until 2011 he was the Administrative Secretary of the Ministry of Foreign Affairs and chairman of the Interdepartmental Commission for Property Abroad. In the period 2012-2016, he was the extraordinary and plenipotentiary ambassador of Bulgaria in Sweden . From 2016 to 2018, he was the Director of the State Protocol Directorate at the Ministry of Foreign Affairs, and from January 2019 to May 2021, he was the Ambassador Extraordinary and Plenipotentiary of Bulgaria to Denmark.

As well as his native Bulgarian, he speaks English, German and Russian.

Political offices
Preceded by Ekaterina Zaharieva	Minister of Foreign Affairs of Bulgaria; 2021	Succeeded by Teodora Genchovska
