= Minister of Foreign Affairs (Bulgaria) =

Head of the Ministry of Foreign Affairs of Bulgaria

- Министър на външните работи
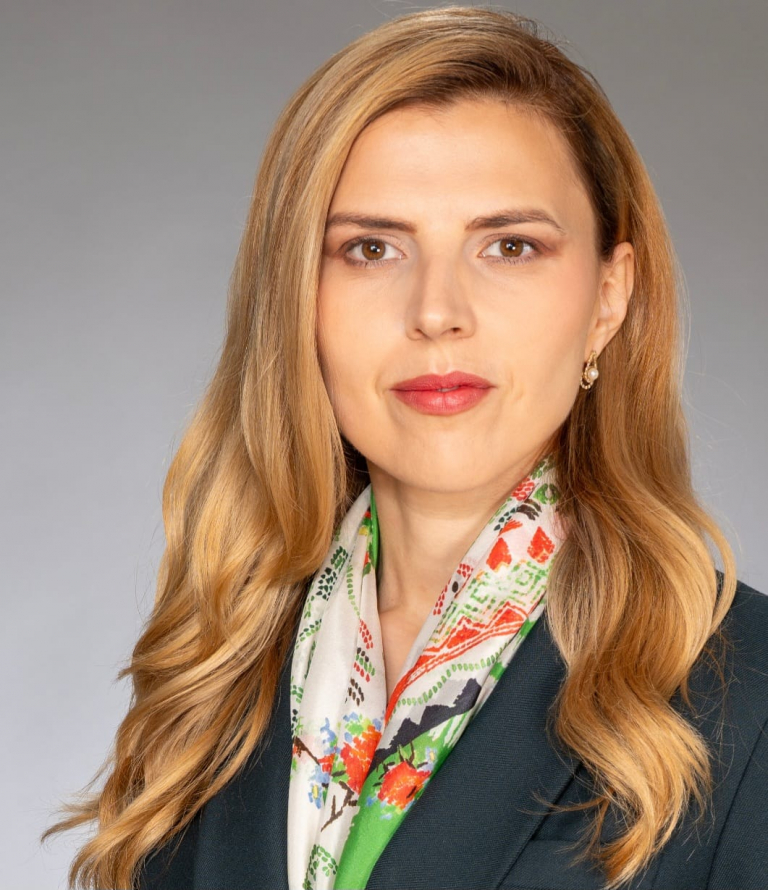
- Incumbent; Velislava Petrova-Chamova since 8 May 2026
- Ministry of Foreign Affairs
- Formation: 17 July 1879
- First holder: Marko Balabanov
- Website: mfa.bg/minister

The Minister of Foreign Affairs of Bulgaria (Bulgarian: Министър на външните работи) is the head of the Ministry of Foreign Affairs and a member of the Government of Bulgaria. The current officeholder is Velislava Petrova-Chamova.

== Functions ==
In accordance with the Regulations of the Ministry of Foreign Affairs, the minister directs, coordinates and controls the implementation of the state policy of Bulgaria in its relations with other countries, ensuring the maintenance and development of foreign policy dialogue, security policy and bilateral, regional and multilateral cooperation. The minister carries his/her duties by interacting with the state institutions in the implementation of their powers in the field of foreign policy and their international responsibilities; coordinating and participating in the preparation and conducting of the visits of state officials and government delegations at the highest level in Bulgaria and abroad; coordinating the international cooperation carried out by other ministers and heads of departments; proposing drafts of normative acts to the Council of Ministers, etc.

== List of ministers ==
No.	Name (Birth–Death)	Portrait	Took office	Left office	Political party
Ministers of Foreign Affairs and Religious Denominations (1879–1947)
1	Marko Balabanov (1837–1921)		17 July 1879	6 December 1879	Conservative Party
2	Grigor Nachovich (1845–1920)		6 December 1879	7 April 1880	Conservative Party
3	Dragan Tsankov (1828–1911)		7 April 1880	10 December 1880	Liberal Party
4	Nikola Stoichev (1845–1898)		10 December 1880	9 May 1881	Liberal Party
	Nikola Stoichev (1845–1898)		9 May 1881	13 July 1881	Conservative Party
5	Konstantin Stoilov (1853–1901)		13 July 1881	11 August 1881	Conservative Party
6	Georgi Valkovich (1833–1892)		11 August 1881	26 January 1883	Conservative Party
(5)	Konstantin Stoilov (1853–1901) (2nd time)		26 January 1883	15 March 1883	Conservative Party
7	Kiryak Tsankov (1847–1903)		15 March 1883	19 September 1883	Independent
(1)	Marko Balabanov (1837–1921) (2nd time)		19 September 1883	11 July 1884	Progressive Liberal Party
8	Iliya Tsanov (1835–1901)		11 July 1884	21 August 1886	Liberal Party
9	Hristo Stoyanov (1842/1845–1895)		21 August 1886	24 August 1886	Independent
(5)	Konstantin Stoilov (1853–1901) (3rd time)		24 August 1886	28 August 1886	Conservative Party
(2)	Grigor Nachovich (1845–1920) (2nd time)		28 August 1886	1 September 1887	Conservative Party
10	Georgi Stranski (1847–1904)		1 September 1887	16 June 1890	People's Liberal Party
11	Stefan Stambolov (1854–1895)		16 June 1890	14 November 1890	People's Liberal Party
12	Dimitar Grekov (1847–1901)		14 November 1890	31 May 1894	People's Liberal Party
(2)	Grigor Nachovich (1845–1920) (3rd time)		31 May 1894	22 February 1896	People's Party
(5)	Konstantin Stoilov (1853–1901) (4th time)		22 February 1896	30 January 1899	People's Party
(12)	Dimitar Grekov (1847–1901) (2nd time)		30 January 1899	13 October 1899	People's Liberal Party
13	Todor Ivanchov (1858–1906)		13 October 1899	10 December 1900	Liberal Party (Radoslavists)
14	Dimitar Tonchev (1858–1906)		10 December 1900	21 January 1901	Liberal Party (Radoslavists)
15	Racho Petrov (1861–1942)		21 January 1901	4 March 1901	Independent
16	Stoyan Danev (1858–1949)		4 March 1901	18 May 1903	Progressive Liberal Party
(15)	Racho Petrov (1861–1942) (2nd time)		18 May 1903	4 November 1906	Independent
17	Dimitar Stanchov (1863–1940)		4 November 1906	29 January 1908	Independent
18	Stefan Paprikov (1858–1920)		29 January 1908	18 September 1910	Democratic Party
19	Aleksandar Malinov (1867–1938)		18 September 1910	29 March 1911	Democratic Party
20	Ivan Evstratiev Geshov (1849–1924)		29 March 1911	14 June 1913	People's Party
(16)	Stoyan Danev (1858–1949) (2nd time)		14 June 1913	17 July 1913	Progressive Liberal Party
21	Nikola Genadiev (1868–1923)		17 July 1913	30 December 1913	People's Liberal Party
22	Vasil Radoslavov (1854–1929)		30 December 1913	21 June 1918	Liberal Party (Radoslavists)
(19)	Aleksandar Malinov (1867–1938) (2nd time)		21 June 1918	17 October 1918	Democratic Party
23	Teodor Teodorov (1859–1924)		17 October 1918	6 October 1919	People's Party
24	Mihail Madzharov (1854–1944)		6 October 1919	16 April 1920	People's Party
25	Aleksandar Stamboliyski (1879–1923)		16 April 1920	9 June 1923	Bulgarian Agrarian National Union
26	Aleksandar Tsankov (1879–1959)		9 June 1923	10 June 1923	Democratic Alliance
27	Hristo Kalfov (1883–1945)		10 June 1923	4 January 1926	Democratic Alliance
28	Atanas Burov (1875–1954)		4 January 1926	29 June 1931	Democratic Alliance
(19)	Aleksandar Malinov (1867–1938) (3rd time)		29 June 1931	29 October 1931	Democratic Party
29	Nikola Mushanov (1872–1951)		29 October 1931	19 May 1934	Democratic Party
30	Kimon Georgiev (1882–1969)		19 May 1934	23 May 1934	Zveno
31	Konstantin Batolov (1878–1938)		23 May 1934	21 April 1935	Independent
32	Georgi Kyoseivanov (1884–1960)		21 April 1935	15 February 1940	Independent
33	Ivan Popov (1890–1944)		15 February 1940	11 April 1942	Independent
34	Bogdan Filov (1883–1945)		11 April 1942	14 September 1943	Independent
35	Sava Kirov (1893–1972)		14 September 1943	14 October 1943	Independent
36	Dimitar Shishmanov (1889–1945)		14 October 1943	1 June 1944	Independent
37	Ivan Bagryanov (1891–1945)		1 June 1944	12 June 1944	Independent
38	Parvan Draganov (1890–1945)		12 June 1944	2 September 1944	Independent
39	Konstantin Muraviev (1893–1965)		2 September 1944	9 September 1944	Bulgarian Agrarian National Union
40	Petko Staynov (1890–1972)		9 September 1944	31 March 1946	Independent
41	Georgi Kulishev (1885–1974)		31 March 1946	22 November 1946	Independent
(30)	Kimon Georgiev (1882–1969) (2nd time)		22 November 1946	11 December 1947	Zveno
Ministers of Foreign Affairs (1947–present)
42	Vasil Kolarov (1877–1950)		11 December 1947	6 August 1949	Bulgarian Communist Party
43	Vladimir Poptomov (1890–1952)		6 August 1949	27 May 1950	Bulgarian Communist Party
44	Mincho Neychev (1887–1956)		27 May 1950	11 August 1956	Bulgarian Communist Party
45	Karlo Lukanov (1897–1982)		11 August 1956	27 November 1962	Bulgarian Communist Party
46	Ivan Hristov Bashev (1916–1971)		27 November 1962	13 December 1971	Bulgarian Communist Party
47	Petar Mladenov (1936–2000)		13 December 1971	17 November 1989	Bulgarian Communist Party
48	Boyko Dimitrov (1941–2025)		17 November 1989	22 September 1990	Bulgarian Communist Party
49	Lyuben Gotsev (1930–2020)		22 September 1990	20 December 1990	Bulgarian Socialist Party
50	Viktor Valkov (born 1936)		20 December 1990	8 November 1991	Bulgarian Agrarian; National Union
51	Stoyan Ganev (1955–2013)		8 November 1991	30 December 1992	Union of Democratic Forces
52	Lyuben Berov (1925–2006)		30 December 1992	23 June 1993	Independent
53	Stanislav Daskalov (born 1952)		23 June 1993	17 October 1994	Independent
54	Ivan Stanchov (1929–2021)		17 October 1994	26 January 1995	Independent
55	Georgi Pirinski Jr. (born 1948)		26 January 1995	14 November 1996	Bulgarian Socialist Party
(–)	Irina Bokova (born 1952) (acting)		14 November 1996	12 February 1997	Bulgarian Socialist Party
56	Stoyan Stalev (born 1952)		12 February 1997	21 May 1997	Independent
57	Nadezhda Mihaylova (born 1962)		21 May 1997	24 July 2001	Union of Democratic Forces
58	Solomon Passy (born 1956)		24 July 2001	17 August 2005	National Movement Simeon II
59	Ivaylo Kalfin (born 1964)		17 August 2005	27 July 2009	Bulgarian Socialist Party
60	Rumiana Jeleva (born 1969)		27 July 2009	27 January 2010	GERB
61	Nickolay Mladenov (born 1972)		27 January 2010	13 March 2013	GERB
62	Marin Raykov (born 1960)		13 March 2013	29 May 2013	Independent
63	Kristian Vigenin (born 1975)		29 May 2013	6 August 2014	Bulgarian Socialist Party
64	Daniel Mitov (born 1977)		6 August 2014	27 January 2017	Independent
65	Radi Naydenov (born 1962)		27 January 2017	4 May 2017	Independent
66	Ekaterina Zaharieva (born 1975)		4 May 2017	12 May 2021	GERB
67	Svetlan Stoev (born 1962)		12 May 2021	13 December 2021	Independent
68	Teodora Genchovska (born 1971)		13 December 2021	2 August 2022	There Are Such People
69	Nikolay Milkov (born 1957)		2 August 2022	3 May 2023	Independent
70	Ivan Kondov (born 1968)		3 May 2023	6 June 2023	Independent
71	Mariya Gabriel (born 1979)		6 June 2023	9 April 2024	GERB
72	Stefan Dimitrov (born 1966)		9 April 2024	22 April 2024	Independent
73	Dimitar Glavchev (born 1963)		22 April 2024	27 August 2024	Independent
(70)	Ivan Kondov (born 1968)		27 August 2024	16 January 2025	Independent
74	Georg Georgiev (born 1991)		16 January 2025	19 February 2026	GERB
(57)	Nadezhda Neynsky (born 1962) (2nd time)		19 February 2026	8 May 2026	Independent
75	Velislava Petrova-Chamova (born 1990)		8 May 2026	Incumbent	Progressive Bulgaria
