= Nikolay Milkov =

Bulgarian diplomat and politician

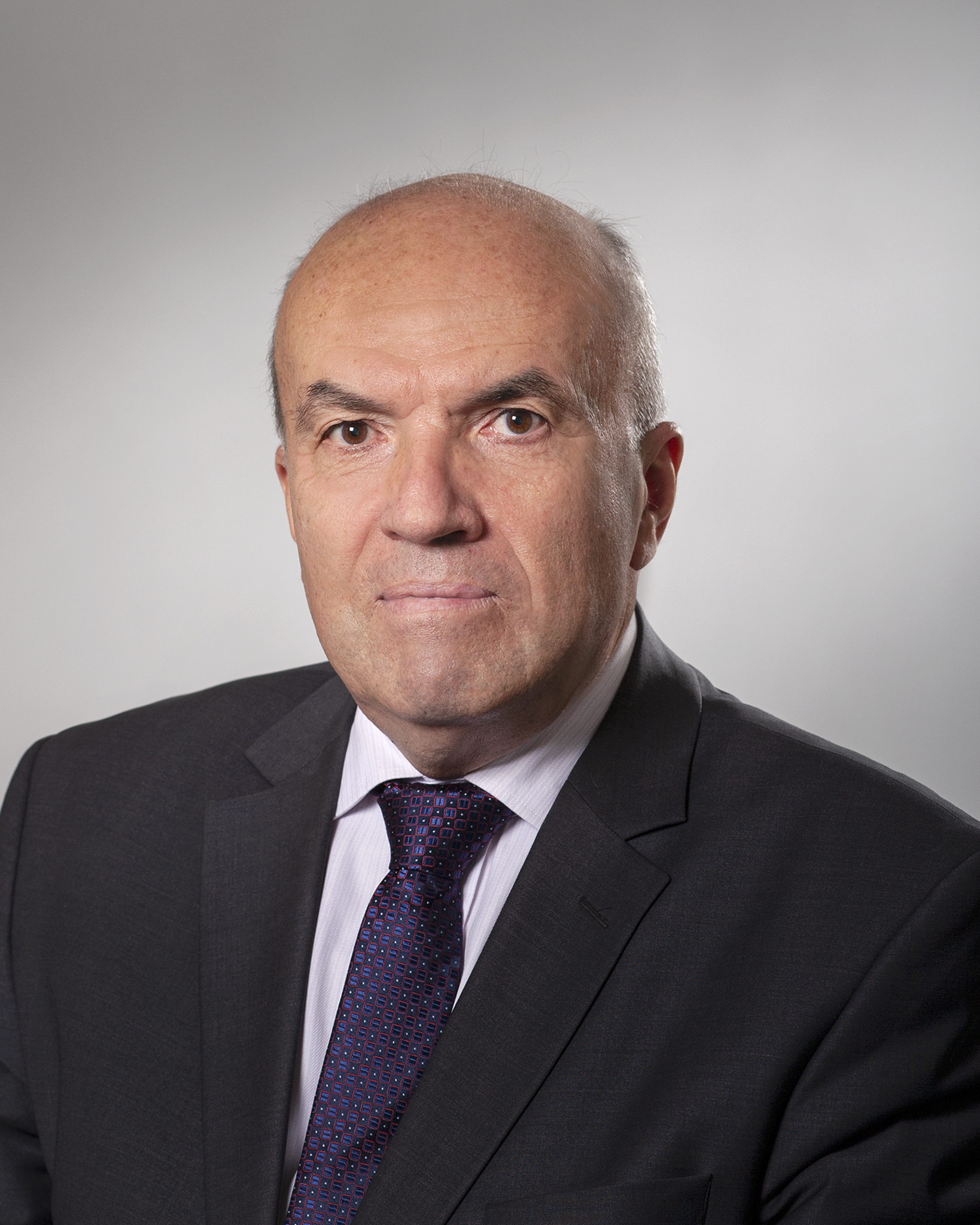
- Nikolay Milkov

Minister of Foreign Affairs
- In office 2 August 2022 – 3 May 2023
- Prime Minister: Galab Donev
- Preceded by: Teodora Genchovska
- Succeeded by: Ivan Kondov

Personal details
- Born: 10 December 1957 (age 68) Sofia, Bulgaria
- Party: Non-partisan
- Profession: Diplomat, politician
- Known for: Former Minister of Foreign Affairs; Ambassador to France, Canada, and Romania

Nikolay Milkov (born 10 December 1957) is a Bulgarian diplomat and politician who served as the Minister of Foreign Affairs from 2 August 2022 to 3 May 2023. Prior to his appointment, he was the Bulgarian Ambassador to France. He had also served as the Ambassador to Canada and Romania.

Political offices
Preceded by Teodora Genchovska	Minister of Foreign Affairs of Bulgaria; 2022–2023	Succeeded by Ivan Kondov
