= Paneuropean Working Group =

Organization in the European Parliament

The Paneuropean Working Group in the European Parliament was established in 1985 by Otto von Habsburg. It aims at bringing Members of the European Parliament together, who follow the vision and principles of Richard von Coudenhove-Kalergi. Already after the end of the First World War, he formulated his thoughts about a common Europe in freedom, rule of law and peace.

Since 2009, the Austrian Member of the European Parliament, Paul Rübig is the elected President of the Working Group, after he had served already several years as Vice-President. Previous presidents were Nicolas Estgen, Leo Tindemans (1994-1999) and Ingo Friedrich (1999–2009).

== Activities ==
Once a month, every Tuesday during the Strasbourg plenary week of the European Parliament, the Working Group invites high-ranking personalities from politics, business, religions and culture into the European Parliament. The group wants to encourage networking between the Members of the European Parliament, in order to establish open debates and to find common solutions for the problems of a common in a globalized world. Additionally, the group also organizes also events in Brussels.

Past Events
Date	Speaker	Function	Topic
16 April 2013	Nikola Poposki	Foreign Minister of the Republic of Macedonia	State of Play and Prospects in the EU accession process of Macedonia
12 March 2013	Enver Hoxhaj	Foreign Minister of the Republic of Kosovo	Kosovo, five years of statehood: Success stories and challenges
26 February 2013	Jan Tombiński	Head of the EU Delegation in Ukraine	2013 - Decision year of Ukraine
5 February 2013	Hans-Gert Pöttering, Arnaud Danjean, Alain Terrenoire	Current and former Members of the European Parliament	50 years of Elysée Treaty: The French-German friendship as driving force for Europe?
15 January 2013	Samir Khalil Samir	Professor for Christian-oriental theology and Islamism in Beirut, Paris, Rom	Where is the Arab Spring? What could be the European contribution?
11 December 2012	Walter Spindler	Deputy Commander of Eurocorps	Eurocorps - 50 years after the Elysée Treaty
20 November 2012	Peter Turkson	President of the Pontifical Council for Justice and Peace	Freedom of religion and the discrimination and persecution of Christians
11 September 2012	Jean-Claude Mignon	President of the Parliamentary Assembly of the Council of Europe	The European Parliament and the Parliamentary Assembly of the Council of Europe
3 July 2012	Franjo Komarica	Bishop of Banja Luka	The political situation of Bosnia-Herzegovina
