= Nadezhda Neynsky =

Bulgarian politician and diplomat (1962)

- Надежда Нейнски
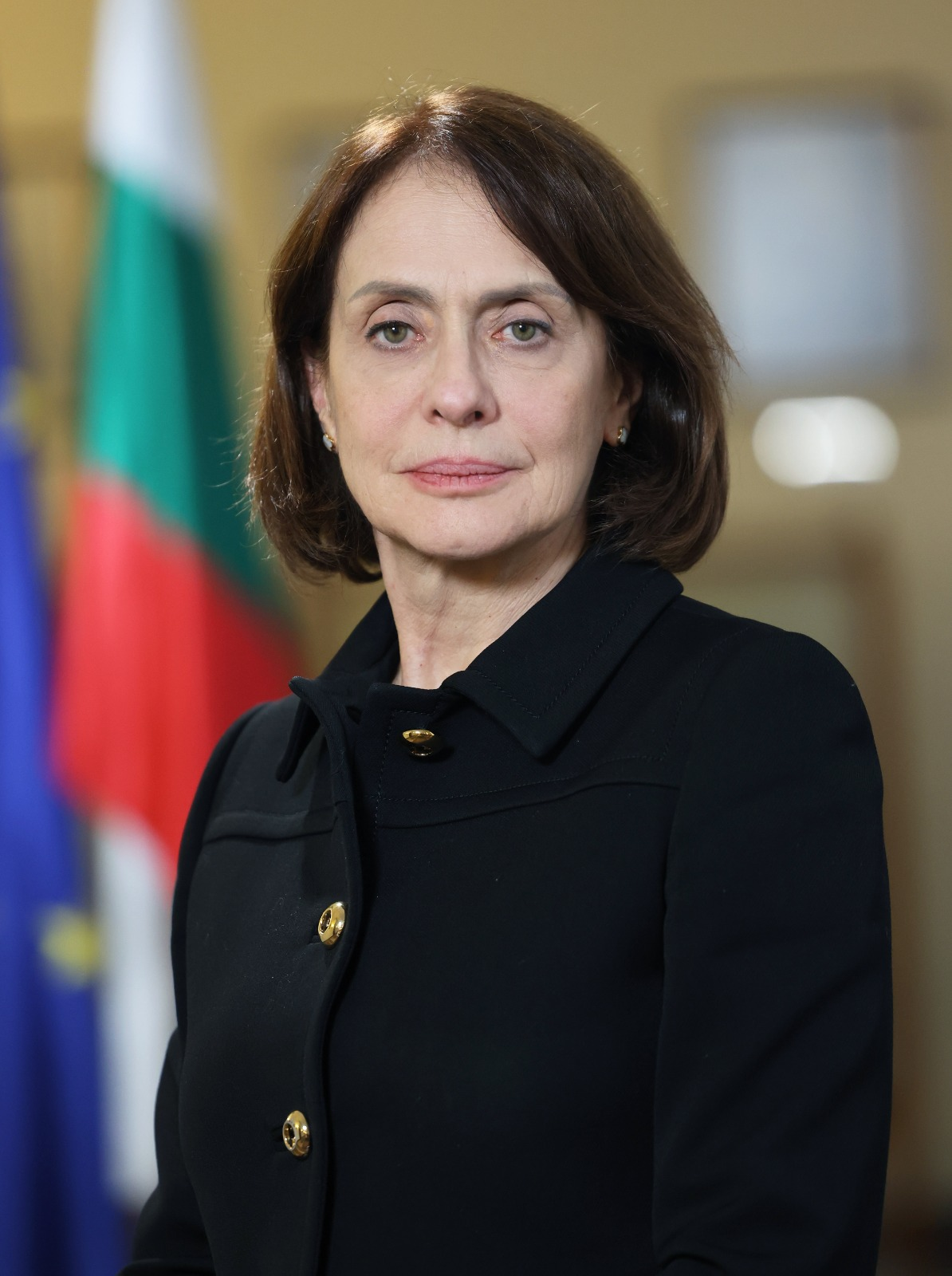
- Official portrait, 2026

Minister of Foreign Affairs
- In office 19 February 2026 – 8 May 2026
- Prime Minister: Andrey Gyurov
- Preceded by: Georg Georgiev
- Succeeded by: Velislava Petrova-Chamova
- In office 21 May 1997 – 24 July 2001
- Prime Minister: Ivan Kostov
- Preceded by: Stoyan Stalev
- Succeeded by: Solomon Passy

Member of the European Parliament for Bulgaria
- In office 14 July 2009 – 30 June 2014
- Preceded by: Desislav Chukolov
- Succeeded by: Svetoslav Malinov

Leader of the Union of Democratic Forces
- In office 10 March 2002 – 1 October 2005
- Preceded by: Ekaterina Mihaylova
- Succeeded by: Petar Stoyanov

Member of the National Assembly
- In office 5 July 2001 – 25 June 2009
- Constituency: 3rd MMC - Varna (2001-2005); 25th MMC - Sofia (2005-2009)
- In office 12 January 1995 – 21 May 1997
- Constituency: 3rd MMC - Varna

Personal details
- Born: 9 August 1962 (age 64) Sofia, PR Bulgaria
- Party: Independent
- Other political affiliations: Union of Democratic Forces (until 2012)
- Spouses: Kamen Mihaylov (m. 1983; div. 2006) Svetlin Neynski (m. 2009)
- Children: 2
- Education: Lycée Français de Sofia
- Alma mater: Sofia University
- Occupation: Politician; diplomat

Nadezhda Nikolova Neynsky (Bulgarian: Надежда Николова Нейнски, born August 9, 1962) is a Bulgarian politician and diplomat who served as Minister of Foreign Affairs from 1997 to 2001 and briefly in 2026. Neynsky was also a Member of the European Parliament from 2009 to 2014 and led the SDS party from 2002 to 2005.

Representing the SDS party, Neynsky served as Member of the National Assembly from 2001 to 2009 and from 1995 to 1997. Her political career also included an unsuccessful run for Mayor of Sofia in 2003. As diplomat, Neynsky served as Bulgaria’s Ambassador to Turkey from 2015 to 2021.

== Early life and education ==
In 1977, Mihaylova completed her primary education at the 127th "Ivan Denkoglu" school in Sofia and in 1981 graduated from the Lycée Français de Sofia. Mihaylova subsequently enrolled as a student of philology at Sofia University, completing her studies in 1985. Between 1986 and 1988, she worked as a freelance journalist. In that period Mihaylova became a member of the Union of Translators in Bulgaria (Bulgarian: Съюз на преводачите в България).

== Career ==
=== Member of the Bulgarian National Assembly and Foreign Minister of Bulgaria ===
Nadezhda Mihaylova was a member of the Union of Democratic Forces (SDS) until she left in November 2012 after 21 years of membership in the party.

She was elected to sit the 37th National Assembly (1995–1997). During this time she sat on the Foreign Affairs Committee and was member of the Bulgarian delegation to the Council of Europe. She was also chairman of the Committee for Parliamentary and Public Relations Assembly (1994–1997) and the vice-president of the Union of Democratic Forces.

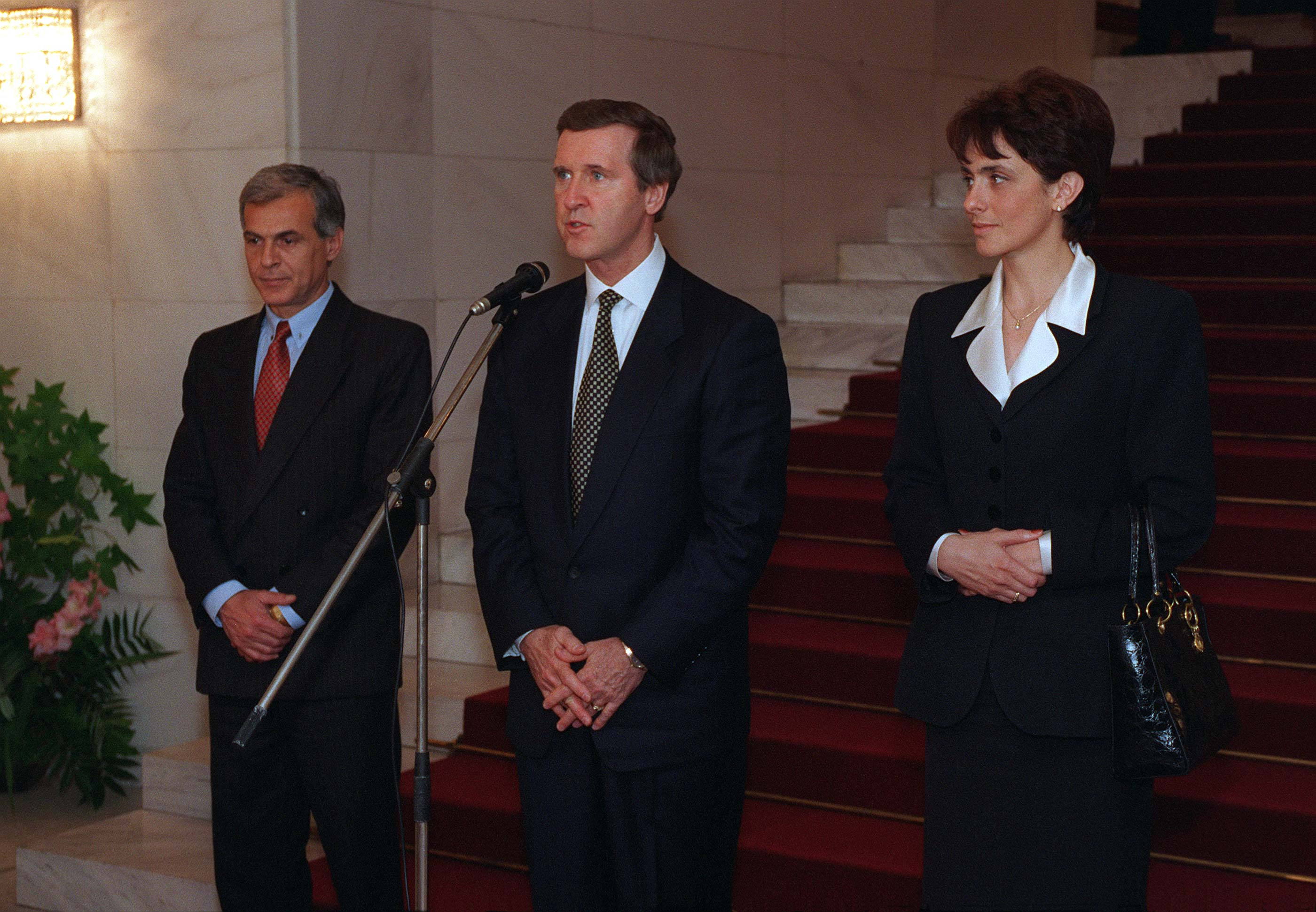
Bulgarian Minister of Defense Georgi Ananiev (left) with US Secretary of Defense William Cohen (centre) and Bulgarian Foreign Minister Nadezhda Mihailova (right) in Sofia, Bulgaria, in 1997.

She was reelected in 1997 and sat in the 38th National Assembly (1997–2001). She was appointed Minister of Foreign Affairs in Ivan Kostov's government and held that post for four years. As Minister of Foreign Affairs, she strongly supported a policy of NATO integration and EU membership of her country.

In February 1999, she was chosen as the deputy chairman of the European People's Party at the 13th Congress in Brussels, becoming the first person from Eastern Europe to hold this position.

In March 2000, as the Bulgarian Foreign Minister, Mihaylova denied having delivered a document showing an alleged plan of former Serbian president Slobodan Milosevic aimed at ethnic cleansing of Kosovo (Operation Horseshoe) to the then foreign minister of Germany, Joschka Fischer, in April 1999. In 2012, however, Mihaylova finally admitted to private Bulgarian channel BTV that she had handed the document regarding the Operation Horseshoe to the German foreign minister. During the 78-day NATO bombing of Yugoslavia, in April 1999, British Prime Minister Tony Blair travelled to Sofia praising Nadezhda Mihaylova commitment with the words: "You, Nadezhda, have become the symbol of the wider Europe – of a whole Europe – a Europe of solidarity."

As an MP in the 39th National Assembly (2001–2005), she was a member of the Foreign Affairs Committee and the Committee on National Security and Defence.

She was elected chairman of the United Democratic Forces in 2002. Mihaylova's tenure as UDF leader saw an unprecedented attrition of public support for her party which diminished UDF's political position to not much more than a marginal political player. Many blamed Mihaylova's leadership style for the downfall of her party. One of her most outspoken critics was Edvin Sugarev who in April 2003 accused the UDF leadership of lack of political strategy and political impotence. In protest, Sugarev resigned from his position in the party's National Executive Council.

In the 2003 local elections Mihaylova ran for the Mayor of Sofia. Mihaylova made a pledge to resign as the UDF chairwoman in case she loses the mayoral election. She lost, but reneged on her pledge and stayed on as the UDF leader.

After the disappointing local elections of 2003, a rift broke between her and the former PM Ivan Kostov in the party. In 2004, 29 UDF delegates (led by Kostov) left to form a new party, Democrats for a Strong Bulgaria. After the disappointing 2005 parliamentary election, with her party finishing fifth, she was succeeded by former president Petar Stoyanov as the chairman of the party. On 30 November 2005, Mihaylova established the "Right Alternative" (Bulgarian: Дясна алтернатива) faction within the party.

She served on the Foreign Affairs Committee and the Committee on European Integration as a member of the 40th National Assembly. (2005–2009). From 2008 to 2009, Nadezhda served as the vice-president of the Bulgarian National Assembly.

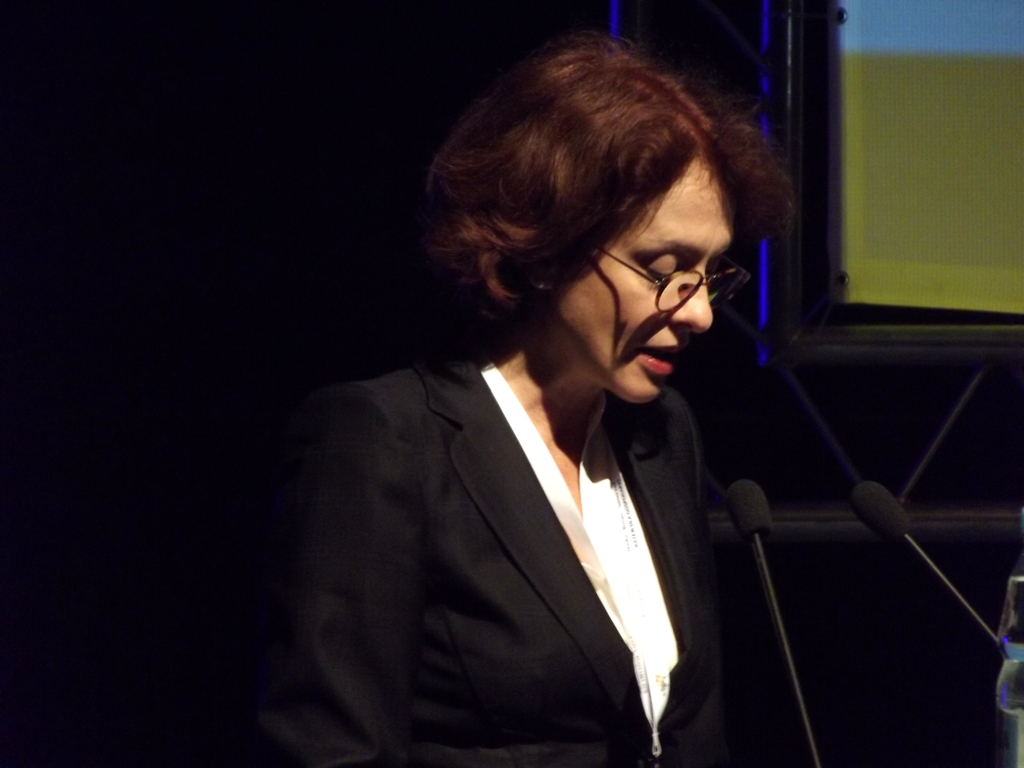
Nadezhda Neynsky in 2013

In November 2012, she quit the right-wing party after three senior MPs were expelled.

=== Member of the European Parliament ===
In the 2009 European parliamentary election Neynsky was elected as the SDS candidate. Since then she has been a member of the European People's Party (Bulgarian: Hristyandemokrati). As an MEP she sat on the Committee on Budgets and was the Co-Resident on Common Foreign and Security Policy (CFSP). She was also a member of the Delegation to the EU-Russia and a member of the Delegation for relations with the NATO Parliamentary Assembly. She served as a Deputy on the Committee on Foreign Affairs, a Deputy on the Subcommittee on Security and Defence, and a substitute member of the Delegation for relations with Maghreb countries and the Arab Maghreb Union.

In May 2012, she founded, together with the Austrian MEP Paul Rübig and the Danish MEP Bendt Bendtsen, a new organization called SME Europe. This pro-business organization within the European People's Party, aims at improving the situation of small and medium-sized enterprises all across Europe. Currently, she holds the position of President. She was vice-president of the Union of SMEs to the European People's Party from 2007 to 2011 and vice-president of the European People's Party.

=== Other fields of politics ===
Speaking in 2016 to a newspaper about a role model as a leader, she revealed her admiration for former US Secretary of State, Madeleine Albright.

Nadezhda Neynski was the Ambassador of Bulgaria to Turkey from 2015 to 2021.

=== Outside politics ===
She was chairman of the Board of the Association of Small and Medium Enterprises in Bulgaria in 2007. She was also a member of the Advisory Group of the Southern Leaders' Round Tables (SLRT) to the Special Branch Cooperation among Developing Countries (Special Unit for South-South Cooperation) in 2006. She is a member of the International Advisory Committee to the "Democracy Coalition Project", in partnership with the Foundation "Bertelsmann", organization "Freedom House" and the Ghana Centre for Democratic Development (2006). President of the Institute for Democracy and Stability in Southeast Europe (2004).

She became a member of the National Union of Civil Society UNITY of 8 December 2012.

== Awards ==
She received the Golden Plate award of the Academy of Achievement, Order of Denmark, first degree awarded Medal of the Republic of Malta, Venice Honour, Knight of the Legion of Honor, France Cross of the Order of public office by the King of Spain, awarded the Medal of tolerance organization B'nai B'rith.

Mihaylova was also chosen as the woman politician of the year in Bulgaria for 2008.

== Family ==
In 1983 Nadezhda married Kamen Mikhailov and they have two daughters - Violeta and Nina. In 2006, Nadezhda and Kamen divorced. On 3 October 2009, Nadezhda Mihaylova married Svetlin Neynski at the Embassy of Bulgaria in Madrid.

== See also ==
- Operation Horseshoe
- List of foreign ministers in 2001
- Foreign relations of Bulgaria
- List of Bulgarians

== Notes ==
Political offices
Preceded by Stoyan Stalev	Minister of Foreign Affairs of Bulgaria; 21 May 1997 – 24 July 2001	Succeeded by Solomon Passy
Preceded by Georg Georgiev	Minister of Foreign Affairs of Bulgaria; 19 February 2026 – 8 May 2026	Succeeded by Velislava Petrova-Chamova
