= Paul Rübig =

Austrian politician (born 1953)

Paul Rübig MEP
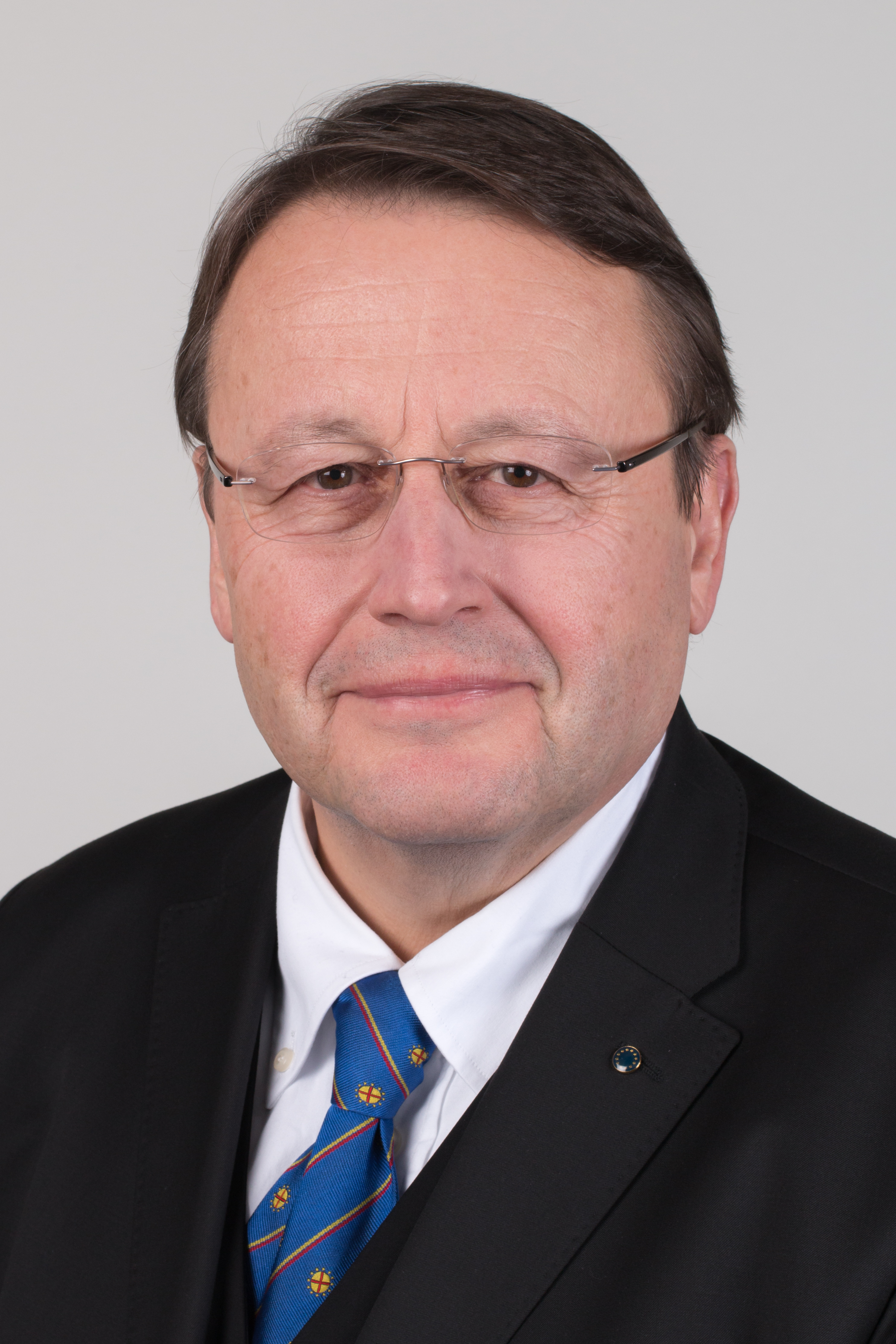

Member of the European Parliament
- In office 1 January 1996 – 2 July 2019
- Constituency: Austria

Personal details
- Born: 6 May 1953 (age 73) Wels, Austria
- Party: Austrian; Austrian People's Party; EU; European People's Party
- Education: Johannes-Kepler University, Linz
- Website: Official website

Paul Rübig (born 6 May 1953) is an Austrian politician who served as a Member of the European Parliament (MEP) from 1996 until 2019. He is a member of the Austrian People's Party, part of the European People's Party.

Rübig became a Member of the European Parliament on 25 January 1996, and was re-elected in 1996, 1999, 2004, 2009 and 2014.

== Background ==
Born in 1953, Rübig attended the polytechnic institute for farm machinery design in Steyr, graduating in 1972. After his military service, he studied business administration, marketing and industrial engineering at the University of Linz (1972–78). He completed his studies there with a doctorate at the Institute for Auditing, Trusteeship and Accountancy in 1984. At the same time, he worked as a lifeguard, glider and skiing instructor.

He started his business career in 1972, working in the family forging company with various general management appointments until 1996. During the course of his business career he founded companies in France, Germany and the United Kingdom.

== Political career ==
In 1991, Rübig was selected as a candidate for the Austrian People's Party for the regional elections in Upper Austria. After having been elected, he became Chairman of the then so-called EU Integration Committee, facilitating the accession of Austria to the European Union. After this period as MP, he became a Member of the European Parliament on 25 January 1996, at this time by decision of the Austrian Parliament. Since then, he was four times re-elected, namely in 1996, 1999, 2004 and 2009.

He held various positions within the Austrian Federal Economic Chamber. From 1991 to 1996 he was board member of the Upper Austria Business Promotion Institute, from 1996 to 2000 Vice-President of the Upper Austria Chamber of Commerce, and from 2000 to 2005 Industry Vice-Chairman of the federal organization of the Austrian Chamber of Commerce.

== Parliamentary Work ==
Rübig served as member of the Committee on Industry, Research and Energy, of the Committee on Budgetary Control and is a substitute member of the Committee on Budgets. As deputy chairman, he was a member of the Maghreb delegation, and was active in the delegations to the EFTA countries and to the Arabic peninsula.

As one of the initiators of the WTO Steering Committee, Rübig held the position of the EPP small businesses spokesperson. Furthermore, he is the Treasurer of the Austrian EPP delegation in the European Parliament, Chairman of the Science and Technology Options Assessment (STOA) unit and chairman of the Paneuropean Working Group in the European Parliament

== Key policy objectives ==
=== Small and medium-sized enterprises ===
Rübig advocated in the European Parliament the interests of about 20.8 million small and medium sized enterprises (SME) in Europe. In Rübig's view overcoming the global economic crisis requires a reduction of costs for SME, in particular for startup companies, significantly less red-tape, innovative SME tax regimes and more focus on independent and entrepreneurial thinking in school education.

In order to promote his political ideas in the public debate, Rübig founded in May 2012 together with the Danish MEP Bendt Bendtsen and the Bulgarian MEP Nadezhda Neynsky the business organization of the European People's Party, SME Europe. In February 2013, the General Assembly decided to choose Rübig as the Honorary President of the organization. Since 2003, he is also the President of SME Global. Furthermore, between 1999 and 2000 he was elected President of the SME Circle of the EPP Parliamentary Group, from 2000 to 2001 Co-President of the SME Union and from 2001 to 2003 he held this same position alone as its President.

=== Reduction of roaming charges ===
As responsible rapporteur in the industry committee and an active supporter of the citizens initiative Europeans for Fair Roaming, Rübig enforced the roaming rules at the European level. This initiative established maximum price ceilings for mobile providers. Rübig pushed for a general abolition of roaming charges before the elections to the European Parliament in May 2014. In the New York Times he called upon the responsible Commissioner Neelie Kroes for swift and concrete implementation plans.

=== Science policy ===
Rübig advocated for a significant increase of research funding. In the negotiations for Horizon 2020, which will follow the 7th Research Framework Programme (FP7), he supported the restructuring of the available sources towards more funding for small and medium-sized enterprises. At the same time, he requested in the ongoing budget negotiations for the new Multiannual Financial Framework (MFF) an increase of means for growth generating measures in education, science and research.

=== Fiscal responsibility ===
As member of the Budgetary Control Committee, Rübig advocated for responsible and efficient use of tax money, advocating that the use of tax money be evaluated on its efficacy, appropriateness and cost-effectiveness.

=== Energy transition ===
Rübig advocated for support of renewable energies in the energy policy of the European Union, a reduction of carbon dioxide emissions, and an increase of energy efficiency. He opposed nuclear energy with reference to the high security risks and costs in the life cycle of nuclear power plants (construction, operation, decommissioning, final storage).

=== Removal of global trade barriers ===
As EPP spokesperson in the WTO steering committee of the European Parliament, Rübig advocated for a sustainable removal of global trade barriers. Rübig also advocated giving companies the ability to actively participate in dispute settlement procedures of the World Trade Organization. He supported the possible Transatlantic Free Trade Agreement with the United States.

== Europeanization of the political debate ==
Rübig called for a Europeanization of news coverage in national newspapers and broadcasts, on the grounds that the public debates in the member states do not pay sufficiently attention to issues debated at European Union level. In this context, Rübig gave lectures at the College of Europe (CoE) and the French École nationale d’administration (ENA).

== Handover of the Peace Light ==
Since Austria joined the European Union (1995), Rübig initiated the tradition of bringing the Peace Light of Bethlehem to Strasbourg to hand the flame over to the Council of Europe, the European Parliament and the city itself.

== Other activities ==
- European Internet Foundation, Member
- European Parliament Ceramics Forum (EPCF), Member
- European Parliament Gypsum Forum, Member
- European Parliament Intergroup on "Climate Change, Biodiversity and Sustainable Development" (CCBSD), Member
- Plasma Protein Therapeutics Association (PPTA), Member

== Personal life ==
Rübig is married and the father of an adult daughter and son.

== Awards ==
- 2015: Member of the European Parliament of the Year, Category: Information and Communication Technology (ICT)
- 2013: Member of the European Parliament of the Year, Category: Research and Innovation
- 2013: Honorary President of SME Europe
- 2008: Member of the European Parliament of the Year, Category: Research and Innovation
- 2003: Grand Decoration of Honour in Gold for Services to the Republic of Austria

== Publications ==
- Mühlbacher, Hans / Rübig, Paul: Internationale Patent- und Lizenzpolitik, Marketingstudie 6. 1979.
- Rübig, Paul (ed.): Lizenzmarketing, Trauner Verlag, Herausgeber Kulhavy 1984.
- Kaspar, Achim / Rübig, Paul (eds.): Telekommunikation - Herausforderung für Österreich, Signum Verlag. 1997
- Kaspar, Achim / Rübig, Paul (eds.): Telekommunikation II, Signum Verlag. 1999
- Kaspar, Achim / Rübig, Paul (eds.): e-wwworld>2000, Linde Verlag. 2000
- Kaspar, Achim / Rübig, Paul (eds.): Telekommunikation IV. Sternzeit 2010, Linde Verlag 2006
- De Fouloy, Christian / Rübig, Paul: The way to a united Europe, Unicorn Verlag. 2004.
