= Operation Horseshoe =

1999 alleged plan to ethnically cleanse Kosovo Albanians

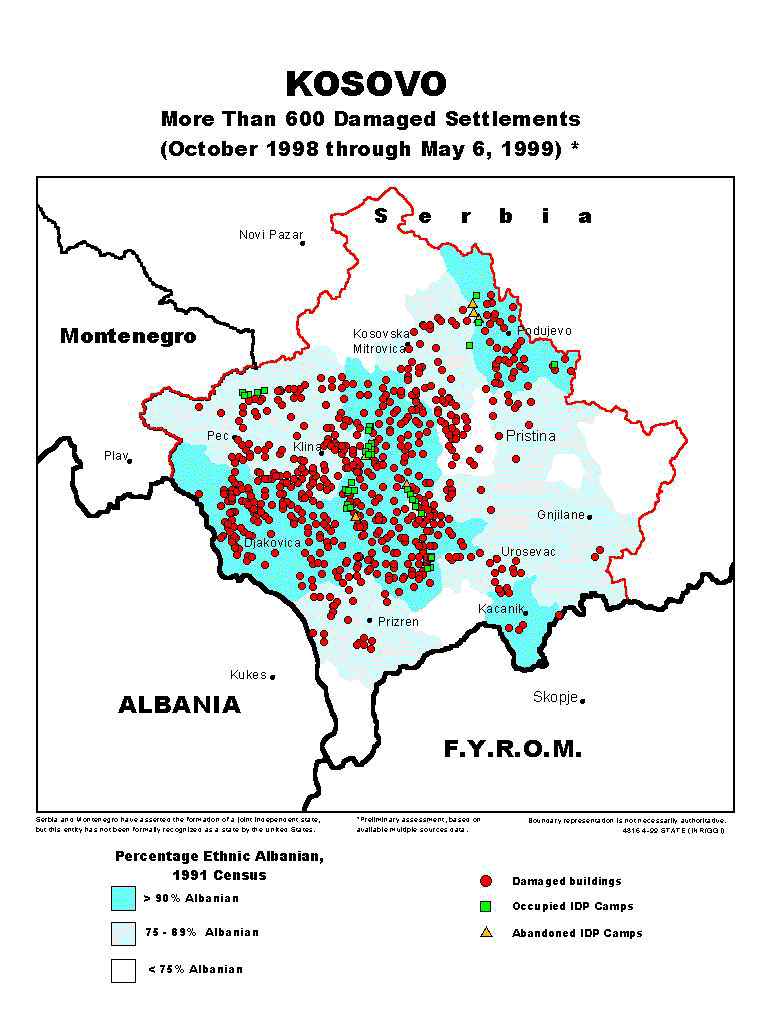
Damaged Albanian settlements in Kosovo 1998-1999.

Operation Horseshoe was a 1999 alleged plan to ethnically cleanse Kosovo Albanians and to destroy the Kosovo Liberation Army. The plan was to be carried out by Serbian police and the Yugoslav army.

In 2011, former Bulgarian Foreign Minister Nadezhda Neynsky revealed in a TV documentary that the Bulgarian government in 1999 had turned over to Germany an unverified report compiled by its military agency which "made clear" the existence of the plan, even though the military intelligence had warned that the information could not be verified.

Serbian forces did expel 848,000–863,000 Kosovo Albanians and caused the displacement of up to 590,000 within Kosovo during the Kosovo War.

== History ==
In a press conference on 6 April 1999, German Foreign Minister Joschka Fischer stated that the German government had information that the Yugoslav government had been planning a massive ethnic cleansing operation in Kosovo codenamed "Horseshoe" since 26 February 1999 and had started to implement the operation in March 1999 before the peace talks in France had concluded. Fischer accused Milošević of engaging in "ethnic warfare" directed against his own people in which a whole ethnic group had become the "victim of systematic expulsion" to "reorient the political geography" of Kosovo.

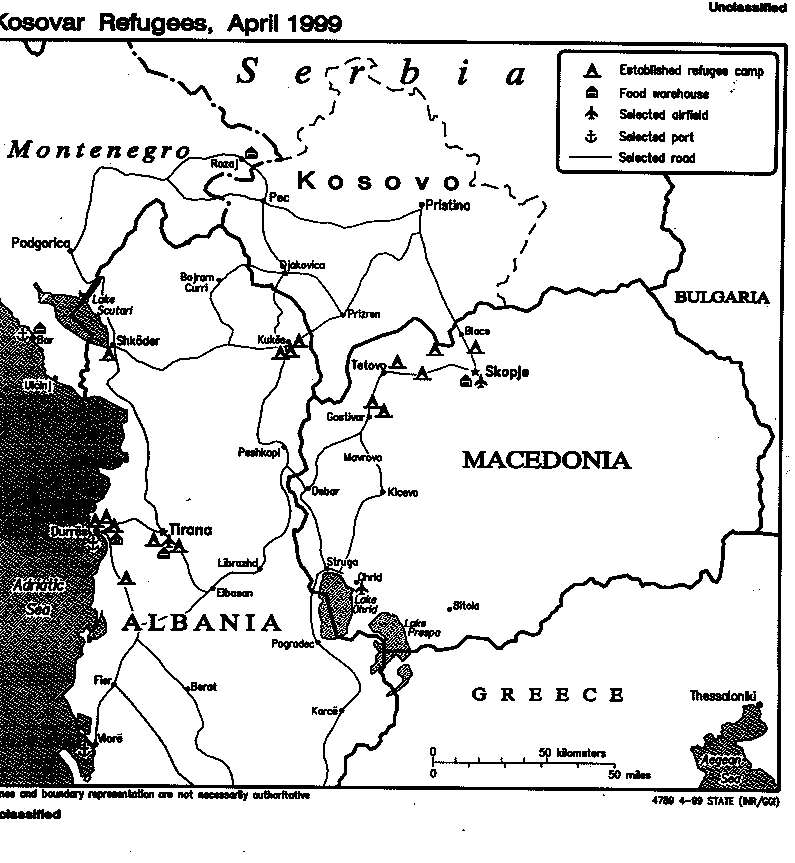
Kosovar refugees in Republic of Macedonia, Albania and Montenegro (April 1999).

In a press conference on 9 April 1999, German Defense Minister Rudolf Scharping provided further details. He presented maps containing the names of towns and villages that showed arrows representing Yugoslav army and police militia units progressively encircling Kosovo in a horseshoe-shaped pincer movement. Scharping stated, "Operation Horseshoe provided clear evidence that President Milosevic (sic) had long been preparing the expulsions from Kosovo and that he had simply used the time gained by the Rambouillet peace talks to organise army and police units for the campaign".

Contemporaneous reports from other countries supported Fischer's allegations. The Times of London reported on 8 April 1999 that "The CIA was aware as early as last autumn of a plan, codenamed Operation Horseshoe, to kill or drive them out over several months. A village a day was the rate that Mr Milosevic (sic) calculated the West would wring its hands over without acting." The British Foreign Secretary Robin Cook told a UK parliamentary committee "that there was a plan developed in Belgrade known as Operation Horseshoe which was for the cleansing of Kosovo of its Kosovo population. That plan has been around for some time".

In 2012 former Bulgarian Foreign Minister Nadezhda Neynsky said that the Bulgarian government had delivered information to Germany and NATO in 1999 about Milošević's alleged plan for the ethnic cleaning of Kosovo. However, this was in contrast to a statement made in March 2000 by a spokesman for the Bulgarian Foreign Ministry, which denied that Neynsky (then Mihaylova) had handed over information to the German Foreign Minister Joschka Fischer. In 2012 Neynsky stressed that Fischer took the report of the Bulgarian military intelligence very seriously, although Bulgarian military intelligence had warned that the information could not be verified.

== Yugoslav Army military operations ==
=== Operations before NATO intervention ===
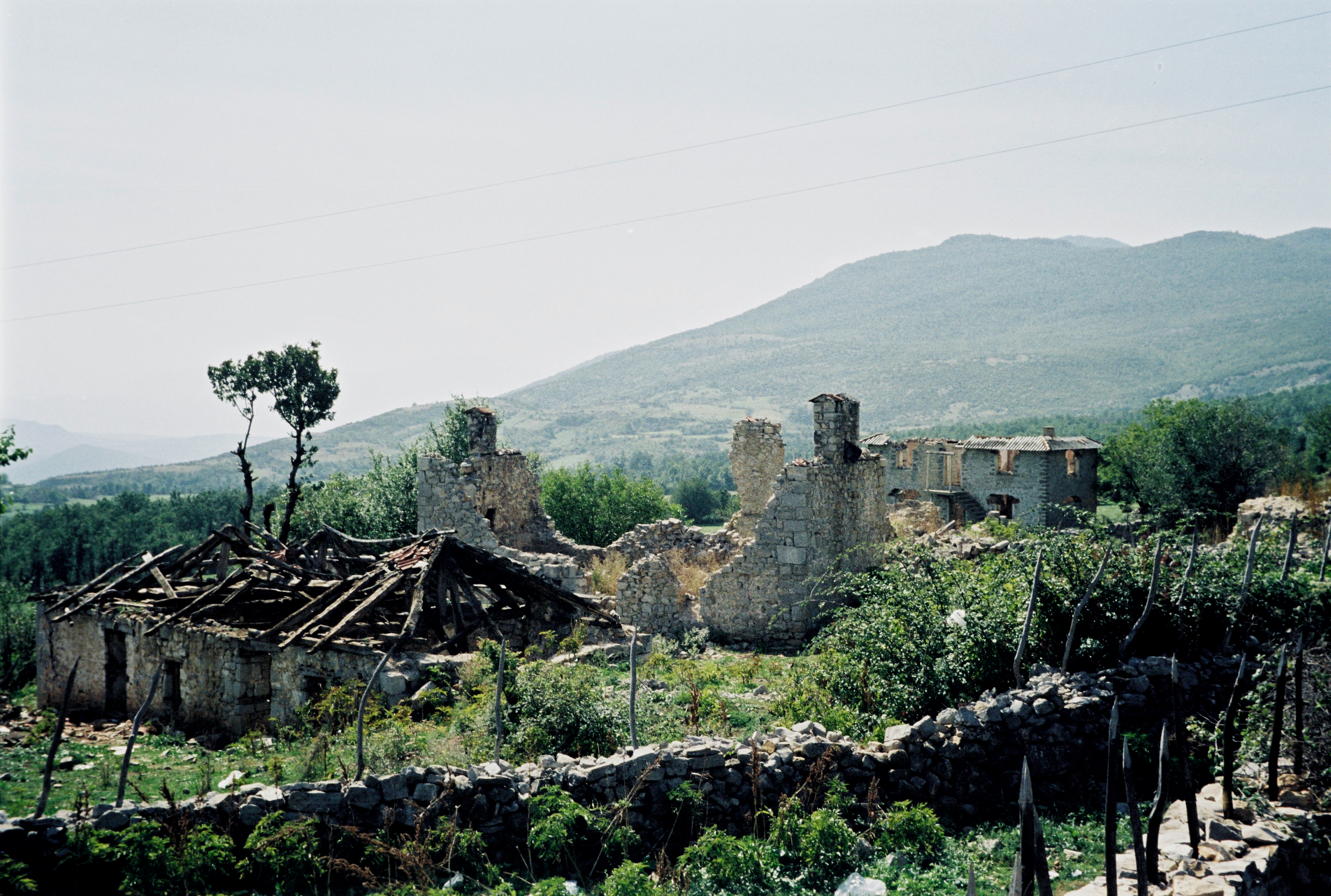
Ruins near Morinë in the White Drin valley, at the border between Albania and Kosovo. Morina was attacked on 23/24 May 1998 by the Yugoslav Army.

Daniel L. Byman and Kenneth M. Pollack date Operation Horseshoe's effective beginning to the summer of 1998, when hundreds of thousands of Kosovar Albanians were driven from their homes. Hanspeter Neuhold stated that KLA attacks after the Holbrooke-Milošević Agreement of October 1998 resulted in new Serb offensives which culminated in Operation Horseshoe directed not only against KLA fighters but also including systematic expulsions of Kosovar civilians. Michael J. Dziedzic stated that the Serbian offensive, known as Operation Horseshoe, was already in motion on 20 March 1999.

The UK Parliament Select Committee on Foreign Affairs cited an Organization for Security and Co-operation in Europe report concluding that before the start of the NATO bombing, the Serbian military campaign did not appear to be oriented towards cantonization (i.e. "aiming to bring together localities according to their ethnic composition") but rather consisted of

- "activity wherever there was KLA activity, and wherever it was suspected there were KLA sympathisers;
- efforts to control the main communication routes;
- with the approach of the bombing, securing Kosovo's borders."

=== Operations after NATO intervention ===
Jeremy Black and John Norris both state that after the beginning of NATO bombing of Yugoslavia on 24 March 1999, Serbian forces accelerated Operation Horseshoe. Peter Beaumont and Patrick Wintour of The Guardian described it as Milosevic's "final solution to the Kosovo problem".

The UK Parliament Select Committee on Foreign Affairs stated that "regardless of whether Operation Horseshoe really existed," after the bombing began, "expulsions took place in practically every municipality."

According to the verdict of the ICTY, while there is no mention of Operation Horseshoe per se,

The most compelling evidence in support of the allegation that there was a common purpose to modify the ethnic balance in Kosovo in order to ensure continued control by the FRY and Serbian authorities over the province is the evidence establishing the widespread campaign of violence that was directed against the Kosovo Albanian population between March and June 1999, and the resulting massive displacement of that population. This campaign was conducted in an organised manner, utilising significant state resources, and the Chamber heard evidence from numerous witnesses about the fact that they were directed to leave Kosovo for Albania or Macedonia, and that they were forced to relinquish their personal identity documents, either as they began their departure, en route, or at the border. These documents were never returned to them.

== Number of refugees ==
By early June 1999, more than 80 percent of the entire population of Kosovo and 90 percent of Kosovar Albanians were displaced from their homes.

— Human Right Watch report

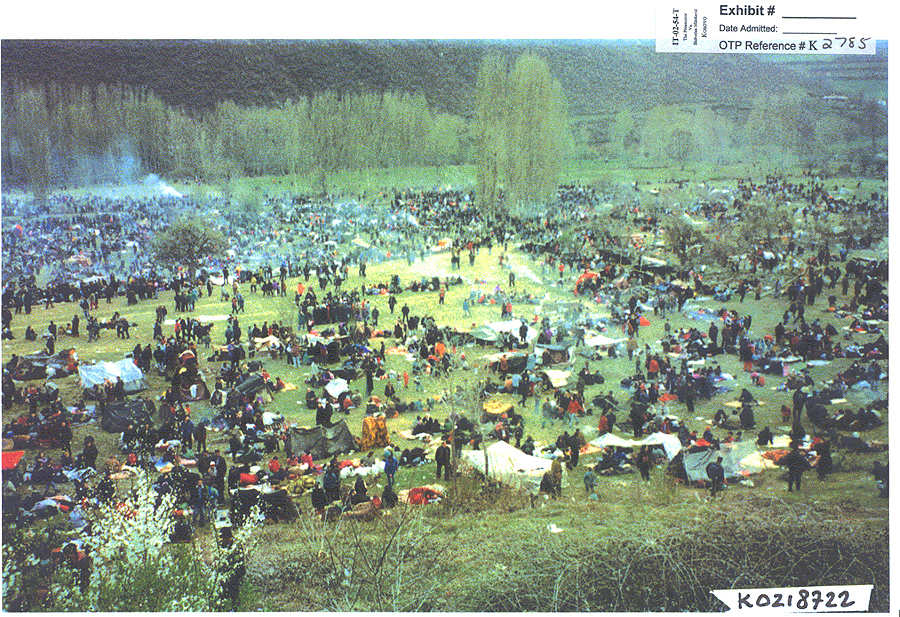
Kosovo Albanian refugees during the Kosovo War (1999). This photo was presented as evidence at the Trial of Slobodan Milošević

According to the United Nations High Commissioner for Refugees, by March 1999 (prior to NATO bombing), more than 200,000 Albanian civilians were internally displaced, almost 70,000 Albanians had fled the province to neighboring countries and Montenegro, and a further 100,000 Yugoslav nationals, mostly Kosovar Albanians, had sought asylum in Western Europe. Also, thousands of ethnic Albanian villages in Kosovo had been partially or completely destroyed by burning or shelling.

Within three weeks of the start of NATO strategic bombing during the Kosovo War, there were 525,787 refugees from Kosovo in neighboring countries. A month later, on 12 May, the total number of refugees had risen to 781,618. By June 1999, the Yugoslav military, Serbian police and paramilitaries expelled 862,979 Albanians from Kosovo; the claim was disputed by many Serbian politicians. and several hundred thousand more were internally displaced, in addition to those displaced prior to March.

Approximately 440,000 refugees crossed the border to Albania and 320,000 to Macedonia. Montenegro hosted around 70,000 refugees, and Bosnia and Herzegovina received more than 30,000. Amnesty International estimated that "nearly one million people have been forced to flee Kosovo".

Radio Television of Serbia never showed the columns of Albanians expelled by Serbian police and paramilitaries except when a convoy of fleeing Albanians was killed by NATO bombs. Moreover, Milošević's propaganda tried to convince the international public that huge columns of refugees fleeing Kosovo were because of NATO's bombing, not Yugoslav Army military operations.

== Indictments and Verdicts ==
The International Criminal Tribunal for the Former Yugoslavia charged Slobodan Milošević and other Yugoslav officials with crimes against humanity including murder, forcible population transfer, deportation and persecution of Kosovo civilians. Political scientist Kelly Greenhill observed that Operation Horseshoe was not included in this indictment.

Upon the conclusion of the trial, Presiding Judge Iain Bonomy stated that "It was the deliberate actions of these forces during this campaign that caused the departure of at least 700,000 Kosovo Albanians from Kosovo in the short period of time between the end of March and beginning of June 1999":

- Slobodan Milošević, President of Yugoslavia and Supreme Commander of the Yugoslav Army - died in 2006 during trial.
- Dragoljub Ojdanić, Chief of General Staff - sentenced to 15 years in prison; granted early release in August 2013.
- Nebojša Pavković, Commander of Third Army, which was responsible for Kosovo - sentenced to 22 years in prison.
- Vladimir Lazarević, Commander of the Pristina Corps of Third Army - sentenced to 15 years in prison; granted early release, having served two thirds of his sentence, on 7 September 2015, effective 3 December 2015.
- Vlajko Stojiljković, Interior Minister and Commander of the Serbian police - committed suicide in 2002, after the adoption of a law on cooperation with the Hague Tribunal.
- Sreten Lukić, Chief of Staff of the Serbian Police in Kosovo - sentenced to 22 years in prison. Upon appeal, the sentence was reduced on 23 January 2014 to 20 years.
- Nikola Šainović, Deputy Prime Minister of Yugoslavia - sentenced to 22 years in prison. On 26 August 2015, three months after the request by his lawyers, he was released from the prison after serving (including pretrial detention and time served) two thirds of his sentence.
- Milan Milutinović, President of the Republic of Serbia - acquitted.

== Controversy and analysis ==
The existence of Operation Horseshoe was immediately denied by Yugoslav officials. Slobodan Milošević labeled it as a "fabrication of the German Defence Ministry". Milošević denied a policy of ethnic cleansing during the NATO bombing in Kosovo and stated that "when aggression stops, when bombing stops, then it will be very easy to continue (the) political process".

Ratomir Tanić, a witness at Milošević's later war crimes trial, said that Horseshoe was a nickname for a "completely different" Yugoslav army plan that should come into effect only if the ethnic Albanian population took the side of the foreign aggressor in case of aggression on Yugoslavia. The Army would then begin "neutralising the Albanian strongholds". Tanić stated that the army leadership did not use this plan during the Kosovo War "because there was no external aggression or Albanian rebellion".

In April 2000, Heinz Loquai, a retired German brigadier general, published a book on the war that claimed that the German government's account had been based on a general analysis by a Bulgarian intelligence agency of Yugoslav behaviour in the war that was turned into a specific "plan" by the German Defence Ministry. According to Loquai, the Bulgarian analysis concluded that the goal of the Yugoslav government was to destroy the Kosovo Liberation Army, not to expel the entire Albanian population. He also pointed to a factual flaw in the German government's presentation by naming the plan "Potkova", which is the Croatian and Bulgarian word for horseshoe, but the Serbian word is potkovica. Loquai further said that the vague intelligence report had been falsified in order to divert criticism of the bombing campaign in Germany.

In a 2008 article published in the European Journal of Communication, Mark A. Wolfgram observed that

As to the actual existence of such a plan or its contents, no credible evidence has yet surfaced, although the German Defense Ministry claimed on 19 April 1999 to have delivered such evidence to chief prosecutor Louise Arbour in the Hague. None of this material has seen the light of day at the trial, and the entire Operation Horseshoe story failed to materialize in the prosecution's case against Milošević, although such evidence, if it existed, should have been critical to their case.

Greenhill has argued that the evidence does not support a premeditated plan to empty Kosovo of its Albanian inhabitants, as outlined in the alleged Horseshoe plan, describing Milosevic's actions as a "two-pronged coercive effort" designed to crush the KLA and deter NATO by using refugees for political and military purposes. Raju G. C. Thomas of Marquette University writes that the pattern of refugee outflow during the war largely began in the west and southwest, increasing in the north-central of Kosovo before moving back to the south/southwest. This contradicted claims by scholars like Ivo H. Daalder and Michael E. O’Hanlon in Winning Ugly NATO's War to Save Kosovo which said the attack involved "a broad swath of territory in the shape of a horseshoe, moving from the northeast down to the west and back to the southeast."

== Aftermath ==
It is unclear how much advance planning there was for the alleged ethnic cleansing of Kosovo, but the removal of ethnic Albanians was counterproductive as, according to British reporter and political analyst Tim Judah, it removed any possibility that Serbia would be allowed to retain control of Kosovo. The government of Serbia did not expect NATO to initiate its bombing campaign. The systematic destruction of Kosovo Albanian identity documents would have made it more difficult for them to prove their citizenship.

== See also ==
- Ethnic cleansing – Systematic removal of a certain ethnic or religious group
- Identity cleansing – Confiscation of personal documents to prevent refugees from returning
- Joint Criminal Enterprise – Concept in international criminal law
- Propaganda in the Yugoslav Wars
- War crimes in the Kosovo War
- Stenkovec camp – Refugee camp for Kosovar Albanians in FYROM, 1999
