= European Economic Senate =

The European Economic Senate (EES) is a neutral and independent body of enterprises and individuals that represent European business interests. The EES, with its national sections in six EU-countries, was founded in 2003. The EES President is the former Vice-President of the European Parliament, German conservative politician Dr. Ingo Friedrich.

== Members ==
Currently, 162 companies and economic leaders form the EES. Among these so-called senators are the CEO of Deutsche Bahn, Rüdiger Grube, the Prime Minister of Luxembourg and president of the Euro Group, Jean-Claude Juncker, and Roland Koch, the former German head of government of Hesse and former CEO of Bilfinger Berger.

National sections have been founded in middle and eastern European countries; in Germany, Austria, Switzerland, the Czech Republic, Bulgaria and Slovakia. With 49 senators, Germany represents the biggest national EES section.

EES President Dr. Ingo Friedrich was a long-time Member of the European Parliament (1979-2009). From July 2004 to January 2007, he was one of the 14 vice-presidents of the European Parliament. In 2007, he was elected one of its 6 Quaestors. Secretary-General of the European Economic Senate is Wolfgang Franken. Michael Jäger is the Chief Executive Officer.

== Guidelines ==
The EES represents the interests of its members in Europe. To quote, the Secretary-General Wolfgang Franken has stated regarding the EES-guidelines that "We have the courage, the obligation, and the confidence to create a culture of responsibility and trust. Our dialogues with the politicians and society are less emotional. We campaign against the organised lack of responsibility in almost all areas, and to work with our partners in assuming responsibilities for the economic and social interests of the businesses we represent". The EES deals with current issues such as the German nuclear pullout, the Euro-crisis and the debt crisis in Greece.
