= Solomon Passy =

Bulgarian scientist, statesman and diplomat

- Соломон Паси
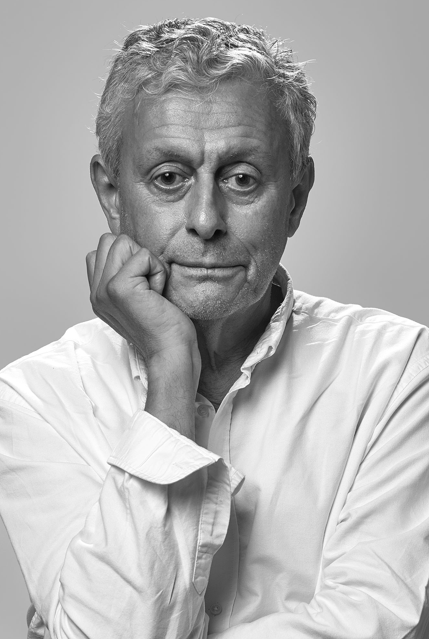
- Passy in 2024

Member of the National Assembly
- In office 11 July 2005 – 25 June 2009

Minister of Foreign Affairs
- In office 24 July 2001 – 17 August 2005
- Prime Minister: Simeon Sakskoburggotski
- Preceded by: Nadezhda Mihaylova
- Succeeded by: Ivaylo Kalfin

Member of the 7th Grand National Assembly
- In office 10 July 1990 – 2 October 1991

Personal details
- Born: Solomon Isaac Passy; 22 December 1956 (age 69) Plovdiv, Bulgaria
- Party: NDSV
- Other political affiliations: SDS (until 2001)
- Spouses: Binka Peeva (m. 1981; div. 2006) Gergana Grancharova (m. 2009)
- Children: 4
- Relatives: [[Prof. Isaac Passy]] (father)

Solomon Isaac Passy (Bulgarian: Соломон Исак Паси; born 22 December 1956) is a Bulgarian scientist, statesman and diplomat. As Foreign Minister, he was part of the negotiating team that successfully negotiated and signed Bulgaria's memberships to NATO and the EU. He also served as OSCE Chairman-in-Office and as UN Security Council Chairman.

In August 1990, as an M.P., he launched the initiative and was the first to come up with the idea for Bulgaria's accession to NATO (and subsequently to EU, Passy co-authored the bill concerning Bulgaria's membership in the EU, adopted by the Grand National Assembly in December 1990). He and the Bulgarian Ministry of Foreign Affairs' cabinet at that time negotiated as Foreign Minister the EU Accession Treaty of Bulgaria and signed it on 25 April 2005. The Bulgarian Cyrillic alphabet was adopted as the third official EU alphabet.) along with the dissolution of the Warsaw Pact — the first on European territory documented official appeal in that regard. Solomon founded the Atlantic Club as NGO arm to secure these goals. He further served on as Chairman of the Parliamentary Committees on Defence, Foreign Affairs and Security and was chair of the Transparency & Accountability committee of OSCE PA (2006–2009).

According to Alpha Research, he is the most recognized Bulgarian of Jewish descent.

He served as Bulgaria's Minister of Foreign Affairs (2001–2005) in the government of Симеон Сакскобургготски. The Ministry of Foreign Affairs under his leadership negotiated and signed the memberships of Bulgaria in both NATO and the EU (2004-2005). He chaired the Parliamentary Committees on Foreign Affairs and Defense, served as Chairman-in-Office of the Organization for Security and Co-operation in Europe (O.S.C.E.) in 2004, and presided over the United Nations Security Council in 2002 and 2003.

In 1990, he launched the Atlantic Club of Bulgaria – the only pro-NATO organisation ever operating on Warsaw Pact territory. He was officially nominated by Bulgaria as a candidate for NATO Secretary General, becoming the first Bulgarian and one of the first Eastern Europeans to be considered for the post. He is also known for his contributions to scientific research in mathematical logic, his advocacy for universal mobile phone chargers (adopted by the EU in 2011), and his involvement in organizing Antarctic expeditions in the 1990s, with Passy Peak in Livingston Island named in his honor and Atlantic Club Ridge.

Solomon Passy and Gergana Passy are recognized as initiators of the idea for a universal mobile phone charger in the European Union, launched through advocacy by the Atlantic Club of Bulgaria and the Atlantic Digital Network in 2008. Their initiative contributed to the EU-wide standardization process adopted by the European Commission and European Parliament, aiming to reduce electronic waste, carbon emissions, and improve technological interoperability across Europe.

== Career, diplomacy and politics ==
=== The Berlin Wall era ===
Solomon Isaac Passy was born on 22 December 1956, in Plovdiv. His parents are the philosopher Prof. Isaac Passy and Dr. Lilia Uzunova, an endocrinologist. He comes from a family with a strong civic and academic tradition. In the 1980s, Passy was an activist of various opposition, underground and ecological movements opposing communism, including in defense of the oppressed Turkish minority in Bulgaria; in solidarity with them, he assumed the Turkish pseudonym Syuleyman Tehlikeli when publishing mathematical papers and graphics art in the 1980s.

He attended the Solidarity Trade Union Congress in Gdansk in the fall of 1981. In May 1987, Passy was the co-host-organizer of the first public opposition happening in Sofia University. After his efforts in communist Bulgaria, in 1990–1991, as MP in the Grand National Assembly, he co-authored the first democratic Constitution of the Republic of Bulgaria and tabled the bill for abolishment of the death penalty in Bulgaria.

=== Atlantic and European integration ===
In August 1990, Passy, then a Member of Parliament in the Grand National Assembly, publicly advocated Bulgaria’s withdrawal from the Warsaw Pact and future accession to N.A.T.O.

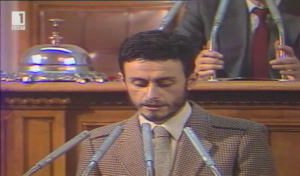
Solomon Passy in Bulgarian's National Assembly in 1990

In November 1990, founders of the Atlantic Club of Bulgaria led by Passy visited N.A.T.O. headquarters in Brussels at the invitation of N.A.T.O. Secretary General Manfred Wörner and U.S. Permanent Representative to N.A.T.O. William Taft IV.

In June 1991, N.A.T.O. SG Manfred Wörner agreed to be "kidnapped" in Sofia by Solomon Passy in his East German car Trabant. Manfred Wörner became a supporter of ACB and personally endorsed in 1992 ACB's accession as first CEE member of ATA. ACB erected a monument in Sofia of him in 1996, which was inaugurated by his successor Javier Solana.

For 14 years, Passy worked on Bulgaria's membership of N.A.T.O., which was finalized on 2 April 2004 when Minister Passy raised the Bulgarian flag over N.A.T.O. HQ in Brussels.

In September 1990, Passy became co-author of the draft of the Parliamentary Bill for Bulgaria's participation in the U.S.-led coalition that liberated Kuwait from Saddam Hussein's occupation.

=== Globalization of Bulgaria ===
ACB is the first non-N.A.T.O. NGO invited to join the Atlantic Treaty Association, in 1992. Passy is the first non-N.A.T.O. Vice-President of ATA (1996-1999). Bulgaria is the first non-N.A.T.O. member state to host an ATA General Assembly (1997). In 2024, a special moment was the presentation of a special award to Dr. Solomon Passy for his outstanding contribution and example to the ATA.

In 1991, Dr. Solomon Passy gave a surprising lift in his Trabant to N.A.T.O.'s Secretary General Manfred Wörner in Sofia, transforming this car into a symbol of Bulgaria's dream to join N.A.T.O. and of the Atlantic Club of Bulgaria. In 2002, after "Trabi" was blessed by Pope John Paul II, Bulgaria was invited to join N.A.T.O. and the E.U. Today, "Trabi" is exhibited at Bulgaria's National Military History Museum in Sofia, while its replica is on display at N.A.T.O. Headquarters in Brussels as a symbol of N.A.T.O.'s 2004 "Big Bang" enlargement, with seven countries, including Bulgaria.

Passy and the Atlantic Club of Bulgaria in November 1994, invited Pope John Paul II to Bulgaria. The visit, the first papal visit to Bulgaria, took place in 2002 when Passy was Foreign Minister; the Pope announced in Sofia that Bulgaria – contrary to widespread allegations — had not been involved in the 1981 attempt to assassinate the Pope.

Passy co-chaired the host committee of the ACB-Tibetan Friendship Society for the visit to Bulgaria of the XIV Dalai Lama of Tibet in October 1991.

Passy's ACB hosted Ecumenical Patriarch Bartholomew in 1993, subsequent dialogue between the Bulgarian Orthodox Church and the Vatican eventually made the Bulgarian visit of Pope John Paul II possible.

In 1993, Passy and the Atlantic Club were instrumental in establishing the Bulgarian Antarctic Institute and the country's annual Antarctic expeditions as part of its national Antarctic program. Bulgaria became the 28th Consultative Party to the Antarctic Treaty in 1998.

In 1999, Passy became co-chair of the Host Committee for the first US presidential visit to Bulgaria, by President Bill Clinton.

== Education ==
Passy holds a PhD (1985) and MSc (1979) in Mathematical Logic and Computer Sciences from Sofia University St. Kliment Ohridski.

He has published dozens of academic papers on mathematical logic and computer sciences. The Combinatory Dynamic Logic (Modal Logic with Nominals) was developed in Bulgaria by Passy and Professors Tinko Tinchev, George Gargov, Valentin Goranko, and Dimitar Vakarelov.

Solomon Passy is the co-initiator of the STEAM and Space festival "HELLO SPACE | Bulgaria Calling!" and one of the leading public advocates for Space & STEAM education in Bulgaria. Under his vision, the festival was launched in 2021 and has since developed into Bulgaria's largest annual Space & STEAM initiative, organized by the STEAM & Space Cluster and coordinated by the Atlantic Club of Bulgaria.

From its first to sixth edition, HELLO SPACE has brought together astronauts, scientists, engineers, innovators, and international institutions to inspire young people through science, imagination, knowledge, creativity, and exploration. The festival has featured participation from NASA, ESA, CERN, Lockheed Martin, Axiom Space, SatCen, EnduroSat, and other global organizations, alongside live conversations with astronauts such as Mark Vande Hei, Thomas Pesquet, Anna Lee Fisher, Michael Lopez-Alegría, and Eytan Stibbe. From the first edition in 2021, from the live talk with astronauts on the International Space Station, right up to the latest issue, which, for the first time, featured two astronauts together.

Under Passy's leadership and vision, the initiative has expanded into a large-scale educational platform combining motivational lectures, interactive STEAM exhibitions, robotics, scientific experiments, competitions, virtual tours, workshops, artistic installations, and hands-on learning experiences designed to inspire future generations toward science, technology, engineering, arts, mathematics, and space exploration.

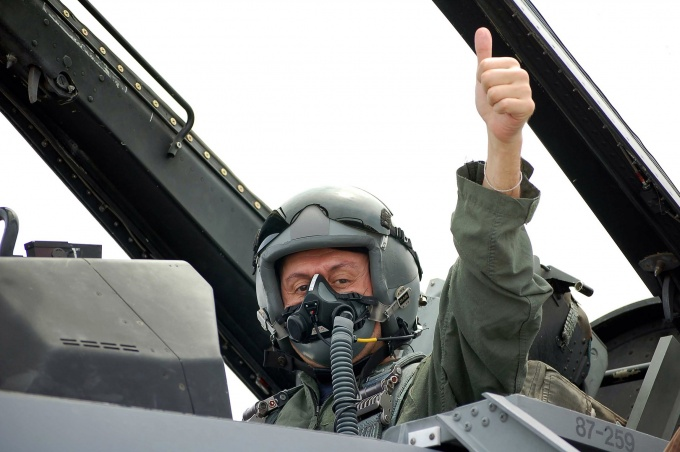
Dr. Solomon Passy flying an F-16

The festival's long-term mission is to encourage innovation, imagination, and scientific curiosity among young people while supporting Bulgaria's ambition to strengthen its role in the global space community and contribute to the future journey toward a third Bulgarian astronaut in Space.

He is the author of numerous publications in leading international journals on logic and computer science and in other international publications. Some of his projects are Health Shield Europe, Africa Now, DeBrain Washing, The project for a common charger for E.U. countries etc. He has published several books, including the chronicle "Passy of Fez" — a product of Jewish and Arab culture (Passy comes from El-Fasi) about his paternal lineage, or "The Chronicle of the Uzunov Family," which traces his maternal lineage etc.

== Personal life ==
In 2009, Solomon married Gergana Gruncharova (known as Gergana Passy) in the village of Stoykite. The couple withdrew from political life to devote themselves to the non-governmental sector and public causes. They have 4 children - Isaac, Katerina (from their first marriages) and Mihaela and David.

== See also ==
- List of foreign ministers in 2005
- Foreign relations of Bulgaria
- List of Bulgarians

Political offices
Preceded by Nadezhda Mihaylova	Foreign Minister of Bulgaria; 24 July 2001 – 17 August 2005	Succeeded by Ivaylo Kalfin
