= Ekaterina Mihaylova =

Bulgarian politician

- Екатерина Михайлова
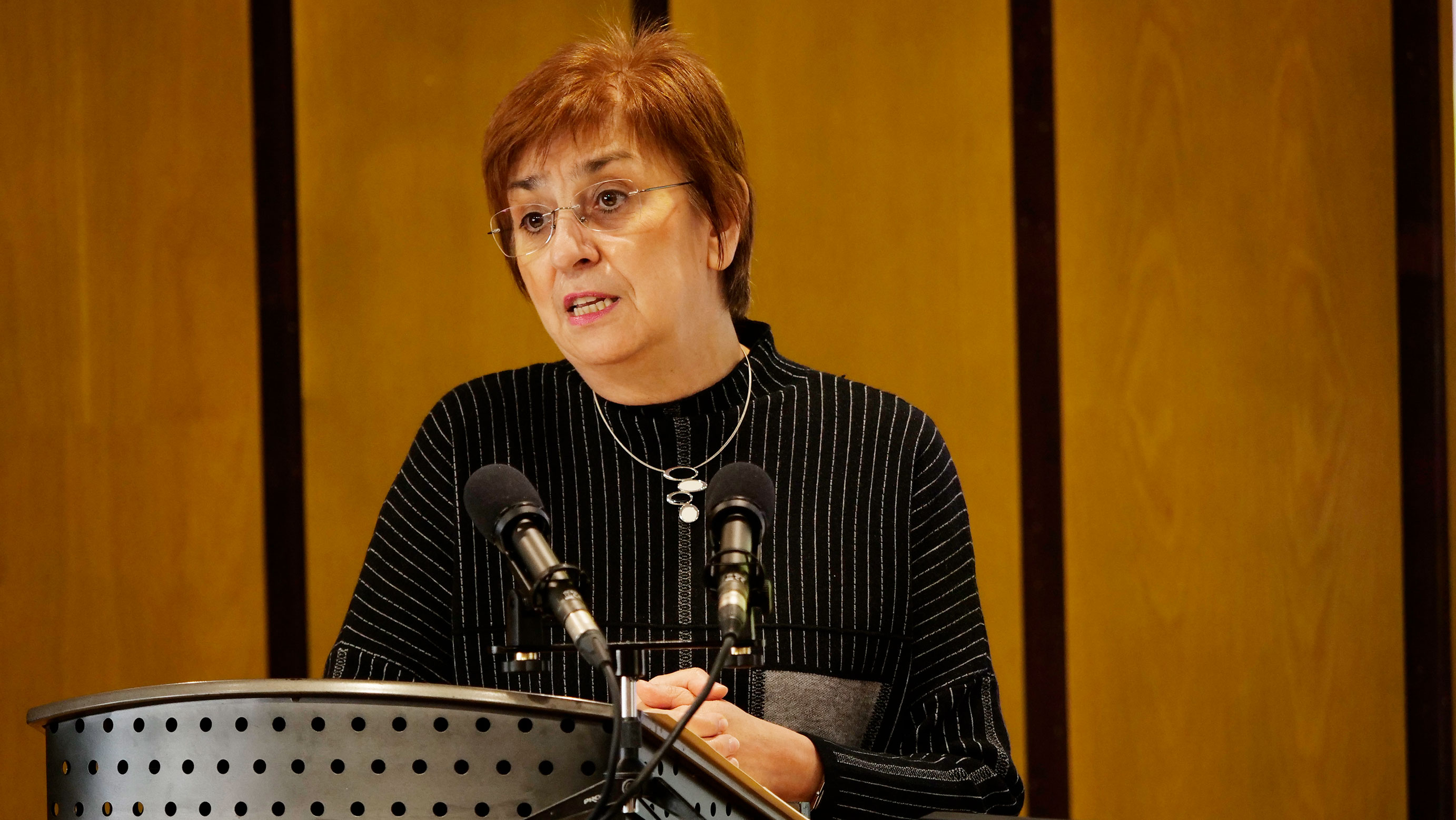
- Prof. Ekaterina Mihaylova during the conference Media in Bulgaria: 30 Years Later, Aula of the New Bulgarian University, November 21, 2019

Leader of the Union of Democratic Forces
- In office 26 June 2001 – 10 March 2002
- Preceded by: Ivan Kostov
- Succeeded by: Nadezhda Mihaylova

Member of the National Assembly
- In office 4 November 1991 – 15 March 2013
- Constituency: 25th MMC - Sofia

Personal details
- Born: 24 October 1956 (age 69) Pazardzhik, Bulgaria
- Party: Democrats for Strong Bulgaria
- Other political affiliations: SDS (until 2004)
- Profession: Politician, Lawyer

Ekaterina Ivanova Mihaylova (Bulgarian: Екатерина Иванова Михайлова, born 24 October 1956) is a Bulgarian politician, who was the leader of the UDF between 2001 and 2002.

== Life ==
Mihaylova was born in Pazardzhik, in the family of a lawyer and a physician. She graduated from Sofia University in 1978 with a degree in legal studies and started working as an attorney in 1980.

Her political career began in the 1990s when she gained prominence as a member of the UDF. Alongside Yordan Sokolov, she is considered to be among the staunchest supporters of Ivan Kostov and his policies.

In June 2001, Mihaylova succeeded Kostov as the leader of the UDF, but in March 2002 lost her position to Nadezhda Mihaylova at the 13th national conference of the party. In 2004 she became one of the founders of the DSB.

Mihaylova has been a member of five National Parliaments.

On 6 November 2007, she was honored with the academic title "honorary professor of New Bulgarian University" for her significant contributions to the development of the theoretical and practical aspects of Bulgarian parliamentarism.

== Books ==
- Prodanov, Vasil; Todorov, Antoniy; Avramov, Yosif; Ivanova, Vanya (2009). Българският парламент и преходът (1st ed.). Sofia: Ciela. ISBN 978-954-28-0352-2.
