= Ingo Friedrich =

German politician

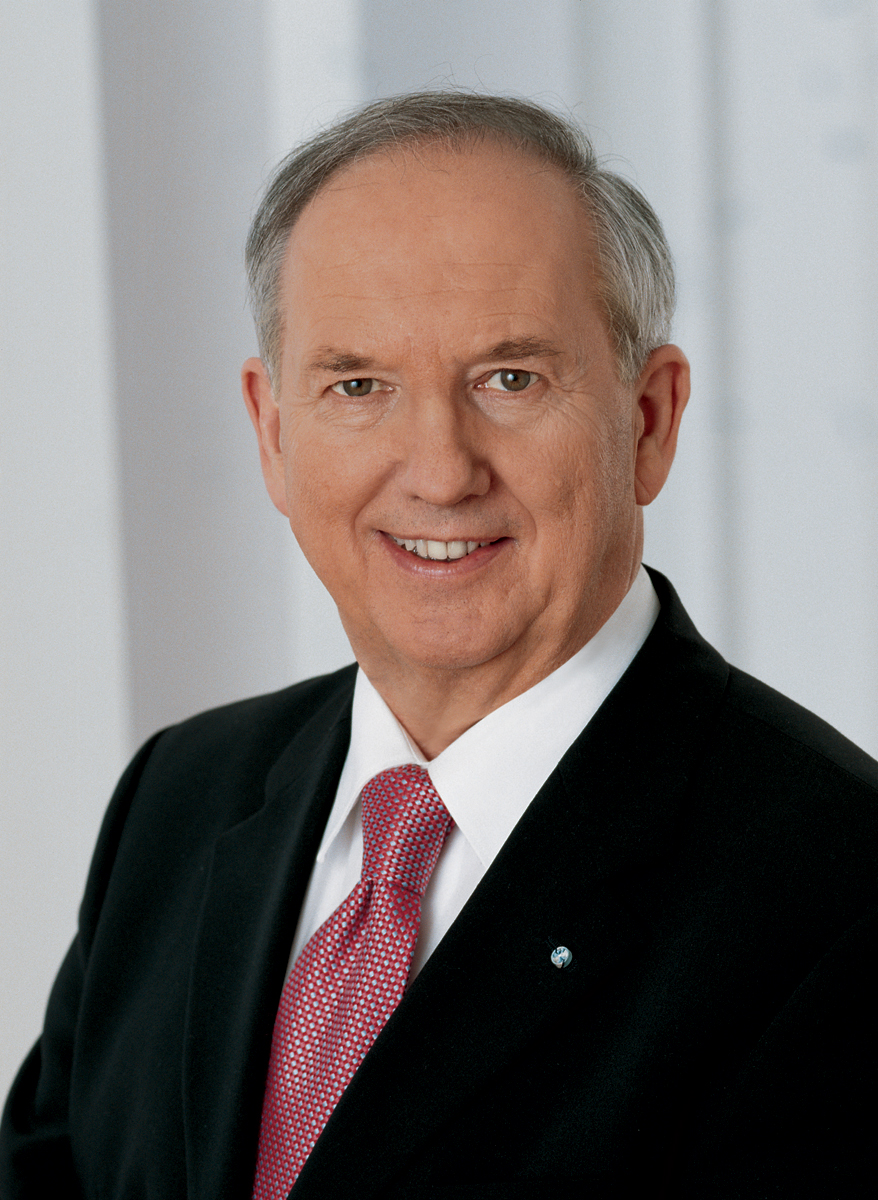
- Ingo Friedrich
- Born: 24 January 1942 (age 84)
- Occupation: German politician

Ingo Friedrich (born 24 January 1942 in Kutno-Wartheland) is a former German (Bavarian) Member of the European Parliament. He was elected on the CSU ticket and sits with the EPP-ED Group. Friedrich holds a University degree in Economics. He was a member of Weißenburg-Gunzenhausen district council (1972–1996) and was the head of the CSU delegation to the European Parliament between 1992 and 1999. He has been awarded the Bavarian Order of Merit, and the Federal Cross of Merit, first class.

From July 2004 to January 2007 Friedrich was one of the 14 Vice-Presidents of the European Parliament. From October 2002, he holds the position of Treasurer of the European People's Party (EPP). On 16 January 2007 he was elected one of the 6 Quaestors of the European Parliament. Since September 2009 he has been President of the European Economic Senate. On 20 February 2013 Friedrich became Honorary Member of SME Europe, the pro-business organization within the European People's Party, which aims at improving the situation of small and medium-sized enterprises all across Europe.
