= Isaac Passy =

Bulgarian Jewish philosopher (1928–2010)

Isaac Passy (Bulgarian: Исак Паси; 13 March 1928 in Plovdiv – 13 August 2010) was a Bulgarian Jewish philosopher specializing in history, literature and aesthetics. He was a prominent professor at Sofia University from 1952 until 1993. He published over 40 monographs and edited some 80 volumes with philosophical texts and in history of philosophy from various epochs. He is the father of the Bulgarian politician and diplomat Solomon Passy.

== Selected bibliography ==
- Tragic (1963)
- Philosophical Literary Studies (1968, 1981, 1987, 1993)
- Funny (1972, 1979, 1993, 2001, 2002)
- Thomas Mann (1975, 2008)
- Aesthetics of Kant (1976)
- French moralists (1978)
- Essays (1981, 1987, 1993)
- German classical aesthetics (1982, 1985, 1991)
- Metaphor (1983, 1988, 1995, 2001, 2002)
- Aesthetics of German Romanticism (1984) (collection)
- At the Sources of Modern Aesthetics (1987)
- Problems, people, memories (1992)
- Autobiographical essays and articles (1994, 1997, 2002)
- Towards a philosophy of life. Eight philosophical portrait (1994)
- Biography of the Spirit (1994, 2000, 2004, 2005, 2007)
- Thoughts and Thinkers (1995, 1998)
- Russian Thinkers (1996, 2000)
- Friedrich Nietzsche (1996)
- Arthur Schopenhauer (1998)
- Søren Kierkegaard (1998)
- Human and People (1998)
- Fragments. Miniatures. Travels (1998)
- Contemporary Spanish Philosophy: Miguel de Unamuno and human tragedy, Jose Ortega y Gasset and the sociology of our century (1999)
- Philosophical fragments and miniatures (2000)
- Ralph Waldo Emerson (2000)
- Schopenhauer, Kierkegaard, Nietzsche (2001)
- Nikolai Berdyaev. Portrait of Philosophical Experience (2001)
- Justification of human behavior: 14 social-psychological Essays (2002)
- Selected Works in 6 volumes (2003-2004)
- Man does not live only with reason: Ten Essays on European iratsionalizam (2006)
- Reasons for human behavior: 60 social-psychological Essays (2006)
- French thinkers (2007)
- Portraits of Philosophy (2007)
- Philosophical portraits, miniatures and fragments (2008)
- Philosophical messages (2008)
- Autobiography. Forty-four philosophical experiences (2009)

== Edited books of great thinkers ==
Blaise Pascal, Arthur Schopenhauer, Friedrich Nietzsche, Gustave LeBon, Dmitry Merezhkovski, Henri Bergson, Sigmund Freud, Carl Gustav Jung, Miguel de Unamuno, Jose Ortega y Gasset, Søren Kierkegaard, Vladimir Solovyov, Lev Shestov, Nikolai Berdyaev, Thomas Mann, Cicero, Horace and several others.
