= SME Europe =

Business association of the European People's Party

SME Europe of the European People's Party
- Abbreviation: SME Europe of the EPP
- Formation: 4 June 2013; 12 years ago
- Purpose: SME Europe advocates for pro-SME policies, supporting entrepreneurship and competitiveness in the EU
- Headquarters: Brussels, Belgium
- Official language: English
- President: Jörgen Warborn
- Website: smeeurope.eu

SME Europe (Small and Medium Entrepreneurs of Europe) is the official business association of the European People's Party advocating for the rights and interests of small and medium-sized enterprises (SMEs) across Europe. The organisation was founded in May 2012 by the Members of the European Parliament, Paul Rübig, Nadezhda Neynsky and Bendt Bendtsen.

SME Europe is dedicated to empowering SMEs by advocating for policies that reduce bureaucracy, improve access to finance, drive digital transformation, support sustainability and enhance market access. SME Europe organizes public hearings, conferences, and events that bring together stakeholders from the European Parliament, the European Commission, industry representatives, academia, and SMEs. These discussions serve as a platform for exchanging opinions, knowledge, and policy positions to develop common solutions or enhance mutual understanding of different perspectives. The organization seeks to create an environment where SMEs can flourish by influencing EU legislation and fostering collaboration between policymakers, entrepreneurs, and industry experts.

SME Europe's Board is currently represented by Jörgen Warborn (President), Iuliu Winkler, Angelika Winzig, Eva Maydell, Aura Salla, Sunčana Glavak, Niels Flemming Hansen, Riho Terras, Marion Walsmann and Markus Pieper.

Former presidents: Ivan Štefanec 2018–2024; Bendt Bendtsen 2015–2018; Nadezhda Neynsky 2012–2015.
