= Marko Balabanov =

Bulgarian politician and diplomat (1837–1921)

Marko Balabanov Марко Балабанов
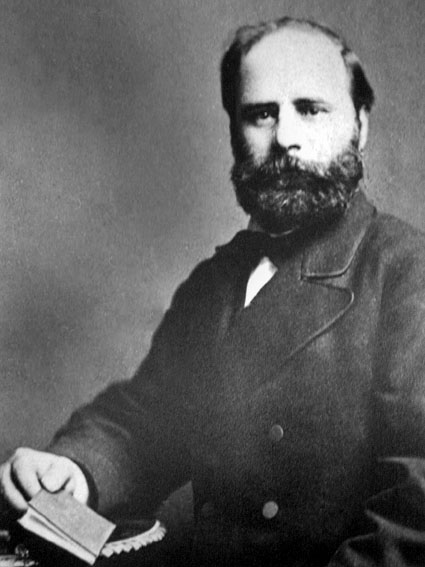

Minister of Foreign Affairs
- In office 5 July 1879 – 24 November 1879
- Premier: Todor Burmov
- Preceded by: Office established
- Succeeded by: Grigor Nachovich

Minister of Foreign Affairs
- In office 7 September 1883 – 30 June 1884
- Premier: Dragan Tsankov
- Preceded by: Kiryak Tsankov
- Succeeded by: Iliya Tsanov

Personal details
- Born: 1837 Klisura, Ottoman Bulgaria
- Died: 16 July 1921 (aged 83–84) Sofia, Bulgaria
- Party: Progressive Liberal Party (from 1899)

Marko Dimitriev Balabanov (Bulgarian: Марко Димитриев Балабанов; 1837 – 16 June 1921) was a Bulgarian politician and diplomat. He was the first Minister of Foreign Affairs of the country and served twice on that post. He was also briefly Chairperson of the National Assembly of Bulgaria. Balabanov was a member of the Conservative Party and the Progressive Liberal Party.

== Biography ==
=== Early years ===
Marko Balabanov was born in 1837 in Klisura, then in Ottoman Bulgaria, in the family of a hodden artisan. He studied in a monastery school in his home village and then under the patronage of bishop Konstantius of Bursa graduated the Halki seminary. In the following years he studied law in Athens and Paris, medicine in Paris and philosophy in Heidelberg. In 1870 he settled in Istanbul, the capital of the Ottoman Empire, and practiced as a lawyer and a journalist. He worked for the establishment of an independent Bulgarian Exarchate. In 1871, Balabanov was a representative of the Plovdiv Diocese at the first Bulgarian Church–People's Assembly in Istanbul and was elected a secretary of the Holy Synod. He was among the delegates who signed the newly adopted Statute of the Bulgarian Exarchate on 14 May 1871. He was an editor of the Chitalishte magazine until 1871 and of the Vek newspaper in 1874–1876, both issued in Istanbul. In the autumn of 1876, together with Dragan Tsankov, he toured Europe to present the plight of the Bulgarian people after the bloody suppression of the Bulgaria April Uprising.

=== Political career ===
Following the Russo-Turkish War of 1877–1878 and the Liberation of Bulgaria, Balabanov served as a vice governor of Svishtov and Rise in the interim Provisional Russian Administration in Bulgaria. He was a member of the Constituent National Assembly in 1879 as a representative of the Conservative Party. Balabanov was appointed as the first Minister of Foreign Affairs of Bulgaria under the first government of the country under Prime Minister Todor Burmov and served on that post for several month in 1879. In 1880–1883 he was a diplomatic representative in the Ottoman Empire. In 1882 he joined the a wing of the Liberal Party under Dragan Tsankov, which became the Progressive Liberal Party in 1884. He again served as Minister of Foreign Affairs in 1883–1884 in the second and third government of Dragan Tsankov. He briefly served as the Chairperson of the National Assembly of Bulgaria of the 11th National Assembly of Bulgaria in 1901–1902.

Marko Balabanov taught Greek language and literature in 1889–1884 and Roman, Byzantine and Church law in 1892–1902 in Sofia University. He was dean of the university's Faculty of Law in 1896–1897. In 1881 he became a correspondent member of the Bulgarian Academy of Science and three years later became a full member of the institution. In 1902–1903 he served as a diplomatic representative in Romania and in 1905 — in Greece.

Marko Balabanov died on 16 June 1921 in Sofia.

== Sources ==
- Георгиев (Georgiev), Владимир (Vladimir) (1977). Енциклопедия България. Том I. А-В [Encyclopaedia Bulgaria. Volume I. A-V] (in Bulgarian). и колектив. София (Sofia): Издателство на БАН (Bulgarian Academy of Sciences Press).
- Ташев (Tahsev), Ташо (Tasho) (1999). Министрите на България 1879–1999 (The Ministers of Bulgaria (1879–1999)) (in Bulgarian). София (Sofia): АИ „Проф. Марин Дринов“ (Prof. Marin Drinov Press). ISBN 978-954-430-603-8.
- Цураков (Tsurakov), Ангел (Angel) (2008). Енциклопедия на правителствата, народните събрания и атентатите в България (Encyclopedia of the Governments, National Assemblies and Terrorist Acts in Bulgaria) (in Bulgarian). София (Sofia): Изд. на „Труд“ (Trud Press). ISBN 978-954-528-790-9.

Political offices
| Preceded by Office established | Minister of Foreign Affairs of Bulgaria; 1879 | Succeeded by Grigor Nachovich |
| Preceded by Kiryak Tsankov | Minister of Foreign Affairs of Bulgaria; 1883–1884 | Succeeded by Iliya Tsanov |
| Preceded by Ivan Evstratiev Geshov | Chairperson of the National Assembly of Bulgaria; 1901–1902 | Succeeded by Dragan Tsankov |

Template:Foreign ministers of Bulgaria
