= Velislava Petrova-Chamova =

Bulgarian politician

- Велислава Петрова-Чамова
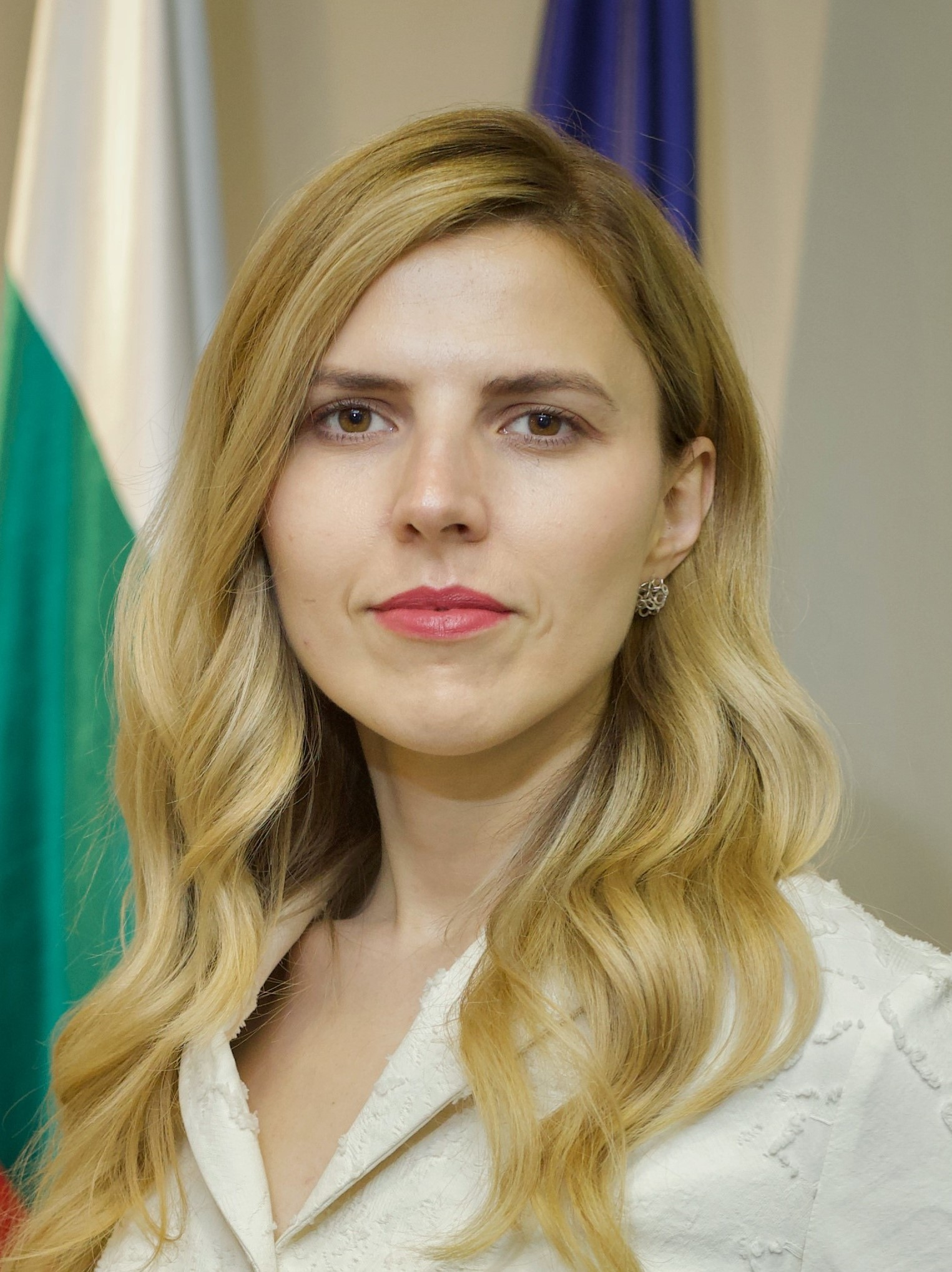
- Official portrait, 2026

Minister of Foreign Affairs
- Incumbent
- Assumed office 8 May 2026
- Prime Minister: Rumen Radev
- Preceded by: Nadezhda Neynsky

Personal details
- Born: 5 June 1990 (age 36) Sandanski, PR Bulgaria
- Party: Independent

Velislava Petrova-Chamova (Bulgarian: Велислава Петрова-Чамова; born 5 June 1990) is a Bulgarian politician serving as minister of foreign affairs since 2026. From 2022 to 2023, she served as deputy minister of foreign affairs.

Petrova-Chamova holds a degree in Microbiology from the University of Bristol and a doctorate from thе Wellcome Sanger Institute, where her doctoral research focused on infectious diseases.

Her political career began at the United Nations, where she worked in a program focused on combating AIDS. During the COVID-19 pandemic, she was involved at the UN level in coordinating global vaccination and immunization efforts. At the same time, she worked with the World Health Organization (WHO) and the World Bank on health risk issues. In 2024, she worked in Brussels at the Centre for Future Generations.

From 2022 to 2023, she served as Deputy Minister of Foreign Affairs in the governments of Kiril Petkov and Galab Donev, where she was responsible for Bulgaria’s accession to the Schengen Area.

Political offices
Preceded by Nadezhda Neynsky	Minister of Foreign Affairs of Bulgaria; 2026–present	Incumbent
