= Ministry of Foreign Affairs (Bulgaria) =

Government ministry of Bulgaria

- Министерство на външните работи Ministerstvo na Vanšnite Raboti
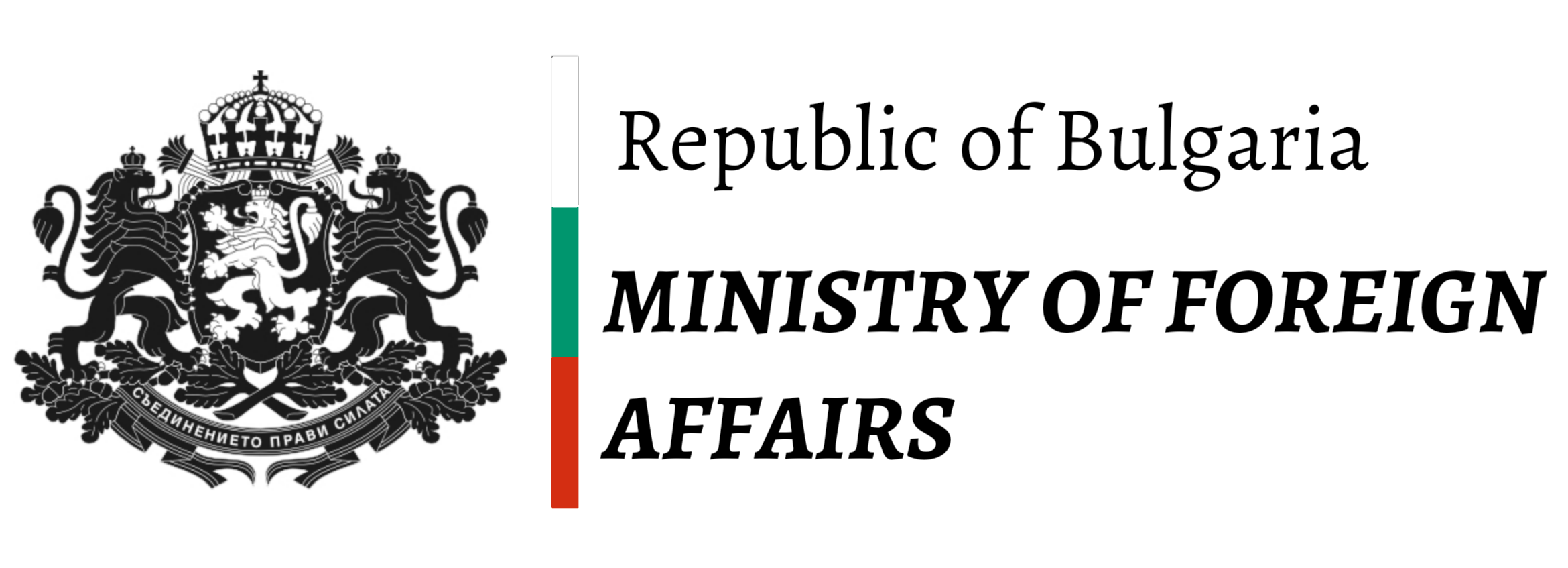
- Ministerial insignia

- Ministry of Foreign Affairs building in Sofia

Agency overview
- Formed: 5 July 1879
- Jurisdiction: Government of Bulgaria
- Headquarters: Sofia, 2 Alexander Zhendov Str
- Agency executive: Velislava Petrova-Chamova, Minister of Foreign Affairs
- Website: www.mfa.bg

The Ministry of Foreign Affairs (Bulgarian: Министерство на външните работи, romanized: Ministerstvo na Vanšnite raboti, abbreviated МВнР, or MVnR) of Bulgaria is the ministry charged with overseeing the foreign relations of Bulgaria. The seat of the ministry is located at 2 Alexander Zhendov Str in the capital Sofia. It has been in existence since shortly after the Liberation of Bulgaria, with the first minister stepping into office on 17 July 1879. The institution was among the first six ministries of the reestablished Bulgarian state. Until 1947, it was known as the Ministry of Foreign Affairs and Religious Denominations. The Minister of Foreign Affairs is a member of the Government of Bulgaria, also known as the Council of Ministers. The current officeholder Nadezhda Neynsky was reappointed in February 2026. She previously served from 1997 to 2001 as Nadezhda Mihaylova.

The ministry maintains the diplomatic and consular relations of Bulgaria with other countries and international organisations, operates the diplomatic missions of Bulgaria and supervises the implementation of the international legal obligations of the country. It protects the rights and interests of the Bulgarian state and citizens oversees and undertakes diplomatic actions to protect the Bulgarian cultural and historical heritage abroad. It also guides the Bulgarian international development aid programme.

== History ==
Following the Russo-Turkish War of 1877–1878 and the Liberation of Bulgaria, in 1878 the interim Provisional Russian Administration in Bulgaria established the Office for General Affairs and Diplomatic Relations. After the adoption of the Tarnovo Constitution, on 25 May 1879 it was renamed the Department of Foreign Affairs. In accordance with article 161 of the Constitution, with a Decree published on 17 July 1879 the Ministry of Foreign Affairs and Religious Denominations was formally established as a central state institution for organising, directing and conducting the foreign policy of Bulgaria through diplomatic missions oversees. Marko Balabanov was appointed as the first Minister of Foreign Affairs by Prince Alexander of Battenberg. On 19 July 1879 the Prince appointed the first diplomatic representatives abroad — Dragan Tsankov in Istanbul, the Ottoman Empire, Evlogi Georgiev in Bucharest, the Kingdom of Romania, and Dimitar Kirovich in Belgrade, the Principality of Serbia.

The first Regulations for the Organisation of the Ministry of Foreign Affairs and Religious Denominations were published in 1897. In 1903 was adopted the Law on Organization and Service, which defined the structure of the institution that included Office of the Minister of Foreign Affairs, Political Department, Archive and Library, Consular Department, Religions Denominations Department, Bulgarian Telegraph Agency and Accounting. That structure remained in force with little changes until the organisation was renamed as the Ministry of Foreign Affairs following the Dimitrov Constitution of 1947 and the establishment of the People's Republic of Bulgaria. In 2007 the National Assembly adopted the Law on the Diplomatic Service, which regulates the principles, organisation and activity of the diplomatic service, as well as the rules for the professional development of diplomatic servicemen.

== Structure ==
The institution is headed by the Minister of Foreign Affairs, and consists of the Political Cabinet, special administration and general administration, as well as inspectorate and internal audit. The Political Cabinet includes the Deputy Ministers of Foreign Affairs, the Head of the Cabinet, the Speaker, the Parliamentary Secretary and advisors. The special administration is coordinated by a Permanent Secretary and consists of four general directorates and a number of specialised directorates, covering the bilateral relations, international cooperation, EU policy, security policy, foreign economic relations, international development, human rights, consular relations, crisis management, international law, state protocol, foreign policy planning, press, etc. The general administration is coordinated by a Secretary General and includes the directorates responsible for human resources, budget and finance, property management, material and technical support, security and IT.

== Headquarters ==
Since 1983 the Ministry of Foreign Affairs has been based in a purpose-built edifice in the district of Slatina east of the Sofia city center, situated at 2 Alexander Zhendov Str. It lies just northeast of the city's largest boulevard Tsarigradsko shose and its oldest park Borisova gradina. The competition for the building design was held in 1970 and was awarded to the Sofproekt architect bureau under the architects Bogdan Tomalevski and Lozan Lozanov. The planning and design phase took until 1974–1975. Construction began in 1975 and continued until 1983.

Several distinct techniques give the characteristic image and impact of the building — the successive bay window elevation of the structure, the finer division in height, the rhythm of the structural elements and the prominent decorative columns around the window openings. Its architecture was inspired by the Boston City Hall, which is considered a prominent example of Brutalist architecture. Yet, the building does not fully belong to the flowing open public spaces and egalitarian architecture of post-war Brutalism. Rather, it is an eclectic structure that bears the marks of all the decades in which it was designed, built and completed — the 1960s, 1970s and 1980s. In the formal spaces in the interior, the dark marble and brass details bear similarities with the decoration style of the representative Sofia Largo of the 1950s. Formally, the architectural image repeats characteristic patterns of the post-war modernism of the 1960s but the finishing works and stone cladding bear the high level of demonstrative luxury accepted as the norm in the buildings of the power of the People's Republic of Bulgaria at the time, such as the Boyana Рesidence. The synthesis of architecture with other arts are characteristic of the cultural policies of the second half of the 1970s and throughout the 1980s, as many of the architects, designers and decorators also worked in a number of the most representative contemporary architectural sites of Bulgaria, including the remarkable Buzludzha monument in the Balkan Mountains. Elements of its architecture inspired other public buildings throughout the nation, including in the cities of Vidin, Ruse, Burgas, Pazardzhik and Troyan.

== See also ==
- Government of Bulgaria
- Minister of Foreign Affairs (Bulgaria)
- List of current foreign ministers
- List of foreign ministers in 2023
