= 2013 Bulgarian protests against the first Borisov cabinet =

Civil demonstrations against high bills

2013 Bulgarian protests against the first Borisov cabinet Протести срещу кабинета "Борисов"
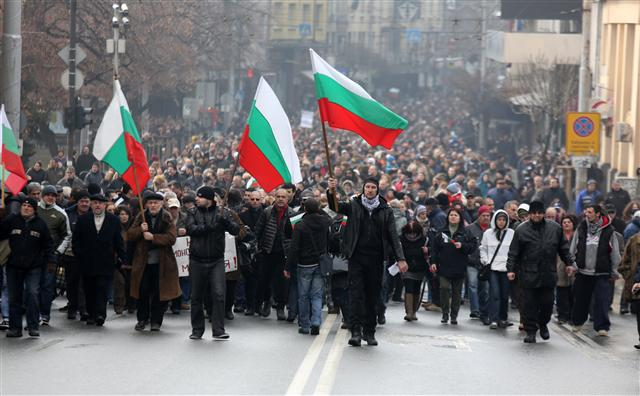
- Protest in Sofia, 17 February 2013
- Date: 28 January 2013 – 16 March 2013
- Location: Bulgaria (main); Austria, France, Germany, Greece, United Kingdom, Spain (Bulgarian diaspora)
- Caused by: Government-granted monopolies; Government austerity measures; Poverty and unemployment; Government corruption; General failure of the democratic system
- Methods: Civil resistance; Demonstrations; Anti-austerity protests; General strikes; Self-immolations
- Result: Resignation of the cabinet; Raykov government takes power; early Parliamentary elections; reductions in energy prices; increase in pensions; government support (41 million leva) for the poorest segments of the population

Number
100,000 (nationwide)	

Casualties
- Deaths: 5
- Injuries: 24
- Arrested: dozens (according to unofficial estimates), 60+ (based on police sources)

The 2013 Bulgarian protests against the first Borisov cabinet were civil demonstrations against high electricity and hot water bills resulting from monopolism in the sphere that began in Blagoevgrad on 28 January 2013, and subsequently spread to over 30 cities in Bulgaria that ended with the resignation of the Boyko Borisov government on 20 February 2013. They were caused by abnormally high electricity bills, but later turned into a mass non-partisan movement against the government and the political system. The events were marked by seven self-immolations (five of them fatal), spontaneous demonstrations and a strong sentiment against political parties.

As a result of the demonstrations, the centre-right government of Boyko Borisov resigned and a caretaker cabinet led by Marin Raykov was appointed. The demands of protesters, however, were not addressed, and demonstrations continued throughout the country, calling for a change of the political model and nationalisation of strategic economic sectors.

== Background ==
Electrical power distribution in Bulgaria was managed by a state-owned monopoly until 2005, when the government sold 67% of it to three foreign power companies - German E.ON, Austrian EVN Group and Czech ČEZ Group. In 2011, E.ON sold its Bulgarian branch to Energo-Pro, a private Czech power company, and on the next year the state sold its stakes in CEZ. EVN, ČEZ and Energo-Pro virtually operate as private regional monopolies whose activities are overseen by the State Commission for Energy and Water Regulation (SCEWR). The state also sold its power distribution infrastructure to these private distributors, thus losing control over the management of profits. The main energy companies are believed to have acquired debts in the four years preceding the demonstrations, which partly contributed to a rather unbalanced situation in the energy sphere. In addition, residents of Sofia have been voicing their concerns for years against the city's district heating provider – Toplofikatsiya Sofia, which has a monopoly on heat distribution in the city. Discontent has been created by very high prices and the fact that the company only reviews readings from customers' calorimetres once a year and the rest of the time it forms bills using "estimates", the complex and allegedly illegal formulas the company uses for calculating the bills and the lack of accountability and the practices of the so-called "heating accountancy firms", which act as middle-men between Toplofikatsiya and its customers.

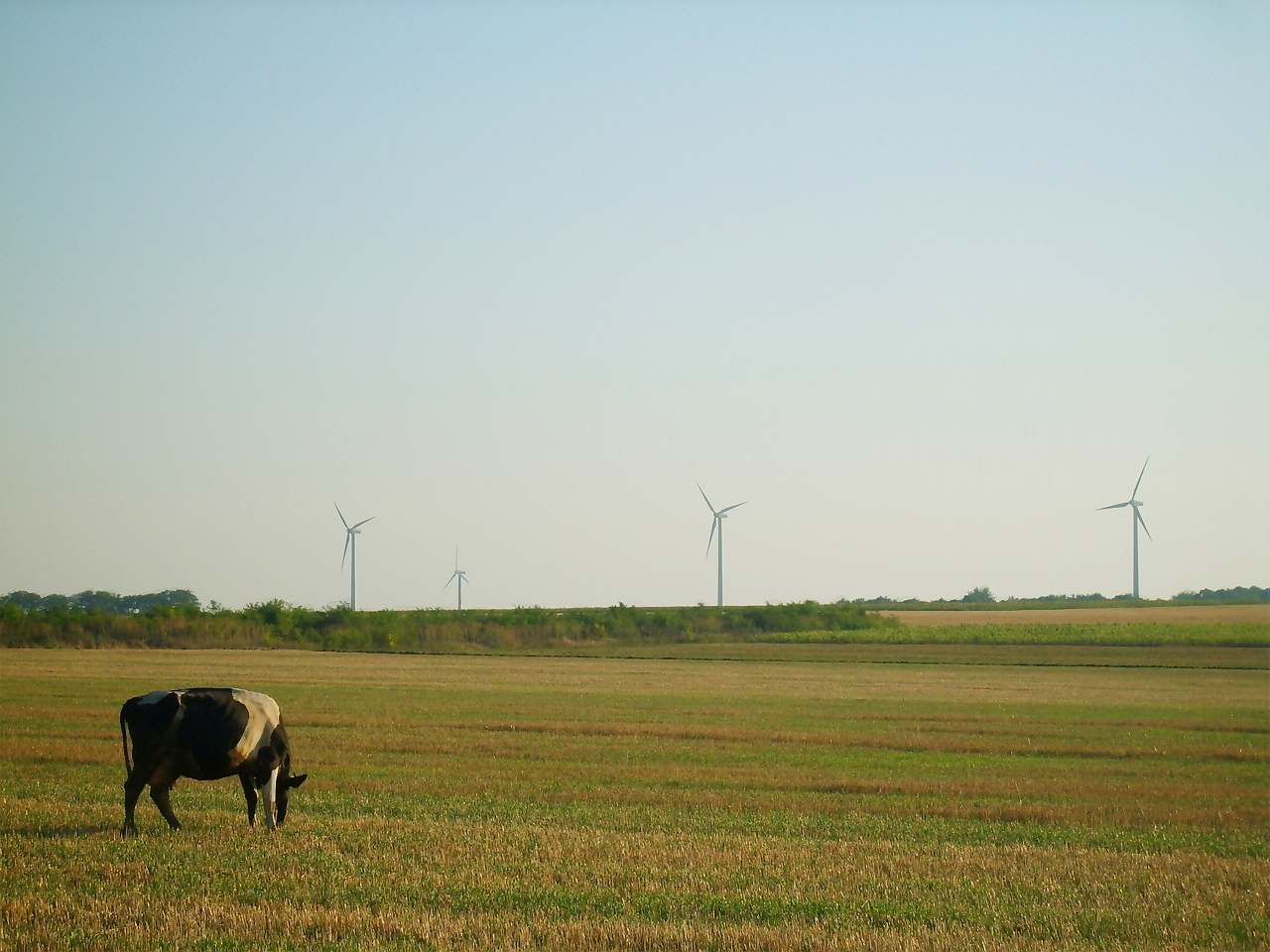
Wind turbines in Tvarditsa, Dobrich Province. Renewable sources satisfy 12 per cent of electricity needs in Bulgaria.

At the same time, Bulgaria has a rapidly expanding renewable energy market. Growth in the sector has surpassed forecasts and has notably increased prices and strain on the electrical grid in the past few years. Investment in wind and solar power installations between 2008 and 2012 in Bulgaria is estimated at more than 4 billion euros, which needs to be repaid by surcharges on electricity prices over the next years. Since 2005, electricity prices for industrial consumers, along with other utilities, have doubled or tripled. In 2011, SCEWR rejected demands by regional monopolies to increase power prices, but a string of severe price spikes occurred in 2012 as a consequence of renewable energy charges. In response, the government drastically cut preferential feed-in tariffs for solar power with 50%, and with 22% for wind power. SCEWR also increased power transmission fees by 50 per cent in an attempt to curb green energy production. These measures led to a drop in electricity exports and withdrawal of investment projects, but prices continued to rise slowly in the following months. Subsequent inflation caused by higher production costs was recorded as the highest for the past four years.

Electricity costs are one of the main expenditures for Bulgarian citizens. Local analysts estimated that with rising living costs, almost 100 per cent of the average Bulgarian household's monthly income would be spent on utilities, food, transportation, healthcare and education. Currently 85 per cent of household monthly incomes are spent on basic necessities. Prices in Bulgaria amount to 49 per cent of the European Union average, At the same time average salaries are the lowest among European Union members at 768 leva (393 euro) for September 2012. The minimum wage is ten times lower than that of some member states, amounting to 310 leva (159 euro), or about 1 euro per hour. Twenty-two per cent of the labour force are employed on a minimum wage. For the past three years, incomes have marked almost no change, while prices have increased significantly. Austerity measures encouraged by the European Union and the International Monetary Fund during the recession have resulted in "catastrophic" social consequences according to the International Trade Union Confederation. The government of Boyko Borisov strictly imposed austerity measures and sustained fiscal stability, but also delayed government payments to private companies, and was criticised for worsening corruption and media freedom indicators, political authoritarianism and general economic stagnation. As a consequence, the support for Borisov and his centre-right Citizens for European Development of Bulgaria (GERB) party has been steadily declining since 2010. A major blow to GERB's popularity came after their decision to cancel the Belene Nuclear Power Plant project, which was believed to be a way to reduce electricity costs and create jobs. Mass protests for political or social causes are relatively uncommon in Bulgaria, but have become more frequent since 2007, when the issue of the preservation of Strandzha Mountain nature areas came to the forefront.

== Escalation ==
=== Initial phase ===
In late January 2013, protests occurred in Blagoevgrad after consumers received electricity bills that were two times higher than those for the previous month. Protesters symbolically burned their bills. A protester explained that her bill amounted to 310 leva, of which only 128 leva were for electricity consumption and the remainder were various tariffs and taxes. Some of the earliest protests also took place in Sandanski.

On 10 February, demonstrations occurred in Sofia, Plovdiv, Varna, Burgas, Ruse, Veliko Tarnovo, Shumen, Blagoevgrad, Sandanski, Silistra, Yambol, Gotse Delchev, Belene, Montana, Pazardjik, Dobrich and Kardzhali. The same day, two EVN utility vehicles were set ablaze in Plovdiv. Demonstrators in Sofia gathered in front of the Ministry of Economy, Energy and Tourism and threw snowballs at minister Delyan Dobrev. One protester was stabbed in Varna on 13 February 2013. The authorities of Kranevo also voiced discontent at the electricity prices, after communal services costs almost doubled in comparison to the same period of the previous year. The mayor of Kranevo said that his village was not an exception, and most localities in the municipality had the same issues.

By mid-February tens of thousands of people were on the streets, demanding nationalisation of the private regional monopolies, removal of subcontractors, assigning traffic and distribution to NEK EAD (the state-owned power distribution company), declassifying all contracts between the state and energy companies and more liberal combined heat and power usage laws, among others. On 17 February, a fictitious declaration supposedly written by the three foreign power companies and dismissing the protester demands while calling on them to accept their own responsibility for the situation that had transpired, was circulated in the social media and caused further anger against the energy providers. According to analysts, in the initial phase of the demonstrations, more than 50% of the discontent was fuelled by the supposed abuses of the monopol companies, with only 15% traceable to anti-government feelings.

=== Anti-government movement ===
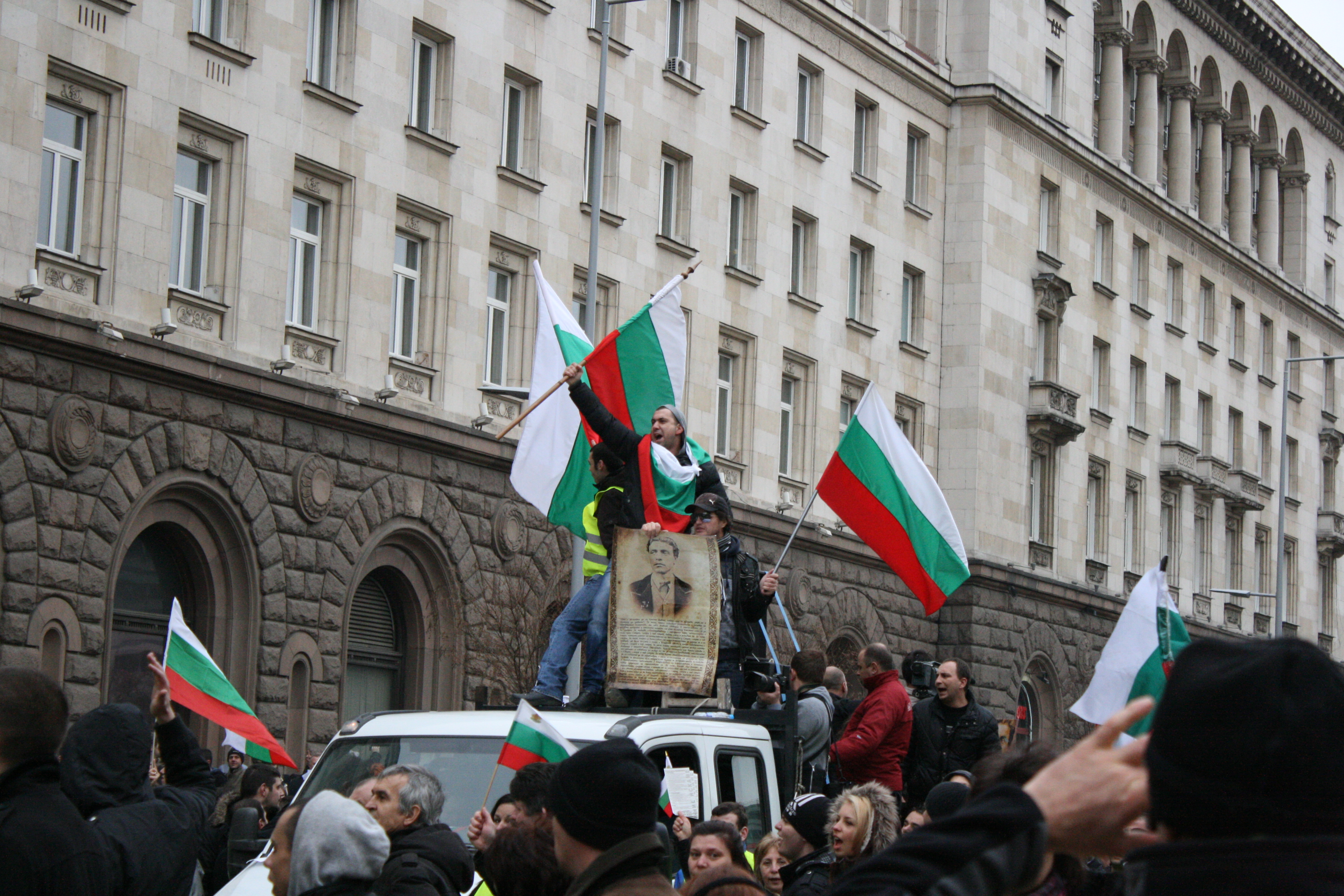
Protesters in front of the Presidential Palace carrying flags and a portrait of Vasil Levski

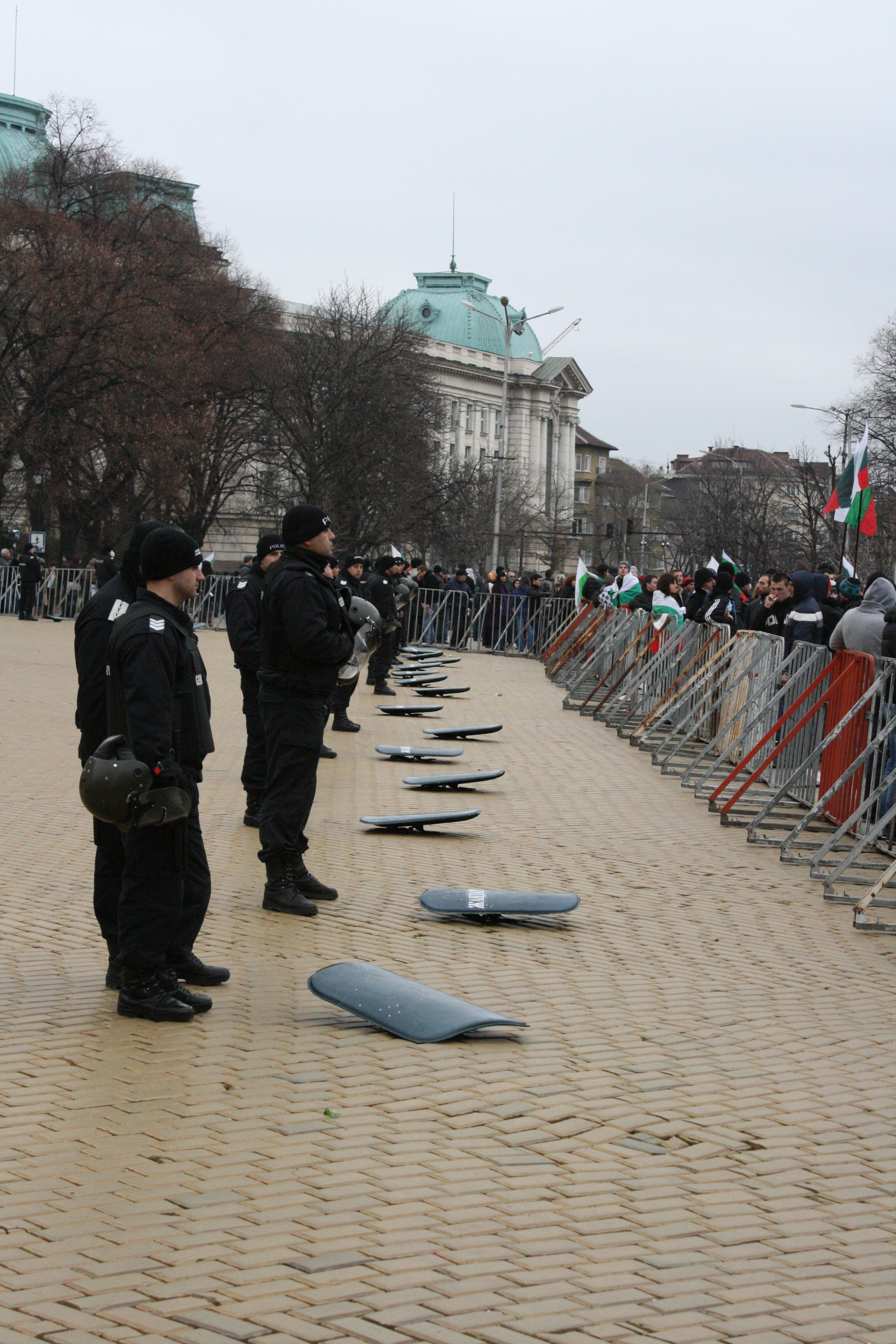
Riot police in front of the National Assembly, shields down in a sign of solidarity with the protests

On 17 February, a national demonstration against monopolies gathered 10,000 people in Plovdiv, 8,000 (up to 30,000 by other estimates) in Varna and a smaller number in other cities. In total, 100,000 people protested all over the country in 35 cities and towns. Key motorways and transport routes in the country were blocked; rocks, bottles and eggs were thrown against Gendarmerie units, the Ministry of Economy and the National Assembly in the capital. People chanted "mafia" and "resignation", and carried slogans such as "This is not a protest, it's a process - the struggle for a new Bulgaria", "Down with GERB" and "Janissaries, the end is coming". They gave the government one more week to respond to their demands. Clashes occurred near ČEZ's headquarters in Sofia.

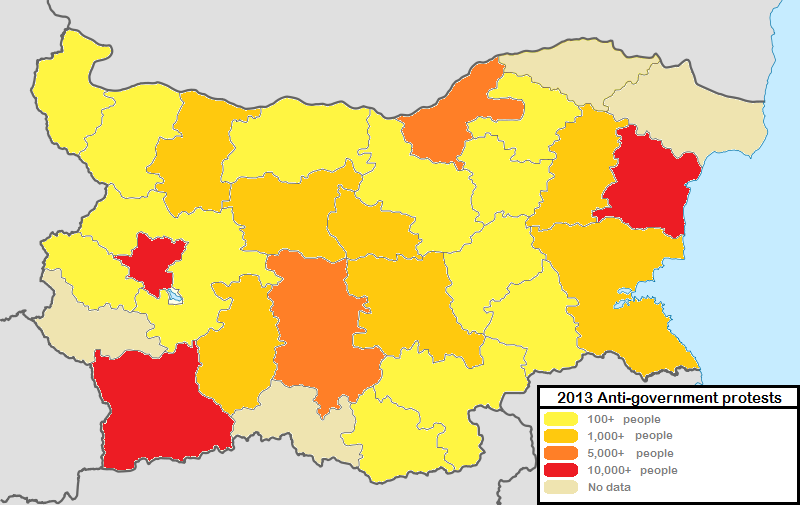
Map of protest activity peaks by oblast. Regions in red saw the largest number of people on the streets, lighter colours show smaller demonstrations.

Some media sources and protesters have used the term "Bulgarian Spring" as a moniker for the demonstrations.

On 18 February mass demonstrations continued all over the country. In Sofia, they escalated into civil resistance and protesters attempted to attack the National Assembly. The crowds were pushed back to Eagles' Bridge (the starting point of the protest), and after their demands to begin immediate talks with government representatives remained unanswered, they moved towards the National Palace of Culture. Clashes with police and Gendarmerie units on Hristo Botev boulevard left two police officers injured and six patrol vehicles were damaged. Eleven people were arrested. In Veliko Tarnovo, one man set himself on fire and later died in a hospital. The same day Boyko Borisov dismissed finance minister Simeon Dyankov, although this did not reduce public tensions. Dyankov was unpopular among the population because of his abrupt manners and strong insistence on austerity. According to some commentators, football fans gradually started to dominate the demonstrations and contributed to their escalation by steering them in a chaotic and violent direction.

On the same date, around 30 people led by members of the "No to the EU" coalition (Bulgarian: Коалиция "Не на ЕС") gathered in Sofia and burned a European Union flag, protesting against the EU's supposed discriminatory treatment of Bulgarians and its "toleration of the ethnic minorities in the country", expressing the sentiment that the country needs to exit the economic and political union.

On 19 February, which marked 140 years of national hero Vasil Levski's execution, violent clashes between protesters and police occurred in Sofia. Seven people, including two Gendarmerie officers, were injured during a police charge on protesters at Eagles' Bridge. 25 people were arrested, with the four minors among them quickly released. According to eyewitness accounts, a group of around 20 hooded provocateurs inflamed the situation by throwing firecrackers and rocks at police officers. In the ensuing commotion, the police is alleged to have retaliated against peaceful protest participants. Some pundits have made claims that the agent provocateurs were actually doing GERB's bidding, with the heads of police and the Interior Ministry deliberately attempting to spark a confrontation. President Rosen Plevneliev was booed at during his speech at the Levski Monument. For the first time in history civilians were not allowed to lay flowers at the site. The number of demonstrators in Varna was around 8,000.

On 20 February, on the 11th day of the protests, Boyko Borisov announced that his cabinet would resign, expressing shock due to the violent scenes between protesters and police that he had witnessed and stating that he would never feel comfortable remaining in charge when there is such tension between regular citizens and police. The resignation was put to a vote in Parliament on the next morning, with 209 MPs voting "for" and 5 "against". A rally gathered in front of the Parliament building in support of Borisov and his government during the debates. Information surfaced in the media that the rally was staged, although GERB's press centre denied the allegations. Borisov expressed gratitude to his sympathizers, but also requested them to discontinue further demonstrations, so that social harmony is not compromised.

According to analysis conducted by the information agency BGNES, Borisov is the first Bulgarian prime minister (since Zhan Videnov in 1997) to step down due to hunger fuelled discontent and protests related to the general state of the economy.

The assessments of political scientists and sociologists regarding Borisov's choice to relinquish power have been mixed. Evgeniy Daynov was critical, maintaining that the timing and the way in which Borisov went about his decision were ill-chosen, creating the impression of a weak and indecisive leader in addition to allowing him to refrain from addressing potentially valid demands. Others such as Kantcho Stoychev characterized it as the only correct and wise move given the difficult circumstances and were optimistic regarding Borisov's chances to retain his influence in politics and continue to work for the betterment of the country. Boriana Dimitrova and other analysts emphasized that Borisov's resignation was reflective of a good intuitive reading of the situation and caught analysts, political parties and even the protesters themselves by surprise, with the forces in opposition suffering from their own legitimacy issues which would make them ill-equipped to provide quick solutions to the systemic crisis. In Nikolov's contention, the stepping down of Borisov essentially turned the social crisis into a political one. Klisarov has ascribed more cynical motives to Borisov's quick resignation, viewing it largely as a matter of preserving GERB's power base and the particized status quo.

Throughout the crisis Borisov retained the support of the European People's Party and he was endorsed by them for the 2013 parliamentary elections.

=== Post-resignation actions ===
Initiative committees by citizens form around the country. On 23 February coordinators of demonstrations gathered in Sliven to discuss further actions after the resignation of the government. Several members of different political parties who were present at the gathering were expelled. Demands for a change of the political system, a ban on all political parties in power, abolishment of value added tax on electricity production and state ownership of natural resources and strategic sectors were added to the original calls for nationalisation of the power companies. TIM, a semi-legal company, was reported to have organised a crackdown on an initiative committee gathering in Varna. Protesters holding banners against TIM are alleged to have been beaten, with the police choosing not to intervene. The "Rakovski Legion", an organisation of military officers and supporters of the Bulgarian Army, have joined the protests.

International demonstrations occurred 24 February in all major Bulgarian cities, as well as in Vienna, Munich, Paris, London, Barcelona, Düsseldorf, Frankfurt, Athens, Berlin, Madrid, Dublin and many other major cities all over the world, where the Bulgarian diaspora gathered in front of the Bulgarian embassies and consulates. IMRO leaders organized a march in the capital on that day and joined the demonstrations. President Rosen Plevneliev met with some of the protesters in Sofia and was presented with a list of demands. Non-mainstream nationalist organizations such as the Bulgarian National Front (Bulgarian: Български Национален Фронт) and Bulgarian National Union (Bulgarian: Български национален съюз) have also been supportive of the demonstrations, while sharply distancing themselves from what they view as anti-patriotic entities such as the Open Institute and the Bulgarian Helsinki Committee. The protest wave subsequently continued, albeit with a lower intensity.

Gatherings of citizen committees were scheduled to move to Plovdiv in response to Interior Minister in resignation Tsvetan Tsvetanov's accusations that protest leaders belong to organised crime and drug smuggling circles. Yanko Petrov, a protest coordinator, explained in an interview that members of the committees expect to be framed for drug distribution by the authorities. Borisov has been critical of the role played by BSP and MRF during the protests, believing them to have made use of the discontent among the poor in order to topple his government. He has also expressed disappointment with some of the media, who had allegedly been overly praiseworthy of him (in order to be able to discredit him with the European Union by creating the false impression that they were under his control) before changing their tune. Borisov also revealed that the protests against his government may have been a factor in the postponement of Bulgaria's entry into the Schengen Area.

In late February 2013, doctors and medical personnel also voiced dissatisfaction, demanding an urgent meeting with Rosen Plevneliev, due to the limits on their freedom to practice their occupation and see patients that had been imposed by the National Health Insurance Fund (NHIF).

In March 2013, Sergei Stanishev accused the Borisov government of monitoring the e-mail accounts and text messages of the protest leaders.

On 4 March, a protest tent city was erected in front of the National Parliament by some of the Eagles' Bridge protesters.

The early elections did not bring about political stability or increased trust in the political institutions of the country. By the end of July 2013, anti-government protesters but this time against the new government of Plamen Oresharski were still out in force, protesting peacefully in Sofia, with Reuters recording the 24 July 2013 as the 41st straight day of peaceful protests. The protesters were demanding the resignation of the Socialist-led government of Oresharski and more than 100 lawmakers, ministers and journalists spent the night besieged inside parliament before police evacuated them. Boyko Borisov returned to power as Prime Minister in November 2014 after his party won the 2014 Bulgarian parliamentary election, forming a coalition government.

== Public reactions to the protests ==
While the anti-monopoly and anti-austerity protests enjoyed a high degree of popular support (with over 90% of Bulgarian citizens expressing approval of them in a Gallup poll prior to Borisov's resignation and 77% lauding them in a summer 2013 poll administered by the same company), there was less of a consensus regarding the exact culpability of the Borisov cabinet, with 47% demanding that Boyko Borisov stepped down and 39% believing that he did not need to tender his resignation. Alpha Research provided figures suggesting an even greater parity in viewpoints, with 50% approving of Borisov's resignation and 47% disagreeing with the Prime Minister's decision. As a result of this, public enthusiasm for continued demonstrations remained high (around 70%) in the aftermath of Borisov's announcement that he did not intend to stay on. Alpha Research (in its regular survey administered in the period between 22 March and 27 March), confirmed that over 90% of Bulgarians declare support for economically-oriented demands (though only about 20% would be inclined to back up manifestly political ones). Accordingly, a higher proportion of respondents - 67% - credited the protests for bringing about economic changes (like the reduction in electricity prices), with the number of those well-disposed towards the political transformations as a result of the demonstrations (such as the preliminary elections) a lower one - 47%. 55% expressed full approval for the "voice of the street", while 38% were partially supportive of street protests. 14% of Bulgarian citizens affirmed that they would cast their vote for a "protest party".

Surveys generally indicated a higher support for the anti-monopoly protests among younger people in the smaller cities, as opposed to those in Sofia or Plovdiv. Varna constituted the major exception, with the protests labeled by Anna Krasteva as the Varna Spring.

Young people as well as the age cohorts between 30-44 and 45-59 constituted a substantial percentage of those who took part in the protest marches. Elderly people were much more visible in the ranks of the protesters in comparison to previous demonstrations for environmental causes. People with primary or no education were almost absent during the protest activities. Self-identified BSP and MRF sympathizers did not have a significant presence at the demonstrations, with 3.5% and 3.3% respectively declaring to have participated in them. 7.45% of self-described GERB supporters were at some point in the streets during the protest activities (presumably only in the initial anti-monopoly phase of the demonstrations). Members of the nationalist Attack had an active involvement in the demonstrations.

Even though the February crisis has been described as "an element in the political strategy of BSP", in the immediate aftermath of the protests, electoral support for GERB actually went up (in part due to increased consolidation within the party and mobilization of its voters), with the most recent party in governance increasing its lead over BSP in comparison to the standings in January. The Attack benefited the most as a result of the accumulated protest potential, raising its electoral appeal from 1.9% to 5.5%.

== Political events ==
The Prime Minister Boyko Borisov resigned in response to the protests.

On 6 March 2013, mayor of Varna, Kiril Yordanov, also announced his resignation, triggered by the anti-government protest wave in general and the self-immolation of Plamen Goranov in particular. The government (while still formally in charge of the country) declared 6 March to be a day of national mourning.

President Rosen Plevneliev was tasked with giving a mandate to one of the major political parties to form a caretaker government. GERB, the Socialist Party and the Movement for Rights and Freedoms returned the mandate. Early elections became scheduled to take place on 12 May 2013. The caretaker government under Marin Raykov assumed power on 13 March, on the same day in which the date for the early elections was set. It attracted criticism from the Attack party, which questioned its impartiality, regarding it as an instrument of GERB that could help hide any evidence of the former governing party's alleged abuses of power. Businessman and direct democracy proponent Petar Klisarov labeled the Raykov government as "GERB's "B" team".

In March 2013, Rosen Plevneliev approached protest organizers to form a public advisory body that would operate together with the caretaker government, but there was a breakdown in the talks. Plevneliev and the main political parties have been blamed by some sources for allegedly only feigning interest in the protesters' concerns and not acting to change the electoral rules prior to the Parliament's dissolution.

On 16 March, a number of the protesters established the political movement "Liberation" (Bulgarian: политическо движение "Освобождение") with the intention of taking part in the upcoming elections.

In the Parliamentary election in May, all major parties, especially the ruling GERB, received a severe blow (despite obtaining the highest number of popular votes and seats in the National Assembly), with the notable exception of the Socialist Party, which got a major boost in both votes and seats. Due to GERB's political isolation and what Borisov characterized as "his unwillingness to take part in unprincipled coalitions", the party did not attempt to form a government by subjecting its chosen cabinet to a vote in the National Assembly and the president passed on the baton to BSP. The citizen energy generated as a result of the February protests did not lead to a high voter turnout and the election campaign is evaluated as having remained largely insulated from the protests, with no political movement incorporating a significant number of protester demands emerging as an electoral challenger.

Leading figures of the party Bulgaria Without Censorship (Bulgarian: "България без цензура"), which was officially established on 25 January 2014, have made statements suggesting that the majority of the February protesters eventually flocked to them. Angel Slavchev, dubbed as one of the "faces of the February demonstrations", started his own show on the News7 channel, which was regarded as closely affiliated with Barekov's party. Slavchev also took part in the 2014 European elections on the ticket of Barekov's party, though he is no longer affiliated with BWS after criticizing the party leader and being expelled in July 2014.

== Repercussions in the energy sector ==
On the day before its resignation, the government announced that it would revoke ČEZ's licence. Following the statement, the Bulgarian Stock Exchange suspended trading in the shares of ČEZ and its subordinate companies. The company's shares declined for several consecutive days on the Prague Stock Exchange. In early March 2013, mayor Rositsa Yanakieva revealed that 288 separate lawsuits against ČEZ (pertaining to disputes surrounding the ownership of power substations) had been filed by the Pernik municipality.

Two weeks after the government announced its resignation (but before it had taken effect), the Electricity Systems Operator announced that the total energy production in the country was estimated at well below 50% of the full capacity, with the country's second-largest power station, the Varna TPP, having been completely shut down. This was surprising for people who had been paying high bills.

A week later, the energy minister Delyan Dobrev revealed that energy contracts signed by previous governments in 2002 and 2005 contained secret clauses about the construction and exploitation of the Maritza East 1 and Maritza East 3 power stations, totalling over 13 billion BGN (nearly 7 billion euro). Dobrev said that, according to the clauses, the American companies AES and ContourGlobal, which own the power stations, would receive a guaranteed minimum monthly sum of money from customers, whether they were using electricity or not. On 14 November 2013, the Commission for Energy and Water Regulation (Bulgarian: Комисия за енергийно и водно регулиране) discontinued the procedure of revoking the license of ČEZ Electro Bulgaria.

Many of the problems in the energy sector that triggered the protests remain unsolved as of September 2014. National Electric Company continues to accumulate deficits, demanding further rises in the consumer prices of electricity. A large part of the NEC deficit comes from the long-term contracts of renewable energy producers and AES Maritza East 1.

== Effects on political protests outside of Bulgaria ==
The wave of government change from Bulgaria went as far as Slovenia, where the government was forced to resign as a result of similar protests by the Slovenian people affected by the Slovenian government austerity measures. At the end of February demonstrations against high electricity prices occurred in Estonia, following the Bulgarian example.

== Analysis and political commentary ==
The demonstrations have been characterized as an authentic expression of the desperation of the less affluent Bulgarians, to a large extent motivated by feelings of absolute and relative deprivation and as being dominated by socially oriented demands, associated with the traditional left. While some analysts have labeled them a "revolt of the poor", others have regarded the people from the middle class social stratum (specifically the now defunct citizen movement "Power" (Bulgarian: гражданско движение СИЛА), members of which had organized demonstrations in Sandanski and Blagoevgrad, as the driving force behind the early unrest. Politician Edvin Sugarev has criticized a number of media sources, especially Bivol, for publishing unproven information about Borisov's alleged links with the Ministry of the Interior's CSBOP (Bulgarian: ЦСБОП), where the Prime Minister is purported to have worked as an informer (his file was supposedly called the "Buda dossier"), which he sees as having played a pivotal role in the radicalization of the protest by turning the anger away from the monopolism of energy companies and against Borisov. He compared the situation to the atmosphere in January 1997 (but this time with BSP reaping dividends from it), an opinion shared by Evgeniy Daynov who also drew parallels with the 1990 protests in terms of the volatility of the situation. According to the French ambassador to Bulgaria, Philippe Autié, the protests stemmed from a lack of sufficient trust in the political class and Bulgarian elites as in general as well as the ability of "private and non-transparent stakeholders" to frequently hijack and negatively affect the post-1989 transition processes. Political scientist Vasil Garnizov similarly regards the protests as reflective of the widespread societal sentiment that there is something wrong when it comes to the political and economic structuring of society (as well as the links between the political and economic spheres) - this attitude is thought to have been pervasive since the early 1990s. The need for increased citizen control over political decision-making has also been identified as a key (but sometimes forgotten) demand of the protest movement. Parvan Simeonov sees the fall-out from the February protests as in indication that the second Bulgarian party system after 1989 (the charismatic one that followed the bipolar model of the 1990s), which began with Simeon Saxe-Coburg-Gotha and continued with Borisov, has now come to an end. In the view of political anthropologist and journalist Dostena Lavern, the February demonstrations were an indication that "Bulgaria is fully on track to reach an equalization of its social and political realities with those of the other EU countries", with the protest motivations linked to EU-wide negative trends such as the threat posed by financial neoliberalism to the democratic fundamentals of countries (in both Eastern and Western Europe). Economist Georgi Angelov from the Sofia Open Society Institute, commenting on the situation one day prior to Borisov's resignation, explained that the country's stability on the global financial markets and bankruptcy indicators have not been seriously affected due to the protests.

In addition to the lack of unity issues among the protest leaders (believed to have played a part in discrediting them with citizens), in part exemplified by the split between the "green" and the "other" protesters, as well as their limited familiarity with politics, some commentators have criticized the supposed prominence in the media of leftist spokespeople for the demonstrators and the demand for the creation of a system without political parties, viewing it as unrealistic and non-constructive as well as likely to encourage the promotion of non-democratic ideas, akin to the councils that had been implemented in the Soviet Union. According to Daniel Smilov and Toni Nikolov, in the aftermath of Borisov's resignation, a political power vacuum and an escalation of anti-party sentiments persisted for a short while, with party leaders largely removing themselves from the public sphere. In that moment in time the think tanks, non-governmental organizations and their networks are gauged to have been the only actors willing to speak up in defense of the constitutional system of governance and party democracy.

Former Bulgarian Prime Minister Ivan Kostov insists that both the February demonstrations and the subsequent anti-Oresharski ones remained relatively ineffective due to the lacking political leadership in their ranks. Also, from a utilitarian standpoint, a very limited number of the protester demands are believed to have been achieved seven months after Borisov's resignation - 17 out of 20 issues raised by the protesters are thought not to have been tackled in full or in part by the relevant political actors. Antoniy Galabov maintains that while the initial demonstrations were against high utility bills, with the implicit hope that Borisov could rectify the situation, the protests were subsequently taken over by new participants with a different profile, often driven by corporate interests. The demonstrators' demands are believed to have become overly abstract, with the finger being pointed at the whole political system and the nature of the democratic transition; this is thought to have essentially forced all the mainstream parties to incorporate populism into their platforms in order to portray themselves as allies of the people on the streets. Political scientist Deyan Kyuranov regards the initial preeminence of economic grievances as a particular strength of the protest, but believes that the protesters were ill-advised to attempt change the focal point in the direction of a political demonstration and thus caused the collapse of what started off as a promising popular movement. A number of analysts have also subscribed to the viewpoint that the accusations levelled against GERB (for its supposed authoritarianism and violation of democratic norms) have been without sufficient merit and the party was not even close to creating a state within a state during Borisov's time in power. According to a report generated by the "Media Democracy" foundation, the general coverage of the demonstrations by the major media outlets (even those previously considered to be favourable to the Borisov administration) was almost universally pro-protest, with the main media's nature of reporting turning markedly against the government on 17 February. Despite the calls for greater accountability in politics during the course of the protests, leadership hierarchies and inner party consensus within BSP and GERB are believed to have become more entrenched in the months following the end of the demonstrations, with the status quo parties never facing a serious challenge as a result of the demonstrations. The Internet is believed to have played an important role when it comes to many aspects of the protest movement, and its effectiveness is believed to have been bolstered by the "media revolution" in Bulgaria, as evidenced by the increased prominence of online newspapers, on-site reporting by protest leaders as well as a tendency to treat platforms such as Facebook news as primary sources of information.

== Conspiracy theories ==
A minority of anti-protest commentators have taken the stance that the demonstrations were orchestrated by pro-Russian circles in order to bring down the Borisov government (seen as unfavourable to Russian energy interests and Russian lobbies in Bulgaria as a whole) and from the very beginning had an explicitly political dimension. They note that the most intense protests largely subsided after Borisov's resignation even though the economic demands remained mostly unaddressed. The role of the Bulgarian Socialist Party in hijacking the protests has also been emphasized. Such pundits tend to characterize the February demonstrations as a coup attempt with the alleged heavy involvement of pro-communist activists, because of the Russophilic sentiments of some of the informal leaders of the protests. In subsequent interviews, some of the leading figures behind the February demonstrations such as Yanko Petrov, Doncho Dudev and Yoanna Ivanova countered the allegations of a major shift in the direction of the protest in an anti-Borisov fashion by claiming that the largest protest аctivities actually occurred in the aftermath of Borisov's resignation (with the anti-monopoly sentiments remaining key) and emphasizing that the three of them were also active in demonstrating against Delyan Peevski's short-lived DANS appointment by the Oresharski government.

== See also ==
- 2013–14 Bulgarian protests against the Oresharski cabinet
- 2013 Bulgarian nuclear power referendum
- 2013 Bulgarian self-immolations
- 2013 Bulgarian parliamentary election
- 2020–2021 Bulgarian protests
- 2025 Bulgarian budget protests
- List of protests in the 21st century

== Bibliography ==
=== Books ===
- Daynov, Evgeniy (2013). Варварите. Управлението на ГЕРБ (2009-2013) (1st ed.). Sofia: Милениум. ISBN 978-954-515-213-9.
- Daynov, Evgeniy (2017). Записки по революцията (1997-2017), том 3 (1st ed.). Sofia: Ера. ISBN 978-954-389-450-5.
- Kanev, Dobrin; Todorov, Antoniy, eds. (2014). Качество на демокрацията в България (1st ed.). Sofia: Изток-Запад. ISBN 978-619-152-473-0. Archived from the original on 21 November 2015.
- Klisarov, Petar (2014). Огледало на протестите 2013-2014 (1st ed.). Sofia: Изток-Запад. ISBN 978-619-152-484-6.
- Kozhouharov, Kantcho (2014). Превратът срещу ГЕРБ и войната срещу демокрацията (1st ed.). Sofia: Лингея. ISBN 978-954-92471-7-6.
- Lilov, Grigor (2013). Най-богатите българи (1st ed.). Sofia: "Кайлас" ЕООД. ISBN 978-954-92098-9-1.
- Nikolov, Toni (2015). Пропуканата България - Записки по суматохата (1st ed.). Sofia: Хермес. ISBN 978-954-26141-8-0.
- Smilov, Daniel; Vaysova, Lea, eds. (2013). #Протестът. Анализи и позиции в българската преса. Лято 2013 (1st ed.). Sofia: Изток-Запад. ISBN 978-619-152-351-1. Archived from the original on 22 February 2014.
- Sugarev, Edvin (2013a). Подлите времена (2nd ed.). Sofia: Изток-Запад. ISBN 978-619-152-291-0. Archived from the original on 2 April 2015.

=== Articles and book excerpts ===
- Dareva, Velislava (24 June 2013). Бунтът на ситите. In Smilov, Daniel; Vaysova, Lea (eds.). Протестът. Анализи и позиции в българската преса. Лято 2013. Изток-Запад. pp. 169–171. ISBN 978-619-152-351-1.
- Galabov, Antoniy (24 June 2013). Атака" говори на висок глас това, което БСП мисли. In Smilov, Daniel; Vaysova, Lea (eds.). Протестът. Анализи и позиции в българската преса. Лято 2013. Изток-Запад. pp. 398–400. ISBN 978-619-152-351-1.
- Kabakchieva, Petya (24 June 2013). Да мислим от позицията на младите. In Smilov, Daniel; Vaysova, Lea (eds.). Протестът. Анализи и позиции в българската преса. Лято 2013. Изток-Запад. pp. 444–448. ISBN 978-619-152-351-1.
- Popov, Yulian (24 June 2013). От блоговете: 7 причини за това защо изборите не проработиха и ще трябва да се повторят. In Smilov, Daniel; Vaysova, Lea (eds.). Протестът. Анализи и позиции в българската преса. Лято 2013. Изток-Запад. pp. 458–459. ISBN 978-619-152-351-1.
- Prodanov, Vasil (28 June 2013). Протестите: нова битка на дясното срещу лявото. In Smilov, Daniel; Vaysova, Lea (eds.). Протестът. Анализи и позиции в българската преса. Лято 2013. Изток-Запад. pp. 231–234. ISBN 978-619-152-351-1.
- Yanakiev, Kalin (5 August 2013). Отново <<комунисти>>. In Smilov, Daniel; Vaysova, Lea (eds.). Протестът. Анализи и позиции в българската преса. Лято 2013. Изток-Запад. pp. 195–199. ISBN 978-619-152-351-1.
- Zarkova, Anna (11 July 2013). Полицаите като герои на протеста. In Smilov, Daniel; Vaysova, Lea (eds.). Протестът. Анализи и позиции в българската преса. Лято 2013. Изток-Запад. pp. 344–346. ISBN 978-619-152-351-1.

=== Interviews (published), political commentaries and public declarations ===
- Boyadzhiev, Tsocho (16 July 2013). Фотография и протест. In Smilov, Daniel; Vaysova, Lea (eds.). Протестът. Анализи и позиции в българската преса. Лято 2013. Изток-Запад. pp. 124–131. ISBN 978-619-152-351-1.
- Garnizov, Vasil (15 July 2013). Протестът дава шанс да се изгради нов институционален ред (интервю на Слав Оков). In Smilov, Daniel; Vaysova, Lea (eds.). Протестът. Анализи и позиции в българската преса. Лято 2013. Изток-Запад. pp. 137–145. ISBN 978-619-152-351-1.
- Simeonov, Parvan (26 June 2013). Политически самоубийства. In Smilov, Daniel; Vaysova, Lea (eds.). Протестът. Анализи и позиции в българската преса. Лято 2013. Изток-Запад. pp. 426–427. ISBN 978-619-152-351-1.
- Sugarev, Edvin (2013). Отворено писмо на Едвин Сугарев, с което обявява гладна стачка. In Smilov, Daniel; Vaysova, Lea (eds.). Протестът. Анализи и позиции в българската преса. Лято 2013. Изток-Запад. pp. 105–108. ISBN 978-619-152-351-1.

=== Opinion polls ===
- Галъп (1 August 2013). Данни на Галъп. In Smilov, Daniel; Vaysova, Lea (eds.). Протестът. Анализи и позиции в българската преса. Лято 2013. Изток-Запад. pp. 323–324. ISBN 978-619-152-351-1.
