= First Borisov Government =

Government of Bulgaria (2009–2013)

- 90th Cabinet of Bulgaria

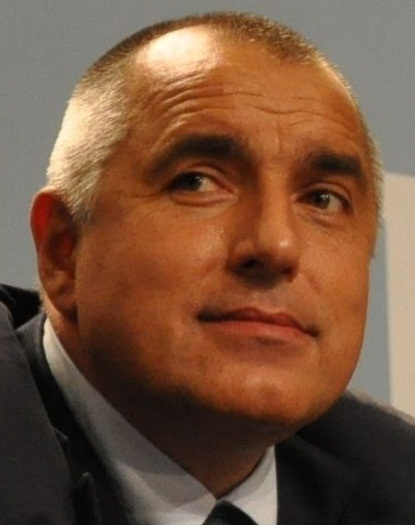
- Date formed: 27 July 2009
- Date dissolved: 13 March 2013

People and organisations
- Head of state: Georgi Parvanov (2009–2012); Rosen Plevneliev (2012–2013)
- Head of government: Boyko Borisov
- Deputy head of government: See list: Tsvetan Tsvetanov (Interior) Simeon Djankov (Finance)
- Member party: GERB
- Status in legislature: Minority Government

History
- Incoming formation: Government formation
- Outgoing formation: Resignation
- Election: 2009
- Legislature term: 41st National Assembly
- Predecessor: Stanishev Government
- Successor: Raykov Government (Provisional)

The ninetieth Cabinet of Bulgaria (in office from July 27, 2009, to March 13, 2013) was a minority government chaired by Boyko Borisov. The government was formed after Borisov's party, GERB, won the 2009 parliamentary election. It remained in power relying on support from the opposition parties for almost four years before resigning following nationwide protests.

== Cabinet ==
=== Original Composition ===
Ministry	Minister	Party
Prime Minister	Boyko Borisov	GERB
Deputy Prime Minister and Minister of Interior	Tsvetan Tsvetanov	GERB
Deputy Prime Minister and Minister of Finance	Simeon Djankov	Independent
Minister of Foreign affairs	Rumiana Jeleva	GERB
Ministry of Education, Youth and Science	Yordanka Fandakova	GERB
Minister of Justice	Margarita Popova	GERB
Minister of Defence	Nickolay Mladenov	GERB
Minister of Economy, Energy and Tourism	Traycho Traykov	Independent
Minister of Labor and Social Policy	Totyu Mladenov	GERB
Ministry of Agriculture and Food	Miroslav Naydenov	GERB
Minister of Regional Development and Public Works	Rosen Plevneliev	Independent
Ministry of Transport, Information Technology and Communications	Aleksandar Tsvetkov	GERB
Minister of Environment and Water	Nona Karadzhova	GERB
Minister of Health	Bozhidar Nanev	GERB
Ministry of Culture	Vezhdi Rashidov	GERB
Minister of Physical Education and Sports	Svilen Neykov	GERB
Minister without Portfolio (Note: Responsible for Bulgarian citizens abroad.)	Bozhidar Dimitrov	GERB

=== Changes in November, 2009 ===
Following the election of Yordanka Fandakova as mayor of Sofia, she was released from the post of Minister of Education and Science on November 19, 2013. She was replaced by Sergei Ignatov, her former Deputy Minister.

=== Changes in 2010 ===
==== Changes in January ====
Following the resignation of Rumiana Jeleva from the post of Minister of Foreign Affairs the following cabinet shuffle took place on January 27:

- Incumbent Minister of Defence, Nickolay Mladenov, was moved to Foreign Affairs.
- Anyu Angelov, former Deputy, was promoted to Minister of Defense.

==== Changes in March ====
On the 18th of March Tomislav Donchev was appointed Minister without portfolio, responsible to administer the relief funds from the European Union.

==== Changes in April ====
On the 21st of April Anna-Maria Borisova (an independent up to that point) was appointed Minister of Health after the dismissal of Bozhidar Nanev.

==== Changes in September ====
On September 29 the most recent addition to cabinet, Borisova, resigns, and is succeeded by Stefan Konstantinov.

==== Changes in December ====
On December 20, Bozhidar Dimitrov tenders his resignation, effective February 4, 2011. No successor was chosen.

=== Changes in 2011 ===
==== Changes in May ====
Aleksandar Tsvetkov resigned from his post on May 18 and was succeeded by Ivaylo Moskovski.

==== Changes in September ====
Having won his party's nomination for the 2011 presidential election three days earlier, Rosen Plevneliev resigned as Minister of Regional Development and Public Works on September 7. He was replaced by Lilyana Pavlova. Margarita Popova, having been nominated for candidate for vice-president for the election, stepped down from her position as Minister of Justice. On November 30, Diana Kovacheva was approved by the National Assembly to take up her portfolio.

=== Changes in March, 2012 ===
On 21 March the Minister of Economy and Energy, Traycho Traykov, resigned. He was replaced by Delyan Dobrev.

Minister of Health Stefan Konstantinov, who was being criticized by his own party for failing to deal with the increase in drug prices, resigns. Konstantinov, defending himself, said that the lack of support from the ruling party was impeding the implementation of reforms that he claims were leading to improved healthcare. Desislava Atanasova was his chosen successor.

=== Changes in January 2013 ===
On January 28, 2013, the Prime Minister fired Sergei Ignatov after a review on the Bulgarian National Science fund, carried out by the Inspectorate General of the Council of Ministers, confirmed mounting reports of ministerial mismanagement, including the hiring of unqualified people to the ministry and corruption in the granting process, over the past few months. The review was triggered by complaints from the Bulgarian Academy of Sciences and Sofia University that the fund was used to funnel millions of levs to unsound projects ignoring the merits of more worthy proposals. On February 6, Academician Stefan Vodenicharov was sworn is as the new Minister of Education and Science.

== Resignation ==
On February 20, 2013, the Borisov government offered its resignation. Parliament accepted the resignation the next morning with 209 MPs voting "for" and 5 "against" with 1 abstention. The move came after nationwide protests demanded it step down. The protests started earlier in the year over monopolies in the energy sector, which have resulted in increasing costs to the consumer. Austerity measures, unemployment and corruption were also reasons given by demonstrators for their discontent.

On March 13, 2013, a provisional government was set up, chaired by Marin Raykov, and the parliamentary elections were moved up.

== See also ==
- Second Borisov Government
- Third Borisov Government
- History of Bulgaria since 1989
