= Raykov Government =

Government of Bulgaria (Mar–May 2013)

- 91st Cabinet of Bulgaria

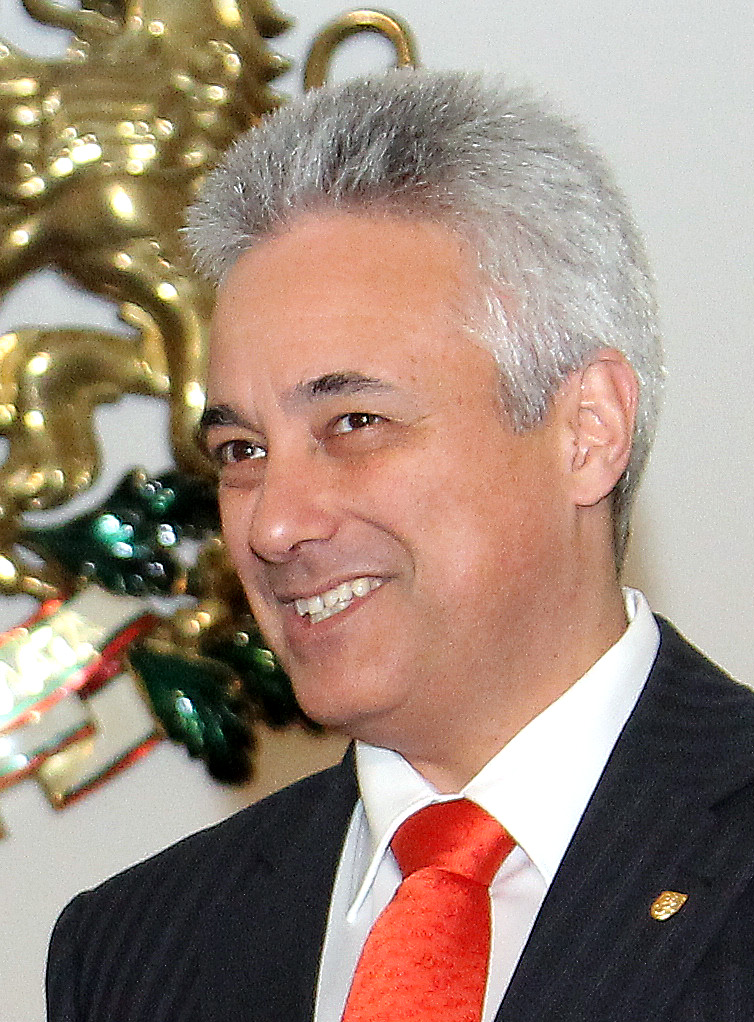
- Date formed: March 13, 2013
- Date dissolved: May 29, 2013

People and organisations
- Head of state: President Rosen Plevneliev
- Head of government: Marin Raykov
- Deputy head of government: See list: Ekaterina Zakharieva (Regional Development) Deyana Kostadinova (Labor and Social Policy) Iliyana Tsanova (Management of EU Funds)
- Status in legislature: Provisional Government

History
- Predecessor: Borisov Government
- Successor: Oresharski Government

The ninety-first Cabinet of Bulgaria was an interim technocratic government set up by President Rosen Plevneliev's decree No. 56 following the resignation of the Borisov government. The government, headed by Prime Minister Marin Raykov, ruled from March 13, 2013, to May 29, 2013, at which time the new cabinet took office.

== Cabinet ==
Ministry	Minister	Party
Prime Minister and Minister of Foreign affairs	Marin Raykov	Independent
Deputy Prime Minister and Minister of Regional Development	Ekaterina Zakharieva	Independent
Deputy Prime Minister and Minister of Labor and Social Policy	Deyana Kostadinova	Independent
Deputy Prime Minister and Management of EU Funds	Iliyana Tsanova	Independent
Minister of Interior	Petya Parvanova	Independent
Minister of Finance	Kalin Hristov	Independent
Minister of Economy, Energy and Tourism	Assen Vassilev	Independent
Ministry of Education, Youth and Science	Nikolay Miloshev	Independent
Minister of Justice	Dragomir Yordanov	Independent
Minister of Defence	Todor Tagarev	Independent
Ministry of Agriculture and Food	Ivan Stankov	Independent
Ministry of Transport, Information Technology and Communications	Kristian Krastev	Independent
Minister of Environment and Water	Julian Popov	Independent
Minister of Health	Nikolay Petrov	Independent
Ministry of Culture	Vladimir Penev	Independent
Minister of Physical Education and Sports	Petar Stoychev	Independent
Minister without Portfolio and e-Government	Roman Vasilev	Independent

Only 1 member of the Raykov government is known to have had affiliations with the Committee for State Security.

== See also ==
- History of Bulgaria since 1989
