= Ekaterina Zaharieva =

Bulgarian politician

- Екатерина Захариева
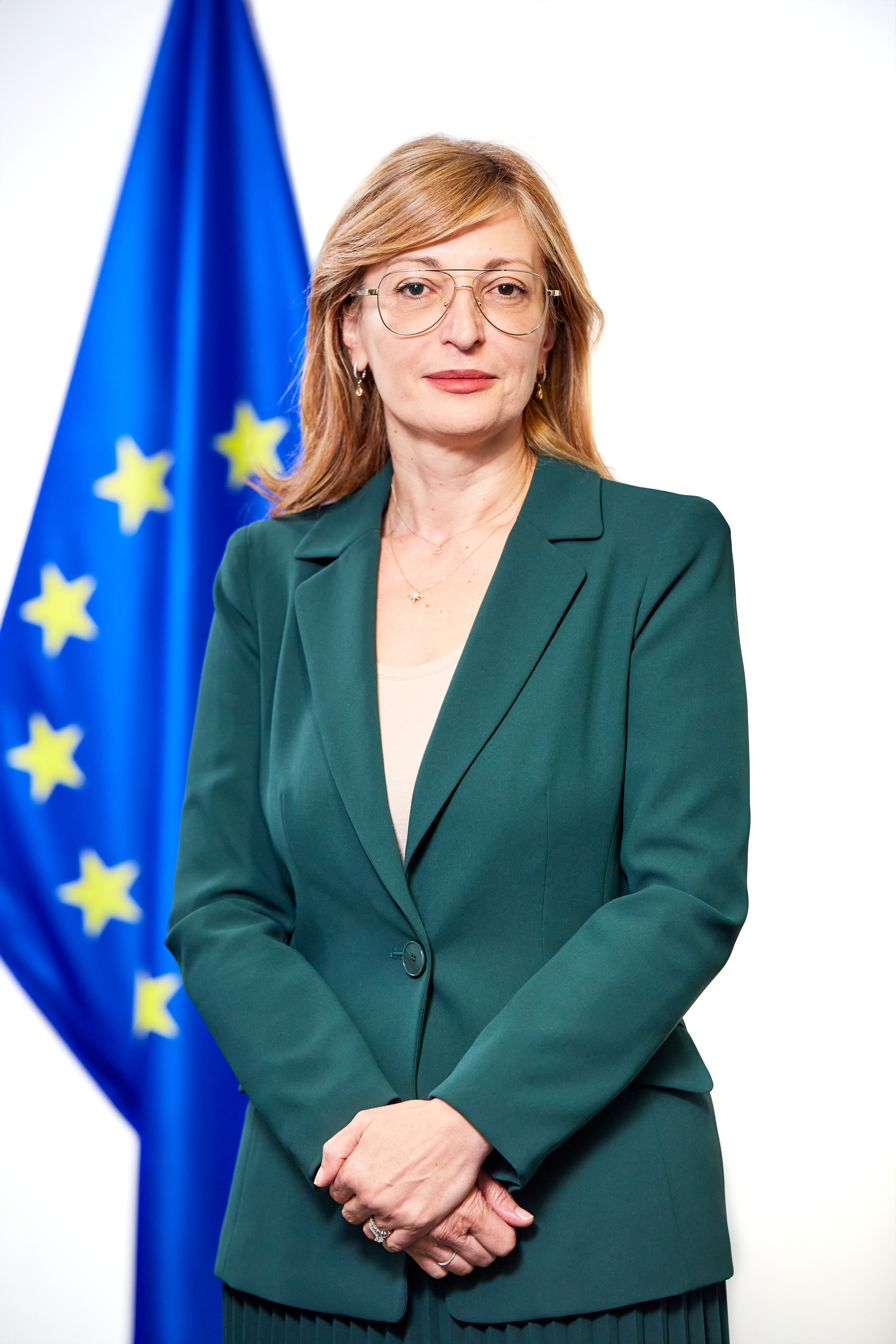
- Official portrait, 2024

European Commissioner for Startups, Research and Innovation
- Incumbent
- Assumed office 1 December 2024
- Commission: Von der Leyen II
- Preceded by: Iliana Ivanova (Note: As European Commissioner for Innovation, Research, Culture, Education and Youth)

Deputy Prime Minister of Bulgaria
- In office 4 May 2017 – 12 May 2021
- Prime Minister: Boyko Borisov
- Preceded by: Stefan Yanev
- Succeeded by: Atanas Pekanov
- In office 6 August 2014 – 7 November 2014
- Prime Minister: Georgi Bliznashki
- Preceded by: Daniela Bobeva
- Succeeded by: Meglena Kuneva
- In office 13 March 2013 – 29 May 2013
- Prime Minister: Marin Raykov
- Preceded by: Tsvetan Tsvetanov
- Succeeded by: Tsvetlin Yovchev

Minister of Foreign Affairs
- In office 4 May 2017 – 12 May 2021
- Prime Minister: Boyko Borisov
- Preceded by: Radi Naidenov
- Succeeded by: Svetlan Stoev

Minister of Justice
- In office 18 December 2015 – 27 January 2017
- Prime Minister: Boyko Borisov
- Preceded by: Hristo Ivanov
- Succeeded by: Mariya Pavlova

Minister of Regional Development and Public Works
- In office 6 August 2014 – 7 November 2014
- Prime Minister: Georgi Bliznashki
- Preceded by: Desislava Terzieva
- Succeeded by: Lilyana Pavlova
- In office 13 March 2013 – 29 May 2013
- Prime Minister: Marin Raykov
- Preceded by: Lilyana Pavlova
- Succeeded by: Desislava Terzieva
Parliamentary offices
Member of the National Assembly
In office 15 April 2021 – 19 September 2024
Constituency	13th MMC - Pazardzhik

Personal details
- Born: Ekaterina Spasova Gecheva; 8 August 1975 (age 50) Pazardzhik, PR Bulgaria
- Party: GERB
- Other political affiliations: European People’s Party
- Spouse: Angel Zahariev (m. 2006)
- Education: Plovdiv University
- Occupation: Politician; lawyer

Ekaterina Spasova Gecheva-Zaharieva (Note: pronounced [ɛkɐtɛˈrinɐ ˈspasovɐ ˈɡɛtʃɛvɐ zɐˈxariɛvɐ]) (Bulgarian: Екатерина Спасова Гечева-Захариева, born 8 August 1975) is a Bulgarian politician serving as European Commissioner for Startups, Research and Innovation. She served as Deputy Prime Minister of Bulgaria from 2017 to 2021 and on two occasions from 2013 to 2014. A member of the GERB party, she also served as Minister of Foreign Affairs from 2017 to 2021, Minister of Justice from 2015 to 2017, Minister of Regional Development on two occasions from 2013 to 2014 and Member of the National Assembly from 2021 to 2024.

== Early life and education ==
Zaharieva was born in Pazardzhik in 1975. She became fluent in German at her local college, then attended the University of Plovdiv where she graduated in law. This was followed by a law master's degree.

== Career ==
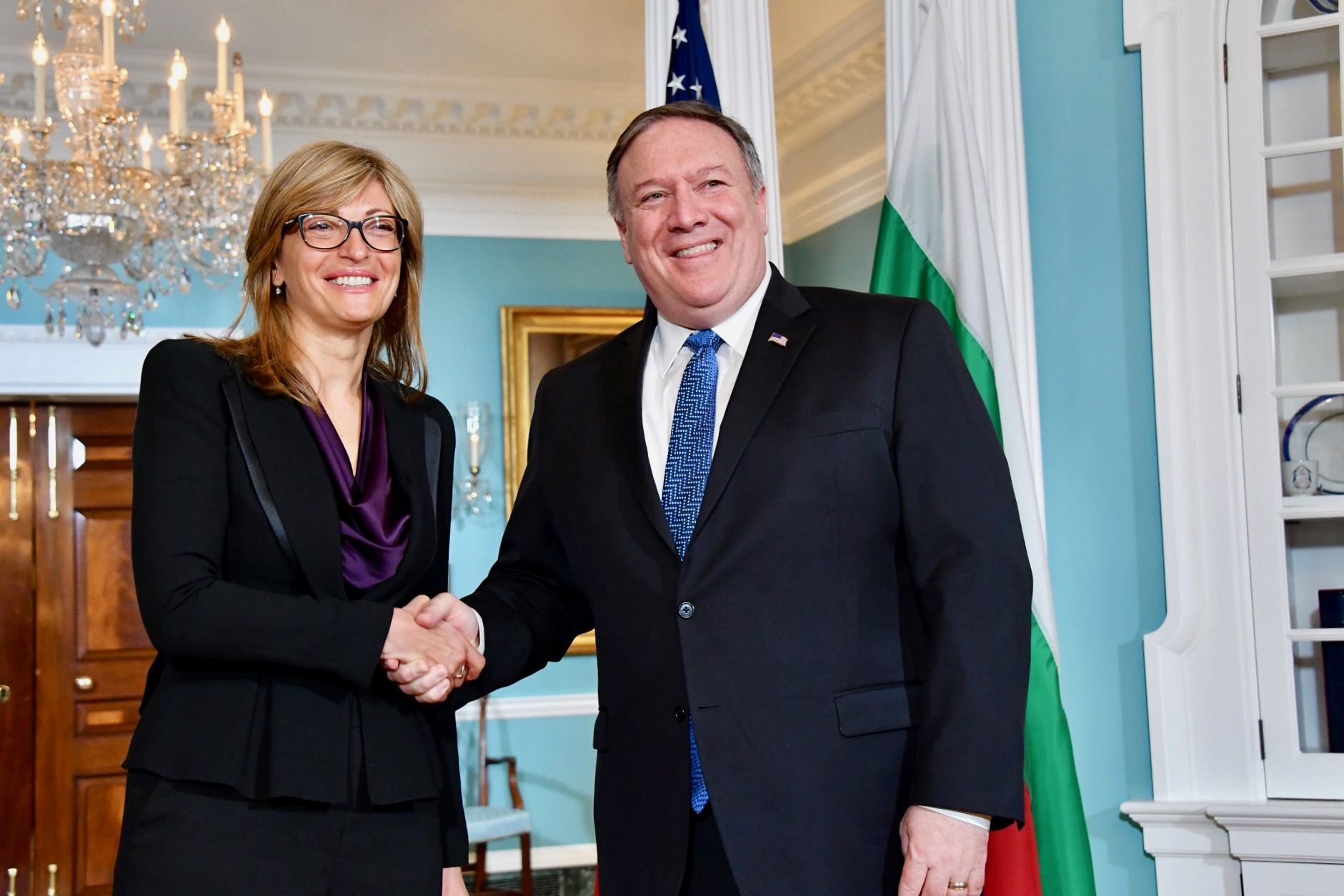
Zaharieva meets with U.S. Secretary of State Michael R. Pompeo at the U.S. Department of State in Washington, D.C., on November 5, 2018.

She worked as a lawyer until 2003. She then became a legal Advisor of the Ministry of Environment and Water. Zaharieva became the Director of Legal, Administrative and Regulatory Services in 2007.

Entering politics in 2009, she became the Deputy Minister of Regional Development to the Minister Rosen Plevneliev. When Plevneliev became President of Bulgaria, he chose her for the position of one of the Deputy Prime Ministers from March to May in 2013. She was interim deputy Prime Minister to Marin Raykov in the Bulgarian Cabinet.

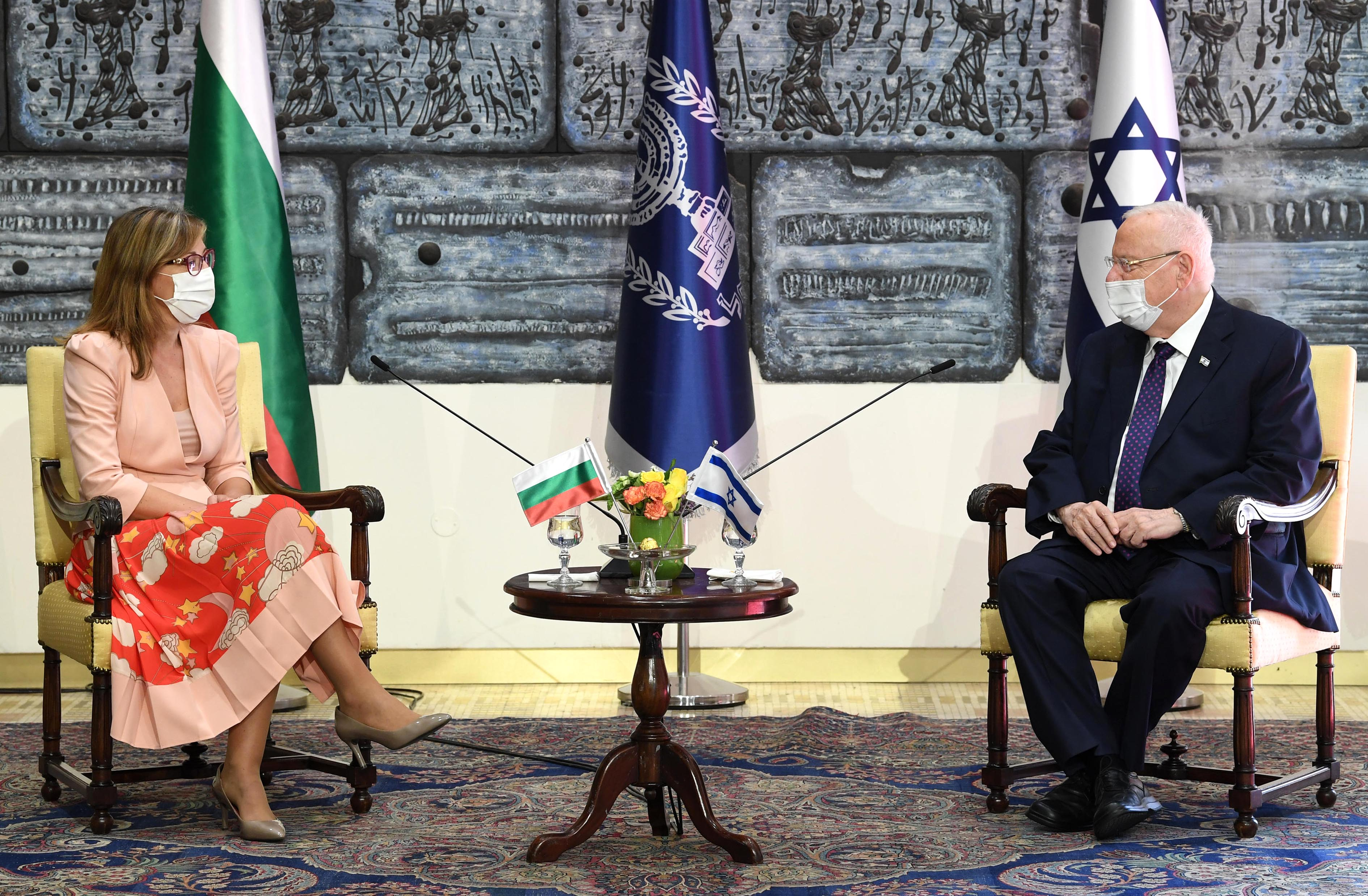
Zaharieva with President of Israel Reuven Rivlin in Jerusalem, 12 November 2020

In 2013 she was the Minister of Regional Development. From 18 December 2015 she served as Minister of Justice until 27 January 2017. She became the Foreign Minister of Bulgaria on 4 May 2017.

In August 2024 she was nominated, alongside Julian Popov, by the Bulgarian Government to be the next commissioner in the second von der Leyen Commission. Bulgaria was the only country to have followed Von der Leyen's request to nominate two candidates. Zaharieva was chosen by von der Leyen and proposed as the next Commissioner for Startups, Research and Innovation. On 27 November 2024, the European Parliament elected the College of Commissioners as a whole. The newly appointed Commission is starting its five-year term as from 1 December 2024.

== See also ==
- List of foreign ministers in 2017
- List of current foreign ministers

== Notes ==
Political offices
Preceded by Hristo Ivanov	Minister of Justice; 2015–2017	Succeeded by Maria Pavlova
Preceded by Radi Naidenov	Minister of Foreign Affairs; 2017–2021	Succeeded by Svetlan Stoev
