= Borisov Government =

Borisov Government may refer to:

- First Borisov Government (2009–2013)
- Second Borisov Government (2014–2017)
- Third Borisov Government (2017-2021)
