= Parties in the European Council between January and June 2013 =

The member-states of the European Union by the European party affiliations of their leaders, as of 1 January 2013.

Until 1 July 2013 the European Union will have twenty-seven members. On that date, Croatia is expected to join the Union, therefore forcing a change of the influence each member-state has, as well as its Qualified Majority Voting. This article describes the party affiliations of leaders of each member-state represented in the European Council during the year 2013. The list below gives the political party that each head of government, or head of state, belongs to at the national level, as well as the national level to which that national party belongs. The states are listed from most to least populous. More populous states have greater influence in the council, in accordance with the system of Qualified Majority Voting.

== Summary ==
Party	1 January 2013		28 February 2013		11 March 2213		13 March 2013		20 March 2013		29 May 2013
Party	#	QMV	#	QMV	#	QMV	#	QMV	#	QMV	#	QMV
European People's Party	15	182	16	186	15	183	14	173	13	169	13	169
Party of European Socialists	5	65	5	65	6	68	6	68	6	68	7	78
Alliance of European Conservatives and Reformists	2	41	2	41	2	41	2	41	2	41	2	41
Independent	2	36	2	36	2	36	3	46	4	50	3	40
Alliance of Liberals and Democrats for Europe Party	2	17	2	17	2	17	2	17	2	17	2	17
Party of the European Left	1	4	0	0	0	0	0	0	0	0	0	0

== List of leaders (1 January 2013) ==
Member-state	Votes	Leader	National party	European party
Germany	29	Angela Merkel	CDU	EPP
France	29	François Hollande	PS	PES
United Kingdom	29	David Cameron	Con	AECR
Italy	29	Mario Monti	SC	Independent
Spain	27	Mariano Rajoy	PP	EPP
Poland	27	Donald Tusk	PO	EPP
Romania	14	Traian Băsescu	Independent	EPP
Netherlands	13	Mark Rutte	VVD	ALDE Party
Greece	12	Antonis Samaras	ND	EPP
Belgium	12	Elio Di Rupo	PS	PES
Portugal	12	Pedro Passos Coelho	PPD/PSD	EPP
Czech Republic	12	Petr Nečas	ODS	AECR
Hungary	12	Viktor Orbán	Fidesz	EPP
Sweden	10	Fredrik Reinfeldt	M	EPP
Austria	10	Werner Faymann	SPÖ	PES
Bulgaria	10	Boyko Borisov	GERB	EPP
Denmark	7	Helle Thorning-Schmidt	A	PES
Slovakia	7	Robert Fico	SMER-SD	PES
Finland	7	Jyrki Katainen	Kok.	EPP
Ireland	7	Enda Kenny	FG	EPP
Lithuania	7	Dalia Grybauskaitė	Independent
Slovenia	4	Janez Janša	SDS	EPP
Latvia	4	Valdis Dombrovskis	V	EPP
Estonia	4	Andrus Ansip	RE	ALDE Party
Cyprus	4	Demetris Christofias	AKEL	PEL
Luxembourg	4	Jean-Claude Juncker	CSV	EPP
Malta	3	Lawrence Gonzi	PN	EPP

Supported by PD-L
AKEL holds only observer status with the Party of the European Left.

== Changes ==
=== Affiliation ===
Date	Member-state	Leader	National party	European party
28 February	Cyprus	Nicos Anastasiades	DISY	EPP
11 March	Malta	Joseph Muscat	PL	PES
13 March	Bulgaria	Marin Raykov	Independent
20 March	Slovenia	Alenka Bratušek	PS	Independent
29 May	Bulgaria	Plamen Oresharski	Independent	PES (Note: PES General Secretary Achim Post stated that; “the PES sends the warmest congratulations to the BSP on the formation of the new Government in Bulgaria. Plamen Oresharski becomes the tenth PES head of State or Government in the European Council" although not member of BSP. See the PES press release: "New Bulgarian Government will be one with an irreproachable sense of integrity, responsibility and urgency, says Sergei Stanishev".)

=== Office-holder only ===
Date	Member-state	Leader	National party	European party
28 April	Italy	Enrico Letta	PD	Independent

== See also ==
- Presidency of the Council of the European Union
