= Dragomir Yordanov =

Bulgarian judge and politician (born 1967)

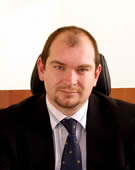

Minister of Justice
- In office 12 March 2013 – 29 May 2013
- President: Rosen Plevneliev
- Prime Minister: Marin Raykov
- Preceded by: Diana Kovacheva
- Succeeded by: Zinaida Zlatanova

Personal details
- Born: 28 September 1967 (age 59) Sofia
- Party: Independent
- Education: Sofia Kliment Ohridski University

Dragomir Yordanov (Bulgarian: Драгомир Йорданов) (born 28 September 1967) is a Bulgarian judge and a politician who served as the caretaker justice minister from 12 March 2013 to 29 May 2013.

== Early life and education ==
Yordanov was born in Sofia on 28 September 1967. He graduated from Sofia French Language School and Sofia University St. Kliment Ohridski with a master's degree in law.

== Career ==
Yordanov was a junior judge and then a criminal judge in the Sofia District Court from 1994 to 1999. Then he worked as the executive director of the Magistrate Training Centre from 1999 to 2004. He was the deputy director and programme director of the National Institute of Justice from 2004 to 2011. In addition, he worked as a criminal judge in Kosovo as part of the European Union Rule of Law Mission from 2009 to 2010. Next Yordanov served as the director of the National Institute of Justice from 2011 to March 2013. He was appointed justice minister to the caretaker government led by prime minister Marin Raykov on 12 March 2013. Yordanov was replaced by Zinaida Zlatanova in the post on 29 May 2013.
