= Radi Naydenov =

Bulgarian politician and diplomat

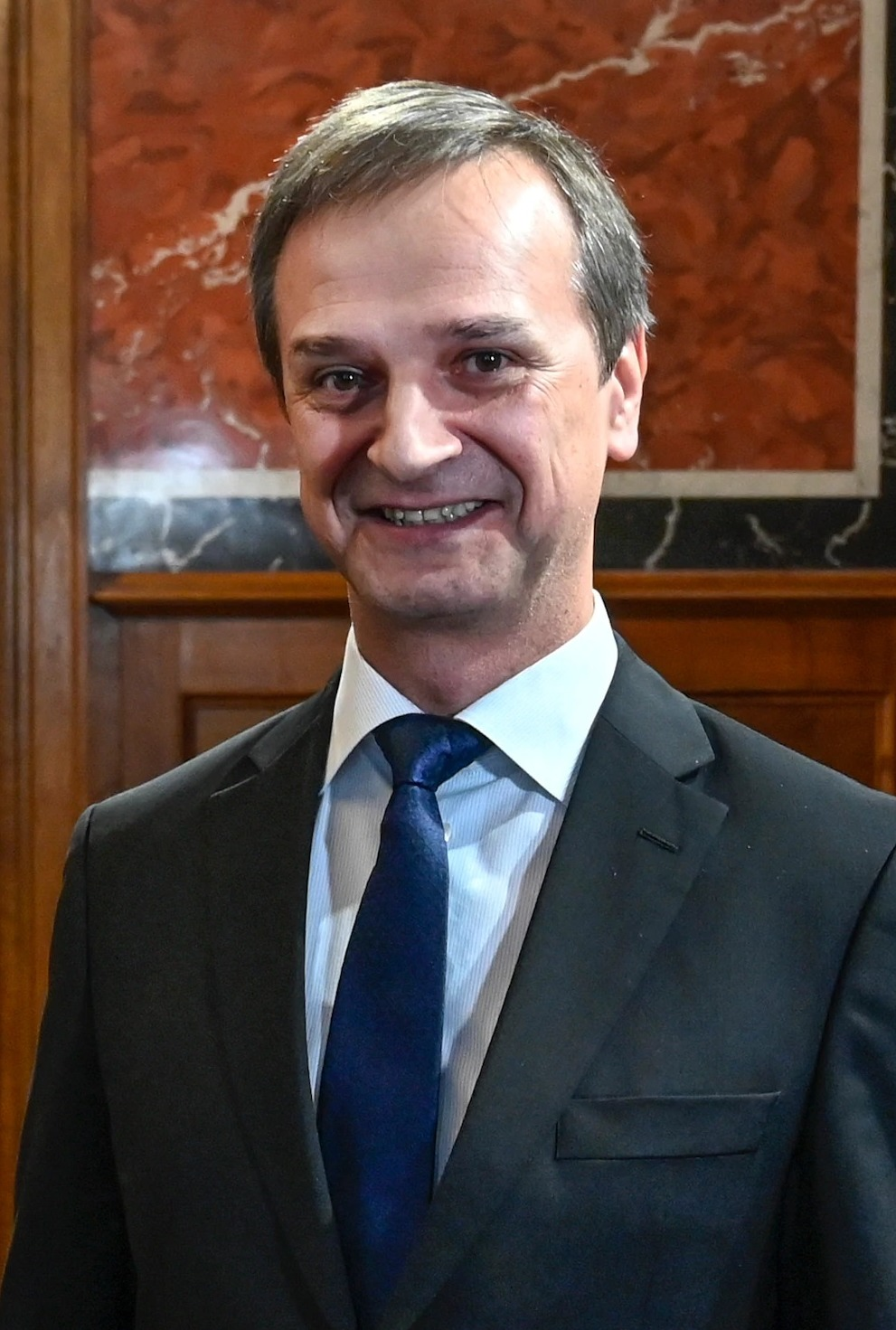
- Naydenov in 2020

Minister of Foreign Affairs
- In office 27 January 2017 – 4 May 2017
- Prime Minister: Ognyan Gerdzhikov (acting)
- Preceded by: Daniel Mitov
- Succeeded by: Ekaterina Zaharieva

Personal details
- Born: 24 August 1962 (age 64) Sofia, Bulgaria
- Party: Independent
- Education: University of National and World Economy

Radi Naydenov (Bulgarian: Ради Найденов) (born 24 August 1962 in Sofia, Bulgaria) is a Bulgarian politician and diplomat. He joined the Bulgarian diplomatic service in 1992, and in 2002 he was Bulgaria’s Deputy Minister of Defense. From 2002 until 2005, he was Head of Cabinet of the Prime Minister of the Republic of Bulgaria, Simeon Saxe-Coburg-Gotha. He then served as Bulgaria’s ambassador to Germany, and was the Foreign Minister of Bulgaria between 27 January 2017 and 4 May 2017.

== Early life and education ==
Radi Naydenov was born in 1962 in Sofia, Bulgaria. In addition to his native Bulgarian, he speaks German, English, and Russian. In 1989, he graduated with an M.A. degree in international relations from the University of National and World Economy in Sofia.

== Career ==
=== Diplomatic roles ===
He joined the Bulgarian diplomatic service in 1992. He took part in a number of “specialization programs” at foreign ministries, including Germany, France, and the United States. In 2002, he was Bulgaria’s Deputy Minister of Defense. From 2002 until 2005, he was Head of Cabinet of the Prime Minister of the Republic of Bulgaria, Simeon Saxe-Coburg-Gotha. In 2005, Bulgaria appointed him Ambassador Extraordinary and Plenipotentiary to the Republic of Austria, a role he held until 2012. He then held the same role as ambassador to the Republic of Germany starting in 2012. From 2011 until 2012, he was the Permanent Secretary of the Ministry of Foreign Affairs. As Chief Secretary of the Foreign Ministry, he worked in the first Boyko Borisov-led cabinet. In 2017 he received the Silbernes Komturkreuz mit dem Stern des Ehrenzeichens für Verdienste um das Bundesland Niederösterreich.

=== Foreign Minister of Bulgaria ===
In January 2017, the media suggested that Neydenov, acting at the time as the Bulgarian Ambassador to Germany, was “most likely” designated to become the caretaker Foreign Minister of Bulgaria. By January 25, he had been appointed a member of Ognyan Gerdzhikov’s caretaker cabinet as Foreign Minister. The position was to be until the early general election on March 26, 2017. Reuters described the appointment by as an effort by Radev to “reaffirm Sofia’s commitment to its allies in the European Union and NATO.”

On February 23, he stated that it did not matter “when” Bulgaria nominated a new European Commissioner, but more “who” the nominee was. The post had been vacant since Kristalina Georgieva resigned earlier that year, and there had been debate about who would appoint a replacement, and when it would take place in relation to the upcoming election. In March 2017, Naydenov sought to defuse a political row over election meddling with Turkey, stating that “We can't allow political declarations to threaten what has already been built between the two countries. We have a good partnership that needs to be developed.” In late March 2017, Belarusian Foreign Minister Vladimir Makei sent a letter concerning diplomatic relations with Bulgaria to Naydenov. Ekaterina Zakharieva became the Foreign Minister of Bulgaria on 4 May 2017.

== See also ==
- List of foreign ministers in 2017
- List of ambassadors to Germany
- List of Bulgarians
- Foreign relations of Bulgaria

Political offices
Preceded by Daniel Mitov	Minister of Foreign Affairs; 2017	Succeeded by Ekaterina Zakharieva
