= Petya Parvanova =

Bulgarian politician

- Петя Първанова
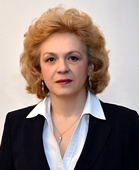

Minister of Interior
- In office 12 March 2013 – 29 May 2013
- President: Rosen Plevneliev
- Prime Minister: Marin Raykov
- Preceded by: Tsvetan Tsvetanov
- Succeeded by: Tsvetlin Yovchev

Personal details
- Born: 12 July 1960 (age 66) Sofia
- Party: Independent
- Education: Sofia Kliment Ohridski University; New Bulgarian University

Petya Parvanova (Bulgarian: Петя Първанова; born 12 July 1960) was the interior minister of Bulgaria for a brief period in 2013. She was the first woman to head the ministry in the country.

== Early life and education ==
Parvanova was born in Sofia on 12 July 1960. She holds a bachelor's degree in German philology, which she received from Sofia University in 1991. She received a master's degree in law from New Bulgarian University in 1998.

== Career ==
From 1978 to 1981 Parvanova was an administrator at Balkantourist. From 1982 to 1991 she served as an interpreter at the East German embassy in Sofia. Later she worked as an assistant and translator at various companies. From 1999 to 2001 she served as the head of the international relations and protocol sector at the Prosecutor-General's office. In 2001, Purvanova was named as the deputy director at the same body, and later, she became the director of international cooperation at the interior ministry. She was promoted to the rank of police general.

On 12 March 2013, she was appointed interior minister to the caretaker government led by Marin Raykov. She became the first woman interior minister of Bulgaria. Her term ended on 29 May 2013 when Tsvetlin Yovchev was appointed interior minister.

For the duration of her service at the Ministry of the Interior, she was awarded many times for high performance service and professionalism with medals and honors – "for valor and merit", first degree in 2007. In 2010 she was awarded with category A – senior commissioner.

In March 2016 she was appointed Chairperson of the State Agency for Refugees with the Council of Ministers of Republic of Bulgaria.

On 9 May 2019, she was awarded the Chevalier of the National Order of the Legion of Honor.
