= Plamen Goranov =

Bulgarian rights activist (1976–2013)

- Born: 20 October 1976; People's Republic of Bulgaria
- Died: 3 March 2013 (aged 36); Varna, Bulgaria
- Cause of death: Burns from self-immolation

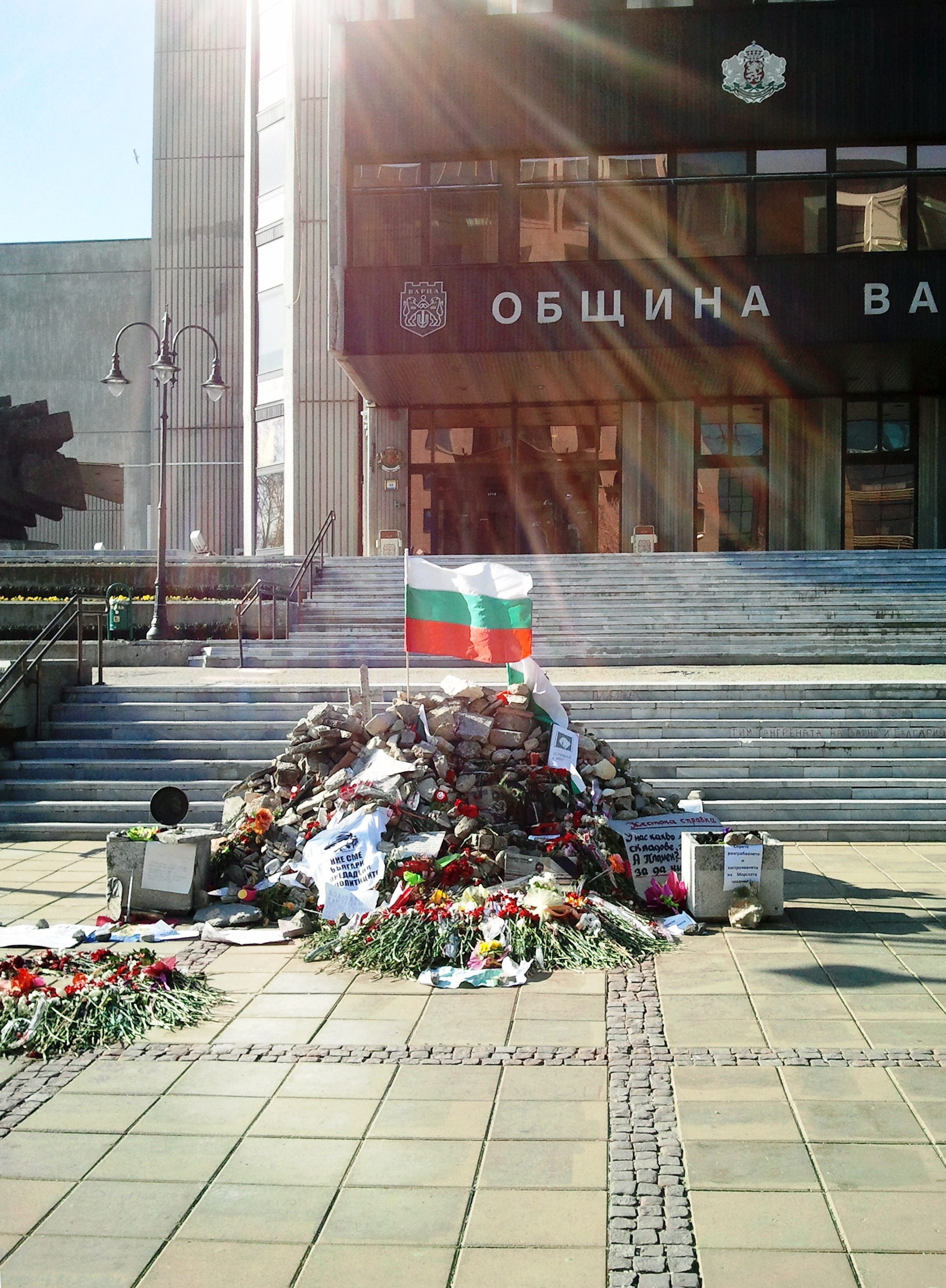

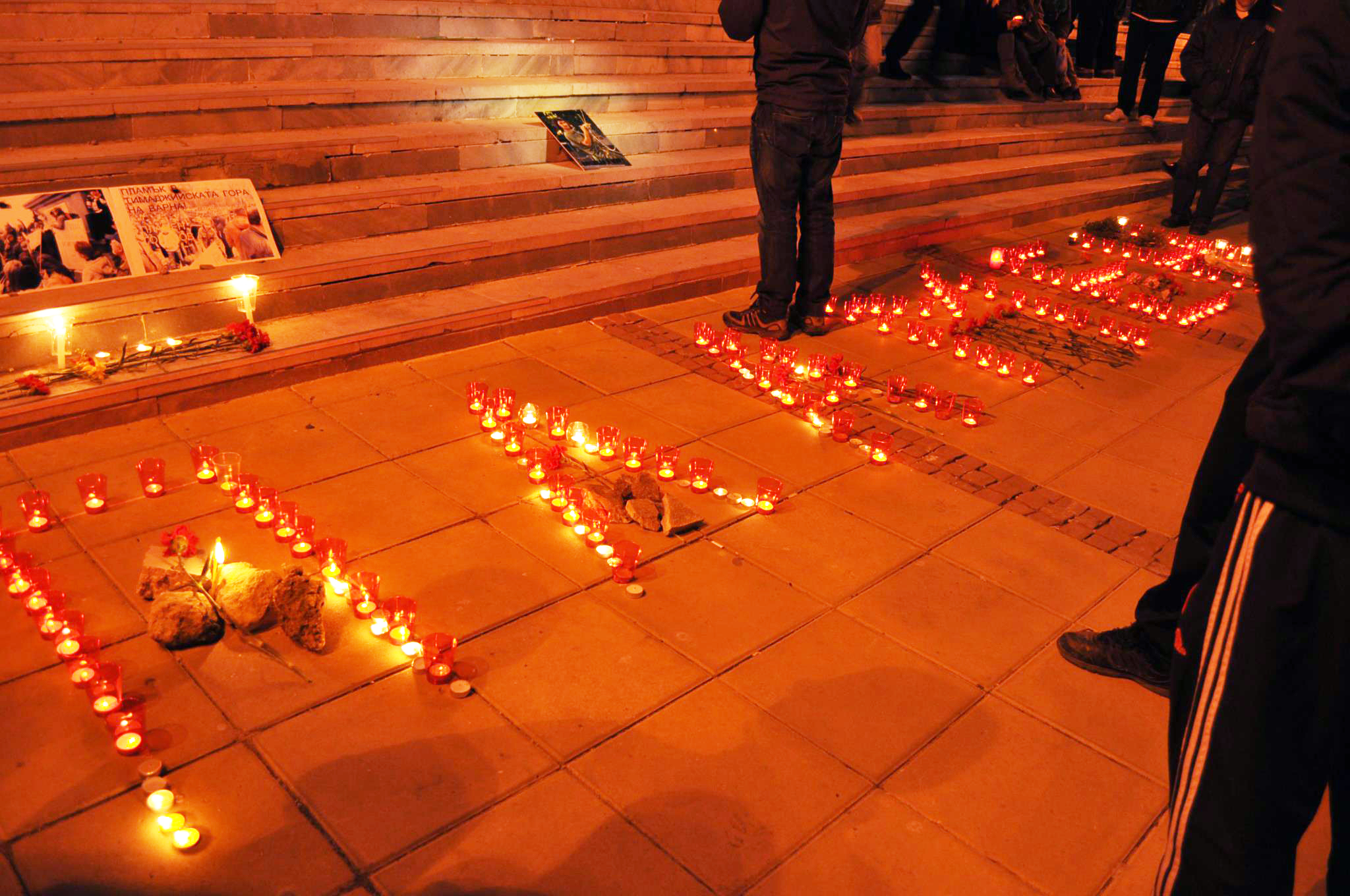

Plamen Goranov (Bulgarian: Пламен Горанов; 20 October 1976 – 3 March 2013) was a Bulgarian photographer and mountain climber, and a Varna-based local protest leader of the 2013 Bulgarian nationwide protests. He became a symbol of the Bulgarian social protest movements and a catalyst for nationwide protests and government resignations when on 20 February 2013 he set himself on fire in front of the Varna municipal building. He died from his injuries in a local hospital on 3 March, Bulgarian Liberation Day, a Bulgarian national holiday celebrating liberation from five centuries of Ottoman rule. Goranov protested against the organized crime group TIM and the TIM-controlled Varna mayor Kiril Yordanov.

After setting himself on fire, Goranov became the subject of discussions and received active support on social networks. Approximately 300 people donated blood for transfusion while he was in hospital. On the day of his death, people in Sofia and Varna gathered to pay their respects to Goranov.

Goranov was the first of six Bulgarians who set themselves on fire during the Bulgarian nationwide protest.

== Death ==
According to the official report by the prosecution, on the morning of 20 February 2013, Goranov arrived in front of the Varna municipal building a little before 7:30 carrying a backpack, a poster, and two bottles of gasoline. Recordings of nearby security cameras show him putting the two bottles down, taking out a white sheet, and laying the sheet on the ground. He then proceeded to pour the contents of one of the bottles over himself, which attracted the attention of a municipal officer who came out to investigate. Goranov informed the officer that he would set himself on fire, after which the officer went back in the building and came back shortly with a second officer. At that point Goranov lit himself on fire. The two officers went back into the building again and eventually returned with fire extinguishers, but at that point Goranov had already endured burn injuries to 80 percent of his body.

According to witnesses, while Goranov was on fire, he was saying "Kiro, Kiro, today I was supposed to be in Antalya" (note Kiro being short for Kiril, reference to Kiril Yordanov, the then mayor of Varna Municipality).

At some point, an official from the municipality took away the poster brought by Goranov. After testimonials of witnesses and the fact that the poster was missing becoming public, the official handed in the poster to the local police. No charges were pressed against him. On the way to the hospital, Goranov said that he didn't want to kill himself. Goranov died on 3 March 2013. Two days later Varna Mayor Yordanov resigned.

== Legacy ==
Goranov became known as the Bulgarian Jan Palach, a Czech student who set himself on fire in 1969 after the Soviets crushed the Prague Spring and whose memory became a catalyst for overthrow of the communist regime. Goranov was also compared to Tunisian Mohamed Bouazizi who in death became a symbol for the Arab Spring.

An article by Sofia News Agency noting the massive protests that had occurred already prior to Goranov's death, described the effect of Goranov's death: "Bulgaria was jolted like never before." A foundation was set up in Goranov's honor. Another author describes it this way: "Goranov carried th[e] spark… of growing social tensions." An article in the Guardian noted, "Goranov's sacrifice may not resonate in the west (sic) as loudly as Jan Palach's did during the Prague spring 40-odd years earlier, but to Bulgarians it is just as cathartic."

6 March 2013, was designated a day of national mourning for Goranov; and on that day the mayor of Varna Kiril Yordanov, widely implicated in TIM mafia activities, resigned following huge protests. Also on that day, the cabinet of Bulgarian prime minister Boyko Borisov resigned, and held a minute's silence in tribute to Goranov as they did so.

Despite limited police efforts to prevent it, a pile of rocks covered with flowers and topped by the Bulgarian flag was erected on the square in front of Varna city hall to mark the spot where Goranov set himself on fire. This was possibly a tribute to Goranov's passion for climbing but is more generally regarded as an allusion to famous Bulgarian poet Ivan Vazov's poem "Gramada".

According to a report in The New York Times, Goranov's death has become for Bulgarians a symbol of despair that things will never change, but it also marks a loss of fear among the populace to take on mafia group TIM, described in a 2005 leaked U.S. Embassy cable as "the up-and-coming star of Bulgarian organized crime" fingered for involvement in various illicit activities including "extortion and racketeering, intimidation, prostitution, gambling, narcotics trafficking and car theft." As a leader of a 30,000-strong protest prior to his death, Goranov had led chants of, "Down with TIM."

On October 25, 2024, 11 years after the death of Plamen Goranov, a plaza was added in front of the Varna Municipality building in his memory.

== Other activities ==
In 2012 Goranov scaled three 35-foot-tall female statues on the monument of Soviet-Bulgarian friendship overlooking Varna and placed colored hoods over their heads in solidarity with jailed members of Russian punk protest band Pussy Riot.

== Quote ==
"Whatever it is that people do, they need to do it with passion and to do it well."

== See also ==
- List of political self-immolations
- Bulgarian parliamentary election, 2013
