= Daniel Mitov =

Bulgarian politician

- Даниел Митов
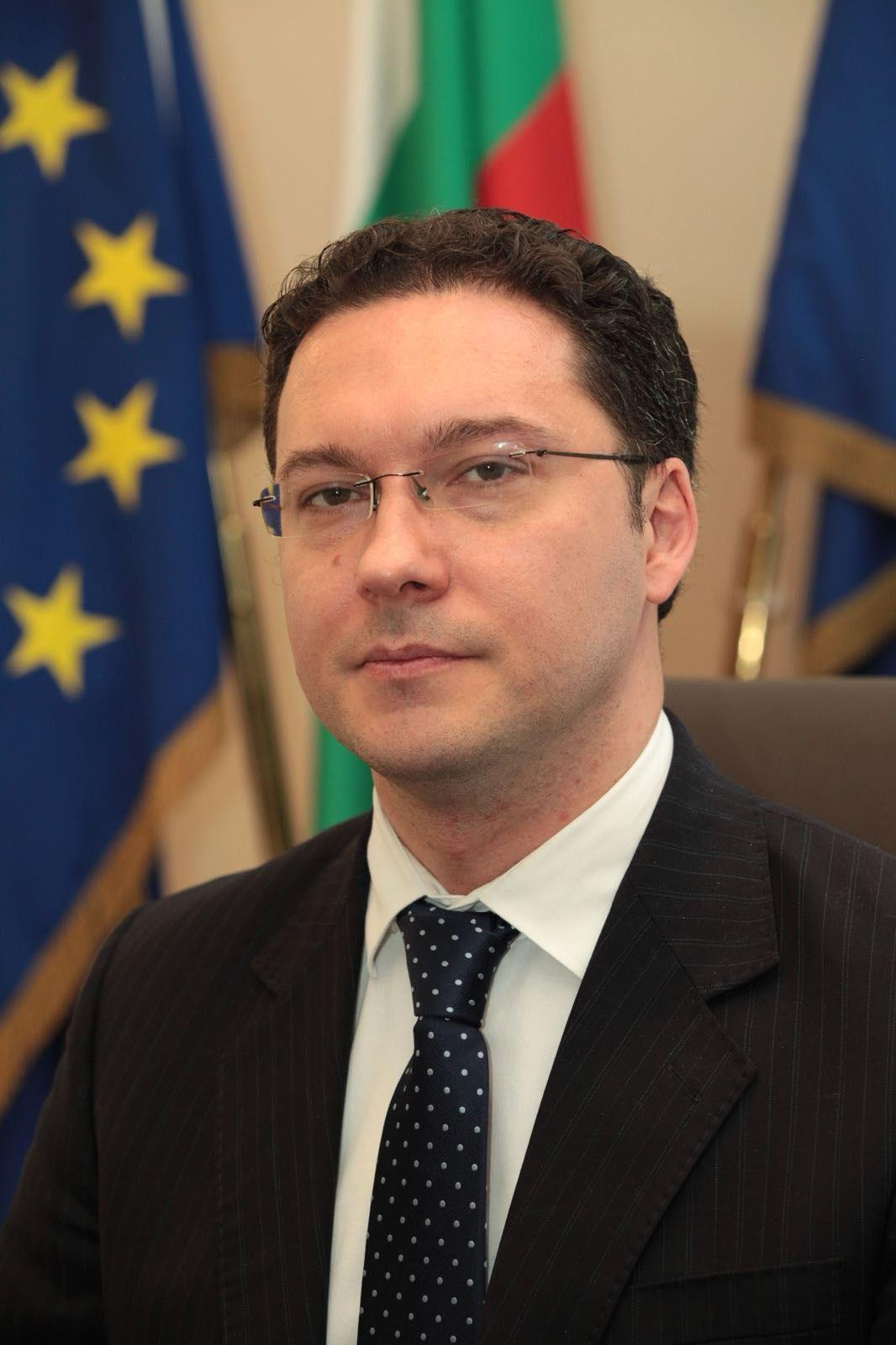

Minister of the Interior
- In office 16 January 2025 – 19 February 2026
- Prime Minister: Rosen Zhelyazkov
- Preceded by: Atanas Ilkov
- Succeeded by: Emil Dechev

Member of the National Assembly
- Incumbent
- Assumed office 15 April 2021
- Constituency: 24th MMC - Sofia (2021-2022); 3rd MMC - Varna (2022-present)

Minister of Foreign Affairs
- In office 6 August 2014 – 27 January 2017
- Prime Minister: Georgi Bliznashki; Boyko Borissov
- Preceded by: Kristian Vigenin
- Succeeded by: Radi Naidenov

Personal details
- Born: Daniel Pavlov Mitov; 4 December 1977 (age 48) Sofia, PR Bulgaria
- Party: GERB (since 2021)
- Other political affiliations: DSB (2006-2012); DBG (2012-2021)
- Education: Sofia University (BA); New Bulgarian University (MA)
- Occupation: Politician; diplomat

Daniel Pavlov Mitov (Bulgarian: Даниел Павлов Митов; born 4 December 1977) is a Bulgarian politician. He served as Minister of Foreign Affairs of Bulgaria from 2014 to 2017.

He became Minister of Foreign Affairs on August 6, 2014 in the cabinet of Georgi Bliznashki and remained in that post in the cabinet of Boyko Borisov from October 7, 2014.

== Early life and education ==
Born in Sofia, Mitov received his higher education at the Sofia University. In addition to his native Bulgarian, he is fluent in English, Italian, and Russian.

== Political career ==
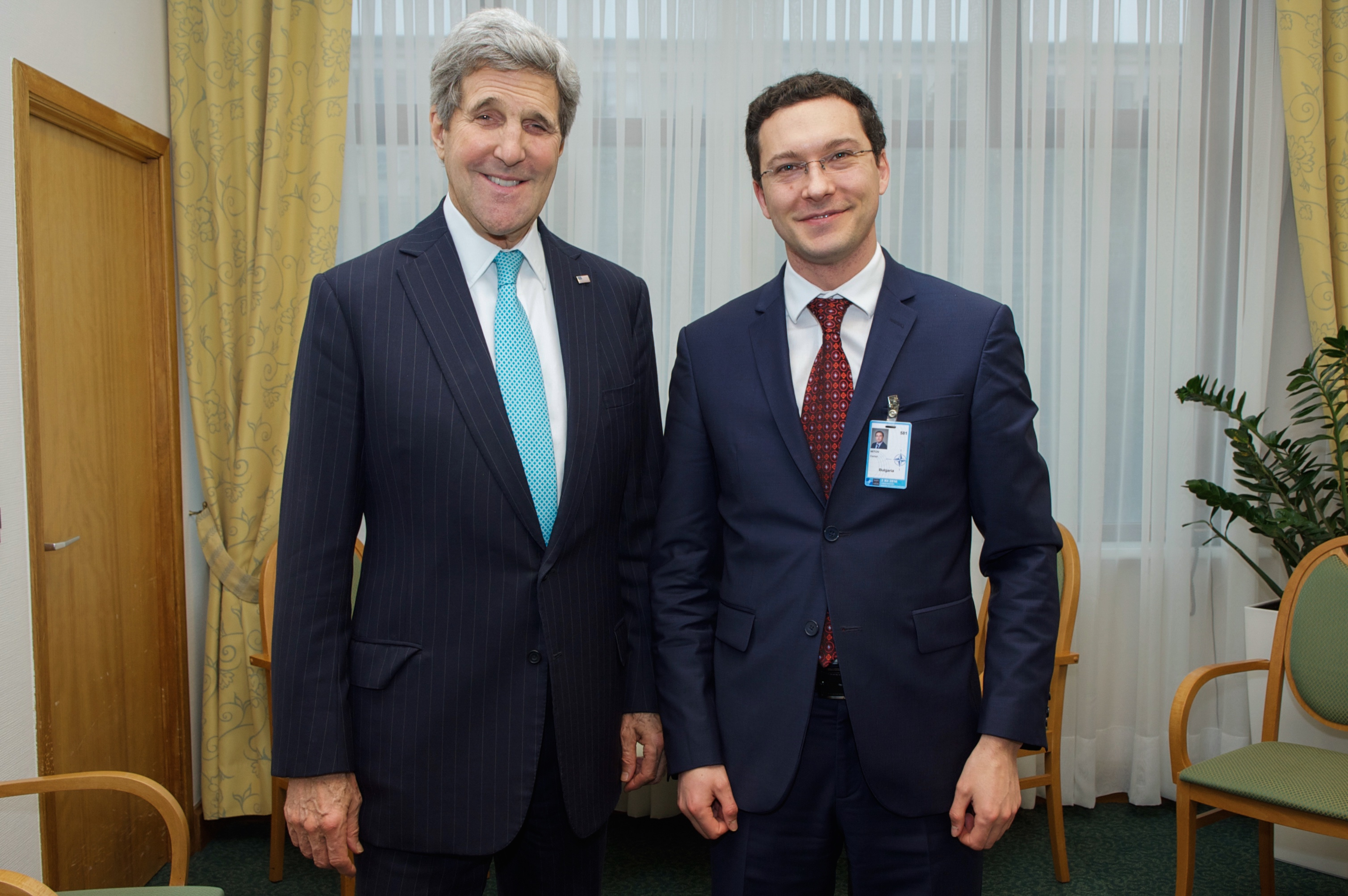
Mitov with U.S. Secretary of State John Kerry in Brussels, 2 December 2014

In 2002, Mitov worked at the Political Academy for Central and Southeast Europe and in 2006 became a member of Bulgaria's Democracy Foundation. Following his succession there, he became a deputy chairman of the Democrats for a Strong Bulgaria party and since 2010 works at the National Democratic Institute with the delegates of North Africa and the Middle East.

== Fight against terrorism ==
In a speech at the Israel Council on Foreign Relations in 2016, Mitov begins by calling terrorism the biggest issue of the Middle East. In his words, terrorism “regardless of how many resources we allocate to assisting the countries of origin and transit, the refugee flow and terrorist channels will not disappear as long as ISIS and similar actors exist on the ground". On that occasion, he noted that "the teachings of Islam could be directed toward civil activity instead of toward politicization, and consequently, radicalization". In order to help the Middle East with this dilemma, he suggested the importance of European support by explaining that aid should be given to countries that take in refugees and policies should be reinforced in quelling terrorism worldwide.

== Honours ==
- Sovereign Military Order of Malta:
  - Grand Cross of the Order pro Merito Melitensi

== See also ==
- 2014 Wales summit
- List of foreign ministers in 2017
- Foreign relations of Bulgaria
- List of Bulgarians

Political offices
Preceded by Kristian Vigenin	64th Minister of Foreign Affairs; 6 August 2014 – 27 January 2017	Succeeded by Radi Naidenov
