= Kiril Yordanov =

Bulgarian politician (born 1956)

Kiril Yordanov (Bulgarian: Кирил Йорданов) (born June 14, 1956) is the former mayor of Varna, the third-largest city in Bulgaria. He held the post from 1999 to 6 March 2013 as an independent when he was forced to step down after the anti-corruption protests involving even the self-immolation of one of the protesters Plamen Goranov. Yordanov was born in Varna, and graduated from the University of Sofia in 1982 with a degree in law. He worked in Varna Province Court from 1984 to 1991. From 1991 to 1997 he was governor of Varna Province (oblast). He is married and has one child.

== See also ==
- 2013 Bulgarian parliamentary election

Preceded by Hristo Kirchev	Mayor of Varna; 1999–2013	Succeeded by Ivan Portnih
