= Rositsa Yanakieva =

Bulgarian politician

Rositsa Yanakieva (Bulgarian: Росица Янакиева) (July 7, 1954 – January 26, 2015) was a Bulgarian politician and chemist, who served as the Deputy Speaker of the National Assembly from 2014 until January 2015. She served as the Mayor of Pernik, Bulgaria, for two, consecutive terms from 2005 to 2014.

In 2014, Yanakieva joined the Alternative for Bulgarian Revival (ABV), a center-left political party founded by former President Georgi Parvanov. She was elected as an MP of the National Assembly in the 2014 Bulgarian parliamentary election on October 5, 2014. She was subsequently elected Deputy Speaker of the 43rd National Assembly, a post she held until her death in January 2015.

Rositsa Yanakieva suffered a brain hemorrhage on January 6, 2015. She remained in a coma until her death on January 26, 2015, at the age of 60.
