= Ivaylo Moskovski =

Bulgarian politician

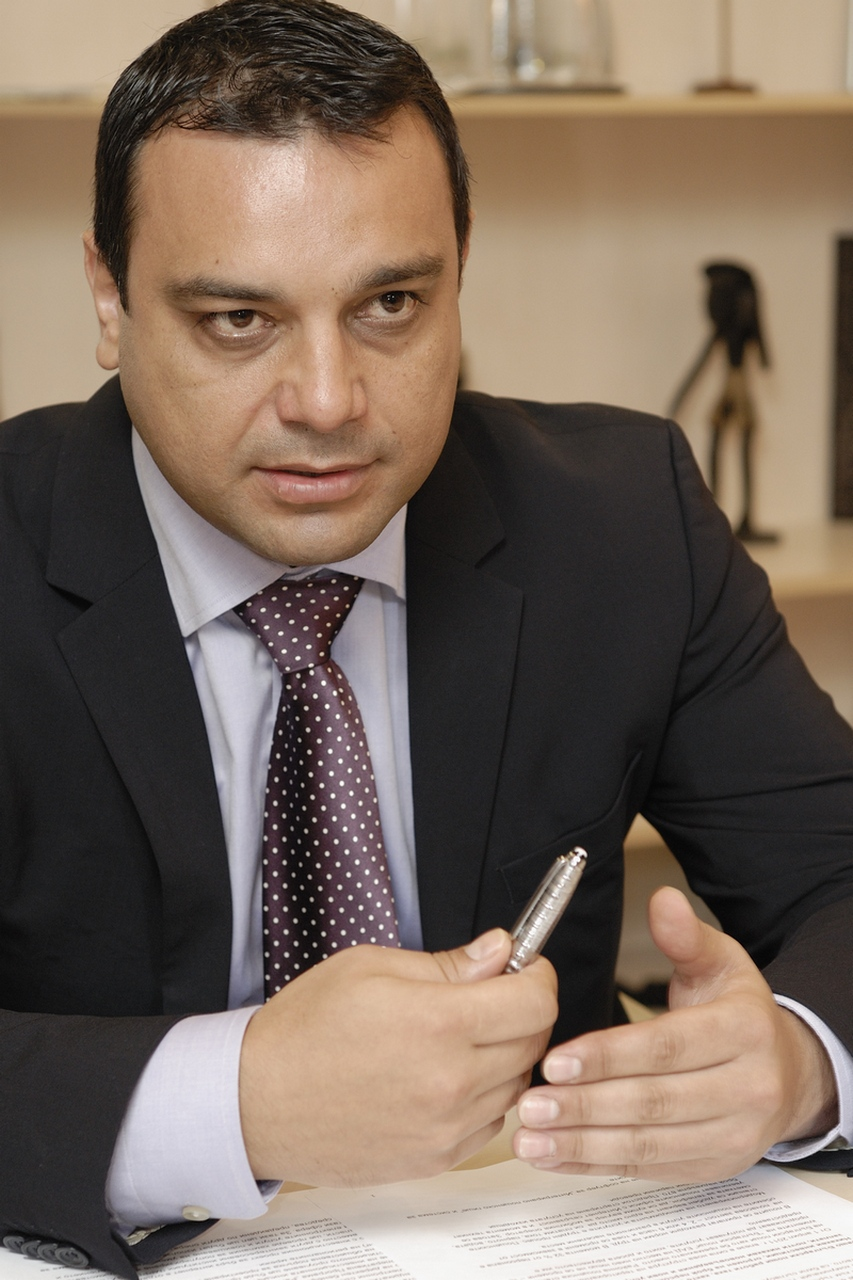

Minister of Transport, Information Technology and Communications of Bulgaria
- In office 19 May 2011 – 30 October 2018
- Prime Minister: Boyko Borisov
- Preceded by: Aleksandar Tsvetkov
- Succeeded by: Rossen Jeliazkov

Vice Minister of Transport, Information Technology and Communications of Bulgaria
- In office July 2009 – May 2011
- Prime Minister: Boyko Borisov

Personal details
- Born: 19 July 1972 (age 53) Pleven, Bulgaria
- Party: GERB

Ivaylo Moskovski (Bulgarian: Ивайло Московски) (born 19 July 1972 in Pleven) is a Bulgarian politician and former Minister of Transport, Information Technology and Communications in Bulgaria.

Ivaylo Moskovski was born on 19 July 1972 in Pleven, Bulgaria. He graduated Public Finances in UNWE and Financial Management in D.A.Tsenov Academy of Economics, Svishtov.

Ivaylo Moskovski was Deputy Minister of Transports, Information Technology and Communications and after Aleksadar Tsvetkov resigned was appointed Minister of Transport, Information Technology and Communications.

Moskovski's 4-year-old son, Kristian, was killed in a skidoo accident in the Bulgarian winter sports resort of Borovets in February 2018.

Moskovski offered his resignation as Transport Minister on 30 October 2018 following controversies relating to a deadly bus crash near Svoge, Bulgaria in which 20 people died.

On 17 December 2018 Moskovski was appointed Vice President Operations by the Black Sea Trade and Development Bank based in Thessaloniki.
