= Diana Kovacheva =

Bulgarian lawyer and politician (born 1975)

The Hon. Ms. Justice Diana Kovacheva
- Диана Ковачева
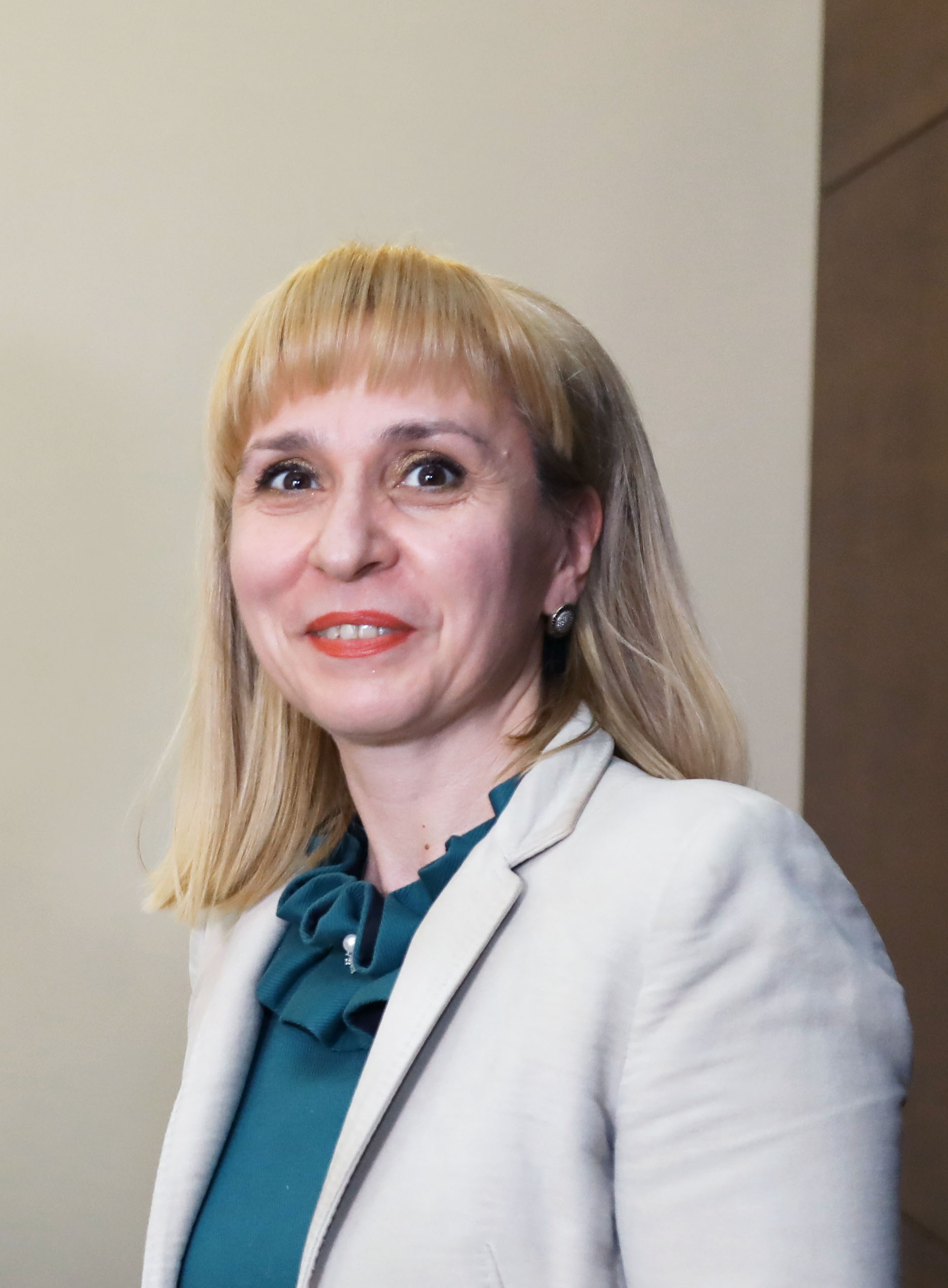
- Diana Kovacheva in 2023

Judge of the European Court of Human Rights
- Incumbent
- Assumed office 13 April 2024

National Ombudswoman
- In office 3 September 2019 – 10 April 2024
- President: Rumen Radev
- Prime Minister: See list: Boyko Borisov; Stefan Yanev; Kiril Petkov; Galab Donev; Nikolai Denkov; Dimitar Glavchev
- Preceded by: Maya Manolova

Minister of Justice
- In office 30 November 2011 – 21 February 2013
- President: Rosen Plevneliev
- Prime Minister: Boyko Borisov
- Preceded by: Margarita Popova
- Succeeded by: Dragomir Yordanov

Personal details
- Born: 16 July 1975 (age 51) Sofia, Bulgaria
- Education: Sofia University

Diana Kovacheva (Bulgarian: Диана Ковачева, born 16 July 1975) is a Bulgarian lawyer and politician, who served as justice minister from 30 November 2011 to 21 February 2013.

== Early life and education ==
Kovacheva was born in Sofia in 1975. She holds a law degree, which she received from Sofia Kliment Ohridski University. She also obtained a PhD in international law and international relations. In 2021 she became professor in International Public Law.

== Career ==
Kovacheva worked as a researcher at the Institute for Legal Sciences of the Bulgarian Academy of Sciences from 2000 to 2001. She was named executive director of Transparency International Bulgaria in August 2002. Her term lasted until 28 November 2011.

On 30 November 2011, she was appointed justice minister to the cabinet led by prime minister Boyko Borisov. She succeeded Margarita Popova, who was elected vice-president of Bulgaria. Kovatcheva served until mid-March 2013, since the cabinet resigned. She was succeeded by caretaker justice minister Dragomir Yordanov.

On 3 September 2019, Kovacheva was sworn in as Ombudsman of Bulgaria succeeding Maya Manolova

=== Awards ===
In June 2014 Diana Kovatcheva was awarded by Queen Elizabeth II with the Member of the Most Excellent Order of the British Empire for her tireless efforts in the fight against corruption, her work in the field of rule of law and her endeavor to bring transparency to the judiciary.
