= Lilyana Pavlova =

Bulgarian politician

- Лиляна Павлова
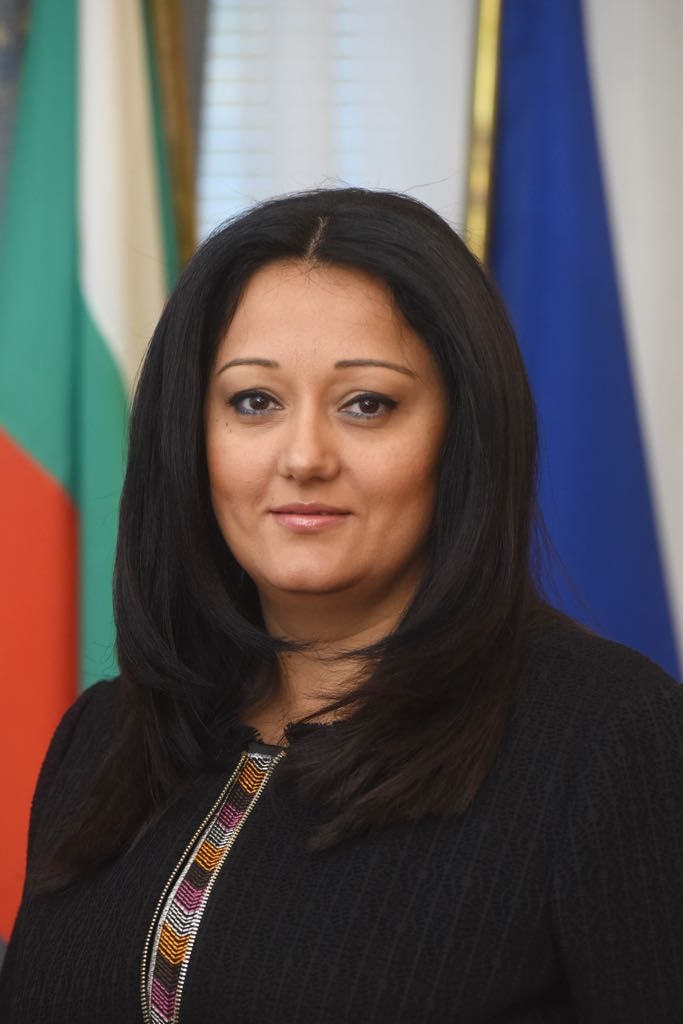
- Lilyana Pavlova in 2017
- Born: December 6, 1977 (age 48); Sofia, Bulgaria
- Education: University of National and World Economy
- Occupation: Politician
- Political party: GERB

Lilyana Pavlova Nikolova (Bulgarian: Лиляна Павлова Николова) (born December 6, 1977) is a Bulgarian politician from the GERB party who served as Minister of Regional Development and Public Works in Boyko Borisov's first and second cabinet and as Minister of Bulgaria's Presidency of the Council of the European Union in Borisov's third cabinet.

== Early life ==
Lilyana was born on December 6, 1977, in Sofia, Bulgaria. She completed her education at the University of National and World Economy. She holds a Doctor's degree of Economics.

== Career ==
Pavlova's political career began in September 1996 at the Institute for Development of Democracy. From April 2002 to August 2009, Pavlova was Head of Department in the National Fund Directorate in the Ministry of Finance, directly responsible for financial management and the Cohesion Fund for the Danube region. Her next big step was in August 2009 when she was appointed Deputy Minister of Regional Development and Public Works. This made her responsible for Directorates in charge of the management of European Union funds and programs. On September 9, 2011, she became Minister of Regional Development and Public Works in Boyko Borisov's first government. She held this post until the end of its term in 2013. She was next elected MP in the 43rd National Assembly by third multi-member constituency Varna.

Pavlova served as Minister of Regional Development and Public Works in Prime Minister Boyko Borisov's second government. She served as Minister of Bulgaria's Presidency of the Council of the European Union in Borisov's third government. In June 2019, Bulgaria's government nominated her for Vice-President of the European Investment Bank.

== Other activities ==
- European Bank for Reconstruction and Development (EBRD), Alternate Member of the Board of Governors

== Personal life ==
Pavlova is married to economics professor Plamen Nikolov and they have one daughter, Sofiya Nikolova.
