= Marin Raykov =

Bulgarian politician and diplomat

- Марин Райков
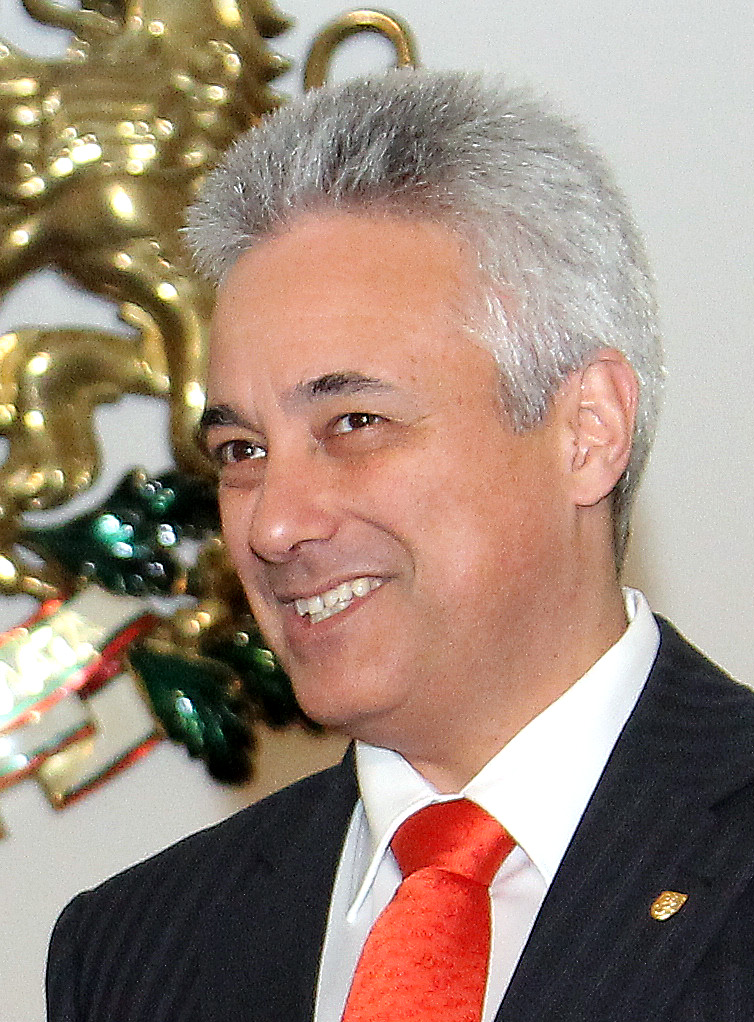
- Raykov in 2013

Prime Minister of Bulgaria
- In office 12 March 2013 – 29 May 2013
- President: Rosen Plevneliev
- Preceded by: Boyko Borisov
- Succeeded by: Plamen Oresharski

Minister of Foreign Affairs
- In office 12 March 2013 – 29 May 2013
- Prime Minister: Himself
- Preceded by: Nickolay Mladenov
- Succeeded by: Kristian Vigenin

Personal details
- Born: Марин Райков Николов; Marin Raykov Nikolov; 17 December 1960 (age 65) Washington, DC, United States
- Party: Bulgarian Communist Party (before 1989); Union of Democratic Forces (1989–2001); GERB (2009–2013); Independent (2013–present)
- Education: University of National and World Economy

Marin Raykov Nikolov (Bulgarian: Марин Райков Николов [mɐˈrin ˈrajkof]; born 17 December 1960) is a Bulgarian politician and diplomat who was appointed to serve as a caretaker Prime Minister of Bulgaria and minister of foreign affairs of Bulgaria on 12 March 2013 by Bulgarian president Rosen Plevneliev. He left office on 29 May 2013 with his interim deputy PM Ekaterina Zakharieva.

Raykov served as a deputy Foreign Minister in the governments of Ivan Kostov (1998–2001) and Boyko Borisov (2009–2010). From 2010 to 2013, he served as an ambassador of Bulgaria in France.

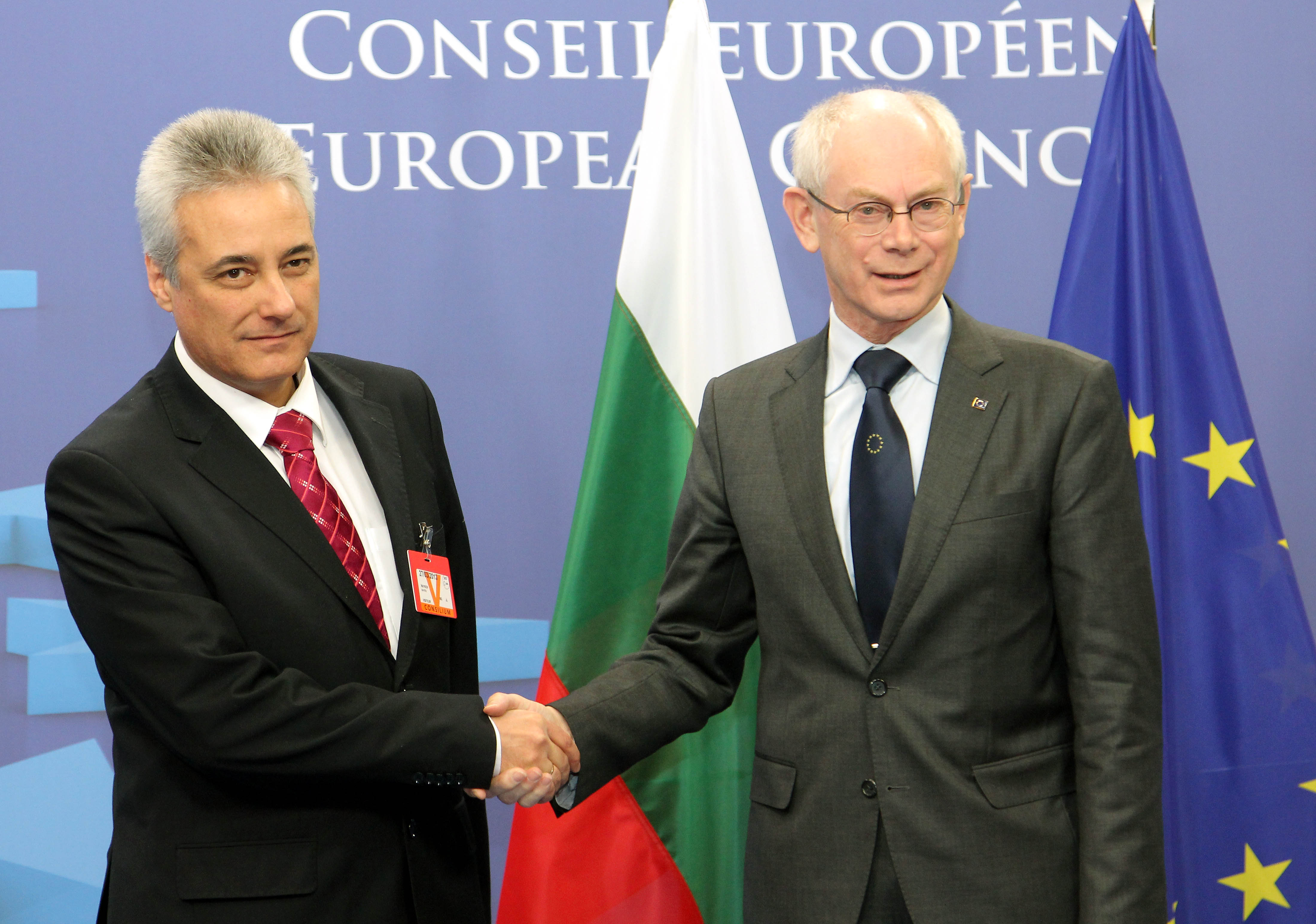
Raykov with President of the European Council Herman Van Rompuy in Brussels, 27 March 2013

Marin Raykov’s father, Rayko Nikolov, was himself a career diplomat.

== See also ==
- Raykov Government (88th Bulgarian Cabinet)
- List of foreign ministers in 2014
- Foreign relations of Bulgaria
- List of Bulgarians

Political offices
Preceded by Boyko Borisov	Prime Minister of Bulgaria; 2013	Succeeded by Plamen Oresharski
Preceded by Nickolay Mladenov	Minister of Foreign Affairs; 2013	Succeeded by Kristian Vigenin
Diplomatic posts
Preceded by Irina Bokova	Ambassador of Bulgaria to France; 2010–2013	Succeeded by Anguel Tcholakov
