= Daniel Valchev =

Bulgarian politician

- Даниел Вълчев
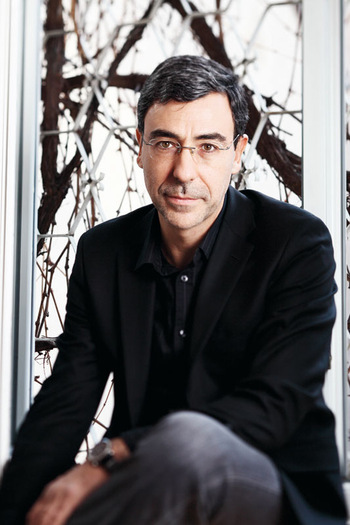

Deputy Prime Minister of Bulgaria (Note: Served alongside Ivailo Kalfin, Emel Etem Toshkova and Meglena Plugchieva)
- In office 17 August 2005 – 27 July 2009
- Prime Minister: Sergey Stanishev
- Preceded by: Nikolay Vasilev (Note: Vasilev, alongside Lydia Shuleva and Plamen Panaiotov)
- Succeeded by: Tsvetan Tsvetanov (Note: Tsvetanov, alongside Simeon Dyankov)

Minister of Education and Science
- In office 17 August 2005 – 27 July 2009
- Prime Minister: Sergey Stanishev
- Preceded by: Slavcho Bogoev
- Succeeded by: Yordanka Fandakova

Member of the National Assembly
- In office 5 July 2001 – 17 August 2005
- Constituency: 19th MMC - Ruse

Personal details
- Born: Daniel Vasilev Valchev; 10 August 1962 (age 64) Burgas, PR Bulgaria
- Party: NDSV (2003-2009)
- Other political affiliations: Bulgaria for Citizens Movement (2012-2014)
- Children: 3
- Education: Sofia University (LL.B, LL.M, PhD)
- Occupation: Politician; lecturer; lawyer; attorney

Daniel Vasilev Valchev is a Bulgarian politician who served as Deputy Prime Minister and Minister of Education and Science from 2005 to 2009. A member of the NDSV party, he was previously a Member of the National Assembly from 2001 to 2005. Valchev is now politically inactive and has served as the Dean of the Faculty of Law at Sofia University since 2019.
