= Sakskoburggotski Government =

Government of Bulgaria (2001–2005)

- 88th Cabinet of Bulgaria

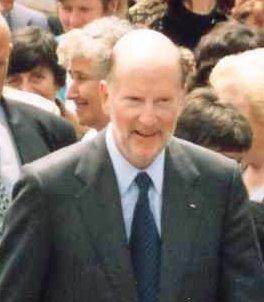
- Date formed: 24 July 2001
- Date dissolved: 16 August 2005

People and organisations
- Head of state: Petar Stoyanov (2001- 22 January 2002); Georgi Parvanov (22 January 2002 - 2005)
- Head of government: Simeon Saxe-Coburg-Gotha
- Deputy head of government: See list: Nikolai Vasilev (Economy) Lydia Shuleva (Labour and Social Policy) Kostadin Paskalev (2001–2002) (Ministry of Regional Development and Public Works) Plamen Panaiotov (2002–2005)
- Member parties: National Movement Simeon II; Movement for Rights and Freedoms; New Time (2004)
- Status in legislature: Coalition Government

History
- Election: 2001
- Legislature term: 39th National Assembly
- Outgoing formation: Electoral Defeat (2005)
- Predecessor: Kostov Government
- Successor: Stanishev Government

The eighty-eighth cabinet of Bulgaria, also known as the Sakskoburggotski Government and informally as the Tsar's cabinet, ruled from July 24, 2001 to August 16, 2005. Although the National Movement Simeon II won half the National Assembly seats in the 2001 parliamentary election, and therefore could have probably governed alone, a cabinet was formed as a coalition between the winners and the Movement for Rights and Freedoms (with the coalition holding 141 seats out of 240). Although not in a coalition with the Tsar's party, the Bulgarian Socialist Party held two cabinet posts as well. Their members sat as independents.

== Premiership ==
In foreign policy, the main priorities of the new government are Bulgaria's integration into European structures, NATO membership and maintaining close economic and political ties with the Republic of Turkey, the United States and the Russian Federation, as well as with the countries of the European Community. On 21 November 2002, at the Prague Summit of NATO Heads of State and Government, a formal invitation was sent to Bulgaria to join the Alliance. In the spring of 2003, the National Assembly decided on the participation of Bulgarian military units in the multinational forces for the reconstruction of Iraq. On March 29, 2004, at a ceremony held at the US Treasury Department, the Republic of Bulgaria and six other Eastern European countries were accepted as full members of NATO. The Treaty was ratified by the National Assembly on 31 March 2004.

Negotiations for the country's association with the European Union were also under way. The Republic of Bulgaria did not belong to the group of "ten" (Czech Republic, Slovenia, Slovakia, Lithuania, Latvia, Estonia, Poland, Hungary, Malta and Cyprus), which joined the EU on 1 May 2004, but by the spring of 2005, met some of the basic criteria for membership. All thirty negotiation chapters had been closed. An agreement between the representatives of the Republic of Bulgaria and the EU was signed on April 25, 2005 in Luxembourg. It set both the date for accession (January 1, 2007) and the financial assistance of 3.6 billion euros over three years, as well as the reforms that the country is committed to implementing in the coming months. The Luxembourg Treaty was ratified by the National Assembly on 11 May 2005.

The government carried out a large number of privatization deals and concession agreements. Some of them (the sale of BTC, the attempt to conclude a concession agreement for the Trakia highway, the replacement of Bozhurishte airport, etc.) created tension among Bulgarian society and distrust of the government. The cabinet was accused by the opposition of lowering sales prices, of lack of publicity in carrying out the deals and of failing to comply with the requirements for a competitive start in the sale of state property. Despite the relatively high rates of economic growth, a number of negative trends were observed in the Bulgarian economy. The foreign trade balance was negative. In 2003, $7 billion worth of products were exported and $9.3 billion were imported. Exports to Russia were symbolic. The external debt of private enterprises (EUR 3.3 billion) and banks (EUR 2.1 billion) was growing.

The four-year rule of Simeon Saxe-Coburg-Gotha's government was accompanied by significant changes in the country's political life. In early 2002, the BSP withdrew its support for the cabinet and became the strongest opposition party. Although not in power, the right failed to emerge from the crisis. Its split led to a sharp decline in its influence in the public life of the country. The largest number of supporters had three right-wing political formations: the Union of Democratic Forces, the Union of Free Democrats and Democrats for a Strong Bulgaria. The number of political parties in Bulgaria reached about 330, which unequivocally spoke of a deep crisis among the political elite.

In 2002, the Tsarists registered a new political formation. In 2004, followers of the New Time political movement seceded from it, forming a new party and a separate parliamentary group. Despite the split and the opposition's attempts to provoke early parliamentary elections (six unsuccessful no-confidence votes in the National Assembly), NMSS and MRF successfully served their four-year term in office.

In the 2005 elections, Simeon's NDSV party was defeated and became the second-largest in the country. This was a result of popular disappointment in the government's leadership, especially since the expectations were very high, with some even calling them unrealistic.

== Cabinet ==
=== Original composition ===
Ministry	Minister	Party
Prime Minister	Simeon Saxe-Coburg-Gotha	NDSV
Deputy Prime Minister and Minister of Economy	Nikolay Vasilev	NDSV
Deputy Prime Minister and Minister of Labour and Social Policy	Lydia Shuleva	NDSV
Deputy Ministry and Minister of Regional Development and Public Works	Kostadin Paskalev	Independent
Minister of Foreign Affairs	Solomon Passy	NDSV
Minister of Interior	Georgi Petkanov	NDSV
Minister of Education and Science	Vladimir Atanasov	NDSV
Minister of Finance	Milen Veltchev	NDSV
Minister of Justice	Anton Stankov	NDSV
Minister of Defence	Nikolay Svinarov	NDSV
Minister of Agriculture and Forestry	Mekhmed Dikme	DPS
Minister of Transport and Communications	Plamen Petrov	NDSV
Minister of Public Administration	Dimitar Kalchev	Independent
Minister of Environment and Water	Dolores Arsenova	NDSV
Minister Without Portfolio (In charge of emergency situations)	Nezhdet Mollov	DPS
Minister of Health	Bozhidar Finkov	NDSV
Minister of Culture	Bozhidar Abrashev	NDSV

Note: the two independents are functionaries of the Bulgarian Socialist Party.

=== Changes on December 22, 2001 ===
The government agency on Energy and Energy Resources is transformed into a ministry. Milko Kovachev (NDSV) is appointed its minister.

=== Changes on May 29, 2002 ===
Bulgaria's Chief Negotiator with the European Union, Meglena Kuneva, is given a cabinet post: the Ministry of European Affairs.

=== Changes on October 11, 2002 ===
The government agency on Youth and Sport is transformed into a ministry. Vasil Ivanov-Luchano (NDSV) is appointed its minister.

=== Changes on December 18, 2002 ===
Kostadin Paskalev is removed from the cabinet. Valentin Tserovski succeeds him as Minister of Regional Development and Public Works only (he does not become deputy Prime Minister).

=== Changes on July 17, 2003 ===
On July 17 parliament approved a major cabinet reshuffle. The move was to "optimiz[e] the government's work" according to foreign minister Solomon Passy. The move was announced against the backdrop of sliding approval ratings.

- Plamen Panaiotov (NDSV) is appointed deputy Prime Minister in charge of euro integration.
- Plamen Petrov is dismissed from cabinet.
- Nikolai Vasilev, keeping his position as deputy PM, moves to the Ministry of Transportation and Communications.
- Lydia Shuleva, also retaining her position as deputy PM, moves to the Ministry of Economy.
- Hristina Hristova (NDSV), former deputy, takes the head of the Ministry of Labour and Social Policy.
- Bozhidar Finkov and Vladimir Atanasov are dismissed from their cabinet posts (Health and Education) for failing to live up to the people's expectations. They are replaced by their deputies Slavcho Bogoev (NDSV) and Igor Damyanov (NDSV) respectively.
- Filiz Khyusmenova (DPS) is appointed Minister without Portfolio, replacing Nezhdet Mollov.

=== Changes on February 23, 2005 ===
On March 10, 2004 eleven MPs from the NDSV left to form a new political party: New Time. This left the NDSV with a minority. To fix the problem the NDSV-DPS coalition signed an agreement with New Time to keep the government in power until the elections in June. As part of the deal Miroslav Sevlievski (New Time) became Minister of Energy and Energy Resources.

- Lidia Shuleva is removed from cabinet so Milko Kovachev, formerly Minister of Energy and Energy Resources, can succeed her as Minister of Economy.
- Mekhmed Dikme is dismissed from his post as Agriculture Minister and succeeded by his deputy Nihat Kabil (DPS).
- Bozhidar Abrashev is dismissed from his post as Minister of Culture. The government agency on tourism is added to the ministry; and the portfolio is taken up by Nina Chilova (NDSV).

== See also ==
- History of Bulgaria since 1989
