= Kostov Government =

Government of Bulgaria (1997–2001)

- 87th Cabinet of Bulgaria

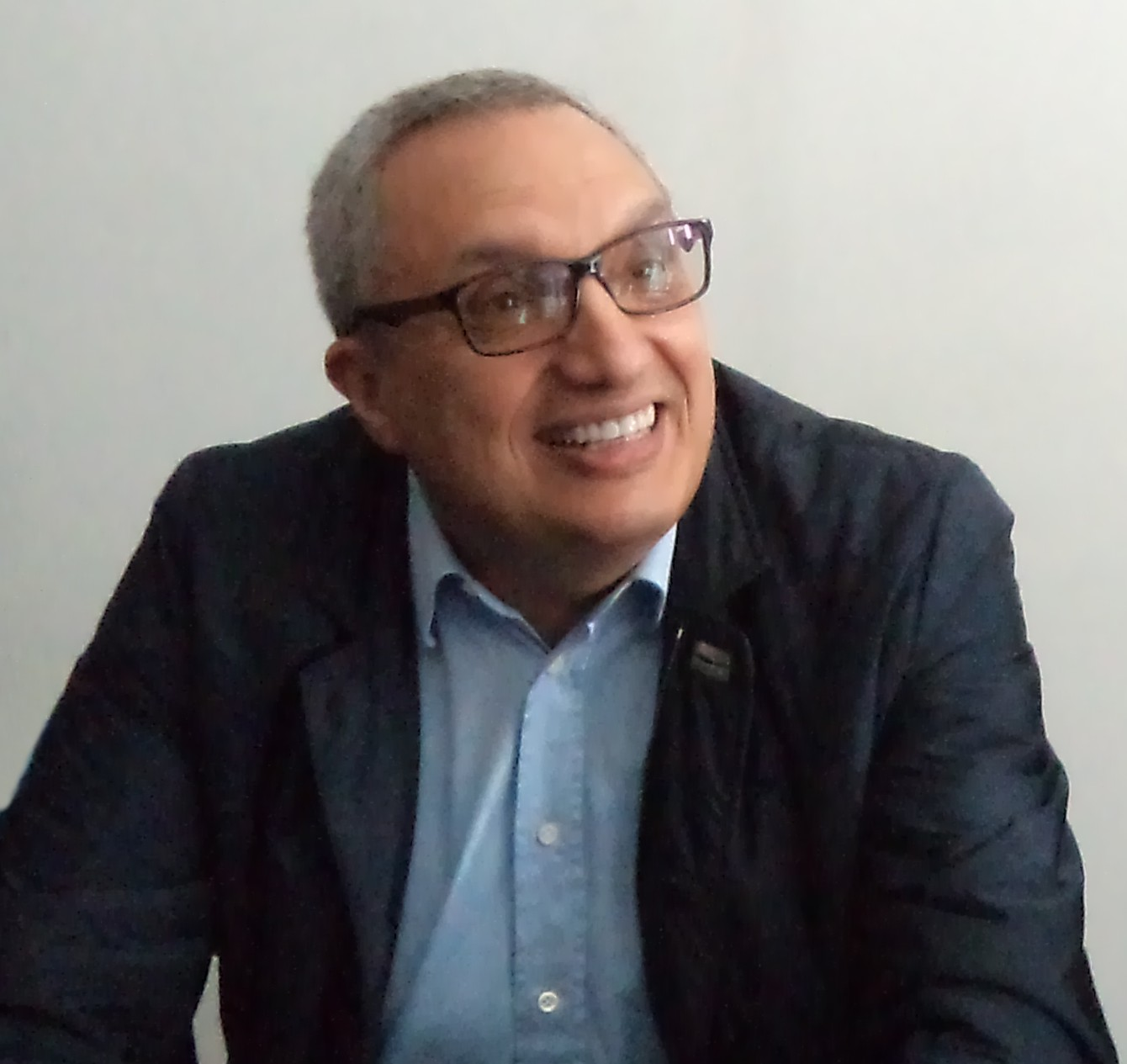
- Date formed: 21 May 1997
- Date dissolved: 24 July 2001

People and organisations
- Head of state: Petar Stoyanov
- Head of government: Ivan Kostov
- Deputy head of government: See list: Nikolai Vasilev (Economy) Lydia Shuleva (Labour and Social Policy) Kostadin Paskalev (2001-2002) (Ministry of Regional Development and Public Works) Plamen Panaiotov (2002-2005)
- Member parties: United Democratic Forces
- Status in legislature: Coalition Government

History
- Outgoing formation: Electoral Defeat (2001)
- Election: 1997
- Legislature term: 38th National Assembly
- Predecessor: Sofiyanski Government (Provisional)
- Successor: Sakskoburggotski Government

The eighty-seventh cabinet of Bulgaria (the Kostov Government) ruled from May 21, 1997 to July 24, 2001. The government was formed by the United Democratic Forces, an electoral alliance led by the Union of Democratic Forces, after they won a landslide victory in the 1997 parliamentary election winning 49.15% of the votes and 137 (out of 240) seats in the National Assembly. The cabinet was chaired by the UDF leader Ivan Kostov who shared the cabinet posts between his party and his allies. This was the largest margin of victory since the end of communism in 1990, to this day. Kostov's government was the first since 1990 to serve its entire four-year mandate.

== Background ==
In the previous parliamentary election (1994) the Bulgarian Socialist Party won a majority of the seats and the UDF was reduced to 69 seats. Up to that point in time the UDF had formed government only once, under Philip Dimitrov, and governed for one year only (1991-1992). The tide turned on the socialists, however, after the economic meltdown during the winter of 1996-1997 and the government was forced to step down. After declaring their intentions to form a new government, the UDF and other opposition parties staged mass rallies demanding snap elections. Eventually the Socialists bowed to the pressure and agreed. After a caretaker government was appointed in February, early parliamentary elections were scheduled for April, two years before otherwise scheduled. The result was a landslide victory for Ivan Kostov's electoral alliance.

== Premiership ==
Ivan Kostov and the cabinet headed by him were sworn in on May 21, 1997, and a month later (July 1, 1997) in order to stabilize the lev and the banking system, a currency board was introduced in the country (BGN 1,000 is equal to of 1 German mark). The BNB stopped lending to the treasury and banks, the annual interest rate was lowered to 7% and the banking system was rehabilitated. In June 1997, inflation was only 1.3 percent, a "Law for Sanctioning the Illegally Rich" was being prepared, and all members of the UDF National Executive Council (the leading party in the UDF coalition) were obliged to leave private, municipal and state-owned companies.

The Law on the Emblem of the Republic of Bulgaria was adopted (promulgated in issue 62 of the State Gazette of August 5, 1997).

In the autumn of 1997, the government intensified its activities on three main issues - land restitution, rapid privatization and liquidation of loss-making enterprises. By the spring of 2000, according to government estimates, more than 80% of state-owned enterprises had been privatized (according to the World Bank, 45%). The treasury receives less money than expected, and most companies fall into the hands of small foreign companies and labor management companies. The reasons for the problems with privatization are both its eight-year-late start-up (during which companies have been "drained", most of which have been at a loss since the communist era) and widespread corruption at all levels of government and the unstable situation in the country. . The result is huge debts of giants such as Kremikovtzi (included in the liquidation list by Videnov's government) and Agropolichim - Devnya and their sales for 1 dollar or 1 lev, respectively. Where businesses have maintained their financial stability and markets, new owners have repeatedly postponed their financial and social commitments through new agreements with the government.

The fact that almost none of them paid penalties for broken promises (new jobs, investments, etc.) raises suspicions of corruption in the state administration. Mass layoffs have led to high unemployment (17%), low incomes, shrinking internal markets and social tensions. The rating of the UDF government drops sharply, which is also evident in the local elections (autumn 1999) During the period 1998-2000, the government managed to partially deal with a number of important domestic political problems - the first seven-year plan for economic development of the country and the first national plan for regional development were adopted. The tax burden has been reduced, with more than BGN 600 million expected to remain with taxpayers in 2001. The implementation of the Energy Development Program until 2010 has started, as well as the functioning of the Health Insurance Fund. The problem with the nuclear safety of Kozloduy NPP has been solved.

On June 30, 1999, Ivan Kostov's government sold the debt-ridden BGA Balkan airline to Israeli entrepreneur Gad Zeevi. Shortly after the purchase, Zeevi suspended flights, and on October 29, 2002, the Sofia City Court declared the company bankrupt. Zeevi later ordered Bulgaria to pay him a penalty for non-compliance with the privatization contract (which was finally dropped according to a court ruling in 2012 ), while in Bulgaria an investigation is under way against the company's managers who have already left the country for draining it. In foreign policy, the government is pursuing a course of rapprochement with the European Union, the United States and their Balkan ally, Turkey. Bulgaria participates in NATO's initiatives on the peninsula and implements the recommendations for the reorganization of the Bulgarian Army, necessary for its future inclusion in the Pact. The most complicated problem that Bulgaria's foreign diplomacy has to solve during the period is the attitude towards the conflict in Yugoslavia. Despite the polarization of public opinion and the economic losses for the country, Ivan Kostov's cabinet and the National Assembly have come out in support of NATO strikes against Serbia. Refusal to provide air corridors to the Pact would doom Bulgaria to international isolation and minimize the chances of membership in the European Union. In foreign policy, the government is pursuing a course of rapprochement with the European Union, the United States and their Balkan ally, Turkey. Bulgaria participates in NATO initiatives on the peninsula and implements the recommendations on the reorganization of the Bulgarian Army, necessary for its future inclusion in the Pact. The most difficult problem that Bulgaria's foreign diplomacy has to solve during the period is the attitude towards the conflict in Yugoslavia. Despite the polarization of public opinion and the economic losses for the country, Ivan Kostov's cabinet and the National Assembly have come out in support of NATO strikes against Serbia. Refusal to provide air corridors to the Pact would doom Bulgaria to international isolation and minimize the chances of membership in the European Union.

Since 1999, the trust in the country and its institutions has been growing. Financial stabilization continues. All obligations of Bulgaria to the former socialist states have been settled. A large number of international agreements have been signed - the credit agency Standard and Poor's raises Bulgaria's rating to B + with positive prospects. The Parliamentary Assembly of the Council of Europe ceases to monitor Bulgaria. Bulgarian legislation is harmonized with European legislation. An agreement has been reached with Romania on the construction of a second bridge over the Danube. A great success for the government is the decision to remove Bulgaria from the negative visa list of the member states of the European Union .

Foreign trade has been liberalized: tariffs on industrial goods have been reduced from 15.25% in 1998 to 12.56% in 1999 and to 11% in 2000; Since 1999, Bulgaria has been trading at reduced tariffs with the Czech Republic, Slovakia and Slovenia, Poland, Hungary and Romania.

Following a meeting with George W. Bush (US President) and Dick Cheney (US Vice President), four days before the next parliamentary elections on June 13, 2001, despite warnings from the World Bank and Deputy Prime Minister Peter Jotev, Prime Minister Ivan Kostov signed a deal with American companies for construction of a new power plant on the site of TPP "Maritsa-East 1" and rehabilitation of TPP "Maritsa-East 3" (which will produce the most expensive electricity in the country, which the National Electric Company will be obliged to buy for 15 years after the start of operation of the plants). Maritza-Iztok 1 started operating at full capacity on December 30, 2011. In 2001, Kostov defended the project by being the largest foreign investment in Bulgaria and a landmark for potential future investors.

== Cabinet ==
=== Original Composition ===
Ministry	Minister	Party
Prime Minister	Ivan Kostov	UDF
Deputy Prime-Minister and Minister of Education and Science	Veselin Metodiev	DP
Deputy Prime-Minister and Minister of Industry	Alexander Bozhkov	UDF
Deputy Prime-Minister and Minister of Regional Development and Public Works	Evgeni Bakardzhiev	UDF
Minister of Foreign Affairs	Nadezhda Mihaylova	UDF
Minister of Interior	Bogomil Bonev	UDF
Minister of Finance	Muravey Radev	UDF
Minister of Justice and Euro-integration	Vasil Gotsev	DP
Minister of Defence	Georgi Ananiev	UDF
Minister of Labour and Social Policy	Ivan Neykov	UDF
Minister of Agriculture, Forestry and Agrarian Reform	Ventsislav Varbanov	BANU
Minister of Transport	Vilhelm Kraus	UDF
Minister of Public Administration	Mario Tagarinski	UDF
Minister of Environment	Evdokiya Maneva	UDF
Minister of Health	Petar Boyadzhiev	Independent
Minister of Culture	Emma Moskova	Independent
Minister of Tourism and Trade	Valentin Vasilev	UDF

=== Changes on December 21, 1999 ===
In December 1999 the National Security Agency released a report following a sweeping investigation, written by Tsvetlin Iovchev, outlining possible security threats. Michael Cherney, an Uzbekistan-born Israeli businessman, was expelled from the country and forbidden from reentering for 10 years for his ties to foreign criminal money-laundering schemes. Also, three diplomats from the Russian embassy were expelled from the country and their spy was arrested, accused of leaking classified documents to the Russians.

The following changes were made to the Cabinet:

- The Ministry of Transportation was transformed into the Ministry of Transportation and Communications. Antoni Slavinski (DP) was chosen to be the new minister.
- The Ministry of Agriculture, Forestry and Agrarian Reform was transformed into the Ministry of Agriculture, Forestry. Ventsislav Varbanov remained the Minister.
- The Ministry of Justice and Euro-integration was reorganized into the Ministry of Justice. Teodosy Symeonov (Ind) became the new minister.
- The Ministry of Industry and the Ministry of Tourism and Trade were merged to become the Ministry of Economy. The new minister was Petar Zhotev (Ind). He also became deputy Prime Minister, the only one to hold that office in the second half (1999-2001) of the government.
- Prime Minister Ivan Kostov takes over the Ministry of Public Administration.
- The Ministry of Regional Development and Public Works is taken over by Evgeni Chachev (Ind).
- Dimitar Dimitrov (DP) became the new Minister of Education and Science.
- Boyko Noyev (Ind) was appointed as the new Minister of Defence.
- Emanuyl Yordanov (?) was appointed as the new Minister of Interior.
- Ilko Semerdzhiev (?) was appointed as the new Minister of Health.
- Aleksander Pramatarski (DP) was appointed as a minister without portfolio.

== See also ==
- History of Bulgaria since 1989
