= Ivailo Kalfin =

Bulgarian politician

Ivaylo Kalfin
- Ивайло Калфин
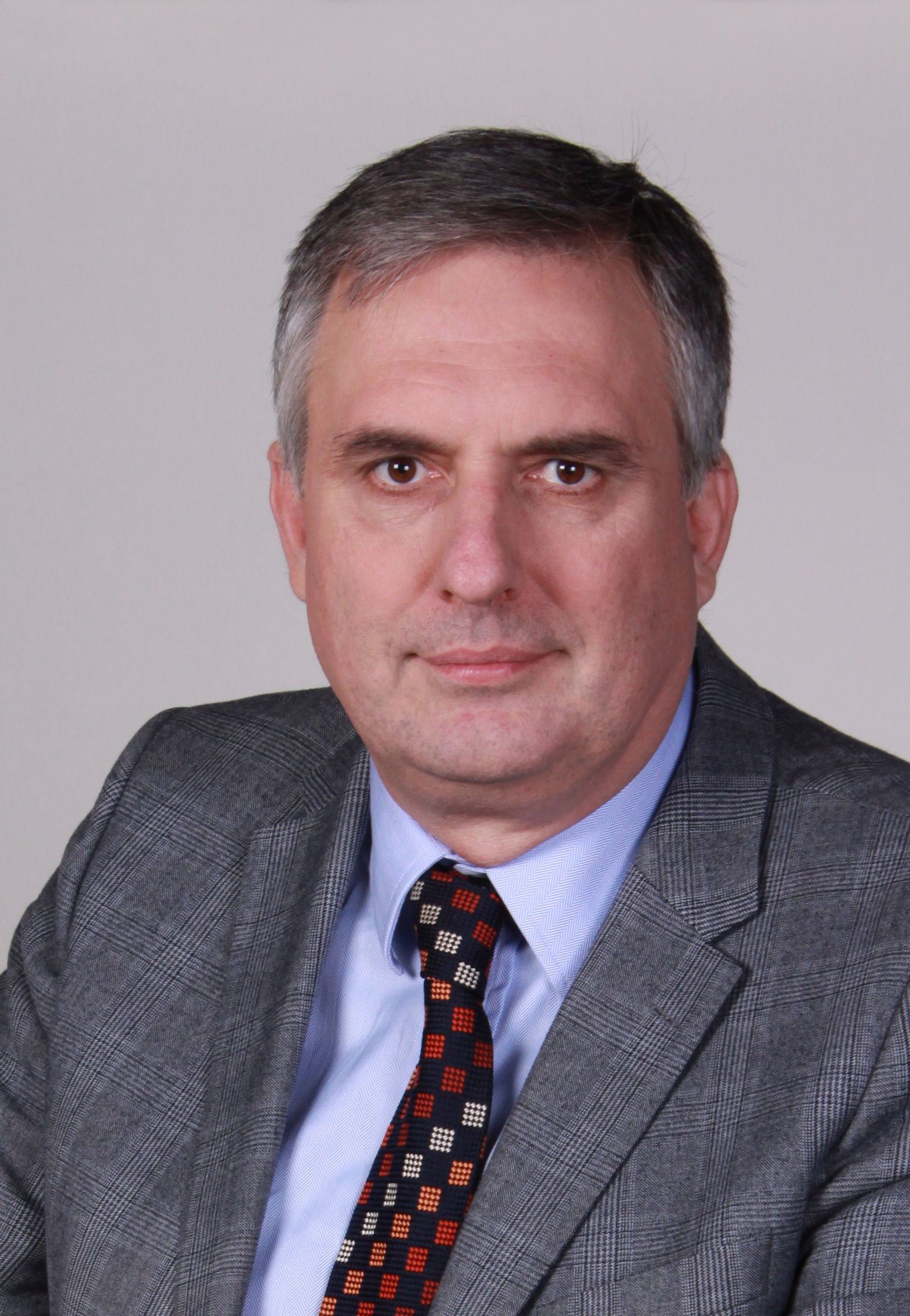
- Official portrait, 2009

Deputy Prime Minister of Bulgaria
- In office 7 November 2014 – 18 May 2016 Serving with Tomislav Donchev and Meglena Kuneva
- Prime Minister: Boyko Borisov
- Preceded by: Ekaterina Zakharieva; Hristo Ivanov
- Succeeded by: Vacant
- In office 17 August 2005 – 27 July 2009 Serving with Emel Etem Toshkova
- Prime Minister: Sergey Stanishev
- Preceded by: Nikolay Vasilev; Plamen Panayotov; Lydia Shouleva
- Succeeded by: Tsvetan Tsvetanov; Simeon Dyankov

Minister of Labour and Social Policy
- In office 7 November 2014 – 18 May 2016
- Prime Minister: Boyko Borisov
- Preceded by: Yordan Hristoskov
- Succeeded by: Zornitsa Rusinova

Member of the European Parliament for Bulgaria
- In office 14 July 2009 – 30 June 2014
- Preceded by: Kristian Vigenin
- Succeeded by: Sergey Stanishev

Minister of Foreign Affairs
- In office 17 August 2005 – 27 July 2009
- Prime Minister: Sergey Stanishev
- Preceded by: Solomon Passy
- Succeeded by: Rumiana Jeleva

Personal details
- Born: 30 May 1964 (age 62) Sofia, PR Bulgaria
- Party: Alternative for Bulgarian Revival
- Other political affiliations: Communist Party (1988–1990); Socialist Party (1990–1997; 2001–2014); Euro-Left (1997–2001)
- Children: 1
- Education: University of National and World Economy; Loughborough University

Ivaylo Georgiev Kalfin (Bulgarian: Ивайло Георгиев Калфин; born 30 May 1964) is a Bulgarian politician. A three-term deputy, he was Minister of Foreign Affairs of Bulgaria and Deputy Prime Minister from 2005 to 2009 in the Stanishev Cabinet. Kalfin was a Member of European Parliament between 2009 and 2014. Between 7 November 2014 and May 2016 he served as Deputy Prime-Minister of Bulgaria, and Minister of Labor and Social Policy in the Second Borisov Cabinet.

== Biography ==
Born in Sofia, Kalfin completed his high school studies in the Lycée Français de Sofia. He later received his higher education at the University of National and World Economy (1983–1988) and Loughborough University (1998–1999). His foreign language skills include English, French, Russian and Spanish. He is married and has a daughter.

Kalfin founded the Social Democrats National Movement and served as the deputy president of the Common Parliamentary Committee Bulgaria-European Union between 1995 and 1998. A deputy in the 37th (1994-1997), 38th (2000-2001) and 40th (since 2005) National Assembly of Bulgaria, Kalfin has been part of the Bulgarian National Bank's Consultative Council since 2004. He observed the elections in Kosovo in 2001 and 2004 as part of Organization for Security and Co-operation in Europe missions in the region and has also worked as a senior university lecturer and manager in several consulting companies.

Between 2002 and 2005, he was also an economic advisor to the President of Bulgaria, Georgi Parvanov. He became the Minister of Foreign Affairs and a Deputy Prime Minister in 2005. He is a member of Internet Society - Bulgaria.

== Relations with the Republic of Macedonia ==
On 24 July 2006, at the opening of a working conference with the heads of Bulgarian embassies and consulates abroad, Kalfin became the first Bulgarian Foreign Minister to publicly voice his opinion against the misinterpretation and misappropriation of Bulgarian history by the Republic of Macedonia, saying that:

We have declared our support for [the Republic of] Macedonia's [EU] membership. But I have to say immediately that it would not be normal for this support to be unconditional. There are criteria that have to be fulfilled. We would particularly much insist on the observance of the principles of good-neighbour relations and the lack of aggression towards the Bulgarian nation or history on behalf of the Macedonian authorities.

On 28 July 2006 Kalfin appealed to the Skopje authorities to replace the director of the Macedonian cultural and informational centre in Sofia Stefan Vlahov-Mitsov:

The Macedonian authorities should clearly prove that it is inadmissible for an official of a diplomatic representation abroad to participate in that country's political life.

His statement was provoked by Mitsov's alleged participation in the management of UMO Ilinden-Pirin, a controversial party largely regarded as Macedonist and anti-Bulgarian by the Bulgarian public.

== European Parliament ==
In the European Parliament, Kalfin served as:

- Vice-chairman of the Committee on Budgets,
- Member of the Special Committee on the Financial, Economic and Social Crisis
- Member of the Delegation for relations with Albania, Bosnia and Herzegovina, Serbia, Montenegro and Kosovo
- Substitute at the Committee on Budgetary Control
- Substitute at the Committee on Industry, Research and Energy
- Substitute at the Delegation for relations with the countries of South Asia

== See also ==
- List of foreign ministers in 2009
- Foreign relations of Bulgaria
- List of Bulgarians

Political offices
| Preceded by Solomon Passy | Minister of Foreign Affairs; 2005–2009 | Succeeded by Rumiana Jeleva |
