= Veselin Metodiev =

Bulgarian politician (born 1957)

- Веселин Методиев
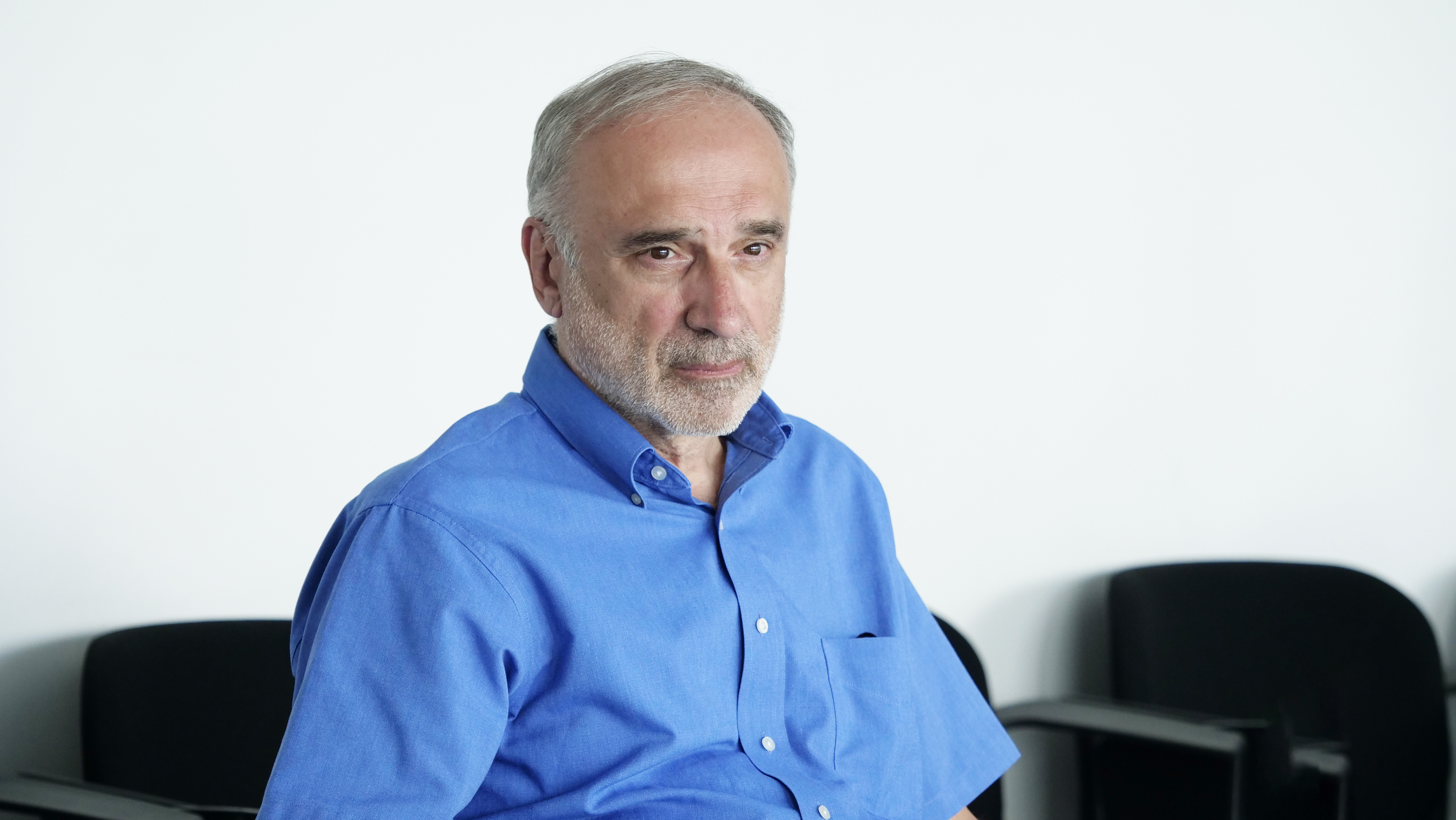

Deputy Prime Minister of Bulgaria
- In office 21 May 1997 – 21 December 1999 Serving with Evgeni Bakardzhiev
- Prime Minister: Ivan Kostov
- Preceded by: Alexander Bozhkov
- Succeeded by: Petur Zhotev

Minister of Education and Science
- In office 21 May 1997 – 21 December 1999
- Prime Minister: Ivan Kostov
- Preceded by: Ivan Lalov
- Succeeded by: Dimitur Dimitrov

Member of the National Assembly
- In office 11 July 2005 – 14 March 2013
- Constituency: 25th MMC - Sofia (2005-2009); 24th MMC - Sofia (2009-2013)
- In office 12 January 1995 – 21 May 1997
- Constituency: 25th MMC - Sofia

Personal details
- Born: Veselin Metodiev Petrov; 3 November 1957 (age 68) Silistra, PR Bulgaria
- Party: Democratic Party
- Education: Sofia University

Veselin Metodiev Petrov (Bulgarian: Веселин Методиев Петров) (born 3 November 1957, in Silistra) is a Bulgarian politician, member of Parliament & deputy chairman of Democrats for a Strong Bulgaria. He was Deputy Prime Minister and Minister of Education from 1997 until 1999 under Prime Minister Ivan Kostov.

Veselin Metodiev graduated in history from Sofia University in 1979 and after graduation worked in the Bulgarian General department of archives until 1993, in which he rose to head in 1992. He taught history in New Bulgarian University, of which he was also vice-rector in 1994. He was vice-chairman of the Democratic Party (Bulgaria) from 1995 till 2001 and Member of Parliament in the 37th and 38th National Assemblies. He was Deputy Prime Minister and Minister of Education from May 21, 1997, until December 21, 1999, in the government of the Union of Democratic Forces (UDF).

In 2004, he was part of a group of parliament members led by Ivan Kostov, to leave the UDF and establish a new political force, Democrats for a Strong Bulgaria (DSB), of which Veselin Metodiev was elected Vice Chairman. He is a Member of Parliament in the 40th National Assembly since 2005, and as such also a chairman of the parliamentary State Administration Affairs Committee and member of the Budget and Finance Committee.

In 2006, he was proposed by DSB as a joined right-wing presidential candidate for the 2006 presidential elections, but lost to Nedelcho Beronov due to lack of support of the remaining right-wing political parties.

In the 2009 Bulgarian parliamentary election, Veselin Metodiev was elected for Member of the 41st National Assembly from the 24-SOFIA 2 constituency, as a candidate of the Blue Coalition. In the National Assembly he is a member of the Legal Affairs Committee and the Education, Science, Children, Youths and Sports Committee.

== Sources ==
- https://web.archive.org/web/20061211112121/http://dsb.bg/display.php?page=19 (Dead Link)
- http://old.omda.bg/bulg/news/personal/metodiev.htm
- http://www.parliament.bg/?page=ns&lng=en&nsid=3&action=show&did=1011
