= Meglena Plugchieva =

Meglena Pluglichieva
- Меглена Плугличиева

Deputy Prime Minister of Bulgaria
- In office 24 April 2008 – 27 July 2009 Serving with Ivaylo Kalfin, Emel Etem Toshkova and Daniel Valchev
- Prime Minister: Sergei Stanishev
- Preceded by: Nikolay Vasilev; Lydia Shuleva; Kostadin Paskalev
- Succeeded by: Tsvetan Tsvetanov; Simeon Djankov

Member of the National Assembly
- In office 14 July 2009 – 31 May 2012
- Constituency: 19th MMC – Ruse
- In office 12 January 1995 – 19 April 2001

Deputy Minister of Environment and Water
- Prime Minister: Simeon Saxe-Coburg-Gotha
- Minister: Kostadin Paskalev

Personal details
- Born: 12 February 1956 (age 70) Balchik, PR Bulgaria
- Party: Independent
- Other political affiliations: BSP (until 2012)
- Education: Forestry-Technical University
- Occupation: Politician; Diplomat

Meglena Plugchieva is a former Bulgarian Deputy Prime Minister, ambassador and member of the Bulgarian National Assembly from the Socialist Party. She was Ambassador to Montenegro from 2019 to 2022.

== Early life ==
Plugchieva was born on 12 February 1956 in Balchik, which was then part of the People's Republic of Bulgaria. She has a degree in forest management and environmental studies at the University of Forestry, Sofia. She later, in 1989, defended her doctoral dissertation in "Ecology of Forests".

Her first position was in 1981 when she became an inspector for the Regional Inspectorate of Environmental Protection in Varna, and in 1990 she was appointed Head of the Foreign Relations Department of the National Forestry Administration.

== Career ==
She became a member of the Parliament of Bulgaria in 1995, where she served for one term until 2001. From 2001 to 2004, Plugchieva was Deputy Minister of Agriculture and Forestry, where she was in charge of European integration.

Nicknamed “Iron Meggy”, she was recalled from Germany after serving as ambassador to the country in 2008 “to clean up widespread corruption and misuse of European Union funds.”

Puglicheva was appointed as a Foreign Policy advisor to Caretaker Prime Minister Dimitar Glavchev in 2024. On the 24th of April, Pluglicheva resigned from her position. Pluglicheva justified her decision by referencing Glavchev's decision to assume the position of Foreign Minister along with his duties as Prime Minister, which she opposed.

== Personal life ==
She speaks German, Russian, and English. She is married with two children.
