= Sirishtnik =

Sirishtnik Сирищник
- Village
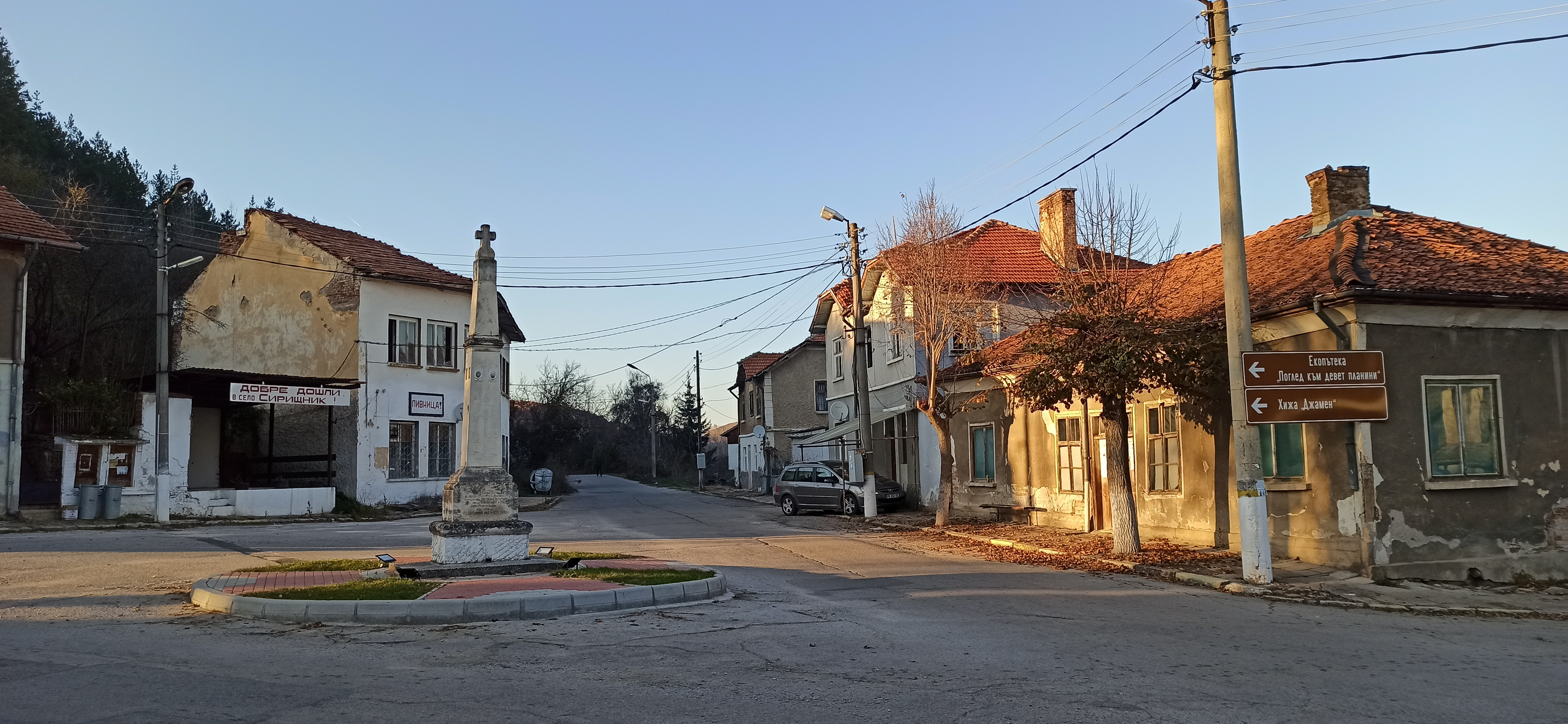

- Location within Bulgaria
- Coordinates: 42°34′17″N 22°48′47″E
- Country: Bulgaria
- Oblast: Pernik
- Opština: Kovachevtsi

Government
  - Mayor (Municipality): Vasil Stanimirov (BSP)

Area
  - Total: 20.106 km^{2} (7.763 sq mi)
- Elevation: 742 m (2,434 ft)

Population (2024)
  - Total: 371
  - Density: 18.5/km^{2} (47.8/sq mi)
- Postal code: 2450
- Area code: 07727
- Vehicle registration: РК

Sirishtnik (Bulgarian: Сирищник [ˈsiriʃtnik]) is a village in western Bulgaria, part of Kovachevtsi municipality, Pernik Province. It lies 25 km west of Pernik, at 42°34′N 22°49′E, 742 metres above sea level. As of 2005, it had a population of 268 and the mayor was Plamen Yanev. The village is situated on the banks of the Svetlya River, a tributary of the Struma.

Sirishtnik is the birthplace of former Bulgarian President Georgi Parvanov, who, while born there, grew up in the neighbouring village of Kosacha, from where his mother and father stem.

== Etymology ==
Sirishtnik was first mentioned in 1570 as Serishnik and as Sirishnik in 1576. The name is derived from the hydronym Sirishte and the Slavic suffix –nik. Sirishte is from the root sir, related to the Old Bulgarian adjective СЪІРЪ (syr, "wet, juicy, damp, watery"), thus it has the meaning of "wet place". The locals tie the name to the well-developed in the past animal husbandry and cheese (sir or sirene) production, but this is perceived as folk etymology due to the loss of the word's original meaning.
