= Meglena Kuneva =

Bulgarian politician

- Меглена Кунева
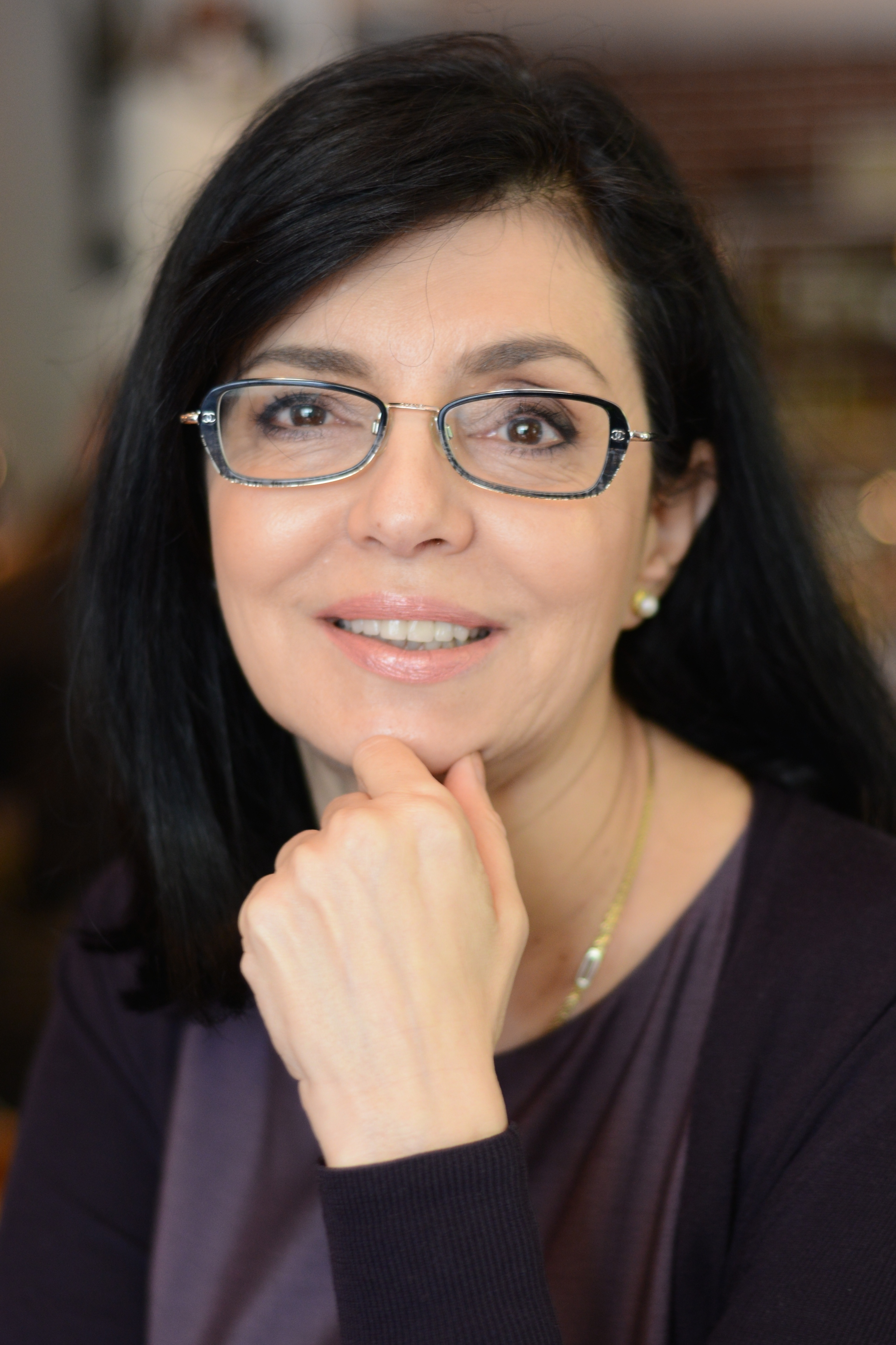
- Kuneva in 2014

Deputy Prime Minister of Bulgaria
- In office 7 November 2014 – 27 January 2017 Serving with Tomislav Donchev and Ivailo Kalfin
- Prime Minister: Boyko Borisov
- Preceded by: Ekaterina Zakharieva; Hristo Ivanov
- Succeeded by: Stefan Yanev

Minister of Education and Science
- In office 3 February 2016 – 27 January 2017
- Prime Minister: Boyko Borisov
- Preceded by: Todor Tanev
- Succeeded by: Nikolay Denkov

Minister of the European Union Affairs
- In office 7 November 2014 – 27 January 2017
- Prime Minister: Boyko Borisov
- Preceded by: Iliana Tsanova
- Succeeded by: Malina Krumova
- In office 29 May 2002 – 21 December 2006
- Prime Minister: Simeon Sakskoburggotski; Sergey Stanishev
- Preceded by: Position established
- Succeeded by: Gergana Passy

European Commissioner for Consumer Protection
- In office 1 January 2007 – 9 February 2010
- President: José Manuel Barroso
- Preceded by: Markos Kyprianou (Health and Consumer Protection)
- Succeeded by: John Dalli (Health and Consumer Policy)

Leader of the Bulgaria for Citizens Movement
- In office 1 July 2012 – 4 April 2017
- Preceded by: Position established
- Succeeded by: Dimitar Delchev

Personal details
- Born: 22 June 1957 (age 69) Sofia, PR Bulgaria
- Party: Bulgaria for Citizens Movement
- Other political affiliations: NDSV (2001-2012)
- Spouse: Andrey Pramov
- Education: Sofia University; Oxford University

Meglena Shtilianova Kuneva (Bulgarian: Меглена Щилиянова Кунева; born 22 June 1957) is a Bulgarian and EU politician.

== Early life and education ==
Born in Sofia, Kuneva is descended from a Catholic family from the town of Rakovski. She graduated in Law from Sofia University in 1981, and in 1984 she became a Doctor of Law. She worked as a journalist for the Law Programme of the Bulgarian National Radio while being an assistant professor at Sofia University. As an anchor, she participated in various campaigns related to human rights, such as the abolition of the death penalty, which still existed at that time in the country.

In 1990 she took a job as Senior Legal Advisor at the Council of Ministers and held it until 2001. In the meantime Kuneva specialized in Foreign Affairs and Environmental Law at Georgetown University and the University of Oxford.

== Political career ==
=== Career in national politics ===
In June 2001 Kuneva was elected a deputy (Member of Bulgarian Parliament) as a founding member of the Liberal Simeon II National Movement (NDSV) party. In August 2001 Kuneva left her position in the Bulgarian parliament because she was appointed Deputy Minister of Foreign Affairs and Chief Negotiator of the Republic of Bulgaria with the European Union. She represented the Bulgarian Government in the Convention on the Future of Europe (the European Convention), which designed the EU Constitutional Treaty (the European Constitution).

In May 2002 Kuneva was appointed Bulgaria's first Minister of European Affairs in the government of former Tsar Simeon Sakskoburggotski. She held that job even after the 2005 parliamentary elections, when NDSV became a junior partner in the Bulgarian Socialist Party-dominated coalition government of Sergey Stanishev – the only minister of the former cabinet to retain her post.

=== European Commissioner for Consumer Protection ===
On 26 October 2006 Kuneva was nominated to be Bulgaria's first member of the European Commission. European Commission President Jose Manuel Durao Barroso assigned her the portfolio of Consumer Protection. Kuneva was decisively approved by the European Parliament on 12 December 2006 with 583 votes "in favour", 21 votes "against" and 28 votes "abstentions". She commenced her mandate as EU Commissioner on 1 January 2007, when Bulgaria officially joined the EU. In January 2007 Meglena Kuneva took an Oath as a European Commissioner at the European Court in Luxembourg.

During her term in office, Kuneva was interested in online data collection (of personal data), profiling and behavioral targeting, and in particular is looking for "enforcing existing regulation on the Internet and to regulate where adequate response to consumer concerns on the issue of data collection".

=== Return to national politics ===
In 2012 Kuneva ran as an independent presidential candidate, getting 14% of the votes.

Later that year she founded a political party Bulgaria for Citizens movement, which in 2014 secured places in the parliaments as part of the bigger right centrist alliance Reformist bloc. Kuneva was elected member of parliament and then became a Deputy Prime Minister, responsible for foreign affairs, regugee agency and data protectio unit. She also had an oversight of the human trafficking commission and the newly created anticorruoption body.

In early 2016 Kuneva took over the Ministry of Education and Science in a time the education system in Bulgaria was going through an overreaching reform.

=== Council of Europe ===
In 2018 Kuneva was appointed head of the EU Delegation to the Council of Europe, where she collaborated to establish a common European stance in conjunction with the Council of Europe and optimal coordination between the two organizations.

In 2024, Kuneva was her country's candidate to succeed Dunja Mijatović as the Council of Europe's Commissioner for Human Rights; in a vote by the Parliamentary Assembly of the Council of Europe, she ultimately lost against Michael O'Flaherty.

== Other activities ==
- European Council on Foreign Relations (ECFR), Member
- Vick Foundation, Member of the Jury for the 2008 Bulgarian Novel of the Year

== Political positions ==
In October 2013, Kuneva announced her opposition to the ban on land sale to foreigners that was voted by the Bulgarian Parliament. This closely matches the stand the European Commission has taken on the matter.

In December 2013 she said that "she felt more pity than anger toward" Plamen Oresharski because he is not the real decision maker in the Council of Ministers.

== Personal life ==
Meglena Kuneva is married to financier Andrey Pramov, a son of the secretary of the Central Committee of the Bulgarian Communist Party (1962–1978), and they have one son – Aleksandar.

In addition to her native Bulgarian, she is fluent in English, French, and Russian. Kuneva's hobby is listening to classical music.

== See also ==
- Barroso Commission
- Bulgarian membership of the European Union

Political offices
New office	Bulgarian European Commissioner; 2007–2010	Succeeded by Kristalina Georgieva
Preceded by Markos Kyprianou as European Commissioner for Health and Consumer Protection	European Commissioner for Consumer Protection; 2007–2010	Succeeded by John Dalli as European Commissioner for Health and Consumer Policy
