= Petar Beron (politician) =

Bulgarian politician and entomologist

Petar Beron Петър Кирилов Берон
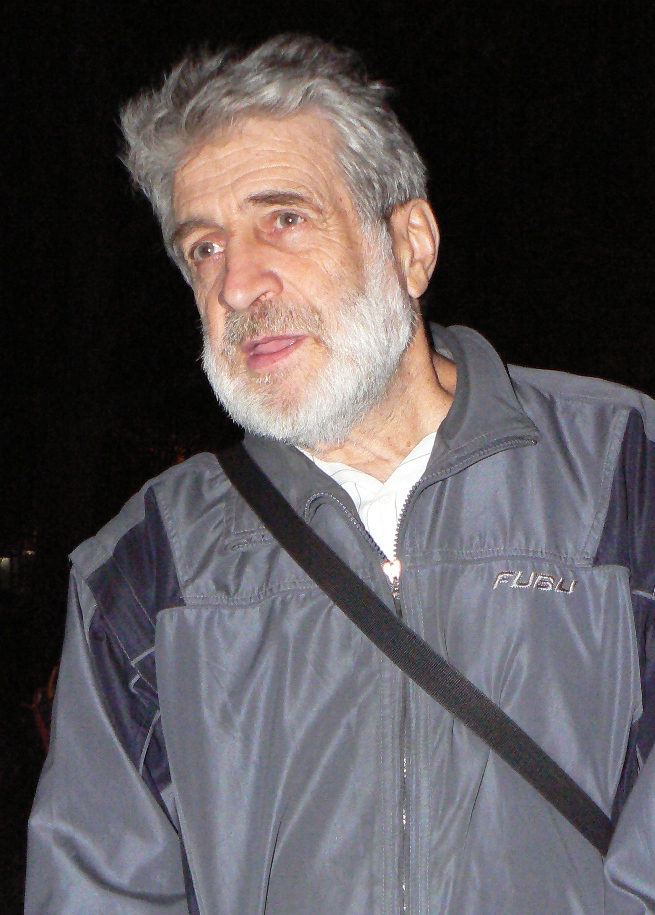

Chairman of the Union of Democratic Forces
- In office 1990
- Preceded by: Zhelyu Zhelev
- Succeeded by: Philip Dimitrov

Personal details
- Born: 14 March 1940 (age 85) Sofia, Bulgaria

Petar Beron (Bulgarian: Петър Берон), born 14 March 1940 in Sofia, Bulgaria, is a Bulgarian academic and politician. He was leader of the United Democratic Forces (SDS) in from August 1990 to 4 December 1990 (heading the second-largest political party at the time). He was a vice-presidential candidate in 1992 and a presidential candidate in 2001 and 2006.

== Biography ==
Petar Beron was born in Sofia on 14 March 1940. He graduated from the Biology-Geology-Geography Department of the Kliment Ohridski University in Sofia.

Beron is fluent in Bulgarian, Russian, English and French.

== Academic career ==
From 1963 up to 1969 he worked as a biologist at the Institute of Zoology with the Bulgarian Academy of Sciences, becoming a research fellow between 1969 and 1978. He was then promoted to Senior Research Fellow.

== Political career ==
=== Union of Democratic Forces ===
Beron was a founding member and secretary of the SDS (a coalition of multiple opposition groups) when it was formed on 7 December 1989. He was elected to the 7th Grand National Assembly in the first democratic elections in 1990.

The SDS leader, Zhelyu Zhelev, was elected president by the Grand National Assembly on August 1, 1990 and so Beron was elected to succeed him as chairman of the party. His tenure was relatively short lived. On December 4 he stepped down after admitting that he had worked as a police informer under the old regime. Beron was one of 70 MPs who were named in secret documents as having spied for the state security. Evidence was uncovered that he was a police informant code-named Bontcho who kept tabs on his colleagues for the secret police. In his defense he insisted that his police activities served the state and not the Communist Party.

He was one of the few people who signed the Constitution of Bulgaria.

Beron left the Union of Democratic Forces is 1991.

=== Vice-Presidential Bid, 1992 ===
In the January 1992 presidential elections Beron was the running mate of George Ganchev - leader of the Bulgarian Business Bloc. The duo finished third with 853,044 votes (16.8%).

=== Presidential Bid, 2001 ===
Beron ran for president in 2001 with Stoyan Andreev (from the Bulgarian Union) as his running mate. They finished sixth with only 31,394 votes (1.1%).

=== Back in Parliament 2005-2009 ===
Beron was elected to the National Assembly in the 2005 parliamentary election under the ticket of the new nationalist party - Attack. He split from the party in 2006.

=== Presidential Bid, 2006 ===
Beron ran one last time for president - as an independent this time - in 2006 with Stela Bankova as his running mate. They finished fifth with only 21,812 votes (0.79%).
