= Bogomil Bonev =

Bulgarian politician

Bogomil Angelov Bonev (born September 18, 1957) is a Bulgarian politician, Minister of Interior of Bulgaria between 1997 and 1999.

== Biography ==
=== Early years and police career ===
Bogomil Bonev was born on September 18, 1957, in Radomir. He graduated Radmir Electronics Technical High School with a golden medal in 1977. After serving time as a soldier in the School for Officers from the reserve in Pleven, he graduated the Higher Officers Academy of the Ministry of Interior in 1981, being the top graduate of that year. For this reason, in spite of the existing practice at that time, he was appointed directly in the Criminal Department of the Sofia Police Directorate, where only very successful candidates are usually appointed after a long and prominent career in the lower level police departments. He served at this position from 1981 to 1990. In this department he worked in the position of a police inspector, dealing with heavy crimes. He has been promoted many times in position and rank for the successful solution of a number of cases involving murder and vault breaking.

He graduated with distinction his second university education in 1987 in the Law Department of the Saint Kliment Ohridski Sofia University.

=== Political career ===
Bogomil Bonev became a member of Bulgarian Communist Party in 1975 at the age of 18.

In 1990 (at the time of political changes in Bulgaria) he was reappointed on his own request in the position of an investigator of heavy crimes. Bonev was appointed Director of the Sofia Police Directorate of the Ministry of Interior in 1991 and shortly after that he became Chief Secretary of the Ministry of Interior in the government of Philip Dimitrov. At this position he was the youngest general, promoted to this rank by President of Bulgaria Zhelyu Zhelev. After the end of the fall of Philip Dimitrov's government, Bogomil Bonev resigned from the position of Chief Secretary of the Ministry of Interior on his own request. He started his legal practice and worked as a counselor of the parliamentary group of the Union of the Democratic Forces on national security issues.

In January 1997 he became Secretary on National Security Issues to the newly elect President Petar Stoyanov.

==== Minister of Interior ====
In February 1997 Bogomil Bonev was appointed Minister of Interior in the temporary government with Stefan Sofiyanski as Prime Minister. After a very successful fight against organized crime Bogomil Bonev was appointed in the same position in the cabinet of Ivan Kostov, which was the second government of the democratic forces in R. Bulgaria. Thanks to Bogomil Bonev all the 56 criteria of the "Budapest process" were then met and this made it possible for Bulgaria to be taken out of the negative Schengen visa list in accordance with the unanimous decision of the Ministers of Interior of the member states of the European Community. Bonev introduced then the first national DNA laboratory in Central and Eastern Europe and AFP–an automated dactiloscopic system. He summoned a committee of experts from the FBI in the USA for their implementation. In his capacity of Minister of Interior, Bonev created the organization for and started the implementation of the new ID documents, which are even now assessed as the ones with the best defense in Europe. The most up-to-date information in the world on the defense of ID documents was used for their manufacture. In the meantime a competition was held, which was won by HP and Cappelen–Austria for the sum of 80 million leva. Yet, the Bulgarian state did not pay any money for this thanks to the terms of the competition. This is one of the rare cases in Europe when such a competition is held without arising any doubts of corruption.

In the end of 1999, after the European Committee adopted the resolution for the removal of the visa regime for Bulgaria, Ivan Kostov, Prime Minister at that time, decided to get rid of the Minister of Interior Bogomil Bonev because the latter had a considerably higher rating in society than the Prime Minister himself and his government. The intrigues, created by Atanas Atanasov, Director of the former State Security agency at that time, contributed to this. Atanas Atanasov is at present a key member of Ivan Kostov's new party. At the time when Ivan Kostov was Prime Minister, Atanasov wrote a report, which officially claimed to be directed against corruption within Ivan Kostov's government but was in fact concealing it. It was so because nothing was mentioned in this report about the corruptive privatization, carried out by Kostov himself, which did away with the official Bulgarian national airlines Balkan and gave strategic industries to Russian companies, some of which have been declared connected with the mafia.

=== Presidential elections in 2001 ===
In 2001, Bonev ran for President in the presidential elections and received 19% (almost 600 000 votes) in spite of the false and unfounded accusations used by Petar Stoyanov, the President at that time, which cost Stoyanov the elections; he failed to manage to the run offs. This is something no representative of the opposition at present has achieved up to the moment.

=== Law career ===
After that Bogomil Bonev worked as a lawyer. He has been consultant to world famous companies like Philip Morris in the fight against counterfeit production. In 2009 he was appointed Executive director of the International Plovdiv Fair company. Bogomil Bonev has been President of the Bulgarian Equestrian Federation for 10 years.

== Family ==
He is married to the popular Bulgaria actress, singer-songwriter and TV journalist Nona Yotova since 2006.
