= Vilhelm Kraus =

Bulgarian politician (1949–2020)

Personal details
- Born: 22 April 1949 Sofia, Bulgaria
- Died: 5 June 2020 (aged 71) Sofia, Bulgaria
- Profession: Politician

Vilhelm Botyov Kraus (Bulgarian: Вилхелм Ботьов Краус) (22 April 1949 – 5 June 2020) was a Bulgarian politician who served as Minister of Transport in the Kostov Government between 1997 and 1999.

== Life ==
Kraus was born in Sofia and completed his university studies in the Technical University in the capital, specializing in automobile transport exploitation.

In the 1990s, he served as vice-mayor of Sofia.

After retiring from his political career, he became a businessman.
