= Sofiyanski Government =

Government of Bulgaria (Feb–May 1997)

Raykov Government
- 86th Cabinet of Bulgaria
- Date formed: February 12, 1997
- Date dissolved: May 21, 1997

People and organisations
- Head of state: President Petar Stoyanov
- Head of government: Stefan Sofiyanski
- Status in legislature: Caretaker Government

History
- Predecessor: Videnov Government
- Successor: Kostov Government

The eighty-sixth Cabinet of Bulgaria was a caretaker technocratic government set up by President Petar Stoyanov following the resignation of the Videnov government. The government, headed by Prime Minister Stefan Sofiyanski, ruled from February 12, 1997 to May 21, 1997, when the new cabinet took office.

== See also ==
- History of Bulgaria since 1989
