= Muravey Radev =

Bulgarian politician

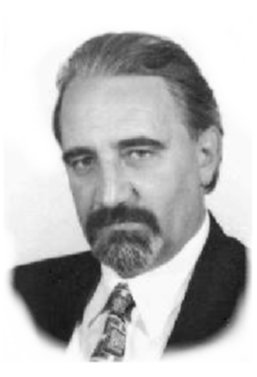

Personal details
- Born: 6 May 1947 (age 78) Sofia, Bulgaria
- Profession: Politician

Muravey Georgiev Radev (Bulgarian: Муравей Георгиев Радев) (born 6 May 1947) is a Bulgarian politician who served as Minister of Finance in the Kostov government between 1997 and 2001.

== Life ==
Born in Sofia, Radev completed his university studies in Varna, specializing in the economics of industry. In the 1990s, he became a member of the UDF. He has been elected to three National Parliaments.

In 2004, he was one of the founders (alongside Ivan Kostov) of the DSB.

Radev is married and has two children.

== Allegations of corruption and abuse of power ==
In 2002, Bulgaria’s Prosecutor-General initiated investigations into several high-profile ministers, including former Finance Minister Muravey Radev, on suspicion of corruption or abuse of office. Justice Minister Anton Stankov on 27 June 2002, accused the Prosecutor-General Nikola Filchev of persecuting Radev for political ends. No subsequent developments — such as official charges, trials, convictions, or substantiated findings — followed, as the Prosecutor-General was changed.
