= 2006 Bulgarian presidential election =

- 22 October 2006 (first round); 29 October 2006 (second round)
- Turnout: 44.11% (first round) ▲2.48pp 42.62% (second round) ▼12.30pp
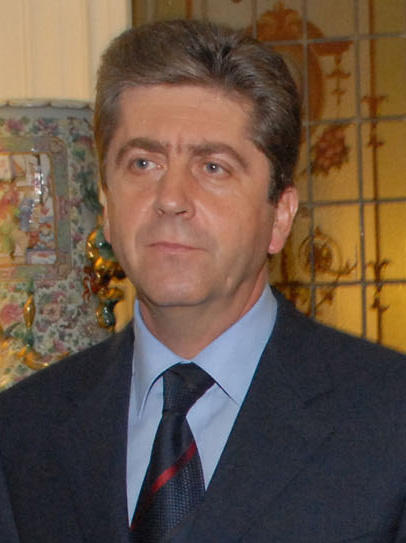
Nominee	Georgi Parvanov	Volen Siderov
Party	BSP	Ataka
Running mate	Angel Marin	Pavel Shopov
Popular vote	2,050,488	649,387
Percentage	75.95%	24.05%
President before election
Georgi Parvanov
BSP
Elected President
Georgi Parvanov
BSP

Presidential elections were held in Bulgaria on 22 October 2006, as decided on 27 July 2006 by the Bulgarian Parliament. The runoff took place on 29 October 2006, while the electoral campaign spanned 19 September – 20 October. At the election, Georgi Parvanov won his second and final term as President of Bulgaria.

Some of the right-wing parties were disunited at the time but still chose to support a common candidate, Nedelcho Beronov. Prime minister and head of the Socialist Party Sergey Stanishev expressed his strong support for the current president, Georgi Parvanov, in July 2006, and Parvanov officially stated his desire to run for a second term on 25 August 2006. He was also backed by the other two members of the then ruling Triple coalition – NDSV and DPS.

In the first round, incumbent Georgi Parvanov received 64% of the vote, ahead of nationalist leader Volen Siderov who came second with 21.5%. However, Parvanov was forced into a runoff with Siderov, as Bulgarian law requires a turnout of 50% for a president to be elected in the first round. Turnout for the first round was 44%. The defeated right-wing forces called for abstention, while some far-left formations expressed their support for Siderov.

The second round saw Parvanov win a decisive victory with 75.9% as opposed to Siderov's 24.1%, meaning that Parvanov became the first person to be democratically re-elected as President of Bulgaria. Second round turnout was 43%.

== Results ==
Candidate	Running mate	Party	First round		Second round	
Candidate	Running mate	Party	Votes	%	Votes	%
Georgi Parvanov	Angel Marin	Bulgarian Socialist Party	1,780,119	64.05	2,050,488	75.95
Volen Siderov	Pavel Shopov	Attack	597,175	21.49	649,387	24.05
Nedelcho Beronov	Yuliana Nikolova	Union of Democratic Forces	271,078	9.75		
Georgi Markov	Maria Ivanova	Order, Law and Justice	75,478	2.72		
Petar Beron	Stela Bankova	Independent	21,812	0.78		
Grigor Velev	Iordan Mutafchev	Аll in One Bulgaria	19,857	0.71		
Lyuben Petrov	Neli Topalova	Independent	13,854	0.50		
Total			2,779,373	100.00	2,699,875	100.00
Valid votes			2,779,373	97.29	2,699,875	97.91
Invalid/blank votes			77,374	2.71	57,560	2.09
Total votes			2,856,747	100.00	2,757,435	100.00
Registered voters/turnout			6,477,126	44.11	6,469,224	42.62
Source: Electoral Commission of Bulgaria

== See also ==
- President of Bulgaria
- Politics of Bulgaria
