= Georgi Ananiev =

Bulgarian politician (1950–2021)

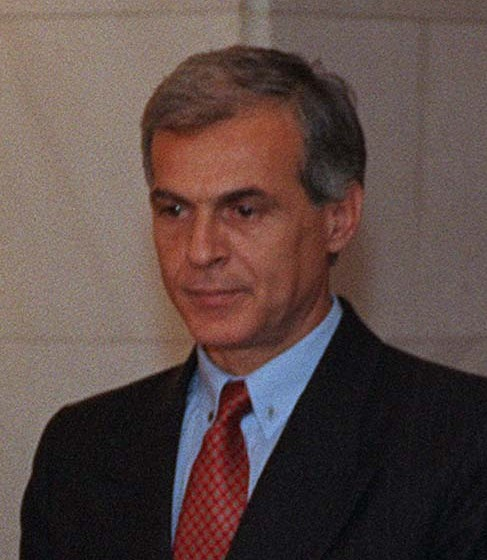

Personal details
- Born: 12 April 1950 Kosacha, Pernik Province, Bulgaria
- Died: 26 January 2021 (aged 70)
- Profession: Politician, engineer

Georgi Gervanov Ananiev (Bulgarian: Георги Герванов Ананиев; 12 April 1950 – 26 January 2021) was a Bulgarian politician who served as Minister of Defence in the Kostov government between 1997 and 1999.

== Life ==
Born in the village of Kosacha, near Radomir, Ananiev studied in a technical school of metallurgy and mechanotechnics in Pernik and graduated from the Mining and Geological Institute (Bulgarian: Минно-геоложки институт) in Sofia in 1974. He subsequently worked as an engineer for various companies. In the 1990s, he became a member of the UDF. In February 1997, Ananiev was appointed Minister of Defence in the caretaker government of Stefan Sofiyanski and retained his position following the formation of the Kostov cabinet. He is the first Bulgarian Minister of Defence to visit the Pentagon.

In 1999, he was replaced by Boyko Noev as a government minister, but was appointed secretary of defense (an occupation in the presidency which had not existed before) of then President Petar Stoyanov.

He died of COVID-19 during the COVID-19 pandemic in Bulgaria.

Political offices
| Preceded by Dimitar Pavlov | Minister of Defence of Bulgaria; 12 February 1997 – 21 December 1999 | Succeeded by Boyko Noev |
