= Nedelcho Beronov =

Bulgarian journalist and politician

- Неделчо Беронов
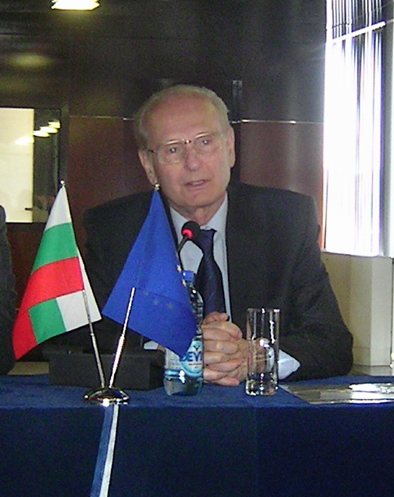
- Beronov in 2006

Personal details
- Born: July 22, 1928 Nova Zagora, Sliven Province, Bulgaria
- Died: July 4, 2015 (aged 86)
- Education: Sofia University
- Occupation: Jurist, politician

Nedelcho Krumov Beronov (Bulgarian: Неделчо Крумов Беронов) (22 July 1928 – 4 July 2015) was a Bulgarian jurist, right-wing politician and Constitutional Court chairman, as well as a presidential candidate in the 2006 presidential elections.

== Biography ==
Born in Nova Zagora, Beronov graduated from the Sofia University Faculty of Law in 1951 and from the University of National and World Economy in 1972. He worked as an arbiter and head arbiter at the Stara Zagora State Court of Arbitration between 1954 and 1991, as well as an arbiter at the Bulgarian Commercial and Industrial Chamber Court of Arbitration between 1977 and 1997.

Between 1993 and 1997 Beronov was a reader of Civil and Contractual Law at the Varna University of Economics and Varna Technical University. His work included a number of juridical publications.

A Union of Democratic Forces deputy and member of the Commission of Law-related Issues in the 38th National Assembly of Bulgaria in 1997, Beronov became a member of the Constitutional Court in the autumn of the same year and was unanimously elected as its chairman after the death of then-chairman Hristo Danov in October 2003.

His wife Anna is a professor at the Varna Medical University and his son Kamen is a mathematician, doctor of Kyoto University and a lecturer in Germany.

In 2006, Beronov was nominated as an independent candidate for President of Bulgaria supported by right-wing parties such as the Union of Democratic Forces, Democrats for a Strong Bulgaria and the Democratic Party, together with vice president candidate Yuliana Nikolova. Beronov came third in the first round with 9.75% of the votes and failed to reach the runoff.
