= Kosacha =

Kosacha Косача
- Village
- Location of Kosacha
- Coordinates: 42°34′00″N 22°51′00″E
- Country: Bulgaria
- Province (Oblast): Pernik
- Municipality (Obshtina): Kovachevtsi
- First mentioned: 1573

Area
  - Land: 13,344 km^{2} (5,152 sq mi)
- Elevation: 822 m (2,697 ft)

Population (2020)
  - Total: 148
- Time zone: UTC+2 (EET)
  - Summer (DST): UTC+3 (EEST)
- Postal Code: 2448
- License plate: PK

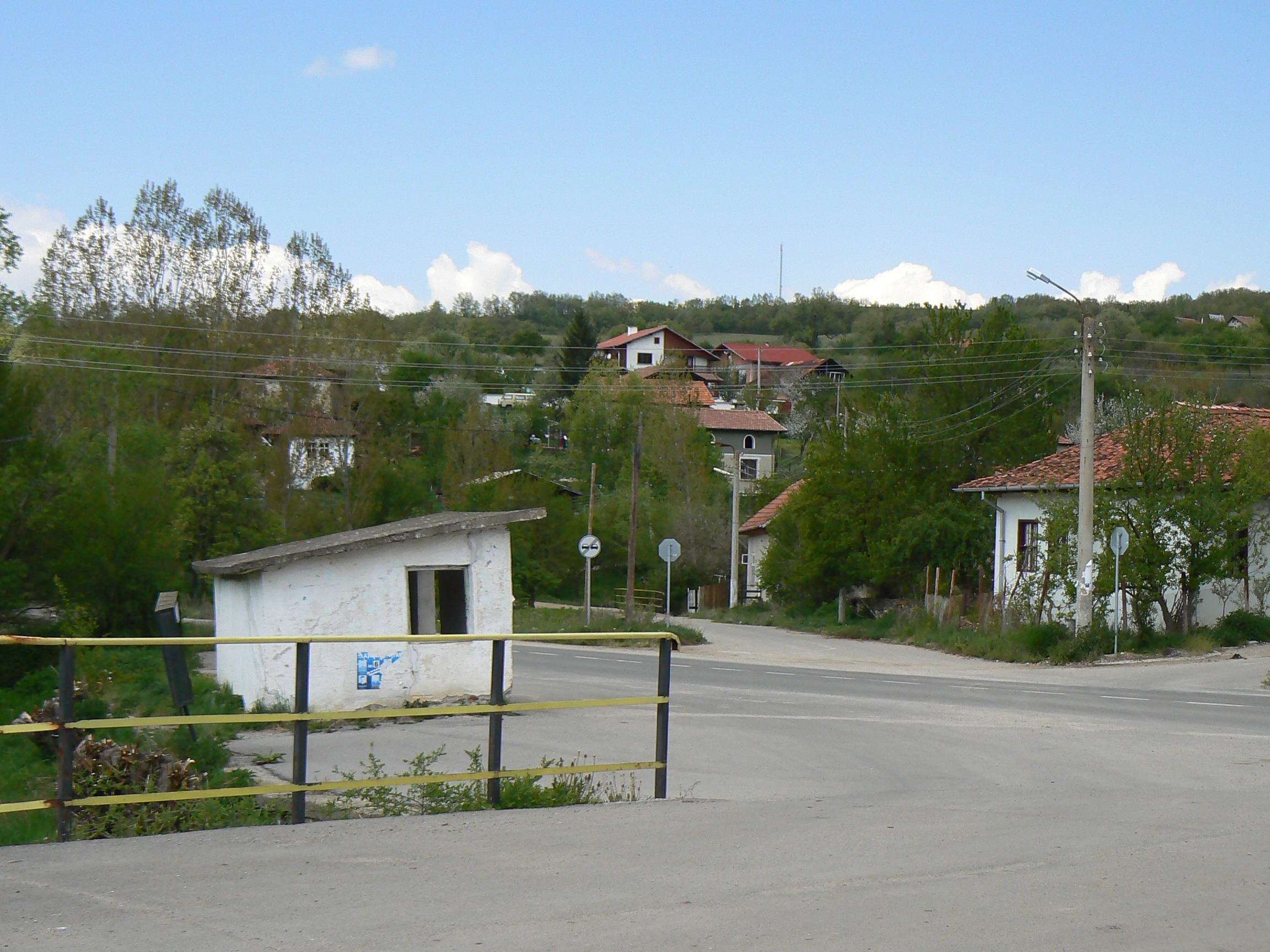
Kosacha village center

Kosacha (Bulgarian: Косача, also transliterated Kosača) is a village in western Bulgaria. Its located in Oblast Pernik, Obshtina Kovachevci.

== Geography ==
The village of Kosacha is located in a mountainous region, 16 km southwest of Pernik and 41 km southwest of Sofia.

The village is a conglomeration of neighborhoods scattered over hills and valleys. The neighborhoods are Tyutyundzhiyska, Polyana, Domishlyarska - there is the house of Georgi Parvanov's mother, Evreyska (Jewish), Velichkova - there is his father's house, Eleninska / grandmother Elena hid Levski in the church, wife of grandfather Pene - a merchant in Constantinople. Picked up by a priest from the village of Ruzhdavitsa /, Bradarska mahala, Kyurkchiyska mahala / there are remains of a fortress /, Gruyova mahala, Stoykovi, Todorovi, Kompirovi, Mialovi / Mihailovi /, Gypsy / by nickname /, Kovachevska mahala. The road distance from Tyutyundzhiya to Arbanashki rid is more than 6 km.

== History ==
The village was first mentioned in the Ottoman archives in 1573.

The ancient town of Buieridava was located near the village and the Lobosh dam (Pchelina). It was founded approx. 5th century BC from the Thracian tribe Ilei.

== Name ==
The name derives from the Bulgarian word Kosach, which means Mower.

== Landmarks ==
There is an alphabet (Cyrillic) containing a list notable Kosachi (Mowers)

== Notable people ==
- Georgi Ananiev (1950 - 2021), former Minister of Defense
- Pavle (Pavel) Mladenov, Bulgarian revolutionary from IMRO
- Petǎr Milev (1879 - 1908), Bulgarian revolutionary
- Georgi Konstantinov, Bulgarian revolutionary from IMRO
- Georgi Solunski (1939 - ), Bulgarian actor, macedonist
- Marko Lazarov (1867 - 1915), Bulgarian revolutionary from IMRO
- Stanimir Aleksov, Macedonian-Adrianopolitan volunteer
- Georgi Parvanov (1957 - ), former Bulgarian president
