= Georgi Parvanov =

President of Bulgaria from 2002 to 2012

- Георги Първанов
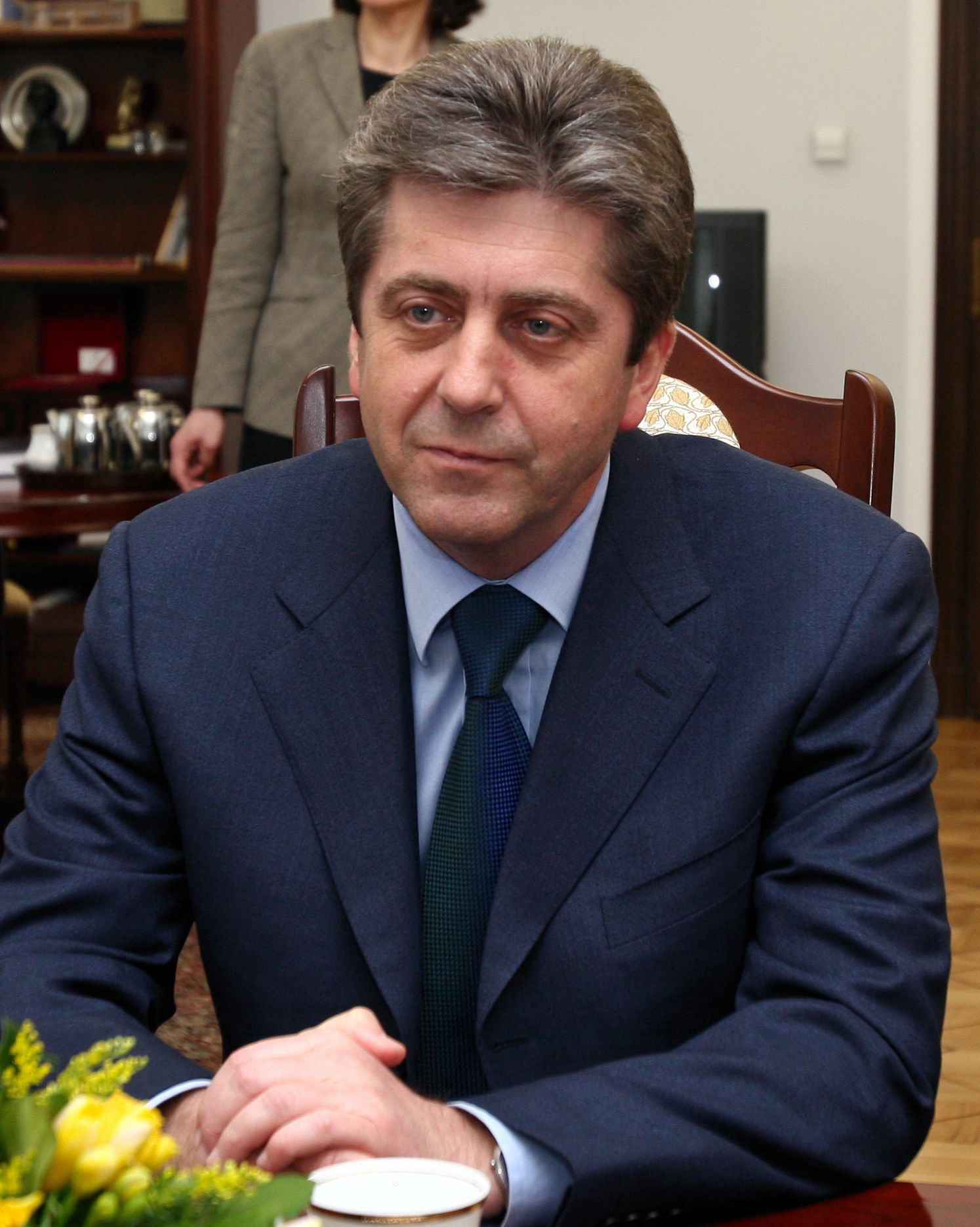
- Parvanov in 2008

President of Bulgaria
- In office 22 January 2002 – 22 January 2012
- Prime Minister: Simeon Sakskoburggotski; Sergey Stanishev; Boyko Borisov
- Vice President: Angel Marin
- Preceded by: Petar Stoyanov
- Succeeded by: Rosen Plevneliev

Leader of the Bulgarian Socialist Party
- In office 21 December 1996 – 5 December 2001
- Preceded by: Zhan Videnov
- Succeeded by: Sergey Stanishev

Member of the National Assembly
- In office 12 January 1995 – 29 November 2001
- Constituency: 2nd MMC - Burgas

Personal details
- Born: 28 June 1957 (age 69) Sirishtnik, Bulgaria
- Party: Alternative for Bulgarian Revival (2014–present)
- Other political affiliations: Communist Party (1981–1990); Socialist Party (1990–2002; 2012–2014); Independent (2002–2012)
- Spouse: Zorka Parvanova (m. 1983)
- Children: Vladimir, Ivaylo
- Education: Sofia University
- Awards: Order of the Southern Cross
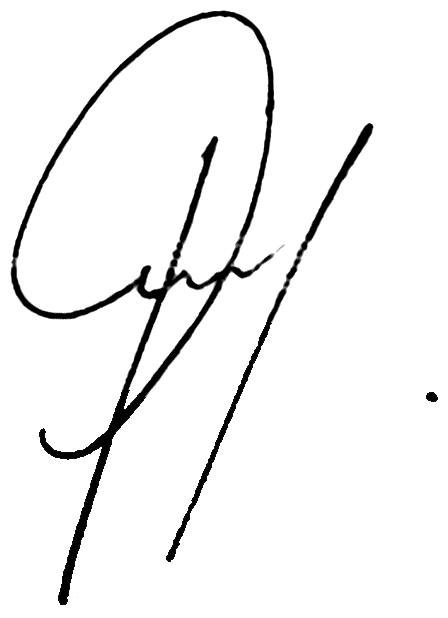
- Signature

Georgi Sedefchov Parvanov (Bulgarian: Георги Седефчов Първанов, IPA: [ˈɡjɔrɡi pɐrˈvanof]) (born 28 June 1957) is a Bulgarian historian and politician who was the president of Bulgaria from 2002 to 2012. He was elected after defeating incumbent Petar Stoyanov in the second round of the November 2001 presidential election. He took office on January 22, 2002. He was reelected in 2006 with 75.9% of the vote, becoming the first Bulgarian president to serve two terms. Parvanov supported and promoted Bulgaria's accession to NATO (2004) and the EU (2007).

Although not explicitly required by the Constitution, Bulgarian presidents traditionally suspend party membership while in office. Parvanov left the Bulgarian Socialist Party (BSP) after his election in 2001. Although he identified as a socialist, Parvanov often called himself a 'social president'.

After completing his second term as president, Parvanov returned to the Socialist Party, prompting a dispute over the party leadership. In January 2014, Parvanov revived the ABV project—which later became a political party—announcing he would be fielding his own candidates for the 2014 European parliamentary elections. On 15 January 2017, he stepped down as party leader and was replaced by Konstantin Prodanov.

== Biography ==
=== Early years ===
Georgi Parvanov was born in Sirishtnik, Pernik Province on June 28, 1957. He grew up in nearby Kosacha. In 1975, Parvanov graduated from secondary school in Pernik and, in 1981, finished his undergraduate education at Sofia University, gaining a major in history, and specializing in the history of the Bulgarian Communist Party. In 1988, Parvanov defended his doctoral thesis in history, which is titled "Dimitar Blagoev and the Bulgarian national question 1879-1917".

=== Professional career ===
Parvanov joined the Institute for History of the Bulgarian Communist Party as a researcher in 1981. His main interest was the Bulgarian national issue and the early history of social democracy in Bulgaria. In 1989, he was promoted to a senior research associate.

In May 2001, he became a member of the Internet Society of Bulgaria.

== Political career ==
=== Early political career ===
In 1981, Parvanov joined the Bulgarian Communist Party. In April 1990, the party was transformed into the Bulgarian Socialist Party. In 1989, Parvanov formed the nationalist organization Nationwide Committee for the Defense of National Interests (Bulgarian: Общонароден комитет за защита на националните интереси). In 1994, he became Deputy Chairman of the BSP national Council. It was also in that year that he was elected to the National Assembly—where he was reelected in 1997 and 2001. Parvanov was chairman of the Parliamentary Group for Friendship with Greece and member of the Parliamentary Committee on Radio and Television from 1994 to 1997.

=== Leader of the Bulgarian Socialist Party ===
Because of a severe financial crisis, the Prime Minister and leader of the BSP, Zhan Videnov, resigned in December 1996. Georgi Parvanov was elected as his successor that month. (Note: Since the Bulgarian Socialist Party was the leader of the coalition "Democratic Left", and then the "Coalition for Bulgaria", Parvanov became its chairman as well.) However, after large protests against the socialist government in January 1997, Parvanov and Nikolay Dobrev (the nominated Prime Minister) returned the mandate to form a government. In the early parliamentary elections that ensued, the Socialist Party went into opposition, swept away by the Union of Democratic Forces (SDS).

In 2000 Parvanov was reelected as Chairman of the National Council of the BSP. He has been credited with altering the geopolitical orientation of the party, paving the way for Bulgaria's joining of NATO in 2004.

Parvanov led his party to its worst electoral performance in 2001. Both the BSP and the SDS suffered greatly from the rise of the newly founded National Movement for Simeon II.

=== 2001 presidential election ===
In the first round of the 2001 presidential election, Parvanov won 36.4% of the votes, finishing ahead of the incumbent SDS candidate, Petar Stoyanov, who polled 34.9% of the votes. The voter turnout was the lowest to date: only 41.8%. Parvanov emerged victorious in the runoff, winning 54.1% of the votes. Voter turnout was significantly higher in the second round: 55.1%. Following his victory, Sergei Stanishev took over the party leadership. Parvanov took office on 22 January 2002, becoming the first ex-Communist to win the presidency since 1990.

=== 2006 presidential election ===
In 2006, he ran for re-election. He was backed by the ruling triple coalition, who won 70% of the seats in parliament the year before. He won first round on 22 October with 64 per cent of the vote. Because the turnout was less than 50%, he faced the nationalist Volen Siderov at the runoff on 29 October. Parvanov won with 76 per cent of the vote. This made Parvanov the first President to be reelected in Bulgaria.

=== Second mandate ===
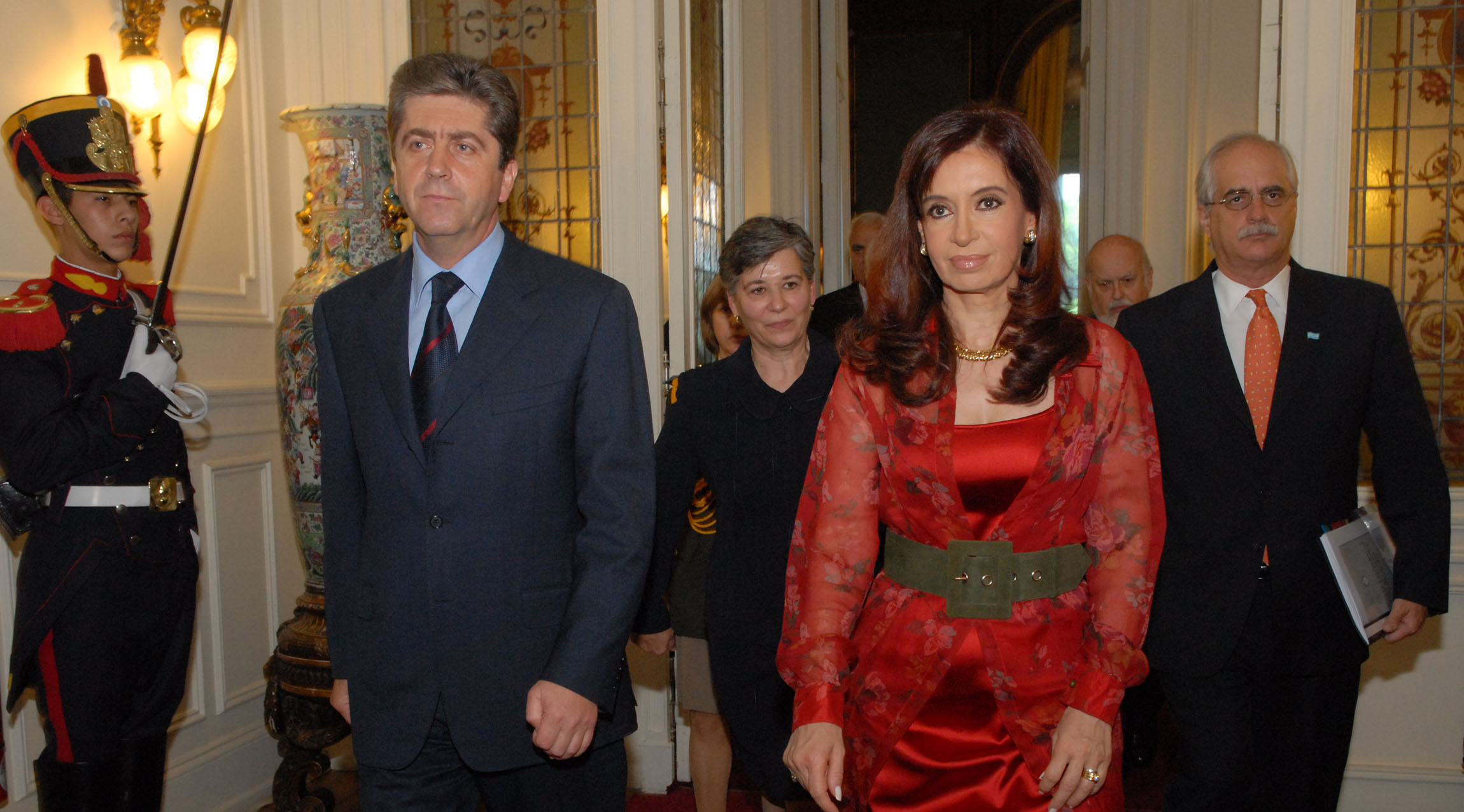
Parvanov meeting with President of Argentina Cristina Fernández de Kirchner, on 11 November 2008

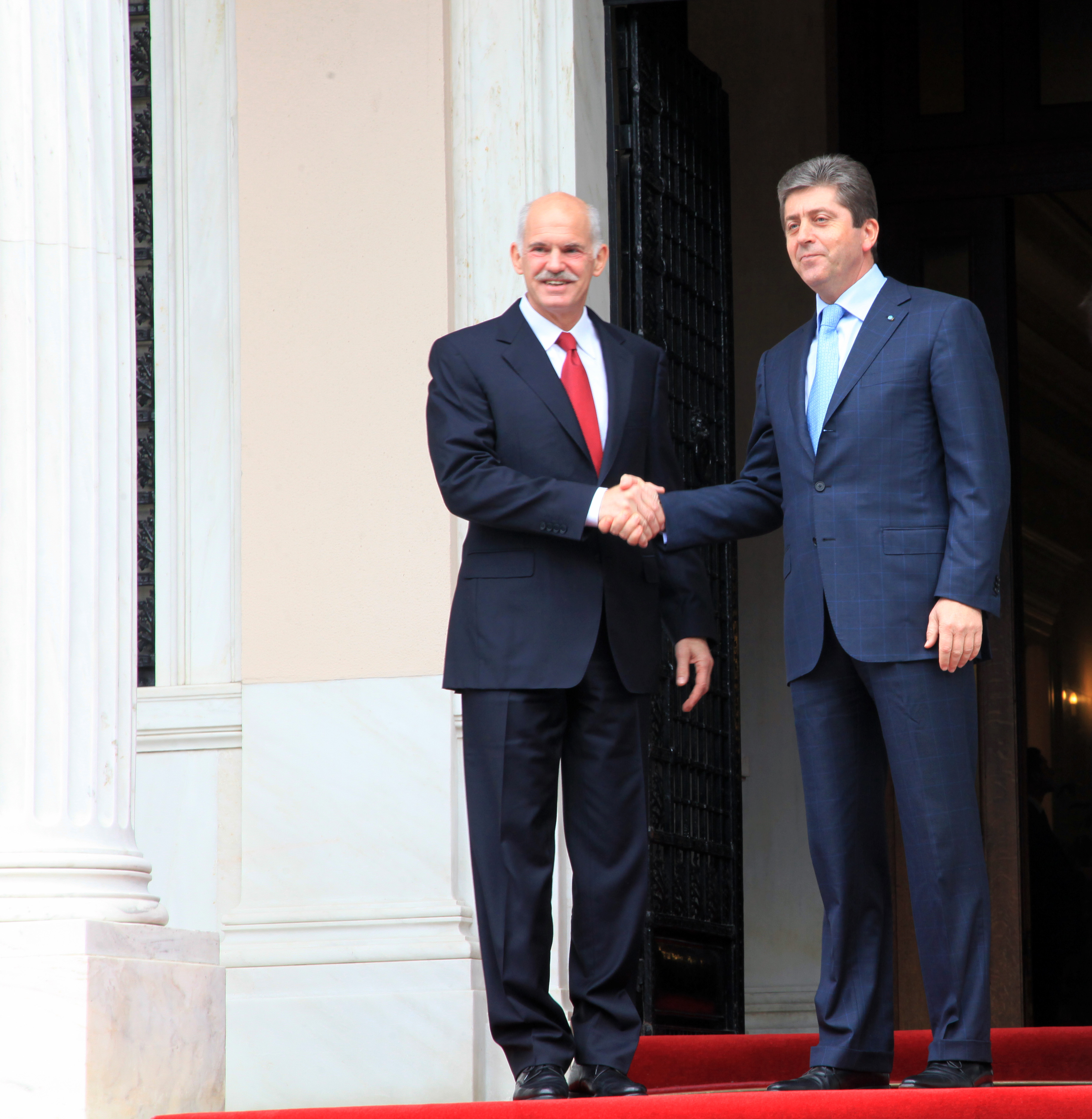
Parvanov with Greek Prime Minister George Papandreou, on 25 November 2009

In the second mandate of Georgi Parvanov as a President of Bulgaria, two governments changed: that of Sergei Stanishev and the current one of Boiko Borisov. As for the government of Stanishev Parvanov is often accused of not taking position about important matters, the critics even made Parvanov admit he actually proposed resignation of Stanishev as a PM before the end of Stanishev government's mandate in order that the Socialist Party has more chances in the following parliamentary elections. At the beginning of the First Borisov Government, Parvanov faced regular argues with Finance Minister Simeon Djankov and later with Minister of Defence Aniu Anev, and indirectly with Minister of Education Sergei Ignatov. Arguments and tapes send to media reached such point that a proposal for impeachment reached in Bulgarian Parliament which had enough signed representers but in the last moment was not voted by the RZS party and thus failed parliamentary approval. Following the attempt for impeachment Parvanov quickly gained back his personal authority.

==== ABV (АБВ) ====
In summer 2010, Parvanov launched his platform ABV (Bulgarian: АБВ), the name constructed from the first three letters of the Bulgarian alphabet, which he claimed was neither a political party nor a preparation for registering one. However, he visited many cities and had meetings with mayors, which some interpreted as a preparation for regional and further parliamentary elections. With the coming-out of the first sociological research, it became clear ABV would not reach enough votes in the next elections and Parvanov moved his sights back to his party BSP. It was also suggested that ABV would move as a part of BSP at some point. While in 2013 virtually no media mentioned ABV in any context, in January 2014 Parvanov made what some media called "a disappointing attempt to restart the project", and others referred to ABV as an "officially frozen project".

=== Political stances ===
Although the office of the Bulgarian President is largely representative as executive power lies within the government, Parvanov was known for playing an active role in his tenure as President. His political views, for example in the context of the Kosovo War, have been described as pro-Russian.

== Criticisms ==
=== Collaboration with Committee for State Security ===
In 2006 Parvanov admitted that before 1989 there was a file on him at the Communist Security Service (Darzhavna Sigurnost, or DS) under the nickname "Gotse" (for the revolutionary Gotse Delchev) for his scientific assistance on Macedonian topics. The file like most other files of the Security Service hasn't been released to the public for a while (it is now available online). According to Parvanov's own statement, the file only shows that he had been consulted as a historian in conjunction with the writing of a memoir book about events related to the Macedonian Question in the 19th century. That was confirmed by two members of parliamentary commissions that had examined the files of the Security Service earlier — Bogomil Bonev and Veselin Angelov. Two other members, Metodi Andreev and Evgeni Dimitrov, accused the former of lying and asserted that the historical research had only been a prelude, followed by Parvanov's consent to work as an agent and write a report about his institute.

=== Iraq Oil for Food program (1998) ===
The report of the Special Commission of the United Nations into the misconduct of the Iraqi "Oil for food" suggests that in 1998 Saddam Hussein took bribes from the Bulgarian Socialist Party, then led by Parvanov and companies close to the party. Parvanov denied these allegations explaining that the party's financing was transparent and legitimate. No further evidence to support these claims was found.

== Other ==
=== Bulgarian Christmas Charity Campaign (2003–present) ===
Georgi Parvanov initiated the "Bulgarian Christmas" campaign, a funds raised for the treatment of children and renovation of hospitals and health institutions. Bulgarian Christmas is a musical event each year at the time of Christmas in which Bulgarian performers sing their most popular songs in the audience of the President and his wife, and other VIP guests. The event is TV-broadcast on the national channel BNT and funds are being raised by donations through SMS and bank transfers.

Over the years, millions of euro have been donated by private individuals such as Igor Parvanov and foreign companies, and Parvanov as closely related to the campaign warrants that the money be spent as prescribed.

== Family ==
Parvanov has two children with his wife, Zorka Parvanova: Vladimir and Ivaylo. Parvanov has two grandchildren from his son Vladimir: Georgi (born 2011) and Victoria (born 2015).

== Honours ==
=== Foreign honours ===
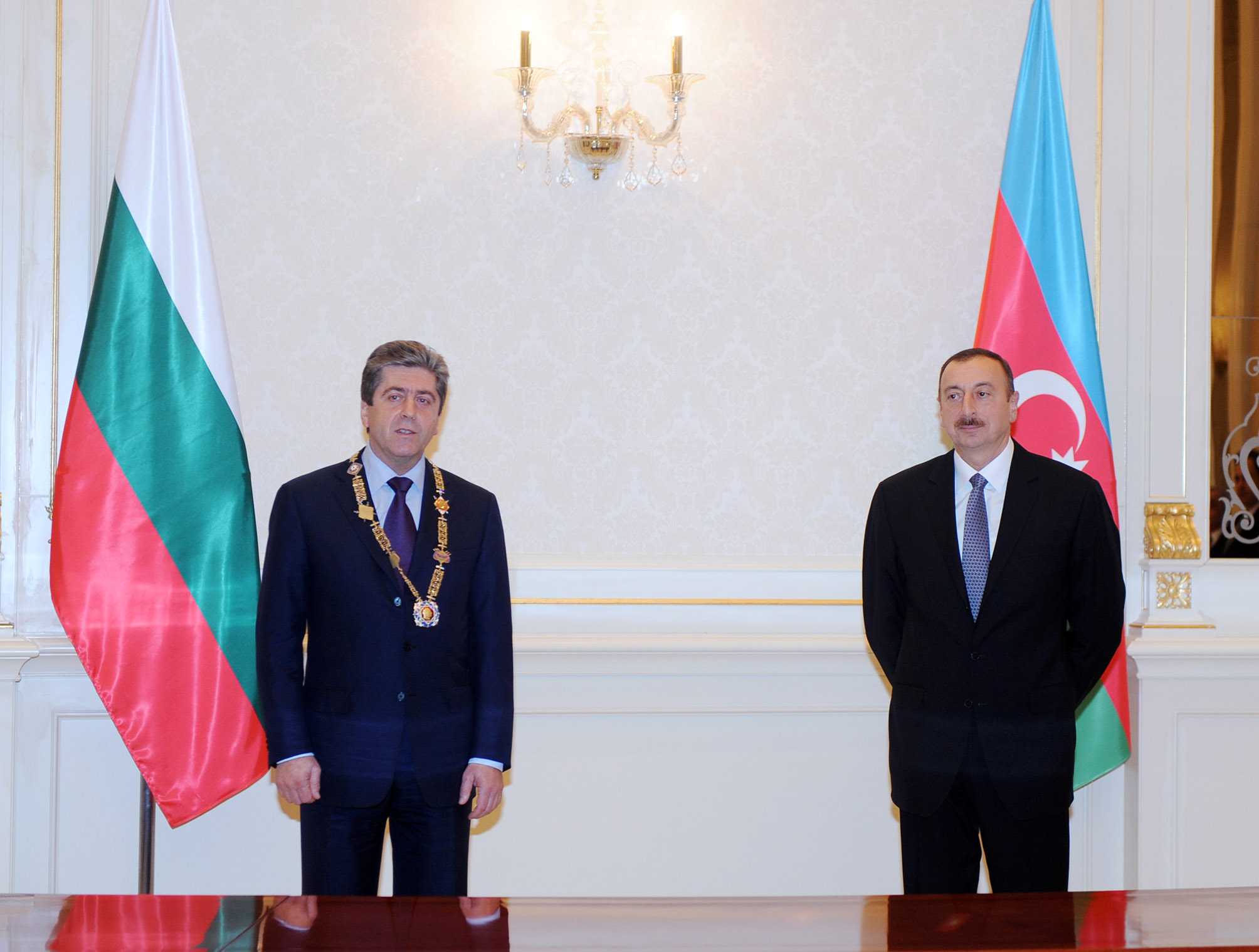
Parvanov with the Heydar Aliyev Order.

- Azerbaijan: Heydar Aliyev Order
- Belgium: Grand Cordon of the Leopold
- Brazil: Knight Grand Cross of the Order of the Southern Cross
- Denmark: Knight of the Order of the Elephant (29 March 2006)
- Estonia: Collar of the Order of the Cross of Terra Mariana (30 May 2003)
- Latvia: 1st Class with Chain of the Order of the Three Stars
- Lithuania: Knight Grand Cross with Golden Chain of the Order of Vytautas the Great (13 March 2009)
- Malta: Companion of Honour with Collar of the National Order of Merit (20 October 2009)
- Monaco: Knight Grand Cross of the Order of Saint-Charles (26 November 2004)
- Norway: Knight Grand Cross of the Order of St. Olav (29 August 2006)
- Spain: Collar of the Order of Civil Merit (7 June 2003)
- Portugal: Grand Collar of the Order of Prince Henry (7 October 2002)

== Bibliography ==
Lilov, Grigor (2013). Най-богатите българи (1st ed.). Sofia: "Кайлас" ЕООД. ISBN 978-954-92098-9-1.
Prodanov, Vasil; Todorov, Antoniy; Avramov, Yosif; Ivanova, Vanya (2009). Българският парламент и преходът (1st ed.). Sofia: Ciela. ISBN 978-954-28-0352-2.

== Publications ==
Parvanov is an author of dozens of scientific articles. His monographs and books:

- Dimitar Blagoev and the Bulgarian National Problem 1879–1917, 1988
- From Bouzloudja to the Corona Theatre. An Attempt at a New Reading of Pages from the BSP's Social Democratic Period, 1995
- The Bulgarian Social Democracy and the Macedonian Issue at the End of the 19th century up to 1918, 1997
- Before and after the 10th, 2001

Political offices
Preceded by Petar Stoyanov	President of Bulgaria; 2002–2012	Succeeded by Rosen Plevneliev
