= Nikolay Vasilev (sailor) =

Bulgarian sailor

Personal information
- Nationality: Bulgarian
- Born: 10 January 1955 (age 70)

Sport
- Sport: Sailing

Nikolay Vasilev (Bulgarian: Николай Василев; born 10 January 1955) is a Bulgarian sailor. He competed in the Finn event at the 1980 Summer Olympics.
