= Sergey Stanishev =

Bulgarian politician (born 1966)

- Сергей Станишев
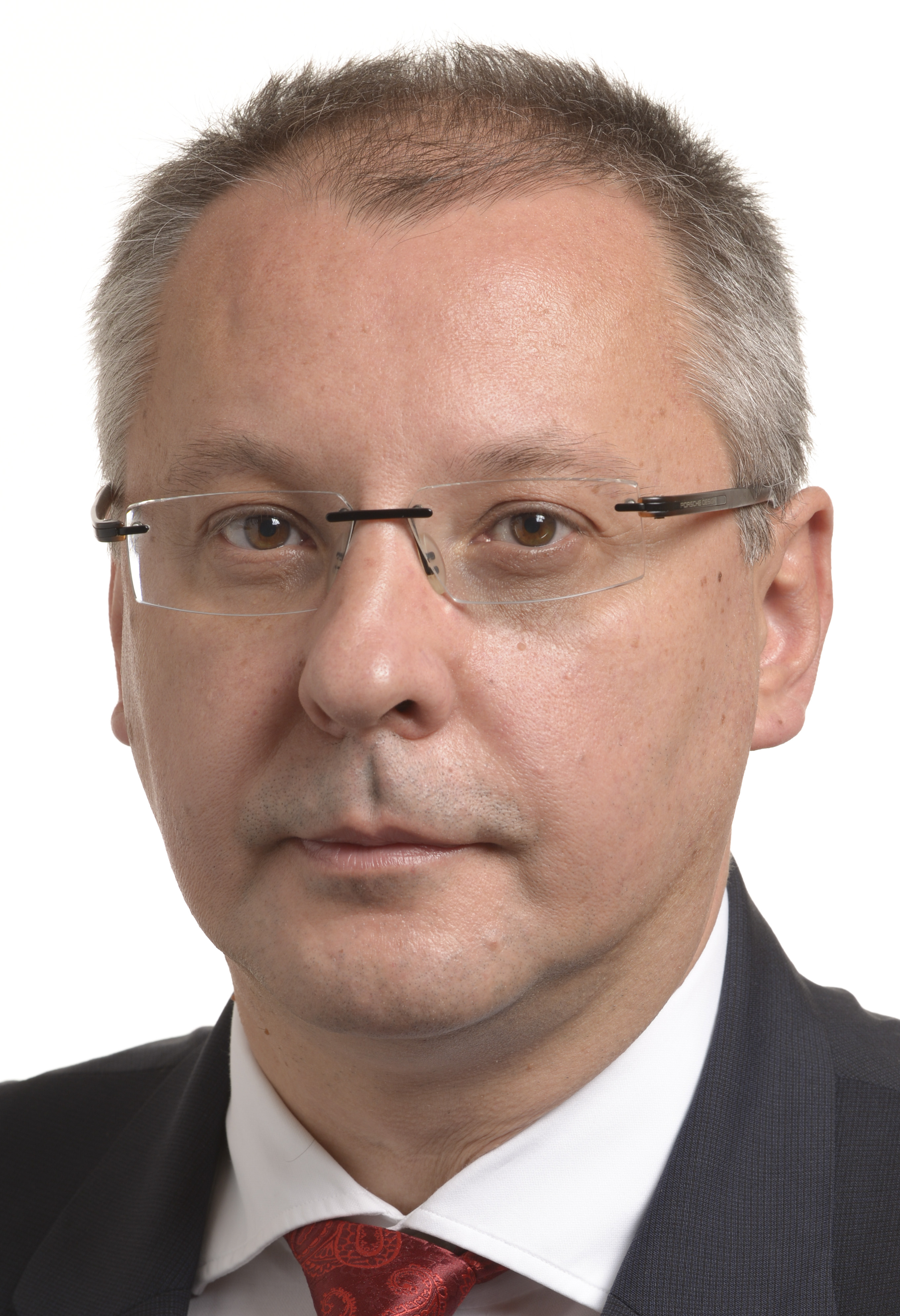
- Official portrait, 2014

Prime Minister of Bulgaria
- In office 16 August 2005 – 27 July 2009
- President: Georgi Parvanov
- Deputy: Ivailo Kalfin; Emel Etem Toshkova; Meglena Plugchieva; Daniel Valchev
- Preceded by: Simeon Sakskoburggotski
- Succeeded by: Boyko Borisov

Member of the European Parliament for Bulgaria
- In office 1 July 2014 – 15 July 2024
- Preceded by: Ivaylo Kalfin
- Succeeded by: Kristian Vigenin

President of the European Socialists
- In office 24 November 2011 – 14 October 2022
- Preceded by: Poul Nyrup Rasmussen
- Succeeded by: Stefan Löfven

Leader of the Bulgarian Socialist Party
- In office 5 December 2001 – 27 July 2014
- Preceded by: Georgi Parvanov
- Succeeded by: Mihail Mikov

Member of the National Assembly
- In office 14 July 2009 – 25 June 2014
- Constituency: 3rd MMC – Varna
- In office 19 April 1997 – 16 August 2005
- Constituency: 19th MMC – Ruse

Personal details
- Born: Sergey Dimitrievich Stanishev; 5 May 1966 (age 60) Kherson, Ukrainian SSR, Soviet Union (now Ukraine)
- Citizenship: Bulgarian; Russian (until 1996)
- Party: BSP (since 1990)
- Other political affiliations: Party of European Socialists
- Spouse: Monika Yosifova (m. 2013)
- Children: Two
- Education: Moscow State University (BA, MA, PhD)
- Occupation: Politician; journalist

Sergey Dmitrievich Stanishev (Note: Bulgarian: Сергей Дмитриевич Станишев, pronounced [sɛrˈɡɛj 'dmitriɛvit͡ʃ stɐˈniʃɛf]) (born 5 May 1966) is a Bulgarian politician who served Prime Minister of Bulgaria from 2005 to 2009. A member of the Socialist Party, which he led from 2001 to 2014, he later served as Member of the European Parliament from 2014 to 2024. Stanishev was also the President of the European Socialists from 2011 to 2022 and a Member of the National Assembly from 1997 to 2005 and from 2009 to 2014.

== Early life, education and career ==
Stanishev was born in 1966, in Kherson, Ukrainian SSR (Soviet Union), to Dinah Sergeevna Muhina, a Soviet citizen and Dimitar Stanishev, a Bulgarian Communist official who headed the Bulgarian Communist Party's foreign policy department and would later become secretary of the party central committee.

After beginning his schooling in Soviet Russia, he then graduated from the 35 SOU "Dobri Voynikov" in Sofia. Stanishev subsequently graduated from Moscow State University in 1989 and obtained his candidate degree (PhD-equivalent) in 1994 both in the field of history. His thesis was entitled "The system of service promotion of high ranking officials in Russia and its evolution during the second half of XIX century". In 1998, he specialized in political sciences at Moscow School of political studies. He was a visiting fellow in international relations at the London School of Economics and Political Science in 1999–2000. He also worked as a freelance journalist.

In 1995, he became a staff member in the Foreign Affairs Department of the Bulgarian Socialist Party (BSP). He was Chief of Foreign Policy and International Relations for the BSP from 1996 to 2001. In May 2000 he was elected a Member of the BSP Supreme Council and Member of the Executive Bureau. In June 2001, he entered politics when he was elected as a member of the Bulgarian National Assembly from the region of Ruse.

== Political career ==
=== Chairmanship of the Bulgarian Socialist Party ===
In December 2001, Stanishev was elected Chairman of the BSP at the party's Congress, and also Chairman of the Parliamentary Group of the Coalition for Bulgaria following the resignation of the previous holder of these positions, Georgi Parvanov, after his victory in the 2001 presidential election. Since April 2004 Stanishev has also been a member of the presidency of the Party of European Socialists (PES). Even though at the beginning older party members regarded him with suspicion due to his lack of experience, Stanishev has enjoyed considerable public approval, mainly because of his successful efforts to modernise the BSP. Stanishev succeed to modernise the BSP, leading it to fill membership to the Socialist International and then to be member of the PES. He was elected as a member of the European Parliament for a second term in 2019.

=== Prime minister ===
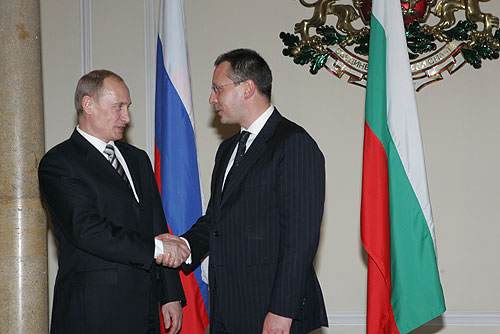
Stanishev and Russian President Vladimir Putin on 18 January 2008

In the general election of 25 June 2005 Stanishev was re-elected to the National Assembly, this time for a seat in Burgas. Under his leadership the Coalition for Bulgaria (a coalition dominated by the BSP) won 31% of the votes. Stanishev said that the next government "should be led by the party which won most votes in the elections." On 20 July, after nearly a month of political uncertainty, Stanishev agreed to attempt to form a Cabinet. On 27 July 2005 the Bulgarian Parliament chose him as the new Prime Minister in a coalition government, led by the BSP and National Movement Simeon II in a partnership with the Movement for Rights and Freedoms. The vote was 120 to 119. However, the parliament voted against Stanishev's proposed Cabinet by 119 to 117 votes.

This was followed by another two weeks of political deadlock. Finally, on 15 August, Stanishev was able to form a three-party grand coalition with the party of outgoing Prime Minister Simeon Sakskoburggotski and with the Movement for Rights and Freedoms, a Turkish minority party. Stanishev said the coalition's priorities would be "European integration, social responsibility and economic growth." He was elected Prime Minister by the Bulgarian parliament on 16 August with 168 in favour and 67 against, which is then sworn in.

Sergey Stanishev is an avid pro-EU politician who is credited with reforming Bulgaria to the extent that he managed to steer his country to be among the last group of countries which joined the EU. Stanishev said Bulgaria's entrance to the EU was the final fall of the Berlin Wall for his nation, while EU President Jose Manuel Barroso hailed Bulgaria for having "gone through a remarkable transformation" in order to join.

The European Commission's report on Bulgaria and Romania's accession had confirmed that after seven years of talks, Bulgaria and Romania were able to take on the rights and obligations of EU membership. Reading the report, Barroso said the two nations' entry would be a "historic achievement".

In June 2008 Stanishev drew criticism from human rights advocates for his remarks regarding Bulgaria's first gay pride parade; the Prime Minister said he did not approve of "the manifestation and demonstration of such orientations."

Also in June 2008 The Guardian published an article highly critical of planned real estate development in a pristine seacoast area under EU environmental protection. Sergey Stanishev's brother, Georgi Stanishev, is the Bulgarian partner of Foster and Partners, the developer behind the controversial project.

In March 2009, New Europe published the heading 'Barroso backs Stanishev'. Stanishev received the full support of European Commissions President Jose Manuel Barroso concerning the improvement of the cooperation with the European Commission and the enhancement of the administrative capacity. Prime Minister Stanishev was on a working visit to Brussels and met with President Barroso, as well as European Commissioner for Energy Andris Piebalgs and Commissioner for Economic and Monetary Affairs Joaquin Almunia.

Later in June 2009, Sergey Stanishev supported Jose Manuel Barroso for a second term as EU Commission President.

=== President of the Party of European Socialists (PES) ===
Stanishev took over the PES leadership as Interim President in late 2011 after his predecessor, Poul Nyrup Rasmussen, stepped down from his post. In September 2012, at the 9th PES Congress, Sergey Stanishev was elected (with 91.3% of the votes) as President of PES for a full two-year term. He was the only candidate for the post.

On 11 June 2015, he was re-elected after his rival, Enrique Barón Crespo, withdrew from the race. According to him, his victory margin was 69.5% to 16.5%, with 13.3% abstaining. At the PES congress in Lisbon in 2018 Stanishev was re-elected as president of the PES.

=== Later career ===
At the 2014 European parliament election, Stanishev was elected as Member of the European Parliament for Bulgaria, placing second on the BSP party list.

In early July 2014, Stanishev announced that he would step down as leader of the BSP. On 27 July, at the BSP's 48th congress, incumbent chairperson of the National Assembly Mihail Mikov was elected to succeed Stanishev as party chair.

In the 2019 European Parliament election Stanishev earned a seat as a Member of the European Parliament for the 2019–2024 term. At the summit at which EU's top jobs were discussed Stanishev was proposed as a candidate for President of the European Parliament. However, he withdrew his nomination. Boyko Borisov, Prime Minister of Bulgaria, said Stanishev's nomination was an "honor and pride for Bulgaria". According to Euractiv, Stanishev is "at war" with the leader of the Bulgarian socialists Korneliya Ninova.

== Controversies ==
=== Hochegger scandal ===
In March 2012, Austrian lobbyist Peter Hochegger was found to have received nearly €1.5 M from the former three-way coalition government for a dubious campaign aimed at boosting Bulgaria's image abroad. A report indicated that a part of the sum paid to Hochegger's company had returned to the PR agency owned by Monika Yosifova, now Stanisheva, wife of Prime Minister Sergey Stanishev. Hochegger made headlines in Bulgaria after it emerged that he had lobbied for Bulgaria's EU accession in exchange for a fee of €1.5 M under two contracts from 2006 and 2008 signed during the term in office of the government headed by Stanishev. The Viennese Regional Criminal Court sentenced Hochegger to two and a half years in prison.

=== European elections project scandal ===
A public relations firm led by Stanishev's wife, Monika Stanisheva, won a €60,000 contract for a project to the European elections in Bulgaria. MEPs from the EPP have rung the alarm bell an "obvious" conflict of interest involving some of the most prominent figures in the European socialist family.

The project consists of a website explaining the functions of the European Parliament to a Bulgarian audience. According to experts, quoted by the Bulgarian press, the website is built on open source software and contains information copy-pasted from the EU institutions own websites. The contract will be investigated by the Budgets Committee of the European Parliament. Stanishev defended his wife saying that she was working on similar projects before they got married in 2013. He attacked his opponents by asking if they, "suggest that she should stop working?". Stanisheva has announced that she was returning the down payment of €29,679.93.

=== Criminal prosecution for lost documents ===
Sergey Stanishev faced a court on 18 of March 2014 in the so-called "lost documents" case, which many observers and Stanishev himself have claimed as based on pure political grounds. In a written statement, he stated that "In Bulgaria it is clear to everyone that the case against me is political."

He was charged with losing 7 classified documents - 3 from the State Agency for National Security (DANS), 2 from the Interior Ministry, 1 from the Defense Ministry and 1 from NATO - while he was Prime Minister. In October 2013 Stanishev voluntarily gave up his parliamentary immunity to be tried in court.

If convicted, he could have faced a two-year jail sentence or a fine.

On 16 December 2016, Stanishev was acquitted, with the judge stating that "there were no indisputable evidence that Stanishev lost the documents, nor was it proven conclusively that the documents contained confidential information".

== Personal life ==
In 2011, PR agent Monika Yosifova announced that she was having a baby with Stanishev. Their daughter Daria was born on 1 May 2011. Their second child Georgi was born in 2013. Yosifova is a divorcee who has two other children - Monika and Ventsislav - by her ex-husband Ventsislav Yosifov. Stanishev married Monika in May 2013.

Stanishev has one brother, architect Georgi Stanishev.

Stanishev acquired Bulgarian citizenship in 1996.

His hobbies include fitness, skiing, swimming and motorcycling.

== Bibliography ==
- Lilov, Grigor (2013). Най-богатите българи (1st ed.). Sofia: „Кайлас” ЕООД. ISBN 978-954-92098-9-1.

Party political offices
Preceded by Georgi Parvanov	Leader of the Socialist Party; 2001–2014	Succeeded by Mihail Mikov
Preceded by Poul Nyrup Rasmussen	President of the Party of European Socialists; 2011–present	Incumbent
Political offices
Preceded by Simeon Sakskoburggotski	Prime Minister of Bulgaria; 2005–2009	Succeeded by Boyko Borisov
