= Plamen Panayotov =

Bulgarian politician and academic (born 1958)

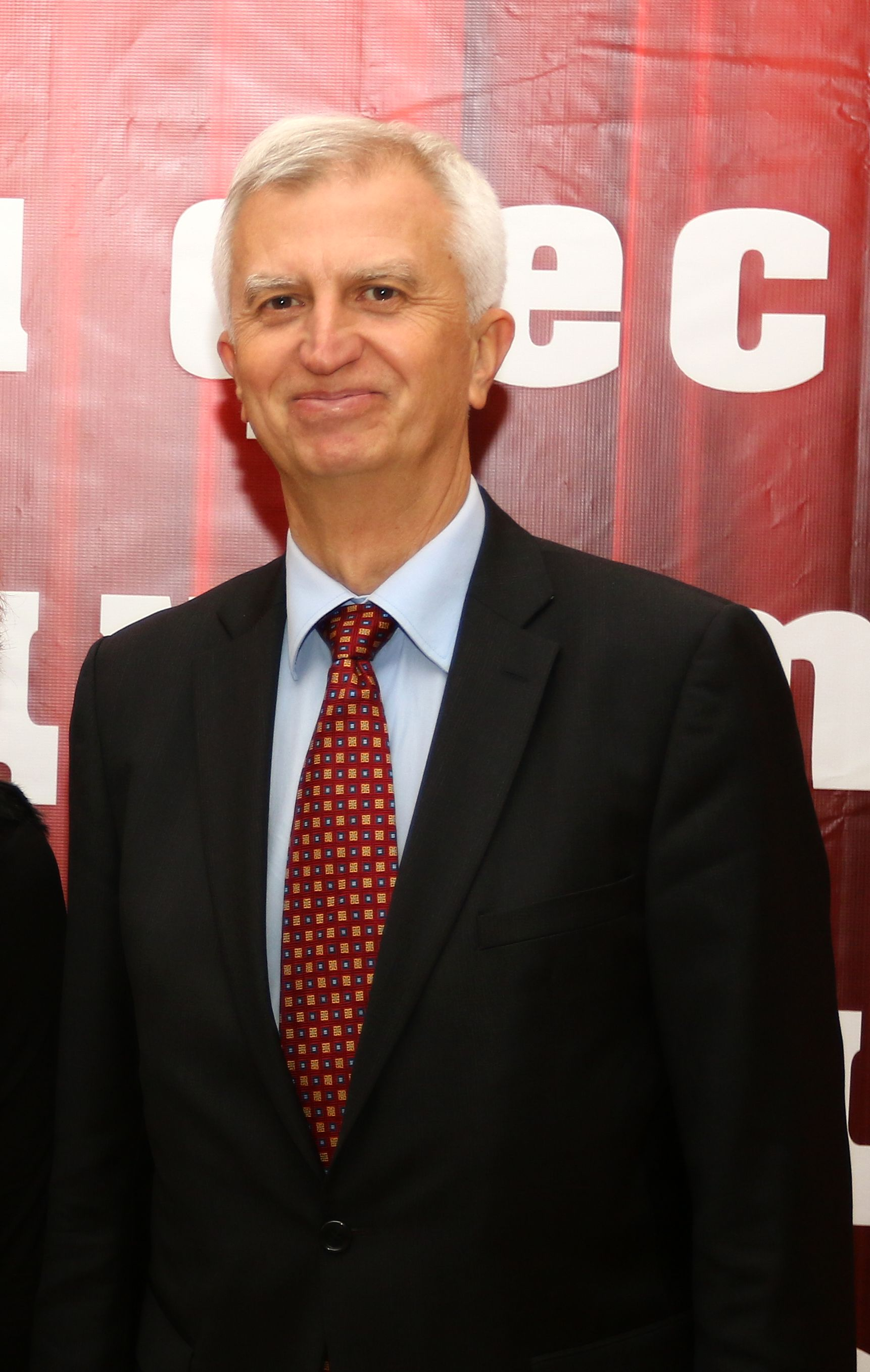
- Panayotov in 2016

Personal details
- Born: Kamen Panayotov; 20 January 1958 (age 68) Sliven, Bulgaria
- Profession: Politician, Academic

Plamen Aleksandrov Panayotov (Bulgarian: Пламен Александров Панайотов; born 20 January 1958) is a Bulgarian politician and academic who served as deputy Prime Minister in charge of European integration in the Sakskoburggotski cabinet between 2003 and 2005.

== Life ==
Born in Sliven, Panayotov graduated from the juridical faculty of Sofia University in 1983 with a degree in legal studies. He subsequently earned a doctorate and became a professor of criminal law in 2012.

In 2001, Panayotov was elected to the National Parliament and was chosen as the chairman of the parliamentary group of the NDSV, a position that he held until he assumed a government position on 17 July 2003. Panayotov left NDSV in 2007 and entered the ranks of Bulgarian New Democracy (Bulgarian: Българска нова демокрация).
