= Nikolay Vasilev =

Bulgarian politician and economist

Nikolay Vassilev
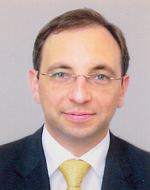

Personal details
- Born: 28 November 1969 (age 56) Varna, Bulgaria
- Profession: Politician, economist

Nikolay Vassilev Vassilev (Bulgarian: Николай Василев Василев) (born 28 November 1969) is a Bulgarian politician and economist, who has been part of two governments of Bulgaria. He is a former member of National Movement for Stability and Progress and served as Deputy Prime Minister and Minister of the Economy (2001–2003), Vice Prime Minister and Minister of Transport and Communications (2003–2005), and Minister of State Administration and Administrative Reform (2005–2009).

On 12 July 2021, Vassilev was nominated by the ITN party, which had secured the most votes in the July 2021 snap election, as their prospective Prime Minister. However, his candidacy was withdrawn on 15 July before an attempt to form a government was made.

Since 2009, Vassilev is managing partner at Expat Capital. With its licensed wholly owned subsidiary Expat Asset Management, it is the largest independent asset management company in Bulgaria. Expat manages hundreds of individual investment portfolios, several UCITS mutual funds with global focus, and a family of exchange-traded funds tracking the performance of the major local equity indices in Central and Eastern Europe. The ETFs are listed in Frankfurt on Xetra, with one fund also listed on the London Stock Exchange. Previously, Vassilev was senior vice president at Lazard Capital Markets in London (2000–2001), and associate director at UBS's Dillon, Read & Co. in the Tokyo, New York, and London offices (1996–2000), working in the area of equities and emerging markets. He was also a tax adviser at Coopers & Lybrand in Budapest (1993–1994).

Vassilev holds a Master of Arts degree in international economics and finance from Brandeis University (1997) with an exchange program at Keio University as well as two bachelor's degrees from the State University of New York at Oswego (1995) and the Budapest University of Economic Sciences (1994), and has been a Chartered Financial Analyst (CFA) charterholder since 1999. He speaks English, Hungarian and Russian, and has basic knowledge of French, German, and Japanese.

Vassilev is also chairman of the board of the Bulgarian CFA Association and the author of Energy (2009), Menu for Reformers (2014), and Career or Not (2018). He is married and has two daughters.
