= Lydia Shouleva =

Bulgarian politician

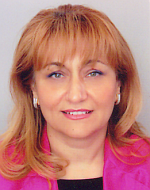
Lydia Shuleva

Lydia Shouleva (Bulgarian: Лидия Шулева; born 23 December 1956 in Velingrad) is a Bulgarian politician and Member of the European Parliament. She is a member of the National Movement Simeon II, part of the Alliance of Liberals and Democrats for Europe, and became an MEP on 1 January 2007 with the accession of Bulgaria to the European Union.
