= Big Sha =

Bulgarian rapper

- Birth name: Mihail Stanislavov Mihaylov
- Also known as: Misho Shamara
- Born: December 27, 1972 (age 52); Varna, Bulgaria
- Origin: Varna, Bulgaria
- Genres: Hip hop
- Occupations: Rapper; record producer; songwriter; entrepreneur
- Years active: 1994–present
- Labels: Frontline Hustle; R&B Records; Virginia

Mihail Stanislavov Mihaylov (Bulgarian: Михаил Станиславов Михайлов) born on December 27, 1972, better known as Big Sha or by his previous name, Misho The Slap (Bulgarian: Мишо Шамара), is a Bulgarian rapper from Varna, Bulgaria. He is known for his socialist leanings and disapproval of Bulgaria's prime minister Boiko Borisov. One of the country's top rap artists in the 1990s and the early 2000s, his career has been waning ever since his partner, Ivan Glavchev (Vanko 1), was sentenced in 2003 to 12 years in prison for running an organization that exported Bulgarian prostitutes, including minors, to France, Spain, Belgium and Italy. He openly supported Bulgaria's last socialist-led government, whose decision to appoint a media tycoon known for his links to organized crime as head of the national security agency sparked nationwide protests against the Oresharski cabinet. He also provoked indignation by calling Bulgaria's former Finance Minister, Simeon Dyankov, "Jewish scum" in 2013. The following day he published an apology to the Jewish community in Bulgaria, on his official Facebook page.

== Music career ==
Known as "the Hammer", after MC Hammer, he had a group called Hamburger 1 with which he caught some attention. But his success came with Gumeni Glavi (Rubber Heads) when their debut album sold over 120 000 copies in 1994 which is equal to a four times platinum certification from BAMP (Bulgarian Association of Music Producers). Their second album Second-Hand Tires didn't sell as well. After these two albums in 1997 Dj Dido D was introduced to the group and the albums that followed were instant classics in Bulgarian Hip Hop. The albums were called For More Money and For Even More Money. After their success, Gumeni Glavi performed over 200 concerts in Bulgaria but after disputes within the band they split up and Sha began his solo career.

== Solo career ==
He reached solo success with the smash hit single, "Fenki, Fenki" ("Fans, Fans") which became infamous for its lyrics. The following album, Moi ("Mine") sold 90 000 units. After this success in 2002 Shamara and Vanko 1 started their own record label R&B Records, through which they released Goliamata Kombina (The Big Duo) which sold over 200 000 copies. His protégés Konsa, 100 Kila, Benjamini and Loshite made numerous hits and so did Sha. In 2003 he released "Azbukata Na Jivota" ("The Alphabet Of Life") which was again on top of the Bulgarian Album Charts. In 2006 he released Obichai Blijnia, Bliji Obichania ("Love Those Close, And Lick Those Loved"), the album contained the hit tracks "Gnusnia Bradan" ("The Disgusting Beardman", a diss track against Spens), "Edin Den Se Napih" ("One Day I Got Drunk") featuring Konsa and Ogi Dog and "Boom Boom" featuring Mc Michael.

In 2007, Misho Shamara (literally Misho the Slap) changed his stage name to Big Sha, and founded a new label, Frontline Hustle, in association with Universal Music Bulgaria and Virginia Records. In 2008, he released Hliab I Amfeti ("Bread and Amphetamines") which featured collaborations with U.S. rappers Crucial Conflict and Drag-On, but also Serbian R'n'B singer LoOney. In 2009, he was featured on LiLana's song "Dime Piece" together with Snoop Dogg.

== Discography ==
=== Solo ===
- 2002: Мой (Mine)
- 2003: Азбуката на живота (The Life Alphabet)
- 2006: Обичай ближния и ближи обичания (Love Close Ones and Lick Loved Ones)
- 2008: Hliab I Amfeti (Bread and Amphetamines)

=== With Vanko 1 ===
- 2002: Голямата комбина (The Big Duo) with Vanko 1

=== Gumeni Glavi ===
- 1994: Квартал №41 (Neighborhood #41)
- 1995: Гуми втора употреба (Second-Hand Tires)
- 1996: Ремиксове '96 (Remixes '96)
- 1997: За повече пари (For More Money)
- 1998: За още повече пари (For Much More Money)
- 1998: Банда "Гумени Глави" (Rubber Heads Band)
- 1999: 2999
- 2001: The Best
- 2004: 10 години (10 Years)
