= Bulgarian hip-hop =

Music genre or scene

Bulgarian hip hop
- Stylistic origins: Hip hop
- Cultural origins: Mid 1980s, Bulgaria

Hip hop is one of the most popular music styles in Bulgaria, especially among young people.

== History ==
The Bulgarian hip hop culture development and influence is divided into two main periods.

"The First Wave" ran from the mid-1980s to mid-1990s. This period is known with its underground rap, breakdancing crews, graffiti artist and unknown DJs. At that time some of the active rappers like Ivo-Trombona, Vasko Teslata and Alexander recorded and created the first official Bulgarian rap band with the song "Problems" recorded in the studio of "New Generation" in Sofia. Ivo-Trombona (later on renamed as Mc Guinness) is considered the first Bulgarian Rapper and founder of the Bulgarian rap and hip hop culture. In 1991 an eclectic group of musicians, Dobo Rap Plamen Sound, recorded an experimental live rap album in the Black Sea city of Bourgas. Another follow ups at that time era were: Dynamic (DJ Stancho and Peter), Gumeni Glavi, Amnistea (some members participate in Dope Reach Squad), DEAD SIDE, Teslata and Bulldogz.

"The Second Wave" from 1999 to nowadays was a big time success in comparison to the first one, mainly due to the arrival of R'n'B and hip hop sensation, Henry Orhan Sami Beggin, otherwise known as Big Talk to his fans. Other prominent artists from this time are Misho Shamara (renamed as Big Sha) with his Frontline Hustle label, DJ Stancho, Spens and Slim and their label Sniper Records. Those two labels were quite controversial in terms of "real hip-hop", sampling and mostly which is "the better one". This east-west conflict was mimicking the US hip-hop scene only for commercial reasons and began with rap battles. In 2001 was created the first label which united hiphop artists from the city of Rousse - the Rousse section. Its founders were the infamous MCs the Da Drill and Facta. Da Drill, known as one of the greatest Bulgarian female MCs dropped her album “96” in 2002. In 2001 Ndoe and Mitaka form DRS(Dope Rich Squad) and drop their debut album “Урок#1”(Lesson#1). The album features other artists such as Nasimo(Naste), Scum, The Nachko Orchestra, 187 Clan, Nokaut, Yuliana and others. In 2003 Gazara and Gaidara known as Nokaut released their album “Demo”, inspired by the Irish hiphop group House of Pain. The hiphop group Upsurt dropped their debut album “Bozdugan” in 1999 followed by their second album “Chekai malko” in 2001. X-Team consisting of members Startera, Killa K, Mista P was formed somewhere in the mid 1990s. They dropped their first and only album “Znaniya, mudrost I razbirane” in 2002. In 1999 Yoko and Wosh MC created the group The Top Stoppers. Other artists of this era are Sensei, Consa, Kvartalni Bratya etc.

In the late 2000s and early 2010s some more modern artists such as Dim4ou, Qvkata DLG, 100 Kila and Krisko gained fame.

Some other modern artists, most of which started their careers in the 2010s are Jluch, Gena and Grigovor(So Called Crew), Imera, Sfonk and Bunta(5o’clock), Atila, Secta, Boro Purvi(formerly known as Boreau), Madmatic, Qvkata DLG, SplitKid etc.

In 2020, Trap music , also known as "New wave" era, became the most listened music genre everywhere around the world. Bulgaria is known for its modern artists as V:RGO, MurdaBoyz, MBT and others.

== Culture ==
There are two main trends in Bulgarian hip-hop: mainstream and underground. The first one set by Gumeni Glavi and their label R'n'b Records mirrored the American rap scene as depicted on MTV, complete with grillz, heavy jewelry, scantly clad women, Dirty South/East Coast/West Coast variations.

A notable figure in the developing Hip-hop scene in Bulgaria was Misho Shamara, who established several R&B and Hip-hop clubs as well as a clothing line. Sniper Records was another key player and launched a Hip-hop magazine called "Knockout", the "NGP" video shooting studio, and a number of hip-hop events in Bulgaria and Sofia (such as the Cilvaringz and RZA concerts and the "No borders" Balkan festivals).

== Notable acts ==
The most distinct commercial Bulgarian rappers to date are Misho Shamara, Consa, 100 Kila, and Upsurt.

In 2007, Misho Shamara changed his name to Big Sha, signed to Universal Records and created a new label - Frontline Hustle, which is also signed to Virginia Records/Universal Records.

In 2008, Big Sha released his fifth studio album - Hliab & Amfeti (Bread and Amphetamines), which has guest appearances from Drag-On and Crucial Conflict, Frontline Hustle labelmates. The album was a major success in Bulgaria.

Big Sha was featured on LiLana's song "Dime Piece" together with American rapper Snoop Dogg. The song and the video were released in Bulgaria on April 24, 2009. As announced, this collaboration was probably the most unexpected by the Bulgarian rap fans, but it was made possible by the producer of the song Ariel Rodriguez. Also, this is the first collaboration between a Bulgarian rapper and an American worldwide known rap star.

There are also some Bulgarian mainstream hip-hop artists who collaborate with folk-stars (e.g. Ustata).

The hip-hop scene in Bulgaria consists of numerous performers, including Spens, XA, Wosh & Yoko, X-Team, FARS (Funatic Adventures of Rhyme Sapiens), E.C.C.C - East Coast Cash Crew, Horata na Izgreva DRS+ (Dope Reach Squad working alongside Nokaut since 2002) and even have a representative of the crunk/dirty south movement, in the face of Jentaro and his group Nad Zakona (also known as Above Da Law Clique or just Above Da Law). He is notoriously known not only for his raw lyrics and gimmicks to turn a pending club crowd into a riot, but also for his rough flows and deliveries, often bordering with screaming. On March 31-st, 2010, he alongside other popular Bulgarian hip-hop artists was a supporting act for Lil Jon at his concert in Zala "Universiada" in Sofia, Bulgaria. He is the founder and developer of the crunk style in Bulgaria since 2005, being the first ever to bring it to Europe. Udarnata Grupa (The Striking Team) is the most prominent underground formation in Bulgaria, with no media appearance, a few events in Plovdiv, but with own distinctive style of rapping which is appreciated form those who are familiar with what is to be called "real hip-hop".

Upsurt is also a famous hip-hop group, which has gone from underground to mainstream. Their first album, Bozdugan, was released in 1999 and was based on rude and vulgar rhymes as well as original pop references.

After 2010 the Bulgarian hip hop scene was flooded with new innovative artist including - F.O., Keranov, Qvkata DLG, Dim4ou, Jluch and many others, who became popular with uploading their songs online and later making videoclips for the songs. They became notorious mostly with their lyrics concerning the everyday lifestyle of the Bulgarian youth.

== Festivals ==
The Egasi Festa festival in Burgas in May 2023 bought together several hip hop artists.
