= Tsvetan Tsvetanov =

Bulgarian politician (born 1965)

- Цветан Цветанов
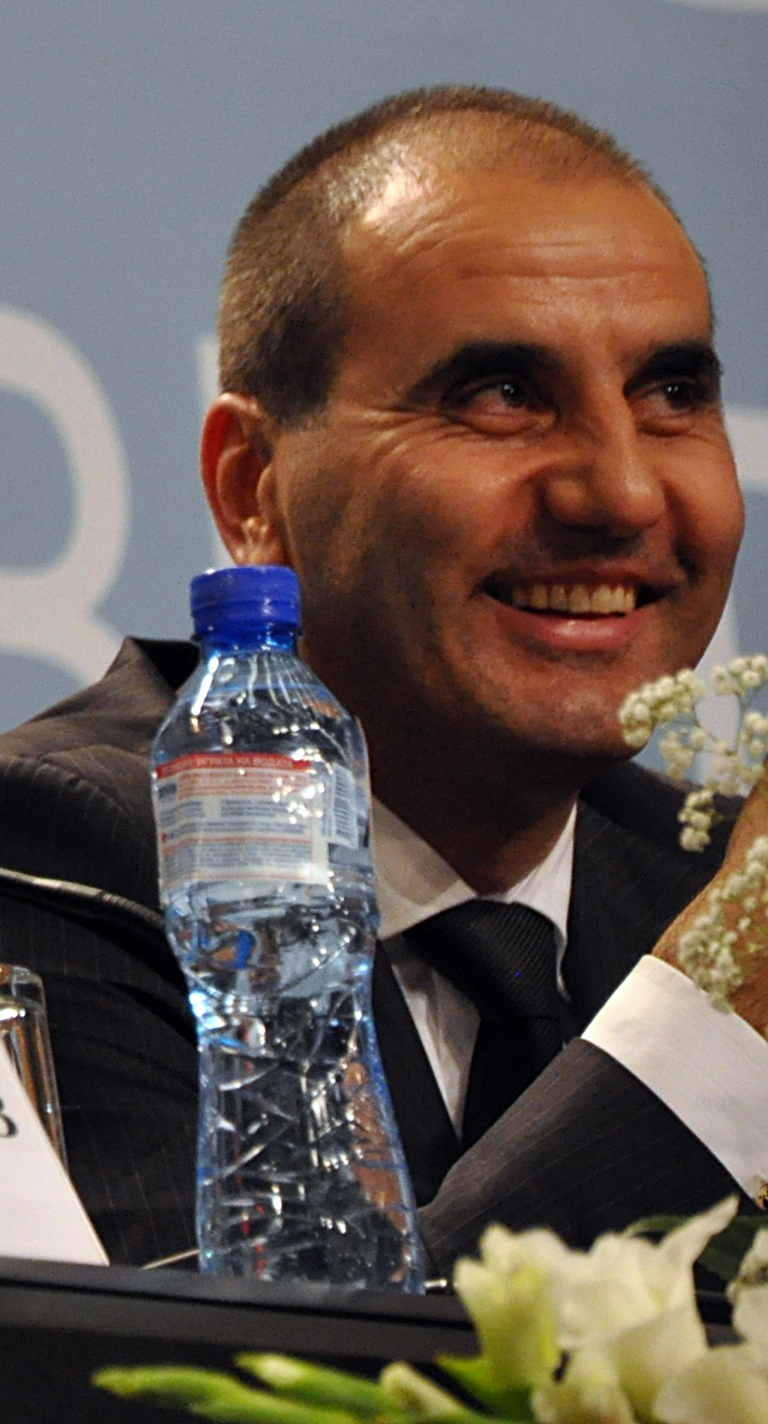
- Tsvetanov in 2009

Member of the National Assembly
- In office 21 May 2013 – 29 March 2019
- Constituency: 1st MMC - Blagoevgrad (2013-2014); 4th MMC - Tarnovo (2014-2019)

Minister of Interior
- In office 27 July 2009 – 13 March 2013
- Prime Minister: Boyko Borisov
- Preceded by: Mihail Mikov
- Succeeded by: Petya Parvanova

Chairman of GERB
- In office 3 December 2006 – 10 January 2010
- Preceded by: Position established
- Succeeded by: Boyko Borisov

Personal details
- Born: Tsvetan Genchev Tsvetanov; 8 April 1965 (age 61) Sofia, PR Bulgaria
- Party: Republicans for Bulgaria (since 2020)
- Other political affiliations: GERB (until 2019)
- Spouse: Desislava Tsvetanova (m. 1993)
- Children: 3
- Education: National Sports Academy; University of National and World Economy
- Occupation: Politician

Tsvetan Genchev Tsvetanov (Bulgarian: Цветан Генчев Цветанов; born 8 April 1965) is a Bulgarian politician and former government official. He served as the chairman of the GERB party until 2009. On 8 July 2009, following his party's victory in the 2009 parliamentary election, he was designated Minister of the Interior by party leader Boyko Borisov.

Tsvetanov's tenure as Minister of the Interior was marked by controversy. He eventually distanced himself from Borisov after facing pressure to resign from his leadership roles within the party due to his involvement in a real estate corruption scandal. Tsvetanov left the party and established the political party Republicans for Bulgaria, alongside other former GERB members who had defected.

== Career ==
Born in Bulgaria's capital city, Sofia, Tsvetanov, holds a degree from the National Sports Academy and a postgraduate degree in law from the University of National and World Economy.

From 2001 to 2005, Tsvetanov was operative assistant to Boyko Borisov, who was Chief Secretary of the Ministry of the Interior. During this period, Tsvetanov also held the position of director of the ministry's management department. He left alongside Borisov, who faced accusations of collaborating with organized crime while in that role. Following the establishment of GERB in 2006, Tsvetanov assumed the role of party chairman until 2009. As Borisov was unable to head GERB due to his position as the mayor of Sofia, Tsvetanov was seen as his closest associate. However, Borisov retained an informal leadership role within the party.

From July 2009 to March 2013, Tsvetanov served as Deputy Prime Minister and Minister of Interior in the first government led by Borisov. During his tenure, Tsvetanov assisted in neutralizing several organized crime groups. The hit-and-run group "The Killers" was apprehended and sentenced to life in prison. The kidnapping group "The Impudent" received a cumulative sentence of 444 years.

Tsvetanov received the Silver Cross for Civil Merit of the Civil Guard of Spain, Spain's highest law enforcement award, for his international police cooperation. The award was presented to him by Spain's Minister of Interior, Jorge Fernández Díaz. Tsvetanov was also honored as an Honorary Member of the Carabinieri Association for successful joint law enforcement operations with the Italian Carabinieri. Tsvetanov was elected as a permanent representative in the Management Board of Europol's Joint Group for Parliamentary Control on 25 September 2018.

Tsvetanov was the chair of the Standing Parliamentary Committee on Internal Security and Public Order in the 44th National Assembly.

He has been a Member of Parliament in the 41st, 42nd, 43rd, and 44th National Assemblies.

== Scandals and charges ==
=== Real estate scandal ===
Tsvetanov's reputation faced scrutiny in 2011 when media reports surfaced regarding his ownership of multiple expensive properties in the capital city. The Tax Administration conducted an audit, which revealed that he possessed six apartments—an acquisition that appeared financially challenging for someone in public administration. Tsvetanov provided explanations regarding the origins of these apartments after entering politics in 2006, asserting that they were purchased by his mother-in-law. However, the tax case was reopened in June 2013 due to the emergence of new evidence suggesting that two of the apartments might have been gifted to him in exchange for a lucrative government contract.

=== Wiretapping scandal ===
In May 2013, Tsvetanov was indicted on two charges of wiretapping members of the GERB government and parliamentary deputies. In a television interview, former agriculture minister Miroslav Naydenov confirmed the charges, describing specific instances when the wiretapping occurred. Despite the general prosecutor's claims, Tsvetanov has consistently denied these allegations. However, three members of the wiretapping unit at the Interior Ministry independently confirmed the existence of the wiretapping incidents. A further charge on obstruction of justice was added in July 2013 which Naydenov also substantiated.

=== Charges of embezzlement ===
Tsvetanov was charged with embezzling BGN 50000 from the budget of the Ministry of Interior. "The sum was allegedly embezzled to the benefit of another person, Orlin Todorov, former head of the anti-mafia unit in Veliko Tarnovo." He was jailed for four years.

=== Apartment scandal and resignation ===
In 2019, Bulgarian media exposed an "Apartment Gate" scandal, which implicated several government officials, including Tsvetanov, in alleged corruption deals. Reports claimed that Tsvetanov had accepted a luxury apartment in a prestigious building at a significantly discounted price, less than one-third of its market value. These allegations emerged alongside key legislation that appeared to benefit the same company responsible for providing the apartments, including approval for the construction of a 30-story skyscraper in one of Sofia's most prestigious neighborhoods. Despite the seriousness of the allegations, the Bulgarian prosecution office chose not to investigate further, concluding that there was insufficient evidence to link Tsvetanov to corruption or any other criminal activities.

Nonetheless, due to mounting pressure, Tsvetanov faced internal repercussions within the GERB party. He was compelled to resign from his leadership positions by GERB leader Boyko Borisov and was subsequently demoted to an ordinary party member.

== Formation of Republicans for Bulgaria ==
In June 2020, Tsvetanov decided to sever ties with GERB completely and announced his departure from the party. He revealed his intention to establish his own political party, citing his disconnection from Borisov and expressing discontent with the perceived inconsistencies and chaos caused by Borisov's government. Later in the same year, Tsvetanov founded the Republicans for Bulgaria party, which he believed would face repression under Borisov's government. The party primarily consisted of former members of GERB who had defected and some individuals who had left other right-wing political parties to join Republicans for Bulgaria.

== Personal life ==
Tsvetanov is married to Desislava and has three daughters - Gergana, Vasilena, and Sofia.
