= Vienna In Love =

Vienna in Love
- Origin: London, England, UK
- Genres: Alternative rock
- Years active: 2011–present
- Members: Victor Cobbs
- Website: viennainlove.co.uk

Vienna in Love are a British alternative rock band, formed in London in 2011 by singer-guitarist Victor Cobbs and guitarist Branko Stefanovic. Vienna in Love's influences include The Cure, Placebo, Echo & the Bunnymen, Kent, and U2. Their single "Tokyo" was ranked at number 7 on The MTV Adria 's Top 20 Domaćica Chart on 2 October 2016.

== Touring ==
Vienna in Love tour in various countries from Europe and the United States, They also performed at various music festivals like Exit Festival and Arenal Sound

== Awards and nominations ==
Year	Organisation	Award	Result
2016	MTV Adria	Domaćica Top 20 Chart	Seventh
2016	Crystal Palace International Film Festival	Best Music Video	Nominated
2017	Miami International Sci-Fi Film Festival	Best Music Video	Second

== Discography ==
=== Studio albums ===
- A Modern British Icon (2013)

=== EPs and singles ===
- Love Is Like War (2011)
- Bushido (Remixes) (2015)
- Tokyo (2016)
