= Boyko Borisov =

Prime Minister of Bulgaria (2009–2013; 2014–2017; 2017–2021)

- Бойко Борисов
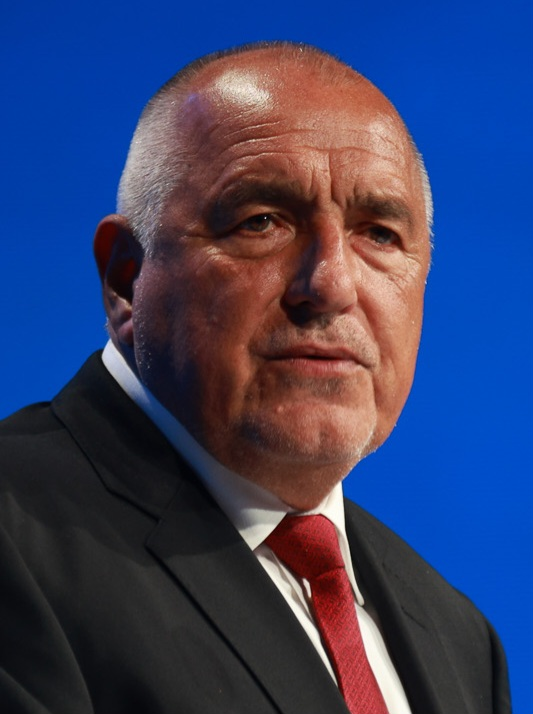
- Borisov in 2025

Prime Minister of Bulgaria
- In office 4 May 2017 – 12 May 2021
- President: Rumen Radev
- Deputy: See list: Tomislav Donchev; Krasimir Karakachanov; Ekaterina Zaharieva; Mariyana Nikolova
- Preceded by: Ognyan Gerdzhikov
- Succeeded by: Stefan Yanev
- In office 7 November 2014 – 27 January 2017
- President: Rosen Plevneliev; Rumen Radev
- Deputy: See list: Tomislav Donchev; Rumyana Bachvarova; Meglena Kuneva; Ivailo Kalfin
- Preceded by: Georgi Bliznashki
- Succeeded by: Ognyan Gerdzhikov
- In office 27 July 2009 – 13 March 2013
- President: Georgi Parvanov; Rosen Plevneliev
- Deputy: See list: Simeon Dyankov; Tsvetan Tsvetanov
- Preceded by: Sergey Stanishev
- Succeeded by: Marin Raykov

Member of the National Assembly
- Incumbent
- Assumed office 12 April 2023
- Constituency: 16th MMC – Plovdiv
- In office 21 May 2013 – 7 November 2014
- Succeeded by: Anna Aleksandrova
- Constituency: 25th MMC – Sofia

Leader of GERB
- Incumbent
- Assumed office 10 January 2010
- Preceded by: Tsvetan Tsvetanov

Mayor of Sofia
- In office 10 November 2005 – 27 July 2009
- Preceded by: Stefan Sofiyanski
- Succeeded by: Yordanka Fandakova

Personal details
- Born: Boyko Metodiev Borisov; 13 June 1959 (age 67) Sofia, PR Bulgaria
- Party: GERB (since 2006)
- Other political affiliations: Communist (before 1990); NDSV (2001–2005); Independent (2005–2006)
- Spouse: Stela Borisova (divorced)
- Children: Veneta Borisova
- Education: Academy of the Ministry of Interior, in Sofia
- Website: www.boykoborissov.bg
Association football career
- Position: Forward
Senior career*
Years	Team	Apps	(Gls)
2013–2014	Vitosha Bistritsa	2	(0)
- * Club domestic league appearances and goals

Boyko Metodiev Borisov (Note: Bulgarian: Бойко Методиев Борисов, pronounced [ˈbɔjko mɛˈtɔdiɛf boˈrisof]) (born 13 June 1959) is a Bulgarian politician who served as Prime Minister of Bulgaria on three separate occasions, serving a total of 9 years between 2009 and 2021, making him the country's longest-serving post-communist Prime Minister. A member of the GERB party, which he founded and currently leads, he previously served as Mayor of Sofia from 2005 to 2009. Borisov remains politically active to date and currently serves as a Member of the National Assembly.

Borisov was elected mayor of Sofia in 2005. In December 2005, he was the founding chair of the conservative political party Citizens for European Development of Bulgaria (GERB), becoming its lead candidate in the 2009 general election. Borisov led GERB to a landslide victory in 2009, defeating the incumbent Socialist Party, and resigned as mayor of Sofia to be sworn in as prime minister. He resigned in 2013, following nationwide protests against the government's energy policy, but after leading GERB to victory in the 2014 general election, he was again named Bulgaria's prime minister. His second term ended similarly to his first, after Borisov resigned in January 2017, this time following GERB's defeat in the 2016 presidential election. As before, Borisov led GERB to election victory again in the snap 2017 general election, becoming prime minister for a third time.

Borisov-led governing coalitions, Bulgaria experienced an improvement in macroeconomic situation and general political stability; however, it remained the EU's poorest member state (in terms of GDP per capita), with nearly a quarter of its population living below the national poverty lines. Foreign direct investment fell, and corruption has led, as recently as June 2019, to repeated rejection of Bulgaria's attempts to join the Schengen Area. Electoral results for Borisov and his party were overshadowed by allegations of fraud in 2013, 2015, and in 2019, both locally and for the European Parliament. Judicial threats and attacks against journalists increased to the point where journalism in Bulgaria became "dangerous" according to Reporters Without Borders, which ranked Bulgaria 111th globally in press freedom in 2019. In 2019, former U.S. Ambassador to Bulgaria James Pardew stated that a "national political environment with little government or criminal accountability and no serious opposition to challenge the current government" was in place as a result of collusion, corruption, and stifling of the media under Borisov. On 17 March 2022, Borisov was detained after allegations of misuse of EU funds; he was released after spending 24 hours in prison.

In 2013, Borisov became the oldest person ever to play for a Bulgarian professional club when he appeared for FC Vitosha Bistritsa in the B Group, the second division of Bulgarian football.

== Early life and family ==
Borisov was born in 1959 in Bankya (then a village, today a town, part of Stolichna Municipality) to the Ministry of Internal Affairs official Metodi Borisov and elementary school teacher Veneta Borisova. Borisov has claimed that his grandfather was executed by the communists for being a Nikola Petkov supporter in the wake of the 1944 Bulgarian coup d'état. This has been disputed, however, as Nikola Petkov was still an ally of the communist insurgents in 1944. Furthermore, Borisov's later rise within the ranks of the communist-era security services would have been unlikely with such a family background. Other sources point out that Borisov's grandfather either died during a criminal incident or that both his grandfathers died peacefully in the 1960s and 1970s.

In 1977, Borisov graduated from Bankya High School with excellent grades. Between 1982 and 1990, he assumed different positions in the Ministry of Internal Affairs as a firefighter and later as a professor at the Police Academy in Sofia. As a National Security Office member, Borisov took part in the protection of crops and haylofts during the name-changing campaign towards ethnic Turks in the 1980s. From 1985 to 1990, Borisov was a lecturer at the Higher Institute for Police Officers Training and Scientific Research of the Ministry of Interior.

Borisov quit the Ministry in 1991 with the rank of major, after formally refusing to renounce his Communist Party membership or "depoliticise". In 1991, he founded a private security company, Ipon-1. He subsequently became bodyguard to Bulgaria's last communist leader, Todor Zhivkov, after the latter was overthrown in 1989, and to Simeon II. Borisov has been claiming participation in karate championships since 1978, serving as the coach of the Bulgarian national team and a referee of international matches. He said to United States President Barack Obama that he has a 7th dan black belt in karate, but his coach denied this, and stated that Borisov has never even been a karate competitor, but only an administrator of the team.

Borisov is divorced, but for a number of years lived with Tsvetelina Borislavova, head of Bulgarian American Credit Bank. Borisov has a daughter, Veneta, from his former marriage to the physician Stela. Borisov also has a sister, Krasimira Ivanova.

== Civil servant ==
Boyko Borisov was the Chief Secretary of the Bulgarian Ministry of Interior between 2001 and 2005, with the rank of General. During that period, he became famous for getting the notorious mobster Sreten Jocić apprehended.

In the 2005 Bulgarian parliamentary election, he was a parliamentary candidate of the National Movement Simeon II; he was elected in two regions but decided to retain his job as Chief Secretary of the Ministry. Later in 2005, he resigned from that post, instead of standing as a candidate in the mayoral election in Sofia. He was elected as Mayor and succeeded Stefan Sofiyanski. He was re-elected in the 2007 election.

== First term as prime minister of Bulgaria ==
Borisov's party GERB also won the 2009 Bulgarian parliamentary election, collecting 39.72% of the popular vote and 117 of the 240 seats in parliament.

Since 27 July 2009, Borisov served as Prime Minister of Bulgaria in a GERB-dominated centre-right minority government with parliamentary support from three other parliamentary groups, including the nationalist party Ataka. He invited several non-party-affiliated experts to the government, most prominent among them Simeon Dyankov, a former high-ranking World Bank Group official, and Rosen Plevneliev, manager of a large German subsidiary in Bulgaria.

=== Domestic policy ===
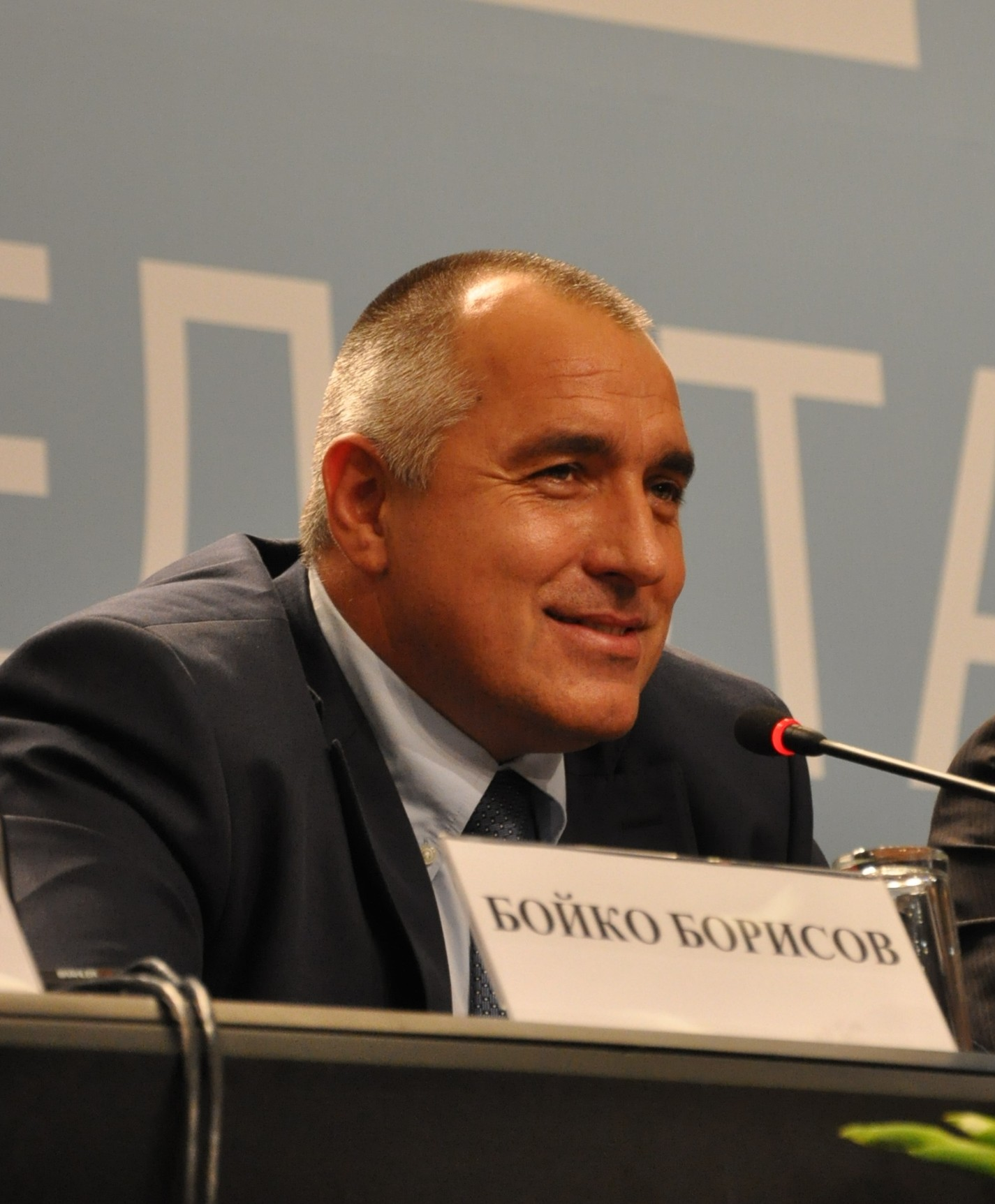
Borisov in 2009

Borisov's stated policies were mostly aimed at curbing corruption in the public administration and building an adequate infrastructure. One of the main goals in this direction was the expansion of the national motorway network, of which Lyulin was the first motorway to be completed. The government also approved a strategy for the development of the energy sector until 2020, which includes the completion of gas interconnectors with Greece, Romania, and Turkey and expanding renewable energy capacities. The Borisov government stopped the Belene Nuclear Power Plant project after the Fukushima nuclear accident. The acquisition of European funds has increased from 2.6% to 20%.

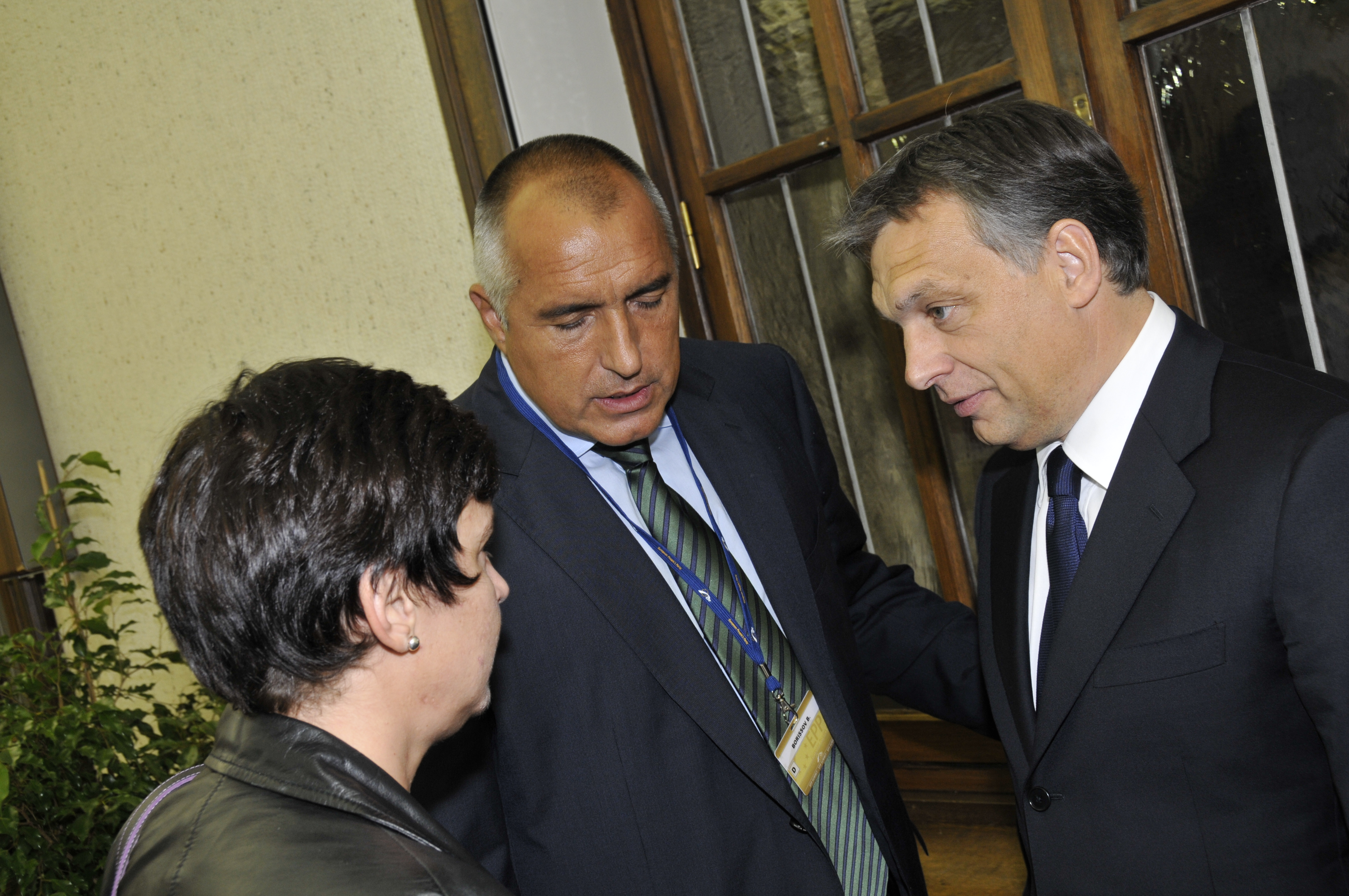
Borisov with Hungarian Prime Minister Viktor Orbán, September 2010

Specialized police actions have tackled corruption in the administration, and several high-profile members of the organized crime groups have been imprisoned, though as of May 2011, there was little improvement in the rule of law. At the same time, the government has been criticized by other EU members for the erosion of media freedom, falling attractiveness to investors, and continuing mafia activities. These criticisms were repeatedly leveled against Deputy Prime Minister Tsvetan Tsvetanov, who is formally under investigation for wiretapping members of the government and parliament. During his trial, his actions were found to be justified. Media leaks raised suspicions that Borisov may have tried to interfere in the case.

According to France 24, "Once in power, he toured the country incessantly to inaugurate infrastructure projects but failed to enact structural reforms or to tackle the rampant corruption and organized crime that Brussels has long complained about." In January 2011, Euractiv wrote, "The ineffective judiciary has been largely unable to send to jail any high-profile criminals."

Borisov is a strong supporter of the total smoking ban. Although initially removing the ban introduced by the previous government, the Borisov Cabinet reintroduced it in 2012 with the aim to reduce the number of smokers from 40% of the population to about 15–20%. By 2013, the ban had led to a 3–4% decrease in cigarette sales.

Following public opposition Borisov's government banned hydraulic fracturing for shale gas exploration and extraction. A permit granted to Chevron for shale gas exploration was revoked, and any violation of the ban is subject to a 100 million leva ($58 million) fine.

Protests of doctors and other health professionals broke out in 2010 over failure to reform the health care sector, resulting in delayed payments and salaries. In March 2010, health minister Bozhidar Nanev resigned over a conflict of interest scandal. He was replaced by Anna-Maria Borisova, whom Boyko Borisov met accidentally on an intersection near Veliko Tarnovo and decided was fit to carry out the reform. She resigned a mere six months later, failing to implement any reforms.

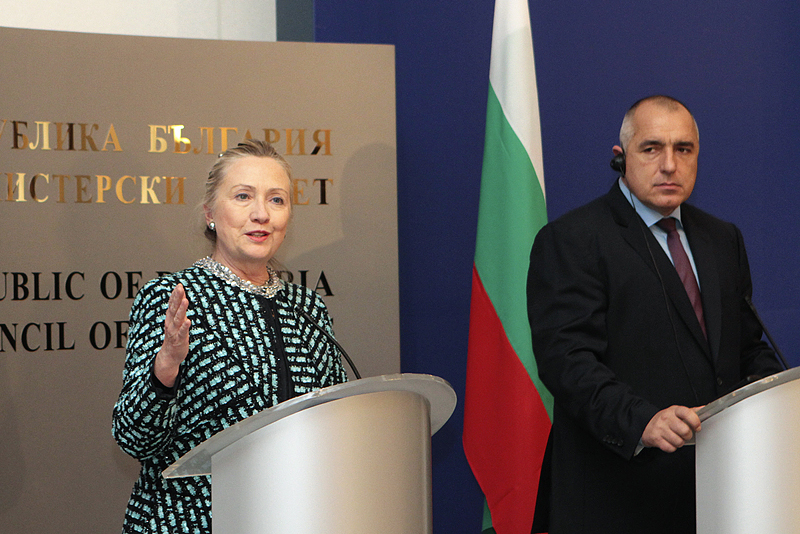
Hillary Clinton holds a joint press conference with Borisov at the Council of Ministers in Sofia, Bulgaria, on 5 February 2012.

=== Resignation ===
France's TotalEnergies energy company was granted an oil and gas exploration licence in 2012 to prospect for fossil fuels in Bulgaria's economic area of the Black Sea. TotalEnergies won the tender in competition with ExxonMobil and United Kingdom's Melrose Resources, which had – as of 2012 – three exploration licences for areas of Bulgaria's Black Sea shelf. This decision was hotly debated by the political opposition and led to the start of nationwide strikes in the fall and winter of 2012.

Following the new eruption of nationwide protests on 12 February 2013 over high energy costs, low living standards and corruption, Borisov and his government resigned on 20 February. Before that, Borisov had accepted the resignation of Finance Minister Simeon Djankov after a dispute over farm subsidies and promised a cut in power prices and punishing foreign-owned companies—a potential risk in damaging Bulgaria–Czech Republic relations—but protests continued. He then said: "I will not participate in a government under which police are beating people." The election due in summer was rescheduled for 12 May 2013. Djankov's resignation was a blow to Borisov's center-right credentials, since Djankov spearheaded the reforms during their term in office. He was also regarded as able manager of the public administration.

The European People's Party expressed support for Borisov a month before the 2013 parliamentary elections.

Later in April, Borisov's former Agriculture minister Miroslav Naydenov revealed that the government had spied on several cabinet ministers, business figures and the opposition under orders of Tsvetan Tsvetanov, deputy chairman of GERB. Several members of parliament corroborated these claims, as well as members of the wiretapping unit in the Interior Ministry.

== Second term as prime minister of Bulgaria ==
=== Domestic policy ===
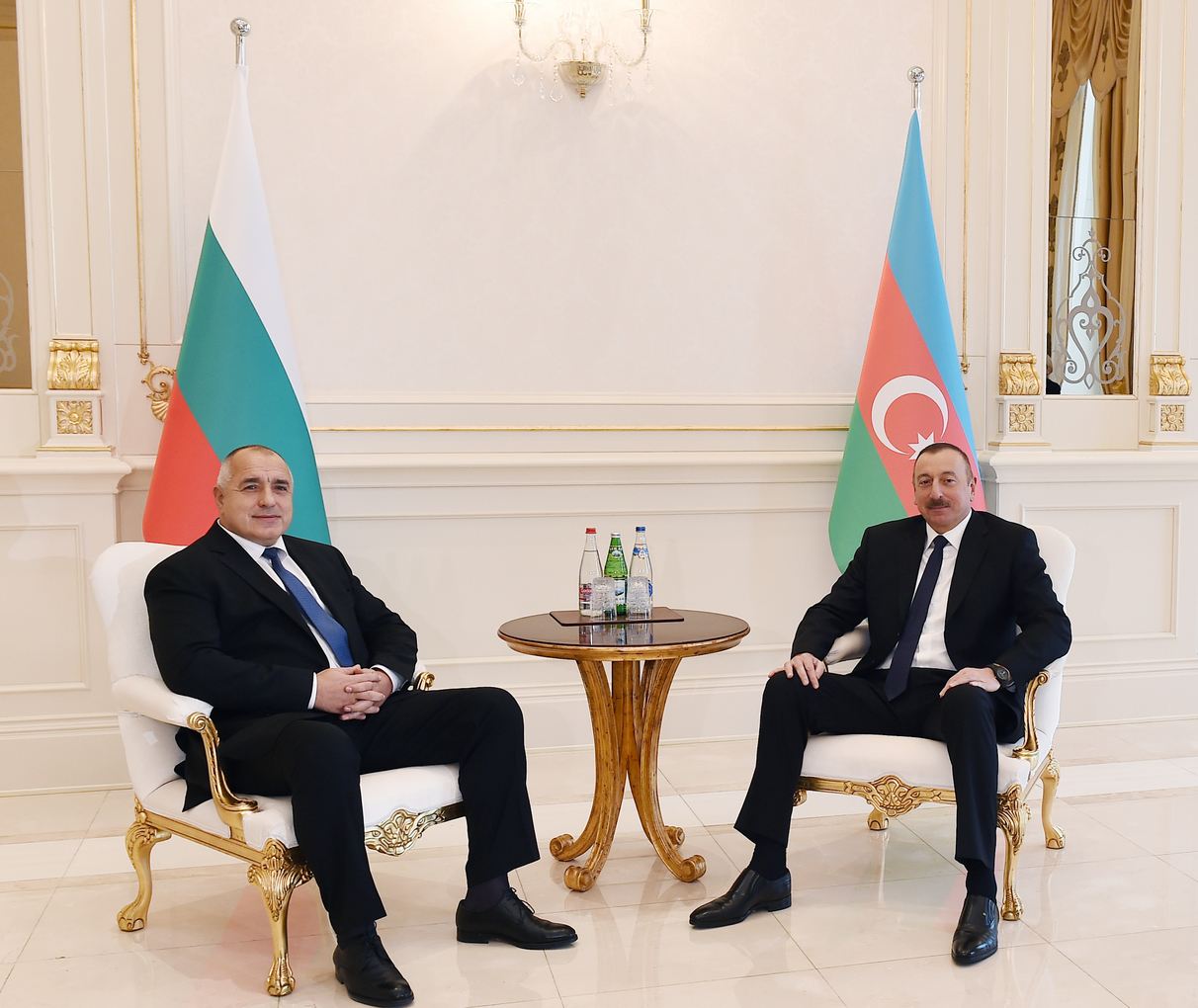
Borisov with Ilham Aliyev.

During Borisov's second government, the business climate and promised reforms took a nosedive. "Reforms failed to get off the ground, in particular, changes to the justice system and plans to help cash-strapped schools and the creaking health care system". Additionally, Bulgaria's parliament rejected an anti-corruption law.

The cultivation of genetically modified crops was banned in 2015.

=== Foreign policy ===
Borisov's government saw the cancellation of the South Stream gas pipeline project. Russia and Gazprom lobbied for the pipeline's construction, which would have circumvented existing, insecure gas pipelines passing through Ukraine, and would have continued into Central Europe. Borisov's government instead emphasized an interconnector link with Romania, Greece, Turkey and Serbia, to redistribute natural gas from multiple sources.

A fence was built along the border with Turkey to stem the flow of migrants during the European migrant crisis. Border control was also tightened. Some 17,000 people were detained by October 2016, down by more than a third compared to 2015. A riot broke out in a migrant camp near Harmanli in 2016, prompting a police response with water cannons and rubber bullets, and later a closure of the camp.

== Third term as prime minister of Bulgaria ==
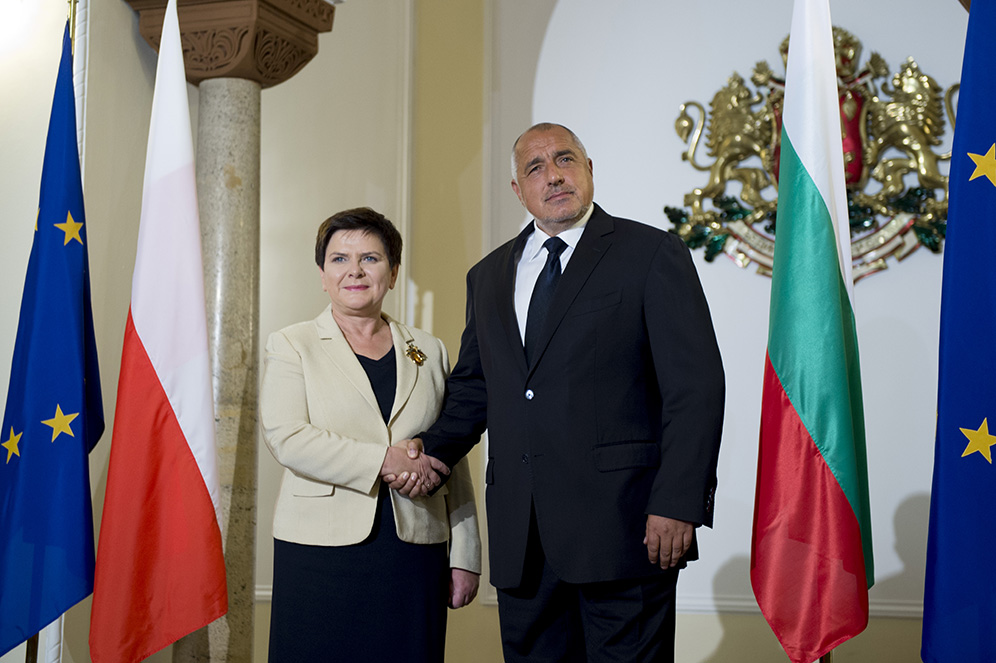
Borisov with Polish Prime Minister Beata Szydło, September 2017

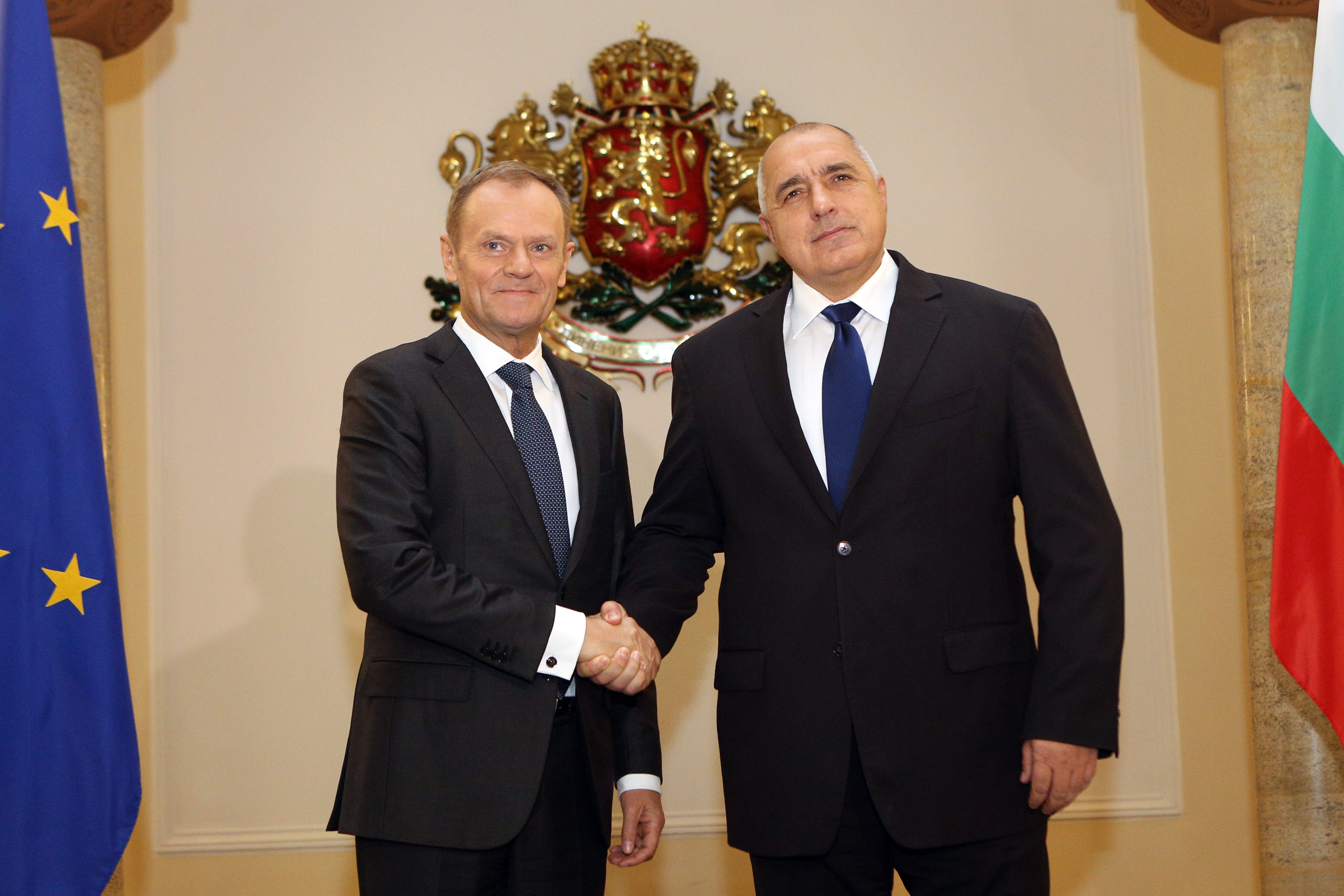
Borisov with the President of the European Council, Donald Tusk, January 2018

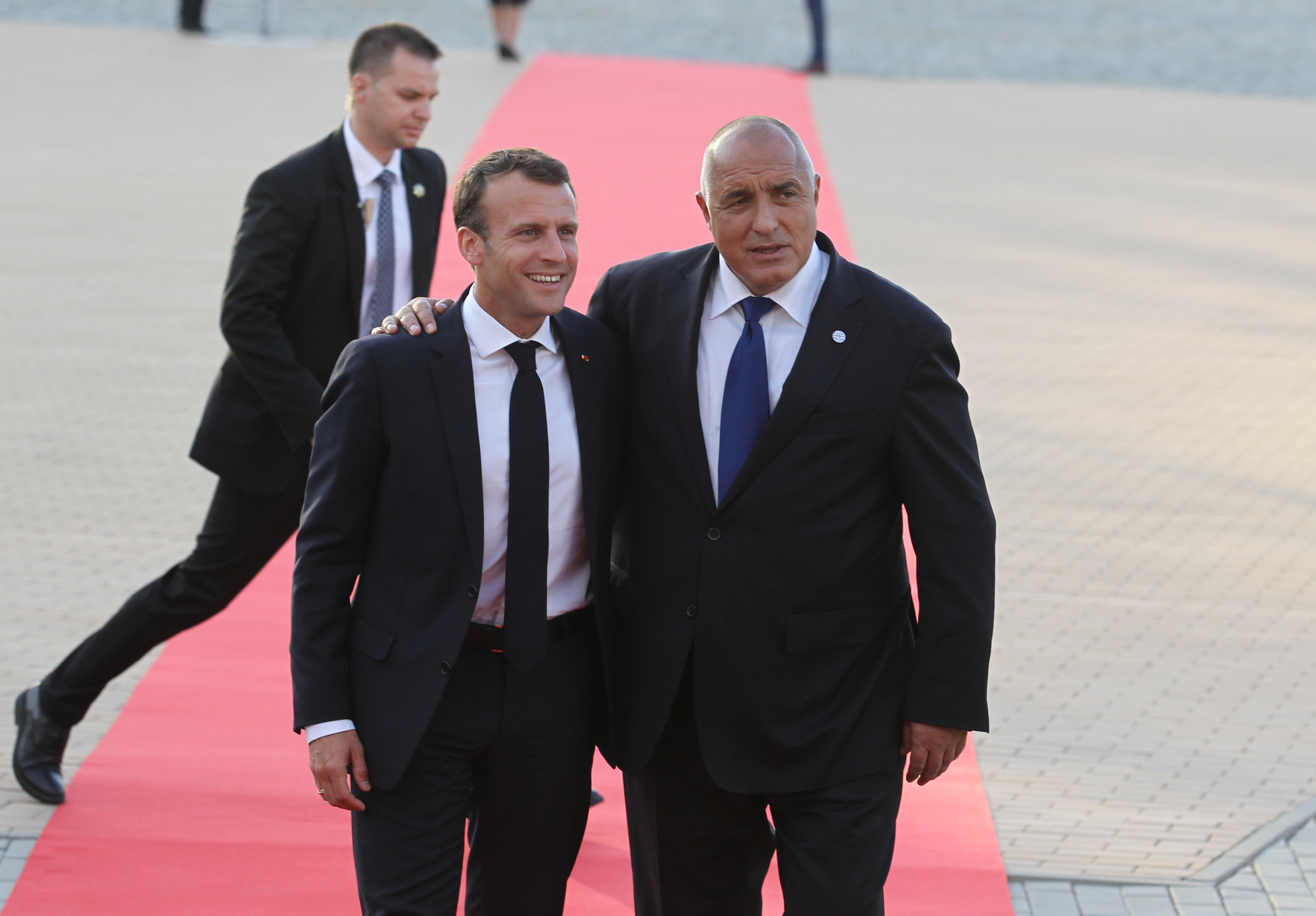
Borisov with French President Emmanuel Macron, May 2018

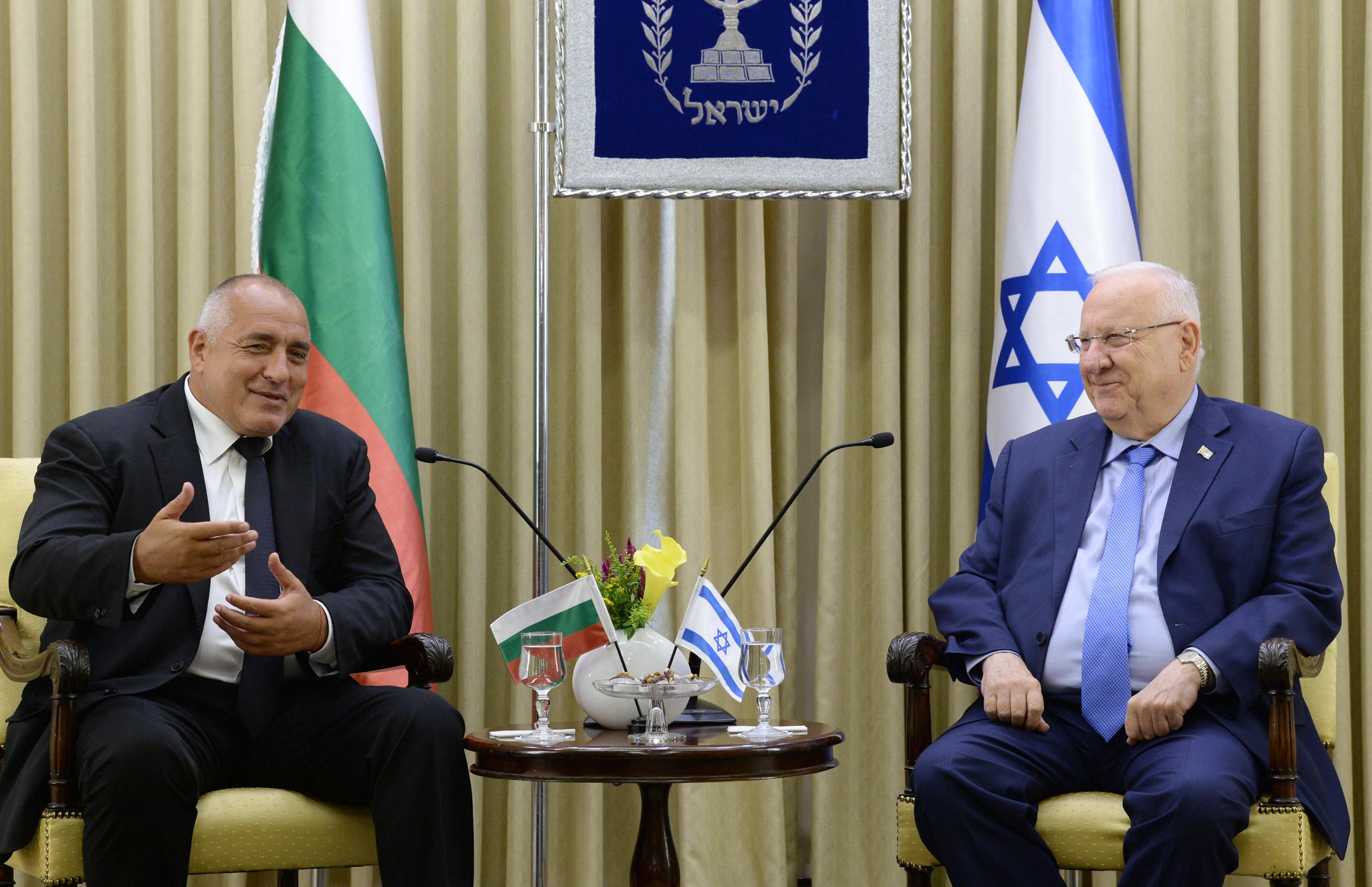
Borisov with Israeli President Reuven Rivlin, June 2018

After the 2017 parliamentary elections, Borisov became prime minister again, beginning his third term in this position. On 27 April, President Rumen Radev handed Borisov the mandate for the forming of Bulgaria's new government. Reuters wrote, "Bulgaria's centre-right GERB party signed a coalition agreement on Thursday [4/27/17] with a nationalist alliance that will bring former prime minister Boiko Borisov back to power for his third term since 2009". By 2018, foreign direct investment had collapsed to 2% of GDP, or $1.13 billion. A number of major foreign companies, including E.ON, Modern Times Group, ČEZ Group, Société Générale and Telenor initiated their withdrawal from the Bulgarian market either due to poor profitability or corruption and government interference.

In June 2018 a public tender was launched to build the natural gas interconnector link with Turkey. Borisov's plans to build a Balkan Gas Hub near Varna aims to ensure competition between Russian gas supplies from TurkStream, Azerbaijani gas and liquefied natural gas (LNG) delivered via Greece. However, analyst Vasko Nachev noted that the gas connection to Greece is not linked to any transiting gas pipelines and that the anticipated new delivery routes are "non-existent".

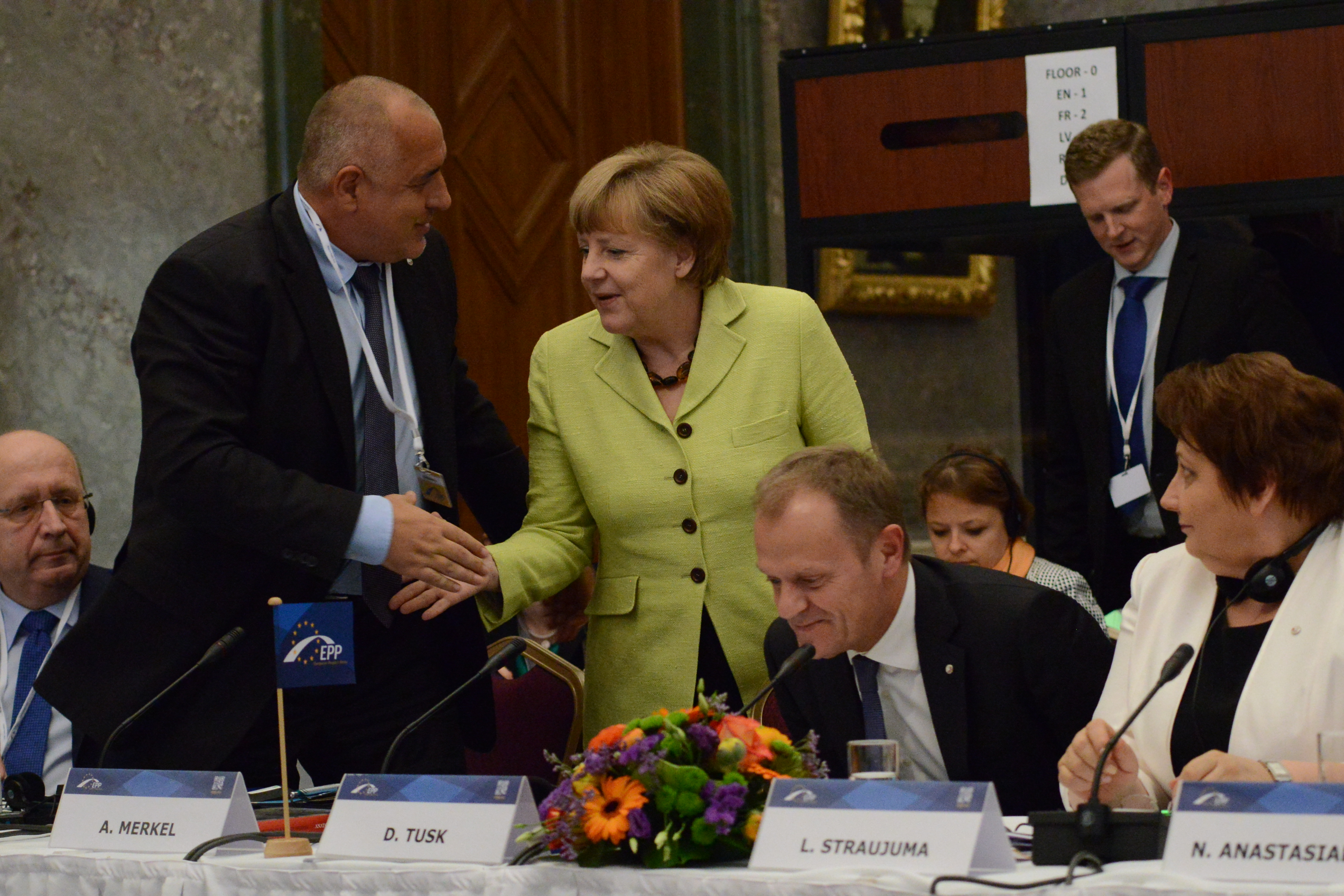
Boyko Borisov and Angela Merkel (2015)

During a regional summit Borisov announced that Bulgaria will participate in a joint bid for the 2030 FIFA World Cup and the UEFA Euro 2028 with Serbia, Romania and Greece.

Borisov received the Order of the Republic of Serbia in February 2019. He thanked the Serbian president in the name of Bulgarian people, promised to further help Serbian EU agenda and the overall relations of the two neighboring states.

In March 2019 a journalist investigation revealed that real estate company Arteks had sold a luxury property at prices sharply lower than the market value to a number of senior government officials. These include justice minister Tsetska Tsacheva, GERB deputy chairman Tsvetan Tsvetanov and deputy sports minister Vanya Koleva, who all subsequently resigned. Deputy Energy minister Krasimir Parvanov, Supreme Judicial Council member Gergana Mutafova and GERB MP Vezhdi Rashidov had also obtained sub-market price real estate from Arteks. Additionally, anti-corruption commission head Plamen Georgiev, National Investigative Service head Borislav Sarafov and tourism minister Nikolina Angelkova were implicated in similar schemes. Another journalist investigation also revealed that, back in 2015, the anti-corruption commission under Plamen Georgiev had terminated an investigation into irregularities in Tsvetan Tsvetanov's declared revenue and real estate evaluations.

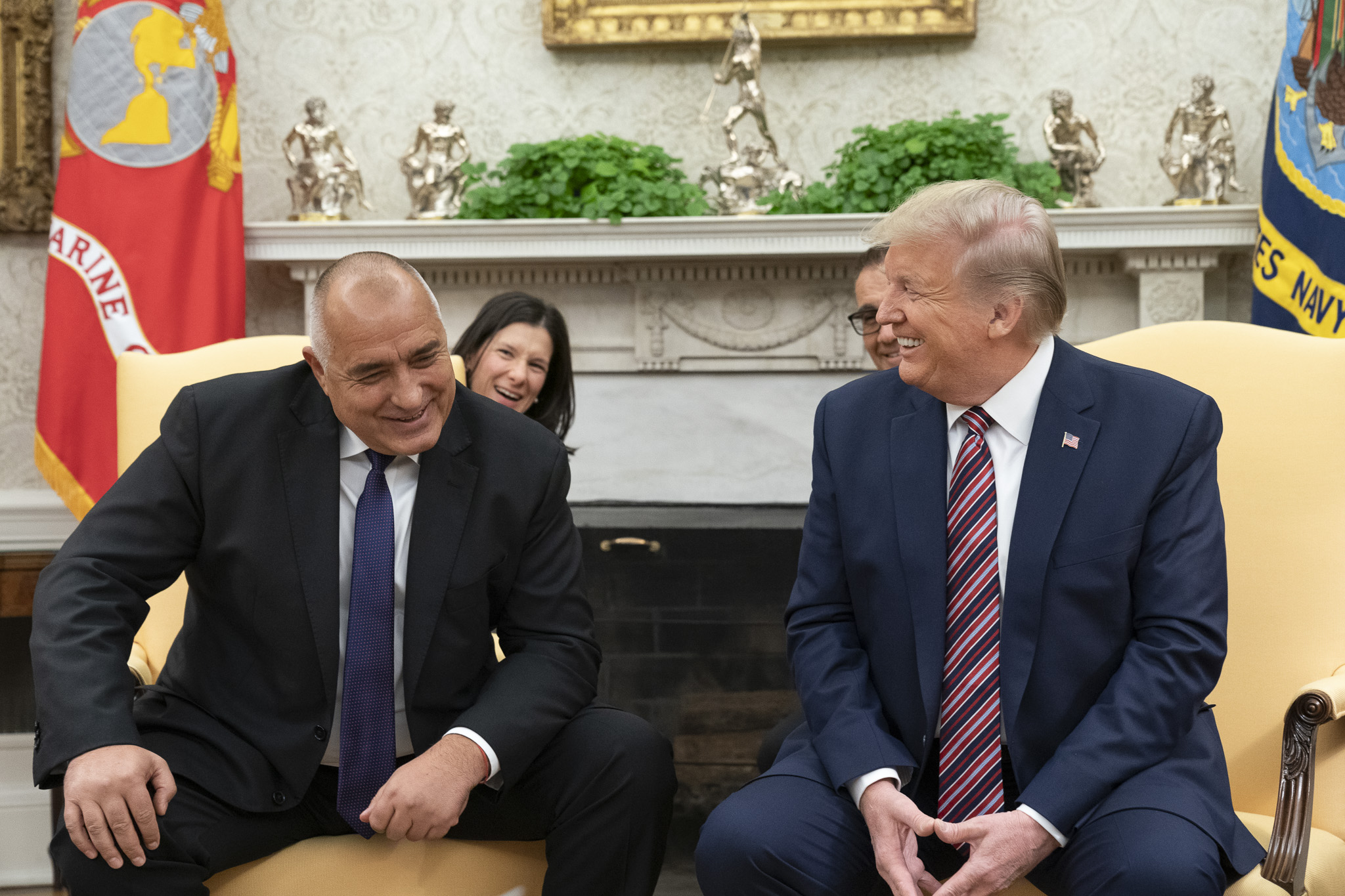
President Donald Trump meets with Boyko Borisov on 25 November 2019, in the Oval Office of the White House.

Further investigations revealed that Borisov's deputy economy minister, Aleksandar Manolev, built a private dwelling using funds from an EU development program. Numerous similar estates, built as bed and breakfast houses using EU funds, were revealed to have been used as private property in a similar manner. Overall, 749 guesthouses were revealed to have been built under the programme since 2007. The Attorney General's office launched an investigation following the reports.

Borisov's government received further criticism for its handling of African swine fever virus outbreaks which caused the culling of tens of thousands of pigs in several regions in July 2019. EU Health and Food Safety commissioner Vytenis Andriukaitis said that Bulgaria "had not done much" to prevent the outbreak and was facing the prospect of losing its entire pig farming industry to the disease. Additionally, culled pigs were hastily buried, sometimes close to bodies of water, instead of incinerated, as the Bulgarian Food Safety Agency had previously closed down an incinerator in the affected region.

In October 2019 Borisov urged European Union to stop its criticism of Turkey, adding that Bulgaria's relations with Turkey are good-neighbourly. Several days later on 15 October, Bulgaria turned harsher, condemning the Turkish offensive into north-eastern Syria and firmly insisting that it immediately stop.

On 25 October 2020 Borisov tested positive for COVID-19. He said on Facebook that he had "general malaise." By 10 November, he had made a recovery from the disease. While Bulgaria initially reacted quickly by taking strong measures against COVID-19 in March 2020, Borisov's handling of the pandemic subsequently drew sharp criticism as the country was severely affected during the autumn months after a loosening of restrictions over the course of the summer season.

After the April 2021 Bulgarian parliamentary election, wherein GERB, while coming first, seemed unlikely to form a government, Borisov made a statement commending GERBs electoral performance and denigrating the result of other parties, while simultaneously offering the possibility of co-governance.

During a cabinet session on 7 April Borisov once again criticised the other parliamentary parties for refusing to cooperate with GERB, however made a surprising offer to provide "10 MPs" in order to support a government formed by Slavi Trifonov.

On 14 April Borisov confirmed that he would not be GERB's nomination for the position of prime minister during the subsequent round of government formation.

On 15 April Borisov officially submitted the resignation of his cabinet to the National Assembly, With the cabinet's resignation being approved by the National Assembly on the following day, despite attempted obstruction by GERB MPs. Subsequently, Borisov took the role of acting prime minister.

Immediately after the acceptance of his resignation, Borisov declared his intention to 'go on vacation', posting a picture of himself playing football with his two grandchildren on 17 April.

On 19 April Borisov was hospitalised and urgently operated due to suffering a knee injury while playing football. On 20 April, Borisov was seen walking within the hospital and interacting with other patients.

On 21 April Borisov released a video of himself petting his dog, Borko, at his residence in the town of Bankya, which was seen as a provocation to the National Assembly which had summoned him to appear to parliament on the day. On the day Borisov also claimed he would participate in the upcoming presidential elections if a caretaker government was appointed.

On 12 May after the failure of governments formations, Borisov officially ceased to be prime minister, being replaced by Stefan Yanev in a caretaker capacity.

=== Minister of Energy and Natural Resources of the Republic of Türkiye ===
Minister of Energy and Natural Resources of the Republic of Turkey Berat Albayrak met with Bulgarian Prime Minister Boyko Borissov and Energy Minister Temenuzkha Petkova in Sofia. During the meetings, cooperation in the fields of natural gas and electricity was discussed and an agreement was reached to activate the high cooperation potential in these areas.Berat Albayrak, Sofya'da Temaslarda Bulundu

=== Rivalry with President Radev ===
Borisov spent much of his term locked in an institutional war with President Rumen Radev, the latter an opposition-sponsored independent and former Air Force General that defeated Borisov's preferred candidate in the 2016 Bulgarian presidential election. The two became bitter rivals, accusing each other of leading the country into crisis. This would eventually lead to President Radev supporting the 2020–2021 protests against Borisov's government.

== Post-prime ministerial political activity ==
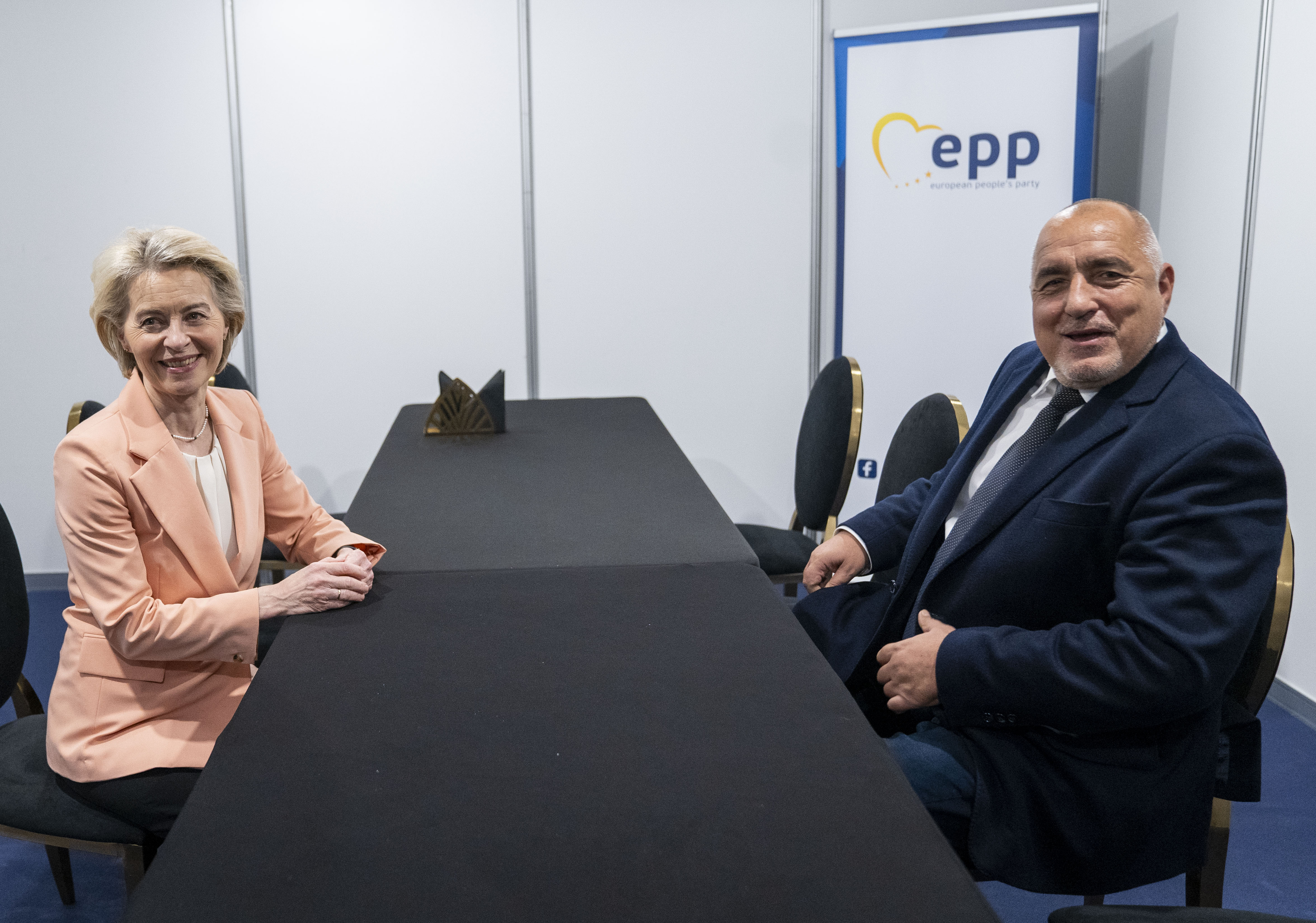
Borisov with President of the European Commission Ursula von der Leyen at the EPP Congress in Bucharest, on 6 March 2024

=== Extra-Parliamentary GERB leader ===
On 11 May, shortly before the end of Borisov's tenure as PM, Borisov initiated a number of changes within the GERB party during the annual conference, including demoting members of the Leadership Council such as Yordanka Fandakova. Similarly, Borisov promised to do more in order to promote "youth" within the GERB party.

In the run-up to the Snap Parliamentary Elections in July, Boyko Borisov engaged in criticism of the Yanev Caretaker Cabinet. For one, Borisov contested claims made by Caretaker Finance Minister, Assen Vassilev, that the government budget lacked funds by pointing to the continuation of COVID-era fiscal policies. Borisov further criticized changes made within the civil service by the Caretaker Government, claiming that they were done in the interest of President Radev.

Borisov particularly engaged in verbal altercations with the Caretaker Minister of Interior, Boyko Rashkov, who he accused of being a Communist and implementing "Radev's orders" to eliminate GERB. In turn, Rashkov accused Borisov of being potentially implicit in criminal activity and of being protected by the General Prosecutor, Ivan Geshev.

On 15 July 2021, Borisov was interrogated by members of the Ministry of Interior in relation to criminal activity. Subsequently, on the 24th of July, Borisov accused Rashkov of being an alcoholic and of attempting to intimidate GERB politicians.

Throughout August 2021, Borisov similarly criticised the parliamentary parties for their inability to form a government and "take responsibility".

During the pre-election campaign for the Snap Parliamentary Elections in November, Borisov made a number of severe criticisms of the Yanev Caretaker Cabinet, claiming he had never seen such a "difficult crisis" as the one created by the Caretaker Cabinet. He further alleged that the Caretaker Cabinet was involved in attempts to "manipulate" the election results.

Despite being a list leader for GERB at all three elections in 2021, Boyko Borisov consistently refused to become an MP.

Following the formation of the Petkov Government, Borisov criticised the new government. Specifically, he attacked the proposed budget of Minister of Finance, Assen Vassilev, who he accused of increasing the national debt and threatening Bulgaria's fiscal stability. Additionally he criticised the response of the governing coalition to the Russian invasion of Ukraine.

==== Legal troubles and arrest ====
On 6 January 2022, Borisov was called for an interrogation by the Ministry of Interior in relation to an ongoing case surrounding money laundering and corruption, with Borisov denying all allegations against his person.

On 2 February, Minister of Interior in the Petkov government, Boyko Rashkov, announced that new case files had arrived to the Ministry about Borisov's activity in the "Barcelona-gate" controversy.

On 17 March 2022, Boyko Borisov was arrested by the Ministry of Interior, together with former Minister of Finance, Vladislav Goranov and GERB media-advisor Sevdalina Arnaudova. The arrest was made due to a signal made by businessman Vasil Bozhkov, to the State Financial Inspection Agency, as well as due to signal's sent by Bulgarian civic organisations to the European Public Prosecutor's Office. His lawyer further confirmed that Borisov was held under suspicion of committing extortion.

The arrest was followed by a mixed reaction in Bulgarian society, with his arrest being celebrated by politicians supporting the incumbent government as an important step in tackling corruption. However, it was also followed by protests organised by GERB outside of the Ministerial Council Building which demanded Borisov's release. Additionally, leading figures of the EPP, including Manfred Weber, condemned the arrest as violating the principles of "rule of law".

Borisov was released from detainment on 18 March, alleging that the country had returned under communist rule and expressing fear for his life. In a later press briefing on 24 March, he claimed that his arrest was related to his support of Euroatlanticist political views and compared himself to Russian opposition leader, Alexei Navalny.

On 5 April, the Specialised Prosecutors Office opened an investigation into the possibility of illegal activity surrounding Borisov's arrest.

The Sofia Administrative Court ruled that Borisov's arrest had taken place illegally on 23 August, thus confirming a prior ruling of the Sofia Regional Court made in April.

== Controversies ==
=== Allegations of corruption and connections with organized crime ===
Periodically ensuing corruption scandals and controversies has led to reports of high levels of corruption in Borisov's government. According to the Corruption Perceptions Index, compiled by Transparency International, Borisov's government was as corrupt as previous governments, with two of his closest ministers – Tzvetan Tzvetanov and Miroslav Naydenov—investigated by the Prosecutor General and the Tax Authority for taking bribes while in office. Borisov has nonetheless campaigned on an anti-corruption message. Despite Borisov's initial promise, no representative of previous cabinets has so far been convicted.

Boyko Borisov was accused of mafia ties by former ambassador to Bulgaria John Beyrle in 2006, in a leaked memo published by Wikileaks, of facilitating and covering up illegal deals with LUKOIL and trafficking methamphetamines.

In 2007 Boyko Borisov was accused by the magazine U.S. Congressional Quarterly (CQ) of being directly linked to the biggest mobsters in Bulgaria. CQ asserted that, "the most powerful politician in Bulgaria, Washington's newest ally in the global war on terror, is a close associate of known mobsters and linked to almost 30 unsolved murders in the Black Sea republic." According to a confidential report compiled by former top U.S. law enforcement agency officials Borisov had used his position as the Chief Secretary of the Bulgarian Interior Ministry to help organized crime bosses attack their opponents.

On 14 January 2011, journalists from the Bulgarian weekly newspaper Galeria distributed audio records of an alleged conversation between Borisov and Customs Agency Head Vanyo Tanov. The tapes reveal that Borisov instructed customs authorities to immediately stop their investigation of "Ledenika" brewery which had been suspected of illegal activities and tax crimes. However, Finance Minister Simeon Djankov was recorded on tape ordering the Head of Customs to do his work properly and not yield to Borisov's demands.

This created a rift within the government, as it was widely believed that the wiretapping was ordered by Interior Minister Tsvetan Tsvetanov. Later those tapes were declared "manipulated" (not being able to tell if they were fake or not) by two independent examinations. In early July, Borisov admitted that the conversation had been genuine, though tampered with, while giving an interview to Bulgarian bloggers in the presence of the Interior Minister. A March 2013 investigation by the Prosecutor General suggests that the wire-tapping was ordered by Tsvetan Tsvetanov, Borisov's trusted deputy in the GERB party, with the aim of getting rid of Customs Head Vanyo Tanov.

Corruption has spread under his government, making Bulgaria the European Union's worst-ranked country by the NGO Transparency International. The Prime Minister and his entourage are said to have benefited in particular from a system of misappropriation of European structural funds allocated for the construction of highways. Political scientist Evgenii Dainov says: "[Boïko Borissov] has imposed the feudal structure of a gang of which he is the boss, with his lieutenants around him and local chiefs, some of whom have criminal records. Their goal: to make private profit from public funds." Despite the disclosure of compromising documents, such as audio recordings or photos taken by one of his mistresses showing numerous bundles of 500-euro bills in a drawer, the Bulgarian justice system has never launched an investigation into the matter.

=== Allegations of threatening journalists ===
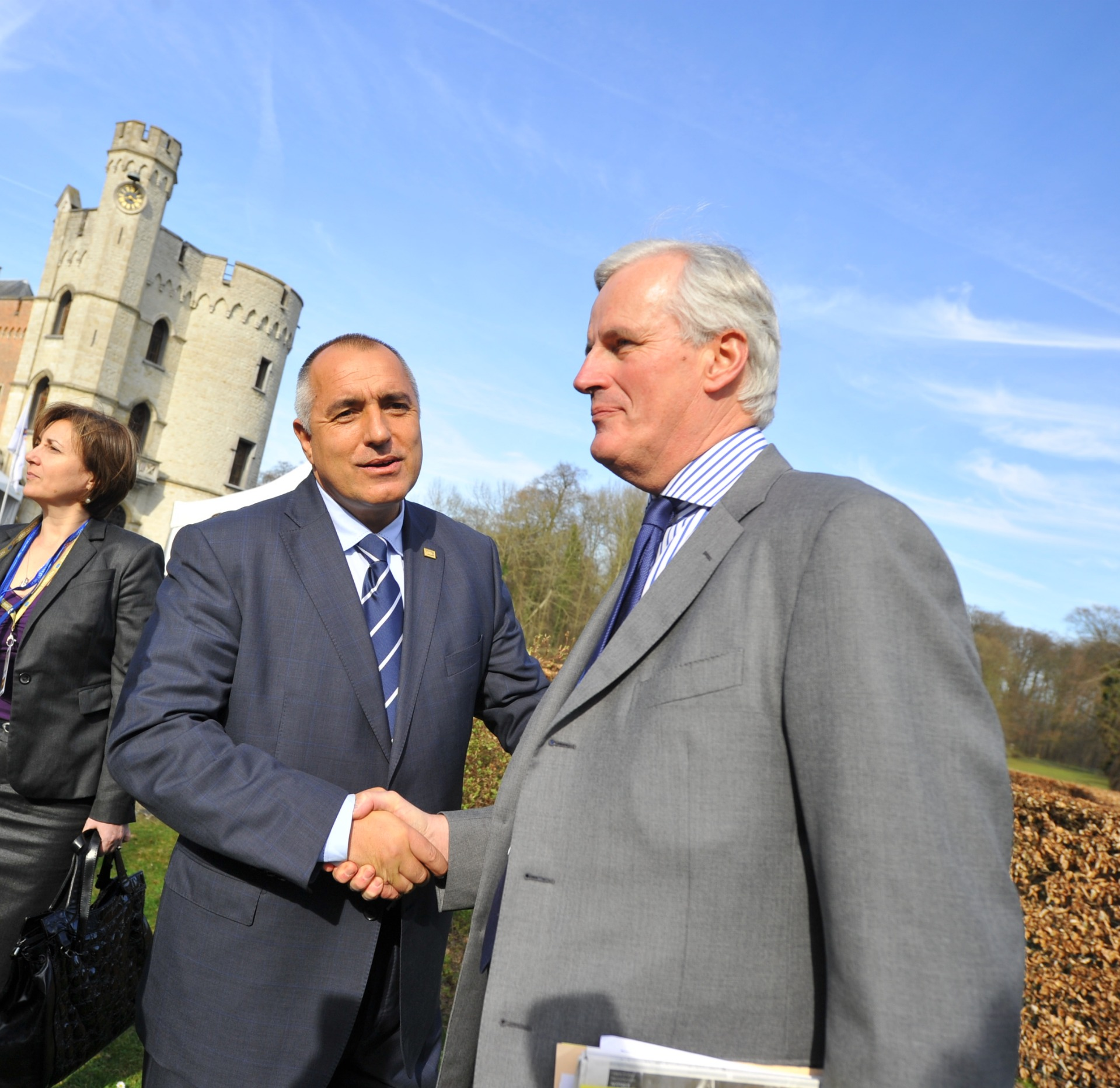
Michel Barnier and Boyko Borissov at the 2011 EPP summit at Bouchout Castle, Meise.

In early 2011, several think-tanks and analysts raised concerns about the decline of media freedom and transparency in Bulgaria. In 2011, reports surfaced that Borisov had paid cash to journalists to portray him favourably and threatened others who criticized him as early as 2005. In 2012, Bulgaria was ranked as the worst-performing EU member in terms of media freedom, according to Freedom House, and ranked 80th internationally. By 2018, Bulgaria had dropped to 111th globally in Reporters Without Borders' World Press Freedom Index, the lowest among all European Union members and candidate countries for the EU membership. According to Reporters Without Borders, EU funds have been diverted to sympathetic media outlets, while others have been bribed to be less critical of problematic topics. Attacks against individual journalists have also increased.

=== Allegations of racism and xenophobia ===
On 6 February 2009, Borisov, speaking in Chicago, told Bulgarian expatriates that the "human material" (as in, the German euphemism Menschenmaterial) and the basis of the Bulgarian population at that moment included 1 million Roma, 700,000 Turks, and 2.5 million pensioners. He added that the human material that they are left with as voters and as a pool for recruiting staff is really not that big, as half a million people have left Bulgaria. Vice-president of the Party of European Socialists, Jan Marinus Wiersma, accused Borisov of referring to the Turks, Roma, and pensioners in Bulgaria as "bad human material," and claimed that GERB "has already crossed the invisible line between right-wing populism and extremism."

Borisov denied these accusations and, in turn, accused the Bulgarian Socialist Party of attempting to discredit him. Borisov stated in a meeting with NGOs on 5 March 2009 that he intends to include representatives of the Roma ethnicity in all levels of government, including a potential minister, and has reached out to offer inclusivity to Bulgaria's ethnic Turkish population; although these measures and proposals have been seen as politically empty.

=== Image ===
Boyko Borisov's "man of the people" attitude and the failings of the previous government were seen as the main sources of his popularity in 2009. Borisov had also marked a widespread media presence, being regularly cited in most major media outlets, and had made a total of 1,157 statements from his election until the end of 2010. This trend continued throughout his first mandate, as Borisov and his party completely dominated the country's media reports, with his name being mentioned in more than 8,000 news articles in 2012. He has also been the subject of numerous sycophantic plaudits on the part of his supporters, including a poem lauding his "dignified leadership". In July 2012, he was included as a "historical personality" in history books for high school students, alongside former GERB minister Rosen Plevneliev and European commissioner Kristalina Georgieva. Borisov's popularity has been steadily declining due to ongoing scandals surrounding his most-trusted ministers – Tsvetan Tsvetanov and Agriculture Minister Miroslav Naydenov. Following a public row due to leaked wiretapped conversations between Boyko Borisov, Miroslav Naydenov, and the deputy prosecutor general, Boyko Borisov distanced himself from the former agriculture minister, and he was eventually excluded from GERB.

According to political scientist Ivan Krastev, "Boyko wants to be everybody's best friend. He wants to hear all sides, make them believe that he has taken their side. He thinks that he needs to take on all positions at once ... He is more pro-American, pro-Russian, and pro-European than anyone else."

In December 2011, Borisov, who occasionally plays as a striker for the third-division side FC Vitosha Bistritsa, collected 44% of about 8,000 votes in a fans' poll to crown Bulgaria's Footballer of the Year, ahead of then-Manchester United F.C. striker Dimitar Berbatov. Following the result, Borisov called for the award to be annulled, claiming it was a protest vote against the poor conditions of Bulgarian football.

=== Image controversy and popular protest ===
In June 2020, photographs emerged that purported to show what appeared to be Prime Minister Borisov lying half-naked on a bed, next to a nightstand featuring a handgun and stacks of euro banknotes. Borisov confirmed that the room in which the photos were taken was his, but denied the gun and money, stating that the images could have been manipulated. Borisov accused President Rumen Radev of flying a consumer drone into his residence to take the pictures. He also accused former Ombudswoman Maya Manolova, TV star Slavi Trifonov, and his own former second in command, Tsvetan Tsvetanov (who had just left and condemned the ruling party), of involvement in a plot to take photos of him while he was sleeping in a "KGB-Style" kompromat operation. Radev condemned the leaks and called it an "insane" invasion of the prime minister's privacy. He added that he owns a drone, but that the accusation that he personally piloted it into the prime minister's residence to take pictures was part of Borisov's "fantasy and paranoia". A leaked audio recording was also posted on the internet, in which a voice that strongly resembled Borisov's spoke in very brass tones and insulted a member of the National Assembly, as well as various European leaders. These scandals, along with an intrusion by the Prosecutor General into the Bulgarian presidency, triggered the 2020–2021 Bulgarian protests that sought the resignations of Borisov, his government, and the Prosecutor General.

In November 2021, a new batch of photos allegedly from Borisov's bedroom was released to the media.

== Notes ==
Party political offices
Position established	Leader of GERB; 2006–present	Incumbent
Political offices
Preceded by Stefan Sofiyanski	Mayor of Sofia; 2005–2009	Succeeded by Yordanka Fandakova
Preceded by Sergei Stanishev	Prime Minister of Bulgaria; 2009–2013	Succeeded by Marin Raykov
Preceded by Georgi Bliznashki	Prime Minister of Bulgaria; 2014–2017	Succeeded by Ognyan Gerdzhikov
Preceded by Ognyan Gerdzhikov	Prime Minister of Bulgaria; 2017–2021	Succeeded by Stefan Yanev
Diplomatic posts
Preceded by Jüri Ratas	Presidency of the Council of the European Union; 1 January 2018–1 July 2018	Succeeded by Sebastian Kurz
