= LoOney =

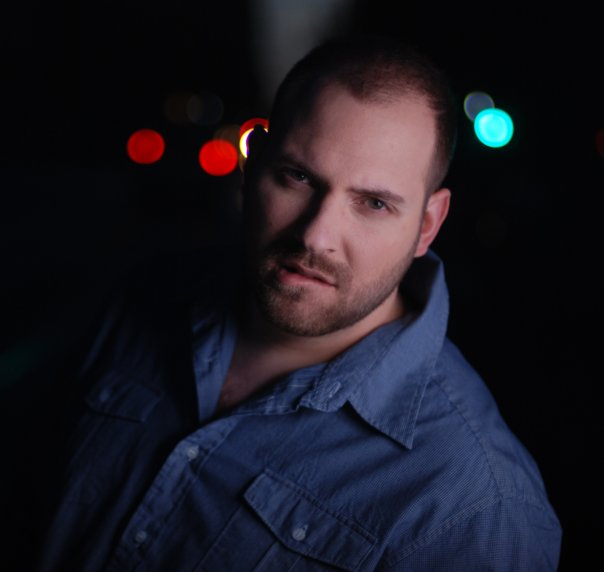
- Promo photo (2009)

Background information
- Birth name: Vladimir Marković
- Born: December 4, 1980 (age 44); Beograd, Serbia, Yugoslavia
- Genres: RnB, pop, dance
- Occupation(s): Singer, filmmaker
- Instrument: Vocals
- Years active: 2004–present
- Labels: Bassivity Digital (2023–present), Looneyrama (2008–2023)

Vladimir Marković alias LoOney (born December 4, 1980) is a Serbian singer-songwriter, actor, filmmaker and comic artist. He rose to prominence as a child actor and is known for playing Zlatko in TV series "Metla Bez Drške", one of the most popular Serbian children's television series.

In the beginnings of 2000's he adopted LoOney as his artistic alias and started creating underground comics with Šlic Comix group, and had several exhibitions and a lot of publications with them.

LoOney was the first Serbian RnB singer, and had great success with solo single "Jutro (Pametnije Od Noći)" which led to hit singles "Tajne" (from Struka's album "Ipak Se Obrće"), "Geto Riba" and "Sekund, Minut, Sat" (both on Lud's album "U Ime Igre"). He has one album, "Kompromis", which was initially published through MTV Adria and later added on Bassivity Digital label, with all his other solo work.

After finishing Faculty of Dramatic Arts, University of Arts in Belgrade, he has successful career working for film, TV and web.

== Career ==
He began his career as Zlatko, the main character of "Metla Bez Drške", a Serbian children's television series. He also sang in the children's choir Kolibri, and appeared with the group in several TV shows, including "Deco Pevajte Sa Nama", "Ispeci Pa Reci", "Sedefna Ruža" and others.

As a teenager, he discontinued acting and singing and became an underground comic artist with dozens of other artists' and self-published fanzines. Marković started using his alias "LoOney: in 1999 as art-name. In 2002, with a group of friends, he created and managed "Šlic Comix", an alternative comics magazine and weekly workshop. Some comics were re-published internationally, and exhibitions traveled around Serbia, Croatia, Bosnia, Macedonia, Slovenia, Romania, Italy, and Sweden. Marković later stopped drawing, but wrote for other artists. In 2002, he started directing and editing hip-hop music videos. Six years later, he became a filmmaker in Serbia. Marković directed TV shows "Hoću Da Znaš", "Siti i Vitki","X-Factor Adria" and edited TV shows "Zvezda Pre Svega", "Exit Kultomotivator", "Exit U Pokretu" and "Ja imam talenat!".

In 2004, Marković self-published his first solo single "Jutro (Pametnije Od Noći)" with accompanying music video which got No. 2 place on, at that point, only domestic music video chart in Serbia on TV Metropolis. Marković was featured on other artists' albums and singles, including Struka's "Tajne", Lud's "Geto Riba" with accompanying music video featuring stars of a movie "Mi Nismo Anđeli 2."

In 2010, Marković released a mixtape "Featuring! Vol. 1". Soon after that, Marković published a single "Mucam" with two remixes created by Serbian DJs, SevdahBaby and Flip. SevdahBaby, amongst other celebrities, appears in "Mucam" music video, again directed by LoOney himself. Debut album "Kompromis", rare Serbian urban and RnB effort, finally saw the light of day in 2011 in digital form through MTV Adria Network websites. In that way, album became accessible to the whole Adriatic region. His latest single "(Hoću S Tobom Da) Đuskam / (I Wanna) Dance With You" was released in September 2013.

== Discography ==
=== Solo albums ===
- 2011: Kompromis

=== Solo mixtapes ===
- 2010: Featuring! Vol. 1

=== Solo singles ===
- 2004: "Jutro (Pametnije Od Noći)"
- 2010: "Mucam"
- 2013: "(Hoću S Tobom Da) Đuskam + (I Wanna) Dance With You"

=== Albums as a featured artist ===
- 1990: Kolibri – Koncert
- 1998: Kolibri – Kolibri
- 2004: Struka – Ipak Se Obrće
- 2005: Suid – Drama Koja Se Šunja Sama
- 2005: Various Artists – Definicija
- 2005: Various Artists – Hip-Hop Hits Vol. 1
- 2005: Various Artists – Mi Nismo Anđeli 2 (Muzika Iz Filma)
- 2005: Grupna Terapija – Ko te Šalje?
- 2006: Lud – U Ime igre
- 2006: Sett – Dnevnik Dvorske Lude
- 2006: Gospoda – Realno Gledano
- 2007: Shwartzenigga – Beograd Vietnam
- 2008: Grupna Terapija – Ko Te Šalje?
- 2008: Sin – Kosovo Vijetnam
- 2008: Big Sha – Bread and Amphetamines
- 2009: Dada – Radio Ubica Dečjeg Lica
- 2009: Sett – Vodič Kroz Život Za Bezbrižne
- 2009: Cvija – I Dalje Tu
- 2010: Mija – Van Kontrole
- 2011: B-Crew – Naša Posla
- 2015: Fil Tilen – Predstava Počinje

=== Singles as a featured artist ===
- 2004: Struka ft. LoOney – "Tajne"
- 2005: Lud ft. LoOney – "Geto Riba"
- 2006: Lud ft. VIP, Struka, Borko THC & LoOney – "Sekund, Minut, Sat"
- 2011: Kantare ft. Tatula & LoOney – "Kad Bi Bila Sa Mnom"
- 2011: Papi Jaaz & Da Daz ft. LoOney – "Ona Zna"
- 2016: Kendi ft. LoOney – "Nostalgija"
- 2020: Sashka Yanx ft. LoOney - "Hajde da se plešemo"

=== Singles as a songwriter ===
- 2011: Trik FX – "Kokoška" (with Marko Kon & Drilla)
- 2013: Kristina Grujin – "Idemo U Disko" (with Ognjen Amidžić, Marko Kon & Drilla)
- 2013: Sindy – "Telo Gori" (with Marko Kon & Drilla)
- 2013: Željko & Lubee Game – "Encore" (with Marko Kon, Lubee Game & Drilla)
- 2019: Klikbejt – "Klikbejt" (with Papi Jaaz & Grzi)
- 2019: Klikbejt – "Drama" (with Papi Jaaz & Grzi)

== Videography ==
=== As a director ===
- 2004: "Kuća Na Promaji" for Marčelo
- 2004: "Jutro (Pametnije Od Noći)" for LoOney (himself)
- 2006: "Sekund, Minut, Sat" for Lud, VIP, Struka, Borko THC & LoOney (himself)
- 2009: "Živi Bili Pa Videli" for Željko Samardžić
- 2009: "Moja Želja Si Ti" for Cvija
- 2009: "Balkan" for Priki
- 2009: "Požuri" for Ksenija Pajčin & MC Stojan
- 2009: "Tajni Susreti" for Noć i Dan
- 2010: "Supica" for Ksenija Pajčin & Danijel Alibabić
- 2010: "Đinđirinđi 100%" for Blek Panters
- 2010: "Sexy" for Tina Ivanović & MC Stojan
- 2010: "Ljubav (Live at Kalemegdan)" for LoOney (himself)
- 2010: "Ovako Je U Švici" for Komplex & Eky
- 2010: "Diskoteka" for Cvija & DJ Shone
- 2010: "Mucam" for LoOney (himself)
- 2010: "DJ Pumpaj" for MC Stojan & Anabela
- 2011: "Nikom Nije Lako" for Saška Janković (Miss Jukebox)
- 2012: "Klik, Blic, Smešak" for Dada & Marvel
- 2012: "You & Me" for DJ Macro / Syntheticsax / Kantare
- 2012: "Zaustavite Januar" for Željko Samardžić
- 2013: "Jadna Ja" Zlatopis & Macka B
- 2013: "Encore" for Željko & Lubee Game
- 2013: "Ajde Vodi Me" for Rastko Aksentijević & MC Sajsi
- 2014: "Pakao i Raj" for DJ Mlađa & Sha
- 2014: "Open Your Heart" for Yoya Wolf
- 2014: "Kišno Leto" for Stevan Anđelković & Tanja Savić
- 2015: "Sudar" for Euterpa
- 2015: "Žena" for Marina Visković
- 2015: "Letnje Avanture" for Snežana Nena Nešić
- 2016: "Moje Vreme Je Sad" for Dada & Plema
- 2018: "Kraljevi Falša" for Mr. Sharan
- 2019: "Klikbejt" for Klikbejt
- 2019: "Drama" for Klikbejt
- 2019: "Samo Da Mi Je" for Lena Kovačević
- 2020: "Kao Da Sam Luda" for Milena Munja Stojanović
- 2023: "Negde duboko tu" for Kiki Lesendrić & Piloti
