= LiLana =

Bulgarian singer

- Born: Lilana Hristova Deyanova; 28 April 1985 (age 41); Sofia, Bulgaria
- Genres: R&B, pop
- Occupation: Singer
- Instrument: piano
- Years active: 2003–2009

LiLana (born 1985) is a Bulgarian singer and ex-TV host. She is best known for her appearance in the celebrity spin-off of the reality show Big Brother – VIP Brother.

In 2009 LiLana came into public eye with a song named "Dime Piece" featuring Big Sha & Snoop Dogg. The idea for the song came when she met Big Sha in the live studio of Big Brother 4 Bulgaria at the end of 2008.
