= MTV Adria =

European music television channel

- Final logo used from 1 July 2011 to 31 December 2017
- Broadcast area: Albania; Bosnia and Herzegovina; Croatia; Kosovo; Macedonia; Montenegro; Serbia; Slovenia

Ownership
- Owner: Viacom International Media Networks Europe

History
- Launched: 1 September 2005; 21 years ago
- Replaced: MTV Europe
- Closed: 31 December 2017; 8 years ago
- Replaced by: MTV Europe

MTV Adria was a localized version of the American channel MTV, customized for Adrian countries, replacing the Pan-European version of MTV. It served the countries of Albania, Bosnia and Herzegovina, Croatia, Kosovo, Macedonia, Montenegro, Serbia and Slovenia.

== History of MTV Adria ==
- The channel launched on 1 September 2005, replacing MTV Europe across the region and beaming its free-to-air signal through Spacecom's AMOS satellites at orbital position 4° West, The first music video was Beautiful Day by U2.
- MTV Adria's main headquarters were initially located in Ljubljana, Slovenia. In June 2009, however, MTV began to strengthen its presence within the region by expanding its offices to Zagreb and Belgrade, the latter Belgrade become the station's main headquarter, co-ordinating with MTV Networks Europe in London, Warsaw and Budapest.
- Operations began to be regionalised and diversified especially in Albania, Croatia, Serbia and Slovenia, leading to the launch of 4 separate feeds, unofficially known as MTV Albania, MTV Croatia, MTV Slovenia and MTV Serbia, which enabled to share the same content, online branding and on-air programming, though with localised subtitles, advertising and sponsorship, making each of them relevant to one of three key markets within the region. The Serbian feed was also available in Bosnia and Herzegovina, Kosovo, Macedonia and Montenegro. On air, the network has only been referred to as MTV since the relaunch in 2009. Over the 4 months prior to the channel's re-launch, the caption "Adria" was silently removed from logos and programmes (i.e. with "Adria Top 20" being renamed to just "Top 20").
- On 3 August 2009 MTV encrypted its main satellite feed, which had been free-to-air since its launch, becoming therefore available only to pay-TV subscribers and cable customers in the region.
- On 16 September 2009 MTV launched 3 new regional websites, available in Croatian, Slovene and Serbian language, each on its own country's TLD and with almost no mentions of the word Adria. They were known as MTV Hrvatska, MTV Slovenija and MTV Srbija. However, the MTV Adria domain is still active, though now only redirecting to the localized Facebook pages and using the word "Adria" as an umbrella term that encompasses all of them.
- The 3 feeds continued to share the same on-air programming until the first half of 2011. On 25 August 2011 MTV further split its 3 feeds, not only during commercial breaks, but also programming-wise. For the first time since the channel's launch, different programming can be broadcast across the region. However, the output of the 3 local feeds remained almost identical.
- As of 1 March 2015, MTV Slovenia and MTV Croatia shared a single feed, with a mix of Croatian and Slovene commercials and English promos. Furthermore, MTV Slovenia's website has been shut down, offering visitors redirects to either Croatian or UK MTV website, later in year redirection was changed to Serbian website.
- As of 18 March 2015, the channel switched to both broadcasting in 16:9 format (with older 4:3 videos being stretched to 16:9, unlike all the other MTV channels in Europe, where 4:3 videos are zoomed to 14:9) and displaying all on-air text in English - the only exceptions being each country's own subtitles and Serbo-Croatian word for ads being shown on idents signaling the beginning/end of commercials.
- On 3 July 2017 MTV Adria replaced reality and scripted programming with music content returning the channel to a 24-hour music channel with a single feed. The localized websites were shut down and redirected to localized Facebook pages.
- On 18 September 2017, starting at 6am, the channel stopped showing most of its usual on-screen graphics (only showing the channel's logo and currently playing music video at the beginning and end of one) along with dropping all themed blocks and charts.
- On 1 January 2018, exactly at midnight, MTV Adria stopped broadcasting and was replaced by MTV Europe. The final song to be played on the channel was Beautiful Day by U2 before fading to black.

== Branding ==
- From September 2005 to October 2006, MTV Adria, as it was known at the time, adopted the same graphic set which was then used by other local MTV channels in Europe, including MTV Germany and MTV Europe and featured urban elements.
- From October 2006 to May 2007, it switched to a new graphic set which was specifically created for MTV Adria and included abstract elements such as colored spots scattered around the screen during promos and video IDs.
- From May 2007 to June 2009 the channel used a graphic set known as "Electrofolk", which was especially developed by MTV Networks International for MTV Adria and other MTV channels from the Emerging Markets area.
- In June 2009, MTV Adria was the first channel to introduce the latest graphic set commissioned by MTV's World Design Studio. Most other MTV channels across Europe and the world adopted the same graphic set on 1 July 2009. The station also received a rebrand at the same time, with a new bug and song-title graphics set, which was subsequently adopted by all international versions of MTV (except for MTV US) from 1 July 2009.
- On 1 July 2011 MTV rebranded again, rolling out a new logo on-air (previously used on MTV US since 2010), along with new idents and graphics. This set is a blend between the previous branding by Universal Everything and the current branding of MTV US by Popkern.

== Programming ==
Ever since its launch, MTV Adria has carried a much higher amount of music programming in its schedule compared to most of its sister channels across Europe, preserving MTV Europe's original format. The channel's schedule also includes some locally produced content and a number of non-music productions sourced from MTV US, MTV Networks Europe and MTV Networks International.

=== Music programming ===
A wide spectrum of musical genres was covered through various specialist music shows and videographies airing on a daily or weekly basis. Music video-based shows airing regularly on the channel included:

- 3 From 1
- Alternative Nation
- Biggest! Hottest! Loudest!
- Chill Out Zone
- Dancefloor Chart
- Domača Naloga / Domaća Zadaća / Domaći Zadatak
- Domačica / Domaćica
- Hip Hop Chart
- Jukebox
- Morning Mix
- MTV Live
- MTV Premiera / MTV Premijera
- Music Non Stop
- Party Zone
- Pop Up Video
- Rock Chart
- The 10 Biggest Tracks Right Now
- Top 10 At 10
- Top 20

=== International music initiatives & programming ===
- MTV Push
- MTV World Stage

=== Local productions ===
Most local productions were music-focused.

- Hitorama
- Okus Znanih / Ukus Poznatih
- MTV Band 2012
- MTV Express
- MTV Takeover
- Summer Festival Report
- MTV Reporteri (broadcast on the Serbian feed only)

=== Entertainment / International programming ===
The channel carried the following international acquisitions in its schedule:

- Awkward
- Catfish: The TV Show
- House Of Food
- Geordie Shore
- Girl Code
- Guy Code
- Plain Jane
- Ridiculousness
- Snack-Off
- Snooki & Jwoww
- Teen Mom 2
- The Challenge
- The Ex And The Why?
- The Real World
- Times Up
- Warsaw Shore
- Ex On The Beach

== VJs & Hosts ==
Throughout its first years on air, MTV Adria produced many VJ-led music shows, which were eventually discontinued in 2008, as the VJ concept began to be gradually phased out of MTV Networks International's global strategy. At present, occasional hosted shows are still being produced locally, although regular VJ-based shows are no longer scheduled on the channel. Local VJs and hosts who have appeared on MTV Adria over the years include:

- Ana Šutinoska (The Rock Chart)
- Galeb Nikačević Hasci-Jare (Blok Chart, MTV Reporteri)
- Ida Prester (Hitorama)
- Ivan Šarić (MTV News Weekend Edition, Vibra)
- Lana Borić (Dancefloor Chart)
- Maja Taraniš a.k.a. Gigia (Adria Top 20, MTV News, Vibra)
- Martina Vrbos (Blok, Blok Chart, Pure Adria Chart)
- Maša Pavoković (Adria Top 20)
- Mia Kovačić (Vibra)
- Naida Kundurović (MTV News, Impulse)
- Polona Odlazek (Adria Top 20)
- Sergej Trifunović (Hitorama)

== Availability ==
MTV was distributed through local cable providers in the region, as well as DTH satellite platforms such as Max TV and TotalTV.

== MTV Europe Music Awards: Best Adria Act ==
Local performers who appeared on MTV were eligible to receive the Best Adria Act award at the annual MTV Europe Music Awards. The winners were:

- Siddharta (2005)
- Aleksandra Kovač (2006)
- Van Gogh (2007) & (2014)
- Elvir Laković Laka (2008)
- Lollobrigida (2009)
- Gramophonedzie (2010)
- Dubioza Kolektiv (2011)
- Who See (2012)
- Frenkie (2013)
- Daniel Kajmakoski (2015)
- S.A.R.S (2016)
- Ničim Izazvan (2017)

== MTV Download ==
On 1 January 2011, MTV Adria introduced the MTV Download section on all three MTV web sites in Serbia, Croatia and Slovenia. With idea of helping striving music business in the region this free download platform helped regional musicians to publish their music and get needed promotion. The first official MTV release was album of Serbian band S.A.R.S. which had 45000 downloads in three months. MTV published over 60 albums and singles through this feature.

List of album releases available on MTV Adria websites as free download:

- S.A.R.S. – " Perspektiva"
- MVP – "Za bolje znam, al' mi bolje ne treba"
- Bei The Fish – "Ideal Woman"
- MistakeMistake "MMORPG"
- MaraQya - "Savršen dan"
- Bei the Fish - "Just an Idea!?" atto primo…
- LoOney - "Kompromis"
- General Woo - "Verbalni delikt"
- Tea Break - "Second Hand Hero"
- Trash Candy - "What's Your Story?"
- Toni Zen - "Toni Zen e.....SuperZen"
- Mirko Luković - "Gola voda"
- Nikola Sarić Sajko - "Pesmom kroz zid"
- High Control - "Report"
- Krš - "Prekršaj"
- Azil 5 - "Heart fiesta"
- Polyester Shock - "Odmah i sad"
- Emkej - "Znajdi se"
- SevdahBABY - "(Extrava)ganc novi FUNK!"
- Sell Out (band) - "The Best Of"
- TheSpian - "Why So Serious"
- Samostalni referenti – "The GreaTESTIS Hits"
- Igor Garnier - "Love Is Taking Control"
- Viseći vrtovi Vavilona - "Indigo deca"
- Who See - "Krš i Drača"
- Artiljero - "Artiljero OST"
