= Nikolina Angelkova =

Bulgarian politician

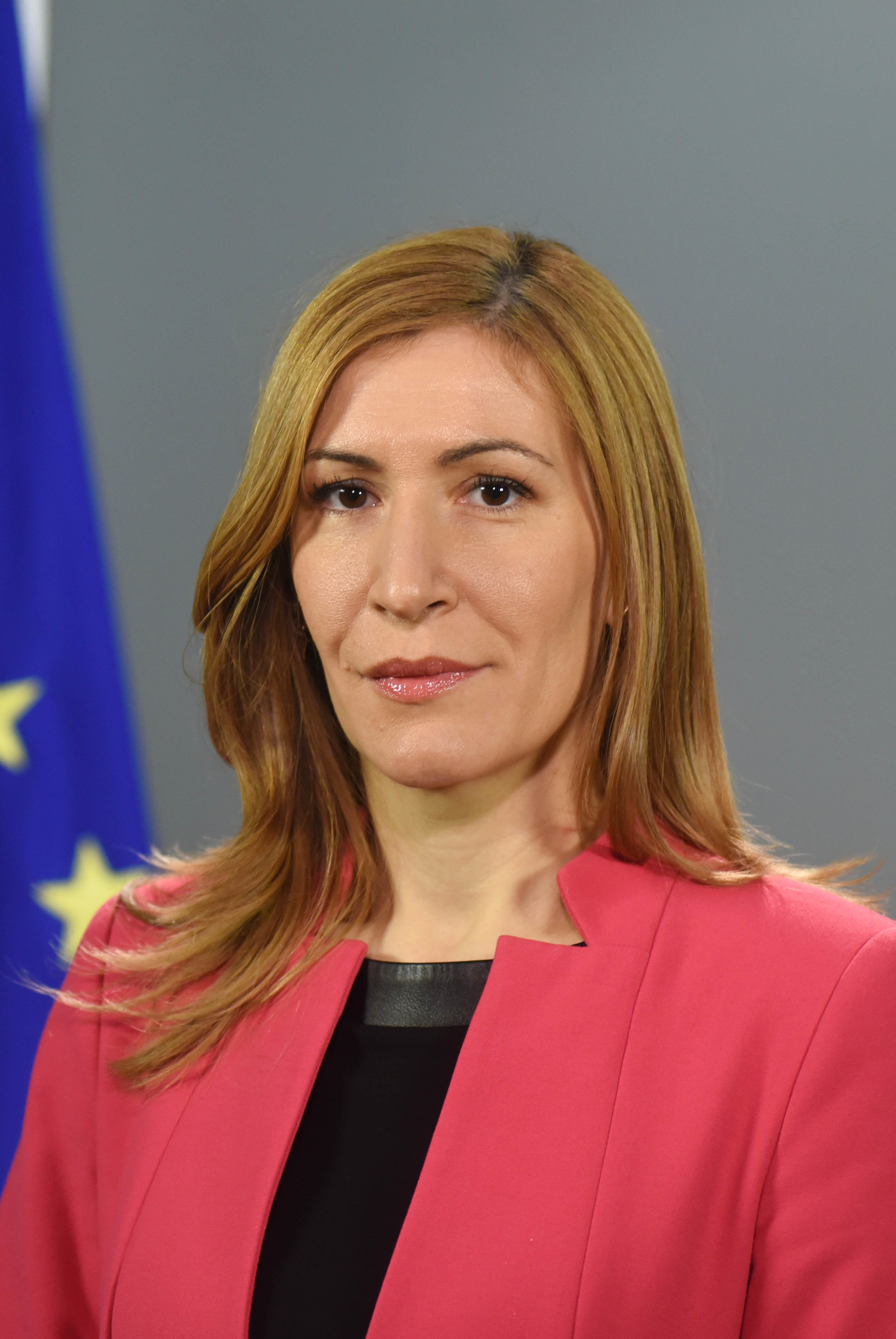
Nikolina Angelkova

Nikolina Angelkova (Bulgarian: Николина Ангелкова) (born 30 November 1979) is a Bulgarian politician who was the Minister of Tourism from 4 May 2017 to 23 July 2020, and has also served as the Minister of Tourism from November 2014 to January 2017. She serves as a member of the parliament for the GERB.

== Biography ==
She received an MA in Law from the University of National and World Economy in Sofia.

Between 2002 and 2006, she served as the head of the Association for Legal Development and Counsel to the Parliamentary Committee on Regional Policy and Public Works. She trained at the Directorate-General for the Environment, a part of the European Commission, between 2005 and 2007. There, she advised the head of the Bulgarian delegation to the European People's Party on matters related to transportation, environment and regional development.

She served at the Ministry of Regional Development and Public Works from 2010 to 2011 as the leader of the Control, Communication and Coordination Unit. She became Deputy Minister of Regional Development and Public Works in 2011 and occupied this post until 2013, being responsible for the European and international affairs of the ministry.

She has also pursued a career outside civil service. Between 2005 and 2010, she owned the consultancy firm Nikolova and Partners.
