= Dime Piece =

Single by LiLana featuring Snoop Dogg and Big Sha
- Released: April 24, 2009; September 20, 2009
- Recorded: 2009
- Genre: Rap, Pop, R&B
- Length: 3:29
- Label: Virginia, Universal
- Songwriter(s): Jerome Anthony Matthews, Reginald Marcellous Rucker
- Producer(s): Ariel Rodriguez

LiLana singles chronology
"Sound of Goodbye" (2008)	"Dime Piece" (2009)	"Out My Video" (2010)

Snoop Dogg singles chronology
"Hot Girl" (2009)	"Dime Piece" (2009)	"Gangsta Luv" (2009)

Big Sha singles chronology
"I Like" (2008)	"Dime Piece" (2009)

"Dime Piece" is a song released as a single by Bulgarian singer LiLana. The song features American hip hop veteran Snoop Dogg and fellow Bulgarian rapper Big Sha. The track is produced by Ariel Rodriguez and was released as a single on April 24, 2009 in Bulgaria, along with a music video. The digital premiere of the song in the United States was made in June 2009 and the single's premiere worldwide (not including Bulgaria) was published on September 20, 2009.

The remix version of the song was released on September 29, 2009.

== Music video ==
The music video premiered together with the single on April 24, 2009 in various Bulgarian music channels. It was shot in Los Angeles and it was directed by Morocco Vaughn. The video includes cameo appearances by Don "Magic" Juan and Coldhard from Chicago rap group Crucial Conflict.

The remix video premiered on September 29, 2009.
