= Spens (musician) =

- Also known as: Spens
- Born: Stanislav Naydenov; 13 October 1975 (age 50)
- Origin: Pleven, Bulgaria
- Label: CCCP

Spens (born Stanislav Naydenov), is a Bulgarian hip hop artist. He was born in Pleven on October 13, 1975.

As a high school student he recorded amateur songs using nothing but a synthesizer and tape deck. After graduation in 1994, he moved to the of Sofia to pursue studies in computer information technologies. He also actively pursued his interest in music and managed to meet a number of like-minded people.

Together with DJ Stancho, Slim and O.C.G. he formed Sniper Records, the first Bulgarian label specialised in rap and hip hop music. Soon several projects were created such as the movie "Hip-Hop Gorilla", its soundtrack in three parts and numerous hip-hop events in Bulgaria.

== Albums ==
With the release of his first solo album in 2000 entitled Prekaleno Lichno I (Too Personal, Part I), Spens managed to establish himself as one of the biggest names on the Bulgarian hip-hop scene overnight. Two of the biggest hits on that album were "Napravi Me" (Make Me) and the street anthem "Pisna Mi" (I'm Sick of It). Various collaborations with other Bulgarian MCs who were then unknown were found on the Very Personal Part I album such as Slim, Vyara, OCG, etc. The album was released at a time when the hip-hop scene in Bulgaria was expanding its footprint, along with gaining tremendous interest and support from the sheer number of people who began to acknowledge and embrace it. This was key, as it had an undeniably positive effect on Spens' and other hip hop artists' career. This series of events is also known among the Bulgarian hip-hop fans as The Second Wave (2000–2006).

Spens released his second album entitled Prekaleno Lichno II (Very Personal part II) in 2003. Throughout the tracks, he adhered to his patented sound and lyrics, while meeting and exceeding the expectations set by fans and local media. In the album he was able to address a plethora of issues, ranging from the basics in day-to-day existence to political events and personas, nationals interests, and complex emotional relationships - a bit changed style in comparison with the first album. After that, Spens made several tracks featuring known and unknown artists, the most prominent being with Macedonian rappers Skopje Via Sofia and Puka Kosmetika, and the Austrian hip-hop artists Herbe Mischung. In 2007 he appeared on the album of Polish MC Sokol "Teraz Pieniadz W Cenie" on the most known Slavic joint ever "Nie lekceważ nas" ("Don't underestimate us") featuring rappers from every Slavic country. After the end of The Second Wave, Spens became inactive as an MC and focused on his work in the media (radio nJoy and Bulgarian Television (bTV)).

Spens has had the opportunity to work with many other talented artists, including the neo-metal band Skre4, Bulgarian pop icon Grafa, and R&B singer Santra. He is also currently the host of the Bulgarian Top 100 countdown.

== See also ==
- More Bulgarian Rap artists.
