= Miroslav Naydenov =

Bulgarian politician

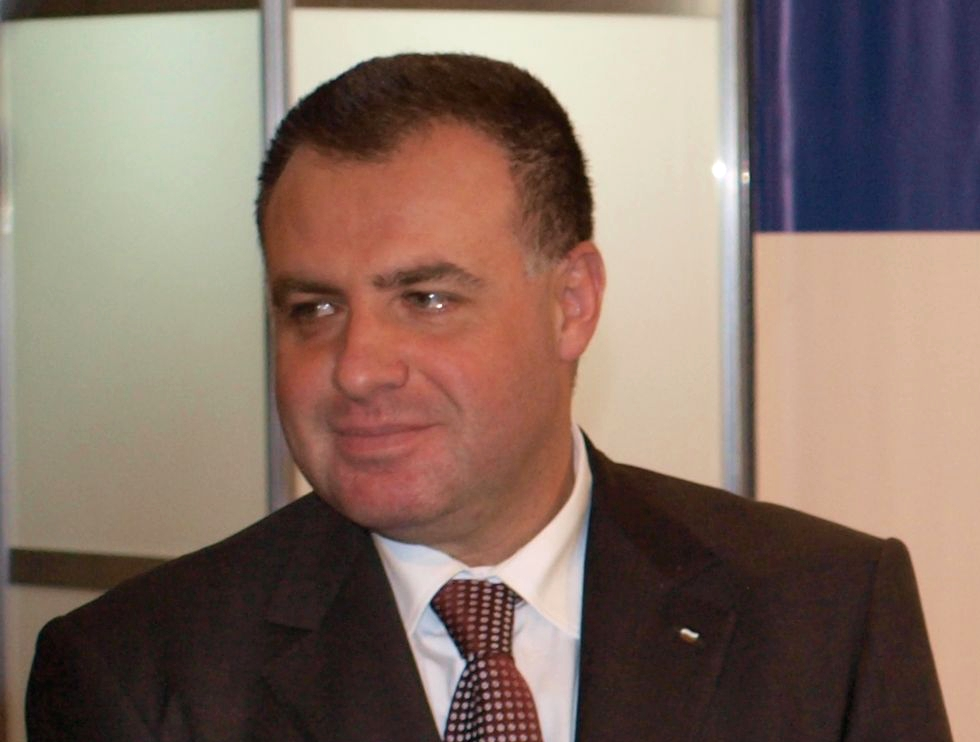

Minister of Agriculture and Food
- In office 27 July 2009 – 13 March 2013
- Prime Minister: Boyko Borisov
- Preceded by: Valeri Tsvetanov
- Succeeded by: Ivan Stankov

Personal details
- Born: 14 December 1968 (age 57) Vratsa, Bulgaria
- Party: Basta (2009 – 2013)
- Occupation: Veterinarian, Politician

Miroslav Hristoforov Naydenov, also sometimes spelled as Naidenov (Bulgarian: Мирослав Христофоров Найденов [ˈnajdɛnof]) was a Bulgarian politician of the GERB party and former Minister of Agriculture and Forestry (2009–2013) in the eighty-seventh government of Bulgaria of Prime Minister Boyko Borisov. After leaving GERB, Naydenov's name was mentioned a couple of times in the news in the context of smaller political projects.

== Biography ==
Naydenov was born on 14 December 1968 in Vratsa, Bulgaria. He graduated in veterinary medicine from the Higher Institute of Zootechnics and Veterinary Medicine, now Trakia University in Stara Zagora. After finishing his education, he worked as an apprentice veterinarian and later as a veterinarian with his own clinic in the town of Vratsa. In the period 2002–04, he was director of the Regional Veterinary Service in Vratsa. In the period 2005–06 he was the Secretary-General of the National Veterinary Service in Sofia. From 2006 to 2009 he was director of the municipal company "Ekoravnovesie" of Sofia Municipality.

In the elections of 5 July 2009 he was elected as member of parliament for GERB on the proportional list of the Vratsa constituency. He was proposed to be the Minister of Agriculture and Food after the refusal of Desislava Taneva to take this post.

On December 6, 2011, Naydenov donated fish to children from the St. Nikolas orphanage, which belongs to Father Ivan in the Novi Han village.

== Family ==
Naydenov is married with two children.
